= Ryuto Kazuhara =

Japanese singer and dancer

- 数原 龍友
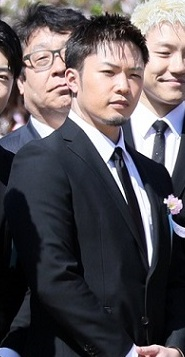
- Born: December 28, 1992 (age 33); Amagasaki, Hyogo, Japan
- Education: Amagasaki Hamada Elementary School, Amagasaki Ōshōkita Junior High School
- Occupation: Singer
- Years active: 2011–present
- Height: 170 cm (5 ft 7 in)
- Musical career
- Genres: J-pop, dance
- Instruments: Vocals, piano, drums
- Labels: LDH, Rhythm Zone
- Website: www.ldh.co.jp/eng/management/kazuhara//

Ryuto Kazuhara (数原 龍友, Kazuhara Ryuto; born December 28, 1992) is a Japanese singer and dancer. He is a vocalist of the Japanese all-male dance and music group Generations from Exile Tribe. Ryuto is represented with LDH.

== Biography ==
To achieve his dream of becoming a singer, Ryuto dropped out of high school and attended Osaka's EXPG while doing part-time jobs.

In February 2010, he participated in VOCAL BATTLE AUDITION 2 ~Yume wo Motta Wakamono-tachi e~ arranged by Exile to become a member of Sandaime J Soul Brothers but lost in the final round (alongside groupmate Ryota Katayose).

On July 19, 2011, Ryuto was selected as a candidate for GENERATIONS, and on April 17, 2012, he was announced as an official member. Generations from Exile Tribe made their major debut on November 21, 2012, with the single "Brave It Out".

In 2013, he participated in Fuji TV's Kendama competition "Geinoukai Tokugiou Ketteisen Teppen" and managed to win the first place.

In 2016, Ryuto made his debut as a voice actor for the Japanese dubbing of the American superhero TV show Legends of Tomorrow. He would be in charge of voicing Grant Wilson / Second Generation Death Stroke.

In November 2018, he was chosen as one of the ambassadors for LDH Martial Arts' "ENERGY PROJECT" which advertises different fitness supplies from LDH's original brand alongside fellow Generations member Alan Shirahama and E-girls members Karen Fujii and Anna Suda.

On September 21, 2019, he collaborated with fashion brand 24karats for the second time to release a collection of sportswear titled NO PAIN NO GAIN. On October 3 in the same year, Ryuto made his solo debut with the digital single "Nostalgie", which was used in the movie HiGH&LOW: THE WORST. On the same day, he opened a personal Instagram account, being the last member of Generations to do so.

On March 4, 2020, he will release his second solo song "Mou ichido kimi to odoritai" (もう一度君と踊りたい; I want to dance with you again) which will be used in the play of the same name from LDH's BOOK ACT.

== Discography ==
=== Digital singles ===
Year	Title	Release date	Ref.
2019	Nostalgie	October 3	
2020	Mou ichido kimi to odoritai (もう一度君と踊りたい)	March 4	

=== Lyrics ===
Year	Title	Artist	Album
2015	I Remember	Generations from Exile Tribe	Generation Ex
2016	...For You	Generations from Exile Tribe	Speedster
2017	NEXT	Generations from Exile Tribe	Namida wo Nagasenai Pierrot wa Taiyou mo Tsuki mo nai Sora wo Miageta
2019	Shinsei	Generations from Exile Tribe	Shonen Chronicle

== Filmography ==
=== Live ===
Year	Title	Notes
2014	Vocal Battle Audition Presents: Vocal Battle Stage 2014	

=== TV series ===
Year	Title	Network
2013	Geinoukai Tokugiou Ketteisen TEPPEN 2013	Fuji TV
2014	Geinoukai Tokugiou Ketteisen TEPPEN 2014 SUMMER	Fuji TV

=== Film ===
Year	Title	Role	Notes	Ref.
2023	Sana	Himself	Lead role	

=== Radio ===
Year	Title	Notes
2016–2018	TOKYO VAGABOND	As a Thursday navigator

=== Advertisements ===
Year	Title	Notes
2015	Moist Diane "Extra Shine"	

=== Voice dubbing ===
- Legend of Tomorrow (2016) – Grant Wilson / Second Generation Death Stroke (Jamie Andrew Cutler)
