= Sekai (dancer) =

Sekai Yamamoto
- 山本 世界
- Born: February 21, 1991 (age 35); Hayama, Kanagawa, Japan
- Occupation: Dancer
- Years active: 2014–present
- Height: 175 cm (5 ft 9 in)
- Musical career
- Genres: J-pop, dance
- Labels: LDH, Rhythm Zone
- Website: Official Profile

Sekai Yamamoto (山本 世界, Yamamoto Sekai, born February 21, 1991, in Hayama, Kanagawa), better known by his stage name Exile Sekai (Exile 世界), is a Japanese dancer. He is a member of Exile and also the leader of the J-pop dance and vocal group Fantastics from Exile Tribe, and he forms dance unit XXIV Clan (later changes to FTHEB) with friends in 2014. As a member of Fantastics from Exile Tribe, he wins the "Best 5 New Artists Award" at the Japan Gold Disc Award in 2019. In 2020, he played "Gentleman Thief" in immersive theatre Sakura Hime in Minami-za. Since April 2020, he has become a regular host at Iwate Asahi Television's information program "It's good! I want to see! I want to know! I want to go out!". He loves anime, manga, and game, and deems himself as an otaku.

Sekai is represented by LDH.

== Biography ==
=== Early life ===
Sekai was born on February 21, 1991, in Hayama, Kanagawa. His mother was an actress of Takarazuka Revue and ran a dance class after she quit. Growing up in a house surrounded full of dance, Sekai started dancing at the age of 2 under the influence of his mother and the environment of growing up in a dance studio run by his mother. He learnt ballet and jazz dance for around ten years, while he was also learning Hip-Hop dance from O.G.S's Tatsu alongside Exile Tetsuya and House dance from Pyro's TooRu as an elementary school students. He decided he would not be a professional ballet dancer at grade five as he found he was not so fond of the tights that ballet dancer would wear, and he was often criticized by his teacher for his head tended to follow the rhythm of the music when dancing ballet, and chose to become a street dancer instead. He fell in love with performing on stage with his experience of dancing in the center in dancing performance, as he was often the solo child dancer in the group. As a result, he decided to take the audition of Shiki Theatre Company after watching the Lion King, and he passed it to become their young Simba in the musical. He played the role for about 3 years, from his grade four in elementary school to grade 1 in junior high school. Meanwhile, he also developed his enthusiasm towards anime, manga, and games while watching anime on TV, as he had to spend a lot of time by himself without siblings to play with when his mother was working.

After high school, Sekai went to New York City to improve his dancing, while looking for a way to become a professional dancer. He learnt a lot from New York dance crew Elite Force, and become a student of their original member Loose Joint. He was in the Top 4 at the dance event "Step Ya Game Up 2010" held in New York in 2010. As he returned to Japan, he began to serve as a backup dancer for various artists. In 2010, he took part in Miriam Yeung's World Tour Live "Ladies&Gentlemen" in Hong Kong as a backup dancer. He also served as a backup dancer for Daichi Miura in 2011 and for Ketsumeishi in 2011 and 2013 at their tours, and he appeared in Daichi Miura's "Shout It -Live Edition-". In 2012, he won at the hip hop section of "Step Ya Game Up 2012". He also worked part time as an instructor for EXPG Tokyo, and has given lesson to all members of the future Jr. Exile (the collective of Generations, The Rampage, Fantastic and Ballistik Boyz from the Exile Tribe), including his future group mates of the Fantastic from the Exile Tribe.

In February 2013, Sekai performed in Dance Earth ~Inochi no Rhythm~, a stage play planned and produced by Exile USA at Shinagawa Stellar Ball in Tokyo.

== Career ==
At first, Sekai wanted to become an underground dancer who participated in dance battles all around the world, but facing the reality of earning a living with dancing, he realized that joining Exile would be an opportunity for him to achieve all his dreams. In February 2014, he participated in "Exile Performer Battle Audition", which is held to find new performers for Exile, and on April 27 of the same year, he was chosen as one of the five Exile's new performers during the final held in Nippon Budokan. He was one of two new members who were not already members of the Exile Tribe. On July 22, he changed his stage name from his real name to "Exile Sekai (Exile 世界)" like the old Exile members would do following the suggestion of Exile Hiro, though other new members and some old members have already dropped this tradition of using "Exile" as part of their stage name. On July 23, he made his major debut as a member of Exile with the release of the group's new single, "New Horizon". He also formed dance unit XXIV Clan (later changed to FTHEB in 2015) with friends that year, continuing to be active as an underground dancer. In 2015, he and XXIV Clan performed in Exile Shokichi's single "Ignition".

In January 2016, he performed in the music video of Generations from Exile Tribe's hit 'Ageha'. From July to September, he participated in High&Low the Live of the High&Low franchise. From December 25, 2016, to February 2, 2017, he also participated in Abema's online variety show DANCER'S PRIDE as one of the regular hosts. On December 29, 2016, he was announced as a member and leader (alongside Exile's member Taiki Sato) of the unit Fantastics from Exile Tribe. As Exile has suspended activities in September, Sekai began to focus more on Fantastic while improving his skill of video making, which he found himself passionate in. From 2016 to 2017, He also participated in various dance battles held in Germany, South Korea, Singapore and Japan.

In 2017, Sekai and dance unit Fantastics from Exile Tribe went on a nation-wide small-scale tour, the so-called Musha Shugyo ("Samurai training") from February 13 to April 16, during which the members traveled around the country and put on 50 performances in 14 cities. In June, Sekai and Fantastics from Exile Tribe travelled Taiwan to put on more shows there for their Musha Shugyo ("Samurai training") .

In 2018, as Exile resumed activities, he produced the lyric video of Exile's digital single "Step Up". On December 5, 2018, after being joined by the two vocalists who won "Vocal Battle Audition 5", he debuted in Fantastics from Exile Tribe with the single "Over Drive".

In January and February 2020, he played "Gentleman Thief" in Immersive theatre Sakura Hime in Minami-za. He also made an AR video for Fantastics from Exile Tribe 's first photobook Fantastic Nine, which was published on April 15. In April, he was appointed as a regular host at Iwate Asahi Television's information program "It's good! I want to see! I want to know! I want to go out!". In August, he started streaming games he liked on live streaming platform openrec.tv.

In April, 2021, LDH announced the production of an animation for its "mixed reality entertainment" project Battle of Tokyo as a crucial step for the project. Sekai took part in the production of the whole project, and he was also the man who did motion capture performance for the dances in the animation.

== Personal life ==
- Sekai's mother is Aoki Ryo, who used to be in Takarazuka Revue group and now ran a dance studio.
- He loves anime, manga, and games, and deems himself an otaku.
- On July 4, 2019, after the first day's performance of "Battle Of Tokyo-Enter The Jr. Exile-", he was diagnosed with a metatarsal bone fracture, due to which he could not appear on the stage in the following three days of the tour.

== Works ==
=== Choreography ===
Year	Title	Group	Notes
2018	Over Drive	Fantastics	Alongside Shota Nakao
2018	What a Wonder	Fantastics	Alongside Natsuki Hori
2019	Supersonic	Generations vs Fantastics	MV version; alongside Yuta Nakatsuka
2020	Hey, darlin'	Fantastics	Alongside Natsuki Sawamoto
2020	High Fever	Fantastics	
2020	Cannonball	Fantastics	

== Participating groups ==
Period	Group	Ref.
2014–present	Exile	
2014–present	FTHEB	
2017–present	Fantastics from Exile Tribe	

== Filmography ==
=== Anime ===
Year	Title	Role	Ref.
2025	I Left My A-Rank Party to Help My Former Students Reach the Dungeon Depths!	Barry	

=== TV dramas ===
Year	Title	Network	Notes	Ref.
2016	Night Hero Naoto	TV Tokyo	Ending Dance	

=== Stage ===
Year	Title	Role	Ref.
2001–2003	Gekidanshiki "Lion King"	Young Simba	
2013	Dance Earth ~Inochi no Rhythm~		
2020	Sakura Hime	Gentleman Thief	

=== Internet shows ===
Year	Title	Network	Ref.
2016–2017	Dancer's Pride	Abema TV	

=== TV shows ===
Year	Title	Network	Ref.
2020–	It's good! I want to see! I want to know! I want to go out!"	Iwate Asahi Television'	

=== Live ===
Year	Artist	Title	Notes
2010	Miriam Yeung	World Tour Live Hong Kong "Ladies&Gentlemen"	
2011	Daichi Miura	Daichi Miura Live Tour 2011 ～Synesthesia～	
2011	Ketsumeishi	"Aretsu? Kono Ojisantachi Mitakotoaru! Soudesu! Shita no Hou de Fes 2011 Tettere♪"	
2013	Ketsumeishi	"Yami Kara Hikari e Nyoui Doun! Ketsumeishi Tsua 2013 ~etsu? Tsuika Kouen? Itsu Yaru no? …Imadesho!"	

=== Music Videos ===
Year	Artist	Title	Ref.
2011	Shimizu Shota	Madaowaranai	
2011	Miura Daichi	Shout It -Live Edition-	
2015	Exile Shokichi	Ignition	
2016	Generations from Exile Tribe	AGEHA	

=== Advertisements ===
Year	Title	Ref.
2014	ABC Mart "adidas CLIMACOOL"	
2016	Suntory: "The Malt's Rooftop" version"	

=== Other ===
Years	Title	Notes	Ref
2016, 2017, 2018	street dance contest "dance Cup"	Official Supporter	2016; 2017; 2018

== Producing ==
Year	Title	Artist	Ref.
2018	"Step Up" (Lyric Video)	Exile	
