= Yuta Nakatsuka =

Japanese dancer and actor

- 中務裕太
- Born: 7 January 1993 (age 32); Osaka Prefecture, Japan
- Occupation: Dancer
- Years active: 2011–present
- Musical career
- Genres: J-pop, Dance
- Labels: LDH, Rhythm Zone
- Website: www.ldh.co.jp/eng/management/nakatsuka//

Yuta Nakatsuka (中務裕太 Nakatsuka Yuta, born 7 January 1993) is a Japanese Dancer and actor, He is one of the performers of the Japanese all-male dance and music group Generations from Exile Tribe.

Nakatsuka is represented with LDH.

== Early life ==
Yuta Nakatsuka was born on January 7, 1993, in Osaka, Japan.

Yuta got interested in dancing due to his mother's love for American music, especially Black music. With his mother's influence he grew up listening to artists such as Stevie Wonder, Babyface and Eric Clapton, but no Japanese music at all. She even took him to live shows of Earth Wind & Fire and other artists. At the age of 6, Yuta decided to become a dancer and started attending the dance school "Dance Studio BOOM" in Ibaraki, Osaka, which was recommended by his parents. There, he met his first dance teachers, the choreographer duo Hilty & Bosch. They taught an acrobatics class and also inspired Yuta to start Locking. Despite being the youngest in their class, Yuta stood out as one of the best students. At the same dance school, Yuta also took classes of other instructors such as Boo (the owner of the dance school), Cherry from Wild Cherry, Rei (the father of You from Hilty & Bosch), Yuki (boss of Osaka dancer) and Skeeter Rabbit (member of The Electric Boogaloos) because he was interested to try out all kinds of dance styles. When he was 16, Yuta started attending EXPG Osaka, LDH's talent school, after he was scouted by the company during a dance event from Dance Studio BOOM. He was chosen to become an instructor there in the same year due to the high level of his skills. His most notable former student at EXPG Osaka is Twice's Sana.

When Yuta was 18 years old, he moved to Tokyo. At that time, he had troubles deciding what his future as a dancer should look like. While he was part of the Popping crew Yuki Dojo from his former dancing instructor Yuki at Dance Studio BOOM, they won 2nd place at the JAPAN DANCE DELIGHT vol.18 dance tournament. This experience had a major impact on Yuta's life since he was selected as a support member for Generations in 2011. Yuki then sent him off with the best wishes to find his path for the future and the promise that he can return to Yuki's crew any time, which motivated Yuta to do his best in his career as an artist.

== Career ==
In 2012, and just before the group's major debut, he became an official member after Keita Machida's withdrawal.

In March 2014, he participated in Exile Performer Battle Audition and made it to the finals but wasn't selected to join EXILE.

In October 2019, he made his acting debut in the movie "High & Low The Worst".

== Works ==
=== Choreography ===
Year	Title	Group	Notes
2013	Love You More	Generations from Exile Tribe	
2014	Never Let You Go	Generations from Exile Tribe	Alongside Reo Sano
2015	All for You	Generations from Exile Tribe	Alongside Reo Sano
2016	Rainy Room	Generations from Exile Tribe	Alongside Reo Sano
2017	Big City Rodeo	Generations from Exile Tribe	Peek-a-boo dance (inai inai ba dance)
2019	Supersonic	Generations vs Fantastics	MV version; alongside Sekai

== Filmography ==
=== Movies ===
Year	Title	Role	Ref.
2019	High & Low The Worst	Shinya Orochi	
2023	Sana	Himself	
2024	Sana: Let Me Hear	Himself	

=== TV Dramas ===
Year	Title	Network	Notes
2016	Night Hero Naoto	TV Tokyo	Ending Dance

=== TV shows ===
Year	Title	Network
2016-2017	Dancer's Pride	Abema TV

=== Live ===
Year	Artist	Title	Notes
2008	EXILE	EXILE LIVE DOME TOUR 2008 Osaka performance	As a dancer
2009	EXILE	EXILE LIVE TOUR 2009 MONSTER	As a dancer
2010	Doberman Inc.	DOBERMAN INC. SECRET BASE Victory ～SEASON 3～	As a dancer
2010	EXILE	EXILE LIVE TOUR 2010 FANTASY	As a dancer
2011	Nidaime J Soul Brothers VS Sandaime J Soul Brothers	〜EXILE TRIBE〜 Live Tour 2011	As a dancer

== Awards ==
=== Dance Competitions ===
Year	Title	Result	Notes
2005	number one	Won	First prize
2006	DANCE ATTACK	Won	Second prize
2008	Soul full Sunday vol.2"	Won	First prize
2010	Gudaguda Ibaraki 2ON 2	Won	Second prize
