= Loveli =

Japanese model and television personality

- ラブリ
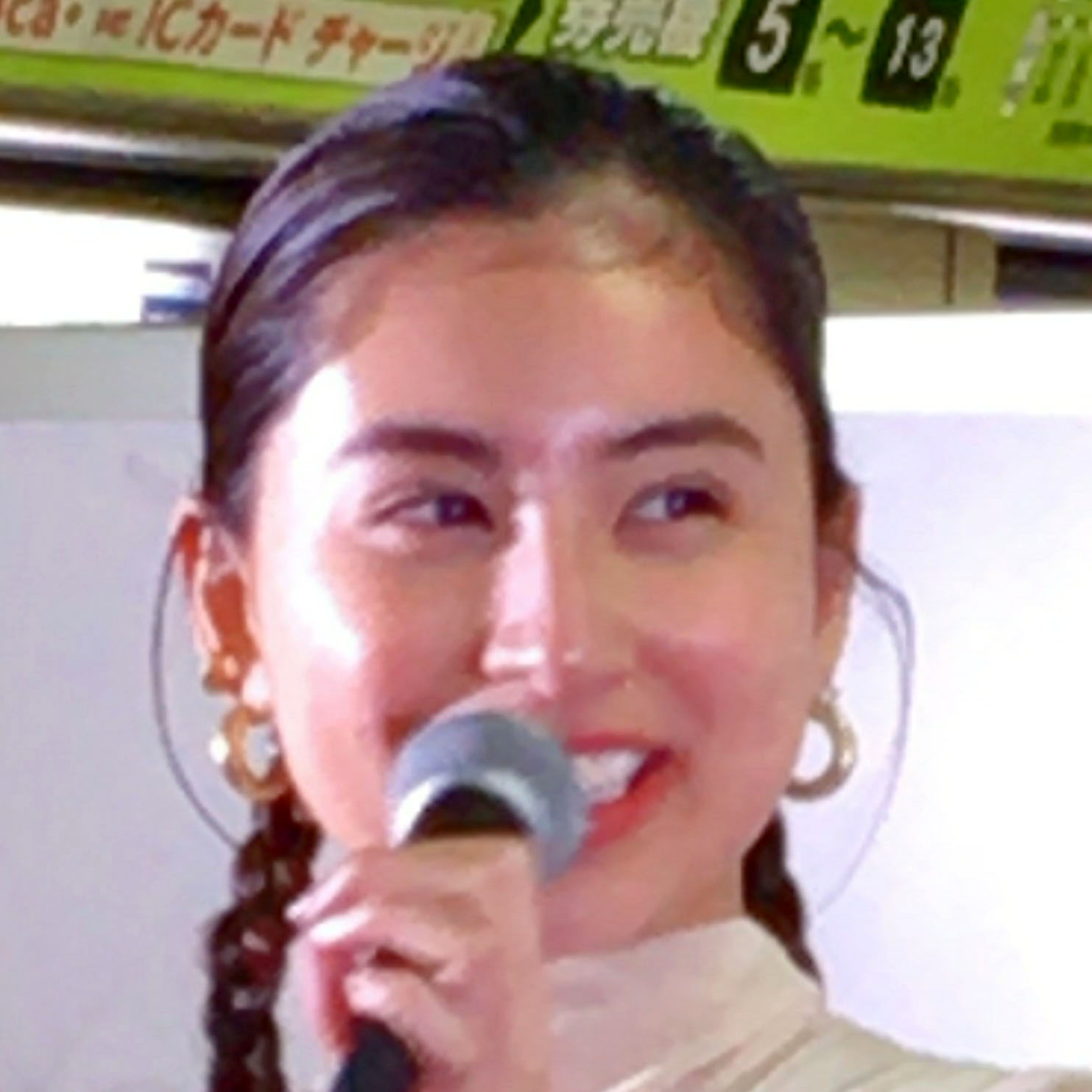
- Born: Izumi Shirahama (白濱愛); November 27, 1989 (age 36); Matsuyama, Ehime, Japan
- Occupations: Fashion model; television personality
- Years active: 2010–present
- Agent: Pyramid
- Height: 1.65 m (5 ft 5 in)
- Spouse: Gōta Yonekura (m. 2019)
- Children: 1
- Relatives: Alan Shirahama (brother); Ryu (brother)
- Website: lovelizm.com

Izumi Shirahama (白濱愛, Shirahama Izumi; born November 27, 1989), professionally known by the mononym Loveli (ラブリ, Raburi) is a Japanese fashion model and television personality.

== Life and career ==
Loveli was born as Izumi Shirahama on November 27, 1989, in Matsuyama, Ehime, to a Filipino mother and Japanese father. She started her career as reporter working for Fuji TV in 2010. She also worked as a yoga instructor. She later worked as a weather forecaster for Nippon Television, before becoming a model for JJ magazine in 2013.

Loveli is the elder sister of Alan Shirahama, a member of the all-male J-pop groups Generations from Exile Tribe and Exile.
