= Sway (Japanese rapper) =

SWAY
- 野替 愁平
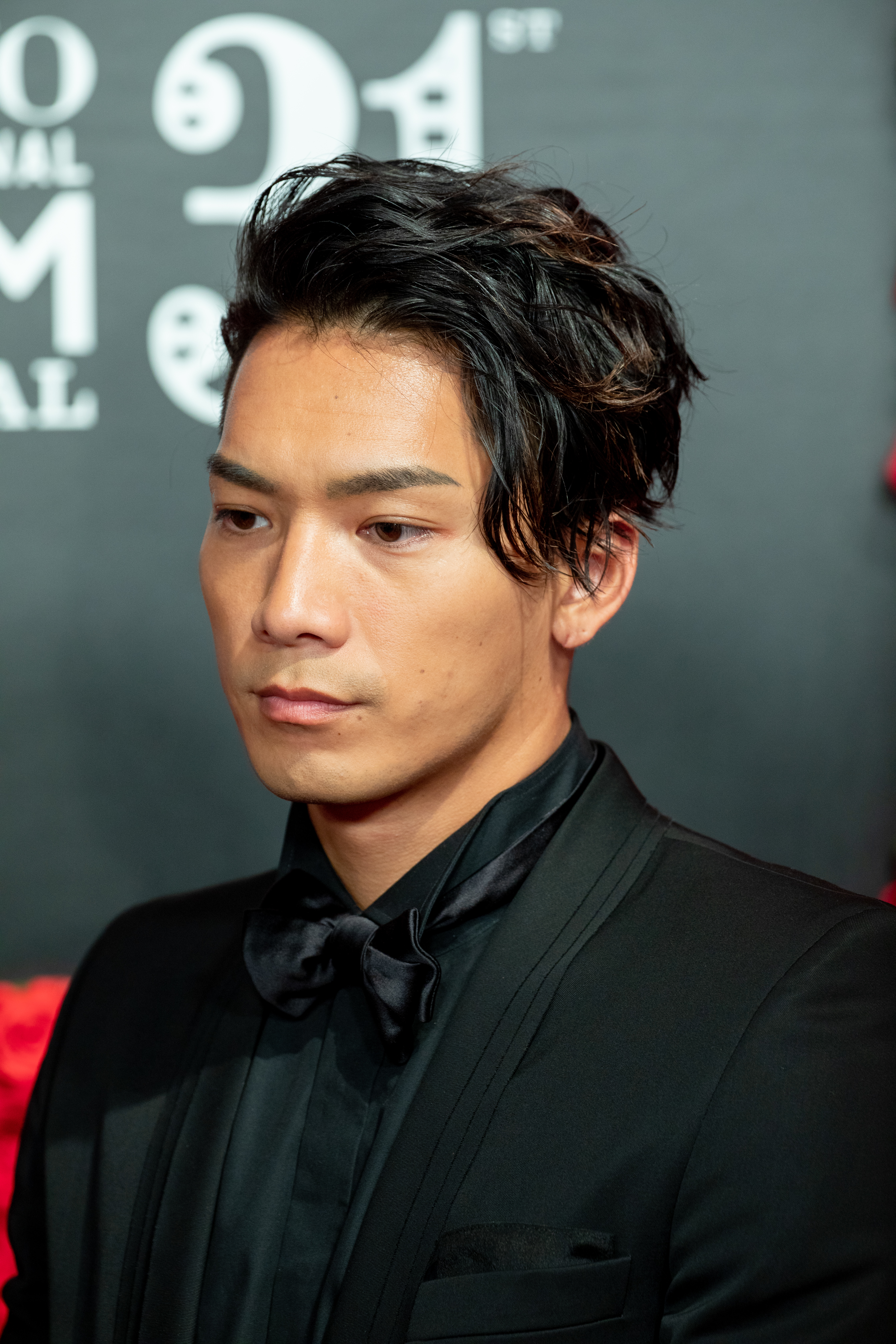
- Sway from "jam" at Opening Ceremony of the Tokyo International Film Festival 2018
- Born: Shuhei Nogae; June 9, 1986 (age 40); Sapporo, Hokkaido Prefecture, Japan
- Occupations: Rapper, lyricist, actor, producer
- Years active: 2012 – present
- Agent: LDH
- Height: 180 cm (5 ft 11 in)
- Musical career
- Genres: Rap, Hip hop music
- Labels: Toy's Factory (2014–2017); Def Jam Recordings (2017–present)
- Website: sway-official.jp

Shuhei Nogae (野替愁平, Nogae Shuhei; born June 9, 1986), better known with his stage name SWAY (stylized in all capitals) is a Japanese rapper and actor. He is signed to Def Jam Recordings and is a member of the group Doberman Infinity, of EXILE's theater company (Gekidan EXILE).

== Early life ==
Shuhei Nogae was born on June 9, 1986, in Sapporo, Hokkaido Prefecture, Japan. Growing up, Shuhei was a huge fan of basketball, especially the NBA. He would regularly buy the sports magazine Hoop and at one point, he read an article about Allen Iverson and Kobe Bryant doing some rapping. Since they were his idols during his junior high school years, he became interested in rap music and hip-hop culture. For this reason he started singing and DJing as a hobby. In the 3rd grade of junior high school, he started learning graphic design and break dance besides his other activities. He also produced a dance track, wrote lyrics and started to rap.

At the age of 16, his mindset changed and he became serious about a career as a rapper after watching the movie 8 Mile. The impact of the movie led him to choose a stage name by searching through an English-Japanese dictionary. The word 'sway' stuck with him since its sound was close to his birth name and he also liked the meaning. However, he faced a huge problem starting as a rapper: He didn't know what he should write about in his lyrics and felt like his experiences didn't matter since his life had been so different from the American rappers he listened to. He overcame this obstacle by realizing there were also famous rappers who talked about fairly normal things in their lyrics, such as Kanye West for example.

Sway formed a group called Wild Style with his close friend Shokichi when he was 17 and they performed together during their late teens until Sway moved to Toronto, Canada where he lived and studied for two years from 19 to 21 years old while doing various part-time jobs including waiting tables at a Japanese restaurant.

After returning to Hokkaido, he worked at a clothing store while rapping in the evenings. Despite enjoying both jobs, he envisioned his future differently. In his mid-twenties, he decided to move to Tokyo and perform there at clubs. During that time, Shokichi, who was now a member of famous J-Pop boygroup Exile, called him and stated he wanted to make music together again. Therefore they wrote three songs and Shokichi presented them to Exile leader Hiroyuki Igarashi who approved of their work.

== Career ==
Subsequently, Sway signed with LDH, the company founded by Exile.

In August 2012, he debuted as an actor in the stage play Attack No. 1 and in September, he joined Gekidan Exile (Exile's theater company). Since then he started to work both in music and acting.

In June 2014, he joined the group Doberman Infinity. Two years later in April 2016, he also joined the hip-hop group Honest Boyz.

On September 16, 2017, he announced his major solo debut with single "Manzana", which was released on November 1 under Universal Music Japan's sub-label Def Jam Recordings. On November 11, Sway formed the creative unit "N0IR (Noir)".

On August 29, 2018, he released his debut album titled Unchained. On December 12, 2018, he announced that he would use "Sway" also during acting activities that used his real name.

== Participating groups ==
Group	Period
Gekidan Exile	(September 2012 – present)
Doberman Infinity	(June 2014 – present)
Honest Boyz	(April 2016 – present)
N0IR	(November 2017 – present)

== Discography ==
=== Studio albums ===
Year	Title	Release date	Chart positions
Year	Title	Release date	Oricon Albums Chart
2012	The S	June 15	–
2018	Unchained	August 29	11

=== Singles ===
Year	Title	Release date	Chart positions		Album
Year	Title	Release date	Oricon Singles Chart	Billboard Japan Hot 100	Album
2017	"Manzana"	November 1	5	16	Unchained

=== Digital singles ===
Year	Title	Release date	Album	Ref.
2018	"Perfect Love"	July 18	Unchained	
2018	"Never Say Goodbye"	August 22	Unchained	
2019	"Chocolate" (チョコレート)	February 14		
2019	"On Fire"	October 10		
2019	"Angels"	December 18		

=== Participating works ===
Year	Release date	Song	Artist and Album
2009	December 2	I Like It feat. SWAY	Hiromi "Hot Chocolate"
2013	February 27	Cazal feat. SWAY & YOU THE ROCK☆	DJ Ken Watanabe "Cazal feat. SWAY & YOU THE ROCK☆"
2013	August 7	Summer Vacation feat. SWAY	Klooz "Summer Vacation feat. SWAY"
2014	March 5	Signal Fire feat. SWAY	Exile The Second "HE II AGE"
2014	March 5	Movie Star feat. SWAY	Super Sonic "SCRATCH YOUR WORLD"
2014	March 26	S.A.K.U.R.A.	Sandaime J Soul Brothers from EXILE TRIBE "S.A.K.U.R.A."
2014	April 9	Amazing Girl feat. SWAY	Koudai Sato "Magic Carpet Ride"
2014	June 4	BACK TO THE FUTURE / EXILE Shokichi feat. VERBAL (M-Flo) & SWAY	Exile Shokichi "BACK TO THE FUTURE"
2014	June 4	THE ANTHEM / EXILE SHOKICHI, DOBERMAN INC, SWAY, ELLY (Sandaime J Soul Brothers from EXILE TRIBE)	Exile Shokichi "BACK TO THE FUTURE"
2014	June 11	LIGHTS	Sway × Hiyadam "LIGHTS"
2014	June 18	Organ Donor 〜 OFF DA HOOK 〜 / DJ Makidai feat. Generations from Exile Tribe & SWAY	DJ Makidai from Exile "EXILE TRIBE PERFECT MIX"
2014	August 6	Pop!! feat. SHUN, SWAY, KLOOZ / KEN THE 390	V.A. "DREAM BOY BEST MIX vol.1- MIXED BY DJ HIRORON"
2014	October 22	Rock the party feat. SWAY, Staxx T(CREAM), APOLLO, Kotobuki-Kun, KIRA	Shimotaku "Rock the party feat. SWAY, Staxx T(CREAM), APOLLO, Kotobuki-Kun, KIRA"
2014	December 10	WANNA SAY feat. SWAY & MATT CAB	Jolly-Tip a.k.a DJ Keizi "WANNA SAY feat. SWAY & MATT CAB"
2015	January 14	ONE feat. SWAY & Koudai Sato	Jolly-Tip a.k.a DJ Keizi "JOLLY-TIP STORY"
2015	May 20	Call Your Name feat. SWAY	Matt Cab "Call Your Name feat. SWAY"
2015	September 9	Orenojikan (feat. SWAY)	MAD "Orenojikan (feat. SWAY)"
2015	September 16	REVOLUTION (PKCZ Remix feat. SWAY)	Crystal Kay feat. Namie Amuro "REVOLUTION"
2015	September 16	Heart Breaker feat. SWAY	Thelma Aoyama "GRAY SMOKE"
2016	April 27	Rock City feat. SWAY & Crystal Kay	Exile Shokichi "THE FUTURE"
2016	June 15	MIGHTY WARRIORS / PKCZ feat. CRAZYBOY, ANARCHY, SWAY, MIGHTY CROWN (MASTA SIMON & SAMI-T	V.A. "HiGH&LOW ORIGINAL BEST ALBUM"
2016	June 15	FUNK JUNGLE / ANARCHY, SWAY & CRAZYBOY	V.A. "HiGH&LOW ORIGINAL BEST ALBUM"
2016	June 15	BBFL / SWAY & ANARCHY	V.A. "HiGH&LOW ORIGINAL BEST ALBUM"
2017	February 24	CLAPTIME feat. ANARCHY, VERBAL, SWAY, DABO	Crazyboy "NEOTOKYO EP"
2017	August 2	Beauty Mark feat. Hiroomi Tosaka, SWAY	PKCZ "360° ChamberZ"
2017	August 2	Mighty Warriors (Album Ver) feat. Afrojack, Crazyboy, Anarchy, Sway, Mighty Warriors (MASTA SIMON&SAMI-T)	PKCZ "360° ChamberZ"
2017	August 30	Baby Baby Baby feat. SWAY	Koudai Sato "Baby Baby Baby feat. SWAY"
2017	October 25	Dream Boys	Mighty Warriors "HiGH&LOW THE MIGHTY WARRIORS"
2017	October 25	Good Life	Mighty Warriors "HiGH&LOW THE MIGHTY WARRIORS"
2018	January 19	Alive feat. SWAY	Crazyboy "NEOTOKYO III EP"
2018	September 19	Kissing Pt.2 feat. SWAY	Cream "Sounds Good"
2019	January 19	RUN 100 feat. Miliyah Kato & Sway	Run The Floor "RUN 100 feat. Miliyah Kato & Sway"
2019	November 6	Superstar	V.A. "Another Voice -Full Of Harmony Tribute Album-"

=== Lyrics ===
Song	Artist
FUNK JUNGLE	Anarchy, Sway & Crazyboy
Heartbreaker	Thelma Aoyama
REVOLUTION (PKCZ Remix feat. SWAY)	Crystal Kay
24WORLD	Exile Tribe
BACK TO THE FUTURE	EXILE Shokichi
#HOTLINE	EXILE Shokichi
Loveholic	EXILE Shokichi
Rock City	EXILE Shokichi
THE ANTHEM	EXILE Shokichi
Signal Fire feat. SWAY	Exile The Second
S.A.K.U.R.A.	Sandaime Jsoul Brothers
Rock The Party feat. SWAY, Staxx T(CREAM), APOLLO, Kotobuki-kun, KIRA	Shimotaku
BBFL	Sway & Anarchy

== Live ==
Period	Title	Ref.
From December 12, 2018 to January 27, 2019	SWAY "LIVE SHOWCASE 2018 UNCHAINED"	

== Filmography ==
=== Movies ===
Year	Title	Role	Notes	Director	Ref.
2013	Aragure	Satoshi Yamagachi		Hajime Gonno	
2014	Aragure II ROPPONGI v.s. SHIBUYA	Satoshi Yamagachi		Hajime Gonno	
2014	Crows Explode	Kenichi Kadozumi		Toshiaki Toyoda	
2014	Hot Road	Akane		Takahiro Miki	
2016	Road to High & Low	Pearl		Sigeaki Kubo	
2016	High & Low The Movie	Pearl		Sigeaki Kubo	
2017	High & Low The Movie 2 / End of Sky	Pearl		Sigeaki Kubo	
2017	High & Low The Movie 3 / Final Mission	Pearl		Sigeaki Kubo	
2018	Jam	Minatochu		Sabu	
2019	Manriki			Yasuhiko Shimizu	
2021	Struggling Man			Toshio Lee	
2024	Silent Love			Eiji Uchida	

=== TV Dramas ===
Year	Title	Role	Network	Notes	Ref.
2012	Sugarless	Isami Morita	NTV		
2013	Kamen Teacher	Jiro Inukami	NTV	(ep.10–12)	
2015	Senryokugai Sousakan	Teppei Tokui (Ponzara)	NTV	2 hours special	
2015	Wild Heroes	Teppei Tokui (Ponzara)	NTV	Lead role	
2015	High & Low The Story of S.W.O.R.D.	Pearl	NTV		
2016	High & Low Season 2	Pearl	NTV		
2018	Kiss Shitai Matsuge	Toshimitsu Saijo	Fuji TV	Lead role	

=== Stage ===
Year	Title	Ref.
2012	Hounangumi x Gekidan EXILE "Attack No. 1"	
2012	BS – TBS shūkaku-sai	
2013	Gekidan EXILE performance "SADAKO ~ birth sad story ~	
2013	GEKIDAN EXILE "Attack No.1"	
2014	Karuseoraria	
2014	Gekidan EXILE Attack No. 1 Spin-off reading play	
2014	Gekidan EXILE "THE mensetsu"	
2016	Hounangumi presents reading play "Aitakute..."	
2020	Gekidan Exile "Yusha no Tame ni Kane wa Naru / The Bell Rings for the Brave"	

=== CM ===
Year	Title	Ref.
2016	Youfuku no Aoyama "Summer Suits"	

=== Commercials ===
Year	Title	Ref.
2017	Vanilla air Hakodate PR poster	
2017	Reebook	
2017	AdamHavve by schopfung 2018 Spring / Summer "SUPERNATURAL POWER" Brand Promotion Video	
2019	G-Star Raw Japan "G-Star Raw Elwood × N0IR" Promotion movie series	

=== Voice Acting ===
Year	Title	Role	Ref.
2017	HiGH & LOW g-sword Animation DVD Special Edition	Pearl	

=== Music Videos ===
Year	Artist	Title	Ref.
2014	Sandaime J Soul Brothers	S.A.K.U.R.A.	
2014	EXILE Shokichi	BACK TO THE FUTURE	
2016	EXILE Shokichi	Rock City feat. SWAY & Crystal Kay	
2017	Bigzam	I Got a Dream	
2018	EXILE Shokichi	Underdog	
2019	Noritake Kinashi	GG STAND UP!! feat. Takahiro Matsumoto	
