= Generation Ex =

Generation Ex may refer to:

- "Generation Ex" (song), a 2007 song by Kent
- Generation Ex (album), a 2015 album by Generations from Exile Tribe
