= Reo Sano =

Japanese dancer and actor

- 佐野 玲於
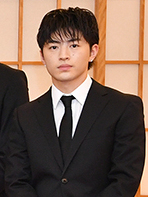
- Born: 8 January 1996 (age 30); Tokyo, Japan
- Other name: Lil Twiggz
- Occupations: Dancer, Actor
- Years active: 2011–present
- Height: 170 cm (5 ft 7 in)
- Musical career
- Genres: J-pop, Dance
- Labels: LDH, Rhythm Zone
- Member of: Generations from Exile Tribe
- Website: www.ldh.co.jp/eng/management/Sano//

Reo Sano (佐野 玲於 Sano Reo, born 8 January 1996) is a Japanese dancer and actor. He is one of the performers and the youngest member of the Japanese all-male dance and music group Generations from Exile Tribe.

== Career ==
In 2006, Sano started attending Tokyo's EXPG (Exile professional Gym) where he has practiced KRUMP dance.

In April 2011, he was selected as a candidate of Generations through an audition held in EXPG and in April 2012 he became an official member.

In March 2014, he participated in Exile Performer Battle Audition and made it to the finals but wasn't selected to join Exile.

In July 2014, he made his acting debut with drama GTO.

He is member of the Krump group Twiggz Fam and also of Rag Pound.

In July 2018, he made his first lead role in the movie "Rainbow Days".

== Works ==
=== Choreography ===
Group choreography
Year	Title	Notes
2014	Never Let You Go	Alongside Yuta Nakatsuka
2015	Sing It Loud	
2015	Evergreen	
2015	All for You	Alongside Yuta Nakatsuka
2016	Rainy Room	Alongside Yuta Nakatsuka
2017	Stupid ~Makka na bracelet~	

== Filmography ==
=== TV Dramas ===
Year	Title	Role	Network	Notes	Ref
2012	Sugarless	Shiro Mukai	NTV		
2014	Impei Sousa	Kunihiko Ryuzaki	TBS		
2014	Great Teacher Onizuka season 2	Taichi Usami	Fuji TV, KTV		
2015	High & Low ~The Story Of S.W.O.R.D.~	Takeshi	NTV		
2016	High & Low Season 2	Takeshi	NTV		
2016	Night Hero Naoto		TV Tokyo	Episode 5 (ending dance)	
2018	Prince of Legend	Aoi Ayanokoji	NTV		
2023	Informa	Kanji Mishima	KTV		
2024	Informa (season 2)	Kanji Mishima	Abema		

- 无序列表项

=== Movies ===
Year	Title	Role	Notes	Ref.
2016	Road To High & Low	Takeshi		
2016	High & Low The Movie	Takeshi		
2017	High & Low The Movie 2 End of Sky	Takeshi		
2017	High & Low The Movie 3 Final Mission	Takeshi		
2018	Rainbow Days	Natsuki Hashiba	Lead role	
2018	Hanalei Bay	Takashi		
2019	Prince of Legend	Aoi Ayanokoji	Nominated for the Best Supporting Actor Award at the 99th Japanese Drama Academy Awards	
2019	That Moment, My Heart Cried	baku		
2020	Kizoku Kourin: Prince of Legend	Aoi Ayanokoji		
2023	Sana	Himself	Lead role	

=== Short films ===
Year	Title	Role	Ref.
2018	Tiffany Blue		
2019	Cinema Fighters Project "Ghosting"	Baku	

=== Stageplay ===
Year	Title
2008	Gekidan Exile's "Crown ~ Nemuranai, Yoruno Hateni..."
2020	Reading drama Book Act "Mou ichido kimi to odoritai/ I want to dance with you again"

=== Game ===
Year	Title	Role	Notes
2019	Prince Of Legend Love Royale	Aoi Ayanokoji	Released on March 25; Available on iOS / Android

=== TV shows ===
Years	Title	Network	Notes
2006-2007	Holly holly PopTV	TV Saitama	
2006-2007	Monomane Battle	NTV	Appearance as a dancer

=== Internet Shows ===
Years	Title	Network
2016-2017	Dancer's Pride	AbemaTV

=== Advertisements ===
Year	Title	Ref.
2007	EPSON Home Projector "dreamio"	
2007	Adidas 2007 spring & summer collection	
2015	Moist Diane "Extra Shine"	
2015	Samantha vega	
2016	SoftBank "Sponavi Live"	
2017	Tokyo Nishikawa "Afit"	
2018	Aoyama Tailor "Aoyama Prestige Technology"	
2018	Tokyo Nishikawa "Afit" (Season movie "Autumn")	
2019	NTT Docomo × RAG POUND	
2019	Nishikawa "Home Makes"	

=== Music videos ===
Year	Artist	Title	Notes
2005	Razor Ramon HG	Young Man (Y.M.C.A)	Appearance as a Dancer
2007	GReeeeN	High G.K Low (～ハジケロ～)	
2008	EXILE	Choo Choo TRAIN	Appearance as CHIBIXILE
2008	EXILE	Gingatetsudou 999	Appearance as CHIBIXILE
2010	Love	Kataomoi	
2018	Crazyboy	Private Party	
2018	Honest Boyz	Tokyo Dip	
2019	Okamoto's	Dancing Boy	

=== Live ===
Year	Artist	Title	Notes
2007	W-inds	W-inds Live Tour 2006 Thanks Budokan Performance	as a dancer
2007	Exile	Exile Live Tour 2007 Exile Evolution	as a dancer
2007	Exile	Rhythm Nation 2007	as a dancer
2008	Exile	Exile Live Tour "Perfect Live 2008"	as a dancer
2010	Exile	Exile Live Tour 2010 "Fantasy"	as a dancer

=== Voice acting ===
Year	Title	Role
2017	High & Low g-sword Animation DVD Special Edition	Takeshi

== Photobook ==
	Year	Release date	Title	Ref.
1st	2018	November 15	Sano San (さのさん)	
