= Ballistik Boyz from Exile Tribe =

J-pop group

- Also known as: Ballistik Boyz; BBZ; Balli
- Origin: Japan
- Genres: J-pop; dance-pop; hip hop
- Years active: 2018–present
- Labels: LDH, Rhythm Zone
- Spinoff of: Exile; Exile Tribe; Doberman Infinity
- Members: Ryuta Hidaka; Yoshiyuki Kanou; Ryusei Kainuma; Miku Fukahori; Rikiya Okuda; Riki Matsui; Masahiro Sunada
- Website: Ballistik Boyz

Ballistik Boyz from Exile Tribe (Japanese: バリスティック ボーイズ・フロム・エグザイル・トライブ, stylized as BALLISTIK BOYZ from EXILE TRIBE ) is a seven-member Japanese male dance, vocal and rap group formed and managed by LDH. The group is part of the collective Exile Tribe as well as Jr.Exile and are currently signed to the record label LDH Records.

They are the first group in Exile Tribe where all members are holding microphones to sing and rap while dancing. The group consists of seven members: Ryuta, Yoshiyuki, Ryusei, Miku, Rikiya, Riki and Masahiro

Ballistik Boyz debuted with their first album, Ballistik Boyz, on May 22, 2019.

== History ==
=== 2011-2018: Formation and pre-debut ===
Prior to their formation Miku Fukahori, Rikiya Okuda, and Masahiro Sunada (from 2011-2014) and Ryuta Hidaka (from 2014-2017) were members of the trainee group EXILE GENERATIONS. Hidaka had also previously competed and was a finalist in "Vocal Battle Audition 4" in 2013.

Fukahori, Okuda, and Sunada competed and were the winners of 2014's "Global Japan Challenge" which formed Project TARO, a joint project by Avex and LDH to find talented young male artists from Japan and train them in New York for three and a half years.The three were part of the program from 2014 to 2018, whereupon they graduated

After EXILE GENERATIONS was discontinued in 2017, Hidaka along with EXPG students Ryusei Kainuma and Riki Matsui became members of EXPG Lab's trainee group Crasher Kidz. In the same year Hidaka, Kainuma, Matsui and Yoshiyuki Kanou participated "Vocal Battle Audition 5" where they were all finalists, Hidaka and Kanou in the vocal division and Kainuma and Matsui in the rap division.

In April 2018, Exile Hiro and Doberman Infinity decided to produce a new group and chose the 4 finalists from VBA5, plus three members from Project TARO. They would become the first group in Exile Tribe where all members would holding microphones to sing and rap while dancing, deferring from the model of performers and vocalists that all former groups had.

On May 1, 2018, the group's formation was announced on TBS TV show "Weekly Exile" (週刊EXILE).

Starting May 12, the group participated as the opening act of Fantastics nation-wide small-scale tour, the so called, Musha shugyō,"FANTASTICS yume-sha shugyō FANTASTIC 9". They were also performing as opening act of Dance Earth Party's 3-day festival Dance Earth Festival 2018 ~Splash Summer~ on July 14, 15 and 16, 2018.

=== 2019: Major debut and Battle of Tokyo ===
From March 2 to 31, 2019, Ballistik Boyz launched their own nation-wide small-scale Musha shugyō tour.

On March 31, it was announced that the group would make their major-label debut on May 22 with a self-titled album. On the same day, the group released their first official music video for the song "Tenhane 1000%", which was filmed in Los Angeles.

In June 2019, LDH's multimedia project "Battle of Tokyo", which includes all Jr.Exile groups, started. During this month the 4 groups released collaboration singles every week, until they released a full album titled Battle of Tokyo: Enter the Jr. Exile on July 3, 2019. Accompanying the album release, the groups held a row of live performances from July 4 to 7 with the same name.

On August 28 it was announced that Ballistik Boyz would release their first single "44Raiders" on October 23 accompanied by a row of release-events. In September, the group held performances in Malaysia and Taiwan and announced they would also perform in different countries across Asia in near future. On October 1, they released the music video for the title track of their new single and launched their own YouTube channel at the same time.

=== 2020: Additional singles and Live×Online ===
After performing in Indonesia, Thailand and Vietnam, it was announced that the group would release their second single "Anti-Hero's" on February 12, 2020, as the kickoff single for their first national tour Ballistik Boyz Live Tour 2020 "BBZ", which would take place from February 14 to April 25, 2020. The lead song “Anti-Hero's” of the second single includes a message from the life of Ballistik Boyz about pursuing what you truly believe: 'If you believe in yourself and fight without fear, you will truly shine.' Furthermore, all songs from the single were pre-delivered for digital streaming in a weekly manner starting with "Anti-Hero's" on January 22, followed by "Front Burner" on January 29, "Bang Out" on February 5 and "Strangers" on February 12.

On June 10, it was announced that due to COVID-19 pandemic, all remaining concerts were cancelled, therefore the tour finishing on February 22. On August 3, the group revealed their new digital single "Summer Hype" to be released on August 10. In compensation of the suspension of their tour, the group held a series of livestreamed concerts on the Japanese streaming platform AbemaTV from September to December. On December 31, the group took part in the joint livestreamed concert of LDH artists, Live×Online Countdown 2020▶2021"Rising Sun to the World".

=== 2021: Pass the Mic ===
On January 1, 2021, the group released their new single "Animal" on February 3. On February 17, it was announced that they would hold their second national tour, Ballistik Boyz Prologue Live Tour 2021 "Pass the Mic": Way to the Glory in March and April.

On April 18, a new album by Jr.Exile for the Battle of Tokyo project titled Battle of Tokyo Time 4 Jr.Exile was announced to be released on June 23, their individual song for the album "VIVA LA EVOLUCION" was released on May 5th, the music videos were released in a hybrid live-action/animated form, with this latter featuring the four groups' avatars. Moreover, the DVD version included the concert video of Battle of Tokyo: Enter the Jr.Exile held in Makuhari Messe in July 2019.

On August 4, they released their fourth single "Sum Baby", with a title track of the same name.

In October a continuation of their Pass the Mic tour took place with 16 shows from October to December.

On November 24, Ballistik Boyz released their second album Pass the Mic, it includes all their singles since their debut plus the album's promotional track "All Around the World" with a total of 18 songs.

On December 8, the group released the tribute single "Ballistik Boyz from Exile" as a part of Exile's 20th anniversary celebration project "Exile Tribute", the single is the second of the four consecutive tribute singles releases by Jr.Exile groups.

=== 2022-2023: Global Expansion ===
On May 25, the group released their fifth single "Last Dance ni BYE BYE".

From August 2022 to January 2023, Ballistik Boyz and Psychic Fever from Exile Tribe were based in Thailand for a six-month Musha shugyō as part of a partnership between LDH Japan and Thai entertainment company High Cloud Entertainment, with Thai rapper F.Hero serving as their general producer during the programme. The groups' Thai activities were documented in the reality series New School Breakin', which aired on YouTube from October 2022 to March 2023.

As part of their Thailand activities, they performed at the BIG MOUNTAIN MUSIC FESTIVAL 12 on December 10 and 11, for which they trended on twitter. They also performed their collaboration song "Drop Dead" with TRINITY, a 3-member T-Pop boy group, and produced by F.HERO.for the first time.In December, they received the Asia Rising Stars Award at the Thailand Digital Awards

In December, they released the digital single "Dramatic wo Nokoshitai". The song was used as the official theme song of the SoftBank Winter Cup 2022 tournament. They also participated in the Jr.EXILE LIVE-EXPO 2022, a new year countdown concert featuring all 5 Jr. Exile groups.

In February 2023, a global version of the group's official fanclub was opened and they held the joint concert Ballistik Boyz vs Psychic Fever The Survival 2023 at CentralWorld in Bangkok, to conclude the six-month Thailand programme. "Drop Dead" with TRINITY was also officially released on February 16th.

From From April 21 to June 30, the group held their tour BALLISTIK BOYZ LIVE TOUR 2023 "N.E.X.T. with 16 shows across Japan. TRINITY were special guests for the final Tokyo show, for which a video and audio recording was released.

On May 22, the group's 4th debut anniversary, they announced the launch of their apparel brand HYSFORM™. On May 31, the group released their sixth single "Ding Ding Dong".

On August 29, BALLISTIK BOYZ released the song "All I Ever Wanted" featuring Thai actor Gulf Kanawut as their third digital single. The song later served as the title track of their seventh single overall and second single under High Cloud Entertainment, released on October 4.

From September 2023 to February 2024, along with The Rampage and Psychic Fever, they performed at several events in Thailand besides their activities in Japan. At "NIPPON HAKU BANGKOK 2023", the group also received the "Thailand - Japan Ambassador 2023" award, for serving as a bridge between Thailand and Japan in 2023.

The self produced song "N.E.X.T.", written and produced by members Fukahori, Okuda, and Matsui was released as their fourth digital single on December 23rd. On the same day, it was announced that the group's new song "God Mode" would serve as the theme song of the team "SIGMA SQUAD" from the 2024 TV anime Bucchigiri?!.

=== 2024: Back & Fourth, Nippon Budokan Concert ===
On February 21, they released their third studio album Back & Forth, it includes all the songs on their singles released in 2023 with the song "In My Head" Serving as the promotional single for a total of 12 songs.

on March 14th the group's first show "BALLI BALLI! BALLISTIK BOYZ" started airing on NTV. The program featured the group touring Thailand and performing in music festivals The theme song for the program, "Meant to be" featuring Thai artists F.HERO and BOOM BOOM CASH, was released on March 28 as their fifth digital single.

From April 12 to July 19, the group held their fifth tour "BALLISTIK BOYZ LIVE TOUR 2024 "HIGHER EX".The kickoff song of the tour "HIGHER EX" once again produced and written by members Fukahori, Okuda, and Matsui was released as the groups 8th single. The single also featured 2 unit songs "good day good night" (Hidaka, Kanou, Fukahori, Sunada) and the self produced song "Mermaid" (Kainuma, Matsui, Okuda).

On October 16, They released the self produced song "7" as their fifth digital single, this served as a teaser for their Nippon Budokan concert, which had sold out in 1 minute and a pre release for their 9th single "Say it". On November 4th, the title track of the same name for "Say it" was released, with the single releasing on December 9th. On November 6, they held their special concert BALLISTIK BOYZ LIVE 2024 "BBZ EVOLUTION" .

=== 2025-present: Chapter 2, EP's, Arena Lives ===
On January 10, the group released the theme song "Get Wild" for the movie Salaryman Kintaro Akatsuki-hen digitally. On February 22, they held their first standalone overseas concert titled BALLISTIK BOYZ LIVE 2025 in TAIPEI.

On March 26, their first best album Chapter 1 was released. With this release, it concluded the group's "first chapter". On May 18, it was announced that the group would begin their "second chapter" by revealing a road map poster. In the poster, along with their upcoming live concerts, it was announced that the group would be releasing their first EP on August 13. It was also revealed that the group has transferred labels from rhythm zone to LDH Records.

The EP "Stardust Forever" had its promotional song of the same title pre-released digitally on June 13. The full EP with 4 songs was pre-released digitally on July 25. The song "CRASH" was used as the theme song for New Japan Pro-Wrestling's 35th edition of the G1 Climax tournament as well as the fighting song for TV Asahi's program World Pro Wrestling for the month of August and September. On June 21st and 22nd the group's first arena live "IMPACT" at World Memorial Hall took place.

From July 29th the groups 2nd terrestrial broadcast program BALLI BALLI! LET'S GO JAM! (バリバリ！バンドやろうぜ!) started airing. In which the group took on the challenge of forming a band with the goal of playing live shows within 4 months. The group held 10 live shows as the finale of the program in December 2025

On July 31st, the group started their sixth tour and first Asian tour BALLISTIK BOYZ LIVE TOUR 2025 "IMPACT" ~ASIA~, across 14 shows. A further 2 concerts took place at Toyota Arena Tokyo in November under the title "IMPACT" ～FINAL～. Also in November the song "Winter Glow" was released as their sixth digital single on December 28th, the group held the joint live concert "BALLISTIK BOYZ× PSYCHIC FEVER SPECIAL STAGE 2025 "THE FESTIVAL" ~Nenmatsu Daikanshasai~".

The groups show BALLI BALLI! LET'S GO JAM! was renewed for a second season in 2026, this time instead of documenting the journey of forming a bad, it was a series of interviews of the 7 members by fellow Exile Tribe member Komori Hayato. The program once again announced live shows as a band for November 2026, with 7 out of 9 shows selling out.

== Members ==
- Ryuta Hidaka (日髙竜太) - Vocalist, Performer
- Yoshiyuki Kanou (加納嘉将) - Vocalist, Performer
- Ryusei Kainuma (海沼流星) - Rapper, Performer
- Miku Fukahori (深堀未来) - Vocalist, Performer
- Rikiya Okuda (奥田力也) - Rapper, Performer
- Riki Matsui (松井利樹) - Rapper, Performer
- Masahiro Sunada (砂田将宏) - Vocalist, Performer

== Discography ==
=== Studio albums ===
Title	Details	Chart positions	Sales	
Title	Details	Oricon (JPN)	First week	Total
Ballistik Boyz	Released: May 22, 2019 (JPN); Label: Rhythm Zone; Formats: CD, CD/DVD, digital download	1	JPN: 26,386	JPN: 27,275
Pass the Mic	Released: November 24, 2021 (JPN); Label: Rhythm Zone; Formats: CD, CD/DVD, digital download	8	JPN: 9,967	
Back & Forth	Released: February 21, 2024 (JPN); Label: Rhythm Zone; Formats: CD, CD/DVD, digital download	4	JPN: 25,923	

=== Compilation albums ===
Title	Details	Chart positions	Sales
Title	Details	Oricon (JPN)	First week
Chapter 1	Released: March 26, 2025 (JPN); Label: Rhythm Zone; Formats: 2×CD, 2×CD/DVD, 2×CD/Blu-ray, digital download	15	JPN: 5,481

=== EPs ===
Title	Details	Chart positions	Sales
Title	Details	Oricon (JPN)	Sales
Stardust Forever	Released: August 13, 2025; Label: LDH; Formats: CD, digital download	4	JPN: 15,141
Beat	Released: April 29, 2026; Label: LDH; Formats: CD, digital download	3	JPN: 29,529
Blast	Released: September 16, 2026; Label: LDH; Formats: CD, digital download	2	JPN: 37,142

=== Singles ===
Title	Release date	Chart positions		Sales
Title	Release date	Oricon	Hot 100 (Note: Sources for chart positions are as follows: "44raiders", "Anti-Hero's", "Sum Baby", "Ding Ding Dong", "All I Ever Wanted", "Higher Ex", "Say It")	Sales
"44Raiders"	October 23, 2019	2	7	JPN: 50,351
"Anti-Hero’s" (アンタイ・ヒーローズ)	February 12, 2020	14	83	JPN: 5,456
"Animal"	February 3, 2021	10	57	JPN: 4,912
"Sum Baby"	August 4, 2021	3	18	JPN: 20,247
Ballistik Boyz from Exile ("Touch the Sky", "Fireworks", "The Next Door" and "Heads or Tails")	December 8, 2021	10	—	JPN: 9,906
"Ding Ding Dong"	May 31, 2023	3	7	JPN: 48,454
"All I Ever Wanted" (featuring Gulf Kanawut)	October 4, 2023	2	20	JPN: 30,270
"In My Head"	February 19, 2024	—	—	
"Higher Ex"	May 22, 2024	8	35	JPN: 23,814
"Say It"	December 4, 2024	4	5	JPN: 32,516
"Stardust Forever"	June 13, 2025	—	—	
"All of You"	July 25, 2025	—	—	
"Winter Glow"	November 14, 2025	—	—	
"All You Need Is Me"	April 29, 2026	—	—	
"Do Don Pa!"	September 16, 2026	—	—	

=== Participating works ===
Release date	Song	Artist	Single/Album
June 26, 2019	D.I till Infinity feat. Tomogen, Ballistik Boyz	Doberman Infinity	Doberman Infinity Best Album "5ive"
July 3, 2019	Dead or Alive	The Rampage Vs Ballistik Boyz	"Battle of Tokyo 〜Enter the Jr.Exile〜"
July 3, 2019	Shock the World	Fantastics Vs Ballistik Boyz	"Battle of Tokyo 〜Enter the Jr.Exile〜"
July 3, 2019	Break Down Ya Walls	Generations Vs Ballistik Boyz	"Battle of Tokyo 〜Enter the Jr.Exile〜"
July 3, 2019	24World	Generations, The Rampage, Fantastics and Ballistik Boyz	"Battle of Tokyo 〜Enter the Jr.Exile〜"
January 1, 2021	Way To The Glory	Exile Tribe	Rising Sun to the World
June 23, 2021	Viva La Evolucion	Jr.Exile	"Battle of Tokyo Time 4 Jr.Exile"
June 23, 2021	Untitled Future	Jr.Exile	"Battle of Tokyo Time 4 Jr.Exile"
April 27, 2022	Kinironobaton (金色のバトン)	Jr.Exile	Kinironobaton
December 28, 2022	We never die	Ballistik Boyz	High & Low The Worst Best Album
July 16th, 2024	Icy Fire	Ballistik Boyz Vs Lil Leauge	BATTLE OF TOKYO Jr.EXILE vs NEO EXILE

== Tours and concerts ==
=== Headlining tours ===
- BALLISTIK BOYZ LIVE TOUR 2020 "BBZ" (2020)
- BALLISTIK BOYZ PROLOGUE LIVE TOUR 2021 "PASS THE MIC" ~WAY TO THE GLORY~ (2021)
- BALLISTIK BOYZ LIVE TOUR 2021 "PASS THE MIC" ~WAY TO THE GLORY~ (2022)
- BALLISTIK BOYZ LIVE TOUR 2023 "N.E.X.T." (2023)
- BALLISTIK BOYZ LIVE TOUR 2024 "HIGHER EX" (2024)
- BALLISTIK BOYZ LIVE TOUR 2025 "IMPACT" ~ASIA~ (2025)
- BALLISTIK BOYZ LIVE TOUR 2026 "BEAT BLAST Z" (2026)

=== Headlining Concerts ===
- BALLISTIK BOYZ LIVE 2024 "BBZ EVOLUTION"
- BALLISTIK BOYZ LIVE 2025 in TAIPEI
- BALLISTIK BOYZ ARENA LIVE 2025 "IMPACT"
- BALLISTIK BOYZ LIVE 2026 BBZ IN TPE ~PERFECT YEAR~
- BALLISTIK BOYZ ARENA LIVE 2026 "BEAT BLAST Z" ~Our Place~

=== Tour Participation ===
- EXILE TRIBE LIVE TOUR 2021 "RISING SUN TO THE WORLD" (2021)
- THE SURVIVAL 2022 ~BALLISTIK BOYZ vs MA55IVE~ × PSYCHIC FEVER (2022)

=== Concert Participation ===
- Battle Of Tokyo 〜Enter The Jr.Exile〜 (2019)
- LDH Perfect Year 2020 Countdown Live 2019▶︎2020 "Rising" (2019)
- iCON Z 2022 ~Dreams For Children~ (2022)
- BATTLE OF TOKYO TIME 4 Jr.EXILE (2022)
- Jr.EXILE LIVE-EXPO 2022 (2022)
- BATTLE OF TOKYO CODE OF Jr.EXILE (2023)
- LDH LIVE-EXPO 2023 (2023)
- BATTLE OF TOKYO ~Jr.EXILE vs NEO EXILE~ (2024)
- LDH LIVE-EXPO 2024 -EXILE TRIBE BEST HITS- (2024)
- BALLISTIK BOYZ×PSYCHIC FEVER SPECIAL STAGE 2025 "THE FESTIVAL" ~Nenmatsu Daikanshasai~ (2025)
- BATTLE OF TOKYO ~RE:BIRTH~ (2026)
- HiGH&LOW 10th ANNIVERSARY FEVER (2026)
- LDH LIVE-EXPO 2026 -PERFECT YEAR BEST-

=== Livestreamed concerts ===
- LIVE×ONLINE IMAGINATION BALLISTIK BOYZ (September 20, 2020)
- LIVE×ONLINE BEYOND THE BORDER BALLISTIK BOYZ (December 23, 2020)
- LIVE×ONLINE INFINITY "HALLOWEEN" Trick or Treat!! R.F.B.Halloween Party!! (October 30, 2020)
- LIVE×ONLINE COUNTDOWN 2020▶2021"Rising Sun to the World" (December 31, 2020)

== Tie-ups ==
Song	Tie-Up	Tracklist
Tenhane -1000％- (テンハネ -1000％-)	Fuji TV drama "The King Of Novels" Theme song	Album "BALLISTIK BOYZ"
Tenhane -1000％- (テンハネ -1000％-)	TV Tokyo "Japan Countdown" May's opening theme	Album "BALLISTIK BOYZ"
Tenhane -1000％- (テンハネ -1000％-)	Music On! TV "Zoom Up!" ending theme	Album "BALLISTIK BOYZ"
PASION	Fuji TV drama "The King Of Novels" Ending song	Album "BALLISTIK BOYZ"
Make U a believer	TV Asahi "Freestyle Dungeon" ending song	Album "BALLISTIK BOYZ"

== Filmography ==
=== Television shows ===
Year	Title	Network
2018 – 2021	Weekly Exile (週刊EXILE)	TBS
2024	BALLI BALLI! BALLISTIK BOYZ	NTV, Hulu
2025 – 2026	BALLI BALLI! LET'S GO JAM! (バリバリ！バンドやろうぜ！)	NTV, Hulu

== Awards ==
Year	Ceremony	Award	Nominee/Work	Result
2019	MTV VMAJ 2019	Rising Star Award	—	Won
