= Hayato Komori =

Japanese dancer and actor (born 1995)

- 小森 隼
- Born: 13 June 1995 (age 31); Mie Prefecture,Japan
- Education: Hinode High School
- Occupation: Dancer
- Years active: 2011–present
- Height: 176.5 cm (5 ft 9.5 in)
- Musical career
- Genres: J-pop, Dance
- Labels: LDH, Rhythm Zone
- Website: www.ldh.co.jp/eng/management/komori//

Hayato Komori (小森隼 Komori Hayato; born 13 June 1995) is a Japanese dancer and actor. He is one of the performers of the Japanese all-male dance and music group Generations from Exile Tribe.

Hayato is represented with LDH.

== Career ==
Hayato Komori was born on June 13, 1995, in Mie Prefecture, Japan. He is half Korean.

Hayato entered Tokyo's EXPG when he was in elementary school.

In April 2011, he was selected as a candidate of Generations through an audition held in EXPG and in April 2012 he became an official member.

In March 2014, he graduated from Hinode High school, which Alan Shirahama of the same group was his senior in. In the same month, he participated in Exile Performer Battle Audition and made it to the finals but wasn’t selected to join EXILE.

In October 2019, he made his acting debut with the movie "High & Low The Worst".

Hayato is an all-round dancer and the first Japanese member to join the dance crew of Chicago Footwork.

== Filmography ==
=== Movies ===
Year	Title	Role	Ref.
2019	High & Low The Worst	Masaya Orochi	
2023	Sana	Himself	

=== TV dramas ===
Year	Title	Network	Notes
2016	Night Hero NAOTO	TV Tokyo	Episode 1 (Ending Dance)

=== TV shows ===
Year	Title	Network	Ref.
2007	"Mecha-Mecha Iketeru! 2H Special!!"	Fuji TV	
2007	"Ponkikki!"	Fuji TV	
2019	E Dance Academy season 7	NHK ETV	

=== Internet programs ===
Year	Title	Role	Network	Notes	Ref.
2019	Renai Drama na Koi ga Shitai season 3	MC	Abema TV	From May 11 to July	
2019	Renai Drama na Koi ga Shitai 〜Kiss to survive〜	MC	Abema TV	From August to October	

=== Radio ===
Year	Title	Network	Notes	Ref.
2018	YonPachi-48hours	TOKYO FM	Assistant	
2018 - 2019	AWESOME RADIO SHOW	TOKYO FM	Host	
2019 - present	Suzuki Osamu to Komori Hayato no Soudan Friday	TOKYO FM	Host	
2019 - present	Generations' Komori Hayato's Good Laugh and Sleep	Nippon Broadcasting System	Host	

=== Advertisements ===
Year	Title	Ref.
2007	McDonald's "Happy Set"	
2007	Acecook "Super Cup"	
2017	Tokyo Nishikawa "Afit"	
2018	"Youfuku no Aoyama" AOYAMA PRESTIGE TECHNOLOGY"	
2018	Tokyo Nishikawa "Afit" (Season movie " Winter")	

=== Music videos ===
Year	Artist	Title
2006	Shunsuke Kiyokiba	Ningen Jaroga!
2008	EXILE	Choo Choo TRAIN
2008	EXILE	Gingatetsudou 999
2010	Love	Kataomoi

=== Live ===
Year	Artist	Title	Notes
2006–2007	EXILE	Rhythm Nation EXILE	As a dancer
2007	EXILE	EXILE LIVE TOUR 2007 EXILE EVOLUTION	As a dancer
2007	Neverland	Neverland One-man Live	As a dancer
2008	EXILE	EXILE LIVE TOUR "EXILE PERFECT LIVE 2008"	As a dancer
2010	EXILE	EXILE LIVE TOUR 2010 FANTASY	As a dancer

== Series ==
Date	Series	Website	Ref.
May 2018 - present	Komori no Kogoto (小森の 小言)	TOKYO HEADLINE	
