= Doberman Infinity =

Japanese hip-hop group

- Also known as: Doberman Inc (2000–2014), D.I
- Genres: J-pop, Hip-hop
- Years active: 2000–present
- Labels: Victor Entertainment (2004-2007); Rhythm Republic (2007-2009); Toy's Factory (2014-2017); LDH Music (2017-present)
- Members: KUBO-C; GS; P-CHO; Sway; Kazuki
- Past members: MAB; Tomogen
- Website: dobermaninfinity-ldh.jp

Doberman Infinity Stylized as DOBERMAN INFINITY (also known as D.I) is a Japanese hip-hop group managed by LDH Japan and signed to the record label LDH Music.

== History ==
=== Doberman Inc: 2000–2014 ===
In 2000, three members of "West Head", KUBO-C, GS, and P-CHO, formed "Doberman Inc" with Tomogen and MAB through track maker Bachlogic. In 2002, the group started as an independent group with the album "Dobermann".

In 2004, the group signed to the major label Victor Entertainment, and made their major debut with the mini-album "Conversation Piece". In 2006, MAB withdrew, the group continued their activities with four members.

In 2008, the group became affiliated with LDH and started being managed by the company. On 17 October 2013, Tomogen left the group.

=== Doberman Infinity: 2014–present ===
On 17 June 2014, it was announced that Kazuki who was a finalist in "Vocal Battle Audition 4" would be joining the group which would be renamed to "Doberman Infinity". A week later, on 24 June, the group announced the addition of Sway and the comeback of the group. The group also moved label to Toy's Factory.

In 2017, the group moved label to LDH's own record label LDH Music.

== Members ==
=== Present members ===
Name	Native name	Position	Date of birth	Birthplace
KUBO-C	Takashi Kubo (久保貴史)	MC, Leader	January 21, 1980 (age 46)	Nara Prefecture
GS	Takashi Mutō (武藤隆志)	MC	June 12, 1979 (age 47)	Nara Prefecture
P-CHO	Yūji Nagano (長野祐仁)	MC	May 2, 1980 (age 46)	Nara Prefecture
Sway	Shuhei Nogae (野替愁平)	MC	June 9, 1986 (age 40)	Sapporo, Hokkaido
Kazuki	Kazuki Hayashi (林和希)	Vocalist	June 13, 1991 (age 35)	Gifu Prefecture

=== Past members ===
Name	Native name	Date of birth	Birthplace
MAB	Tomofumi Mabuchi (馬渕智史)	December 3, 1980 (age 45)	Shiga Prefecture
Tomogen	Tomonori Murakami (村上智則)	June 3, 1980 (age 46)	Amagasaki, Hyogo

== Discography ==
=== Albums ===
==== Studio albums ====
	Information	Chart positions
	Information	Oricon
1st	The Line: Released: 2 December 2015 (JPN); Label: Toy's Factory; Formats: CD, CD/DVD, digital download	5
2nd	Terminal: Release: 16 November 2016 (JPN); Label: Toy's Factory; Formats: CD, CD/DVD, digital download	7
3rd	Off Road: Release: 18 April 2018 (JPN); Label: LDH Music; Formats: CD, CD/DVD, digital download	7
4th	Lost + Found: Release: 6 July 2022 (JPN); Label: LDH Music; Formats: CD, CD/DVD, digital download	19
5th	D.X: Release: 15 January 2025 (JPN); Label: LDH Music; Formats: CD, digital download	5

==== Mini-albums ====
	Information	Chart positions
	Information	Oricon
1st	#PRLG: Release: 19 November 2014 (JPN); Label: Toy's Factory; Formats: CD, CD/DVD, digital download	8
2nd	#Play: Release: 14 June 2017 (JPN); Label: LDH Music; Formats: CD, CD/DVD, digital download	4
3rd	Present: Release: 8 July 2026 (JPN); Label: LDH Music; Formats: CD, CD/Blu-ray, digital download	23

==== Compilation albums ====
	Information	Chart positions	Sales
	Information	Oricon	Sales
1st	5IVE: Release: 26 June 2019 (JPN); Label: LDH Music; Formats: CD, CD/DVD, digital download	8	JPN: 16,631

=== Singles ===
==== As lead artists ====
List of singles, with selected chart positions
Year	Title	Release date	Chart positions		Album
Year	Title	Release date	JPN Oricon	JPN Hot 100 (Note: Sources for chart positions are as follows: "Say Yeah!!", "Jump Around ∞", "Itsuka"", "GA GA SUMMER", "Do Party", "Ano Hi no Kimi to Ima no Boku ni", "Super Ball" , "You & I", "We are the one",)	Album
2015	Say Yeah!!	15 July	3	19	The Line
2015	Jump Around ∞	7 October	4	15	The Line
2016	Itsuka (いつか)	13 April	2	18	Terminal
2016	GA GA SUMMER/D.Island feat. m-flo	27 July	7	10	Terminal
2017	Do Party	10 May	4	7	Off Road
2017	Ano Hi no Kimi to Ima no Boku ni (あの日のキミと今の僕に)	22 November	11	6	Off Road
2018	Super Ball	15 August	4	19	5IVE
2018	You & I	26 September	7	14	5IVE
2019	We are the one/Zutto (ずっと)	27 November	7	46	

==== As featured artists ====
Year	Release date	Title	Artist
2017	13 September	Shatter	Doberman Infinity×AK-69

==== Digital Singles ====
Year	Release date	Title	Billboard Japan Hot 100
2014	27 August	Infinity	79
2015	27 February	Tomorrow Never Dies	

=== Participating works ===
Year	Release date	Title	Artist	Album
2014	27 August	24World	Exile Tribe	Exile Tribe Revolution
2014	27 August	Won't Be Long	Exile Tribe	Exile Tribe Revolution
2014	22 October	Loveholic (Exile Shokichi feat.Doberman Infinity)	Exile Shokichi	The One (single)
2014	29 October	First Christmas	Exile Atsushi	Precious Love (single)
2016	15 June	Do or Die	Doberman Infinity	High & Low Original Best Album
2016	15 June	Voice Of Red feat. GS	DJ Daruma from PKCZ	High & Low Original Best Album
2016	15 June	Hell On Earth	KUBO-C, P-CHO & Jay'ed	High & Low Original Best Album
2017	1 February	Premium Tequila feat. Doberman Infinity	Dance Earth Party	I
2017	21 June	Takers feat. Doberman Infinity	Jay'ed	Here I Stand
2017	2 August	Unity feat. Doberman Infinity	PKCZ	360° ChamberZ
2018	11 July	Red Soul Blue Dragon	Red Diamond Dogs feat. Doberman Infinity, Jay'ed, Mabu	Red Soul Blue Dragon (single)
2019	6 March	Konnichiwa What's Up! Remix feat. Doberman Infinity	SudannaYuzuYully	SYY

=== Video albums ===
List of media, with selected chart positions
Title	Video details	Peak chart positions	
Title	Video details	JPN DVD	JPN BD
DOBERMAN INFINITY 3rd Anniversary Special Concert "iii -three-"	Released: 4 October 2017; Label: LDH Music; Formats: DVD · Blu-ray	6	18
DOBERMAN INFINITY 2018 DOGG YEAR -FULL THROTTLE- in Nippon Budokan	Released: 27 March 2019; Label: LDH Music; Formats: DVD · Blu-ray	3	32
DOBERMAN INFINITY LIVE TOUR 2019 5IVE ~Kanarazu Aou Kono Yakusoku no Basho de~	Released: April 1 2020; Label: LDH Music; Formats: DVD, Blu-ray	TBA	TBA

== Live ==
=== Tours ===
Year	Period	Title
2016	from March 15 to April 17	DOBERMAN INFINITY LIVE TOUR 2016 "THE LINE"
2017	from February 11 to April 6	DOBERMAN INFINITY LIVE TOUR 2017 "TERMINAL"
2018	from May 26 to October 16	DOBERMAN INFINITY LIVE TOUR 2018 DOGG YEAR ~PARTY ON THE OFF ROAD~
2019	from November 16 to November 27	DOBERMAN INFINITY LIVE TOUR 2019 5IVE ~Kanarazu Aou Kono Yakusoku no Basho de~
2020	from March 7 to December 26	DOBERMAN INFINITY LIVE TOUR 2020 We are the one
2020	from March 28 to July 12	DOBERMAN INFINITY LIVE TOUR 2020 We are the one ~PERFECT YEAH!!~

=== Concerts ===
Date	Title
February 11 - 27, 2015	DOBERMAN INFINITY LIVE "#PRLG"
May 13 - 14, 2017	DOBERMAN INFINITY 3 Shuunen Tokubetsu Kinen Kouen "iii -three-"
November 12, 2018	DOBERMAN INFINITY 2018 DOGG YEAR ~FULL THROTTLE~ in Nippon Budokan

== Tie-up ==
Song title	Tie-up
Infinity	KTV / FujiTV Drama Great Teacher Onizuka season 2 insert song
99	J Sports "High School Basketball Winter Cup 2014" program theme song
Tomorrow Never Dies	Gekidan Exile Stage play "Tomorrow Never Dies -yattekonai ashita wanai-" theme song
Heartbeat	NTV "World Premium Boxing" image song
Jump Around ∞	Kansai Collection 2015 A/W Official theme song
Jump Around ∞	NTV "High & Low -The Story Of S.W.O.R.D.- interlude song
Do or Die	NTV "High & Low -The Story Of S.W.O.R.D.- interlude song
to YOU	"35th Sapporo White Illumination" collaboration song
So White So Bright	"Love Snow Hokkaido 2015-16" tie-up song
On Way Home	TV Asahi "Onegai! Ranking" November 2015 ending song
Off Road	bayfm April 2018 late power play
Lookin' for	Marianas Visitors Authority "3 consecutive holidays are Mariana." Image Song
The Name	Hokkaido Nippon Ham Fighters Nishikawa Haruka entry song
Harukaze (春風)	Fuji TV drama "Kiss Shitai Matsuge" Insert song
Super Ball	Nagashima Spa Land "Nagashima Jumbo sea Water Pool" 2018 CM song
Never Change	Drama "Love or Not 2" Theme song
Thrill Life (スリルライフ)	Nagashima Spa Land Hybrid Coaster "White Whale" CM Song
Manatsu no masumatikku (真夏のマスマティック)	Nagashima Spa Land "Jumbo Sea Water Pool" 2019 CM Song
5IVE	"KNIVES OUT" × "BIGO LIVE JAPAN" Collaboration Event Official Support Song
ON WAY HOME	Headline West "JAPAN MOVE UP WEST" CM song
Mada Tarinee (まだ足りねぇ)	Movie "High & Low The Worst" interlude song
ASTRO BOY ~GO!GO! Atom~	TV Tokyo's anime "Go! Go! Atom" Opening song

== Filmography ==
=== Radio ===
Year	Title	Network	Notes
2015	We All Can Be Connected	Bayfm	October 2015 – present

=== Music videos ===
Year	Title	Artist
2016	YEAH!! YEAH!! YEAH!!	Exile The Second

== Producing ==
=== Artists ===
- Ballistik Boyz from Exile Tribe (Co-produced with Exile Hiro)

== Photobook ==
	Year	Release date	Title	Ref.
1st	2018	22 December	Doberman Infinity DOGG Year 2018 Memorial Photobook	

== Doberman Inc's Discography ==
=== Albums ===
==== Studio albums ====
	Release date	Title
1st	25 June 2002	DOBERMANN
2nd	15 April 2003	MEGA CITY FIVE
3rd	23 June 2004	FIVE STAR LINERS
4th	21 September 2006	STOP, LOOK, LISTEN
5th	26 April 2008	ZERO
6th	9 November 2011	ONE ～Oretachi wa hitotsu～ (ONE ～俺たちは1つ～)

==== Mini-albums ====
	Release date	Title
1st	4 June 2003	The Bootleg E.P.
2nd	21 April 2004	CONVERSATION PIECE
3rd	14 July 2010	NEVER LOSE YOURSELF

==== Best albums ====
	Release date	Title
1st	29 August 2007	THE BEST ～ TIME 4 SOME ACTION

=== Singles ===
	Release date	Title
1st	16 September 2009	GENERATION/FIREWORKS type D.I

=== Digital Singles ===
	Release date	Title
1st	2 March 2011	Makenna (負けんな)
