= Fantastics from Exile Tribe =

Japanese male dance and vocal group

- Also known as: Fantastics; Fanta
- Origin: Japan
- Genres: J-pop, dance-pop
- Years active: 2016–present
- Labels: LDH, Rhythm Zone
- Spinoff of: Exile, Exile Tribe
- Members: Sekai; Taiki Sato; Natsuki Sawamoto; Leiya Seguchi; Natsuki Hori; Keito Kimura; Yusei Yagi; Sota Nakajima
- Past members: Shota Nakao
- Website: fantastics-ldh.jp

Fantastics from Exile Tribe (Japanese: ファンタスティックス・フロム・エグザイル・トライブ, stylized as FANTASTICS from EXILE TRIBE and formerly known as Fantastics) is a nine-member Japanese male dance and vocal group formed and managed by LDH. The group is part of the collective Exile Tribe, related to Exile, and signed to the record label Rhythm Zone from the Avex Group. Fantastics debuted on December 5, 2018.

== History ==
=== 2016: Formation ===
On December 29, Sekai, Sato Taiki and five performers from EXPG were selected to form a new dance group.

=== 2017: Pre-debut ===
On January 31, the group's name and formation was announced in TBS TV show "Weekly Exile" (週間EXILE) consisting of 5 performers coming from EXPG and 2 Exile members Sekai and Taiki being the leaders of the unit. The 5 new performers also originated from the dance team Exile Generations and included: Natsuki Sawamoto, Leiya Seguchi, Natsuki Hori, Keito Kimura and Shota Nakao.

From February 13 until April 16 the group started their Musha shugyō. On May 15, the Vocal Battle Audition 5 was announced on "Weekly Exile" (週間EXILE) in order to recruit vocalists for the new unit. On December 20, Yusei Yagi and Sota Nakajima were announced as the two finalist who passed the audition on NTV's "Sukkiri".

=== 2018: Fantastic 9 ===
On March 3, Shota Nakao announced that he would be suspending his activities due to stomach cancer to receive treatment. From April 14 to June 10, the group launched their second Musha shugyō, entitled "Yume-sha shugyō FANTASTIC 9". On May 1, it was announced that Ballistik Boyz would be the opening act of the events starting from May 12.

On May 4, the group featured on Exile's digital single "Turn Back Time", which was dedicated to Shota and the group's first release. The music video for this song included hand-written messages and get-well wishes from every Exile Tribe artist for Shota.

On July 8, it was announced that Shota had died of gastric cancer on July 6.

On July 14, at Dance Earth Festival 2018, which was the group's first stage since Shota's death announcement, the members announced that "FANTASTICS is 9 people.". Shortly after, LDH announced a memorial event dedicated to Shota for fans. The event was held on August 25 and 26, with fans bringing letters, pictures and art to share the memories they have of him.

On September 15, during Exile's concert Exile Live Tour 2018-2019 "Star of Wish", they were announced as an official Exile Tribe group with the announcement of their major debut on December 5 with the single "Over Drive".

=== 2019: Singles, Battle of Tokyo and first tour ===
On April 3, the group released their 2nd single "Flying Fish". After finishing promotions for their second release, LDH's multimedia project Battle of Tokyo, which includes all Jr.Exile groups, started in June. During this month those 4 groups released collaboration singles every week, until they released a full album titled Battle of Tokyo: Enter The Jr.Exile on July 3, 2019. Accompanying the album release, the groups held a row of live performances from July 4 to 7 with the same name. Since those dates included the first anniversary of Shota's death, a memorial for him was built at the concert venue. On July 6, the groups also performed "Turn Back Time" together in honor of Shota.

On August 9, the group announced they will hold their first national hall tour combining "Sound" and "Drama" titled "Fantastics Sound Drama 2019 Fantastic Nine" beginning on October 11 and ending on November 21.

On August 21, the group released their 3rd single "Dear Destiny", which is their first ballad as a title track.

On October 9, it was announced that they would release their 4th single "Time Camera" on December 4. The title track will be an upbeat song in contrast to their previous single.

On November 21, the last day of their first tour, it was announced that Fantastics would release their first full album titled Fantastic 9 on February 12, 2020, and their first photobook (focusing on the photos of their 1st hall tour) in spring of 2020. Additionally, it was revealed that the group would go on their second tour and first arena tour titled Fantastics LiveTour 2020 "FNT" in 2020 too. The tour would be part of LDH Perfect Year 2020: Season 2 "Imagination".

On December 8, it was revealed that Fantastics and The Rampage would be in charge of the special movie theme songs for the 40th anniversary project of Mobile Suit Gundam titled Gundam × Ken Okuyama Design × LDH Japan “G40 Project”. Fantastics' theme song "To The Sky" and The Rampage's theme song "Show You The Way" would both reflect the story of Mobile Suit Gundam from two different aspects. The full special movie project was released on Gundam's official YouTube channel on January 1, 2020.

=== 2020: First studio album Fantastic 9 and Live×Online ===
Shortly after the release of their first full album Fantastic 9 on February 12, 2020, it was announced that the group would release their 5th single "Hey, darlin’" on April 1.

On April 15, the group released their first group photobook Fantastics Nine which includes photos from their first tour Fantastics Sound Drama 2019 Fantastic Nine.

Fantastics's second tour Fantastics Live Tour 2020 "FNT" was scheduled from March 28 to July 19, but due to COVID-19 pandemic, all performances were cancelled. In compensation, Fantastics held a series of livestreamed concerts on the Japanese streaming platform AbemaTV from July to December. Live×Online "Fantastics" was held on July 2. Live×Online Imagination "Fantastics" was held on September 24. On October 30, they participated on Live×Online Infinity "Trick or Treat!! R.F.B. Halloween Party!!", and finally Live×Online Beyond The Border Toshi Wasure Night Fever on December 26.

On July 25, Fantastics announced their 6th single "Winding Road (Mirai e)" to be released on September 23. Not long after the release, the group announced their upcoming 7th single titled "High Fever" which would serve as the theme song of the group's first leading TV drama "Mannequin Night Fever", the single was released on November 11.

On December 31, the group took part in the livestreamed concert of LDH artists, Live×Online Countdown 2020▶2021"Rising Sun to the World".

=== 2021: Fantastic Voyage ===
From March 10 to June 28, the group took part in the dome tour of Exile Tribe: Exile Tribe Live Tour 2021 "Rising Sun to the World". The tour was LDH's first live tour with presential audience since the cancellation of all concerts in February 2020 due to the COVID-19 pandemic.

The second live tour Fantastics Prologue Live Tour 2021 "Fantastic Voyage": Way to the Glory took place from March 19 to June 21, 2021.

On March 17, the group released the song "Play Back" digitally which served as theme song for the group's TV show FUN! FUN! FANTASTICS. From April 10 to May 5, all members except for Sekai and Sato Taiki held the live stage BACK TO THE MEMORIES which is linked to their previous TV show, for this occasion they formed the special unit Fantastic6.

On April 18, an album by Jr.Exile for the Battle of Tokyo project titled "Battle of Tokyo Time 4 Jr.Exile" was announced to be released on June 23, the songs by the individual groups and the collaboration song of Generations & The Rampage were pre-released digitally from April 19 to June 21, the music videos were released in a hybrid live-action/animated form, with this latter featuring the four groups' avatars. Moreover, the DVD Version included the concert video of "Battle Of Tokyo ~Enter The Jr.Exile~" held in Makuhari Messe in July 2019.

On May 19, the group released their 8th single "Stop for Nothing".

On August 18, the group released their second album Fantastic Voyage, which includes all their songs starting from 2020 plus three songs which were pre-released digitally ahead of the album's release: "DiVE" on July 5, "Summer drops" on July 12, and the album's promotional track "Drive Me Crazy" on July 26 in which Alan Shirahama collaborated in its production.

The third live tour Fantastics Live Tour 2021 "Fantastic Voyage": Way to the Glory is a continuation of the previous tour, scheduled from October 28 to February 13, 2022. It was extended to February 22, 2022 with the announcement of 8 additional concerts on November 8, 2021 and 2 additional final concerts at Tokyo Garden Theater being named Fantastics Live Tour 2021 "Fantastic Voyage": Way to the Glory The Final on January 17, 2022.

On December 15, the group released the tribute single "Fantastics from Exile" as a part of Exile's 20th anniversary celebration project "Exile Tribute", the single is the third of the four consecutive tribute singles releases by Jr.Exile groups.

=== 2022: "Santa Monica Lollipop" ===
On March 9, Fantastics released their 9th single and first of the year titled "Santa Monica Lollipop", the title song was used as the theme for the 2nd season of the group's variety show "Fun! Fun! Fantastics". In addition, the B-side songs include "Tie and Tie" which is the ending song of the anime "Rusted Armors -Dawn-" and "Turn to You" which is the ending song for the drama "Liar" starring fellow member Taiki Sato.

From April 1 to May 1, "Fantastic6" performed in the live stage Back to the Memories Part 2.

The new crown program Furusato Fanta is the first jointly funded format program by Fuji TV and FNS in the history of Fuji TV, which is broadcast from April 1. A Fake Documentary "The Usual Night" is aired on ABC TV from May 2.

On May 25, the group released the live album Fantastics Live Tour 2021 "Fantastic Voyage" ~Way To The Glory~ Live CD.

Fantastics Live Tour 2022 "Fan Fan Hop" to be held from June 8 to August 7.

On June 29, they released their 10th single "Escape", the title song is the ending theme song of TV Tokyo's drama Hanayome Miman Escape.

In 2024, they performed a theme song called "Got Boost?", an opening of Kamen Rider Gavv.

== Members ==
=== Current ===
- Sekai (世界)
- Taiki Sato (佐藤大樹)
- Natsuki Sawamoto (澤本夏輝)
- Leiya Seguchi (瀬口黎弥)
- Natsuki Hori (堀夏喜)
- Keito Kimura (木村慧人)
- Yusei Yagi (八木勇征)
- Sota Nakajima (中島颯太)

=== Former ===
- Shota Nakao (中尾翔太)

== Discography ==
=== Studio albums ===
Title	Details	Chart positions
Title	Details	Oricon Albums Chart
Fantastic 9	Released: February 12, 2020 (JPN); Label: Rhythm Zone; Formats: CD, CD/DVD, CD/Blu-ray, digital download	4
Fantastic Voyage	Released: August 18, 2021 (JPN); Label: Rhythm Zone; Formats: CD, CD/DVD, CD/Blu-ray, digital download	8
Fantastic Rocket	Released: December 5, 2023; Label: Rhythm Zone; Formats: CD, CD/DVD, CD/Blu-ray, digital download	2

=== Compilation albums ===
Title	Details	Chart positions
Title	Details	Oricon Albums Chart
Welcome to Sunshine	Released: February 12, 2026 (JPN); Label: Rhythm Zone; Formats: CD, CD/DVD, CD/Blu-ray, digital download	3
Back to the Memories: The Best	Released: September 23, 2026 (JPN); Label: Rhythm Zone; Formats: CD, digital download	4

=== Extended plays ===
Title	Details	Chart positions
Title	Details	Oricon Albums Chart
Temporal Transition	Released: July 17, 2024 (JPN); Label: Rhythm Zone; Formats: CD, CD/DVD, CD/Blu-ray, digital download	4
Dimensional Bridge	Released: February 2, 2025 (JPN); Label: Rhythm Zone; Formats: CD, CD/DVD, digital download	2
Cosmic Resonance	Released: July 16, 2025 (JPN); Label: Rhythm Zone; Formats: CD, CD/DVD, CD/Blu-ray, digital download	3

=== Singles ===
List of singles, with selected chart positions
Title	Year	Chart positions		Sales	Certifications	Album
Title	Year	JPN Oricon	JPN Hot 100 (Note: Sources for chart positions are as follows: "Over Drive", "Flying Fish", "Dear Destiny", "Time Camera", "Winding Road", "Stop for Nothing", "Santa Monica Lollipop", "Escape", "Summer Bike", "Choo Choo Train", "Panorama Jet", "Tell Me", "Got Boost?", "BFX", "Zutto Zutto", "Sunflower",)	Sales	Certifications	Album
"Over Drive"	2018	3	3		RIAJ (physical): Gold	Fantastic 9
"Flying Fish"	2019	2	5			Fantastic 9
"Dear Destiny"	2019	2	5			Fantastic 9
"Time Camera"	2019	2	4			Fantastic 9
"Hey, Darlin'"	2020	11	—			Fantastic Voyage
"Winding Road (Mirai e)" (Winding Road ～未来へ～)	2020	5	57			Fantastic Voyage
"High Fever"	2020	7	81			Fantastic Voyage
"Stop for Nothing"	2021	2	30			Fantastic Voyage
"Fantastics from Exile"	2021	—	—			Non-album single
"Santa Monica Lollipop"	2022	3	15			Fantastic Rocket
"Escape"	2022	3	35			Fantastic Rocket
"Summer Bike"	2022	4	19			Fantastic Rocket
"Choo Choo Train"	2022	6	33			Fantastic Rocket
"Panorama Jet"	2023	2	5			Fantastic Rocket
"Tell Me"	2023	2	11			Fantastic Rocket
"Got Boost?"	2024	4	7	JPN: 6,315 (dig.)		Non-album single
"Yellow Yellow"	2024	—	—			Non-album single
"Top of the Game"	2025	—	—			Dimensional Bridge
"Candy Blaze"	2025	—	—			Cosmic Resonance
"BFX"	2025	4	17	JPN: 25,673 (phy.)		Non-album singles
"Zutto Zutto" (ずっとずっと)	2025	5	44	JPN: 17,024 (phy.)		Non-album singles
"Finale"	2026	—	—			Welcome to Sunshine
"Sunflower"	2026	3	20	JPN: 23,148 (phy.)		Non-album single
"—" denotes releases that did not chart or were not released in that region.

=== Participating works ===
Year	Release date	Title	Artist	Album
2018	May 4	Turn Back Time feat. FANTASTICS	Exile	Star of Wish
2019	July 3	Supersonic	Generations Vs Fantastics	"Battle Of Tokyo 〜Enter The Jr.Exile〜"
2019	July 3	Shock The World	Fantastics Vs Ballistik Boyz	"Battle Of Tokyo 〜Enter The Jr.Exile〜"
2019	July 3	Mix It Up	The Rampage Vs Fantastics	"Battle Of Tokyo 〜Enter The Jr.Exile〜"

== Tie-up ==
Song	Tie-Up	Ref	Tracklist
"Over Drive"	NTV's "Sukkiri" December 2018 theme song		Over Drive
"Believe in Love"	Movie "Shigatsu no kimi, Spica" theme song		Flying Fish
"Believe in Love"	FM OH! "OH! MY MORNING 851" OH! MY OH Tenki February, 2019 image song		Flying Fish
"Tie and Tie"	Stage "Rusted Armors" theme song		
”Turn to You”	Ending theme song of drama "Liar"		
”Escape”	Ending theme of TV Tokyo's drama “Hanayome Miman Escape”		
"Every moment"	ABA's ending song of the telecast of the 101st National High School Baseball Championship in Aomori		Dear Destiny
"Every moment"	HAB's cheering song for summer 2019 's National High school baseball championship		Dear Destiny
"Every moment"	NCC (Nagasaki Culture Telecasting) "101st National High School Baseball Championship Nagasaki Tournament" theme song		Dear Destiny
"Every moment"	OAB "101st National High School Baseball Championship Oita Tournament" Background music / ending theme song		Dear Destiny
"Every moment"	2019 IAT "High school baseball Summer tournament of Iwate" theme song		Dear Destiny
"Every moment"	2019 KFB "summer high school baseball" theme song		Dear Destiny
"Every moment"	abn "2019 high school baseball" theme song		Dear Destiny
"Every moment"	eat "101st National High School Baseball Championship Ehime Meet White Ball Youth 2019" ending song		Dear Destiny
"Every moment"	yab (Yamaguchi Asahi Broadcasting) "Kirari summer 2019 national high school baseball championship Yamaguchi tournament" opening song		Dear Destiny
"Every moment"	2019 KBC "High school baseball" image song		Dear Destiny
"Got Boost?"	2024 "Kamen Rider Gavv" opening song		

== Live ==
=== As a lead artists ===
Year	Period	Title
2019	From October 11 to November 21	FANTASTICS SOUND DRAMA 2019 FANTASTIC NINE
2020	From March 28 to July 19	FANTASTICS LIVE TOUR 2020 "FNT"
2021	From March 19 to June 21	FANTASTICS PROLOGUE LIVE TOUR 2021 "FANTASTIC VOYAGE" ~WAY TO THE GLORY~
2021-2022	From October 28 to February 22	FANTASTICS LIVE TOUR 2021 "FANTASTIC VOYAGE" ~WAY TO THE GLORY~
2022	From June 8 to August 7	FANTASTICS LIVE TOUR 2022 "FAN FAN HOP"

=== As a participating group ===
Year	Period	Title	Group
2019	From July 4 to July 7	Battle Of Tokyo 〜Enter The Jr.Exile〜	Generations, The Rampage, Fantastics, Ballistik Boyz from Exile Tribe
2021	From March 10 to June 28	EXILE TRIBE LIVE TOUR 2021 "RISING SUN TO THE WORLD"	Exile (Japanese band), Sandaime J Soul Brothers, Generations, The Rampage, Fantastics, Ballistik Boyz from Exile Tribe

=== As a support act ===
Year	Period	Title	Group
2017	May	GENERATIONS from EXILE TRIBE WORLD TOUR 2017 ～SPEEDSTER～	Generations from Exile Tribe
2017	From July to December	GENERATIONS LIVE TOUR 2017 "MAD CYCLONE"	Generations from Exile Tribe
2018-2019	From September to February	EXILE LIVE TOUR 2018-2019 "STAR OF WISH"	EXILE

== Filmography ==
=== TV shows ===
Year	Title	Network
2017–present	Weekly Exile (週間EXILE)	TBS
2021	FUN! FUN! FANTASTICS	NTV
2022	FUN! FUN! FANTASTICS Season 2	NTV
2022	Furusato Fanta	Fuji TV
2022	The Usual Night	ABC TV

=== Dramas ===
Year	Title	Network
2020	Mannequin Night Fever	NTV

=== Radio ===
Period	Title	Network	Ref.
November 2018 – Present	〜Minna de Tsukuru Radio〜 "Fantastic Radio" (〜みんなでつくるラジオ〜「FANTASTIC RADIO」)	FM OH!	

=== Music videos ===
Year	Title	Artist
2018	Y.M.C.A	Generations from Exile Tribe

== Awards ==
Year	Ceremony	Award	Nominee/Work	Result
2019	The 33rd Japan Gold Disc Award	Best 5 New Artists (Japanese)	—	Won
