= Big City Rodeo =

- CD only artwork.

Single by Generations from Exile Tribe

from the album Best Generations
- Released: October 25, 2017
- Recorded: 2017
- Genre: Electro house
- Length: 4:55
- Label: Rhythm Zone
- Songwriter: Amon Hayashi
- Producers: Exile Hiro; T.Kura; G.Sky

Generations from Exile Tribe singles chronology
"Taiyou mo Tsuki mo" (2017)	"Big City Rodeo" (2017)	"F.L.Y. BOYS F.L.Y. GIRLS" (2018)

"Big City Rodeo" (stylized as "BIG CITY RODEO") is a song by Japanese boy band Generations from Exile Tribe, taken from their first greatest hits compilation Best Generations (2018). It was released by Rhythm Zone on two physical formats, and for digital consumption. The track was written by Amon Hayashi, composed by musicians Jay'ed and T.Kura, and produced by Exile Hiro T.Kura and G.Sky . Recording of the song was held at Prime Sound Studios in Shibuya, Tokyo, and was mixed by D.O.I. at Daimonion Recordings. Musically, "Big City Rodeo" is a dance number that is heavily influenced by electro house music, and lyrically focuses on a high lifestyle and luxury.

"Big City Rodeo" premiered as the album's lead and only single on October 25, 2017, featuring two B-side songs: "Mad Cyclone" and the English version of their previous single "Taiyou mo Tsuki mo". The single received positive reviews from music critics, who commended the electronic-influenced composition and production. Commercially, it was successful in Japan, peaking at number two on the Oricon Singles Chart and Japan Hot 100 chart. It was certified gold by the Recording Industry Association of Japan (RIAJ) for shipments of 100,000 copies. An accompanying music video featured all seven members in a large neon-lit club, surrounded by expensive luxuries and audience members. In order to promote the single, it featured in three commercial endorsements in Japan, and eventually appeared on the set list of their 2017 Mad Cyclone tour.

== Background and release ==
After the release of their fourth studio album, Namida wo Nagasenai Pierrot wa Taiyou mo Tsuki mo nai Sora wo Miageta (2017), Generations conducted their fifth nationwide concert tour titled Mad Cyclone Live 2017. While on tour, several members from the group uploaded snippets of them backstage and their live performances; additionally, previews of their track "Mad Cyclone" were added to the visuals, indicating work on their new project. Prior to its announcement, the band revealed the track "Big City Rodeo" on several dates of their Mad Cyclone tour and, at the start of October 2017, Generations announced it would be released as a standard single. "Big City Rodeo" was written by Amon Hayashi, composed by fellow LDH-musicians Jay'ed and T.Kura, and produced by Exile Hiro and T.Kura. Recording of the song was held at Prime Sound Studios in Shibuya, Tokyo by Yutaro Wada, and was mixed by D.O.I. at Daimonion Recordings. Additionally, Jay'ed provided background vocals for the song.

Musically, "Big City Rodeo" is composed as a dance number that is heavily influenced by electro house music. Lyrically, the song focuses on a high lifestyle and luxury, which was eventually reflected onto the accompanying music video. "Big City Rodeo" premiered as the lead and only single from their first greatest hits compilation, Best Generations (2018). It was released on October 25, 2017 by Rhythm Zone in two physical formats, and for digital consumption. The standard track list for each edition features the single, and two B-side songs: "Mad Cyclone"—a techno-inspired anthem that was written by production duo Michico and T.Kura—and the English version of their previous single "Taiyou mo Tsuki mo". The CD-only version featured the instrumental versions of the first two songs, whereas the DVD format included the visuals to "Big City Rodeo" and "Mad Cyclone". First-press editions came with a bonus B-2 sized poster to promote the single.

== Reception ==
"Big City Rodeo" received positive reviews from music critics. Japanese publication T-Site News noted that it was a more "adult" approach to their sound, finding it a departure from their previous work. The review also described the tune as "catchy". Although describing the song's quality as "sharp", Japanese magazine CD Journal praised the involvement of producer T.Kura. They also highlighted "Mad Cyclone" as a stand out, praising Michico's songwriting and production. The staff at American publication AllMusic selected all three maxi-songs—"Big City Rodeo", "Mad Cyclone", and the English edit of "Taiyou mo Tsuki mo"—as some of their best work from their discography.

Commercially, "Big City Rodeo" was a success in Japan. It made its first appearance on the daily Oricon Singles Chart, selling over 50,000 copies in the first 24 hours. Based on a six-day figure, the single opened at number two on the Oricon Singles Chart, selling 72,955 copies in its first week. It fell to number 18 the following week, shifting only 3,801 units. It performed steadily for the next few weeks, until making a second appearance in the top ten during the Christmas holiday sales period; it reached number 10 with 12,186 units sold. The single ranked at 53 on Oricon's year-end chart, selling 117,842 units. It was certified gold by the Recording Industry Association of Japan (RIAJ) for shipments of 100,000 copies.

On the Japan Hot 100 chart, published by Billboard, "Big City Rodeo" debuted and peaked at number two, just behind Keyakizaka46's single "Kaze Ni Fukaretemo". Additionally, "Mad Cyclone" made an appearance at number 73. Its final appearance in the top ten was presented the following week, peaking at number 10 itself. In total, the song spent 11 weeks in the chart, and remains their highest entry on the Hot 100 to date. Additionally, "Big City Rodeo" managed to appear on three component charts; it reached number five on the Streaming Songs and Download Songs chart, and number two on the Hot Singles Sales chart.

== Music video ==
An accompany music video premiered on YouTube on September 28, 2017.

== Promotion and live performances ==
In order to promote the track, it made an appearance on three different commercials in Japan. It was first distributed on a commercial to commemorate Generation's 5th anniversary, promoted by HMV-Lawson's. Later, it appeared on a promotional campaign for Japanese electronics brand Daiichi Kosho Company, and was used as the theme song for Alpine Electronics. Apart from the first endorsement, none of the commercials featured members of Generations. The single's B-side "Mad Cyclone" was created specifically for their 2017 Mad Cyclone Live tour in Japan, and promoted as its main theme song. Nevertheless, both "Big City Rodeo" and the titular recording was added to the tour's accompanying set list.

== Track listing ==
- CD single
1. "Big City Rodeo" – 4:55
2. "Mad Cyclone" – 5:01
3. "Big City Rodeo" (Instrumental) – 4:55
4. "Mad Cyclone" (Instrumental) – 5:01
5. "Taiyou mo Tsuki mo" (English version) – 4:04
- DVD single
1. "Big City Rodeo" – 4:55
2. "Mad Cyclone" – 5:01
3. "Big City Rodeo" (Instrumental) – 4:55
4. "Mad Cyclone" (Instrumental) – 5:01
5. "Taiyou mo Tsuki mo" (English version) – 4:04
  1. "Big City Rodeo" (music video)
  2. "Mad Cyclone" (music video)
- Digital download
1. "Big City Rodeo" – 4:55
2. "Mad Cyclone" – 5:01
3. "Taiyou mo Tsuki mo" (English version) – 4:04

== Credits and personnel ==
Credits adapted by the liner notes of the physical editions of "Big City Rodeo".

Recording

- Recorded at Prime Sound Studios by Yutaro Wada, Shibuya, Tokyo. Mixed by D.O.I. at Daimonion Recordings.

Personnel

- Ryota Katayose – vocals, background vocals, performer
- Ryuto Kazuhara – vocals, background vocals, performer
- Alan Shirahama – performer
- Hayato Komori – performer
- Reo Sano – performer
- Mandy Segikuchi – performer
- Yuta Nakasuta – performer
- Amon Hayashi – songwriter
- T.Kura – composer, arranger, producer, vocal director, instrumentation
- Jay'ed – composer, background vocals
- Exile Hiro – producer
- Michico – songwriter, producer, background vocals, vocal director, instrumentation
- P.O.S. – songwriter
- Hikari – composer, producer
- Hani – composer
- Dejo – composer, producer
- Odake Masato – songwriter

Packaging

- Motoki Mizoguchi – art director, designer
- Mayumi Koshiishi – photographer
- Masataka Hattori – stylist
- Takeshi Teramoto – hair and make-up
- Koichi Inoue – producer
- Atsushi Hayasaka – producer
- Yusuke Hagiwara – producer

== Charts ==
=== Daily and weekly charts ===
Chart (2017–2018)	Peak position
Japan Hot 100 Chart (Billboard)	2
Japan Daily Singles Chart (Oricon)	2
Japan Weekly Singles Chart (Oricon)	2

=== Rankings ===
Chart (2017)	Peak position
Japan Hot Singles Sales Year-End Chart (Billboard)	69
Japan Monthly Chart (Oricon)	6
Japan Year-End Chart (Oricon)	53

== Certification and sales ==
Region	Certification	Certified units/sales
Japan (RIAJ) Physical	Gold	117,842
Japan Digital	—	3,271

== Release history ==
Region	Date	Format	Label
Japan	October 25, 2017	CD; DVD; digital download	Rhythm Zone
Australia	October 25, 2017	digital download	Avex Entertainment
New Zealand	October 25, 2017	digital download	Avex Entertainment
United Kingdom	October 25, 2017	digital download	Avex Entertainment
Ireland	October 25, 2017	digital download	Avex Entertainment
Germany	October 25, 2017	digital download	Avex Entertainment
France	October 25, 2017	digital download	Avex Entertainment
Spain	October 25, 2017	digital download	Avex Entertainment
Taiwan	October 25, 2017	digital download	Avex Entertainment
United States	October 25, 2017	digital download	Avex Entertainment
Canada	October 25, 2017	digital download	Avex Entertainment
