= Generations from Exile Tribe =

Japanese dance and vocal group

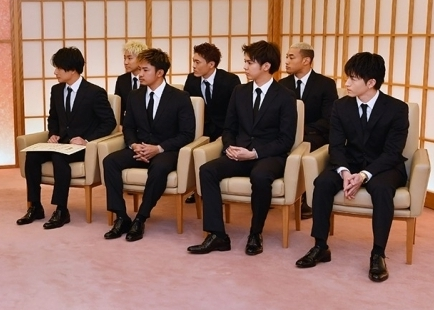
- Generations in March 2020

Background information
- Also known as: Generations
- Origin: Tokyo, Japan
- Genres: J-pop; dance-rock; dance-pop; R&B
- Years active: 2012–present
- Labels: LDH; Rhythm Zone
- Spinoff of: Exile; Exile Tribe
- Members: Alan Shirahama; Ryota Katayose; Ryuto Kazuhara; Hayato Komori; Reo Sano; Yuta Nakatsuka
- Past members: Mandy Sekiguchi
- Website: generations-ldh.jp

Generations from Exile Tribe (Japanese: ジェネレーションズ・フロム・エグザイル・トライブ, formerly known as Generations) is a six-member Japanese dance and vocal group formed and managed by LDH. The group is part of the "Exile Tribe" collective related to Exile and is signed to the record label Rhythm Zone from the Avex Group. Generations debuted on 21 November 2012.

== History ==
=== 2011–2012: Formation and pre-debut ===
In April 2011, Hiro of Exile began forming Generations. The candidate members started their activities in the summer of 2011, with a major debut as their goal. In April 2012, Alan Shirahama, Ryota Katayose, Ryuto Kazuhara, Hayato Komori, Reo Sano, and Mandy Sekiguchi were announced as members.

On 11 September 2012, it was announced that Yuta Nakatsuka, who had been a support member, would be added. Generations made their major debut on 21 November, with the single "Brave It Out", which was used as theme song for the NTV drama Sugarless starring Alan Shirahama and Reo Sano.

=== 2013–2014: Debut album: Generations ===
In January 2013, the group changed their name to Generations from Exile Tribe and released their second single, "Animal".

On 15 May 2013, Generations released their third single, "Love You More" as their first ballad single, it was their first single to include an English version of their previous single as a bonus track, and the first to be released in the One Coin CD and Music Card formats. The single was used as theme song for Samantha Thavasa CM "Samantha × Kawaii ×Art".

On 10 July, Generations and Sandaime J Soul Brothers released a collaborative single titled "Burning Up" as a part of Exile Tribe releases, it topped the oricon weekly ranking and sold approximately 263,625 copies in its first week of release.

On 13 November of the same year, they released their self-titled first original studio album, and achieved first place on the Oricon charts for the first time, selling approximately 49,000 copies in its initial week of release.

On 9 October, Generations released their 4th and last single of the year titled "Hot Shot", it sold 106,358 copies in its first week and ranked #2 on the Oricon weekly charts becoming their best selling single until the release of "All for you" later on 2015.

In January 2014, Hiro appointed Alan to be the leader of the group. On 23 April, the group released their 5th single, "Never Let You Go" and on 27 April, it was announced Alan and Mandy were two of five people who passed the final audition to join Exile as performers, making them currently members of both Exile and Generations. All members of Generations auditioned.

On 3 September 2014, the group released their sixth single "Always with you", it was used as the theme song for the Japanese drama Is There a Vet in the House? aired on NTV and YTV.

In November 2014, Generations announced they would release a new album in February, followed by a nationwide tour as well as a world tour. The world tour was scheduled to take place in June, with stops in Paris, London, Los Angeles, New York, Taipei, and Hong Kong.

=== 2015–2016: Generation Ex and Speedster ===
On 26 January 2015, Generations was appointed as "2015 Hong Kong Tourism Goodwill Ambassador". In addition, the first single of the year titled "Sing it Loud" was released on January, 28, which was used as the theme song for TBS drama "Daddy Detective".

The group released their second album, Generation Ex, on 18 February, the album reached the #1 position on the Oricon weekly chart, selling more than 64,000 copies in its first week.

From 4 April to 28 June, Generations went on their first nationwide hall tour and world tour "Generations World Tour 2015 "Generation EX".

On 13 May, Generations released their eighth single, "Evergreen", followed by their ninth single, "Hard Knock Days" on 12 August, which was chosen as the 18th opening for Fuji TV's popular anime One Piece.

On 16 September 2015, the group released their 10th single "All For You", which was used as theme song for the movie Girl's Step, starring E-girls member Anna Ishii. The single reached the #1 position on both the daily and weekly Oricon charts, making this Generations' first #1 single.

On 27 January 2016, the group released their 11th single "AGEHA" as their first single of the year, which later won best choreography at 2016 MTV Video Music Awards Japan. On 2 March, they released their third album Speedster. The album sold 71,000 copies in its first week and topped the Oricon weekly ranking.

From 23 April to 25 December, Generations went on their first nationwide Arena Tour "Generations Live Tour 2016 "Speedster" for which they performed in 18 venues around Japan with a total of 41 performances.

On 29 June 2016, the group released their 12th single and their second single of the year, titled Namida (涙) which is their first ballad single with "no dance music video". The single sold 94,000 copies in its first week of release, and reached #1 position on the weekly Oricon charts becoming their second #1 single after "All For You".

On 16 November, Generations released their 13th single, "Pierrot" as their last single of the year. It debuted at number two on the Oricon weekly singles chart and peaked at number 3 on Billboard Japan Hot 100.

=== 2017–2018: Mad Cyclone and United Journey ===
On 17 April 2017, the group released their 14th single, "Taiyou mo Tsuki mo" (太陽も月も), with its music video shot in Los Angeles. The song was chosen as the theme song for Aoyama Prestige Technology "Lost and Found" TV CM and also to promote Rohto Pharmaceutical "Oxy" with both CMs featuring the group's leader Alan Shirahama.

On 17 May 2017, Generations went on their second world tour "Generations 2017 World Tour ～Speedster～" which was scheduled to take place in Taipei, Taiwan, Macau, Los Angeles, New York, London and as a last stop Paris on 2 and 4 June. However, due to the Manchester terror attack, European live performances got cancelled.

On 5 July 2017, the group's 4th studio album Namida o Nagasenai Pierrot wa Taiyou mo Tsuki mo nai Sora o Miageta was released. The title is a reference to the album's tracks "Namida", "Pierrot" and "Taiyou mo Tsuki mo" and to the song "Sora" (空) which was chosen as the theme song for the movie "My brother loves me too much" starring Ryota and was also used to promote the album. It later peaked at number two on the Oricon weekly chart selling more than 94,000 copies in its first week making it their best selling album before the release of their first best album.

The group launched their second nationwide Arena Tour "Generations Live Tour 2017 Mad Cyclone", which started on 22 July and ended on 17 December with a total of 29 performances in 11 venues across Japan.

On 27 September 2017, the group released the music video of their 15th single "Big City Rodeo" which was announced to be released on 25 October. The song peaked at number two on Oricon and Billiboard Japan Hot 100 with estimated physical sales of 117,842 and digital sales of 3271.

On 1 January 2018, Generations released their first best album titled Best Generation, which include all singles and music videos since their debut up to "Big City Rodeo" plus their new song "Alright! Alright!". The album was released in a Japanese edition and an international edition and peaked at number two on the Oricon weekly chart, selling more than 100,000 copies in the first week of its release.

In March 2018, Generations collaborated for the first time with American fashion brand Guess on a unisex capsule collection. In the same month, the group held their China tour "Generations China Tour 2018 ～Mad Cyclone～" which took place in Shenzhen, Beijing, and Shanghai.

In May, Generations launched their first dome tour "Generations Live Tour 2018 United Journey", performing from 12 May to 5 August in four dome venues: Nagoya, Osaka, Fukuoka, and Tokyo.

The group released their 16th single "F.L.Y. BOYS F.L.Y. GIRLS" on 13 June 2018, which included as B-side tracks, "United Journey", the theme song of their dome tour, and Mata, Ashita (また、アシタ) the theme song for drama Love Rerun starring actress Anne Nakamura. The single peaked at number two on Oricon and Billboard Japan Hot 100.

On 31 October, the group released their seventeenth single Shonen (少年) as their first ballad single release in 2 years.

In 29 November, Generations and E-girls were chosen to promote the "Energy Project" by LDH martial arts by releasing 2 digital singles "G-ENERGY" and "EG-ENERGY", respectively.

=== 2019: Shonen Chronicle and Battle of Tokyo ===
On 26 May 2019, Generations announced on a live episode of their internet TV show Generations High School TV that they would be releasing one single per month for 3 consecutive months starting in July. On the same episode, the group announced they will hold their first national five dome tour titled Generations Live Tour 2019 "Shonen Chronicle" beginning 31 August at Sapporo Dome and ending on 15 December in Fukuoka Yahuoku Dome.

In June 2019, the Battle of Tokyo project started, which includes all Jr.Exile groups. During this month those 4 groups released collaboration singles every week, until they released a full album titled Battle of Tokyo 〜Enter the Jr.Exile〜 on 3 July. Accompanying the album release, the groups held a row of live performances from 4 to 7 July with the same name.

The first single of their 3-month project, released on 17 July, is titled "Brand New Story", which was used as the theme song of the anime movie Ride Your Wave in which Ryota voiced as the main character. To promote the single, a music video was released on 21 June featuring the members in animated form created by Science Saru. The single included "Control Myself" as a B-side track, being the group's first original English song featuring Mandy as a rapper.

On 5 July 2019, during the second day of Battle of Tokyo 〜Enter The Jr.Exile〜, it was announced that the second single of the project is titled "Dreamers". The music video was released on 31 July in a short drama format with a duration over 11 min, the story showcased different types of "dreamers" played by the members with each one being in a different type of situation, showing what they would possibly do if they were not part of Generations. Musically speaking, "Dreamers" is the first group's song with a simple acoustic guitar sound and a slow tempo. The single featured the B-side "A New Chronicle", the theme song of the group's dome tour, and was released on 28 August.

On 31 August 2019, it was announced that the third single and the last of the project is titled "EXPerience Greatness", the capitalized words of the title make reference to EXPG (Exile Professional Gym) as the song was created with the intention of sharing dreams with students of EXPG STUDIO and to march forward with them. The single's music video was released on 11 September, showcasing about 2,000 EXPG STUDIO students in various scenes. The single was released on 25 September featuring the track "Snake Pit" as a B-side, one of the songs in the soundtrack of the movie High & Low: The Worst in which Hayato and Yuta made their debut as actors.

On 3 October 2019, it was announced that Generations would release their fifth studio album titled Shonen Chronicle on 21 November. It would include all tracks from their previous 3-month project alongside Ryuto's first solo song "Nostalgie" and 2 new songs, "One in a Million -kiseki no yoru ni-", the theme song for the movie Kiss Me at the Stroke of Midnight starring Ryota and "Shinsei", which was written by Ryuto and Alan's first work as a sound producer. The CD/DVD and CD/Blu-ray editions of the album included each member version of the "Dreamers" Music Video. On 14 November 2019, Generations made their first appearance on the 70th NHK Kōhaku Uta Gassen and the first in the Reiwa period.

=== 2020: Live×Online ===
On 21 February 2020, it was revealed that the group would release their second collaboration with American fashion brand Guess consisting of a new collection, lookbook and Pop-up in Tokyo.

On 4 March 2020, Generations were selected as Japan & United Arab Emirates Goodwill Ambassadors. On 10 March 2020, the group unveiled their first single of the year titled "Hira Hira", which was released on 15 April. On 11 May, the group released a new digital song "You & I".

From 18 April to 5 July, the group was scheduled to hold their dome tour Generations Perfect Live 2012▶2020, which would be part of LDH Perfect Year 2020: Season 2 "Imagination", but due to COVID-19 pandemic, all performances were cancelled. In compensation, Generations held a series of livestreamed concerts on the Japanese streaming platform AbemaTV from July to December. Live×Online "Generations" was held on 6 July, and Live×Online Imagination "Generations" was held on 23 September. On 31 October, they held Generations Live×Online Infinity "Strange Halloween Night", and finally Generations Live×Online 2020 Ballad Best ~Orchestra Live~ on 27 December.

On 27 September, it was announced that LDH Pictures' 4th Cinema fighters project "Kinou Yori Akaku Ashita Yori Aoku", which consists of six short films would feature 6 of Generations members as lead actors while Ryuto Kazuhara would be in charge of one of the theme songs, the project would be released in 2021.

On 18 November, the group released their 24th single titled "Loading...", it includes their previous digitally released single" You & I", and "Star Traveling", the theme song of the movie One in a Hundred Thousand starring Alan Shirahama. On December 31, the group appeared on the 71st NHK Kōhaku Uta Gassen, performing for the second year in a row.

=== 2021: Up & Down ===
On 10 February, Generations released their first single of the year titled "Ame Nochi Hare" as the theme song of TV Asahi Saturday night drama Mokomi: She's a little weird.

On 18 April, a new album by Jr.Exile for the Battle of Tokyo Project titled Battle of Tokyo Time 4 Jr.Exile was announced to be released on 23 June, the songs by the individual groups and the collaboration song of Generations & The Rampage were pre-released digitally from 19 April to 21 June, the music videos were released in a hybrid live-action/animated form, with this latter featuring the four groups' avatars. Moreover, the DVD Version included the concert video of "Battle Of Tokyo ~Enter The Jr.Exile~" held in Makuhari Messe in July 2019.

On the first of May, the group released a new song titled "Hello! Halo!" digitally which was used as theme song for the NHK ETV show E Dance Academy. From 20 May to 2 June, Generations held a live tour titled Generations Live×Offline "Loading...", the title makes reference to the Live×Online concerts held in 2020, with Offline meaning the resume of audience attendance. On the first day of the tour, the group announced their sixth album titled Up & Down, which was released on 14 July. As a commemoration for the release, Generations held a special national event titled Generations Love Post in hall venues from 5 September to 21 December.

On 6 October, Generations released their 26th single titled "Unchained World" as the ending theme song for Netflix anime Baki Hanma. Its CD single jacket illustration features the seven members of the unit, along with three characters from the anime - the protagonist Baki Hanma, Yujiro "Ogre" Hanma, and Biscuit Oliva.

On 18 November, a premiere screening event & special live show was held for the 4th Cinema fighters project "Kinou Yori Akaku Ashita Yori Aoku" prior to the nationwide release on 26 November. Aside from the premiere screening event, the artists performed the theme songs of the films. On 22 December, the group released the tribute single "Generations from Exile" as a part of Exile's 20th anniversary celebration project "Exile Tribute", the single is the last of the four consecutive tribute singles releases by Jr.Exile groups. On 31 December, the group appeared on the 72nd NHK Kōhaku Uta Gassen, performing for the third year in a row.

=== 2022—present: Wonder Square ===
On 11 March, the group held a live tour titled Generations Live Tour 2022 "Wonder Square" with a 3-day opening concert at the Tokyo Dome. Generations revealed their first single of 2022 as the theme song for Fuji TV's drama "Teppachi!" starring Gekidan Exile's Keita Machida, it included the track "Atarashii Sekai" previously streamed on 23 May, the single was released on 3 August in three editions. On 30 April, 2024, Sekiguchi announced that he would be graduating from Generations and leaving his agency LDH to become independent.

== Members ==
- Alan Shirahama (白濱 亜嵐)
- Ryota Katayose (片寄 涼太)
- Ryuto Kazuhara (数原 龍友)
- Hayato Komori (小森 隼)
- Reo Sano (佐野 玲於)
- Yuta Nakatsuka (中務 裕太)

=== Graduated members ===
Mandy Sekiguchi (関口 メンディー) (2024)

== Discography ==
=== Studio albums ===
List of albums, with selected chart positions
| Title | Details | Chart positions | | | Certifications |
| Title | Details | JPN | JPN Hot (Note: Sources for chart positions are as follows: Speedster, Namida o Nagasenai, Shonen Chronicle, Up & Down, X, 6ix Piece.) | TWN East Asia | Certifications |
|---|---|---|---|---|---|
| Generations | Released: 13 November 2013 (JPN); Label: Rhythm Zone; Formats: CD, CD/DVD, CD/Blu-ray, digital download | 1 | — | 10 | RIAJ: Gold |
| Generation Ex | Released: 18 February 2015 (JPN); Label: Rhythm Zone; Formats: CD, CD/DVD, CD/Blu-ray, digital download | 1 | — | — | RIAJ: Gold |
| Speedster | Release: 2 March 2016 (JPN); Label: Rhythm Zone; Formats: CD, CD/DVD, CD/Blu-ray, digital download | 1 | 1 | — | RIAJ: Gold |
| Namida o Nagasenai Pierrot wa Taiyou mo Tsuki mo nai Sora o Miageta | Release: 5 July 2017 (JPN); Label: Rhythm Zone; Formats: CD, CD/DVD, CD/Blu-ray, digital download | 2 | 2 | — | RIAJ: Gold |
| Shonen Chronicle | Release: 21 November 2019 (JPN); Label: Rhythm Zone; Formats: CD, CD/DVD, CD/Blu-ray, digital download | 2 | 3 | — | — |
| Up & Down | Release: 14 July 2021 (JPN); Label: Rhythm Zone; Formats: CD, CD/DVD, CD/Blu-ray, digital download | 3 | 3 | — | — |
| X | Release: 8 March 2023 (JPN); Label: Rhythm Zone; Formats: CD, CD/DVD, CD/Blu-ray, digital download | 2 | 3 | — | — |
| 6ix Piece | Release: 17 December 2025 (JPN); Label: Rhythm Zone; Formats: CD, CD/DVD, CD/Blu-ray, digital download | 7 | 36 | — | — |
"—" denotes items that did not chart.

=== Compilation albums ===
List of compilation albums, with selected details, peak chart positions and certifications
| Title | Details | Chart positions | | Certifications |
| Title | Details | JPN | JPN Hot | Certifications |
|---|---|---|---|---|
| Best Generation | Released: 1 January 2018 (JPN); Label: Rhythm Zone; Formats: CD, CD/DVD, CD/Blu-ray, digital download | 2 | 2 | RIAJ: Gold |

=== Singles ===
==== As lead artists ====
List of singles, with selected chart positions
| Title | Year | Chart positions | | Certifications | Album |
| Title | Year | JPN | JPN Hot (Note: Sources for chart positions are as follows: "Brave It Out", "Animal", "Love You More", "Burning Up", "Hot Shot", "Never Let You Go", "Always with You", "Sing It Loud", "Evergreen", "Hard Knock Days", "All for You", "Ageha", "Namida", "Pierrot", "Taiyou Mo Tsuki Mo", "Big City Rodeo", "F.L.Y. Boys F.L.Y. Girls", "Shounen", "Brand New Story", "Dreamers", "EXPerience Greatness", "Hira Hira", "Ame Nochi Hare", "Unchained World", "Chikara no Kagiri", "Diamonds", "Vibe".) | Certifications | Album |
|---|---|---|---|---|---|
| "Brave It Out" | 2012 | 3 | 5 | RIAJ (physical): Gold | Generations |
| "Animal" | 2013 | 2 | 4 | RIAJ (physical): Gold | Generations |
| "Love You More" | 2013 | 3 | 5 | RIAJ (PC): Gold | Generations |
| "Hot Shot" | 2013 | 2 | 8 | | Generations |
| "Never Let You Go" | 2014 | 2 | 6 | | Generation Ex |
| "Always with You" | 2014 | 3 | 7 | | Generation Ex |
| "Sing It Loud" | 2015 | 3 | 5 | | Generation Ex |
| "Evergreen" | 2015 | 2 | 5 | RIAJ (physical): Gold | Speedster |
| "Hard Knock Days" | 2015 | 2 | 4 | RIAJ (physical): Gold | Speedster |
| "All for You" | 2015 | 1 | 9 | RIAJ (physical): Gold | Speedster |
| "Ageha" | 2016 | 2 | 1 | | Speedster |
| "Namida" (涙, Tear) | 2016 | 1 | 1 | RIAJ (physical): Gold | Namida o Nagasenai Pierrot wa Taiyou mo Tsuki mo Nai Sora o Miageta |
| "Pierrot" | 2016 | 2 | 3 | RIAJ (physical): Gold | Namida o Nagasenai Pierrot wa Taiyou mo Tsuki mo Nai Sora o Miageta |
| "Taiyou mo Tsuki mo" (太陽も月も, The Sun and the Moon) | 2017 | 6 | 3 | | Namida o Nagasenai Pierrot wa Taiyou mo Tsuki mo Nai Sora o Miageta |
| "Big City Rodeo" | 2017 | 2 | 2 | RIAJ (physical): Gold | Best Generation |
| "F.L.Y. Boys F.L.Y. Girls" | 2018 | 2 | 3 | RIAJ (physical): Gold | Shonen Chronicle |
| "Shonen" (少年, Boy) | 2018 | 2 | 2 | RIAJ (physical): Gold | Shonen Chronicle |
| "Brand New Story" | 2019 | 7 | 13 | | Shonen Chronicle |
| "Dreamers" | 2019 | 2 | 4 | | Shonen Chronicle |
| "EXPerience Greatness" | 2019 | 7 | 19 | | Shonen Chronicle |
| "Hira Hira" (ヒラヒラ, Fluttering) | 2020 | 5 | 8 | | Up & Down |
| "Loading..." | 2020 | 5 | — | | Up & Down |
| "Ame Nochi Hare" (雨のち晴れ, Sunny after rain) | 2021 | 4 | 30 | | Up & Down |
| "Unchained World" | 2021 | 6 | 46 | | X |
| "Generations from Exile" | 2021 | 5 | — | | X |
| "Chikara no Kagiri" (チカラノカギリ, With all of my strength) | 2021 | 3 | 2 | | X |
| "Party7: Genejanight" | 2022 | 3 | — | | X |
| "Diamonds" | 2023 | — | 66 | | Non-album singles |
| "Vibe" | 2026 | 5 | 38 | | Non-album singles |
"—" denotes items that did not chart.

==== As featured artists ====
| Title | Year | Peak chart positions | | Certifications | Album |
| Title | Year | Oricon Singles Chart | Billboard Japan Hot 100 | Certifications | Album |
|---|---|---|---|---|---|
| "Burning Up" (among Exile Tribe) (Note: Instead of featuring all members of Exile Tribe, "Burning Up" was a collaboration between Sandaime J Soul Brothers and Generations.) | 2013 | 1 | 3 | RIAJ (physical): Gold | Non-album single |

==== Digital singles ====
| Title | Year | Ref. |
|---|---|---|
| "G-Energy" | 2018 | |
| "You & I" | 2020 | |
| "Hello! Halo!" | 2021 | |
| "Atarashii Sekai" | 2022 | |

=== Participating works ===
| Title | Year | Artist | Album |
|---|---|---|---|
| "Bloom" (Note: Featured in chorus.) | 2012 | Exile | Exile Best Hits: Love Side |
| "Go On" | 2013 | Generations from Exile Tribe | Burning Up (single) |
| "Organ Donor" (Off da Hook) | 2014 | DJ Makidai (feat. Generations from Exile Tribe & Sway) | Exile Tribe Perfect Mix |
| "The Revolution" | 2014 | Exile Tribe | Exile Tribe Revolution |
| "24World" | 2014 | Exile Tribe | Exile Tribe Revolution |
| "Run This Town" | 2016 | Generations from Exile Tribe | High & Low Original Best Album |
| "Higher Ground" (feat. Dimitri Vegas & Like Mike) | 2016 | Exile Tribe | High & Low Original Best Album |
| "Unbreakable" | 2016 | Generations vs. The Rampage | High & Low Original Best Album |
| "Roam Around" | 2017 | PKCZ® (feat. Generations from Exile Tribe) | 360° ChamberZ |
| "Happila" | 2018 | Dance Earth Party feat. Generations from Exile Tribe | Happila (single) |
| "Nanimo Kamo ga Setsunai" (何もかもがせつない) | 2018 | Generations from Exile Tribe | Uta Monogatari – Cinema Fighters Project (bonus CD) |
| "Shoot It Out" | 2019 | Generations vs. The Rampage | Battle of Tokyo 〜Enter The Jr.Exile〜 |
| "Supersonic" | 2019 | Generations vs. Fantastics | Battle of Tokyo 〜Enter The Jr.Exile〜 |
| "Break Down Ya Walls" | 2019 | Generations vs. Ballistik Boyz | Battle of Tokyo 〜Enter The Jr.Exile〜 |
| "Need Is Your Love" | 2019 | Joji & Generations from Exile Tribe | Head in the Clouds II |
| "Way to the Glory" | 2021 | Junior Exile | Rising Sun to the World (single) |

=== Video albums ===
List of media, with selected chart positions
| Title | Video details | Peak chart positions | | Certifications |
| Title | Video details | JPN DVD | JPN BD | Certifications |
|---|---|---|---|---|
| Generations Live Tour 2016 Speedster | Released: 28 December 2016; Label: Rhythm Zone; Formats: DVD · Blu-ray | 2 | 3 | RIAJ (physical): Gold |
| Generations Live Tour 2017 Mad Cyclone | Released: 28 February 2018; Label: Rhythm Zone; Formats: DVD · Blu-ray | 1 | 1 | RIAJ (physical): Gold |
| Generations Live Tour 2018 United Journey | Released: 23 January 2019; Label: Rhythm Zone; Formats: DVD · Blu-ray | 2 | 3 | RIAJ (physical): Gold |
| Generations Live Tour 2019 Shonen Chronicle | Released: 11 March 2020; Label: Rhythm Zone; Formats: DVD · Blu-ray | 1 | 1 | |

== Live ==
=== As a lead artists ===
| Year | Period | Title |
|---|---|---|
| 2015 | From 4 April to 28 June | Generations World Tour 2015 "Generation Ex" |
| 2016 | From 23 April to 25 December | Generations Live Tour 2016 "Speedster" |
| 2017 | From 17 to 28 May | Generations from Exile Tribe World Tour 2017 〜Speedster〜 |
| 2017 | From 22 July to 18 December | Generations Live Tour 2017 "Mad Cyclone" |
| 2018 | From 2 to 18 March | Generations China Tour 2018 "Mad Cyclone" |
| 2018 | From 12 May to 5 August | Generations Live Tour 2018 "United Journey" |
| 2019 | From 31 August to 15 December | Generations Live Tour 2019 "Shonen Chronicle" |
| 2020 | ~~From 18 April to 5 July~~ | ~~GENERATIONS PERFECT LIVE 2012▶︎2020~~ |
| 2021 | From 20 May to 2 June | GENERATIONS LIVE×OFFLINE "Loading..." |
| 2022 | From 11 March to 22 November | Generations Live Tour 2022 "Wonder Square" |

=== As a participating group ===
| Year | Period | Title | Group |
|---|---|---|---|
| 2014 | From 15 to 20 June | Exile Tribe Perfect Year 2014 Special Stage "The Survival" In Saitama Super Arena 10 Days | Exile Tribe |
| 2014 | From 3 September to 28 December | Exile Tribe Perfect Year Live Tour Tower of Wish 2014 〜The Revolution〜 | Exile Tribe |
| 2016 | From 22 July to 3 October | High & Low The Live | Exile Tribe |
| 2019 | From 4 to 7 July | Battle of Tokyo 〜Enter The Jr.Exile〜 | Generations, The Rampage, Fantastics, Ballistik Boyz from Exile Tribe |

=== As supporting members ===
| Year | Period | Title | Group |
|---|---|---|---|
| 2012 | From April to July | Exile Tribe Live Tour 2012 〜Tower of Wish〜 | Exile Tribe |
| 2012 | From September to December | Sandaime J Soul Brothers Live Tour 2012 0〜ZERO〜 | Sandaime J Soul Brothers |
| 2013 | From April to September | Exile Live Tour 2013 "Exile Pride" | Exile |

== Filmography ==
=== TV series ===
| Year | Title | Network | Ref. |
|---|---|---|---|
| 2011–present | "Weekly Exile" (週間EXILE) | TBS | |
| 2014–15 | EXILE Casino | Fuji TV | |
| 2017–19 | Generations High School TV (GENERATIONS高校TV) | TV Asahi | |

=== Internet programs ===
| Year | Title | Network | Ref. |
|---|---|---|---|
| 2014 | Dream.Power.Challenge | YouTube | |
| 2017–present | Generations High School TV (GENERATIONS高校TV) | Abema TV | |

=== Radio ===
| Year | Title | Network |
|---|---|---|
| 2013–present | Generations no Genetalk | JFN |

=== Advertisements ===
| Year | Title | Ref. |
|---|---|---|
| 2014 | Lawson (Ponta Card) | |
| 2015 | Bourbon "Fettucine Gummy" | |
| 2016 | Nintendo 3DS system software "Pocket Monster Sun & Moon " | |
| 2017 | Y!mobile | |
| 2017 | Alpen/Sports Depo | |
| 2017 | Daiichi Kosho "LIive Dam Stadium Stage" | |
| 2018 | Bourbon "Fettucine Gummy" | |
| 2018 | Adidas "Z.N.E. Hoodie Fast Release" | |
| 2018 | Aoyama Tailor "Party Formal" | |
| 2019 | Aoyama Tailor "Generations for Freshers" | |
| 2019 | Bourbon "Jaga Choco" & "Cheese Jaga" | |

=== Music videos ===
| Year | Release date | Title | Artist | Album |
|---|---|---|---|---|
| 2011 | 24 September | "Rising Sun" | Exile | Rising Sun/ Itsuka Kitto... (single) |
| 2012 | 5 December | "Bloom" | Exile | Exile Best Hits: Love Side |
| 2013 | 16 January | "Inochi no rhythm" | Dance Earth Party | Inochi no rhythm (single) |
| 2014 | 3 April | "Exile Pride (Konna Sekai o Ai Suru Tame)" | Exile | Exile Pride (Konna Sekai o Ai Suru Tame) (single) |

== Other ==
| Year | Role | Ref. |
|---|---|---|
| 2015 | Hong Kong Tourism Goodwill Ambassadors | |
| 2020 | Japan & United Arab Emirates Goodwill Ambassadors | |

== Awards ==
| Year | Ceremony | Award | Nominee/Work | Result |
|---|---|---|---|---|
| 2014 | VMAJ | Best Pop Video | "Hot Shot" | Nominated |
| 2016 | VMAJ | Best Choreography | "Ageha" | Won |
| 2017 | Model press readers choose the best artist award 2017 | Best Artist Award | — | Won |
| 2020 | VMAJ | Best Art Direction Video | "One in a million" | Won |

== Photobook ==
| | Year | Release date | Title | Ref |
|---|---|---|---|---|
| 1st | 2014 | 13 June | Generations from Exile Tribe | |
| 2nd | 2015 | 18 December | Photograph of Dreamers | |
