= Speedster (album) =

SPEEDSTER

Studio album by Generations from Exile Tribe
- Released: March 2, 2016
- Language: Japanese
- Label: Rhythm Zone

Generations from Exile Tribe chronology
Generation Ex (2015)	SPEEDSTER (2016)	Namida wo Nagasenai Piero wa Taiyou mo Tsuki mo nai Sora wo Miageta (2017)

Speedster (styled SPEEDSTER) is the third studio album by Japanese boy band Generations from Exile Tribe. It was released on March 2, 2016. It was number one on the Oricon weekly Albums Chart on its release, with 71,380 copies sold. It was also number one on the Billboard Japan Hot Albums chart and also on the Billboard Japan Top Album Sales chart.

== Track listing ==
No.	Title	Length
1.	"AGEHA"
2.	"Rainy Room"
3.	"ALL FOR YOU"
4.	"LOADSTAR"
5.	"Gimme!"
6.	"Tell Me Why"
7.	"Evergreen"
8.	"TRANSFORM"
9.	"Hard Knock Days"
10.	"I Believe In Miracles"
11.	"...for you"
12.	"PAGES"

== Charts ==
Chart (2016)	Peak position
Japan Oricon weekly Albums Chart	1
Japan Billboard Japan weekly Hot Albums chart	1
Japan Billboard Japan weekly Top Album Sales chart	1
