= Generation Ex (album) =

Studio album by Generations from Exile Tribe
- Released: February 18, 2015
- Recorded: 2014–2015
- Genre: J-pop
- Length: 52:48
- Language: Japanese
- Label: Rhythm Zone
- Producer: Exile Hiro, Masato Matsuura

Generations from Exile Tribe chronology
| Generations (2013) | Generation Ex (2015) | Speedster (2016) |

Singles from Generation Ex
- 1. "Never Let You Go" Released: April 23, 2014; 2. "Always With You" Released: September 3, 2014; 3. "Sing It Loud" Released: January 25, 2015

Generation Ex, stylized as GENERATION EX, is the second studio album by Japanese boy band Generations from Exile Tribe, released on February 18, 2015. The album contains three previously released singles — "Never Let You Go", "Always With You", and "Sing It Loud"— all of which achieved positions within the top three on the Oricon weekly singles chart.

The album debuted at the number one spot on the Oricon weekly album chart, moving over 64,000 copies in its first week, 15,000 more than their first album "Generations". This is the group's second consecutive album since debut to reach the top of the chart. Generation Ex also received the Gold certification for the month of February by RIAJ for shipping over 100,000 copies.

== Release ==
Generation Ex is Generations' second album, released approximately 1 year and 4 months since their eponymous debut album. The album contains 13 tracks, 7 of which are new and the remaining from previous singles. The DVD and Blu-ray editions contain a special 60-minute documentary of the group. First-press limited editions of the DVD and Blu-ray editions also come with a 60-page photobook.

The album is released in 3 editions: a CD-only edition; a CD and DVD edition; and a CD and Blu-ray edition.

== Promotion ==
The singles contained in the album were all released prior. Released as the first single on April 23, 2014, "Never Let You Go" peaked at number two on the Oricon weekly singles chart. The second single "Always With You" was released on September 3, 2014, peaking at number three on the weekly Oricon singles chart. In 2015, "Sing It Loud" was released as the third single on 25 January, less than one month before the release of "Generation Ex". It peaked at number three on the weekly Oricon singles chart as well.

Despite being a single by itself, "Sing It Loud" is promoted as the album's lead track. Generations went on Music Station on February 27, 2015, to perform the song as promotion for the album. The group will also embark on a Japan nationwide tour and world tour following the release of the album.

== Track listing ==
CD track list
| No. | Title | Lyrics | Music | Length |
|---|---|---|---|---|
| 1. | "Sing It Loud" | Amon Hayashi for Digz Inc Group | Zetton, Shikata, Chris Hope, J Faith | 4:26 |
| 2. | "Everlasting" | Haruka Mizuguchi for Digz Inc Group | Ryosuke Tanaka | 4:57 |
| 3. | "Higher" | Maria Okada | Sky Beatz, Fast Lane, Chris Hope, J Faith | 4:03 |
| 4. | "Always With You" | Haruka Mizuguchi | Sky Beatz, Fast Lane | 3:45 |
| 5. | "My Only Love" | Maria Okada | Fast Lane, Tesung Kim, Casper | 4:23 |
| 6. | "Pump It" | Amon Hayashi for Digz Inc Group | Sky Beatz, Shikata, Chris Hope, J Faith | 4:05 |
| 7. | "Revolver" | P.O.S. | Sky Beatz, Shikata, Chris Hope | 4:05 |
| 8. | "Think Of You" | Maria Okada | Hikari, Sirius, Big-F | 3:50 |
| 9. | "Never Let You Go" | Maria Okada | Sky Beatz, Fast Lane, Chris Hope, J Faith | 4:12 |
| 10. | "Make It Real" | P.O.S. | Zetton, Fast Lane, Chris Hope, J Faith | 3:28 |
| 11. | "I Remember" | Ryuto Kazuhara | Fast Lane, Chris Hope, J Faith | 3:45 |
| 12. | "Story" | Ryota Katayose | Sirius, Jonas Zekkari, Gabriel Alares, Big-F | 3:47 |
| 13. | "Hana (花)" | Orange Range | Orange Range | 4:09 |
| Total length: | | | | 52:48 |

DVD / Blu-ray disc track list
| No. | Title | Director | Length |
|---|---|---|---|
| 1. | "Never Let You Go" (Music Video) | Shigeaki Kubo | 4:44 |
| 2. | "Always With You" (Music Video) | Shigeaki Kubo | 5:25 |
| 3. | "Sing It Loud" (Music Video) | Shigeaki Kubo | 4:46 |
| 4. | "Generations Document Movie" | Masaki Kobayashi | 56:41 |
| Total length: | | | 71:36 |

== Charts ==
| Chart | Peak | Sales |
|---|---|---|
| Japan Oricon Weekly Chart | 1 | 64,429 |
| Japan Oricon Monthly Chart | 5 | 72,551 |
| Billboard Japan Top Albums | 1 | __ |
