= Sugarless (manga) =

Japanese manga series by Masami Hosokawa (2010–2013)

シュガーレス
- Genre: Yankī
- Manga
- Written by: Masami Hosokawa
- Published by: Akita Shoten
- Magazine: Weekly Shōnen Champion
- Original run: January 21, 2010 – April 11, 2013
- Volumes: 18
- Television drama
- Directed by: Takashi Kubota
- Written by: Hiroyuki Yatsu; Kei Watanabe
- Studio: NTV Music; VAP
- Original network: NTV
- Original run: 3 October 2012 – 27 December 2012
- Episodes: 12

Sugarless (シュガーレス) is a Japanese manga series by Masami Hosokawa. It was adapted into a live-action television series in 2012. The TV series aired from October to December 2012

== Cast ==
- Alan Shirahama as Gaku Shiiba
- Nobuyuki Suzuki as Taiji Marumo
- Keita Machida as Osamu Urabe
- Reo Sano as Shirō Mukai
