= Alan Shirahama =

- 白濱亜嵐
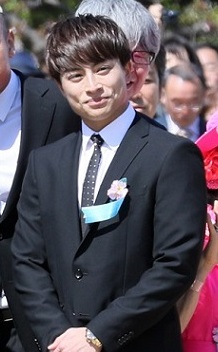
- Shirahama in July 2019
- Born: 4 August 1993 (age 33); Matsuyama, Ehime Prefecture, Japan
- Education: Hinode High School
- Occupations: Dancer; actor; DJ
- Years active: 2010–present
- Height: 173 cm (5 ft 8 in)
- Relatives: Loveli (older sister) Ryu (younger brother)
- Musical career
- Genres: J-pop, dance
- Labels: LDH, Rhythm Zone
- Member of: Exile, Generations from Exile Tribe
- Website: ldh.co.jp

Alan Shirahama (白濱亜嵐, Shirahama Aran; born 4 August 1993) is a Japanese performer, actor, and DJ who is a member of Exile and also the leader of the Japanese all-male dance and music group Generations from Exile Tribe. Alan is represented with LDH.

== Early life ==
Shirahama was born on 4 August 1993 to a Filipino mother and a Japanese father. He has a younger brother, Ryu, a former trainee of SM Entertainment. He participated in NCT Lastart but ultimately was not chosen for the final lineup. Alan also has an elder sister, Loveli, who is a fashion model and television personality.

In 2008, he started attending Matsuyama's EXPG (Exile Professional Gym).

== Career ==
=== 2009–2012: Pre-debut ===
In April 2010 Shirahama became a member of Gekidan EXILE (Exile Theatrical Company) which he withdrew from after getting selected as Generations' candidate member in July 2011.

In March 2012, he graduated from Hinode High School; and he became an official member of the group in April 2012.

He played his first lead role in NTV's drama Sugarless starring Gaku Shiiba whose theme song "Brave it Out" was decided as Generations' major debut song.

=== 2014–present: Breakthrough ===
In January 2014, Hiro appointed Shirahama to be the leader of Generations.

On 27 April 2014, Shirahama was one of five people who passed the final audition to join Exile as a performer, making him currently a member of both Exile and Generations.

On 31 October 2015, he began his career as a DJ on the stage of "U・F・O~Electric Halloween~ MIXed by PKCZ".

== Filmography ==
=== Movies ===
Year	Title	Role	Notes	Ref.
2014	7 Days Report	Ryota Maesawa	Lead role	
2016	Road to High & Low	Bernie		
2016	High & Low: The Movie	Bernie		
2017	Daytime Shooting Star	Daiki Mamura		
2017	High&Low The Movie 2 / End of Sky	Bernie		
2017	High&Low The Movie 3 / Final Mission	Bernie		
2020	Kizoku Kourin -Prince of Legend-	Shintaro Ando	Lead role	
2020	The Confidence Man JP: Episode of the Princess	Andrew Hu		
2020	One in a Hundred Thousand	Ren Kiritani	Lead role	
2023	Sana	Himself	Lead role	
2027	High&Low: The New World			

=== Short films ===
Year	Title	Role	Notes	Ref.
2018	Uta Monogatari: Cinema Fighters Project-"Aeiou"	Hikaru Azumi	Lead role	

=== TV dramas ===
Year	Title	Role	Network	Notes	Ref.
2011	Rokudenashi Blues	Yoneji Sawamura	NTV		
2012	GTO: Great Teacher Onizuka	Seiya Dojima	Fuji TV		
2012	GTO: Autumn Demon Rampage Special	Seiya Dojima	Fuji TV	2 hours special	
2012	Sugarless	Gaku Shiiba	NTV	Lead role	
2013	GTO Special 2 ~ New Year Special	Seiya Dojima	Fuji TV	2 hours special	
2013	GTO Special 3 ~ Graduation Special	Seiya Dojima	Fuji TV	2 hours special	
2014	We Are All Already Dead ♪	Ewan Ichinose	TBS	Lead role	
2015	High & Low The Sory Of S.W.O.R.D.~	Bernie	NTV	Episodes 4 and 10	
2016	High & Low Season 2	Bernie	NTV		
2016	Night Hero Naoto		TV Tokyo	Ending dance	
2019	The King of Novels	Toyotaka Yoshida	Fuji TV	Lead role	
2019	Kizoku Tanjou -Prince Of Legend-	Shintaro Ando	NTV	Lead role	
2020	M: Beloved One	Sho Rukawa	TV Asahi		
2021	Nakuna Kenshui	Ryuji Ameno	TV Asahi	Lead role	
2023	Cinderella of Midsummer	Mamoru Yamauchi	Fuji TV		

=== Web Dramas ===
Year	Title	Role	Network	Notes	Ref
2013	We are all already dead ♪	Ewan Ichinose	NOTTV	Lead role	
2018	Happy-Go-Lucky!	Takuya	GYAO!	Lead role	

=== Stageplay ===
Date	Title	Role
2010.03	Gekidan Exile Junction #1 "Night Ballet"	Yuki
2010.06	Gekidan Exile Hanagumi's 3rd show "Kill The Black"	
2010.12	Gekidan Exile Hanagumi × Kazegumi's joint show "Rokudenashi Blues"	Yoneji Sawamura
2011.09	Closet (reading) drama "Moshimo Kimi ga."	
2011.12	Closet (reading) drama "Moshimo Kimi ga. -Last Christmas"	
2020.02	Reading drama Book Act "Hero yo yasuraka ni nemure/Sleep peacefully, hero"	

=== TV shows ===
Year	Title	Network	Notes
2014	Wao	Fuji TV	
2018	Mezamashi TV	Fuji TV	Monthly Entertainment Presenter (June 2018)

=== Voice Acting ===
Year	Title	Role
2014	Mattsu to Yanma to Moburi-san 2	As himself
2017	High & Low g-sword Animation DVD Special Edition	Bernie

=== Advertisements ===
Years	Title	Ref.
2014	ABC-Mart "adidas CLIMACOOL"	
2015	Moist Diane "Extra Shine"	
2015	Samantha Vega	
2016	SoftBank "Sponavi Live"	
2016, 2017	Rohto Pharmaceutical "Mr. Oxy"	
2017	Samantha Vega × Hirunaka no Ryuusei	
2017	Youfuku no Aoyama "Lost and Found"	
2018	Samantha Thavasa Japan Limited	
2018	Youfuku no Aoyama "Aoyama Prestige Technology"	
2019	Samantha Thavasa 25th	

=== Music videos ===
Year	Artist	Title	Ref.
2011	Sandaime J Soul Brothers	Fighters	
2019	Samantha Thavasa Family	"ONE -we are one-"	

=== Other ===
Year	Title	Role	Ref.
2012	Himitsu-Goto Up / down (Shueisha Pinky Bunko)	Cover model	Up; Down

== Photobook ==
	Release date	Title	Ref.
1st	21 November 2017	Timbre	

== Producing ==
Year	Title	Artist	Ref.
2018	"Melody" (Lyric Video)	Exile	
2019	"Shinsei" (Sound production)	Generations	
