= Tetsuya (dancer) =

Japanese dancer

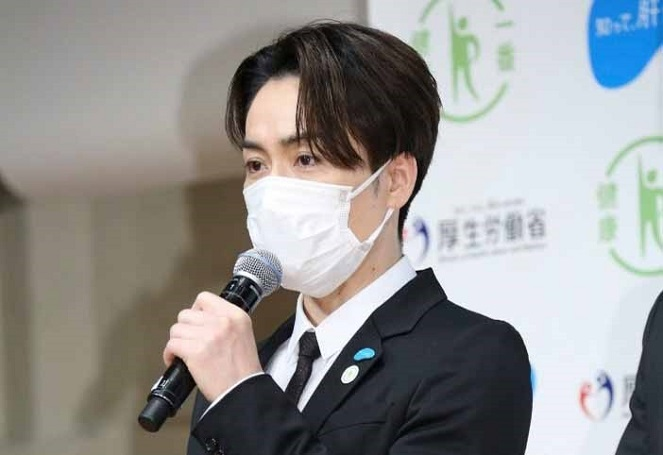
- Tetsuya in 2022
- Born: Tetsuya Tsuchida (土田 哲也, Tsuchida Tetsuya); 18 February 1981 (age 45); Yokosuka, Kanagawa, Japan
- Occupations: Dancer; actor
- Years active: 2002–
- Agent: LDH
- Notable work: Attaku No. 1; Fukuro no nezumi
- Television: Gyōretsu 48-jikan; Pandora II Kiga Rettō
- Children: 1
- Website: Official website

Tetsuya Tsuchida (土田哲也; Tsuchida Tetsuya, born February 18, 1981, in Yokosuka, Kanagawa), better known by his stage name Tetsuya and Exile Tetsuya (stylized as TETSUYA and EXILE TETSUYA), is a Japanese dancer, actor, businessman and lecturer. He is a member of Exile and Exile the Second. He was also a member of Dance Earth Party and J Soul Brothers' second generation Nidaime J Soul Brothers until their migration to Exile in 2009.

Tetsuya is represented with LDH. He is engaged in various activities in the field of dance education and has graduated with a master's degree in sport sciences from Waseda University in 2018. Furthermore, he is the director of the "EXILE Performance Institute (EPI)", the coffee brand AMAZING COFFEE and "EXPG High School".

== Early life ==
Tetsuya Tsuchida was born on February 18, 1981, in Kanagawa Prefecture, Japan. He is a Yokosuka City Elementary School and Yokosuka City Shinmei Junior High School graduate. After graduating from high school, Tetsuya went on to study agriculture in high school due to the influence of his parents who are engaged in farm work. After graduating from high school, he worked at his father's company. Tetsuya was an active swimmer for 10 years from elementary school to high school and started practicing dancing aged 19.

In 2002, Tetsuya, Tsun, and John J. O'Connor together formed the dance team poly-3. The name poly-3 was created by John deriving from the terms polyglot, polychromatic, and polyphony. Later, Kenchi Tachibana joined as a new member with other local dancers from Yokosuka. In 2004, Tetsuya appeared in Exile's stage-play HEART of GOLD ~STREET FUTURE OPERA BEAT POPS~. A year later, in 2005, he formed the dance team FULCRUM alongside Kenchi, Keiji Kuroki and others. The team lasted until 2006, when he joined the Krump team RAG POUND.

== Career ==
On January 25, 2007, he was selected as member of the second generation from the group J Soul Brothers and his stage name became TETSUYA. On May 7, 2008, he made his official debut in Nidaime J Soul Brothers with the single "WE!". The group announced their indefinite hiatus after releasing one album in 2009 and all members joined the line-up of Exile shortly after.

On August 4, 2009, it was announced that Tetsuya would make his acting debut in the Fuji TV drama Shin Oishinbo 3 Kaibara Yūzan vs Kyūkyoku Nana-ri no Samurai!.

In 2011, Tetsuya established the "EXILE Performance Institute (EPI)" and became the director of the company. He also designed the training system "E.P.I. Training".

On March 30, 2012, it was announced that he would play his first leading role in the drama Kimi to Boku to no Yakusoku (君と僕との約束; Promise Between You and Me) alongside fellow Exile member Keiji Kuroki. On July 1, 2012, Tetsuya joined the Exile sub-unit Exile The Second alongside his fellow former Nidaime J Soul Brothers members Shokichi, Nesmith, Keiji and Kenchi. In August of the same year, he was appointed as a lecturer for NHK-E's program E Dance Academy together with Exile's Üsa. It would serve as an educational program for amateurs interested in dancing and include dance lessons with children who are elementary school students and dance beginners. The public response to E Dance Academy was great, including being actually used as a reference in school classes. For this reason it was decided to become a regular program.

In 2013, he participated in Üsa's DANCE EARTH project by being part of the coed unit Dance Earth Party as a performer.

On April 29, 2015, Tetsuya became a fixed member of Dance Earth Party alongside Üsa and Dream Shizuka. On December 28 in the same year, it was announced that he would undergo surgery on his left shoulder in early 2016 due to a joint dislocation.

On October 6, 2016, he was appointed as a "Yokosuka Excitement Ambassador" alongside Kenchi Tachibana. Both being Yokosuka locals, they remained strongly attached to their hometown even after joining Exile and continuously contribute to the development of the children of the city. In the same year, Tetsuya became a visiting associate professor at Mimasaka University to examine the impact of dance on children.

On March 26, 2018, Tetsuya graduated from Waseda University Graduate School of Sports Sciences with a master's degree after completing a one-year master's program. He published his master's thesis on the theme of "The present situation and prescription of modern rhythm dance classes at junior high schools after the mandatory education ~Class design and auxiliary video teaching materials for students who enjoy and teachers who have difficulties in teaching~". His master's thesis won the Excellent Paper Award of his university. On December 4 in the same year, all Dance Earth Party members announced the group's indefinite hiatus. Tetsuya would go on with his activities as a member of Exile and Exile The Second.

On May 13, 2019, it was revealed that he was diagnosed with bilateral patellar subluxation syndrome and would be halting his activities as performer in order to receive treatment and fully recover. On September 27 in the same year, it was announced that he would return as an instructor on E Dance Academy and thus resume his activities as a performer. On November 25, it was announced during a press conference that he was appointed as the president of "EXPG High School", a joint project between EXPG Studio and the correspondence school corporation Kadokawa Dwango Gakuen "N Prep-School" which would begin in April 2020. On December 23, Tetsuya will release his first business book titled Mitsuami Raifu (三つ編みライフ; Braid Life). The title of the book was chosen to represent his work in three completely different fields: dance, research and coffee business, combining them together in a "braid" style as his profession.

== Personal life ==
On March 5, 2019, it was announced via Exile related websites and news outlets that Tetsuya registered his marriage to a 37-year-old non-celebrity woman after 3 years of dating. It was also revealed the couple were expecting their first child that would be born around summer 2019. This made him the 6th married Exile member joining Hiro, Matsu, Makidai, Üsa and Takahiro and 5th to have a child. On August 20, 2019, Tetsuya revealed at the press conference for MACHI cafe's Amazing Ice Caramel Latte that his first child was born healthy and safely.

== Participating groups ==
Name	Period of time	Ref.
Poly-3	2002 – unknown	
Fulcrum	2005 – 2006	
Rag Pound	2006 – unknown	
Nidaime J Soul Brothers	25 January 2007 – 1 March 2009	
Exile	1 March 2009 –	
Exile The Second	2012 –	
Dance Earth Party	2013 – 2018	

== Filmography ==
※His roles in bold are his starring works

=== Stage ===
Year	Title	Role	Notes	Ref.
2004	Heart of Gold –Street Future Opera Beat Pops–			
2008	Crown Nemuranai Yoru no Hate ni...			
2009	Attaku No. 1	Chief of Staff Sergeant Katsushiro Kashida, **Chief of Staff Sergeant Katsumori**		
2010	Fukuro no nezumi	**Ichitato Segawa**		
2010	Night Ballet	**Oga**		
2011	Moshimo Kimi ga.	**Yumoto**		
2012	Love Letters 2012 22nd Anniversary	Andy		
2013	Dance Earth: Seimei no Kodō	**Salta**		
2013	Sadako: Tanjō Hiwa		Voice cast	
2014	Dance Earth: Changes	Inaba		

=== TV dramas ===
Year	Title	Role	Network	Notes	Ref.
2009	Shin Oishinbo 3 Kaibara Yūzan vs Kyūkyoku Nana-ri no Samurai!	Keiichi Hiratsuki	Fuji TV		
2009	Gyōretsu 48-jikan	Akio Someya	NHK-G		
2010	Pandora II Kiga Rettō	Shunsuke Isoda	WOWOW		
2010	Keiji Teinen	Takashi Takagi	BS Asahi	Episode 9	
2011	Kazoku Hōtei	Yoshihiro Onodera	BS Asahi		
2011	Ōsama no Ie	Stationary	BS Asahi	Episode 9	
2012	Counter no futari	**Yuichi Akiba**	TwellV	Episode 6	

=== Internet dramas ===
Year	Title	Role	Website	Ref.
2012	Kimi to Boku to no Yakusoku	**Yohei Akiyama**	Bee TV	

=== Films ===
Year	Title	Ref.
2006	Backdancers!	
2016	Exile University: Anata no Yume wa nandesu ka?	

=== TV programmes ===
Year	Title	Network	Notes	Ref.
2011	EXILE FOR JAPAN Yume no Chikara	Fuji TV		
2012	Mecha-Mecha Iketeru!	Fuji TV	"Hisshū Dance: Kaere ma Step" lecturer	
2014	Honō no Taiiku-kai TV	TBS	Swimmer	
2012–present	E Dance Academy	NHK-E	Lecturer	

=== Advertisements ===
Year	Title	Ref.
2011	Recruit Hot Pepper Gourmet	
2012	Fujitsu Arrows	
2012	Angfa "Scalp D"	
2013	Angfa "Scalp D Beaute Pure Free Eye Rush"	
2013	Hisamitsu Pharmaceutical "Air Salon Path"	
2013	The Coca-Cola Company Coca-Cola Zero	
2013	Daiichi Kosho Company "Smart Dam"	
2015	Yōfuku no Aoyama	
2016	SoftBank Group "Sponach Live"	
2016	Washin "UTMO"	

=== Radio ===
Year	Title	Network
2013	Radio Mashup	FM Yokohama

=== Magazine and newspaper serializations ===
Year	Title	Notes	Ref.
2012	Tokyo Headline "Dance no Michi"	Monthly series	
2012	Get Navi "Training 360"		
2013	Yokohama Walker "Hamaxile"		
2017	2nd		

=== Others ===
Year	Title	Notes	Ref.
2015	Furusato Matsuri Tokyo: Nihon no Matsuri furusato no Aji	Japanese festival navigator	
2016	Yokosuka Excitement Ambassador		
2018	FUN+WALK PROJECT Ambassador		

== Productions ==
Year	Title	Notes	Ref.
2012	Training programme "Adi Pure Training"	Adidas global trainer and co-devised	
2014	Dance performance shoes "DP.01"	Joint developed with Adidas	
2015	Coffee shop "Amazing Coffee"		
2016	Tipness dance fitness programme "Rhythm Workout"	Supervisor	

== Awards ==
Year	Award	Ref.
2013	Sleep of the Year 2013 "Best Nem List"	
