= Shokichi =

Japanese singer (born 1985)

Exile Shokichi 八木 将吉
- Also known as: Shokichi, Exile Shokichi
- Born: Shokichi Yagi; 3 October 1985 (age 40); Tomakomai, Hokkaido, Japan
- Origin: Japan
- Genres: J-pop; contemporary R&B; hip hop
- Occupations: Singer; dancer; lyricist; composer
- Years active: 2004–present
- Label: Rhythm Zone
- Website: Official website

Shokichi Yagi (八木 将吉 Yagi Shōkichi; born October 3, 1985, in Tomakomai, Hokkaido), better known by his stage name Shokichi and Exile Shokichi (stylized as SHOKICHI and EXILE SHOKICHI), is a Japanese singer, dancer, songwriter, composer and actor. He is a vocalist and performer of Exile and Exile The Second. He was also a member of J Soul Brothers' second generation Nidaime J Soul Brothers until their migration to Exile in 2009.

Shokichi debuted as a soloist with the single "Back To The Future" on June 14, 2014. For his solo activities he uses the stage name Exile Shokichi.

== Biography ==
Shokichi Yagi was born on October 3, 1985, in Tomakomai, Hokkaido (Japan). He has a younger brother, Masayasu Yagi, who is an actor, singer and member of Gekidan Exile.

In July 2006 Shokichi participated in the EXILE VOCAL BATTLE AUDITION 2006 ~ASIAN DREAM~, but failed. After that, he also failed the COLOR audition, which led him to the decision to attend the EXPG (Exile Professional Gym), LDH's talent academy. This finally made it possible for him to join Nidaime J Soul Brothers in 2007. The group announced their indefinite hiatus after releasing one album in 2009 and all members joined the line-up of Exile shortly after.

In 2012, Shokichi joined the Exile sub-unit Exile The Second alongside his fellow former Nidaime J Soul Brothers members Nesmith, Kenchi, Keiji and Tetsuya.

In 2013, he played his first leading role in the Nippon TV drama Frenemy: Dobunezumi no Machi alongside Exile/Sandaime J Soul Brothers member Naoto.

On June 14, 2014, he debuted as a soloist with the single "BACK TO THE FUTURE". On October 22, Shokichi released his 2nd single "The One". At the end of the year he was invited to perform at the Asia Song Festival 2014 in South Korea together with DJ Hal.

On July 22, 2015, he released his 3rd single "Don't Stop the Music". The B-side tracks featured several of his label mates, such as CrazyBoy on "Anytime" and PKCZ on "Y.L.S.S.". Shortly after on August 16, Shokichi performed for the first time at Summer Sonic 2015 in Osaka. Additionally, the title track of his 4th single "IGNITION" was used as the theme song for the Japanese release of the American movie The Transporter Refueled which was released on October 24.

On April 27, 2016, Shokichi released his first solo album, titled THE FUTURE.
On May 14, 2018 it was announced that Exile The Second's song "Hi Noboru Hikari ni ~ Pray for Now ~ " (日昇る光に ～Pray for Now～; Sunlight rising to Pray for Now), written by Shokichi, was chosen as the official support song for the Japanese Judo Federation during the 2020 Tokyo Olympics. On July 16, he performed at DANCE EARTH FESTIVAL 2018 ～SPLASH SUMMER～, a festival hosted by LDH. In the same month, he established and started producing his own label KOMA DOGG. This project is hosted by him at LDH Music & Publishing, LDH's own record label. Shortly after he participated in another festival, DOBERMAN INFINITY presents D.Island 2018.

On October 3, 2018, his 33rd birthday, Shokichi released his 6th single "Futen Boyz". The music video for the title track features him and his brother Masayasu Yagi, who is also appearing in the movie DTC - Yukemuri Junjō-hen - from HiGH& LOW (DTC -湯けむり純情篇- from HiGH＆LOW) for which this track is used as the theme song. On December 15, 2018, he released his first photo book titled BYAKUYA. The first press edition included a new song with the same title, "Byakuya" (白夜; White Night).

On February 12, 2019 it was announced that Shokichi would release his second album and hold the first solo arena tour in his career. The release of his second album 1114, thoroughly composed and written by himself, was set for May 15 with the title representing the number of days since the release of his first album THE FUTURE. His tour EXILE SHOKICHI LIVE TOUR 2019"UNDERDOGG" went from June 29 to September 15 with 8 performances in 6 cities. Shokichi also composed the debut track of Ballistik Boyz from Exile Tribe, "Tenhane -1000%-" (テンハネ -1000%-) in the same year.

== Business ==
=== Koma Dogg ===
KOMA DOGG is Shokichi's own label which he established in July 2018. He started this project because he wants to contribute to LDH with music by becoming a representative producer of the company. Furthermore, he enjoys collaborating with various artists and likes to challenge himself. The goal of his label is to let musicians be able to express themselves freely, pursue creativity and create an enjoyable production environment. Since its establishment, the label has signed Japanese artists such as Salu and Kodai Sato. Shokichi stated his next step is to increase the number of artists even more.

== Participating groups ==
Name	Period of time	Ref.
Jack Pot	2004	
symphony	2005 – unknown	
Nidaime J Soul Brothers	25 January 2007 – 1 March 2009	
Exile	1 March 2009 – present	
Exile The Second	1 July 2012 – present	

== Discography ==
=== Singles ===
Year	Title	Ranking		Ref.
Year	Title	Oricon	Billboard Japan	Ref.
2014	BACK TO THE FUTURE	2	10	
2014	The One	5	9	
2015	Don't Stop the Music	4	29	
2015	IGNITION	6	29	
2018	Underdog	7	18	
2018	Futen Boyz	8	28	

=== Digital Singles ===
Year	Title	Ranking	Ref.
Year	Title	Billboard Japan	Ref.
2017	Back 2U	-	
2019	Kimi ni Au Tame ni Boku wa Umaretekitanda (君に会うために僕は生まれてきたんだ)	-	
2019	Psychedelic Romance (サイケデリックロマンス)	-	

=== Albums ===
Year	Title	Ranking		Ref.
Year	Title	Oricon	Billboard Japan	Ref.
2016	The Future	5	4	
2019	1114	3	2	

=== Covers ===
Title	Notes
Just the Two of Us	Grover Washington Jr. cover; recorded in the cover album Exile Cover

=== Collaboration single ===
date	title	Preparation	Ranking
2020oct7	KING&KING	EXILE SHOKICHI×CrazyBoy	15
2020dec25	GET IT ON	EXILE SHOKICHI×CrazyBoy	
2020nov14	Pull Up	EXILE SHOKICHI×CrazyBoy	

=== Participating works ===
Year	Song	Artist	Album	Notes	Ref.
2014	Glory	Sandaime J Soul Brothers	C.O.S.M.O.S.		
2014	#Hotline	Doberman Infinity	#PRLG		
2014	Loveholic	Doberman Infinity	#PRLG	(Note: Alternate version of the song "Loveholic (Exile Shokichi feat. Doberman Infinity).)	
2014	+α	Mhiro	Featuring Best "+α"		
2015	Daydream	Akiko Wada	Wadasoul		
2016	Whiteout	Various artists	High & Low Original Best Album		
2017	Diamond Dust	Kodai Sato	Snow Globe		
2017	Fight Club	Miyavi	SAMURAI SESSIONS vol.2		
2018	Untitled	Doberman Infinity	OFF ROAD		
2018	Double Play Remix	CrazyBoy	NEOTOKYO IV EP		
2018	Lights Off	CrazyBoy	NEOTOKYO FOREVER		
2018	Good Vibes Only	Salu			
2018	Never Say Goodbye	Sway	UNCHAINED		
2018	Furui Nikki (古い日記)	Various artists	AKKO GA OMAKASE -WADA AKIKO 50 SHUUNEN KINEN TRIBUTE ALBUM(アッコがおまかせ ～和田アキ子 50周年記念 トリビュート・アルバム～)		
2019	白濁 Collaboration with EXILE SHOKICHI	sukekiyo	INFINITUM（公式通販限定盤）		
2019	SUPERSTAR	Various artists	ANOTHER VOICE -Full Of Harmony Tribute Album-		
2019	THE FOOL	EXILE AKIRA	THE FOOL MOVIE 2 〜THE FOOLS〜		
2020	DANCE PARTY Part 2〜Music Bird〜				
2020	LEMON FRIDAY	EXILE SHOKICHI & DEEP SQUAD			
2021	Fridays Fantasy feat. EXILE SHOKICHI, SALU	SIMON & YMG	TRY		

=== Compositions and lyrics ===
Song	Artist	Recorded	Notes	Ref.
Everlasting Song	Exile	Album Exile Japan	Written and composed	
Beautiful Life	Exile	Album Exile Japan	Wrote lyrics, co-written with Atsushi	
PARTY ALL NIGHT ～STAR OF WISH～	Exile	Album Star of Wish	Wrote lyrics, co-written with Akira	
STEP UP	Exile	Album Star of Wish	Co-produced with Jay'ed and The Stereotypes	
Back To The Future	Shokichi	Single "Back To The Future"	Wrote lyrics, co-written with Verbal and Sway	
The Anthem	Shokichi	Single "Back To The Future"	Written and composed, co-composed with Nakkid and Doberman Inc, co-written with Doberman Inc, Sway and Elly	
Enrai	Shokichi	Single "Back To The Future"	Wrote lyrics	
Hello	Shokichi	Single "Back To The Future"	Written and composed	
The One	Shokichi	Single "The One"	Written and composed, co-composed with Sunny Boy	
Loveholic	Shokichi	Single "The One"	Wrote lyrics, co-written with Kubo-C, GS, P-Cho, Sway, and Kazuki	
Here We Go	Shokichi	Single "The One"	Written and composed, co-composed with Sky Beatz and Dexpistols	
Don't Stop the Music	Shokichi	Single "Don't Stop the Music"	Wrote lyrics	
Freaky Cheeky	Shokichi	Single "Don't Stop the Music"	Written and composed, co-written with Sakura, co-composed with T.Kura-Sakura	
Anytime	Shokichi	Single "Don't Stop the Music"	Written and composed, co-written with Crazyboy, co-composed with Nakkid	
Y.L.S.S.	Shokichi	Single "Don't Stop the Music"	Written and composed, co-written with Verbal, co-composed with Lucas Valentine (Ambushr)	
Ignition	Shokichi	Single "Ignition"	Written and composed, co-written with Amon Hayashi, co-composed by Amon Hayashi and Nao the Laiza	
Last Song	Shokichi	Single "Ignition"	Wrote lyrics	
Ao no Hibi	Shokichi	Single "Ignition"	Written and composed, co-composed with D&H	
Machine Gun Funk	Shokichi	Album The Future	Written and composed, co-composed with Sky Beatz	
Rock City	Shokichi	Album The Future	Co-written with Sway	
You are Beautiful	Shokichi	Album The Future	Written and composed, co-composed with Uta	
A	Shokichi	Album The Future	Wrote lyrics	
Without You (Interlude)	Shokichi	Album The Future	Written and composed, co-composed with Sky Beatz	
Future	Shokichi	Album The Future	Written and composed, co-composed with T-SK	
Chaos	Exile The Second	Single "Think 'Bout It!"	Written and composed, co-composed with Sky Beatz, Fast Lane and Mats Lie Skare	
Rock Star	Exile The Second	Single "Think 'Bout It!"	Wrote lyrics	
Survivors	Exile The Second	Single "Survivors feat. DJ Makidai from Exile/Pride"	Wrote lyrics	
Lost In Time	Exile The Second	Single "Survivors feat. DJ Makidai from Exile/Pride"	Wrote lyrics	
Bump Up	Exile The Second	Single "Survivors feat. DJ Makidai from Exile/Pride"	Wrote lyrics, co-written with P-Cho, GS, Kubo-C and Tomogen	
Beginning Of The Second Age	Exile The Second	Album The II Age	Wrote Lyrics	
Missing You	Exile The Second	Album The II Age	Written and composed, co-composed with Sky Beatz and Fast Lane	
Signal Fire	Exile The Second	Album The II Age	Wrote lyrics, co-written with Sway	
Yeah!! Yeah!! Yeah!!	Exile The Second	Single "Yeah!! Yeah!! Yeah!!"	Wrote lyrics	
Going Crazy	Exile The Second	Single "Yeah!! Yeah!! Yeah!!"	Wrote lyrics	
Wild Wild Wild	Exile The Second	Single "Wild Wild Wild"	Wrote lyrics	
Ray	Exile The Second	Single "Wild Wild Wild"	Written and composed, co-composed with Henrik Nordenback, Sirius and Big-F	
Glory	Sandaime J Soul Brothers	Single "C.O.S.M.O.S."	Wrote lyrics, co-written with Amon Hayashi	
#Hotline	Doberman Infinity	Album #PRLG	Written and composed, co-written with Elly, Kubo-C, GS, P-Cho and Sway, co-composed with Nakkid, Elly, Kubo-C, GS, P-Cho and Sway	
Loveholic	Doberman Infinity	Album #PRLG	Alternate version of "Loveholic (Exile Shokichi feat. Doberman Infinity)"	
Love U Down	Doberman Infinity	Album The Line	Written and composed, co-written with Sky Beatz-Shikata-Chris Hope-J Faith	
Don't Stop The Music	DEEP	Single "Last Goodbye"	Wrote lyrics	
Intro –Love again–	DEEP	Album Love Light	Written and composed	
Higher Ground	Exile Tribe	Album High & Low Original Best Album/Various artists	Written and composed, co-written with Dimitri Thivaios, Michael Thivaios, Willem van Hanegem, Ward van der Harst, Chris Hope, Shikata, Maria Marcus, Masaya Wada and Crazyboy	
ASOBO!	Exile The Second	Album High & Low Original Best Album/Various artists	Wrote lyrics, co-written with Verbal, Nesmith, and Far East Movement (Kevin Nishimura-James Roh-Virman Coquia)	
Diamond Dust	Kodai Sato	Single "Snow Globe"	Wrote lyrics	

=== Tie-up ===
Song	Tie-up	Ref.
Back To The Future	Onegai! Ranking May 2014 ending theme	
The One	Recruit Zexy advert song	
The One	Onegai! Ranking October 2014 ending theme	
Loveholic	Angfa "Scalp D" advert song	
Don't Stop the Music	Sukkiri!! July 2015 ending theme	
Ignition	The Transporter Refueled Japanese theme song	
Freaky Cheeky	Exile Tribe Otoko Tabi Season III theme song	
Rock City	Yōfuku no Aoyama "Natsu Suits" advert song	
Whiteout	High & Low: The Story of S.W.O.R.D. insert song	

== Filmography ==
=== TV programmes ===
Year	Title	Network	Notes	Ref.
2012	EX-Lounge	TBS	MC	
2013	Massugu ni Chikako, Yume e	STV	Navigator	
2014	Dosanko Wide 179	STV	"Exile Shokichi mirai no Sora" mirai Ōen Caster; irregular appearances	
2014–present	Exile Tribe Otoko Tabi (EXILE TRIBE 男旅)	UHB	travelog in Hokkaido with 4 other members of Exile Tribe	

=== TV dramas ===
Year	Title	Role	Network	Notes
2012	Sugarless	Itaru Aramaki / Shake	NTV	
2013	Frenemy: Dobunezumi no Machi	Natsuki Morishita	NTV	Lead role

=== Advertisements ===
Year	Title	Ref.
2013	Daiichi Kosho Company "Smart Dam"	
2014	Recruit Zexy	
2014	AOYAMA PRESTIGE TECHNOLOGY "Soul Man"	
2014	Angfa "Scalp D"	
2014	beats by dr. re	
2015	Suntory The Malts	
2016	Yōfuku no Aoyama "Natsu Suits"	

=== Music videos ===
Year	Title	Artist	Ref.
2017	I Got a Dream	BIGZAM	
2018	RED SOUL BLUE DRAGON	Red Diamond Dogs	

== Live ==
Year	Title	Ref.
2012	VBA Live Tour 2012 Vocal Battle Stage	
2014	Vocal Battle Audition Presents "Vocal Battle Stage 2014"	
2019	Exile Shokichi Live Tour 2019 "UNDERDOGG"	

== Photobook ==
Release date	Title	Ref.
December 15, 2018	BYAKUYA	
