= Elly (dancer) =

Japanese dancer and rapper (born 1987)

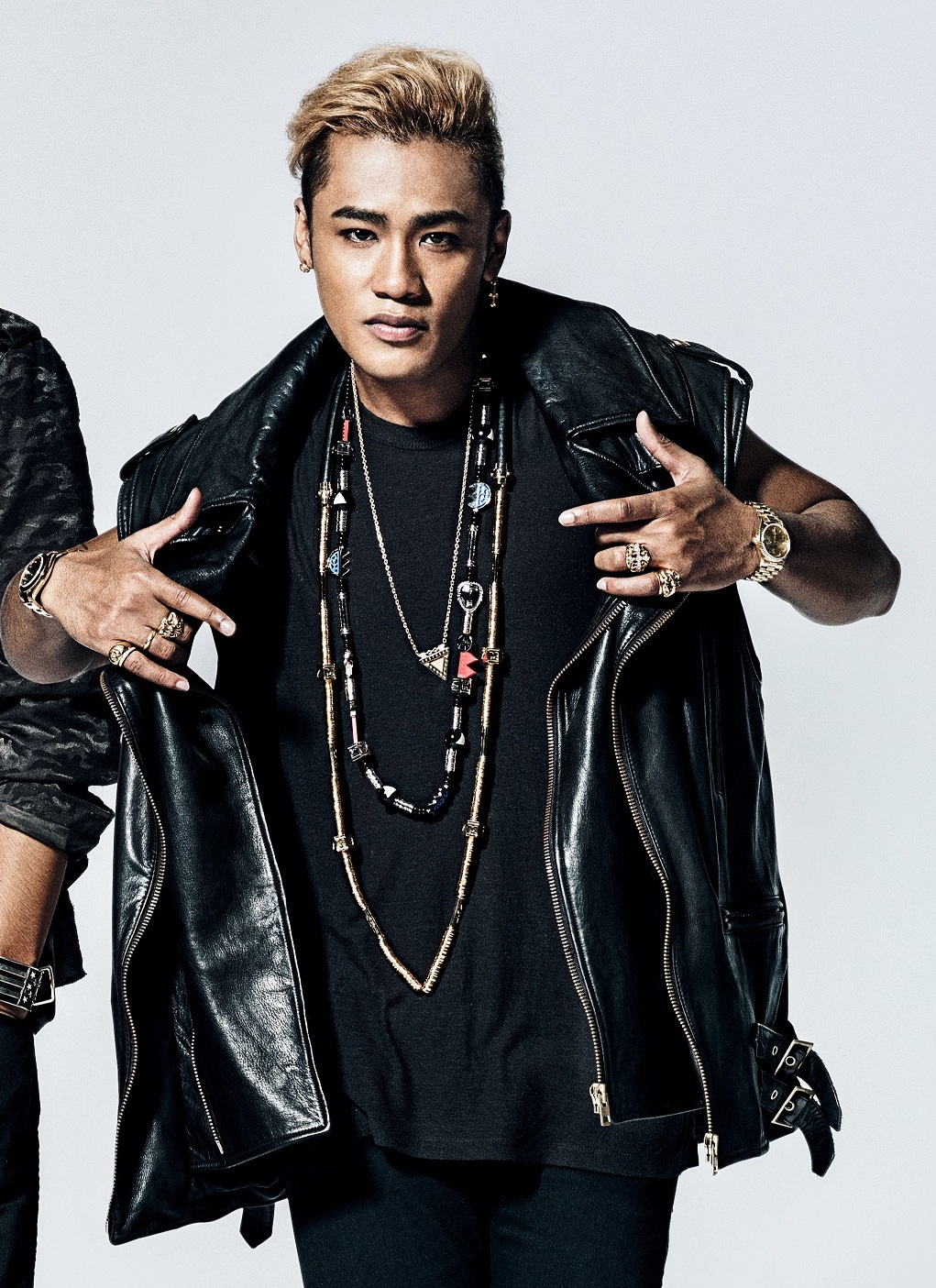

Background information
- Also known as: CRAZYBOY; CrazyBoy
- Born: Koya Rosado Elliott; September 21, 1987 (age 39); Misawa, Aomori, Japan
- Genres: J-pop; Hip hop
- Occupations: Dancer; rapper
- Years active: 2010–
- Labels: rhythm zone (2017 - 2018); LDH MUSIC (2019 - present)
- Website: www.ldh.co.jp/eng/management/elly/

Koya Rosado Elliott (エリオット・ロシャード・昂矢 Eriotto Roshādo Kōya; born September 21, 1987), better known by his stage name Elly (stylized as ELLY), is a Japanese dancer and rapper. He is a performer(dancer) of J-Pop dance and vocal group Sandaime J Soul Brothers and a former member of Gekidan Exile.

For his solo career as a rapper he uses the stage name CrazyBoy. He debuted as a soloist in collaboration with Exile Shokichi in the song "THE ANTHEM" on June 4, 2014, and released his first solo album NEOTOKYO FOREVER on July 4, 2018. As a member of Sandaime J Soul Brothers, he has received the Japan Record Awards twice and he has choreographed some of the most famous dances for his group, including the famous "Runningman" dance of R.Y.U.S.E.I. He is also an enthusiastic Fortnite player, hoping to promote e-sports in Japan.

Elly's father is former OPBF Super Welterweight Champion Carlos Elliott and his younger brother, Likiya, is also a dancer and leader of the J-pop dance and vocal group The Rampage from Exile Tribe.

== Early life ==
Elly was born Koya Rosado Elliott on September 21, 1987 in Misawa, Aomori Prefecture to a Japanese mother and an African-American father. His father is former OPBF's Super Welterweight Champion Carlos Elliott and his younger brother, Likiya, later followed the example of Elly and became a dancer too. When he was in junior high school, his friends gave him the nickname "ELLY", which is short for his surname Elliott, and he continued to use "ELLY" as his stage name. Elly had played baseball since he was young and was the catcher and the fourth player in the batting order (the cleanup hitter, often the one with the most power and ability to drive in runs with extra-base hits) in his high school baseball team. After losing to Hachinohe Gakuin Kosei High School in the Quarter-final of the Regional High School Summer Baseball Tournament in his third year, Elly's dream to play in Koshien ended. One of his opponents in this crucial game was Sakamoto Hayato, who continued to become a professional baseball player and still remembered Elly as his opponent when the two met after they both earned fame in different fields. Elly entered Tokyo University of Agriculture with a baseball scholarship, hoping to become a professional baseball player after his graduation.

Elly began to dance and produce music at a very young age. Since there is an American Military Camp in his hometown Misawa, he grew up in a city with much influence from American culture. He bought a set of DJ equipment with his pocket money when he was still a sixth-grade elementary school student, learned how to DJ from the manager of the local CD shops and started to rap soon after in junior high. In high school, he started dancing after seeing B2K's film You got served. He was amazed by the dancers in the movie, and learned his first dance moves by imitating the dances from the film with his brother. After he moved to Tokyo to attend university, he continued to practice dancing at night after a day of baseball practice. It was during these busy days when he saw the performance of the dance team "BASE HEADS" at a club in Shibuya, that he decided he wanted to be a dancer just like them at the very moment. As a result, he quit university and baseball in the second year of his studies, chasing his dream to become a professional dancer.

== Career ==
=== 2007-2010: Early Days: The Team and Gekidan Exile ===
Elly formed the Hip-Hop dance crew THE TEAM in 2007, which marked his debut in the professional dance world. Apart from performing at clubs and events, he also appeared as a backup-dancer in the music videos of singers like Toshinobu Kubota and Meisa Kuroki. In March 2010, Elly was scouted by EXPG Studio (a talent school run by LDH) to perform in Gekidan Exile's play NIGHT BALLET as a guest dancer. He joined the actor group Gekidan Exile Kazegumi (the team of wind) in April of the same year, officially joining LDH at the same time while remaining hopeful about becoming part of one of their dance and vocal groups in the future. In May 2010, he performed in Gekidan Exile's 4th play DANCE EARTH ~Negai~.

=== 2010-present: Sandaime J Soul Brothers ===
On July 19, 2010, when LDH announced that they wanted to revive dance and vocal group J Soul Brothers and form Sandaime J Soul Brothers, Elly was selected as the first member (performer) of the new group, joining Naoto and Naoki Kobayashi, who were also members of the previous J Soul Brothers line-up. On September 27, Elly made his first public appearance as a performer of Sandaime J Soul Brothers during the Fantasy Goya-sai: Exile Tamashī (FANTASY後夜祭～EXILE魂～; FANTASY Late Night Festival ~EXILE Soul~) live performance from Exile at Toyota Stadium. On November 10, he made his major debut as a member of Sandaime J Soul Brothers as the group released their debut single, "Best Friend's Girl", debuting at number three on the Oricon Singles Chart. On July 19, 2011, He officially withdrew from Gekidan Exile.

In August 2012, Sandaime J Soul Brothers' seventh single "0 ~Zero~" which included their major hit "Hanabi", was released and became their first single to sell over 100.000 copies. Elly choreographed the dance for "Hanabi", which marked the first time he choreographed for his group. At the end of the year, Elly and his group appeared on the stage of NHK Kohaku Uta Gassen for the first time, performing their single "Hanabi".

With 2014 becoming an important year for Sandaime J Soul Brothers, Elly gained greater fame alongside his group. On April 12, the movie Crows Explode was released, in which he made his acting debut by playing Suzuran's new first-year boss Yamashita Gohei. He also started to become active as a rapper, featuring in Exile Shokichi's song "THE ANTHEM", which was released on June 4. On June 25, Sandaime J Soul Brothers' major hit "R.Y.U.S.E.I." was released. The song topped the Oricon Singles Charts at number one, selling 162.174 copies in the first week of its release. Additionally, Elly's choreography, especially the "running man" dance move during the chorus, became a national fever. The song also won Sandaime J Soul Brothers the Japan Record Award and skyrocketed the group to mainstream success.

On January 28, 2015, Sandaime J Soul Brothers released their fifth album, PLANET SEVEN, which sold 508 thousand copies in the first week after its release. He also landed his first leading role in the action film Trash, which was released on October 24.

On March 30, 2016, Sandaime J Soul Brothers released their 6th album, THE JSB LEGACY. It included "Feel So Alive", the first song of the group Elly took part in as rapper. Even though his voice began to appear in the songs of Sandaime J Soul Brothers more often after that, he continued to be simply be referred to as a performer in the group, not a vocalist. On April 23, the second season of the drama High&Low: The Story of S.W.O.R.D. was broadcast, which is part of the action and music franchise produced by the LDH. Elly plays ICE, a former mercenary and the leader of MIGHTY WARRIORS. As the High&Low franchise continued and more films, concerts, games and shows were produced in the following years, Elly continued to reprise his role in those follow-ups.

In 2018, on a program of LDH TV, the exclusive members-only streaming service of LDH, Elly challenged himself to be a Record producer. Together with Sandaime J Soul Brothers' vocalist Hiroomi Tosaka, he produced singer CRAZY SHIKAKKEI ("Crazy Quadrilateral") as rapper adviser and record producer. CRAZY SHIKAKKEI is the alias used by Masayasu Yagi in this "Super Star Project", and "WANAWANA", the first single of CRAZY SHIKAKKEI, was released on October 19, 2018, debuting at number one on downloading charts.

=== 2016-present: CrazyBoy ===
For LDH, a management company that focuses on producing dance and vocal groups, there used to be a strict difference between vocalists who sing and performers who dance in their groups (though it has become common for vocalists to follow the choreography too). Elly entered LDH as a performer but never gave up his love for Rap and Hip Hop and tried to produce music on his own. To get support from his company and debut as a rapper, he created his own albums and handed them out to the staff and Hiro, the CEO of LDH, showing them what kind of music he could make and asked for advice. He also got the support from his fellow Sandaime J Soul Brothers group mates and other members of Exile Tribe. In conclusion, Elly successfully debuted as a rapper in collaboration with Exile Shokichi in the single "THE ANTHEM" on June 4, 2014, still under the name of Elly. After the success of "THE ANTHEM", his solo project as a rapper was slowly approved by the company and finally given a go. Since then it has become more common for performers in LDH's groups to follow his example and rap.

After Elly was featured as a rapper in Sandaime J Soul Brothers' track "Feel So Alive" in 2016, he officially started to use CRAZYBOY as his rapper alias. He explained that he gave himself this name because he has always been given comments such as "you certainly got crazy ideas" by people around him and because he likes the idea that "crazy" can mean "cool" in L.A. Besides, he also wants to live up to the principle of "never forget the pure heart of a boy and fight on". As a result, he combined the words "Crazy" and "Boy" and called himself CRAZYBOY.

As CRAZYBOY, Elly began to made guest appearances in the works of other famous musicians. He joined ANARCHY in producing his new song, "HELLA RICH feat. CRAZYBOY", which was released in July 2016. His collaboration with Dancehall Reggae group Mighty Crown "Around The World" was released shortly after in the same month.

On February 24, 2017, Elly released his first mini-album NEOTOKYO EP as CRAZYBOY, earning the #1 spot on the weekly music downloading charts of four major media-service providers in Japan. His second mini-album NEOTOKYO II EP was released on July 7, and a DVD/CD package with recorded live performances, music videos and songs titled NEOTOKYO WORLD was released on September 21.

On January 19, 2018, he released his third mini-album NEOTOKYO III EP. In February, he joined Snoop Dogg, PKCZ and Yultron in producing the international collaboration "BOW DOWN FT. CRAZY BOY from EXILE TRIBE". After the release of his fourth mini-album NEOTOKYO IV EP on April 27, his first "Best of" album NEOTOKYO FOREVER was released on July 4. To conclude his solo activities in 2018, Elly went on his first solo tour CRAZYBOY presents NEOTOKYO ～THE PRIVATE PARTY 2018～ from July 9–27.

On July 3, 2019, Elly performed in Los Angeles for the first time in his career, at OTAQUEST LIVE. This music festival aims at bringing Japanese pop music to America. On June 22, it was announced that Elly had migrated record labels from Rhythm Zone to LDH MUSIC for his solo activities. It was also announced that his rapper alias, CRAZYBOY, was updated to CrazyBoy. He also made a change to his personal logo as a rapper. On August 23, Elly released his first digital single, "PINK DIAMOND". On September 12, it was announced that Elly would feature on the Japanese version of Jessica Jung's new single "Call Me Before You Sleep", aiming to be released on October 19. A month after the release of his first digital single, Elly released his second one "PINK DIAMOND Part2" which acts as a sequel on September 21. On September 26 it was announced that he would release his first physical single "DONNA???" on November 13. Accompanying the release, he would also hold a national high-touch event tour.

On February 27, 2020, it was announced that a special live Exile Shokichi vs CrazyBoy "KING&KING" would be held in the Yokohama Arena on May 27 as part of the Sandaime J SOUL BROTHERS from EXILE TRIBE 10th ANNIVERSARY PROJECT, while a collaboration single would also be released. Due to the COVID-19 pandemic, the special live was announced to be canceled on June 6. On July 24, the KING＆KING project held a special media event in Tokyo, announcing that a single KING＆KING by Exile Shokichi vs CrazyBoy would be released on October 7. On December 24, Exile Shokichi and CrazyBoy were announced to be the ambassador of the professional dance league D.LEAGUE.

On January 3, 2021, it was announced that CrazyBoy would release two singles, OH and Amnesia on February 27, with a tilted song "OH" produced in collaboration with Shota Shimizu and OZworld.

== Personal life ==
=== Family ===
Elly's father is former OPBF's Super Welterweight Champion Carlos Elliott and his mother is a Japanese woman. He has a younger brother, Likiya, who is a dancer and the leader of the J-pop group THE RAMPAGE from EXILE TRIBE. He also has a younger sister.

In 2018, Elly dedicated the song "This is for MAMA" to his mother to express his love and gratitude for her. The music video of this song mainly consists of private footage from Elly and his family from his childhood.

On October 27, 2020, his longtime girlfriend, MEGBABY, gave birth to his first child, a boy.

=== E-Sports ===
Elly became an enthusiastic Fortnite player in around 2018. His game account is "Riteirurō no Sonchooo" (リテイルローの村長)", which means The Village Headman of Riteirurō. He also built a small game team with friends, for example Reina Washio, a member of E-girls and Flower who calls herself "Riteirurō no Cinderella" (リテイルローのシンデレラ, Cinderella of Riteirurō), Takahide Suzuki, a member of The Rampage from Exile Tribe who named himself "Riteirurō no moto abatā" (リテイルローの元アバター, Former Avatar of Riteirurō), Ryusei Kainuma, a member of Ballistik Boyz from Exile Tribe who calls himself "Riteirurō no CoCo" (リテイルローのCoCo, CoCo of Riteirurō) and professional baseball player Louis Okoye, who named himself "Riteirurō no kankō-sha" (リテイルローの観光者, The Tourist in Riteirurō). He also became friends with Japanese Fortnite Pro Gaming Team CRAZY Raccoon, and would sometimes train with them together. In 2019, he opened his own channel on YouTube and began to live-stream his Fortnite game-plays.

Elly took part in a few e-sports event for Fortnite. On January 27, 2019, Elly teamed up with CRAZY Raccoon's UyuRiru and took part in Fortnite Summer Smash at the Australian Open's Pro-Am Duos event. On June 16, he teamed up with CRAZY Raccoon's Scarlet and took part in Fortnite Summer Block Party's celebrity Pro-Am of 2019. On July 26, he took part in Fortnite World Cup's Pro-Am with professional Fortnite player Neckokun. Their duo ranked 27th, winning 20 thousand dollars. Elly donated his cut, 10 thousand dollars, to the reconstruction after the 2011 Tōhoku earthquake and tsunami. On February 1, 2020, he was part of the Japanese team at the AO Summer Smash 2020 hosted by the Australian Open alongside professional gamer Ruri and influencer NEKO. The trio finished 8th place overall in the tournament. Elly, who won 3 thousand dollars, donated all of his prize money to the Australian Red Cross to support the combat against the Bushfires in Australia.

== Discography ==
=== Singles ===
Year	Title	Release Date	Peak Positions		Sales
Year	Title	Release Date	Oricon JPN	Hot 100	Sales
2019	DONNA???	November 13	2	15	
2021	OH (feat. Shota Shimizu & OZworld)	February 24	59	—	
2021	Amnesia (アムネジア)	February 24	66	—	

=== Digital singles ===
Year	Title	Release date
As CrazyBoy
2019	PINK DIAMOND	August 23
2019	PINK DIAMOND Part2	September 21

=== Digital albums ===
Year	Title	Release date
As CRAZYBOY
2017	NEOTOKYO EP	February 24
2017	NEOTOKYO II EP	July 7
2018	NEOTOKYO III EP	January 19
2018	NEOTOKYO IV EP	April 27
2018	CRAZYBOY presents NEOTOKYO 〜THE PRIVATE PARTY 2018〜 SETLIST	November 16
2018	CRAZYBOY presents NEOTOKYO ~THE PRIVATE PARTY 2018~ LIVE	December 5
As CrazyBoy
2022	HIP LIFE:POP LIFE	January 21
2022	NEOTOKYO V EP	July 29

=== Best albums ===
Year	Release date	Title
	As CRAZYBOY	
2018	July 4	NEOTOKYO FOREVER

=== Music cards ===
Release date	Title
As CRAZYBOY
September 16, 2017	Double Play
As CrazyBoy
August 23, 2019	PINK DIAMOND

=== Video albums ===
Year	Release date	Title
	As CRAZYBOY	
2017	September 21	NEOTOKYO WORLD
2018	December 19	CRAZYBOY presents NEOTOKYO 〜THE PRIVATE PARTY 2018〜

=== Participating works ===
Year	Release date	Title	Artist	Album
As ELLY
2014	June 4	THE ANTHEM	Exile Shokichi	BACK TO THE FUTURE
2014	November 19	#HOTLINE	Doberman Infinity	#PRLG
2015	July 15	Heartbeat	Doberman Infinity	SAY YEAH!!
As CRAZYBOY
2015	July 22	Anytime	Exile Shokichi	Don't Stop the Music
2016	March 30	Feel So Alive	Sandaime J Soul Brothers from Exile Tribe	THE JSB LEGACY
2016	June 15	MIGHTY WARRIORS	Mighty Warriors	HiGH&LOW ORIGINAL BEST ALBUM
2016	June 15	FUNK JUNGLE	Mighty Warriors	HiGH&LOW ORIGINAL BEST ALBUM
2016	July 6,	HELLA RICH	Anarchy	BLKFLG
2016	July 20	Around The World	Mighty Crown	MIGHTY CROWN 25th Anniversary CHAMPION IN ACTON
2017	March 8	J.S.B. LOVE	Sandaime J Soul Brothers from Exile Tribe	HAPPY
2017	April 28	PLAY THAT	PKCZ	360° ChamberZ
2017	August 2	X-RAY	PKCZ	360° ChamberZ
2017	August 2	T-REX	PKCZ	360° ChamberZ
2017	August 2	CHAIN BREAKER (ALBUM Ver)	PKCZ	360° ChamberZ
2017	August 2	MIGHTY WARRIORS (ALBUM Ver)	PKCZ	360° ChamberZ
2017	October 25	DREAM BOYS	Mighty Warriors	HiGH&LOW THE MIGHTY WARRIORS
2017	October 25	GOOD LIFE	Mighty Warriors	HiGH&LOW THE MIGHTY WARRIORS
2018	January 26	LUXE	Hiroomi Tosaka	LUXE
2018	February 5	HeartBreakerZ	Honest Boyz	HeartBreakerZ
2018	February 23	BOW DOWN	PKCZ & Snoop Dogg & Yultron	BOW DOWN
2018	April 18	untitled	Doberman Infinity	OFF ROAD
2018	October 3	Y.L.S.S. Remix	Exile Shokichi	Futen Boyz
2019	March 13	RAISE THE FLAG	Sandaime J Soul Brothers from Exile Tribe	Yes we are
As CrazyBoy
2019	July 12	LION KING	Hiroomi Tosaka	SUPERMOON 〜閃〜
2019	October 19	Call Me Before You Sleep	Jessica Jung	
2021	June 16	TONIGHT	Sandaime J Soul Brothers from Exile Tribe	THIS IS JSB
2021	August 6	Warriors Anthem	Mighty Warriors	
2022	May 11	99’	Taichi Mukai	Antidote
2023	March 14	Bang! Bang!	W-inds	Beyond
2023	April 7	BREAK THE LAW	Takanori Iwata	

== Tie-ups ==
Title	Notes
CLAPTIME	

== Tour ==
=== Solo ===
- CRAZYBOY presents NEOTOKYO 〜THE PRIVATE PARTY 2018〜

=== As guest ===
- Crystal Kay 「10th Anniversary Tour CK10」(November- December, 2009)

== Filmography ==
=== TV dramas ===
Year	Title	Role	Network	Notes	Ref.
2011	Rokudenashi Blues		Nippon TV	Episode 7	
2016	High&Low Season 2	ICE	Nippon TV		
2016	Night Hero NAOTO	Himself	TV Tokyo	Episode 1,2, 4, 7;Ending dance	

=== Films ===
Year	Title	Role	Ref.	Notes
2014	Crows Explode	Yamashita Gohei		
2015	TRASH / トラッシュ (Trash)	Hondō Kento		
2016	Road to High&Low	ICE		
2016	High&Low The Movie	ICE		
2016	BLKFLG the Movie	Himself		Short
2017	High&Low The Movie 2 / End of Sky	ICE		
2017	High&Low The Movie 3 / Final Mission	ICE		
2025	Ya Boy Kongming! The Movie	Sekitoba Kung Fu		

=== Stage ===
Year	Title	Role	Notes
2010	Gekidan Exile Junction#1: Night Ballet		
2010	Gekidan Exile Daiyonkai Kōen: Dance Earth: Negai		
2010	Gekidan Exile Hana-gumi × Kaze Kumiai dō Kōen: Rokudenashi Blues		

=== Music videos ===
Year	Title	Artist
2008	キズあとを君に...	SLOW
2008	ooh wee Rida	Toshinobu Kubota
2009	Dreamlover	DJ MAKIDAI
2009	SHOCK-運命-	Meisa Kuroki
2016	YEAH!! YEAH!! YEAH!!	EXILE THE SECOND
2018	Underdog	EXILE SHOKICHI

=== Voice acting ===
Year	Title	Role
2017	HiGH&LOW g-sword Animation DVD Special Edition	ICE

=== Advertisements ===
Year	Title	Notes	Ref.
2018	Nissin (Cup Noodle)		

== Works ==
=== Choreography ===
Year	Title	Artist	Album	Ref.
2012	Hanabi	Sandaime J Soul Brothers from Exile Tribe	MIRACLE	
2013	SO RIGHT	Sandaime J Soul Brothers from Exile Tribe	BLUE IMPACT	
2013	Fuyu monogatari	Sandaime J Soul Brothers from Exile Tribe	BLUE IMPACT	
2014	R.Y.U.S.E.I.	Sandaime J Soul Brothers from Exile Tribe	PLANET SEVEN	
2014	C.O.S.M.O.S. 〜秋桜〜	Sandaime J Soul Brothers from Exile Tribe	PLANET SEVEN	
2014	O.R.I.O.N.	Sandaime J Soul Brothers from Exile Tribe	PLANET SEVEN	
2015	Eeny, meeny, miny, moe!	Sandaime J Soul Brothers from Exile Tribe	PLANET SEVEN	
2015	J.S.B. DREAM	Sandaime J Soul Brothers from Exile Tribe	THE JSB LEGACY	
2015	Summer Madness	Sandaime J Soul Brothers from Exile Tribe	THE JSB LEGACY	
2014	MAKE A MIRACLE	EXILE ATSUSHI	Music	
2015	Don't Stop the Music	EXILE SHOKICHI	THE FUTURE	
2016	GA GA SUMMER	DOBERMAN INFINITY	TERMINAL	

2015	Share the Love	The Sharehappi from Sandaime J Soul Brothers from Exile Tribe
2019	Rat-tat-tat	Sandaime J Soul Brothers

=== Artist production ===
- CRAZY SHIKAKKEI

== Other works ==
In April 2017, Elly was appointed as the tourism ambassador of his hometown Misawa, Aomori
