= Fighters (song) =

Single by Sandaime J Soul Brothers

from the album Tribal Soul
- B-side: "Tsugi no Jidai e -Orchestra Version-"
- Released: September 7, 2011 (Japan)
- Recorded: 2011
- Genre: J-Pop
- Length: 17:37
- Label: rhythm zone
- Songwriter(s): lil'showy・P-CHO・GS・ KUBO-C・Tomogen
- Producer(s): EXILE HIRO

Sandaime J Soul Brothers singles chronology
"Love Song" (2011)	"Fighters" (2011)	"Refrain 2" (2011)

"Fighters" (styled FIGHTERS) is a single by Japanese group Sandaime J Soul Brothers from Exile Tribe. It was released on September 7, 2011. It debuted in number one on the weekly Oricon Singles Chart, selling 83,048 copies.

== Track List ==
1. FIGHTERS [3:20]
2. Tsugi no Jidai e (次の時代へ) -Orchestra Version- [5:31]
3. FIGHTERS（Instrumental）
4. Tsugi no Jidai e (次の時代へ) -Orchestra Version-（Instrumental）
