= Akira (actor) =

Japanese actor and dancer (born 1981)

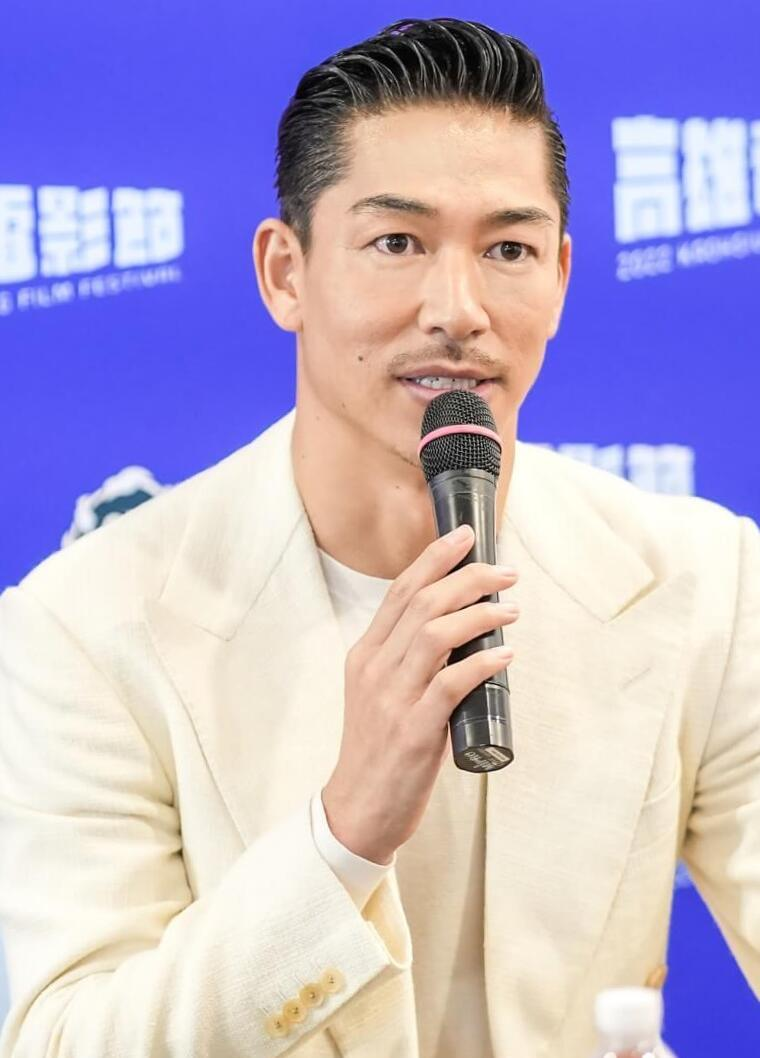
- Akira in 2022
- Born: Ryōhei Kurosawa; 23 August 1981 (age 44); Yamato, Kanagawa Prefecture, Japan
- Occupations: Actor; dancer
- Years active: 1997–present
- Agent: LDH
- Spouse: Lin Chi-ling (m. 2019)
- Children: 1

Ryōhei Kurosawa (黒澤 良平, Kurosawa Ryōhei; born 23 August 1981), known by the stage name Akira and Exile Akira (stylized in all caps), is a Japanese actor and dancer. He is also a member of the all-male J-Pop groups Exile and Exile The Second.

== Participating Groups ==
Name	Period of Time	Ref.
Exile	2006 -	
Exile The Second	2016 -	
Rag Pound	unknown	

== Life and career ==
Akira was born in Yokohama, Kanagawa Prefecture, Japan. He moved to Iwata, Shizuoka, at the age of three.

Akira started dancing at the age of 16, at dance club events around the Shizuoka area. He then moved to Tokyo and went on to find the talent agency Makidai & USA. In December 2004, he debuted as a performer in Rather Unique. In June 2006, he joined the group Exile as a performer.

He began working as an actor in March 2006, appearing in the "No.1 Attack" stage troupe Gumi Honan. Since then, he has acted in a number of TV dramas in Japan, including the 2012 remake of the Great Teacher Onizuka series, which has been broadcast on Fuji TV since July 2012.

In 2015, Akira provided the voice of Mad Max in the Japanese dub of the film Mad Max: Fury Road.

In September 2016, was announced that he was joining the group Exile The Second as a performer.

In June 2019, he announced that he will marry Lin Chi-ling, a Taiwanese supermodel and actress. Lin gave birth to a son on 31 January 2022.

== Works ==
=== TV Drama ===
- Around 40 - Chuumon no Ooi Onnatachi (TBS, April 2008-), role of Tatsuya Ogata
- Toomawari no Ame (NTV, 2010-Mar-27 start), role of Yasushi Kikuchi
- Tumbling (TBS, 2010-Apr-17 start), role of Yutaka Kashiwagi
- Gou - Himetachi no sengoku (NHK, 2011-Jan-09 to 2011-Nov-27), role of Hidekatsu Toyotomi
- GTO (Fuji TV, July 2012 - September 2012), role of Eikichi Onizuka
- The Case Files of Biblia Bookstore (Fuji TV, January 2013 - March 2013), role of Daisuke Goura
- Honey Trap (Fuji TV, October 2013 - December 2013), role of Yuuichi Miyama
- GTO (2nd season) (Fuji TV, July 2014 - September 2014), role of Eikichi Onizuka
- HEAT (Fuji TV, July 2015 - September 2015), role of Tatsuya Ikegami
- High & Low - The Story of S.W.O.R.D. (NTV, October 2015 - December 2015), role of Kohaku
- High & Low - The Story of S.W.O.R.D. (2nd season) (NTV, April 2016 - June 2016), role of Kohaku

=== Film ===
- Hana Yori Dango Final (2008), Sunny
- Yamagata Scream (2009), Santaro
- Properly convey (2009), North Shiro
- Legend of the Fist: The Return of Chen Zhen (2010), Chikaraishi Sasaki
- Hanjiro (2010), Yaichiro Nagayama
- Working Holiday (2012), Yamato Okita
- Kusahara no Isu (2013), Kagiyama
- Unfair: the end (2015),
- High & Low: The Movie (2016), Kohaku
- High&Low The Red Rain (2016), Kohaku
- High&Low The Movie 2 / End of Sky (2017), Kohaku
- High&Low The Movie 3 / Final Mission (2017), Kohaku
- Tatara Samurai (2017)
- This Old Road: Konomichi (2019), Kosaku Yamada
- The Pass: Last Days of the Samurai (2022), Yamamoto Tatewaki
- High&Low: The New World (2027)

=== Short film ===
- Cinema Fighters "Kimochirabo no Kaihō"(2018)
- Cinema Fighters Project "Beautiful" (2019)

=== TV Show ===
- Exile Generation (NTV, January 2009 - March 2010)
- EXH: Exile House (TBS, April 2009 - March 2010)
- Hiruxile (NTV, April 2010 - March 2011)
- EXE (TBS, April 2010 - September)
- Exile Tamashii (MBS TV MBS, TBS, October 2010)

== Radio ==
- Sessions Four (FM North Wave)
- Radio Mashup MASHUP (Yokohama FM radio, October 2010 -)
