= Kick & Slide =

Japanese anime television series

- Genre: Music
- Anime television series
- Directed by: Takafumi Otsuka
- Music by: PKCZ, Chaki Zulu
- Studio: CRAFTER
- Original network: TV Tokyo
- Original run: July 7, 2021 – September 22, 2021
- Episodes: 12

Kick & Slide is an original Japanese anime television series produced by animation studio CRAFTER. It aired in Japan on TV Tokyo through its Oha Suta children's variety program on July 7, 2021.

This is the LDH's first kids entertainment project "KIDS B HAPPY" which is a deformed character of the third generation J Soul Brothers.

The series was not yet dubbed in English.

== Plot ==
Kick & Slide is a slapstick story where the characters solve the difficult and rare cases in the pop vibrant city calls "Nakame Town" with their own dance and music technics.

== Characters ==
Kick (キック)
Voiced by: Natsuki Hanae
Beabea (ベアベア)
Voiced by: Misato Fukuen
Fenitan (フェニタン)
Voiced by: Nobuhiko Okamoto
Firere (フィレレ)
Voiced by: Hiroki Yasumoto
Pipipo (ピピポ)
Voiced by: Tomoko Kaneda
Robobo (ロボボ)
Voiced by: Miyuki Sawashiro
Vampa (バンパ)
Voiced by: Hiroshi Kamiya

== Media ==
=== Anime ===
This series is being produced by CRAFTER. Planning by LDH Japan and KIDS B HAPPY Project. Directing, series composition and screenplay by Takafumi Otsuka, character design by Naomi Iwata, music composed by PKCZ and Chaki Zulu, sound directed by Kiyoshi Arakawa and executive producer is EXILE TRIBE. This anime's image song is "KICK&SLIDE” by the third generation J SOUL BROTHERS.
