= GaruGaku =

Japanese anime television series

- GaruGaku: Saint Girls Square Academy
- Promotional visual for GaruGaku.

ガル学。〜聖ガールズスクエア学院〜 (GaruGaku: Sei Gāruzu Sukueia Gakuin)
- Manga
- Written by: Kahori Orito
- Published by: Shogakukan
- Magazine: Ciao
- Original run: April 3, 2020 – March 3, 2021
- Volumes: 1
- Anime television series

GaruGaku: Saint Girls Square Academy
- Directed by: Hiroaki Akagi (Note: Credited as Chief Director (総監督, Sō Kantoku).); Norihito Takahashi; Makoto Nakata
- Written by: Junichi Fujisaku
- Music by: Shigeru Yamamoto
- Studio: OLM Team Kato; Wit Studio
- Original network: TV Tokyo (via Oha Suta)
- Original run: April 6, 2020 – March 29, 2021
- Episodes: 50
- Television drama

GaruGaku: Girls Garden
- Original network: TX Network (TV Tokyo, TV Osaka, TV Aichi)
- Original run: July 7, 2021 – September 29, 2021
- Episodes: 12
- Anime television series

GaruGaku II: Lucky Stars
- Directed by: Makoto Nakata
- Written by: Junichi Fujisaku
- Music by: Shigeru Yamamoto
- Studio: OLM Team Kato
- Original network: TV Tokyo (via Oha Suta)
- Original run: January 10, 2022 – March 18, 2022
- Episodes: 10 (50 parts)
- Manga

GaruGaku II: Lucky Stars
- Written by: Kahori Orito
- Published by: Shogakukan
- Magazine: Ciao
- Original run: February 3, 2022 – April 1, 2022

GaruGaku: Saint Girls Square Academy (Japanese: ガル学。〜聖ガールズスクエア学院〜, Hepburn: GaruGaku: Sei Gāruzu Sukueia Gakuin) is an anime series produced by OLM and Wit Studio and directed by Norihito Takahashi. The series follows a group of girls based on and voiced by members of the idol group Girls², who aim to perform on the Girls Arena stage. The show aired from April 2020 to March 2021 on the CharaSta segments of the children's morning show Oha Suta where the girls were Oha Girls. A second season aired from January to March 2022.

A manga adaptation was serialized in Shogakukan's Ciao magazine from April 2020 to March 2021. In March 2021, it was revealed that the anime would be adapted as a live-action drama with the Girls2 members playing their respective characters.

== Plot ==
Toa is a new transfer student at St. Girls Square Academy, with the goal to stand on the Girls Arena stage. She encounters three teams of girls who all share the same dream and influences them with her happy, positive nature. The three teams work hard at their Girls Activities so they can be the team to stand on that stage.

St. Girls Square Academy is a pro-star performer school, and it is only open to those who have passed the auditions that have been held around the country. The students form a team where they dream of performing on the stage of the biggest event that is held once a year. However, only one team can stand on the stage.

== Characters ==
=== Main characters ===
- Yuzuha Oda as Yuzuha, the shy member of east2.
- Momoka Sumitani as Momoka, the boke of west2.
- Misaki Tsuruya as Misaki, the student council president and leader of south2.
- Yōka Ogawa as Yōka, member of the student council and member of south2.
- Kurea Masuda as Kurea, the vice student council president and member of south2.
- Minami Hishida as Minami, the tsukkomi of west2.
- Kira Yamaguchi as Kira, member of the student council and member of south2.
- Toa Harada as Toa, the happy-go-lucky newest member of east2.
- Ran Ishii as Ran, skilled dancer and singer of east2.

=== Supporting ===
==== Anime-only Characters ====
- Live Mukai as A.I Toa
- Yoshino Aoyama as A.I Yuzuha
- Mikoto Nakai as A.I Ran
- Ayase Goto as A.I Misaki
- Nanami Yamashita as A.I Youka
- Rina Honnizumi as A.I Kurea
- Madoka Asahina as A.I Kira
- Minami Iba as A.I Momoka
- Songhwa as A.I Minami
- Teppei Uenishi as Mr. Takuro

==== Drama-only Characters ====
- Exile Tetsuya as Manabu Eguchi, the Principal of St. Girls Square Academy.
- Miwako Kakei as Natsu Ota, an editor for free magazine "Harajuku Ai".
- Yoshihiko Hakamada as Eito Hanabuki, a man who knows a lot about Harajuku.
- Yūtarō as Takumi, works in the editorial department of "Harajuku Ai".
- Subaru Kimura as Subanii
- Rina Yamaguchi as Rina, a student at St. Girls Square Academy who is recruited by Toa to be a make-up model.

== Media ==
=== Anime ===
The series was first announced on March 3, 2020, on the Japanese children's morning show Oha Suta. It premiered on the show's "CharaSta" segment on April 6, 2020. Due to COVID-19, a temporary suspension of the anime was announced, and from May 4 onwards, a rebroadcast of previous episodes aired. The anime began broadcasting again from July 6 with episode 5. On August 24, it was revealed that the anime would air new episodes on Tuesday as well starting from August 31. The final Tuesday episode was released on October 27, continuing in November with episodes airing only on Mondays. The final episode aired on March 29, 2021. The opening theme "Centimeter" (センチメートル) was provided by Girls² and used as the Oha Suta theme song. The anime had 16 endings, all provided by the sub-units East², South², West² and finally Girls².

A second season titled GaruGaku II: Lucky Stars was announced on December 1, 2021. OLM returned to produce the season, with Makoto Nakata serving as the director, and Junichi Fujisaku writing the scripts. It aired from January 10 to March 18, 2022, on Oha Suta.

=== Manga ===
A manga adaptation was serialized in Shogakukan's Ciao magazine from April 3, 2020, to March 3, 2021. A second manga adaptation was serialized in the same magazine from February 3 to April 1, 2022.

=== Live-action drama ===
The drama was first announced on March 28, 2021, further revealing that Girls2 will reprise their roles, as well as providing the opening theme to which Subaru Kimura revealed his participation. On June 8, GaruGaku: Girls Garden was revealed to be the title of the drama series, set to air from July 7 on TV Tokyo. Girls^{2} performed the opening theme "Enjoy" (featuring Subaru Kimura) and the ending theme "Good Days". The full cast was announced on June 22, with Exile Tetsuya, Miwako Kakei, Yoshihiko Hakamada and Yūtarō being announced. Subaru Kimura was also announced to make a guest appearance, and Lucky2's Rina Yamaguchi to make a minor appearance as a student.
