= Sandaime =

Sandaime (Japanese: 三代目, "The Third") is a Japanese language word. It may refer to:

- Hiruzen Sarutobi (猿飛 ヒルゼン, Sarutobi Hiruzen), the Third Hokage (三代目火影, Sandaime Hokage), a character from the manga series Naruto
- Sandaime J Soul Brothers from Exile Tribe, a Japanese musical group known colloquially as Sandaime
