= Kenchi Tachibana =

Japanese dancer and actor

- 橘 ケンチ
- Born: Kenichiro Teratsuji (寺辻 健一郎, Teratsuji Ken'ichirō); 28 September 1979 (age 47); Kanagawa Prefecture, Japan
- Other name: KENCHI
- Occupations: Dancer; actor
- Years active: 2002–present
- Notable work: Attaku No. 1
- Television: Rokudenashi Blues
- Website: Official website

Kenichiro Teratsuji (寺辻健一郎; Teratsuji Kenichiro, born September 28, 1979, in Yokohama, Japan), better known by his stage names Kenchi Tachibana (橘ケンチ) or simply KENCHI, is a Japanese dancer and actor. He is a member of J-Pop groups Exile and Exile The Second. He was also member of J Soul Brothers' second generation Nidaime J Soul Brothers until their migration to Exile in 2009.

He is represented with LDH and also acts as a representative of LDH Asia.

== Biography ==
Kenchi was born on September 28, 1979, in Yokohama, Japan and grew up in Yokosuka, Kanagawa Prefecture.

He became an active dancer in his youth and joined dance teams such as Poly-3, Fulcrum and Red Blockerz in his early 20s. At the same time, he also started working as an LDH apparel staff.

In 2007, he was selected as a member of the group Nidaime J Soul Brothers. They announced their indefinite hiatus after releasing one album in 2009 and all members joined the line-up of Exile shortly after.

In July 2012, Kenchi joined the Exile sub-unit Exile The Second alongside his fellow former Nidaime J Soul Brothers members Nesmith, Shokichi, Keiji and Tetsuya.

On December 4, 2015, he was announced as leader of Exile The Second.

In 2017, Kenchi entered the literature business by becoming an ambassador for the 2nd Short Shorts Award. He also opened his blog Tachibana Bookstore, in which he regularly introduces the books he has read.

While attending a business presentation for the Future Sake Project (未来の日本酒プロジェクト) held in Tokyo on February 21, 2019, he expressed his desire to enter the Sake business with a long-term perspective. On September 8 in the same year, Kenchi opened his first Izakaya with the name LDH Kitchen IZAKAYA AOBADAI in Tokyo. The Izakaya is intended to collaborate with local Sake breweries and to hold events related to Sake and Japanese culture every day.

In 2023, he made his stage musical debut, in the role of Miguel da Corella in CESARE ~ Creator of Destruction ~.

== Personal life ==
Kenchi and Exile members Akira, Tetsuya and Keiji met each other and became friends in the early 2000s, long before entering LDH as artists.

On October 1, 2019, Kenchi announced his marriage to a non-celebrity woman in her 30s. They were introduced to each other by mutual friends and had been dating for 3 years. This made him the 8th married member of Exile.

== Participating groups ==
Name	Period of time	Ref.
Poly-3	2002 – unknown	
Fulcrum	2005 – 2006	
Red Blockerz	2006 – unknown	
Nidaime J Soul Brothers	25 January 2007 – 1 March 2009	
Exile	1 March 2009 –	
Exile The Second	2012 –	

== Filmography ==
=== Stage ===
Year	Title	Role	Ref.
2004	Heart of Gold: Street Future Opera Beat Pops		
2008	Crown Nemuranai Yoru no Hate ni...		
2009	Attaku No. 1	Military Medicine Captain Hideaki Muramatsu, Lt. Ichiro Terauchi	
2010	Night Ballet	Oga / Miyake	
2011	Moshimo Kimi ga.	Yumoto	
2011	Red Cliff: Sen	Sun Quan	
2012	Guitar o Machinagara	Makoto Kurosawa	
2012	Love Letters 2012 22nd Anniversary	Andy	
2014	Atami Satsujin Jiken Battle Royal	Seigei Kimura	
2014	Utahime	Matsu's Croissant	
2015	Don Dracula	Count Don Dracula	
2016	Aitakute...		
2019	Mōryōnohako (魍魎の匣)		
2023	CESARE ~ Creator of Destruction ~	Miguel da Corella	

=== Films ===
Year	Title	Role	Notes	Ref.
2006	Backdancers!			
2013	SPEC: Close	Kentaro Fukuda		
2016	Road To High & Low	Nikaido		
2016	High & Low: The Movie	Nikaido		
2016	Ninkyō Yarō	Muto		
2024	The Hotel of My Dream			
2025	Step Out			

=== TV dramas ===
Year	Title	Role	Notes	Ref.
2009	Genryō Boxer	Pancho Tamura	Co-starring with Naoto	
2011	Rokudenashi Blues	Fuji Maeda		
2011	QP	Mario		
2013	Star Man Kono Hoshi no Koi	Kohei Satake		
2015	Oretachi ga Propose Dekinai no ni wa, 3ttsu no Riyū shika nakuteda na	Shunsuke Hoshino		
2015	High & Low –The Story Of S.W.O.R.D.–	Nikaido		
2016	Night Hero Naoto		Episode 9; ending dance	

=== TV programmes ===
Year	Title	Notes	Ref.
2011	Shūkan Exile	MC	
2012	Ex-Lounge	MC	
2013	Little Charo 4 Eigo de Aruku New York		
2014	Exile Casino		

=== Radio ===
Year	Title	Network	Notes	Ref.
2009	Oh! My Radio	J-Wave		
2011	Radio Mashup	FM Yokohama		

=== Advertisements ===
Year	Title	Ref.
2011	Recruit Hot Pepper Gourmet	
2012	Fujitsu Arrows	
2012	Angfa "Scalp D"	
2013	Hisamitsu Pharmaceutical "Air Salon Path"	
2013	The Coca-Cola Company Coca-Cola Zero	
2013	Daiichi Kosho Company "SmartDam"	
2015	Yōfuku no Aoyama	

=== Magazine serials ===
Year	Title	Ref.
2014	Gekkan The Television	

=== Others ===
Year	Title	Notes	Ref.
2016	Yokosuka Excitement Ambassador		
2017	2nd Short Shorts Award	Ambassador	
