= Keiji Kuroki =

Former Japanese dancer and actor (born 1980)

- 黒木 啓司
- Born: 21 January 1980 (age 46); Kiyotake (now Miyazaki) Miyazaki District, Miyazaki, Japan
- Other names: KJ; Keiji (stylized as KEIJI)
- Occupations: Dancer; actor
- Years active: 2003–2022
- Notable work: Attaku No. 1
- Television: Monsieur!; Namae o nakushita Megami; The Reason I Can't Find My Love
- Height: 180 cm (5 ft 11 in)
- Spouse: Reika Miyazaki (m. 2021)
- Website: Official website

Keiji Kuroki (黒木 啓司, Kuroki Keiji; born 21 January 1980, in Miyazaki Prefecture) is a former Japanese dancer and actor. He was a member of Exile, Exile The Second and Nidaime J Soul Brothers. Kuroki was represented by LDH.

== Personal life ==
In December 2021, Kuroki revealed that he had married businesswoman Reika Miyazaki. Reika is a single-mother of three children from a previous relationship.

At the end of October 2022, he announced through his agency that he will be retiring from the entertainment industry.

== Participating groups ==
Name	Period of time
Soul Demention	2003 – unknown
Fulcrum	2005 – 2006
Big Doggs	2006 – unknown
Nidaime J Soul Brothers	January 2007 – 1 March 2009
Exile	1 March 2009 – 2022
Exile The Second	1 July 2012 – 2022

== Filmography ==
※His roles in bold are his starring works

=== Stage ===
Year	Title	Role
2004	Heart of Gold –Street Future Opera Beat Pops–	
2008	Crown Nemuranai Yoru no Hate ni...	
2009	Attaku No. 1	Lieutenant Tetsuo Otaki
2009	Words –Yakusoku / Uragiri– subete, Ushinawa reshi mono no tame...	Kento
2010	Moshimo Kimi ga.	**Yumoto**
2010	Night Ballet	**Azuma**
2010	Kirawa re Matsuko no Isshō	Tetsuya Yamegawa
2010	The Mensetsu	**Taro Shibuya**
2012	Kagemusha Dokuganryū	Tokichiro, Toyotomi Hideyoshi
2013	Monsieur!	**Hideo Date**

=== Films ===
Year	Title	Role	Ref.
2006	Backdancers!		
2015	Crossroad	**Itsuki Sawada**	
2016	Road to High & Low	Rocky	
2016	High & Low: The Movie	Rocky	

=== TV dramas ===
Year	Title	Role	Network	Notes	Ref.
2011	Namae o nakushita Megami	Kei Sawada	Fuji TV		
2011	The Reason I Can't Find My Love	Ryoichi Kawabata	Fuji TV		
2011	Akujo-tachi no Mesu	Masahiko Nakamura	Fuji TV		
2013	Saikō no Rikon	Keisuke Omura	Fuji TV	Episode 3	
2013	Monsieur!	**Hideo Date**	CBC		
2013	Last Cinderella	Taku Kondo	Fuji TV	Episodes 10 and 11	
2013	Kyōkō-han-gakari Hisae Uozumi: Dolce 2	Takashi Inoue	Fuji TV		
2014	Bitter Blood	Koji Takano	Fuji TV		
2015	Zannen na Otto.	Shun Sato	Fuji TV		
2015	Senryoku-gai Sōsa-kan		NTV		
2015	Wild Heroes	Noriaki "Tenten" Hayashida	NTV		
2015	High & Low: The Story Of S.W.O.R.D.	Rocky	NTV		
2016	Night Hero Naoto		TV Tokyo	Episode 1; ending dance	

=== Internet dramas ===
Year	Title	Role	Website
2012	Kimi to Boku to no Yakusoku	**Shuji Shibui**	Bee TV

=== TV programmes ===
Year	Title	Network	Notes
2011	Shūkan Exile	TBS	Reporter

=== Internet programmes ===
Year	Title	Website	Notes
2016	BPM –Best People's Music–	AbemaTV	MC

=== Advertisements ===
Year	Title	Ref.
2011	Recruit Hot Pepper	
2012	Fujitsu Arrows	
2012	Angfa "Scalp D"	
2013	Hisamitsu Pharmaceutical "Air Salon Path"	
2013	The Coca-Cola Company Coca-Cola Zero	
2013	Daiichi Kosho Company "Smart Dam"	
2015	Yōfuku no Aoyama	

=== Magazine serializations ===
Year	Title
2014	Fukuoka Walker
2014	Sense "Exile Keiji no My Love"

=== Others ===
Year	Title	Ref.
2012	Miyazaki Ambassador	

== Productions ==
Year	Title	Notes	Ref.
2012	Retort food "Otoko ga Zettai yorokobu Dan Stew", "Kimi to Tabetai Jo Stew"	Co-developed with Tatsuya Kawagoe	
