= Exile the Second =

Japanese music group

EXILE THE SECOND
- Also known as: Nidaime J Soul Brothers (2007–2009); The Second from Exile (2012–2016); The Second
- Origin: Tokyo, Japan
- Genres: Pop; dance; electronic; rock
- Years active: 2012–present
- Label: Rhythm Zone
- Members: Kenchi Tachibana; Tetsuya; Nesmith; Shokichi; Akira
- Past members: Keiji Kuroki
- Website: t-second.jp

Exile the Second (stylized as EXILE THE SECOND, formerly known as The Second from Exile), or simply The Second, is a Japanese music group comprising Exile members Kenchi, Keiji, Tetsuya, Nesmith, Shokichi and Akira. Formed in 2012, the group is managed by LDH and is signed to the Avex Group record label Rhythm Zone.

The members of The Second debuted in 2007 as members of Nidaime J Soul Brothers (二代目J Soul Brothers), the second generation of the music group J Soul Brothers. The group retired after releasing one album, and the members officially joined their main group Exile in 2009.

The date of February 22 means the "Exile the Second Day".

== History ==
=== 2007–2012: Formation and debut ===
In January 2007, Exile announced that they would hold an audition to recruit new members for the second generation of J Soul Brothers. Nesmith and Shokichi, finalists of the Exile Vocal Battle Audition, were the first members to join the new generation in August 2007. Performers Kenchi, Keiji, and Tetsuya were soon added. Three months later, performers Naoto and Naoki were added, and they gave their debut performances at Color's 2007 nationwide tour, Color Live Tour 2007: Blue. The second generation, called Nidaime J Soul Brothers, released their debut single "WE!" in May 2008 under the indie label Rhythm Republic. Nidaime J Soul Brothers announced their hiatus after the release of their first self-titled album J Soul Brothers in February 2009. A month later, all Nidaime members joined the line-up of Exile. Members Naoto and Naoki stayed behind to re-join J Soul Brothers' third generation, the Sandaime J Soul Brothers.

On July 1, 2012, during Exile Tribe's tour Exile Tribe Live Tour 2012 ~Tower of Wish~, the formation of The Second from Exile as a unit from Exile was officially announced. The group activities started on November 7 of the same year with their debut single "Think 'Bout It!". A day after, the group held their first live performance at GirlsAward by 2012 Autumn / Winter.

=== 2013–2015: First album The II Age and Exile Tribe Perfect Year 2014 ===
On August 14, 2013, the group their 2nd single "Survivors" feat. DJ Makidai from Exile / Pride.

On February 5, 2014, they released their first album, The II Age. It sold over 51.000 copies in the first week of its release and thus became their first album to top Oricon's weekly albums chart. The group also participated in Exile Tribe's Exile Tribe Perfect Year Live Tour Tower of Wish 2014 ~The Revolution~ tour in 2014.

After the release of their first album in 2014, the group went on an indefinite hiatus, only doing activities as members of Exile.

On December 4, 2015, Kenchi Tachibana was announced as leader of Exile The Second.

=== 2016: Name change, addition of Akira and first tour ===
On May 20, the group changed its name from The Second from Exile to Exile the Second.

On June 6, they announced their 3rd single "Yeah!! Yeah!! Yeah!!", to be released on July 13.

On September 5, LDH announced that Exile's member Akira would join the group, making Exile The Second a 6-member group. Prior to joining the group, he appeared in the music videos of their last two singles "Yeah!! Yeah!! Yeah!!" and "Shut Up!! Shut Up!! Shut Up!!".

On September 21, the group released their 5th single "Wild Wild Wild". The title track was used as the official theme song for the Japanese release of the movie Suicide Squad. The single ranked #1 on Oricon's weekly single chart.

The group held their first nationwide tour Exile the Second Live Tour 2016–2017 "Wild Wild Warriors" from October 29, 2016, until May 14, 2017.

=== 2017: Second album Born to Be Wild and second tour ===
On March 1, the group released their second album Born to Be Wild. It sold over 62.000 copies in the first week of its release and topped Oricon's weekly album chart.

On April 16, Exile The Second were invited as the final performers of AbemaTV 1st Anniversary Live at Ex Theater Roppongi in Tokyo.

On June 28, the group released their 7th single "Summer Lover".

On September 27, the group released their 8th single "Route 66". The music video for the title track was directed by Dave Meyers, this being his first work for a J-pop artist. The single also included live footage from the final performance of the group's first arena tour Exile the Second Live Tour 2016–2017 "Wild Wild Warriors".

On October 28, the group started their second tour Exile the Second Live Tour 2017–2018 "Route 6・6", that went until May 24, 2018.

=== 2018: Third album Highway Star ===
On February 20, 2018, the group released their 9th single "Acacia".

On March 28, one year after the release of their album Born to Be Wild, they released their third album titled Highway Star.

On May 14, it was announced that Exile the Second's song "Hi Noboru Hikari ni ~ Pray for Now ~ " (日昇る光に ～Pray for Now～; Sunlight rising to Pray for Now) was chosen as the official support song for the Japanese Judo Federation during the 2020 Tokyo Olympics.

On May 23, the group released their first live DVD titled Exile the Second Live Tour 2017–2018 "Route 6・6". It sold over 18.000 copies in the first week of its release and topped Oricon's weekly DVD ranking. Combined with the sales of the Blu-ray Disc version, Exile The Second's first video work sold over 27.000 units in the first week.

During the last concert of their Exile the Second Live Tour 2017–2018 "Rpute 6・6" The Final at Makuhari Messe on May 24, Exile appeared as a surprise guest for the first time together after two and a half years of hiatus. Additionally, they announced the release date of their new album and the details of their first nationwide dome tour in 3 years.

The group also participated in Exile's Exile Live Tour 2018 "Star of Wish" that went from September 15, 2018, until February 11, 2019.

=== 2019–present: Singles ===
On September 17, 2019, it was announced they would digitally release two songs, "Top Down" and "Ain't Afraid to Die" on October 4. Both songs were used in the TV drama HiGH&LOW The Worst Episode.O. and the movie HiGH&LOW: The Worst.

On October 1, 2019, it was announced that the group would collaborate with Italian racing car brand Abarth for their "Scorpion Spirit Campaign". It would be the third project in a new series that reflects the world of Abarth, which features Japanese photographer Kei Ogata. The collaboration with Exile The Second would revolve around "Sound", after the first project was themed "Style" and the second one "Performance". For this occasion, the group would release a new music video and will also be featured in the ABARTH Brand Movie that is going to be released on November 9.

Furthermore, it was announced that Exile the Second and Exile would release a split single on January 1, 2020, as the first release of LDH Perfect Year 2020. The song by Exile the Second is titled "Shunkan Eternal" (瞬間エターナル; Moment Eternal) while Exile's song is titled "Ai no Tame ni (For Love, for a Child)" (愛のために ～ for love, for a child ～; For Love ～ for love, for a child ～). "Shunkan Eternal" was also appointed as the title song for the new "Suit & Coat Basketball" TV commercial from Aoyama Prestige Technology starring group members Nesmith and Shokichi.

== Members ==
=== Current ===
- Kenchi Tachibana (寺辻健一郎)
- Nesmith (ネスミス)
- Shokichi (八木 将吉)
- Tetsuya (土田哲也)
- Akira (黒沢良平)

=== Former ===
- Keiji Kuroki (黒木 啓司)

== Discography ==
=== Studio albums ===
List of albums, with selected chart positions
Title	Album details	Peak positions	Sales
Title	Album details	JPN	Sales
The II Age	Released: February 5, 2014 (JPN); Label: Rhythm Zone; Formats: CD, CD/DVD, CD/Blu-ray, digital download	1	JPN: 63,236
Born to Be Wild	Released: March 11, 2017 (JPN); Label: Rhythm Zone	1	
Highway Star	Released: March 28, 2018 (JPN); Label: Rhythm Zone	3	

=== Compilation albums ===
Title	Album details	Peak positions
Title	Album details	JPN
Exile the Second the Best	Released: February 22, 2020; Label: Rhythm Zone; Formats: 2CD, 2CD/DVD, 2CD/Blu-ray	2

=== Extended plays ===
List of EPs, with selected chart positions
Title	EP details	Peak positions	Sales
Title	EP details	JPN	Sales
The Far East Cowboyz	Released: June 5, 2024 (JPN); Label: Rhythm Zone	8	JPN: 8,485

=== Singles ===
List of singles, with selected chart positions
Title	Release date	Peak chart positions		Certifications	Album
Title	Release date	JPN	JPN Hot100 (Note: Sources for chart positions are as follows: "Think 'bout It", "Survivors",)	Certifications	Album
"Think 'Bout It!"	2012/11/07	1	3	RIAJ: Gold	The II Age
"Survivors" feat. DJ Makidai from Exile / Pride (プライド)"	2013/08/14	2	8	RIAJ: Gold	The II Age
"Yeah!! Yeah!! Yeah!!"	2016/07/13	2	2	RIAJ: Gold	Born to Be Wild
"Shut Up!! Shut Up!! Shut Up!!"	2016/08/24	4	9	—	Born to Be Wild
"Wild Wild Wild"	2016/09/21	1	2	—	Born to Be Wild
"Super Fly"	2017/02/22	4	7	—	Born to Be Wild
"Summer Lover"	2017/06/28	2	2	—	Highway Star
"Route 66"	2017/09/27	2	3	—	Highway Star
"Acacia (アカシア)"	2018/02/22	3	5	—	Highway Star
"—" denotes items that did not chart.

=== Digital singles ===
Title	Release date	Album
"Top Down"	2019/10/04	Exile the Second the Best
"Ain't Afraid to Die"	2019/10/04	Exile the Second the Best

== Live ==
=== As a lead artist ===
Year	Period	Title
2016-2017	From October 29 to May 14	EXILE THE SECOND LIVE TOUR 2016-2017 "WILD WILD WARRIORS"
2017-2018	From October 28 to May 24	EXILE THE SECOND LIVE TOUR 2017-2018 "ROUTE 6・6"
2020	From April 4 to July 18	EXILE THE SECOND PERFECT LIVE 2012▶2020

=== As a participating group ===
Year	Title	Artist
2014	EXILE TRIBE PERFECT YEAR 2014 SPECIAL STAGE "THE SURVIVAL" IN SAITAMA SUPER ARENA 10DAYS	Exile Tribe
2014	EXILE TRIBE PERFECT YEAR LIVE TOUR TOWER OF WISH 2014 ~THE REVOLUTION~	Exile Tribe
2016	HiGH&LOW THE LIVE	Exile Tribe
2018-2019	EXILE LIVE TOUR 2018-2019 "STAR OF WISH"	Exile
2019	LDH PERFECT YEAR 2020 COUNTDOWN LIVE 2019▶︎2020 "RISING"	

== Awards and nominations ==
=== MTV Video Music Awards Japan ===
The MTV Video Music Awards Japan is a music awards show hosted annually by MTV Japan.

Year	Nominee / work	Award	Result
2016	"Shut up!! Shut up!! Shut up!!!"	Best Group Video	Won
