= Nesmith (singer) =

Nesmith ネスミス・竜太・カリム
- Also known as: EXILE NESMITH; Nes
- Born: Karim Ryuta Nesmith; August 1, 1983 (age 43); Kumamoto Prefecture, Japan
- Occupations: Singer; Dancer
- Years active: 2001-present
- Label: Rhythm Zone
- Website: Official profile

Karim Ryuta Nesmith (ネスミス・竜太・カリム, Nesumisu Ryūta Karimu) or simply Nesmith (stylized as NESMITH) or Exile Nesmith, is a Japanese singer, dancer and actor who is the vocalist and performer of Exile and Exile The Second. He was also member of J Soul Brothers' second generation Nidaime J Soul Brothers until their migration to Exile in 2009.

== Biography ==
Nesmith Ryuta Karim was born on August 1, 1983, in Kumamoto, Japan. His mother is Japanese and his father Afro-American. Nesmith had always wanted to stand out since he was a child, so he started dreaming about becoming a singer. He was greatly influenced by Western music and artists such as Michael Jackson, Earth Wind and Fire, ZARD and many more. Nesmith's mother supported his dream of becoming a singer strongly and after he received an award in a local karaoke competition and was praised by his friends for his singing skills during junior high school days, he decided to go busking on the streets of his hometown.

Nesmith originally debuted as a member of the duo STEEL in 2001, however they disbanded in the following year. After that, he decided to study abroad in the United States and get in touch with his roots and the music that inspired him. While living 3 months each in Los Angeles and New York, he faced many difficulties since he couldn't speak English at all. However, his vocabulary and English skills improved significantly during his visit. While studying in New York, he stayed at his father's home who lived in New Jersey. The main focus of his studies was on music, especially R&B because he couldn't categorize this music genre properly. During that time, Nesmith was also able to meet Takeda Mayumi whose autobiographical book Fight! (ファイト!) greatly influenced and inspired him when he was bullied in junior high school. They stayed in contact afterwards and are still communicating with each other to this day.

Four years after the disbandment of STEEL, in July 2006, he participated in the EXILE VOCAL BATTLE AUDITION 2006 ~ASIAN DREAM~ and became one of the finalists, which allowed him to join the group Nidaime J Soul Brothers. The five finalists of the audition also formed the unit Dreamers ~EXILE VOCAL BATTLE AUDITION FINALIST~ in 2007. Prior to that, he debuted as a soloist in April 2006. Nidaime J Soul Brothers announced their indefinite hiatus after releasing one album in 2009 and all members joined the line-up of Exile shortly after.

In 2012, Nesmith joined the Exile sub-unit Exile The Second alongside his fellow former Nidaime J Soul Brothers members Shokichi, Kenchi, Keiji and Tetsuya.

In 2013, he also joined the coed-group Dance Earth Party for one year to participate in the Dance Earth project of his fellow Exile member Üsa. Prior to him joining the coed-group, he already participated in the Dance Earth project in 2010 by making his stage debut in its play Dance Earth: Negai.

On March 18, 2019, it was announced that Nesmith would make his musical debut in the Japanese version of the Broadway musical Peter Pan. He would act as the 22nd incarnation of Captain Hook/Darling. Other actors who had played this role before are Shinji Takeda, Rolly and Shinta Furuta for instance. On April 16 in the same year, it was announced that he would also launch a new music program titled NES-FES.(ネスフェス) in his hometown Kumamoto on the 26th of that month. Nesmith would take on the role of the MC and the monthly broadcasting would start on the 50th anniversary of TV Kumamoto. The content of the music program would include inviting various artists and special guests, delivering music information, music discussions, occasional collaborations and the introduction to local artists. On April 27, Nesmith, Leola and Spyair drummer Kenta held the acoustic live event THE PUMP UP ON at LDH Kitchen THE TOKYO HANEDA. It was a collaboration of two programs, EXILE THE SECOND THE ON ~Sound~ (EXILE THE SECOND THE ON ~音~) with Nesmith and SPYAIRのPUMP UP ONE with Kenta. On May 18, he performed at the opening ceremony of WE=KYUSHU Day in KUMAMOTO (WE=KYUSHU デー in KUMAMOTO), a festival to celebrate the 30th anniversary of the Hawks Kyushu - Fukuoka relocation and the opening of KAB!.

== Participating groups ==
Name	Period of time
Steel	2001 – 2002
Nidaime J Soul Brothers	25 January 2007 – 1 March 2009
Exile	1 March 2009 –
Exile The Second	1 July 2012 –
Dance Earth Party	2013 – 2014

== Discography ==
=== Singles ===
Year	Title	Release date
2006	Tsuishin (追伸)	April 12

=== Lyrics ===
Year	Song	Artist	Single/album
	My Place	Nidaime J Soul Brothers	My Place
	Dear...	The Second from Exile	The II Age

=== Participating works ===
Year	Song	Artist(s)	Work
2000	Saigo no Yoru	ASAYAN Chou Danshi	Dochin-Nesmith "Saigo no Yoru / I'll Be There"
2000	I'll Be There	ASAYAN Chou Danshi	Dochin-Nesmith "Saigo no Yoru / I'll Be There"
2000	Saigo no Yoru	ASAYAN Chou Danshi	Nesmith-Fujioka "Saigo no Yoru / Stand By Me"
2000	Stand By Me	ASAYAN Chou Danshi	Nesmith-Fujioka "Saigo no Yoru / Stand By Me"
2005	No Lady No Life	Ketsumeishi	Ketsu no Police 4
2006	Love Dream & Happiness	Exile	Asia
2006	Batch Goo Lady feat. Skillaw & Miyabi & Nesmith	DJ Shibuchin	SJ Shibuchin presents...Shibuchin Summit
2007	Lovers Again -The Finalist Version-	Exile	Lovers Again (Single)
2007	Song Soldier –Ashita no Senshi–	Dreamers –Exile Vocal Battle Audition Finalist–	Song Soldier –Ashita no Senshi– (Single)
2007	Song Soldier –Ashita no Senshi– Nesmith Version	Dreamers –Exile Vocal Battle Audition Finalist–	Song Soldier –Ashita no Senshi– (Single)
2013	Inochinoism	Dance Earth Party	Inochinoism (Single)
2013	Sen-ka no Chikyū de	Dance Earth Party	Inochinoism (Single)
2017	Inochi no Rhythm ~Great Journey~	Dance Earth Party, Crystal Kay	I
2018	Kanojo no "Modern..."	Glay	Urei no Prisoner / YOUR SONG

== Filmography ==
=== TV programmes ===
Year	Title	Network	Notes	Ref.
2000	Asayan	TV Tokyo		
2012	EX-Lounge	TBS	MC	
2019	Defeat Times	Fuji TV	guest in one episode	
2019	NES-FES.	TV Kumamoto	MC	

=== Films ===
Year	Title	Role
2003	Hotel Hibiscus	Kenji Nyinyi

=== Stage ===
Year	Title	Role
2010	Dance Earth: Negai	Josh
2013	Dance Earth: Seimei no Kodō	Wadamasa

=== Musical ===
Year	Title	Role
2019	Peter Pan	Captain Hook

=== Radio ===
Year	Title	Network	Notes
2012	Exile Nesmith no All Night Nippon	NBS	
2019	English arc presents Shigeki Maruyama MOVING SATURDAY	TOKYO FM	guest for 3 weeks
2019	EXILE THE SECOND THE ON ~Sound~	TS ONE	MC

=== Live ===
Year	Title	Ref.
2012	VBA Live Tour 2012 Vocal Battle Stage	
2014	Vocal Battle Audition Presents "Vocal Battle Stage 2014"	
2019	THE PUMP UP ON	

=== Advertisements ===
Year	Title
2013	Daiichi Kosho Company "Smart Dam"

=== Others ===
Year	Title	Notes	Ref.
2014	Dam Channel	MC	

== Bibliography ==
=== Manga ===
Year	Title	Notes
2011 - 2014	Examurai Sengoku G	Planning and draft

=== Magazine Photography Serialisations ===
Year	Title	Magazine	Notes	Ref.
2015 - 2017	"GIVE&TAKE"	with	Irregular series	
2018–present	"EXILE NESMITH portrait・Jiū「P.S.」"	Photo Technique Digital	series	
