= Hiroyuki Igarashi =

Japanese dancer and producer (born 1969)

Hiroyuki Igarashi 五十嵐 広行
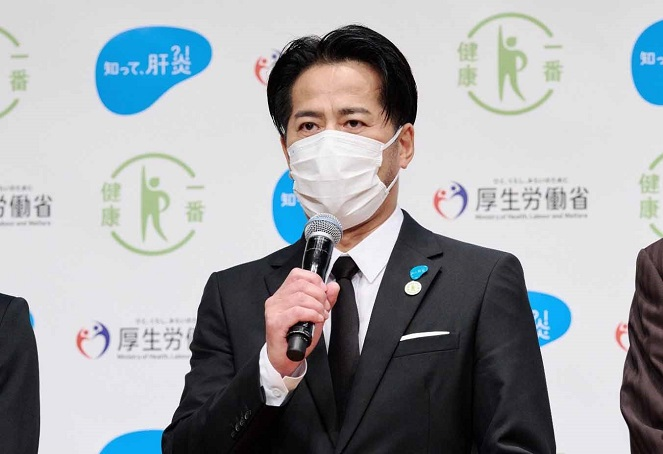
- Igarashi in 2022

Background information
- Born: 1 June 1969 (age 57); Takehara, Japan
- Occupations: Dancer; producer; businessman
- Years active: 1989–present
- Labels: LDH; Rhythm Zone
- Spouse: Aya Ueto (m. 2012)
- Website: Official website

Hiroyuki Igarashi (五十嵐 広行, Igarashi Hiroyuki; born on June 1, 1969), known as Hiro and Exile Hiro (stylized in all caps), is a Japanese dancer and producer. He is the leader of Exile and the creative leader of LDH World.

Igarashi grew up in Yokohama, Kanagawa Prefecture. (Note: When speaking at the Hiroshima Performance (23 to 24 May 2009, at the Hiroshima Green Arena), he said he was born as B Boy Salary Man in Kanagawa.) His wife is actress Aya Ueto. Igarashi retired from performing with Exile in 2013, and has concentrated on the producer industry since then.

== Early life ==
Hiroyuki Igarashi was born on June 1, 1969, in Takehara, Hiroshima Prefecture and grew up in Yokohama, Kanagawa Prefecture. He graduated from Yokohama City Hama Junior High School and Yokohama City Kanazawa High School. During his time in high school, he met Matsuura Masato, who was the manager of the rental record store “Tomo & Ai” in Kamiooka back then. After graduating from high school, Hiroyuki refined his dancing skills while working at Disco Maharaja and Circus in Roppongi.

In 1989, at the age of 20, the circus store manager asked Hiroyuki to advertise the store which led him to participate as the runner-up in the dance contest of the TV program “DADA”. The scout who was watching the contest suggested that Hiroyuki should become part of a dance team from the program, which led to the group LMD being formed.

== Career ==
In 1990, Hiro debuted as a member of the group LMD, modified as ZOO. In 1991, the dance team Japanese Soul Brothers was formed, which included Igarashi as a member. They participated in Bobby Brown's tour in Japan. In 1995, ZOO broke up. Following the disbandment, Hiro participated in DREAMS COME TRUE's tour as a back dancer. In 1996, the group LUV DELUXE was formed but dissolved the following year.

In 1999, Hiro founded the group J Soul Brothers. On August 24, 2001, J Soul Brothers changed their name to EXILE. On October 17, 2002, the group established Exile Entertainment Co., Ltd.. On September 18, 2003, LDH Co., Ltd. was established. On April 3, 2013, Hiro announced that he would retire from being a performer within the year and concentrate on the producer business. The “64th NHK Kohako Uta Gassen” on December 31 was his last activity as a performer. In 2014, PKCZ was formed.

In March 2015, he became a member of the Tokyo 2020 Culture and Education Commission. Later that year he was awarded the Commissioner for Cultural Affairs Award by the Japanese Government's Agency for Cultural Affairs for his contribution to Japan's artistic culture. On January 1, 2017, it was announced that Hiro would become the CCO of LDH WORLD. At the same time, he retired from his president position within LDH and became a chairman of the company.

On November 8, 2019, the Tokyo Organising Committee of the Olympic and Paralympic Games (Tokyo 2020) announced the appointment of Exile Hiro as the director of the Tokyo 2020 cultural segment of the Olympic Flame Handover Ceremony. The ceremony, during which the Olympic Flame will be passed from the Hellenic Olympic Committee to Tokyo 2020 representatives, will be held at the Panathenaic Stadium in Athens on 19 March 2020. After a cultural performance by Greek dancers and entertainers, the host country of Japan will stage its own cultural performance, under Hiro's direction. Hiro himself expressed his goal to center the performance on children, who embody Japan's hope for the future, and to make it the highest priority "that the children will experience something they can take with them for the rest of their lives and to have it be an experience that will inspire them to build a bright future together". The concept for the Tokyo 2020 Olympic Torch Relay will be: “Hope Lights Our Way”.

== Participating groups ==
Name	Period of time	Ref.
Zoo	1989 – December 25, 1995	
Luv Deluxe	1996 – 1997	
J Soul Brothers	1999 – August 24, 2001	
Exile	Since August 24, 2001	
PKCZ	Since 2014	

== Personal life ==
=== Marriage and family ===
On September 14, 2012, it was personally announced by Hiro and Aya Ueto that they registered their marriage after two years of dating. They had met through a mutual acquaintance, who was the dance instructor for the idol group Z-1 of which Aya was a former member.

On April 12, 2015, Aya Ueto revealed that she was pregnant with the couple's first child. Their first daughter was born on August 19, 2015. On June 12, 2019, it was announced via official news outlets that the couple were expecting their second child. On July 27, 2019, the birth of their second child, a boy, was announced. The couple welcomed their third child, a son, on June 22, 2023.

=== Other ===
On April 17, 2014, Hiro attended the "Spring Garden Party" hosted by the Emperor and Empress of Japan. On October 6 of the same year, he was invited to attend the wedding reception for Noriko Senge and Kunimaro Senge due to his friendship with the Senge family.

== Productions ==
=== Artists ===
- Exile
- Exile The Second
- Nidaime J Soul Brothers
- Sandaime J Soul Brothers from Exile Tribe
- Generations from Exile Tribe
- The Rampage from Exile Tribe
- Fantastics from Exile tribe
- Ballistik Boyz from Exile Tribe
- E-girls
- Happiness
- Flower
- SudannaYuzuYully
- ShuuKaRen
- Samurize from Exile Tribe
- PKCZ

=== Programmes ===
Title	Notes
Shūkan Exile	General producer

=== Manga ===
Title	Notes
Examurai Sengoku	Planning and draft
Examurai Sengoku G	Planning and draft

=== Anime ===
Title	Notes
Examurai	Planning and draft

=== Magazines ===
Title	Notes
Gekkan Exile	Editor-in-chief

=== Films ===
Title	Notes	Ref.
Tatara Zamurai	Executive producer	
Cinema Fighters	Short film	

=== Others ===
Title	Notes	Ref.
High & Low	Comprehensive entertainment project; planning producer	
2020 Summer Olympics Organizing Committee	Culture and Education Committee member	
2020 Summer Olympics Organizing Committee	Director of the cultural segment of the Olympic Flame Handover Ceremony	

== Works ==
=== Books ===
Year	Title	ISBN
2005	B Boy Salary Man	ISBN 978-4344007321
2009	B Boy Perfectly	ISBN 978-4344412705
2014	Bibiri	ISBN 978-4344025905
2018	Hiro in Exile: The Creation of a J-Pop Empire	ISBN 978-0847861613

=== Videography ===
Year	Title
2005	Zoo → JSB → Exile

=== Compositions ===
Artist	Album	Songs	Composed/arranged
Exile	our style	"J Soul Brothers"	Hiro & Kira
Exile	our style	"Max Tribe"	Hiro & Kira
Exile	our style	"Silver Cockpit"	Hiro & Kira
Exile	Styles Of Beyond	"Escape"	Hiro×(Kira + Okayan)
Exile	Styles Of Beyond	"S.O.B"	Hiro×(Kira + Okayan)
Exile	Exile Entertainment	"Exile Come"	Hiro & Kira
Exile	Exile Entertainment	"Road-Runner"	Hiro & Kira
Exile	Perfect Best Disc 2/Select Best	"Escape"	Hiro×(Kira + Okayan)

== Filmography ==
=== TV series ===
Year	Title	Network
2005	Shin Tokyo Hyakkei	Tokyo MX

=== Advertisements ===
Year	Title	Ref.
2009	Meiji Fran	
2010	Yomiuri Shimbun "Real no Chikara"	
2010	Toyota Wish	
2011	Ad Council Japan "Nihon no Chikara o, Shinji teru."	
2011	Fujitsu Arrows	
2012	Fujitsu FMV	
2015	Suntory The Malts	

=== Radio ===
Year	Title	Network
2001	Oh! My Radio	J-Wave

=== Awards ===
Year	Award	Ref.
2015	Agency for Cultural Affairs Commissioner Award	
