= FM Yokohama =

JOTU-FM
- Yokohama, Japan; Japan
- Broadcast area: Kanagawa Prefecture
- Frequency: 84.7 MHz
- Branding: FM Yokohama 84.7

Programming
- Language: Japanese
- Format: Talk, J-Pop
- Affiliations: independent

Ownership
- Owner: YOKOHAMA F.M. BROADCASTING Co., Ltd.

History
- First air date: December 20, 1985

Technical information
- Power: 5,000 watts (Yokohama), 100 watts (Odawara; Isogoku)
- ERP: 21,000 watts (Yokohama), 160 watts (Odawara), 720 watts (Isogoku)
- Translators: Odawara, Kanagawa 80.4 MHz; Isogoku, Yokohama 87.0MHz

Links
- Website: http://www.fmyokohama.co.jp

FM Yokohama 84.7 (FMヨコハマ) (FM Yokohama), also known as FM Yokohama, is a radio station based in Yokohama, Japan owned by the Yokohama FM Broadcasting Company, a joint venture of Nippon Broadcasting System, Kanagawa Prefectural Government and Bank of Yokohama. This station was featured in the Xbox game Project Gotham Racing 2.
