= Sandaime J Soul Brothers =

Japanese vocal and dance group

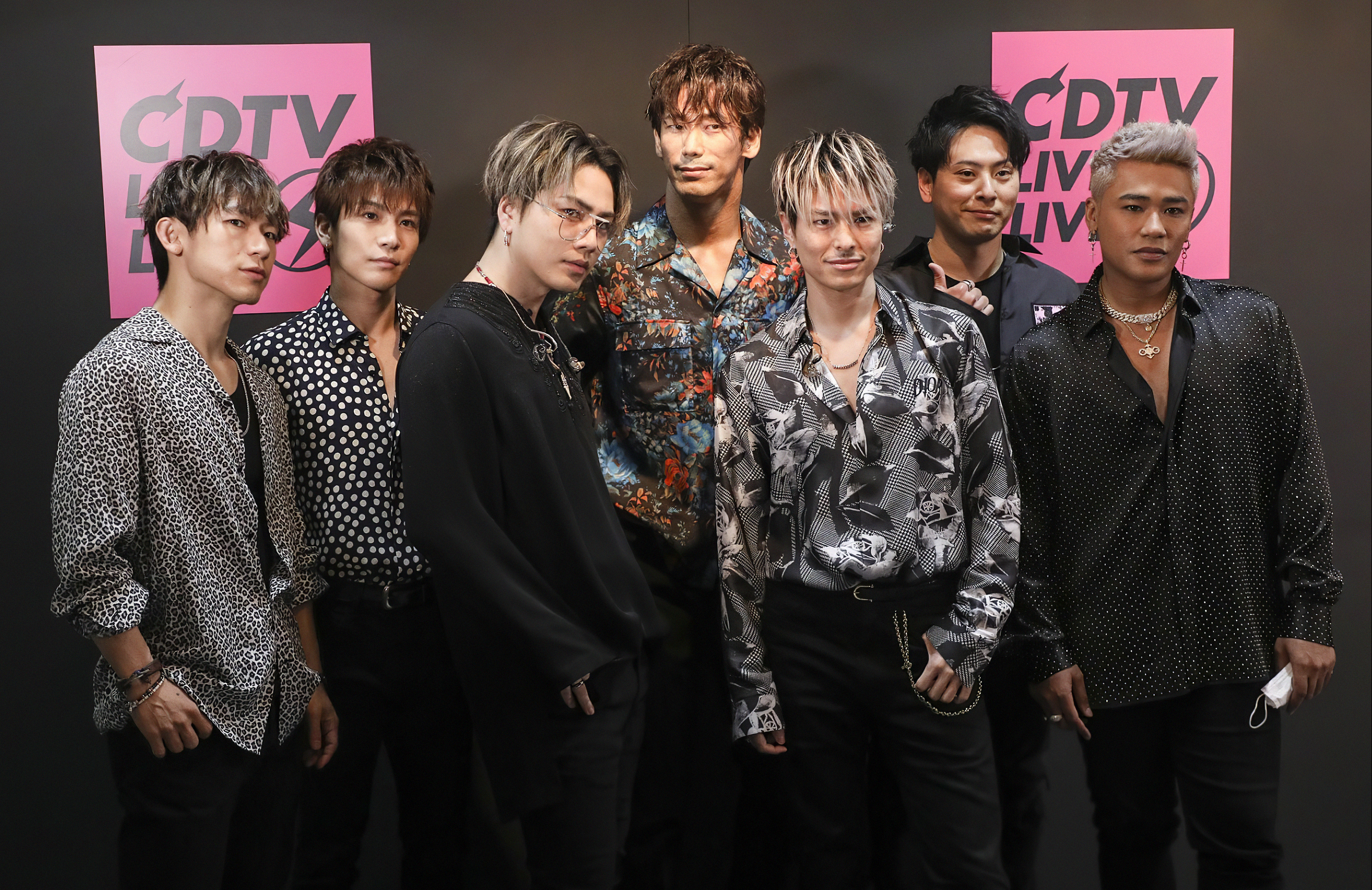
- From left to right: NAOTO, Takanori Iwata, Hiroomi Tosaka, Naoki Kobayashi, Ryuji Imaichi, Kenjiro Yamashita, ELLY.

Background information
- Also known as: 3JSB; 三代目JSB; J Soul Brothers III; The Third J Soul Brothers
- Origin: Tokyo, Japan
- Genres: J-pop; pop; dance; R&B; electronic; EDM; synth-pop
- Years active: 2010–present
- Labels: Rhythm Zone; LDH
- Members: Naoto; Naoki Kobayashi; ELLY; Kenjiro Yamashita; Takanori Iwata; Ryuji Imaichi; Hiroomi Tosaka
- Website: www.jsoulb.jp

Sandaime J Soul Brothers (Japanese: 三代目; Sandaime; "Third Generation"), formerly simply J Soul Brothers and also known as Sandaime J Soul Brothers from Exile Tribe, are a J-pop vocal and dance group formed by Exile ex-leader and producer Hiroyuki Igarashi in Japan in 1991. Sandaime J Soul Brothers are managed by Hiroyuki's talent agency LDH and are a part of the supergroup, Exile Tribe. Reformed exclusively by Exile's Vocal Battle Audition in 2010, Sandaime J Soul Brothers released their first single "Best Friend's Girl" in November 2010, which peaked at number three on the Oricon Singles Chart. Their self-titled debut album J Soul Brothers, released in 2011, also peaked at number three. In 2013, they achieved their first number-one record with their third album Miracle.

Sandaime J Soul Brothers were propelled to commercial and critical success following the release of their 2014 single "R.Y.U.S.E.I.", which won the Japan Record Award, the highest honor at the 56th Japan Record Awards. The group's fifth studio album Planet Seven was the second best-selling Japanese album and the third best-selling Asian album of 2015, selling a total of 871,000 physical copies in Japan alone. The album would later attain a Million certification by the RIAJ for having over one million physical copies sold. Additionally, Recochoku revealed the group as the best selling artist of the year with R.Y.U.S.E.I reported as the best selling song for both Recochoku and Billboard year end charts.

By December 2019, Sandaime J Soul Brothers had sold a total of more than 11.15 million records including over 7.25 million singles sales in Japan alone since their debut in late 2010. The group was reported to have earned an estimated total gross of $63.1 million (¥6.85 billion) in 2015 with a total of $76 million (¥8.25 billion) and $53.6 million (¥5.82 billion) earned in the years of 2016 and 2018 respectively.

== History ==
=== 1991–2001: Group origins ===
Hiroyuki Igarashi, who debuted as a member of pop music group Zoo in 1989, first conceptualized the idea of a vocal and dance unit called Japan Soul Brothers in 1991. When ZOO disbanded in 1995, Hiroyuki formed J Soul Brothers, and they released their first self-titled single in 1999. J Soul Brothers halted activities following the departure of their vocalist Sasa in 2001, who wanted to pursue a solo career. The remaining members of J Soul Brothers then changed the group's name to Exile. The reformation into a new group marked the cessation of activities by the original J Soul Brothers before the group would be rebooted for a second generation in 2007.

=== 2007–2009: Second generation and lineup changes ===
In January 2007, Exile announced that it would hold an audition to recruit new members for the second generation of J Soul Brothers. Nesmith and Shokichi, finalists of the Exile Vocal Battle Audition, were the first members to join the new generation in August 2007. Performers Kenchi, Keiji, and Tetsuya were soon added. Three months later, performers Naoto and Naoki were added, and they gave their debut performances at Color's 2007 nationwide tour, Live Tour 2007: Blue. The second generation, called the Nidaime J Soul Brothers, released their debut single "We!" in May 2008 under the indies label, Rhythm Republic. Nidaime J Soul Brothers announced their hiatus after the release of their first self-titled album J Soul Brothers in February 2009. A month later, the Nidaime members joined the lineup of Exile. Members Naoto and Naoki stayed behind to re-join J Soul Brothers' third generation.

=== 2010: Sandaime J Soul Brothers' debut ===
In July 2010, Japanese music dance group Exile announced on their variety show Shuukan EXILE that the J Soul Brothers would be returning with new members. The new generation, called Sandaime J Soul Brothers, would be led by Exile members Naoto and Naoki Kobayashi, both who were also members of the previous J Soul Brothers lineup. ELLY, a member of the Exile theater group Gekidan EXILE, was announced to be the first new member.

To select a main vocalist for the group, Exile monitored the contestants in the singing competition, Vocal Battle Audition 2. Created by Exile's Hiro in 2006, the Vocal Battle Audition is held every few years to find new talents for their management agency, LDH. Ryuji Imaichi from Kawasaki participated in the first Vocal Battle Audition in 2006, but failed to pass the second screening. Imaichi tried his luck again four years later with the second series of Vocal Battle Audition, auditioning against 30,000 applicants. He finished first place with Hiroomi Tosaka from Tokyo.

In September 2010, Exile confirmed the final new members of Sandaime J Soul Brothers at their concert in Aichi: Gekidan EXILE member Kenjiro Yamashita, new recruit Takanori Iwata, and Vocal Battle Audition 2 winners, Imaichi and Tosaka. Exile then revealed that the new group were in the midst of preparing two debut singles.

Sandaime J Soul Brothers released their debut single, "Best Friend's Girl", on November 10, debuting at number three on the Oricon Singles Chart. It was used as a theme song for Meiji Meltykiss. The single was mildly successful, selling about 83,000 physical copies by 2011. However, the single was more well-received digitally, and went to receive the platinum digital certification by the RIAJ in 2013.

Their second single "On Your Mark ~Hikari no Kiseki~", released on December 1, also debuted at number three. It was used as the opening theme song for the Japanese television drama Kenji Kijima Heihachiro and sold about 59,000 physical copies.

=== 2011–2013: J Soul Brothers, Tribal Soul and Miracle ===
In May 2011, Sandaime J Soul Brothers released their third single "Love Song". Debuting at number seven and selling only about 44,000 copies, it was the group's lowest-selling single. Despite the slow decline in sales, the group released their debut studio album, self-titled J Soul Brothers, to mild commercial success in June 2011. The album debuted at number three on the Oricon Albums Chart, selling 93,548 copies in the first week of release. It charted for 30 weeks, selling 137,366 physical copies by the end of the year. From 28 June 2011, alongside Nidaime J Soul Brothers, Sandaime J Soul Brothers held their first tour, Exile Tribe Nidaime J Soul Brothers VS Sandaime J Soul Brothers Live Tour 2011 〜Inheritance〜, attracting 150 thousand audiences with 15 shows in 2 cities.

In July, 2011, LDH announced that Sandaime J Soul Brothers would perform the theme song for the Japanese television drama Rokudenashi Blues, a live adaptation of the manga series of the same name. A series of PVs for the drama, titled "Fighters", was revealed online. The single was released on September 7, and became the group's first single to debut at number one on the Oricon Singles Chart, selling 83,000 copies on the first week. Their fifth single "Refrain", released in November 2011, and debuted at number two.

Sandaime J Soul Brothers' second studio album, Tribal Soul, was released in December 2011. It debuted at number two and charted for 45 weeks, selling 156,894 physical copies.

The group released three singles in 2012, all debuting at number three on the Oricon Singles Chart. Their seventh single "0 ~Zero~", which included Sandaime J Soul Brothers' major hit "Hanabi", was released in August 2012, which became their first single to sell over 100,000 copies. In September, Sandaime J Soul Brothers held their first solo tour, Sandaime J Soul Brothers Live Tour 2012 '0～ZERO～'. At the end of the year, they appeared for the first time on the stage of NHK Kohaku Uta Gassen with their single "Hanabi.

On January 1, 2013, Sandaime J Soul Brothers released their third studio album, Miracle, which became their first album to debut at number one on the Oricon Albums Chart and received a platinum certification by the RIAJ, selling 264,345 copies.

=== 2014–2015: R.Y.U.S.E.I and Planet Seven ===
In 2014, Sandaime J Soul Brothers' first best-of album and fourth original album The Best／Blue Impact topped Oricon Single Charts for four continual weeks after release on 1 January. Their second solo tour Sandaime J Soul Brothers LIVE TOUR 2014 BLUE IMPACT was held from January 8 to April 20 and attracted more than 400.000 attendants during 34 shows. In February, LDH announced that Sandaime J Soul Brothers would release a four "seasonal" single series from the beginning of the year till the very end of it with each single representing the spring, summer, fall and winter seasons thorough the year. The first single "S.A.K.U.R.A" was released in March 2014 and debuted at number two on the Oricon Singles Chart.

During the following months it was revealed that the group went to Los Angeles for the shooting of the MV of the new single. Producer STY was accredited with the production of the song and member ELLY made the choreography. Their new single "R.Y.U.S.E.I" was set to be released on June 25. The song topped the Oricon Single Charts at number one selling 162,174 copies on its first week. "R.Y.U.S.E.I" gained media attention for its different approach, visuals and refreshing EDM style which earned recognition to Sandaime J Soul Brothers for the following months until their nomination to the Japan Record Award, later winning the highest honor and skyrocketing the group to mainstream success for its following year too. Besides, with their video album for live tour 2014 "Blue impact" released on the same day with "R.Y.U.S.E.I" in both DVD and Blu-ray, they became the third artists in history to gained three No.1 in the same week on Oricon's Charts.

After their return to Japan, Sandaime J Soul Brothers released their next single C.O.S.M.O.S. ~Akizakura~ (秋桜) on October 15. The single sold a total of 147,059 on its first month and went gold on digital sales. Finally O.R.I.O.N, the last single for the winter season was released. O.R.I.O.N topped both Recochoku and iTunes weekly single charts in its first week of release, and ranked #2 in Oricon weekly single chart, selling 190,261 physical copies.

In late December the details of their new album were released. The album would be titled PLANET SEVEN and it would be released on January 28, 2015 JST. In 2015 Sandaime J Soul Brothers's fifth studio album PLANET SEVEN was released in five editions and sold 508,337 on its first week once again gaining the number one spot at the Oricon Album Charts. PLANET SEVEN stayed in the top five position for over a month and amassed at total of 855,215 physical copies sold and was certified for selling 1 million copies by the RIAJ.

In March 2015 it was revealed that the group would release two new singles in the month of April. The first single "starting over" sold 439,067 copies on its first week. The latter major maxi single STORM RIDERS featured Guns N' Roses guitarist Slash. The song sold 107,685 copies on its first week too. Additionally the group released a promotional music video for the B-side track "J.S.B Dream" to promote the launch of their website and clothing apparel brand JSB. From May 2015, Sandaime J Soul Brothers started their first dome tour, Sandaime J Soul Brothers Live Tour 2015 Blue Planet，which attracted more than 1.2 million audiences.

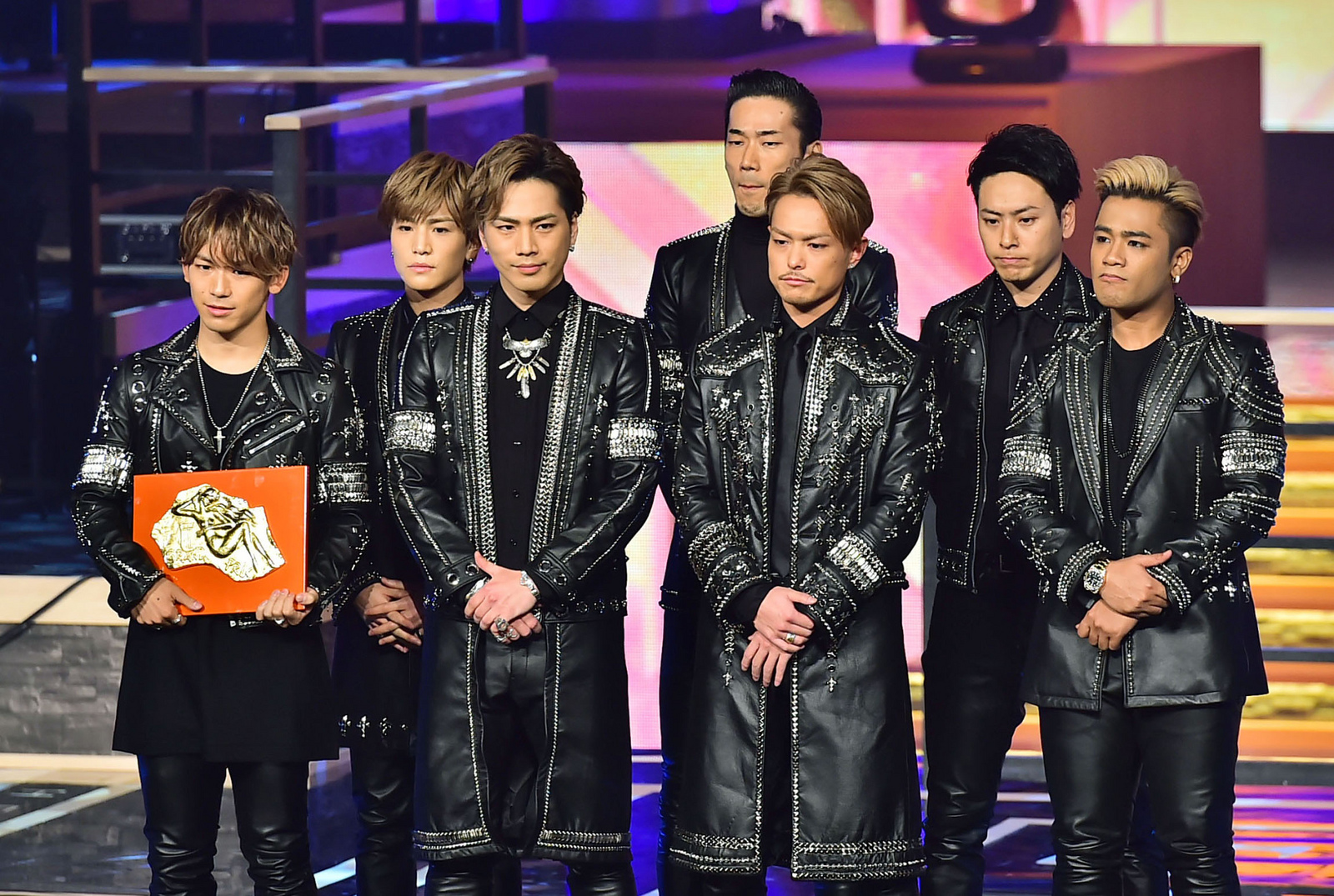
Sandaime J Soul Brothers receiving their second Japan Record Awards Grand Prize in December, 2015

On July 8 Sandaime J Soul brothers was set to release their new single "Summer Madness" which was a collaboration with DJ and producer Afrojack. Previous collaborator STY also took part on the production of the song. "Summer Madness" sold 194,883 copies on its first week and remained on the Oricon charts for the next four weeks.

The song was also featured on the set of Afrojack at Ultra Music Festival Japan. Ultimately the single sold a total of 233,768 physical copies and was certified double platinum by the RIAJ for both digital and physical sales.

Almost two weeks after releasing 'Summer Madness' Sandaime announced their next single titled "Unfair World" which was tied up with the movie UNFAIR. The song would be a ballad, meaning it would be around a year since their last ballad C.O.S.M.O.S. ~Akizakura~ (秋桜). On 2 September "Unfair World" was released selling 179,822 copies on its first week and selling a reported total of 204,588 copies. The song was later nominated at the Japan Record Awards for the grand prize which the group won with an excellence award in addition. This was the second year in a row Sandaime J Soul Brothers won the top award over other veteran artists such as AKB48, Kyary Pamyu Pamyu and AAA.

=== 2016–2017: The JSB Legacy, The JSB World and solo activities ===
In early 2016, it was announced that a documentary film featuring the members of Sandaime J Soul Brothers would be screened in major theaters in Japan on 12 February. The documentary titled "Born in the EXILE" would include footage from their previous 'BLUE PLANET' tour as well as extra footage describing the group's history and the members outlook on their activities and grow so far as a group. A song under the same title "Born in the EXILE" was used as the official theme song and was written and composed by both vocalists Hiroomi Tosaka and Ryuji Imaichi. In late February, Avex released a teaser through JSB's official website and YouTube announcing their new album titled THE JSB LEGACY. The album track list includes previous singles; "starting over", "Storm Riders", "Summer Madness" and "Unfair World". The album peaked at number one selling 476,120 copies on its first week and by the end of the year it sold 643,115 physical copies and was certified triple platinum for selling over 750,000 copies in total. The JSB Legacy is the fourth consecutive studio album by the group to chart at the top position on the charts. From July 22, 2016, they took part in the live tour High&Low The Live of the High & Low franchise, the action, and music franchise produced by the Exile Tribe(LDH).

On November 9, Sandaime's 20th single "Welcome to TOKYO" was released. This single would be their first and only to be released in 2016, a year and two months after their previous release "Unfair World" in September 2015. The single charted at number two on the weekly single charts selling 158,936 physical copies on its first week and also served as the theme song for the group's dome tour Metropoliz which was scheduled to take place between the end of 2016 and beginning of 2017.From November 2016, Sandaime J Soul Brothers held their second dome tour, Sandaime J Soul Brothers Live Tour 2016–2017 'Metropoliz'.

Following the beginning of 2017, the group's next single "Happy" was released on March 8. The announcement was sidelined with the release of Sandaime J Soul Brothers' second compilation album The JSB World. The album track list features all major singles from their debut, including B-side tracks and their latest single 'HAPPY'. From September, less than a month after their previous tour, Sandaime started third dome tour, Sandaime J Soul Brothers Live Tour 2017 'Unknown Metropoliz', which was wrapped up on a 10 day long continued performance at Tokyo Dome.

In March 2017 performer ELLY, released his first EP album Neotokyo digitally under the stage name "Crazyboy". The album topped iTunes weekly ranking on its first week. The album would be the first of a three part release followed by NEOTOKYO II and NEOTOKYO III. Vocalist Hiroomi Tosaka made his solo debut later on July 27 with his first digital single "Wasted Love" and a second digital single "Diamond Sunset". Both singles were produced by Afrojack and Fais. The singles topped iTunes' singles ranking.

Sandaime J Soul Brothers released their 22nd single "J.S.B. HAPPINESS" on December 13 along with their DVD live concerts of the group's tours in 2016 and 2017. "J.S.B. HAPPINESS" topped the Oricon Weekly Charts making this their 6th number one release since their debut. By the end of the year, Sandaime J Soul Brothers topped Nikkei Entertainment's 2017 Concert Mobilization Power Ranking, an annual ranking based on concert attendance in Japan. Over 1.8M people attended their 37 concerts throughout the year which gave them the #1 spot in the ranking.

=== 2018–2019: Future, Raise the Flag series ===
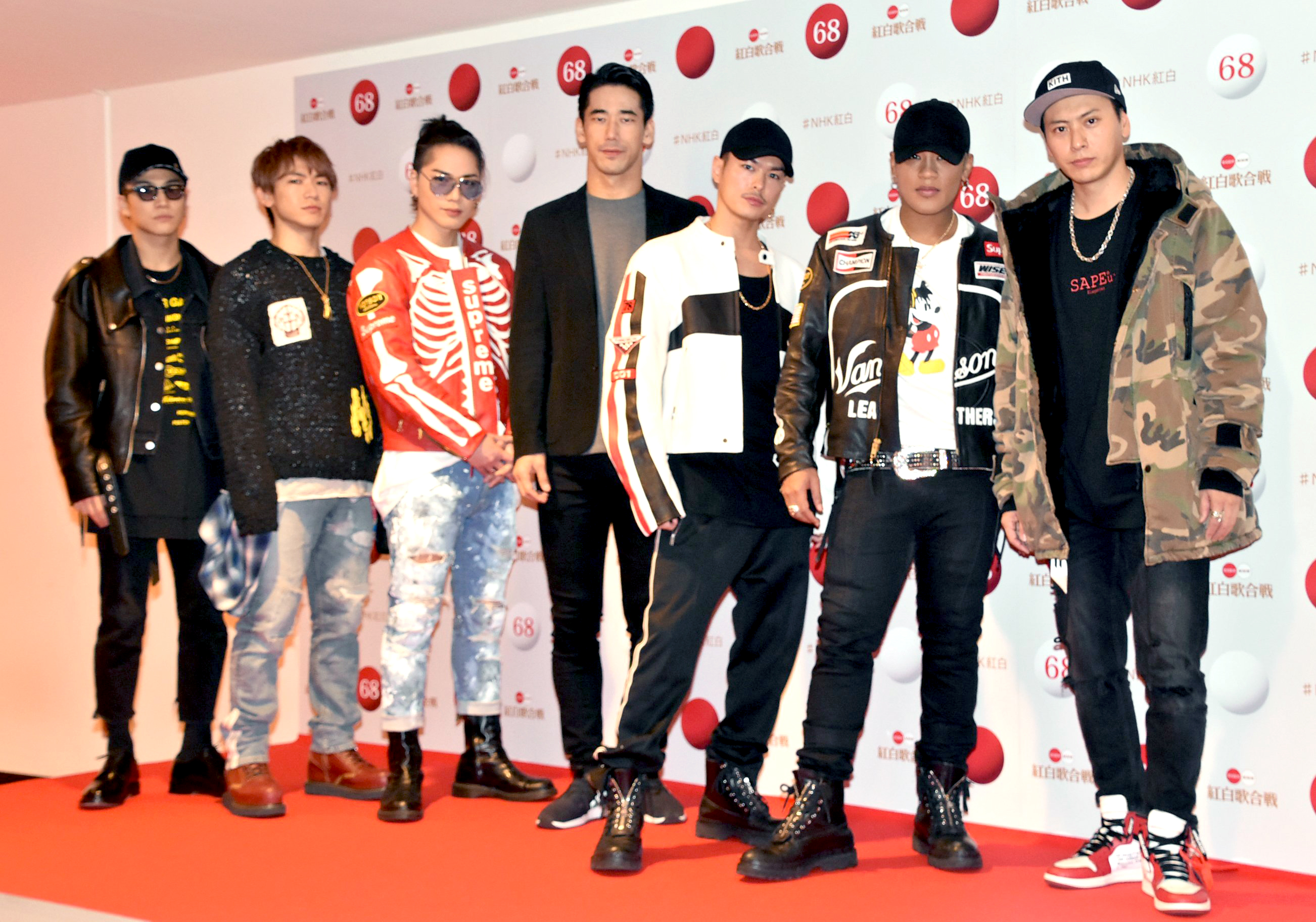
Sandaime J Soul Brothers at the 68th Kohaku Uta Gassen Festival.

In January 2018, it was announced the group would release the album Future, scheduled to be released in early summer. This would be their first studio album in two years since The JSB Legacy. Together with new songs, Future includes Hiroomi Tosaka's solo singles as well as Ryuji Imachi's debut.

On June 6, their seventh studio album Future was released. The album was their first studio album release in two years and peaked at number one on the weekly Oricon charts, making it their fifth consecutive album to do so. The album sold 181,550 copies on its first week and was certified platinum later on that month.

The group continued their solo activities later on the year with vocalists Hiroomi Tosaka and Ryuji Imaichi both releasing their first full studio albums, Tosaka's Full Moon and Imaichi's Light > Darkness. The albums peaked at number one and two respectively in the Oricon charts with a week time difference. Following the album releases, both vocalists embarked in their first solo tours starting in August and ending in December of the same year.

In January 2019, it was revealed Sandaime J Soul Brothers would release a series of singles throughout the new year as well as a new tour under the same project, titled Raise the Flag. The group premiered the music video for their first single "Yes We Are" on March 10 on a live press conference streamed worldwide across several social network services including YouTube, Facebook, Instagram, Twitter, Line, Weibo and LDH TV. During the event Sandaime confirmed they would release three color-themed singles, the first one "Yes We Are" being blue-themed, while the following two would be themed after the colors red and white accordingly. It was reported that a total of two million people watched the stream within its 30 minutes duration. "Yes we are" peaked at number 2 on the combined Oricon charts with a total of 93,660 points. On April 13, 2019, Sandaime J Soul Brothers' new dome tour 三代目 J SOUL BROTHERS LIVE TOUR 2019 "RAISE THE FLAG" began.

On August 3, 2019, the group revealed their second and red-themed single "SCARLET" during another live press conference which was streamed worldwide on different platforms and reached a total number of 1.2 million viewers. The title track of the new single, "SCARLET", was co-produced by Giorgio Tuinfort and Afrojack while its music video was shot at the Studio City hotel in Macau.

On September 18, 2019, it was announced that the group would release the digital single "Rat-tat-tat" on the next day. The digital release of "Rat-tat-tat" took the first spot on the iTunes singles chart in Japan. Sandaime held the final concert of their Sandaime J SOUL BROTHERS LIVE TOUR 2019 "RAISE THE FLAG" dome tour on November 17, finishing the tour with a total number of 1.15 million attendees since its start in April.

On December 11, 2019, Sandaime released their third and white-themed double A-side single "Fuyuzora / White Wings" as the last single of their color series. The single peaked at number 2 on the Oricon rankings with a total of 53,260 points. On December 31, the group took part in "LDH PERFECT YEAR 2020 COUNTDOWN LIVE 2019▶2020" at Fukuoka YAHUOKU! DOME on December 31.

=== 2020–present: 10th anniversary and Live×Online ===
On March 18, 2020, the group released their 8th studio album titled Raise The Flag. It included all tracks from their previous singles, alongside "Tokyo" which is the theme song for the movie "Utamonogatari -Cinema Fighters project-". On March 23, 2020, the group unveiled the music video for their new single "Movin' on" to celebrate their 10th debut anniversary, the single was released on April 8.

From June 30, the group revived their first radio program Keep On Dreaming on EXILE TRIBE mobile, while a video version of the radio would be released on LDH streaming services CL. On August 3, the group released digital single "starting over 〜one world〜", which is a reproduction of their single "starting over" with the remix of voices of their fans.

Due to the COVID-19 pandemic, their 2021 live tour Sandaime J SOUL BROTHERS PERFECT LIVE 2010→2020 was canceled. In compensation, Sandaime held a series of livestreamed concerts on the Japanese streaming platform AbemaTV from July to December. LIVE×ONLINE Sandaime J SOUL BROTHERS was held on July 7, Tanabata of Japan, and LIVE×ONLINE IMAGINATION Sandaime J SOUL BROTHERS was held on September 26. On November 10, they held LIVE×ONLINE "JSB HISTORY" to celebrate the 10 anniversary of their debut. They also held a Christmas Concert titled "Sandaime J SOUL BROTHERS's Christmas Party" on December 24. On December 31, the group took part in the livestreamed concert of LDH artists,LIVE×ONLINE COUNTDOWN 2020▶2021"Rising Sun to the World" .

On January 1, 2021, the group released their new single "Rising Soul" in Exile Tribe's new single "Rising Sun to The World".

== Artistry ==
=== Music ===
Throughout their discography Sandaime J Soul Brothers have explored different genres on each of their albums ranging from soul and RnB to EDM, hip-hop and dubstep. Sandaime J Soul Brothers' debut single "Best Friend's Girl" and their subsequent releases from their first two albums "J Soul Brothers" and "Tribal Soul" were predominantly influenced by R&B and soul. Their first number one single "Fighters" from their second album was one their first A-side tracks featuring an uptempo rock style distinctly similar to their senior label-mate group Exile whose leader Hiro oversaw the production of the first two albums with already well established producers such T.Kura and Michico. Their third studio album "Miracle" noticeably rebounds from earlier genres as it integrates faster uptempo songs "Look @ Us Now" and "Let's Party", both tracks being produced again by producer duo T.Kura and Michico. In addition to being their first number one album, "Miracle" featured the critically acclaimed track "Hanabi" which would eventually earn Sandaime J Soul Brothers public notoriety and their first appearance at the prestigious NHK's year-end show Kohaku Uta Gassen. Hanabi was written from a relationship's female perspective and it explores themes of break up, loss and coming-of-age represented on the summer season ending. These themes would later be prominent on future ballads performed by the group.

"Feel So Alive" (2016)
"Feel So Alive" primarily a hip-hop song was partly written by member Elly. Along with his vocals the song features an under-carried trap sound and a heavy use of EDM.

"Break Of Dawn" (2016)
Along with hip-hop brostep and dubstep music, the group has irregularly included a considerable amount of synth-sampled vocal choruses as seen on other tracks like "Summer Madness".

Following the release of their first best of album and fourth studio album "The Best/Blue Impact" the group's consequent album "Planet Seven" was a turning point musically and commercially. Selective Hearing's website said "[the album] follows the trend of going into EDM for the music. There are few traces of the R&B, Hip-Pop and Soul found on their previous outings. That could be disappointing for fans that expect the "soul" part of the group's name to be fulfilled. But that doesn't mean that this full of similar sounding, generic dance tracks. The familiar stamp of the J Soul Brothers is still there." The Japan Times' Ronald Taylor described the group's sound and image as "slick, western pop-influenced" in-pair with the group's labelmates E-girls and Exile. The group further continued mixing other genres such as hip-hop and trap. In addition, lead performer ELLY participated in the composition and recording of releases like "Feel So Alive" and "J.S.B Love", both tracks featuring hip-hop and EDM influences that bent the dynamic of the group more towards an urban sound. Just like other critics claimed previously The Japan Times again highlighted the group's "foray into more urban-influenced electronic music is a nice nod to the group's past, back when they were less pop and more R&B, but still keeps them firmly in the present."

== Members ==
- Naoto (片岡直人)
- Naoki Kobayashi (小林直己)
- Elly (エリオット・ロシャード・昂矢)
- Kenjiro Yamashita (山下健二郎)
- Takanori Iwata (岩田剛典)
- Ryuji Imaichi (今市隆二)
- Ømi (登坂広臣)

== Discography ==
2nd generation albums

- J Soul Brothers (Note: Known as Nidaime J Soul Brothers, the second generation of the group released one album before the current lineup was formed.) (2009)

Studio albums

- J Soul Brothers (2011)
- Tribal Soul (2012)
- Miracle (2013)
- Blue Impact (2014)
- Planet Seven (2015)
- The JSB Legacy (2016)
- Future (2018)
- Raise the Flag (2020)
- This Is JSB (2021)
- Land of Promise (2024)
- Echoes of Duality (2024)

Compilation albums

- The Best (2014)
- The JSB World (2017)
- Best Brothers (2021)

== Other ventures ==
Sandaime J Soul Brothers have appeared in several advertisements and television commercials throughout their career. Nike, All Nippon Airways, Samantha Thavasa and Glico are among many important brands and companies involved with public merchandising supported by the group.

=== Subunit ===
In late 2015, members Hiroomi Tosaka, Naoki Kobayashi and Takanori Iwata were endorsed in a promotional campaign with Glico's Pocky product line. The members formed the sub unit called THE Sharehappi from Sandaime J Soul Brothers and released the digital single 'Share The Love' as a commercial song for the endorsement. 'Share The Love' topped the Japanese iTunes store for four weeks and was certified platinum by the RIAJ.

Title	Album details	Peak positions	Certifications
Title	Album details	JPN	Certifications
"Share The Love"	Released: October 15, 2015 iTunes; Label: Rhythm Zone; Formats: Digital download	1	RIAJ: Platinum

== Tours ==
Headlining

- 三代目J Soul Brothers LIVE TOUR 2012「0～ZERO～」 (2012)
- 三代目J Soul Brothers LIVE TOUR 2014 "Blue Impact" (2014)
- 三代目J Soul Brothers LIVE TOUR 2015 "Blue Planet" (2015)
- 三代目J Soul Brothers LIVE TOUR 2016-2017 "METROPOLIZ" (2016-17)
- 三代目J Soul Brothers LIVE TOUR 2017 "UNKNOWN METROPOLIZ" (2017)
- 三代目 J SOUL BROTHERS LIVE TOUR 2019 "RAISE THE FLAG" (2019)
- 三代目 J SOUL BROTHERS LIVE TOUR 2021 "THIS IS JSB" (2021)
- 三代目 J SOUL BROTHERS LIVE TOUR 2023 "STARS" ~Land of Promise~

Joint tours

- 二代目J Soul Brothers VS 三代目J Soul Brothers Live Tour 2011 ～EXILE TRIBE～ (2011)
- EXILE TRIBE LIVE TOUR 2012 ～TOWER OF WISH～ (2012)
- EXILE TRIBE PERFECT YEAR 2014 SPECIAL STAGE "THE SURVIVAL"IN SAITAMA SUPER ARENA 10DAYS (2014)
- EXILE TRIBE PERFECT YEAR LIVE TOUR TOWER OF WISH 2014 〜THE REVOLUTION〜 (2014)

== Livestreamed Concerts ==
Headlining

LIVE×ONLINE Sandaime J SOUL BROTHERS(July 7, 2020)

LIVE×ONLINE IMAGINATION Sandaime J SOUL BROTHERS(September 26, 2020)

LIVE×ONLINE "JSB HISTORY" (November 10, 2020)

"Sandaime J SOUL BROTHERS's Christmas Party"(December 24, 2020)

Joint

LIVE×ONLINE COUNTDOWN 2020▶2021"Rising Sun to the World" .(December 31, 2020)

== Awards and nominations ==
Year	Ceremony	Award	Nominated work	Result
2011	MTV Video Music Awards Japan	Best New Artist	"On Your Mark (Hikari no Kiseki)"	Nominated
2012	MTV Video Music Awards Japan	Best Pop Video	"Fighters"	Won
2012	54th Japan Record Awards	Excellent Work Award	"Hanabi" (花火)	Won
2012	54th Japan Record Awards	Grand Prix	"Hanabi" (花火)	Nominated
2013	MTV Video Music Awards Japan	Best Group Video	"Hanabi" (花火)	Won
2013	MTV Video Music Awards Japan	Best Karaokee! Song	"Hanabi" (花火)	Nominated
2014	47th Japan Cable Awards	Excellence Award	"R.Y.U.S.E.I."	Won
2014	56th Japan Record Awards	Excellent Work Award	"R.Y.U.S.E.I."	Won
2014	56th Japan Record Awards	Grand Prix	"R.Y.U.S.E.I."	Won
2015	Japan Gold Disc Award	Best Music Video Award	"J Soul Brothers LIVE TOUR 2014「BLUE IMPACT」"	Won
2015	MTV Europe Music Awards	Best Japanese Act	"PLANET SEVEN"	Nominated
2015	MTV Video Music Awards Japan	Best Group Video	"Eeny, meeny, miny, moe!"	Won
2015	MTV Video Music Awards Japan	Video Of The Year	"Eeny, meeny, miny, moe!"	Won
2015	Apple Music Best of 2015	Best Album	"PLANET SEVEN"	Won
2015	48th Japan Cable Awards	Excellence Award	"Summer Madness"	Won
2015	48th Japan Cable Awards	Grand Prize	"Summer Madness"	Won
2015	57th Japan Record Awards	Excellent Work Award	"Unfair World"	Won
2015	57th Japan Record Awards	Grand Prix	"Unfair World"	Won
2016	Japan Gold Disc Award	Best Music Video Award	"Sandaime J Soul Brothers LIVE TOUR 2015「BLUE PLANET」"	Won
2016	Japan Gold Disc Award	Best 5 Albums	PLANET SEVEN	Won
2017	Japan Gold Disc Award	Best 5 Albums	THE JSB LEGACY	Won

== Videography ==
DVDs

- 2013: Sandaime J Soul Brothers Live Tour 2012 0: Zero
- 2014: Sandaime J Soul Brothers Live Tour 2014 "Blue Impact"
- 2015: Sandaime J Soul Brothers Live Tour 2015 "Blue Planet"
- 2017: Sandaime J Soul Brothers Live Tour 2016-17 "Metropoliz"
- 2018: Sandaime J Soul Brothers Live Tour 2017 "Unknown Metropoliz"
