= LDH (company) =

Japanese management and entertainment company

LDH Japan
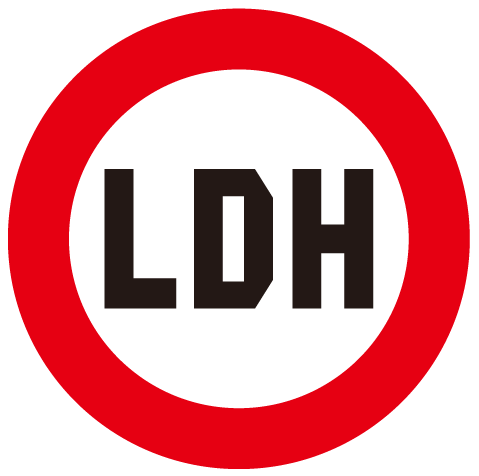
- Type: Kabushiki gaisha
- Industry: Talent management
- Founded: September 18, 2003; 23 years ago
- Headquarters: Meguro, Tokyo, Japan
- Key people: Hiroyuki Igarashi (president)
- Services: Artist management
- Subsidiaries: KOMA DOGG; CDL Entertainment; SUPERGENIUS Entertainment
- Website: www.ldh.co.jp

LDH JAPAN Inc. (株式会社LDH JAPAN, Kabushiki gaisha Eru Dī Eichi Japan) is a Japanese management and entertainment company founded by the six original members of Japanese boy group Exile in 2003. The president is Hiroyuki Igarashi, the leader of Exile. The name "LDH" is an acronym of "Love + Dream + Happiness". The company operates several boy bands and girl groups and a talent school named "EXPG".

In January 2017, the company changed its name to LDH Japan and established overseas branches in United States, Asia, and Europe. They established a new company called LDH World, the parent company of the four branches. For LDH World, Hiro took on the role of chief creative officer, while Verbal, NIGO and Dr. Romanelli (aka DRx) were appointed as executive creative directors. Masataka Mori was appointed as the CEO of LDH Japan, Makoto Matsuda as the CEO of LDH Asia, Afrojack as the CEO of LDH Europe and Hirotaka Mori as the CEO of LDH USA.

== Artists ==
=== Current ===
==== Groups ====
- Exile
- Exile The Second
- Sandaime J Soul Brothers from Exile Tribe
- Generations from Exile Tribe
- The Rampage from Exile Tribe
- Fantastics from Exile Tribe
- Ballistik Boyz from Exile Tribe
- Psychic Fever from Exile Tribe
- Lil League from Exile Tribe
- Kid Phenomenon from Exile Tribe
- The Jet Boy Bangerz from Exile Tribe
- Wolf Howl Harmony from Exile Tribe
- Deep Squad
- Doberman Infinity
- PKCZ(R)
- M-Flo
- Honest Boyz
- Samurize from Exile Tribe
- Dance Earth Party
- Girls²
- iScream
- Lucky²
- F5ve
- Rag Pound
- Kick & Slide
- 3 Lemon Siblings (Remon San Kyōdai; レモン三兄妹)
- MA55IVE THE RAMPAGE

==== Soloists ====
- Exile Atsushi
- Exile Takahiro
- Exile Shokichi
- Dream Ami
- Dream Shizuka
- Hiroomi Tosaka
- Ryuji Imaichi
- Takanori Iwata
- CrazyBoy
- Sway
- Verbal
- Crystal Kay
- Jay'ed
- Miyavi
- SG
- Sho Aoyagi
- Rei

==== Actors ====
- Akihisa Shiono
- Yuki Sakurai
- Kentaro Maeda
- Hayato Onozuka
- Kanta Sato
- Keita Machida
- Yuzuki Hirakawa
- Taichi Saotome
- Nobuyuki Suzuki
- Anna Ishii
- Nonoka Yamaguchi
- Karen Fujii
- Yuta Ozawa
- Shintaro Akiyama
- Masayasu Yagi
- Don Lee
- Sho Aoyagi
- MATSU
- Toshiki Noiri
- Kousei Amano
- Kyosuke Kurokawa

=== Former ===
==== Groups ====
- Dream
- E-girls
- Flower
- Happiness
- Love
- Moonchild (co managed by HYBE Labels Japan)
- lovely²
- Oha Girl from Girls² / Lucky²
- MABU
- mirage²
- NEVER LAND (Hip-hop Unit)
- Paradise Go!! Go!!
- Parc Manther
- Rather Unique
- Rootless
- ShuuKaRen
- SudannaYuzuYully

==== Soloists ====
- Yui Nakazaki
- Raine Kawane
- Sherry
- NaNa
- Kiko Mizuhara
- Ken Harada
- Ceyren
- Kouko
- Haru Natsuko
- ia
- Yuika Nakano
- Seira Yoshida
- Yosuke Isomura
- Rowland Kirishima
- Atsushi Yanaka
- Yosuke Kishi
- Mao Ueda
- Jun Hasegawa
- Jonte
- Breathe
- Kyosuke Harukawa
- Tatsuro Mashiko
- Akiko Monō
- Sayaka Shionoya
- Risa Matsumoto
- Rome Kanda
- Noma
- Tomohiro Nagatsuka
- Kei Otozuki
- Airi Kido
- Monica Sahara
- Shimada Zen
- Teresa Sakura
- Hiroyuki Takaya

== EXPG ==
EXPG Studio is a talent school that trains people who want to become artists in the field of dancing, singing, acting or modelling. The name "EXPG" is an acronym for "Exile Professional Gym", deriving from its founders.

The first EXPG Studio opened in October 2003 in Tokyo and since then the schools expanded around the globe. There are currently 12 schools at different locations in Japan, 3 schools located in other countries (2 in the USA and 1 in Taiwan) and an online school.

In 2019, LDH announced EXPG High School in collaboration with Kadokawa Dwango Gakuen N High School. The school allows pupils to earn a high school diploma while studying class. Exile Tetsuya serves as chancellor.
