= High&Low: The DTC =

2017 Japanese comedy streaming television miniseries

- Poster
- Genre: comedy
- Written by: Norihisa Hiranuma; Shôhei Fukuda; Daisuke Kamijô; Team HI-AX
- Directed by: Norihisa Hiranuma
- Composer: Yuta Nakano
- Country of origin: Japan
- Original language: Japanese
- No. of seasons: 1
- No. of episodes: 11

Production
- Executive producers: Kakuya Yamada; Hirotaka Mori; Gen Yagi; Yoshihiro Seki
- Producers: Hiroyuki Ueno; Naoto Fujimura; Norihisa Hiranuma; Chikako Nakabayashi
- Cinematography: Masaya Suzuki; Kazuhiro Taniguchi; Satoshi Furusawa
- Editor: Taro Inou

Original release
- Network: Hulu
- Release: Invalid date range

High＆Low The DTC is a Japanese comedy streaming television miniseries. It is a spin-off of the High&Low series, setting roughly after the story of High&Low The Movie, focusing on the casual and pleasant life of Sannoh Rengokai (Hoodlum Squad)'s member Dan, Tettsu, and Chiharu, who called themselves DTC. It was released on the streaming service Hulu in three parts, and the first three episodes were released on August 11, 2017.

High＆Low The DTC is directed by Norihisa Hiranuma, with starred by Kenjiro Yamashita, Kanta Sato, Taiki Sato starring as Dan, Tettsu and Chiharu, respectively. The series served as a heat-up for the upcoming High&Low film, High&Low The Movie 2 / End of Sky, while broadening the world of High&Low by emphasizing its comedy side.

== Synopsis ==
At Sannoh Rengokai (Hoodlum Squad)'s hang out place, diner Itokan, Dan, Tettsu, and Chiharu put on a comedy.

== Cast and characters ==
- Kenjiro Yamashita as Dan, a member of Sannoh Rengokai (Hoodlum Squad) and the "D" of DTC. Talking in Kansai dialect, he is a mood maker and is some the leader of DTC. He runs his family shop "Dan Shoten".
- Kanta Sato as Tettsu, a member of Sannoh Rengokai (Hoodlum Squad) and the "T" of DTC. He dreams of becoming a YouTuber and attracts the attention of girls.
- Taiki Sato as Chiharu, a member of Sannoh Rengokai (Hoodlum Squad) and the "C" DTC. After he joins Sannoh Rengokai (Hoodlum Squad), he quickly becomes friends with Dan and Tettsu.
- Shuuka Fujii as Naomi, who runs the diner "Itokan". She has a bitter tongue towards those boys, but she always treats their wounds gently.
- Nozomi Bando as Nika Ijuin, who does part-time jobs at diner "Itokan". She is sweet to DTC.

Masayasu Yagi plays Kabuto Ijuin, the so-called "Crabman ", and Kousei Amano plays Ozawa, who wants to be popular around girls more than anything. The two form the duet "Vertical Flute Brothers" . Takanori Iwata appears as Cobra, Keiji Kuroki appears as Rocky, Yuki Yamada appears as Yoshiki Murayama, Masataka Kubota appears as Smoky, Kento Hayashi appears as Norihisa Hyuga, they are the leaders of the SWORD gangs. Kaede plays Shiba, Harumi Sato plays Oshiage, Nonoka Yamaguchi plays Nonoriki, Airi Kido plays Ishikawa, they are members of the female gang Ichigo Milk. Keita Machida appears as Sannoh Rengokai (Hoodlum Squad)'s member Noboru.

Fumihiko Tachiki serves as the narrator of the series.

== Episodes ==
No.	Title	Directed by	Written by	Original release date
1	"We are DTC"	Norihisa Hiranuma	Norihisa Hiranuma, Shôhei Fukuda, Daisuke Kamijô, Team HI-AX	August 11, 2017
While DTC are deciding their logo, they want to find a new meaning for their team name...
2	"Hot Water"	Norihisa Hiranuma	Norihisa Hiranuma, Shôhei Fukuda, Daisuke Kamijô, Team HI-AX	August 11, 2017
When DTC are finding themselves something to drink, Chiharu argues why he wants to drink hot water...
3	"DTC's theme song"	Norihisa Hiranuma	Norihisa Hiranuma, Shôhei Fukuda, Daisuke Kamijô, Team HI-AX	August 11, 2017
DTC want to make a theme song for their team...
4	"Let's be a YouTuber."	Norihisa Hiranuma	Norihisa Hiranuma, Shôhei Fukuda, Daisuke Kamijô, Team HI-AX	August 18, 2017
DTC want to be Youtubers to make some money, but Tettsu have already found being a Youtuber too hard a thing to try...
5	"Nickname"	Norihisa Hiranuma	Norihisa Hiranuma, Shôhei Fukuda, Daisuke Kamijô, Team HI-AX	August 18, 2017
DTC want to get themselves some cool new nickname...
6	"Cheese Hamburger Meatloaf"	Norihisa Hiranuma	Norihisa Hiranuma, Shôhei Fukuda, Daisuke Kamijô, Team HI-AX	August 18, 2017
DTC discuss why there should be cheese inside cheese hamburger meatloaf...
7	"Quiz"	Norihisa Hiranuma	Norihisa Hiranuma, Shôhei Fukuda, Daisuke Kamijô, Team HI-AX	August 18, 2017
DTC have a quiz contest.
8	"The door to Youtuber"	Norihisa Hiranuma	Norihisa Hiranuma, Shôhei Fukuda, Daisuke Kamijô, Team HI-AX	August 25, 2017
Tettsu gets advices from girls of Ichigo Milk, who are successful Youtubers...
9	"Master Chiharu's cake divination"	Norihisa Hiranuma	Norihisa Hiranuma, Shôhei Fukuda, Daisuke Kamijô, Team HI-AX	August 25, 2017
Chiharu uses his cake divination technique to predict the type of woman a man likes.
10	"The discussion of Ichigo"	Norihisa Hiranuma	Norihisa Hiranuma, Shôhei Fukuda, Daisuke Kamijô, Team HI-AX	August 25, 2017
Girls of Ichigo Milk discuss that in the boys of SWORD gangs, who would be a perfect boyfriend.
11	"Vertical Flute Brothers"	Norihisa Hiranuma	Norihisa Hiranuma, Shôhei Fukuda, Daisuke Kamijô, Team HI-AX	August 25, 2017
Kabuto Ijuin and Ozawa form a duet, "Vertical Flute Brothers".

== Release ==
High＆Low The DTC was released on the streaming service Hulu in three parts, with Episodes 1,2,3 released on August 11, 2017, Episode 4,5,6,7 released on August 18, 2017, Episode 8,9,10,11 released on August 25, 2017.

In 2018, to celebrate the release of DTC -Yukemuri Junjou Hen- from High&Low, it was released on YouTube for free for a limited period. From July 20, 2018, to September 30, each episode became available on YouTube for 2 days.
