= High&Low The Movie 3 / Final Mission =

2017 Japanese action film

- Poster
- Directed by: Shigeaki Kubo; Tsuyoshi Nakakuki
- Screenplay by: Norihisa Hiranuma; Kei Watanabe; Shôhei Fukuda; Daisuke Kamijô; Team HI-AX
- Produced by: Hiroyuki Ueno; Naoto Fujimura; Norihisa Hiranuma; Chikako Nakabayashi
- Cinematography: Terukuni Ajisaka; Yasutaka Nagano; Shôhei Fukuda
- Edited by: Hikaru Yasuda
- Music by: Yuta Nakano; Agung Bagus; Kim Yuta
- Distributed by: Shochiku
- Release date: August 19, 2017
- Running time: 118 minutes
- Country: Japan
- Language: Japanese
- Box office: ¥1.31 billion

High&Low The Movie 3 / Final Mission (stylized as HiGH&LOW THE MOVIE 3 ／ FINAL MISSION) is a 2017 Japanese action film directed by Shigeaki Kubo and Tsuyoshi Nakakuki. It's the fourth film of the High&Low franchise, and as the final episode(the third film) focusing on the war between yakuza organization Kuryu Group and the SWORD gangs, it follows the story of High&Low The Movie, High&Low The Red Rain, and High&Low The Movie 2 / End of Sky. The fight the SWORD gangs are carrying on to protect their town is coming to an end, and they are working together to defeat the evil Kuryu Group thoroughly.

High&Low The Movie 3 / Final Mission was announced on March 18, 2017, alongside High&Low The Movie 2 / End of Sky, while It was also announced that the film will be released on November 11, 2017, after High&Low The Movie 2 / End of Sky's release in August. While High&Low The Movie has already been a film with a large number of characters, High&Low The Movie 2 / End of Sky and High&Low The Movie 3 / Final Mission add even more characters and cast to the series. The film's ensemble cast includes not only a large number of members of the Exile Tribe, Takanori Iwata, Akira, Sho Aoyagi, Keiji Kuroki, Takahiro, Hiroomi Tosaka and Naoto for examples, but also actors like Kento Hayashi, Masataka Kubota, and Yuki Yamada. After High&Low The Movie 3 / Final Mission is released, the High&Low series has featured more than one hundred characters.

The film premiered in Tokyo on October 31, 2017. It grossed 1.31 billion yen in Japan.

== Plot ==
The members of the SWORD gangs (Sannoh Rengokai (Hoodlum Squad), White Rascals, Oya Koukou (Oya High School), Rude Boys, and Daruma Ikka) joined forces to win the "Battle of Kokuhakudō Station" against the infamous Doubt and Prison Gang. However, just as it looks like the winner has been decided, Yoshitatsu Zenshin, who leads the Zenshinkai of Kuryu Group, barges into the scene.

The "power of adults" wielded by Kuryu Group was far more powerful than the SWORD gangs could have imagined. After being arrested once because of the confidential information in a USB device disclosed by Kohaku, Tsukumo, and the Amamiya brothers, who had risked their lives to do so, Ryushin Kuze, the president of Kuryu Group, is immediately released due to insufficient evidence. In order to devastate those rebellious youths, the entire Kuryu Group unites to carry out the "SWORD Destruction Action"...

Sannoh Rengokai (Hoodlum Squad)'s precious companions are hunted down and hung in their beloved local town. White Rascals are driven out of their precious castle club, HEAVEN, by the power of money, and both Oya Koukou (Oya High School) and the home of the Daruma Ikka are destroyed. To protect his companions, Cobra goes to challenge Kuryu Group to a fight on his own, but he is abducted and tortured. What's more, as instructed by Kuryu Group, heavy machinery enters the Nameless Street, aiming to destroy the town thoroughly. Smoky senses that his family is in danger, and tells everyone to run away, but he stays there alone to face the enemy.

Kuryu Group, colluding with the government, is planning to blow up the Nameless Street in the SWORD district and build a casino on the site to cover up misconduct of the government. Upon learning this fact, Kohaku sets out to rescue Cobra. Kohaku, Tsukumo, the SWORD gangs' members, and the Amamiya brothers, meet together to find the "three proofs" to expose the cover-up. They decide to crush Kuryu Group's ambitions forever.

"This is the last time we're going to fight!"

As the government's bombing ceremony in the SWORD area is about to begin, the youth of the SWORD gangs rush to carry out their "final mission" to beat the overwhelming strength of Kuryu Group.

The final battle of SWORD, which will be passed down as a legend, begins.

== Cast ==
- Takanori Iwata as Cobra, leader of Sannoh Rengokai (Hoodlum Squad), and a member of the former legendary gang Mugen. Though he always acts cool, he is a warm-hearted man deep inside. He respects Antonio Inoki as his hero and he always wears a red scarf like Inoki. He is determined to go all out to fight Kuryu Group, which develops a rift between him and the other members of the group. He rushes to help the ROCKY-led White Rascals when they were under attack and has an even fight with Prison Gang's Jesse. He shows his refusal to give in to the power of Kuryu Group as he eats a strong front kick from Yoshitatsu Zenshin, who suddenly barges into the brawl.
- Nobuyuki Suzuki as Yamato, a childhood friend of Cobra and Noboru. He leads Sannoh Rengokai (Hoodlum Squad) alongside Cobra as a second man, and he also joined Mugen together with Cobra in the past. He is strong, honest and serious, and the weight of his punch and his kick is second to none. He usually works at his family shop "Asahina Maintenance", fixing motorcycles. He rushes to save the White Rascals along with Cobra and Noboru. He goes toe-to-toe with Brown of Prison Gang, a knife-wielding man with great agility, and wins despite a wound on his hand.
- Keita Machida as Noboru, the brain of Sannoh Rengokai (Hoodlum Squad). He has been a top student since he was in elementary school, and therefore became the star of hope for his classmates Cobra and Yamato. During college, an incident led him off the road to a good life, and he joined Kuryu Group Iemurakai as a result. Being touched by his friends, he came to his mind and left Kuryu Group Iemurakai to reunite with his friend. He was seriously injured in the revenge of Kuryu Group, but he fully recovers now. In the fight against Doubt, he fights with Pho of Prison Gang. Though he majors in games of wits as a member of Sannoh Rengokai (Hoodlum Squad), he equals the gigantic Pho in the fight.
- Kenjiro Yamashita as Dan, the Sannoh Rengokai (Hoodlum Squad) member who talks in Kansai dialect. At present, he is the manager of "Dan Shoten" on the Sannoh shopping street, his parents' shop that sells everything. Worried about the reality of the Sannoh shopping street as a falling local shopping street, though he hates Kuryu Group as much as Cobra and others, he is interested in the economic effects of the proposed casino of Kuryu Group, which creates a groove in his relation to Cobra.
- Kanta Sato as Tettsu, the special attack captain of Sannoh Rengokai (Hoodlum Squad).With the hope to be popular around girls, he cuts his trademark dreadlocks and changes to a normal haircut, but now everyone says that they can't recognise him. His parents run a public bathhouse called "Yamanoyu". With his father's desire to continue the family business, he suffers from an inevitable dilemma of whether he should oppose the redevelopment plan of Kuryu Group after all.
- Taiki Sato as Chiharu, a member of Sannoh Rengokai (Hoodlum Squad). He joined Sannoh Rengokai (Hoodlum Squad) after they saved him from the trouble he accidentally caused on his first day at Oya Koukou (Oya High School). He has now fully absorbed the culture of Sannoh Rengokai (Hoodlum Squad), and he always hangs out with Dan and Tettsu. Therefore, he understands Dan and Tettsu's struggle and wonders whether they should fight Kuryu Group's redevelopment plan of the town.
- Keiji Kuroki as Rocky, leader of White Rascals. He lost his mother and sister because of the domestic violence of his father when he was young, which made him a man who could not stand any man hurting woman. Although he rarely expresses his emotions, his trust towards women is definite. He has a war with DOUBT and its leader Ranmaru Hayashi. As the biggest decisive battle with Kuryu Group begins, the sight of the injured members of the White Rascals makes him speechless.
- Yuya Endo as Koo, White Rascals' second man. He admires his boss Rocky, and he deeply loves the White Rascals who go to war with Doubt despite that it isn't their duty to do so. He's particular about his appearance and hates to have his hair and clothes in a mess. He has a good sense of humour, as when he sees P of Rude Boys gets into the brawl with DOUBT, he tells P that " You are off duty".
- Yuki Yamada as Yoshiki Murayama, leader of Oya Koukou (Oya High School). As a student of Oya Koukou's part-time school, he survived the brutal tests of receiving 100 punches from a selection of violent people of the school and therefore became its leader according to the rules of the school. As a result, he united Oya Koukou for the first time in its history. He is small and slender, but no matter how hard he has been beaten, he has the toughness and guts to rise up again. Therefore, he used to be unable to understand other people's pain, but after a man-to-man fight with Cobra, he began to grow up and care more for people around him. He is now proud of himself and his men for fighting with their fists and knowing their pain, and he hates people who hurt people on the internet.
- Masataka Kubota as Smoky, leader of Rude Boys. He was abandoned on the Nameless Street when he was a child and grew up on that hell-like street with other abandoned kids. With the agility and jumping power he trained himself to have for survival, he can parkour so fast that no one can catch up with him. Meanwhile, he is a good leader. Though he seems cool at first sight, he considers every people living in the Nameless Street as his family, and he is loved by his members and orphans in the Nameless Street as an older brother to them. He is terminally ill for some reason related to his upbringing.
- Reo Sano as Takeshi, the second man of Rude Boys. As an orphan, he is named Takeshi after Beat Takeshi by his friends because he can fight and parkour with beats. With his flexibility and instantaneous power, he can attack others freely like he is breakdancing. He is entrusted with the job as the new leader of Rude Boys by Smoky, who is dying from his illness, and he strives to fight for the future of the family.
- Karen Fujii as Lala. She was abandoned on the Nameless Street the same day as Smoky, and has lived with Smoky as his sister since then. She worries about her brother Smoky's worsen health, while the fact that Eri, the child she cares for as her little sister, begins to cough like Smoky, adds to her worries.
- Rio Suzuki as Eri, an orphan girl living on the Nameless Street. She begins to show symptoms similar to Smoky's deadly disease, which worries Lala and others.
- Kento Hayashi as Norihisa Hyuga, leader of Daruma Ikka. He is the youngest of the four Hyuga brothers, who used to lead a gang called Hyuga Ikka under Kuryu Group, but were crushed by Mugen. He is alive to clear his stigma and forms Daruma Ikka with those who have the same grudge against Mugen. As a man who has loved fighting since he was born, he can not stand losing, and he always claims that all festivals in the SWORD area should be controlled by Daruma Ikka. In fights, he often jumps from the height and attacks his enemy in surprise, and he fights like he can see the future. He calls the brawl between SWORD gangs and Kuryu Group a "festival", and he goes to "the festivals" on his reserved seat, the hood of an American car.
- Akira as Kohaku, leader of the former legendary gang Mugen, and the man who used to control the SWORD area. He was loved by his friends and his subordinates, but the death of his friend Tatsuya made him crazy. He was stimulated by Li from Chanson to try to take over the control of the SWORD area from the SWORD gangs, but at last his friend Tsukumo, Cobra and Yamato made him come to his sense and give up the vicious plan. In order to make the USB that the Amamiya Brothers entrusts him with public, he escaped the chase from Kuryu Group's assassin, Genji, and successfully accomplished his purpose. However, Ryushin Kuze, the president of Kuryu Group, is immediately released even with the proof in the USB.
- Sho Aoyagi as Tsukumo, Kohaku's right arm man and the vice-leader of the former Mugen. He was seriously hurt in a car accident and had been in a hospital bed for a long period without consciousness. After he regained consciousness, he joined Kohaku in revenging the SWORD, but he struggled to think whether Kohaku is the Kohaku he used to know. Finally, together with Cobra and Yamato, he helped Kohaku to regain his sense. He is a single-minded person who doesn't like difficult theories, and his principle of action is very simple. As Kohaku has now decided to do the right thing, he is determined to support Kohaku as far as possible.
- Takahiro as Masaki Amamiya. With only his brother Hiroto, he was able to take on 100 of the most fierce Mugen fighters. He is a master of Zero Range Combat, but he never uses the skill except for fights against men with firearms, and his fighting style is centered on kicking techniques. His high-striking kicks boast a destructive power that can demoralize an opponent in an instant. In contrast to his cool brother, he is surprisingly fond of women. He is also targeted by Kuryu Group as he tries to disclose the USB left by his older brother Takeru, but he and Kohaku successfully escape from their pursuers.
- Hiroomi Tosaka as Hiroto Amamiya, the youngest of the Amamiya Brothers. After his mother remarried into the Amamiya family when he was young, he changed his last name to Amamiya. At first, he did not open his heart as he considered that he is the only one of the brothers who is not related to the others by blood. However, as he learned about the truth of strength from his eldest brother Takeru, and as he clashed with his second oldest brother Masaki, they eventually formed a bond thicker than blood. He has a cool personality and often coldly dismisses Masaki 's unfunny gags, but in his heart, he deeply adores his two older brothers. When his brother Takeru died, he embraced Takeru's dead body and wept aloud. Also a user of Zero Range Combat, he is as well good at boxing styles and his fighting style focuses more on punches, and like his brother Masaki, he only uses zero range combat on men with firearms.
- Aoi Nakamura as Ranmaru Hayashi, leader of Doubt. Known as "Mad Dog", he is a cruel and ruthless man who has no mercy to his enemies, as well as his useless allies. Meanwhile, he believes that money can buy him everything. In the past, when he had a vicious turf war with White Rascals, he even hurt those policemen who came to stop the fight between the two gangs, and as a result, he was put into prison. After he is released from prison, he uses the money he acquires from somewhere to hire the Prison Gang he knew inside the prison to help him with the plan to take over the SWORD area.
- Elly as ICE, leader of Mighty Warriors. As a former mercenary, he boasts his overwhelming strength. He lived in a poor environment as a child, but his life changed when he encountered a discarded analog record. Since then, music and fashion become his relief. He has a dream of saving people with music, just like the way music has saved him. He is an old friend of Jesse, who taught him fashion, and he called Jesse his brother.
- Naoto as Jesse, leader of the strongest Prison Gang. A native of Little Asia, he is a fighting prodigy who has gathered together a group of fierce fighters from his hometown to form the most powerful Prison Gang ever. He is petite but has well-built muscles. With his incomparable speed and fighting sense, he can instantly knock out a giant. He is released at the request of Ranmaru, and then participates in the fight between Doubt and White Rascals. He fights a fierce battle with the Cobras, who rushes to him in a pinch.
- Kyōko Koizumi as Odake, who has a bar on Sannoh shopping street, where members of Sannoh Rengokai (Hoodlum Squad) loves to hang out. She is a close friend of Yamato's mother, Hisako Asahina. She is worried about the Sannoh Rengokai (Hoodlum Squad) 's members, who are always fighting with someone, and she also feels lonely since she hasn't seen those boys lately.
- You as Hisako Asahina, Yamato's mother. She is a gentle mother who cares for her son, who always gets hurt in fights. She was the former leader of Ichigo Milk, a legend, and the idol of girls of Ichigo Milk. With her obsession with pachinko, she is interested in a new casino.
- Yôsuke Saitô as Hajime Baba. He was in charge of a former chemical factory in the Nameless Street, and therefore he knows certain facts that the government and police have conspired to cover up. However, he makes himself disappeared to escape responsibility.
- Masayasu Yagi as Kabuto Ijuin, whose family has a barbershop on the Sannoh shopping street. Though he has always helped Sannoh Rengokai (Hoodlum Squad) in battles, he didn't officially join Sannoh Rengokai (Hoodlum Squad) until recently.
- Shogo Iwaya appears as Ken, and Shogo Yamamoto appears as Hikaru, the younger generation of Sannoh Rengokai (Hoodlum Squad). Yuya Endo portrays Koo, Yu Inaba portrays Kizzy, both of whom are founding members of White Rascals and returned to the gang to help it face the fatal war with Doubt.
- Ikki Nishimura, Tomoki Hirose, Shunsuke Nishikawa, Ryo Matsuda portrays Heidi, Marco, Lassie, Cosette, respectively, who are members of the new special fighting team SMG of White Rascals. SMG is named after Sekai Meisaku Gekijō, which Rocky watched with his mom when he was young, and he also names his new subordinates after the main characters of Sekai Meisaku Gekijō.
- Takayuki Suzuki appears as Hideto Furuya, vice-leader of Oya Koukou (Oya High School), who supports Murayama and always cheers up students of Oya Koukou (Oya High School).
- Wataru Ichinose plays Kotaro Seki, the 25-year-old formidable Oya Koukou (Oya High School) part-time school student who adores Murayama and even acts as Murayama's pet dog.
- Ken Aoki, Sho Kiyohara, and Syo Jinnai play Oya Koukou (Oya High School) part-time school students, Nakakuki, Nakabayashi, and Nakazono, respectively. Known as "San Naka"(Three Naka), they are the younger generation of Oya Koukou (Oya High School) part-time school who begin to show their power.
- Zen appears as P, a Rude Boys member, and their best Traceur.
- Gaku Sano portrays Rude Boys' new member Yu.
- Ryouhei Abe, Yuta Ozawa, Masaru Mizuno, Shunsuke Tanaka, Koji Moriya, and Yuki Izawa appear as Daruma Ikka's members Sakyo, Shu Kato, Futa, Raita, Agyo, and Ungyo, respectively.
- Shintaro Akiyama appears as Takano
- Kouhei Takeda appears as Hirai, both of whom are founding members of Doubt.
- Mandy Sekiguchi portrays Pho, a giant-like Prison Gang member who joined Mighty Warriors recently on the recommendation of Jesse.
- Alan Shirahama, Sway, Kana Oya, Likiya, Kiki Sukezane, and Japanese rapper ANARCHY play Mighty Warriors' members Bernie, Pearl, Sarah, Diddy, Dixie and 9, respectively.
- Members of Jesse's Prison Gang include Joey Iwanaga as Brown, Taro Nakatani as Mocai, Jay (Jason Remar) as Nakamon, Takeru as Miou, Yasuhiro Kido as Akune.
- The nine dragons(leaders) of the Kuryu Group are Masahiko Tsugawa as Ryushin Kuze, Koichi Iwaki as Kimitatsu Kurosaki, Goro Kishitani as Yoshitatsu Zenshin, Masaya Kato as Ryuichiro Katsunari, Takashi Sasano as Ryuhei Ueno, Masahiro Takashima as Ryukai Minamoto, Houka Kinoshita as Tatsuo Fujimori, Tatsuya Nakamura as Tatsumi Iemura, Taichi Saotome as Tatsuhito Ryu.
- Naoko Iijima plays Rikako Kuze, the beautiful wife of Kuryu Group Rikako Kuze president.
- Naoki Kobayashi appears as Genji Kuki, vice leader of Kurosakikai, who is a terrifying assassin with a Japanese sword.
- Kenchi Tachibana, Hayato Onozuka, Hideyuki Araki and Tomoya Shiroishi portray Iemurakai of Kuryu Group's executives, Nikaido, Kirinji, Fukuda, and Eto respectively.
- Kozo Takeda and Takahiro Kuroishi appear as Zenshinkai's vice president Kagetora Yoshida and executive Shinichi Udaka, respectively.
- Jutta Yuki plays Kunimitsu Oba, vice president of Katsunarikai.
- Shogen portrays Minamotokai's vice president Ken Okido.
- Kohei Watanabe appears as Ryukai's executive Yagi.
- Members of the female gang Ichigo Milk include Kaede as Shiba, Harumi Sato as Oshiage, Nonoka Yamaguchi as Nonoriki, Airi Kido as Ishikawa. Shiba does part-time jobs at "Dan Shoten", while Nonoriki is a female student in Oya Koukou (Oya High School).
- Shuuka Fujii portrays Naomi, who runs the diner "Itokan" where Sannoh Rengokai (Hoodlum Squad)'s members hang out.
- Nozomi Bando plays Nika Ijuin, sister of Kabuto Ijuin, and she does a part-time job at diner "Itokan".
- Hiroyuki Watanabe appears as Tettsu's father.
- Kousei Amano plays Ozawa, who gets hurt in the fight between Cobra and Zenshinkai.
- Keisuke Horibe portrays Eichi Hatano, Hatsunori Hasegawa portrays Shinohara, Kenichi Yajima portrays Kida, all of them are corrupted politicians who are working with the Kuryu Group to build a casino in the SWORD area.
- Kōsuke Toyohara plays as Saigo, the cop who is in charge of the SWORD area. He takes bribes from the Kuryu Group and works in their interests.
- Kohei Ikeue appears as Saigo's subordinate Kikuchi.

== Production ==
Instead of using CG, the large-scale explosion scene in the film was actually shot on the spot, using an amount of gunpowder at the very limit of what can be used in Japan.

== Release ==
High&Low The Movie 3 / Final Mission premiered in Marunouchi Piccadilly Cinema in Tokyo on October 31, 2017. Another premiere was held in United Cinema Toyosu in Tokyo on November 2, 2017, with different actors from the first premiere attending. The film was released in Japan on November 11, 2017.

On September 7, 2018, High&Low The Movie 3 / Final Mission were released in Taiwan alongside High&Low The Movie 2 / End of Sky.

== Reception ==
=== Box office ===
High&Low The Movie 3 / Final Mission was ranked No.1 at the Japanese box office on its opening, making it the second film of the series to debut at No.1 on the weekend box office charts after High&Low The Movie 2 / End of Sky. The film grossed 1.31 billion yen in total.

=== Critical response ===
Japanese rapper, writer and critic Utamaru commented that film had its shining points, writing " There are so many great scenes in High&Low The Movie 3 / Final Mission, and these scenes, which include all the details of special effects, photography, art, and costumes, are unprecedented in the history of Japanese cinema, both in terms of surrealism and quality, and in terms of ideas. When Exile Tribe makes a film, they will add a lot of "fight=dance" scenes and they will play songs of themselves at the same time, which just makes sense for films of the Exile Tribe."

He also pointed out the film was different from its prequel, High&Low The Movie 2 / End of Sky, stating that " High&Low The Movie 2 / End of Sky

was a streak of gorgeous scenes. While this time, "3" doesn't go in the direction of "2". That said, beyond the scenes, the film puts its emphasis on reclaiming the storytelling flow of all the films in the prequel series. As such, this time the story is easily accessible, making High&Low The Movie 3 / Final Mission one of the most accessible film in the High&Low series.

== Spin-offs ==
=== DTC -Yukemuri Junjou Hen- from High&Low ===
DTC -Yukemuri Junjou Hen- from High&Low is a spin-off that focus on a trip of Sannoh Rengokai (Hoodlum Squad)'s members Dan, Tettsu and Chiharu, the small sub-unit DTC. It was released on September 28, 2018 and directed by Sigeaki Kubo.

=== High&Low The Worst ===
High&Low The Worst is a spin-off that focus on Oya Koukou (Oya High School). It was released on October 4, 2019 and directed by Sigeaki Kubo.
