= High&Low The Movie 2 / End of Sky =

2017 Japanese action film

- Poster
- Directed by: Shigeaki Kubo; Tsuyoshi Nakakuki
- Screenplay by: Norihisa Hiranuma; Kei Watanabe; Shôhei Fukuda; Daisuke Kamijô; Team HI-AX
- Produced by: Hiroyuki Ueno; Naoto Fujimura; Norihisa Hiranuma; Chikako Nakabayashi
- Cinematography: Terukuni Ajisaka; Yasutaka Nagano
- Edited by: Tsuyoshi Wada
- Music by: Yuta Nakano
- Distributed by: Shochiku
- Release date: August 19, 2017
- Running time: 124 minutes
- Country: Japan
- Language: Japanese
- Box office: ¥1.34 billion

High&Low The Movie 2 / End of Sky (stylized as HiGH&LOW THE MOVIE 2 / END OF SKY) is a 2017 Japanese action film directed by Shigeaki Kubo and Tsuyoshi Nakakuki. It is the third film of the High&Low franchise, and the second film focusing on the war between yakuza organisation Kuryu Group and the SWORD gangs. Following the story of High&Low The Movie and High&Low The Red Rain, the SWORD gangs continued to fight against Kuryu Group's plan of transforming their town into a casino.

High&Low The Movie 2 / End of Sky was announced on March 18, 2017. It was also announced that the film would be released on August 19, 2017. The film's ensemble cast includes not only a large number of members of the Exile Tribe, Takanori Iwata, Akira, Sho Aoyagi, Keiji Kuroki, Takahiro, Hiroomi Tosaka and Naoto, but also actors like Kento Hayashi, Masataka Kubota, and Yuki Yamada.

The film premiered in Tokyo on August 9, 2017, with 60 cast members attending the stage greeting event. It grossed 1.34 billion yen in Japan.

== Plot ==
Though being attacked, the SWORD gangs united and defeated the army of enemies led by former Mugen Leader Kohaku at the fight at the Container street. The SWORD area gets a temporary peace.

However, Kuryu Group does not give up its plan of building a casino in the SWORD area. To fight their mutual enemies, Cobra of Sannoh Rengokai (Hoodlum Squad) suggests the five SWORD gangs should ally. However, as their leader Smoky's illness takes a turn for the worse, Rude Boys members who attend the summit of SWORD leaders in place of Smoky refuse the plan, saying that it's more important for them to survive. White Rascals' leader Rocky refuses to ally too, maintaining that they only want to protect women. The plan of alliance therefore fails.

Rocky refuses the plan for his own reason. The vicious man he has a feud with, Doubt's leader Ranmaru Hayashi has got out of prison, Rocky does not want the other SWORD gangs to get involved in the feud between them. Ranmaru Hayashi came prepared, with his money and the fierce Prison Gang he calls from the prison, he almost destroys White Rascals and injures Rocky. Cobra offers Rocky his help, but Rocky insists that one should rely on his own when he can.

Meanwhile, another fight against the casino plan has begun. After the death of their older brother Takeru, Masaki and Hiroto Amamiya gives the USB with proof of politicians taking bribes from the Kuryu Group to Kohaku, who deeply regrets the mistakes he has made and wants to expose the evil of the Kuryu Group. Kuryu Group becomes aware of their plans of publicising information in the USB, and they send Genji Kuki, vice leader of Kurosakikai, to kill the Kohaku and his right arm man Tsukumo.

To end the feud between themselves and the alliance of Doubt and the Prison Gang, the White Rascals head to the fatal battle. When they are almost killed by their powerful enemy, Cobra, and other SWORD members, come to their rescue with the determination to protect the SWORD area as a whole from their enemies. At the same time, Kohaku, Tsukumo and the Amamiya brothers have to fight the formidable killer Genji Kuki.

The biggest fight that will determine the future of the SWORD area begins. The SWORD gangs repulse the attacks of their enemies at walls, but their true enemy, the Kuryu Group, has not yet been defeated.

== Cast ==
- Takanori Iwata as Cobra, leader of Sannoh Rengokai (Hoodlum Squad), and a member of the former legendary gang Mugen. Though he always acts cool, he is a warm-hearted man deep inside. In order to protect the Sannoh shopping street he and his friend live on from those conspiring to take over the SWORD area, he proposes that the five SWORD gangs should ally. Though his plan is refused by Rocky, he tries to find out what to do next to protect the area on his own. He respects Antonio Inoki as his hero and he always wears a red scarf like Inoki.
- Nobuyuki Suzuki as Yamato, a childhood friend of Cobra and Noboru. He leads Sannoh Rengokai (Hoodlum Squad) alongside Cobra as a second man, and he also joined Mugen together with Cobra in the past. He is strong, honest and serious, and the weight of his punch and his kick is second to none. He usually works at his family shop "Asahina Maintenance", fixing motorcycles. Angry with Kuryu Group's unreasonable redevelopment plan of the SWORD area, he agrees with Cobra, who insists on thorough fighting against the yakuza group. However, he still has some confusion about whether he should refuse the plan, as he understands the feelings of Tettsu, who is inclined to accept the casino because of the circumstances of his family.
- Keita Machida as Noboru, the brain of Sannoh Rengokai (Hoodlum Squad). He has been a top student since he was in elementary school, and therefore became the star of hope for his classmates Cobra and Yamato. During college, an incident led him off the road to a good life, and he joined Kuryu Group Iemurakai as a result. Being touched by his friends, he came to his mind and left Kuryu Group Iemurakai to reunite with his friend. He was seriously injured in the revenge of Kuryu Group, but he fully recovers now. He not only works as a chief of staff but also participates in actual battles.
- Kenjiro Yamashita as Dan, the Sannoh Rengokai (Hoodlum Squad) member who talks in Kansai dialect. At present, he is the manager of "Dan Shoten" on the Sannoh shopping street, his parents' shop that sells everything. Worried about the reality of the Sannoh shopping street as a falling local shopping street, he is interested in the economic effects of the proposed casino of Kuryu Group, which creates a groove in his relation to Cobra.
- Kanta Sato as Tettsu, the special attack captain of Sannoh Rengokai (Hoodlum Squad). After he cuts his trademark dreadlocks and changes to a normal haircut, almost everyone says that they can't recognise him. His parents run a public bathhouse called "Yamanoyu". With his father's desire to continue the family business, he suffers from an inevitable dilemma of whether he should oppose the redevelopment plan of Kuryu Group after all.
- Taiki Sato as Chiharu, a member of Sannoh Rengokai (Hoodlum Squad). He joined Sannoh Rengokai (Hoodlum Squad) after they saved him from the trouble he accidentally caused on his first day at Oya Koukou (Oya High School). He has now fully absorbed the culture of Sannoh Rengokai (Hoodlum Squad), and he always hangs out with Dan and Tettsu. Therefore, he understands Dan and Tettsu's struggle and wonders whether they should fight Kuryu Group's redevelopment plan of the town after all.
- Keiji Kuroki as Rocky, leader of White Rascals. He lost his mother and sister because of the domestic violence of his father when he was young, which made him a man who could not stand any man hurting woman. Although he rarely expresses his emotions, his trust towards women is definite. He also secretly supports the band activities of AIZAWA and his friends, who have left White Rascals for their dreams. Considering his feud with DOUBT and the newly released Ranmaru Hayashi, he refuses Cobra's proposal of a SWORD gang alliance and tries to settle himself.
- Yuya Endo as Koo, White Rascals' second man. To fill the blank of White Rascals' strength after AIZAWAs and the others left, he adds special fighting team SMG to increase the fighting capacity of the gang. He is always calm and plays a polite "butler character" to Rocky, but when they enter into the war with Doubt, his high fighting spirit begins to reveals.
- Yu Inaba as Kizzy, a founding member of White Rascals. She was a scout of Doubt, but she quit the group out of disgust towards Ranmaru Hayashi and formed White Rascals with Rocky and Kaito. Though she is born as a man, she is a woman in her heart. To become the woman she is supposed to be, she quits White Rascals temporarily.
- Shuntarō Yanagi as Kaito, a founding member of White Rascals. When he was still in Doubt, he met Kizzy and fell in love with the man with a female soul, and they became partners. Since then, they have always been together. When Kizzy leaves White Rascals to live as a woman, he leaves the group together with Kizzy, and later returns to the group with Kizzy again.
- Yuki Yamada as Yoshiki Murayama, leader of Oya Koukou (Oya High School). As a student of Oya Koukou's part-time school, he survived the brutal tests of receiving 100 punches from a selection of violent people of the school and therefore became its leader according to the rules of the school. As a result, he united Oya Koukou for the first time in its history. He is small and slender, but no matter how hard he has been beaten, he has the toughness and guts to rise up again. Therefore, he used to be unable to understand other people's pain, but after a man-to-man fight with Cobra, he began to grow up and care more for people around him. In order to ally the SWORD gangs as Cobra has proposed, he goes to Daruma Ikka's power range on his own to fight Hyuga.
- Masataka Kubota as Smoky, leader of Rude Boys. He was abandoned on the Nameless Street when he was a child and grew up on that hell-like street with other abandoned kids. With the agility and jumping power he trained himself to have for survival, he can parkour so fast that no one can catch up with him. Meanwhile, he is a good leader. Though he seems cool at first sight, he considers every people living in the Nameless Street as his family, and he is loved by his members and orphans in the Nameless Street as an older brother to them. He is terminally ill for some reason related to his upbringing.
- Reo Sano as Takeshi, the second man of Rude Boys. As an orphan, he is named Takeshi after Beat Takeshi by his friends because he can fight and parkour with beats. With his flexibility and instantaneous power, he can attack others freely like he is breakdancing. He is entrusted with the job as the new leader of Rude Boys by Smoky, who is dying from his illness, and he strives to fight for the future of the family.
- Karen Fujii as Lala. She was abandoned on the Nameless Street the same day as Smoky, and has lived with Smoky as his sister since then. She worries about her brother Smoky's worsen health, while the fact that Eri, the child she cares for as her little sister, begins to cough like Smoky, adds to her worries.
- Rio Suzuki as Eri, an orphan girl living on the Nameless Street. She begins to show symptoms similar to Smoky's deadly disease, which worries Lala and others.
- Kento Hayashi as Norihisa Hyuga, leader of Daruma Ikka. He is the youngest of the four Hyuga brothers, who used to lead a gang called Hyuga Ikka under Kuryu Group, but were crushed by Mugen. He is alive to clear his stigma and forms Daruma Ikka with those who have the same grudge against Mugen. As a man who has loved fighting since he was born, he can not stand losing, and he always claims that all festivals in the SWORD area should be controlled by Daruma Ikka. He doesn't care about other gangs in the SWORD area, but he is challenged by Murayama to a man-to-man fight that aims to persuade him to agree with the alliance of SWORD gangs.
- Aoi Nakamura as Ranmaru Hayashi, leader of Doubt. Known as "Mad Dog", he is a cruel and ruthless man who has no mercy to his enemies, as well as his useless allies. Meanwhile, he believes that money can buy him everything. In the past, when he had a vicious turf war with White Rascals, he even hurt those policemen who came to stop the fight between the two gangs, and as a result, he was put into prison. After he is released from prison, he uses the money he acquires from somewhere to hire the Prison Gang he knew inside the prison to help him with the plan to take over the SWORD area.
- Elly as ICE, leader of Mighty Warriors. As a former mercenary, he boasts his overwhelming strength. He lived in a poor environment as a child, but his life changed when he encountered a discarded analog record. Since then, music and fashion become his relief. He has a dream of saving people with music, just like the way music has saved him. He is an old friend of Jesse, who taught him fashion, and he called Jesse his brother.
- Naoto as Jesse, leader of the strongest Prison Gang. Known as the " King of the Prison", he reigns in the prison tournament called "Prison Fight" with overwhelming strength, which gains him the right to move freely between "inside" and "outside." He creates a gang with people from the same Little Asia area as himself, which ensures the unity of the gang remains strong even when they go "outside" the prison. He is petite but has well-built muscles. With his incomparable speed and fighting sense, he can instantly knock out a giant. He is released at the request of Ranmaru, and he and his gang join Mighty Warriors after he meets his old friend ICE again.
- Akira as Kohaku, leader of the former legendary gang Mugen, and the man who used to control the SWORD area. He was loved by his friends and his subordinates, but the death of his friend Tatsuya made him crazy. He was stimulated by Li from Chanson to try to take over the control of the SWORD area from the SWORD gangs, but at last his friend Tsukumo, Cobra and Yamato made him come to his sense and give up the vicious plan. After that, the Amamiya Brothers entrusts him with the USB with proof of politicians taking bribes from the Kuryu Group, and he tries his best to help expose the evils of the Kuryu Group with regrets for the wrongdoing of himself. Plunging into the vortex of the fight against the Kuryu Group, he is now searching for what it means to live justly.
- Sho Aoyagi as Tsukumo, Kohaku's right arm man and the vice-leader of the former Mugen. He was seriously hurt in a car accident and had been in a hospital bed for a long period without consciousness. After he regained consciousness, he joined Kohaku in revenging the SWORD, but he struggled to think whether Kohaku is the Kohaku he used to know. Finally, together with Cobra and Yamato, he helped Kohaku to regain his sense. He is a single-minded person who doesn't like difficult theories, and his principle of action is very simple. As Kohaku has now decided to do the right thing, he is determined to support Kohaku as far as possible.
- Takahiro as Masaki Amamiya. With only his brother Hiroto, he was able to take on 100 of the most fierce Mugen fighters. He is a master of Zero Range Combat, but he never uses the skill except for fights against men with firearms, and his fighting style is centered on kicking techniques. In contrast to his brother Hiroto, who always acts cool, he is surprisingly fond of women. As soon as he sees a beautiful woman, he would act gently and tries to pick up. His habit is to say, "Listen to your old brother! " to his younger brother Hiroto. He pretends to be a frivolous two-faced person, but his soul is hot. He believes his former enemy Kohaku to be "the most trustworthy man" and entrusts him with the USB that his brother Takeru acquired at the expense of his own life.
- Hiroomi Tosaka as Hiroto Amamiya, the youngest of the Amamiya Brothers. After his mother remarried into the Amamiya family when he was young, he changed his last name to Amamiya. At first, he did not open his heart as he considered that he is the only one of the brothers who is not related to the others by blood. However, as he learned about the truth of strength from his eldest brother Takeru, and as he clashed with his second oldest brother Masaki, they eventually formed a bond thicker than blood. He has a cool personality and often coldly dismisses Masaki 's unfunny gags, but in his heart, he deeply adores his two older brothers. When his brother Takeru died, he embraced Takeru's dead body and wept aloud. Also a user of Zero Range Combat, he is as well good at boxing styles and his fighting style focuses more on punches, and like his brother Masaki, he only uses zero range combat on men with firearms.
- Naoki Kobayashi as Genji Kuki, vice leader of Kurosakikai. As he deeply adores Kurosakikai's leader Kimitatsu Kurosaki, he is the Terminator (the slaughterer) who takes pleasure in completing all kinds of order from Kimitatsu Kurosaki. With his superhuman physical abilities and inexhaustible physical strength, he attacks Kohaku, Tsukumo, and the Amamiya brothers in order to get the USB back. His weapon is a custom-made, long-bladed Japanese sword, which is so powerful that it can cut through iron. He once fought with Tatsuhito Ryu of Ryukai.
- Masayasu Yagi as Kabuto Ijuin, who knew Cobra and Yamato since he was a child, but he didn't officially join Sannoh Rengokai (Hoodlum Squad) until recently.
- Shogo Iwaya appears as Ken, and Shogo Yamamoto appears as Hikaru, the younger generation of Sannoh Rengokai (Hoodlum Squad).
- Yutaka Kyan plays Bito, Kenji Darvish plays Shimura. They left White Rascals to pursue their dream of starting a band, but when they found out that Whit Rascals are in trouble, they run to the Nameless street to ask Rude Boys for help.
- Ikki Nishimura, Tomoki Hirose, Shunsuke Nishikawa, Ryo Matsuda portrays Heidi, Marco, Lassie, Cosette, respectively, who are members of SMG, the new special fighting groups of White Rascals. SMG is named after Sekai Meisaku Gekijō, which Rocky watched with his mom when he was young, and he also names his new subordinates after the main characters of Sekai Meisaku Gekijō.
- Takayuki Suzuki appears as Hideto Furuya, vice-leader of Oya Koukou (Oya High School), who supports Murayama and always cheers up students of Oya Koukou (Oya High School).
- Wataru Ichinose plays Kotaro Seki, the 25-year-old formidable Oya Koukou (Oya High School) part-time school student who adores Murayama and even acts as Murayama's pet dog.
- Ken Aoki, Sho Kiyohara, and Syo Jinnai play Oya Koukou (Oya High School) part-time school students, Nakakuki, Nakabayashi, and Nakazono, respectively. Known as "San Naka"(Three Naka), they are the younger generation of Oya Koukou (Oya High School) part-time school who begin to show their power.
- Zen appears as P, a Rude Boys member, and their best Traceur.
- Gaku Sano portrays Rude Boys' new member Yu.
- Ryouhei Abe, Yuta Ozawa, Masaru Mizuno, Shunsuke Tanaka, Koji Moriya, and Yuki Izawa appear as Daruma Ikka's members Sakyo, Shu Kato, Futa, Raita, Agyo, and Ungyo, respectively.
- Shintaro Akiyama appears as Takano, Kouhei Takeda appears as Hirai, both of whom are founding members of Doubt.
- Alan Shirahama, Sway, Kana Oya, Likiya, Kiki Sukezane, and Japanese rapper ANARCHY play Mighty Warriors' members Bernie, Pearl, Sarah, Diddy, Dixie and 9, respectively.
- Members of Jesse's Prison Gang include Mandy Sekiguchi as Pho, Joey Iwanaga as Brown, Taro Nakatani as Mocai, Jay (Jason Remar) as Nakamon, Takeru as Miou, Yasuhiro Kido as Akune.
- The nine dragons(leaders) of the Kuryu Group are Masahiko Tsugawa as Ryushin Kuze, Koichi Iwaki as Kimitatsu Kurosaki, Goro Kishitani as Yoshitatsu Zenshin, Masaya Kato as Ryuichiro Katsunari, Takashi Sasano as Ryuhei Ueno, Masahiro Takashima as Ryukai Minamoto, Houka Kinoshita as Tatsuo Fujimori, Tatsuya Nakamura as Tatsumi Iemura, Taichi Saotome as Tatsuhito Ryu.
- Kenchi Tachibana and Hayato Onozuka portray Iemurakai of Kuryu Group's executives, Nikaido and Kirinji, respectively.
- Members of the female gang Ichigo Milk include Kaede as Shiba, Harumi Sato as Oshiage, Nonoka Yamaguchi as Nonoriki, Airi Kido as Ishikawa. Shiba does part-time jobs at "Dan Shoten", while Nonoriki is a female student in Oya Koukou (Oya High School).
- Shuuka Fujii portrays Naomi, who runs the diner "Itokan" where Sannoh Rengokai (Hoodlum Squad)'s members hang out.
- Nozomi Bando plays Nika Ijuin, sister of Kabuto Ijuin, and she does part-time jobs at diner "Itokan".
- Noémie Nakai plays Furuno, the hacker who helps to decrypt the USB with Kuryu Group's secret and is not hunt by the Kuryu Group.
- Keisuke Horibe portrays Eichi Hatano, Hatsunori Hasegawa portrays Shinohara, both of them are corrupt politicians who are working with the Kuryu Group to build a casino in the SWORD area.
- Kōsuke Toyohara plays as Saigo, the cop who is in charge of the SWORD area. He takes bribes from the Kuryu Group and works in their interests.
- Kohei Ikeue appears as Saigo's subordinate Kikuchi.

== Release ==
High&Low The Movie 2 / End of Sky premiered in Tokyo International Forum Hall A on August 9, 2017. With 60 people appearing on its stage greeting event, it was an impressive event that surpass the massive premiere of the previous High&Low The Movie. The multitude of participants included director Sigeaki Kubo and Tsuyoshi Nakakuki, producer Hiroyuki Ueno, project producer Exile Hiro, screenwriter Norihisa Hiranuma, and 56 actors who appeared in the film. The film was released in Japan on August 19, 2017.

On September 7, 2018, High&Low The Movie 2 / End of Sky were released in Taiwan alongside High&Low The Movie 3 / Final Mission.

== Reception ==
=== Box office ===
High&Low The Movie 2 / End of Sky was ranked No.1 at the Japanese box office on its opening, grossing more than 351 million yen and attracting more than 266 thousand audiences. 40% of the viewers were male, which was much higher than the 20% of the previous High&Low The Movie. The film grossed 1.34 billion yen in total and attracted audiences of more than 1 million.

=== Critical response ===
Japanese rapper, writer and critic Utamaru pointed out that "many people consider the film to be much better than its previous in the quality of its fight scenes and the plot, and since what didn't work in the previous movie have been improved, it's well-received." "They also speak highly of the film as the fight scenes and specific martial arts moves between the big gangs in the movie are very vivid." On the other hand, he also stated that "the film's naysayers don't like the film because it has too many characters, and they find it hard to make sense of the plot. In fact, the film would give you a feeling of "I don't know the plot, but the action is great."

Utamaru himself praised the film, stating that "The action, its creativity and the quality of the film are outstanding among Japanese films, and the car chases scenes and parkour battles scenes of the Rude Boys are worth watching". He also pointed out that "the relationship between the characters is also one of the film's best attractions, which adds to the charisma of its characters. He enjoyed it when the theme song of each organization is played during each battle, which reminded him of the heroes of Tokusatsu.

He also stated that the production of the whole film is quite something in Japanese film history, writing " Not only the action scenes, but the level of luxury in the subtleties of the art, sets, costumes, and novel techniques of photography is really something that can be said to be a rare quality in the history of Japanese cinema, something that can truly show the level of Japanese cinema. It is those very physically fit actors, together with perfect camera work, perfect art, and fine costumes that enable the film to achieve this kind of perfection. "

== Awards ==
- JAPAN ACTION AWARDS 2018
  - Best Action Scene
  - Best Action Director: Takahito Ouchi

== Sequels and spin-offs ==
=== High&Low The Movie 3 / Final Mission ===
High&Low The Movie 3 / Final Mission was released on November 11, 2017. It was directed by Sigeaki Kubo and Tsuyoshi Nakakuki.

=== DTC -Yukemuri Junjou Hen- from High&Low ===
DTC -Yukemuri Junjou Hen- from High&Low is a spin-off that focus on a trip of Sannoh Rengokai (Hoodlum Squad)'s members Dan, Tettsu and Chiharu, the small sub-unit DTC. It was released on September 28, 2018 and directed by Sigeaki Kubo.

=== High&Low The Worst ===
High&Low The Worst is a spin-off that focus on Oya Koukou (Oya High School). It was released on October 4, 2019 and directed by Sigeaki Kubo.
