= High&Low =

Japanese action media franchise

Film Tele
- Created by: Exile Hiro
- Original work: Puki(2015)

Print publications
- Comics: See below

Films and television
- Film: See below
- Television series: See below

Games
- Role-playing: High&Low: The Game – Another World

Audio
- Original music: Soundtracks; Live Tours
- Official website

High&Low (stylized as HiGH&LOW) is a Japanese action media franchise centred around the Exile Tribe. Produced by Exile Hiro, the High&Low entertainment project consists of television series, various films and other media, including music, stage productions, live tours, official SNS accounts, mobile games, books, manga, anime, and temporary themed establishments, comprising an all-encompassing fictional universe. In 2016, it grossed 2.7 billion yen and was the 15th-highest-grossing media franchise of Japan that year.

The High&Low franchise started in 2015 with a television drama High&Low: The Story of S.W.O.R.D., which was broadcast in October. One of its slogans was that every character in the franchise was a leading character.

== Overview ==
High&Low's story began in a town that was once under the rule of a powerful organization called "Mugen". But after a fight with the enemy they could not crush, the Amamiya Brothers, Mugen suddenly broke apart and became a legend of the past. Afterwards, five new gangs were formed and took control of the area; based on the initials of the five gangs that lead each territory, the town began to be known as the "S.W.O.R.D. Area".

=== Gangs in the world of High&Low ===
==== Mugen ====
Theme Song: Sandaime J Soul Brothers from Exile Tribe - "Mugen Road"

Founded by Kohaku, Tatsuya, and Tsukumo, and later joined by Cobra and Yamato, Mugen was the gang that used to control the area. It disbanded after a fight with the Amamiya Brothers.

==== The Amamiya Brothers ====
Theme Song: Ace of Spades feat. Hiroomi Tosaka - "Sin"

Masaki and Hiroto Amamiya are the brothers that even the powerful Mugen could not defeat. They have superior martial arts skills that can knock down hundreds of opponents. Their eldest brother, Takeru, disappeared years ago and they were looking for him.

==== Sannoh Rengokai (Hoodlum Squad) ====
Theme Song: Doberman Infinity - "Do or Die"

Sannoh Rengokai was led by former Mugen's member Cobra. They took control of the northeastern part of the S.W.O.R.D. Area and strived to protect the citizens of the "Sannoh Shopping Street".

===== DTC =====
Sannoh Rengokai's member Dan, Tettsu, Chiharu formed a small sub-unit called DTC. They often met in the Itokan Diner and joked together.

==== White Rascals ====
Theme Song: PKCZ® feat. Exile Shokichi - "Whiteout"

Getting their name from their all white attire, the White Rascals were based in a hip nightclub called "Heaven", which was run by their boss, Rocky. Following the principle of their boss, they fought to protect the women within their area.

==== Oya Koukou (Oya High School) ====
Theme Song: Doberman Infinity - "Jump Around ∞"

Oya Koukou was the high school where bad boys from all over Japan went to. As many of its graduates became yakuza, it was often considered a reserve force for various gangs.Even the "Housen Killer Corps" Who often fights with Suzuran as the strongest school in Toarushi city, admits that Oyakou is a dangerous school and even admits that Oyakou is no match for a high school student like Housen. This indirectly shows that Housen's fighting strength is below Oya Kou Part Time and is no longer a match for a high school student like Housen.

===== The Part-time School =====
The Part-Time School gang consisted of bad boys who refused to graduate and continued to fight each other, many of whom were older than 20. Their leader was Murayama.

===== The Full-time School =====
The Full-Time School was for high school students who went to school to fight. They were led by Todoroki. However, as new students like Fujio Hanaoka came to the school, the equilibrium of Oya Koukou's Full-time School collapsed into various factions that competed for hegemony.

==== Rude Boys ====
Theme Song: Generations from Exile Tribe - "Run this Town"

Led by Smoky, the Rude Boys consisted of orphans who lived together in the "Nameless Street" as a family. All skillful in the use of Parkour, they formed this army on their own to protect their home.

==== Daruma Ikka ====
Theme Song: DJ Daruma from PKCZ® - "Voice of Red feat. GS"

Daruma Ikka was led by the menacing Hyuga Norihisa, whose family's gang was defeat by Mugen. Daruma Ikka was a gang of people who hated Mugen and controlled all the rights of festivals in the area. Accompanied by his friend, the Tousetsu Brothers, Ukyo and Sakyo, they gather people who hates the Mugen gang and establish the Daruma Ikka.

==== Mighty Warriors ====
Theme Song: PKCZ(R) feat. Afrojack, CRAZYBOY, ANARCHY, SWAY, MIGHTY CROWN (MASTA SIMON & SAMI-T)- "Mighty Warriors"

The fashionable and musically inclined Mighty Warriors, led by ICE, were a bunch of fierce fighters. Based in the coastal regions near the S.W.O.R.D. Area, they would do anything to accumulate money to achieve their dream of music and fashion.

==== Kuryu Group ====
Theme Song: Exile the Second - "One Time One Life"

Literally meaning "Nine Dragons", the Kuryu Group is an organization made up of nine yakuza groups The strongest in Japan who controls the dark underbelly of Japan.

==== Ichigo Milk ====
Theme Song: E-girls - "STRAWBERRY サディスティック"

The female counterpart of Sannoh Rengokai in the Sannoh district. All dressed in pink bosozoku-style jackets, they drove around on their re-modeled bikes.

==== Chanson ====
The Korean gang who sought to control the S.W.O.R.D. Area and then expanding into the rest of Japan.

==== Doubt ====
Theme Song: Exile the Second - "ASOBO! feat. Far East Movement"

The vicious gang that kidnapped and sold women, this naturally puts them at odds with the chivalrous White Rascals.

==== Prison Gang ====
Theme Song: HONEST BOYZ - "YO!"

The general name for all gangs inside the prisons of the "Rasen Area", which is located near the S.W.O.R.D. Area, there are several gangs in those prisons. Normally, when a street gang member is thrown inside one of those prisons, he would be forced to join one of them in order to protect himself within the dangerous environment. However, Jesse, later known as the "King of the Prison", creates a new gang on his own after he is imprisoned, and very soon his gang becomes the strongest of all. Jesse's gang consists only of people from the same "Little Asia Area" as himself, which ensures their unity remains strong even when "outside" of the prison.

== Media ==
=== Television ===
| Series | Season | Episodes | Originally aired / released | | NetWork | Total Director | Notes |
|---|---|---|---|---|---|---|---|
| Series | Season | Episodes | First | Last | NetWork | Total Director | Notes |
| High&Low: The Story of S.W.O.R.D. | 1 | 10 | October 22, 2015 | December 24, 2015 | Nippon TV | Sigeaki Kubo | |
| High&Low: The Story of S.W.O.R.D. | 2 | 10 | April 17, 2016 | June 26, 2016 | Nippon TV | Sigeaki Kubo | |
| High&Low: The DTC | 1 | 11 | August 11, 2017 | August 25, 2017 | Hulu Japan | Norihisa Hiranuma | |
| The Worst Episode.O | 1 | 6 | July 18, 2019 | August 22, 2019 | Nippon TV | Sigeaki Kubo | |
| High&Low: The Best Bout | 1 | 8 | October 3, 2019 | November 21, 2019 | Nippon TV | Sigeaki Kubo | A summary of best scenes of the High&Low Series |
| 6 from High&Low: The Worst | 1 | 6 | November 19, 2020 | December 24, 2020 | Nippon TV | Sigeaki Kubo | |

=== Film ===
| Film | Japan Release Date | Director | Screenplay by | Notes |
|---|---|---|---|---|
| Road to High&Low | May 7, 2016 | Sigeaki Kubo | Team HI-AX | |
| High&Low: The Movie | July 16, 2016 | Sigeaki Kubo | Kei Watanabe, Norihisa Hiranuma, Team HI-AX | |
| High&Low: The Red Rain | October 8, 2016 | Yūdai Yamaguchi | Yûko Matsuda, Keisuke Makino, Kei Watanabe, Norihisa Hiranuma | Spin-off |
| High&Low: The Movie 2 – End of Sky | August 19, 2017 | Sigeaki Kubo, Tsuyoshi Nakakuki | Kei Watanabe, Norihisa Hiranuma, Shōhei Fukuda, Daisuke Kamijô, Team HI-AX | |
| High&Low: The Movie 3 – Final Mission | November 11, 2017 | Sigeaki Kubo, Tsuyoshi Nakakuki | Kei Watanabe, Norihisa Hiranuma, Shōhei Fukuda, Daisuke Kamijô, Team HI-AX | |
| DTC -Yukemuri Junjou Hen- from High&Low | September 28, 2018 | Sigeaki Kubo | Kei Watanabe, Norihisa Hiranuma, Shōhei Fukuda, Daisuke Kamijô | Spin-off |
| High&Low: The Worst | October 4, 2019 | Sigeaki Kubo | Hiroshi Takahashi, Kei Watanabe, Shoichiro Masumoto, Norihisa Hiranuma | Spin-off |
| High&Low: The Worst X | September 9, 2022 | Norihisa Hiranuma, Daisuke Ninomiya | Norihisa Hiranuma, Shoichiro Masumoto, Kei Watanabe | Spin-off |

=== Stage ===
| Title | Year | Director | Lead Cast | Venue |
|---|---|---|---|---|
| HiGH&LOW -The Prequel- | 2022 | Kousaku Noguchi | Suzuho Makaze, Hana Jun, Toa Serika, Minato Sakuragi, Hikaru Rukaze, Chiaki Takato | Takarazuka Grand Theater, Tokyo Takarazuka Theater |
| HiGH&LOW -The Sengoku- | 2024 | TEAM GENESIS | Ryota Katayose, Maito Minami, RIKU, Yuria Seo, Itsuki Fujiwara, Yuki Sakurai | THEATER MILANO-Za |

=== Anime ===
| Year | Title |
|---|---|
| 2017 | High&Low g-sword Animation DVD Special Edition |

=== Game ===
| Title | Genre | Japan Release Date | Publisher | Developer | Platforms | Official Website |
|---|---|---|---|---|---|---|
| High&Low: The Game – Another World | ARPG | October 28, 2019 | enish | HI-AX & enish | iOS/Android | https://high-low-thegame.com/ |

=== Manga ===
| Title | Manga Artist | Magazine | Original run | Ref. |
|---|---|---|---|---|
| High&Low: The Story of S.W.O.R.D. | Masami Hosokawa | Bessatsu Shonen Champion | 2015.vol.11-2016.vol.10. | |
| High&Low g-sword | Clamp | Weekly Shōnen Magazine | 2017.vol.16-2017.vol.36&37/2018.vol.43. | |
| DTC Original Another Story | Akira Hiramoto | Weekly Shōnen Magazine | 2018.09.26-10.03 | |

=== Book ===
| Title | Publisher | Published Date |
|---|---|---|
| High&Low: The Book | LDH | July 19, 2016 |

=== Overseas media ===
On 25 November 2025, as part of their 'Magic Vibes Maximized' event, television production company and talent agency GMMTV announced the first official overseas expansion of the High&Low franchise with their series High & Low: Born to Be High in collaboration with the production company Parbdee Taweesuk. Starring 13 of GMMTV's biggest male stars, it is slated to air in 2027. The pilot trailer is available on the GMMTV official YouTube channel.

== Music ==
=== Studio albums ===
| Title | Album details | Peak chart positions | Sales |
| Title | Album details | JPN Oricon | Sales |
|---|---|---|---|
| High&Low Original Best Album | Released: June 15, 2016; Label: Rhythm Zone; Formats: CD/DVD, CD/Blu-ray | 1 | |

=== Songs ===
| Title | Release date | Artist | Record | Notes | Ref. |
|---|---|---|---|---|---|
| Time Flies | October 12, 2016 | Ace of Spades ×PKCZ® feat. Hiroomi Tosaka | Time Flies | Theme song for High&Low The Red Rain | |
| The Red Rain | October 12, 2016 | Ace of Spades ×PKCZ® feat. Hiroomi Tosaka | Time Flies | Soundtrack for High&Low The Red Rain | |
| Break into the Dark | August 16, 2017 | Valentine feat. Rui & Afrojack | Break into the Dark(digital) | Soundtrack for High&Low The Movie 3 / Final Mission | |
| High&Low The Mighty Warriors | October 25, 2017 | Mighty Warriors | High&Low The Mighty Warriors | | |
| Yo! | November 7, 2017 | Honest Boyz | Yo!(digital) | Soundtrack for High&Low The Movie 2 / End of Sky | |
| BEPPING SOUND feat. HIROOMI TOSAKA | June 16, 2018 | Honest Boyz | BEPPING SOUND feat. HIROOMI TOSAKA(digital) | Soundtrack for DTC -Yukemuri Junjou Hen- from High&Low | |
| You & I | September 26, 2018 | Doberman Infinity | YOU & I | Theme song for DTC -Yukemuri Junjou Hen- from High&Low | |
| Futen Boyz | October 3, 2018 | Exile Shokichi | Futen Boyz | Theme song for DTC -Yukemuri Junjou Hen- from High&Low | |
| Snake Pit | September 25, 2019 | Generations from Exile Tribe | EXPerience Greatness | Soundtrack for High&Low The Worst | |
| Swag & Pride | October 2, 2019 | The Rampage from Exile Tribe | Swag & Pride | Theme song for High&Low The Worst | |
| Fired Up | October 2, 2019 | The Rampage from Exile Tribe | Swag & Pride | Soundtrack for High&Low The Worst | |
| On Fire | October 2, 2019 | Sway | On Fire(digital) | Soundtrack for High&Low The Worst | |
| Nostalgie | October 3, 2019 | Ryuto Kazuhara | Nostalgie(digital) | Soundtrack for High&Low The Worst | |
| Ain't Afraid To Die | October 4, 2019 | Exile The Second | Ain't Afraid To Die(digital) | Soundtrack for High&Low The Worst | |
| Top Down | October 4, 2019 | Exile The Second | Top Down(digital) | Soundtrack for High&Low The Worst | |
| Mada Tarinee | November 27, 2019 | Doberman Infinity | We are the one / Zutto | Soundtrack for High&Low The Worst | |
| Don't | December 4, 2019 | Salu | Gifted | Soundtrack for High&Low The Worst | |

=== Unreleased songs ===
| Title | Artist | Notes | Ref. |
|---|---|---|---|
| Welcome Back | Mighty Warriors | | |
| traffic light | DTC | Soundtrack for DTC -Yukemuri Junjou Hen- from High&Low | |
| IIKOTO | DTC with Tate fue kyōdai | Soundtrack for DTC -Yukemuri Junjou Hen- from High&Low | |
| Shura BANBAN | | Soundtrack for DTC -Yukemuri Junjou Hen- from High&Low | |

=== Video releases ===
| Title | Details | Peak chart positions | |
| Title | Details | JPNDVD | JPNBD |
|---|---|---|---|
| High&Low The Live | Released: March 15, 2017; Label: Rhythm Zone; Format: 2DVD, 2Blu-ray | 1 | 1 |

=== Tours ===
High&Low The Live (2016)

== Events ==
- HiGH&LOW THE BASE
  - 2016.07.05 - 08.31：Ultra Shiodome Paradise
- NTV×LIVE in SUMMER YOKOHAMA PKCZ×HiGH&LOW PREMIUM LIVE SHOW
  - 2016.08.05：Yokohama Red Brick Warehouse
- HiGH&LOW THE LAND / HiGH&LOW THE MUSEUM
  - 2017.06.14 - 09.10：Yomiuriland
- PKCZ®×High&Low Advance Screening Event & PREMIUM LIVE SHOW
  - 2017.11.06 - 11.07：Yokohama Arena
- PKCZ®×DTC -Yukemuri Junjou Hen- from High&Low Advance Screening Event & Premium Live Show
  - 2018.08.21：Makuhari Messe International Exhibition Hall 1–3
- High&Low THE WORST VS THE RAMPAGE from EXILE TRIBE Premiere Screening Event & Premium Live Show
  - 2019.09.17 - 09.18：Makuhari Messe
- High&Low THE WORST VS THE RAMPAGE from EXILE TRIBE On-Demand Screening & Premium Live Show
  - 2019.12.26：Yokohama Arena

== Others ==
- In June 2016, Exile Tribe's members appeared in NISSIN "CUP NOODLE" new commercial as their characters in the High&Low series.
- In October 2018, Kenjiro Yamashita, Kanta Sato, Taiki Sato, Shogo Yamamoto and Shogo Iwaya appeared in a commercial for DHC Serum as their characters (Dan, Tettsu, Chiharu, Hikaru, and Ken) in the High&Low series.

== Awards ==
- JAPAN ACTION AWARDS 2016
  - Best Action Scene: High&Low: The Story of S.W.O.R.D. Season1 Episode 6「RUDE BOYS」
  - Best Action Director: Takahito Ouchi (High&Low: The Story of S.W.O.R.D. Season 1)
  - Best Action Works:High&Low: The Story of S.W.O.R.D. Season 1
- JAPAN ACTION AWARDS 2018
  - Best Action Scene:High&Low: The Movie 2 – End of Sky
  - Best Action Director: Takahito Ouchi (High&Low: The Movie 2 – End of Sky)
