= High&Low The Movie =

- Poster
- Directed by: Shigeaki Kubo
- Screenplay by: Kei Watanabe; Norihisa Hiranuma; Team HI-AX
- Produced by: Hiroyuki Ueno; Naoto Fujimura; Norihisa Hiranuma; Chikako Nakabayashi
- Cinematography: Terukuni Ajisaka
- Music by: Yuta Nakano; Agung Gede
- Distributed by: Shochiku
- Release date: July 16, 2016
- Running time: 129 minutes
- Countries: Japanese; English; Korean
- Language: Japanese
- Box office: ¥2.1 billion

High&Low The Movie (stylized as HiGH＆LOW THE MOVIE) is a 2016 Japanese action film directed by Shigeaki Kubo. The film's ensemble cast includes a large number of members of the Exile Tribe, Takanori Iwata, Akira, Sho Aoyagi, Takahiro and Hiroomi Tosaka for instances, but also actors like Kento Hayashi, Masataka Kubota, and Yuki Yamada. It is the first original film of the High&Low franchise, which follows the story of television series High&Low: The Story of S.W.O.R.D. The film continues to tell the stories of the five gangs that control the SWORD area. It was announced on 11 August 2015 as the centre of the High&Low entertainment project when the project was announced.

High&Low The Movie premiered in Tokyo on 4 July 2016 with more than 50 people appeared on its stage greeting event in Tokyo International Forum and was released in Japan by Shochiku on 16 July 2016. The film was released in South Korea on 12 January 2017 and in Taiwan on 20 January 2017. To celebrate the release of the film, 36 actors and singers, who took part in the High&Low project, participated in a series of stage greetings events held in 143 cinemas in all 47 prefectures of Japan in 3 days. It grossed ¥2.1 billion and attracted 1.6 million audiences.

== Plot ==
A town which was once dominated by Mugen has been split into 5 districts dominated by five gangs named Sannoh Rengokai, White Rascals, Oya Koukou, Rude Boys and Daruma Ikka. The town is also known as the S.W.O.R.D. area. Mugen's grip on the town ended after the legendary Amamiya brothers refused to submit to their will.

The 5 gangs that comprise S.W.O.R.D. fight for their pride and glory, but the mysterious new gang called Mighty Warriors who newly comes to the coastal regions near the S.W.O.R.D. area begins to challenge their reigns. Kohaku, who is the former leader of the powerful Mugen, is devastated over the death of his close friend Tatsuya. Kohaku is approached by Lee from Chanson, a mafia from South Korea. Chanson is working with the local yakuza group called Kuryu Group to gain control of the area together and Lee induces Kohaku to join the plan.

To achieve this goal, Chanson and Kuryu Group also enlist the help of the vicious gang D.O.U.B.T. and Mighty Warriors to cause havoc in all five districts of the S.W.O.R.D. area. Mighty Warriors sets the Nameless Road ablaze, killing some of the residents there. The S.W.O.R.D. gang joins to defeat Kohaku and his five hundred men to protect their town. The Amamiya Brothers also join the 5 SWORD gangs in the fatal fight. In the fight, Kohaku realizes his mistake and the S.W.O.R.D gang thwarts Lee's plan, thus winning the fatal fight.

== Cast ==
- Takanori Iwata as Cobra, leader of Sannoh Rengokai (Hoodlum Squad), and a member of the former legendary gang Mugen. His full name is Hino Junpei, and as his family runs the gas station Hino Oil on Sannoh shopping street, he grew up there with Noboru and Yamato. He is a man of few words, but he cares for his friends. He is called 'Cobra' because he defeated 10 opponents with cobra clutch in a childhood fight.
- Nobuyuki Suzuki as Yamato, a childhood friend of Cobra and Noboru. He leads Sannoh Rengokai (Hoodlum Squad) alongside Cobra as a second man, and he also joined Mugen together with Cobra in the past. He is strong, honest and serious, and the weight of his punch is second to none. He loves motorcycles and he usually works at his family shop "Asahina Maintenance", fixing motorcycles.
- Keita Machida as Noboru, a childhood friend of Cobra and Yamato. He was smart as a kid and left the town when he entered college. However, his life changed after his girlfriend Miho was raped. He went on a road of revenge and joined Kuryu Group Iemurakai, helping the group to seek control over the SWORD area.
- Kenjiro Yamashita as Dan, a member of Sannoh Rengokai (Hoodlum Squad) and the "D" of the small sub-unit DTC. Talking in Kansai dialect, he is a mood maker of the group. At present, he is the manager of "Dan Shoten", his parents' shop that sells everything.
- Kanta Sato as Tettsu, a member of Sannoh Rengokai (Hoodlum Squad) and the "T" of the small sub-unit DTC. He joins the group since he is a big fan of Cobra and Yamato, and he becomes a special attack captain of the group. He can be easily recognised with his dreadlocks and his baby face. In fights, he would rush into the enemies ferociously. His parents run a public bathhouse called "Yamanoyu".
- Taiki Sato as Chiharu, a member of Sannoh Rengokai (Hoodlum Squad) and the "C" of the small sub-unit DTC. Originally, he transferred to Oya Koukou (Oya High School) without too much knowledge of the rules in the school, and therefore he ran into trouble on his first day. He was rescued by Yamato, which led to a fight between Sannoh Rengokai (Hoodlum Squad) and Oya Koukou (Oya High School).
- Akira as Kohaku, leader of the former legendary gang Mugen, and the man who used to control the SWORD area. He disbanded Mugen after the death of his friend Tatsuya and disappeared. But after Li from Chanson locates him, he begins to shows another side of himself.
- Sho Aoyagi as Tsukumo, Kohaku's right arm man and the vice-leader of the former Mugen. He had an emptiness in his heart and lived an ephemeral life until he met Kohaku. He was seriously hurt in a car accident and had been in a hospital bed for a long period without consciousness. But now, he regains consciousness and continues to support his friend Kohaku.
- Arata Iura as Tatsuya, one of Kohaku's best friends since childhood. He founded Mugen with Kohaku because both of them they liked motorcycles, and then he retired to open a diner called "Itokan" on Sannoh shopping street. This was a dream he had always had, but he died soon after the realisation of his dream.
- Shuuka Fujii as Naomi, Tatsuya's sister. After the death of her brother, she continues to run the diner "Itokan", which become the hang-out for Sannoh Rengokai (Hoodlum Squad). She is also a childhood friend of Yamato, and she cares for members of Sannoh Rengokai (Hoodlum Squad), who often get injured in fights. She has a bitter tongue towards those boys, but she always treats their wounds gently.
- Takahiro as Masaki Amamiya. He has superior martial arts skills that can knock down hundreds of opponents. Together with his younger brother, Hiroto, the two men used to fight Mugen, which consisted of more than 100 people. They are the only men who could equal Kohaku in fightings. Meanwhile, he likes women so much that he is always trying to pick up at clubs.
- Hiroomi Tosaka as Hiroto Amamiya. He is a trouble maker who loves fighting from the bottom of his heart. Like his older brother, he has superior martial arts skills and used to fight with the powerful Mugen. He usually acts cool, but once he gets sick, he would become so cute that even his brother Masaki could not handle. In contrast with his brother, he is very good at different boxing styles.
- Keiji Kuroki as Rocky, leader of White Rascals. He is a spooky man with blonde hair, circular sunglasses, and teeth decorated with Silver Grillz. He would attack any man without mercy if those men hurt any woman, and would continue to monitor those men after that. His weapon is a walking stick with silver decoration.
- Yuya Endo as Koo, a White Rascals member who serves White Rascals leader Rocky like his butler. He always wears a thin smile on his face, and he rarely loses his politeness in his tone.
- Shuntarō Yanagi as Kaito, a member of White Rascals. Like his fellow partner Kizzy, he was a former member of White Rascals' long-time enemy Doubt. They left Doubt after they met with Rocky, and has become Rocky's followers ever since. He is a silent man, but in fights, he would scare his opponents with his intimidating eyes.
- Yu Inaba as Kizzy, a member of White Rascals. She was impressed by Rocky's care for women when he confronted Rocky in a fight as a member of White Rascals long-time enemy Doubt, and therefore quit Doubt to become a supporter of Rocky. She always works with her partner Kaito, who quit Doubt with her.
- Yuki Yamada as Yoshiki Murayama, leader of Oya Koukou (Oya High School). As a student of Oya Koukou's part-time school, he survived the brutal tests of receiving 100 punches from a selection of violent people of the school and therefore became its leader according to the rules of the school. As a result, he united Oya Koukou for the first time in its history. He is small and slender, but no matter how hard he has been beaten, he has the toughness and guts to rise up again.
- Gōki Maeda as Yosuke Todoroki, leader of Oya Koukou (Oya High School)'s full-time school. Though he was new to Oya Koukou, with his militant personality, he achieved the unification of Oya Koukou (Oya High School)'s full-time school almost as soon as he entered the school. Though he almost equals Murayama in fights, he lost to Murayama in a fight for the leader of the whole Oya Koukou. Since then, he has been searching for the truth of strength.
- Masataka Kubota as Smoky, leader of Rude Boys. He considers every people living in the Nameless Street as his family, and he would crushed anyone who threatens the safety of those people. Though he is strong as a leader, he is in fact terminally ill.
- Reo Sano as Takeshi, a member of Rude Boys who can attack like he is breakdancing. As an orphan, he is named Takeshi after Beat Takeshi by his friends because he can fight and parkour with beats. Like Shion, he cares deeply for Smoky, who took care of him like his brother from he was little.
- Tasuku Nagase as Shion, a member of Rude Boys. Though he is concerned about Smoky's disease, he breaks the rules of the group and collaborates with the Iemurakai to secretly make dangerous drugs "Redrum" at an abandoned factory in the Nameless Street. When his secret is exposed, he leaves the Nameless Street.
- Karen Fujii as Lala. She was abandoned on the Nameless Street the same day as Smoky, and has lived with Smoky as his sister since then. She has a gentle personality and cares for the old people and children in the Nameless Street.
- Kento Hayashi as Norihisa Hyuga, leader of Daruma Ikka. He is the youngest of the four Hyuga brothers, who used to lead a gang called Hyuga Ikka under Kuryu Group, but were crushed by Mugen. He is alive to clear his stigma and forms Daruma Ikka with those who have the same grudge against Mugen, but he becomes not so sure about his revenge after his fight with Sannoh Rengokai (Hoodlum Squad).
- Kenchi Tachibana as Nikaido, an executive of Iemurakai of Kuryu Group. He met Noboru in prison and invited Noboru to join the dark side by saying: "If you're ready to burn the past, I'll show you the last path." He is a man with a strong ambition to rise to higher position in the gang, and he would use any means to achieve his goals.
- Tatsuya Nakamura as Tatsumi Iemura, leader of Iemurakai of Kuryu Group, and one of Kuryu Group's nine dragons. He longs to become the leader of Kuryu Group. Despite his gentle tone, he has no tolerance for betraying and failing.
- V.I as Lee, son of Chanson's boss Chang. He investigates Kohaku's past thoroughly and presents Kohaku with certain information to incite Kohaku to invade SWORD. He considers making things to go as the ways he wants to be the most enjoyable thing in the world.
- Elly as ICE, leader of Mighty Warriors. As a former mercenary, he boasts his overwhelming strength. He lived in a poor environment as a child, but his life changed when he encountered a discarded analog record. Since then, music and fashion becomes his relief. He has a dream of saving people with music, just like the way music has saved him.
- Alan Shirahama as Bernie, a member of Mighty Warriors and a hacker. He likes to make fun of people and often works as a DJ.
- Sway as Pearl, a member of Mighty Warriors. He has a cheerful personality and is the mood maker of the group.
- Kana Oya as Sarah, the only female member of Mighty Warriors. She was kidnapped by Doubt, but was saved by Mighty Warriors. She was unable to believe in the group's philosophy at first, but was attracted to ICE's straightforward mind and became a member. She goes around on a motorcycle.
- Shintaro Akiyama as Takano, a member of Doubt. He makes money by kidnapping and procurement, and is related with Iemurakai. He is hired by Lee to attack SWORD under Kohaku's command.
- Fujiko Kojima as Junko, leader of female gang Ichigo Milk. She pretends to be tough in front of her juniors, but deep inside, she is woman who is easy to fall in love. She likes Cobra, but she would become so shy when she meets him that she would lose control of her temper.
- Kyōko Koizumi as Odake, who has a bar on Sannoh shopping street. She is a close friend of Yamato's mother, Hisako Asahina, and she often serves as a life counsellor for the members of Sannoh Rengokai (Hoodlum Squad) and gives them accurate advice.
- You as Hisako Asahina, Yamato's mother. Though she is obsessed with pachinko, she is a gentle mother who cares for her son. She is good at making onigiri. She was the former leader of Ichigo Milk, a legend, and the idol of girls of Ichigo Milk.
- Kōsuke Toyohara as Saigo, the cop who is in charge of the SWORD area. He takes bribes from Iemurakai and lets them do whatever they want in the area.

Hiroyuki Takaya portrays Ohta, and Yushin Okami portrays Konishi, both former members of Mugen and now boxers working overseas. Shogo Iwaya appears as Ken, and Shogo Yamamoto appears as Hikaru. Both of them joined Sannoh Rengokai (Hoodlum Squad) under the recommendation of Tettsu. Shō Kiryūin plays Aizawa, Yutaka Kyan plays Bito, Jun Utahiroba plays Enari, Kenji Darvish plays Shimura. As members of the White Rascals, the four of them always work together. Takayuki Suzuki appears as Hideto Furuya, vice-leader of Oya Koukou (Oya High School), who have a strong belief in Murayama. Wataru Ichinose plays Kotaro Seki, the 25-year-old Oya Koukou (Oya High School) part-time school student who puts himself under the command Murayama. Ryu and Takahide Suzuki play Oya Koukou (Oya High School) full-time school students, Sibaman and Tsuji, respectively. Zen appears as P, a Rude Boys member and their best Traceur. Kaname Endo, Ryouhei Abe, Yuta Ozawa appear as Daruma Ikka's members, Ukyo, Sakyo, Shu Kato, respectively. Tokuma Nishioka, Kazuyuki Matsuzawa, Hayato Onozuka portray Iemurakai of Kuryu Group's executives, Ishii, Kawada, and Kirinji, respectively. Hakuryu appears as Chanson's boss Chang. Taichi Saotome and Japanese rapper ANARCHY play Mighty Warriors's members Ryu and 9, respectively. Kouhei Takeda appears as Hirai, a member of Doubt. Members of the female gang Ichigo Milk include Ayano Kudo as Asuka, Kaede as Shiba, Harumi Sato as Oshiage, Nonoka Yamaguchi as Nonoriki, Airi Kido as Ishikawa. Shiba is Sibaman's older sister and does part-time job at "Dan Shoten", while Nonoriki is a female student in Oya Koukou (Oya High School). Other people living on Sannoh shopping street include Masayasu Yagi as Kabuto Ijuin, Ayumu Kato as Kakuto Ijuin, Nozomi Bando as Nika Ijuin, Kousei Amano as Ozawa. The Ijuin brothers have a barbershop, and their sister Nika does part-time job at diner "Itokan". Kaoru Hirata portrays Noburu's former girlfriend Miho.

== Release ==
High&Low The Movie premiered in Tokyo in Tokyo International Forum Hall A on July 4, 2016. With more than 50 people appeared on its stage greeting event, it is a "massive" premiere that has never been seen in Japan. The massive group of participants included director Sigeaki Kubo, producer Hiroyuki Ueno, project producer Exile Hiro, screenwriter Norihisa Hiranuma, and 46 actors who appeared in the film. The film was released in Japan on July 16, 2016. To celebrated the release of the film, 36 actors, and singers who took part in the High&Low project participated in a series of stage greetings events held in 143 cinemas in 3 days, covering all 47 prefectures of Japan.

On January 12, 2017, High&Low The Movie was released in South Korea.

On September 29, the international premiere of the High&Low series was held in Taipei at Lux Cinema. Takahiro and Hiroomi Tosaka attended the event and greeted their Chinese fans with Chinese. On January 20, 2017, High&Low The Movie and its spin-off High&Low The Red Rain were released in Taiwan simultaneously.

== Reception ==
=== Box office ===
High&Low The Movie was second placed at the Japanese box office on its opening, grossing ¥668.3 million. 80% of its first weekend audiences are female. On its second weekend, it was fifth placed, and reached a total gross of over ¥1 billion. The film grossed 2.1 billion yen in total and attracted 1.6 million audiences.

=== Critical response ===
Reiichi Narima described the film as chaos with too many characters on screens, and audiences would "find it hard to focus on any of them" without an obvious main character. Meanwhile, Narima stated that "the fact that it has no deciding main character may just be the essence of the Exile Tribe and is in tune with the times". He also pointed out that "the story of Kohaku might resonate with male audiences." Yousuke Fujimoto considered the film to be special, writing that "all characters are produced based on the personality of the actor himself, which achieved a sense of harmony. " Moreover, Yosuke pointed out the related music of the High&Low franchise was also very important. He wrote, "After watching the movie, if you hear the theme songs of any gang, the scenes of films will immediately come to your mind."

== Sequels and spin-offs ==
=== High&Low The Red Rain ===
High&Low The Red Rain is a spin-off that focus on the story of the Amamiya Brothers. It was released on October 8, 2016, and directed by Yūdai Yamaguchi.

=== High&Low The Movie 2 / End of Sky ===
High&Low The Movie 2 / End of Sky was released on August 19, 2017. It was directed by Sigeaki Kubo and Tsuyoshi Nakakuki.

=== High&Low The Movie 3 / Final Mission ===
High&Low The Movie 3 / Final Mission was released on November 11, 2017. It was directed by Sigeaki Kubo and Tsuyoshi Nakakuki.

=== DTC -Yukemuri Junjou Hen- from High&Low ===
DTC -Yukemuri Junjou Hen- from High&Low is a spin-off that focus on a trip of Sannoh Rengokai (Hoodlum Squad)'s members Dan, Tettsu and Chiharu, the small sub-unit DTC. It was released on September 28, 2018, and directed by Sigeaki Kubo.

=== High&Low The Worst ===
High&Low The Worst is a spin-off that focus on Oya Koukou (Oya High School). It was released on October 4, 2019, and directed by Sigeaki Kubo.
