= Kenjiro Yamashita =

Japanese dancer, actor and radio personality

Kenjiro Yamashita 山下 健二郎
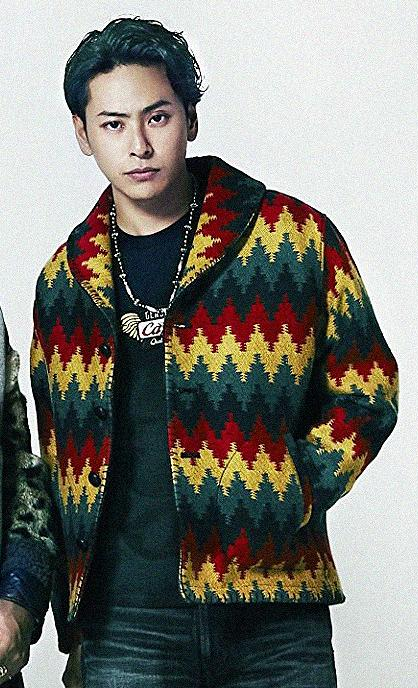
- Yamashita in 2015

Background information
- Born: 24 May 1985 (age 41); Kyoto Prefecture, Japan
- Genres: J-pop
- Occupations: Dancer; actor; radio personality
- Years active: 2010–present
- Label: Rhythm Zone
- Member of: Sandaime J Soul Brothers
- Formerly of: Exile Tribe
- Spouse: Aya Asahina (m. 2021)
- Website: Official website

Kenjiro Yamashita (山下 健二郎, Yamashita Kenjirō; born 24 May 1985 in Kyoto Prefecture, Japan) is a Japanese dancer, actor and radio personality. He is a performer of J-pop dance and vocal group Sandaime J Soul Brothers and a former member of Gekidan Exile. As a member of Sandaime J Soul Brothers, he has received the Japan Record Awards twice. He has appeared in a few TV dramas and films, and he held starring roles in the film Pan to Bus to Nidome no Hatsukoi (Our Blue Moment) and dramas Fukuyadou Honpo – Kyoto Love Story -, Love or Not, Manga Mitai ni Ikanai, Game Mitai ni Ikanai. He is also the Tuesday host for NTV's morning information program ZIP! He was the Friday host for the famous Japanese radio program All Night Nippon before he moved to his new radio program Sandaime J Soul Brothers Yamashita Kenjiro's Zero Base in 2019.

Yamashita is known for having various hobbies. One of his enthusiasms is fishing, for which he has won awards like the Cool Anglers Award 2019. He also became a YouTuber in 2019 to share his hobbies (mainly fishing) with the world.

== Biography ==
=== Early life ===
Kenjiro Yamashita was born on 24 May 1985, in Kyoto Prefecture. His family moved to Nara Prefecture when he was still in pre-school for his father's job, but they moved back to Kyoto Prefecture in his second grade. At Nagaokakyo Municipal Nagaoka Daishi Junior High School, he began to play basketball after joining the basketball club with his friends, and he became so obsessed with basketball that he chose to enrol in Kyoto Prefectural Koyo High School because it had one of the basketball teams in Kyoto Prefecture. He was the captain of the school basketball team in his final year.

With an ambition to win the favour of girls, Yamashita began dancing in his second year of high school. His friend taught him breaking, and they performed at the cultural festival of his high school that year. Being so fond of dancing, he quit university ten days after his enrolment and then spent his time practicing dancing and doing part-time jobs. He also switched from breaking to Hip-Hop because with the limit of his height(187 cm), it would be harder for him to perform classic breaking dance moves like the windmill. Seeing his love for dancing, his mother suggested him to go to a proper dancing school to make a living out of it. As a result, he enrolled in the street dancing department at Cat Music College in Osaka. Upon graduation, Yamashita was offered the job of a parade dancer at Universal Studio Japan. He worked there for two years and participated in many shows and parades.

In 2007, Yamashita got an opportunity to serve as a backup dancer in Exile's tour Exile Live Tour 2007 'Exile Evolution'. He was shocked and impressed after seeing the performance of Exile up close, and the seed of dreaming to become an artist just like Exile took root in his heart. He enrolled in EXPG Osaka (a talent school run by Exile's management company LDH) as soon as it opened and he became an instructor there later. His students included Yuta Nakatsuka, Mio Nakajima, Shūka Fujii, Karen Fujii, Zin, Shogo Iwaya, Masahiro Sunada and Rikiya Okuda. Then he quit his steady job at Universal Studios Japan to focus on his dream, much to the surprise of the management team of Universal. His resignation was accepted after he showed his determination to try his best to pursue his dream, and he got blessings from his former bosses and colleagues. During his time at EXPG Osaka, he did more backup dancers jobs for Exile and other LDH's artists. He met Naoto and Naoki, his future Sandaime J Soul Brothers' groupmate and Nidaime J Soul Brothers' members at that time, when he served as a backup dancer for Nidaime J Soul Brothers' shows in Osaka. In 2009, he took part in the audition for Gekidan Exile, the actor group produced by LDH. He was one of the finalists, and despite not getting chosen as a formal member, he was invited to take lessons in Tokyo together with the winners as a backup candidate. Taking this opportunity, he moved to Tokyo from Osaka.

=== Career ===
After a year of lessons in the days and part-time jobs at nights in Tokyo, Yamashita was chosen to debut as an actor and a member of the actor group Gekidan Exile Kazegumi (the team of wind) in April 2010. He performed in Gekidan Exile's play NIGHT BALLET and was in charge of the choreography for the final all-in dance scene. In May 2010, he performed in Gekidan Exile's 4th play DANCE EARTH ~Negai~.

In September 2010, Yamashita passed the audition for performers of the new Sandaime J Soul Brothers. The life changing announcement for Yamashita was announced at the rehearsal for Exile's Exile Live Tour 2010 'Fantasy' in Noevir Stadium Kobe by Hiro, producer of Sandaime J Soul Brothers, and he was thrilled to finally saw his dream coming true. In fact, he had considered giving up his dream and going back to Kyoto to become a dance instructor or a professional angler if he failed this audition. On 27 September, He appeared and performed for the first time as a member of Sandaime J Soul Brothers on the stage of Exile's Live FANTASY After Night Festival ～EXILE Soul～. On 10 November, he debuted in Sandaime J Soul Brothers with the single, "Best Friend's Girl". In December, he performed in Gekidan Exile's play Rokudenashi Blues playing Hamada, a strong fighter of the boxing club. In July 2011, He officially withdrew from Gekidan Exile. In August, he reprised his role as Hamada in TV drama Rokudenashi BLUES as a guest star.

In July 2013, Yamashita appeared in TV drama Frenemy~Rumble of the Rat~, playing journalist Kenichi Jogasaki. He appeared in two plays in this year, Attack No.1 from August to September and Monsieur! from October to November.

After Sandaime J Soul Brothers' major hit "R.Y.U.S.E.I." in 2014, Yamashita gained more opportunities on mainstream media. He became the Friday host for the famous Japanese radio program All Night Nippon in April 2015. He appeared in NHK BS Premium's drama Aru Hi, Ahiru Bus as Kosuke Namiki, the former boyfriend of the main character Hazuki (starring Norika Fujiwara) in July and August 2015. He also appeared in the TBS's TV drama Napoleon no Mura ("Save Our Town! ") as homestayer Naoto Misaki. On 21 October, the first season of the drama High&Low was broadcast, which was the start of the High&Low franchise, the action and music franchise produced by the Exile Tribe. Yamashita played Dan, a member of Sanno Hoodlum Squad, which was one of the gangs that controlled the S.W.O.R.D. area in the world of the High&Low franchise.

In 2016, Yamashita reprised his role as Dan in the TV drama High&Low Season 2 and film High&Low The Movie and High&Low The Red Rain. In January, he served as the main host for the special show Nippon Broadcasting System LIVE EXPO TOKYO 2016 ALL LIVE NIPPON Vol.4. In October 2016, he starred in Amazon Prime Video Drama Fukuyadou Honpo – KYOTO LOVE STORY - as Kaoru Hiyama, the fiancé of Nozomi Sasaki's character Hina Fukuyoshi. Hiyama, a handsome banker and the heir to the Hiyama family estate, fell in love with Hina at first sight and proposed to her, and the couple decided to get married even they have just met and have never gone on a date.

In 2017, Yamashita got his first lead role in the dTV×FOD's drama Love or Not. As office worker Kosuke Usami, he had an unexpected love story with Yuika Motokariya's character Mako. In February, he served as the main host for the special show Nippon Broadcasting System All Night Nippon 50th Anniversary ALL LIVE NIPPON Vol.5. In April, he appeared in the play Manga Mitai ni Ikanai alongside comedy group Tokyo 03 and Maika Yamamoto, playing Hirohiko Aramaki, the assistant to the unpopular mangaka Osamu Totsuka. A sitcom version of the play was released on Hulu Japan in October and then broadcast on NTV in January 2018. Besides, he also reprised his role as Dan in the film High&Low The Movie 2 / End of Sky released in August 2017 and High&Low The Movie 3 / Final Mission released in November 2017. What's more, a spin-off comedy series led by Yamashita as Dan, High&Low: The DTC, was released on Hulu in August. The series showed the casual life of High&Low's character Dan, Tettsu (starring Kanta Satô), Chiharu (starring Taiki Satô) from Sannoh Hoodlum Squad, who call themselves DTC.

In 2018, Yamashita appeared opposite Mai Fukagawa in the romance film the film Pan to Bus to Nidome no Hatsukoi ("Our Blue Moment"). He played Tamotsu Yuasa, a bus driver and the love interest of the heroine played by Mai Fukagawa. The film premiered at the 30th Tokyo International Film Festival in October 2017 and was released on 17 February 2018. From April, he serves as the Tuesday host for NTV's morning information program "ZIP!" On 22 June, the anthology film Uta Monogatari: Cinema Fighters Project, the second film of the Cinema Fighters project (Cinema Fighters is a joint project by Exile Hiro, Tetsuya Bessho, who is the representative director of SSFF & ASIA, and lyricist Masato Odake.), was released. Yamashita starred as a fisherman in one of the six stories of the anthology, Genkou no Hate, which was directed and written by Tsukasa Kishimoto. From 5 to 19 August, he led in play Hachioji Zombies, playing a temporary monk who teach Zombies to dance. He also reprised his role as Dan in the film DTC -Yukemuri Junjou Hen- from High&Low, alongside Kanta Satô and Taiki Satô, as DTC went on a vacation in an onsen (hot springs). The film was released limitedly on 28 September in Japan. Then in October, he successfully held the special show J SOUL BROTHERS III Yamashita Kenjiro no ALL NIGHT NIPPON presents Yama Fes. ~Yamashita Base in YOKOHAMA ARENA~, which attracted 10 thousand audiences.

In 2019, Yamashita appeared in play Manga Mitai ni Ikanai. Dai 2 Kan the sequel to 2017's Manga Mitai ni Ikanai, as well as its sitcom version "Game Mitai ni Ikanai". In March, he announced that he would leave the radio program All Night Nippon at the end of the month, and started his personal radio program, Sandaime J Soul Brothers Yamashita Kenjiro's Zero Base, which would be broadcast at 24:00 pm every Friday. In August, Universal Studios Japan appointed Sandaime J Soul Brothers' Kenjiro Yamashita and Naoto as its ambassadors for its Halloween event of 2019, Universal Surprise Halloween, and announced that the theme of 2019's Halloween event would be Zombie de Dance, and Sandaime J Soul Brothers' new song "Rat-tat-tat" as well as its choreography were used as the theme for the event. On 5 December, he made the draw for the men's and women's quarter-finals in the draw for the final round of the 95th Emperor's and 86th Empress's Cup All Japan Basketball Championship Tournament.

In January 2020, he again successfully held his special show, J SOUL BROTHERS III Yamashita Kenjiro no Zero Base presents Yama Fes. ~Yamashita Base in YOKOHAMA ARENA 2020 ~. On 17 July, the movie version of Hachioji Zombies was released, in which Yamashita reprised his role of monk Takashi Habuki. This is the first time he led in a film. He also released fishing lure he produced in collaboration with fishing tackle brand EVERGREEN in October. On 22 December, it was announced that he was chosen as the winner for Cool Anglers Award 2021 by Japan fishing show again, which made him the first person to win the award three times in a row and the first person to enter the hall of fame for the award.

== Business ==
On 7 January 2021, Yamashita announced that he launched his own apparel brand "HIGH FIVE FACTORY Produce By KENJIRO YAMASHITA". It is a brand that offers fashionable and functional clothing for people who enjoy DIY, fishing and camping.

== Personal life ==
=== Family ===
Yamashita is a descendant of famous Japanese ceramist Kiyomizu Rokubei IV. He has an older brother.

On 26 July 2021, it was announced that Yamashita had married actress Aya Asahina.

In December 2023, Asahina revealed that she was expecting the couple's first child. The couple jointly announced through their official social media accounts that they had welcomed the birth of their first child, a son, on March 25, 2024.

=== Hobbies ===
Yamashita is known for having various hobbies, and he has said that he wants to be a second George Tokoro, who is also known for having a diversity of hobbies.

==== Fishing ====
One of Yamashita's biggest enthusiasms is fishing, especially Bass fishing. He started Bass Fishing when he was in elementary school under the influence of manga Grander Musashi, and his love for fishing grew deeper as he grew up. He had even considered becoming a professional angler. In 2019, he got a boating license so that he could drive his own boat when fishing.

He promoted fishing in both his radio programs, Sandaime J Soul Brothers Yamashita Kenjiro's All Night Nippon and Sandaime J Soul Brothers Yamashita Kenjiro's Zero Base, apart from his SNS account. He won the "Cool Anglers Award 2019" and "Cool Anglers Award 2020" for his passionate promotion of fishing to the public. He is the first person to win this award in two continuous years.

He became a YouTuber in 2019 to share his hobbies (mainly fishing) with the world.

==== Karate ====
Yamashita learned karate when he was young, and he holds a black belt. He won the Kyoto karate tournament in his junior 1.

==== Beatboxing ====
Yamashita learned to beatbox when he was working in Universal Studio Japan to perform beatboxing in a show there. He often performs beatboxing to accompany the groupmate's Elly's dancing and rap.

==== DIY ====
Yamashita is a DIY lover. Apart from designing and making many small things, he also rebuilt his own home. In 2018, he published a book, Sandaime J Soul Brothers Kenjiro Yamashita Workers Tool Book, about DIY projects. In 2019, he won the DIY Award at Japan DIY Homecenter Show 2019 For his contribution and inspiration to the world of DIY.

==== Sneakers ====
Yamashita is a sneaker-head who collects and admires sneakers as a hobby. His love for sneakers took root in his years in the basketball clubs at high school and was influenced by his street dance teacher Hiro. He now had more than 150 pairs of sneakers and a warehouse to stock them.

== Filmography ==
=== TV series ===
Year	Title	Role	Network	Notes	Ref.
2011	Rokudenashi Blues	Hamada	NTV	Episode 7	
2013	Frenemy~Rumble of the Rat~	Kenichi Jogasaki	NTV		
2014	Gokuaku Ganbo	Masao Onigiri	Fuji TV	Episode 5	
2015	Aru Ni Tsu, Ahirubasu	Kosuke Namiki	NHK BS Premium		
2015	Napoleon no Mura	Naoto Misaki	TBS		
2015	High&Low: The Story of S.W.O.R.D.	Dan	NTV		
2016	Night Hero Naoto	Himself	TV Tokyo	Episode 1,4,8; ending dance	
2018	Manga Mitai ni Ikanai.	Hirohiko Aramaki	NTV		
2018	Gakeppuchi Hoteru (Hotel on the Brink)	Shotaro Kasaya	NTV	Episode 10 &sp	
2019	High&Low The Worst Episode.O	Dan	NTV	Episode 3	
2019	Game Mitai ni Ikanai.	Hirohiko Aramaki	NTV		
2020	Hachioji Zombies	Takashi Habuki	MX		

=== Internet dramas ===
Year	Title	Role	Website	Ref.
2016	Fukuyadou Honpo – KYOTO LOVE STORY -	Kaoru Hiyama	Amazon Prime Video	
2017	High&Low: The DTC	Dan	Hulu Japan	
2017	Love or Not	Kosuke Usami	dTV・FOD	
2018	Love or Not 2	Kosuke Usami	dTV・FOD	

=== Film ===
Year	Title	Role	Director	Notes	Ref.
2016	Road to High&Low	Dan	Shigeaki Kubo		
2016	High&Low The Movie	Dan	Shigeaki Kubo		
2016	High&Low The Red Rain	Dan	Yūdai Yamaguchi		
2017	High&Low The Movie 2 / End of Sky	Dan	Sigeaki Kubo, Tsuyoshi Nakakuki		
2017	High&Low The Movie 3 / Final Mission	Dan	Sigeaki Kubo, Tsuyoshi Nakakuki		
2018	DTC -Yukemuri Junjou Hen- from High&Low	Dan	Shigeaki Kubo	Lead role	
2018	Pan to Bus to Nidome no Hatsukoi ("Our Blue Moment")	Tamotsu Yuasa	Rikiya Imaizumi		
2020	Mellow		Rikiya Imaizumi		
2020	Hachioji Zombies	Takashi Habuki	Osamu Suzuki	Lead role	

=== Short film ===
Year	Title	Role	Director	Ref.
2018	Uta Monogatari: Cinema Fighters Project-"Genkou no Hate"	Yoshiya	Tsukasa Kishimoto	

=== Stage ===
Year	Title	Role	Notes
2009	Gekidan Exile Daiichikai Kōen: Words: Yakusoku/Uragiri: Subete, Ushinawa Reshi Mono no Tame...		
2010	Gekidan Exile Junction#1: Night Ballet		
2010	Gekidan Exile Daiyonkai Kōen: Dance Earth: Negai		
2010	Gekidan Exile Hana-gumi × Kaze Kumiai dō Kōen: Rokudenashi Blues	Hamada	
2013	Gekidan Exile: Attack No.1	Tetsuo Otaki	
2013	Monsieur!	Takashi Tozaki	
2018	Manga Mitai ni Ikanai.	Hirohiko Aramaki	
2018	Hachioji Zombies	Takashi Habuki	Lead
2019	Manga Mitai ni Ikanai.Dai 2 Kan	Hirohiko Aramaki	

=== Radio series ===
Year	Title	Network	Notes
2015－2019	Sandaime J Soul Brothers Kenjiro Yamashita no All Night Nippon	NBS	
2019–	Sandaime J Soul Brothers Yamashita Kenjiro no Zero Base	NBS	

=== TV Program ===
Year	Title	NetWork	Notes	Ref.
2018–	ZIP!	NTV	Tuesday's host	

=== Voice acting ===
Year	Title	Role
2017	HiGH&LOW g-sword Animation DVD Special Edition	Dan

=== Advertisements ===
Year	Title	Notes	Ref.
2015	Shūeisha Bunko "Natsuichi 2015"		
2015–2016	Vadel tokyo		
2016	SoftBank Spo Navi Live		
2018	Nissin (Cup Noodle)		
2019	DHC(Serum)		
2019	Universal Studio Japan Halloween event 2019		
2020	Universal Studio Japan Halloween event 2020		
2020	SNKRDUNK		
2021	Paypay		

=== Music videos ===
Year	Title	Artist	Notes
2018	Double Play	CrazyBoy	
2018	WANAWANA	CRAZY SHIKAKKEI	

== Books ==
Year	Title	Notes	Ref.
2017	50 things that made KENJIRO YAMASHITA who he is. -Vol.1-	Photo essay	
2018	J Soul Brothers III KENJIRO YAMASHITA WORKERS TOOL BOOK	Mook	
2018	50 things that made KENJIRO YAMASHITA who he is. -Vol.2-	Photo essay	
2020	50 things that made KENJIRO YAMASHITA who he is. -Vol.3-	Photo essay	

== Events ==
Year	Title	Notes	Ref.
2016	Nippon Broadcasting System LIVE EXPO TOKYO 2016 ALL LIVE NIPPON Vol.4	Main MC	
2017	Nippon Broadcasting System All Night Nippon 50th Anniversary ALL LIVE NIPPON Vol.5	Main MC	
2018	Nippon Broadcasting System All Night Nippon 50th Anniversary ALL LIVE NIPPON Vol.6	Main MC	
2018	J SOUL BROTHERS III Yamashita Kenjiro no ALL NIGHT NIPPON presents Yama Fes. ~Yamashita Base in YOKOHAMA ARENA~	Producer & MC	
2020	J SOUL BROTHERS III Yamashita Kenjiro no Zero Base presents Yama Fes. ~Yamashita Base in YOKOHAMA ARENA 2020 ~	Producer & MC	

== Awards ==
Year	Organisation	Award	Ref.
2018	Japan Fishing Show	Cool Anglers Award 2019	
2019	DIY Award	Japan DIY Homecenter Show	
2019	Japan Fishing Show	Cool Anglers Award 2020	
2020	Japan Fishing Show	Cool Anglers Award 2021	
