= High&Low The Red Rain =

2016 Japanese action film

- Poster
- Directed by: Yūdai Yamaguchi
- Screenplay by: Yûko Matsuda; Keisuke Makino; Kei Watanabe; Norihisa Hiranuma
- Produced by: Hiroyuki Ueno; Naoto Fujimura; Norihisa Hiranuma; Chikako Nakabayashi; NTetsuya Sakashita
- Starring: Takahiro; Hiroomi Tosaka; Takumi Saitoh
- Cinematography: Jun Fukumoto
- Edited by: Zensuke Hori
- Music by: Yuta Nakano; Agung Gede
- Distributed by: Shochiku
- Release date: October 8, 2016
- Running time: 110 minutes
- Country: Japan
- Language: Japanese
- Box office: ¥1.21 billion

High&Low The Red Rain (stylized as HiGH＆LOW THE RED RAIN) is a 2016 Japanese action film directed by Yūdai Yamaguchi. As the first spin-off of the High&Low franchise, it focuses on the story of the Amamiya brothers, one of the strongest forces in the world of the High&Low franchise. The story starts when younger two find a girl who seems to know the whereabouts of their oldest brother Takeru, who disappeared one year prior. It was released in Japan by Shochiku on October 8, 2016.

On July 16, 2016, the release date of High&Low The Movie, High&Low The Red Rain, and its release date for October 8, 2016, were announced. It was set to be the second original film of the High&Low franchise. The film premiered in Tokyo on September 21, 2016, and it grossed 1.21 billion yen in Japan.

High&Low The Red Rain stars Takahiro, Hiroomi Tosaka and Takumi Saitoh, with Miyu Yoshimoto, Ken Ishiguro, Noémie Nakai, Tatsuya Nakamura, Koichi Iwaki, Naoko Iijima, Tatsuomi Hamada, Akira Onodera, Taiyo Yoshizawa, Shigemitsu Ogi, Reiko Kataoka, Taichi Saotome and Koji Yano in supporting roles. Takanori Iwata, Nobuyuki Suzuki, Keita Machida, Kenjiro Yamashita, Kanta Sato, Taiki Sato, Shuuka Fujii, Nozomi Bando and Akira also appear in the world of the High&Low franchise.

After premiere events held in Taipei and Seoul, the film was released in Taiwan on January 20, 2017, and on April 5, 2017, in South Korea.

== Plot ==
Masaki Amamiya and Hiroto Amamiya, the brothers who boast to be one of the strongest forces in the SWORD area, are very different from each other. Masaki, the older, always enjoys making his younger brother laugh, while Hiroto, the younger, never shows his emotions. They have an elder brother, Takeru Amamiya, and they respected him from the bottom of their hearts. Takeru taught his younger brothers that they should use their fists to protect important things. The Amamiya brothers used to have a happy family, but they lost their parents when they were young. Since then, they protect each other and the bond between the three brothers is strong.

However, a year ago, Takeru suddenly disappeared. Masaki and Hiroto have tried everything to look for his whereabouts. Failing to find their elder brother, at the anniversary of the death of their parents, Masaki and Hiroto visit the family tomb, expecting their elder brother to appear for the special occasion.

However, a mysterious girl named Aika Naruse shows instead, who seems to have clues of Takeru's whereabouts. Wondering why Takeru left them behind and suddenly disappeared, Masaki and Hiroto follow the clues to look for Takeru. When truths about Takeru's disappearance begins to unraveled one after another, the secrets hidden in the past of the Amamiya brothers become clear.

== Cast ==
- Takahiro as Masaki Amamiya. He has superior martial arts skills that can knock down hundreds of opponents. In fighting, he often uses kicking techniques. Together with his younger brother, Hiroto, the two men used to fight Mugen, which consisted of more than 100 people. They are the only men who could equal Kohaku in fightings. Following the clues of the whereabouts of his elder brother Takeru, who disappeared a year ago, he and his younger brother Hiroto head to the SWORD area and encounter Sannoh Rengokai (Hoodlum Squad). Meanwhile, he likes women so much that he always picks up as soon as he sees a beautiful woman. Also, he often gets depressed when he is ignored by his brother Hiroto.
  - Akira Onodera as young Masaki Amamiya.
- Hiroomi Tosaka as Hiroto Amamiya. He is a trouble maker who loves fighting from the bottom of his heart. In contrast to Masaki, he excels in boxing styles. He always works with his older brother Masaki, and the two boast to be the strongest brothers who could equal the powerful Mugen. He obtains clues of the whereabouts of his missing brother Takeru in a fierce fight in Container Street, which leads him to the Nameless Street. He usually acts cool, but once he gets sick, he would become so cute that even his brother Masaki could not handle. He is also gentle enough to help any woman in trouble.
  - Taiyo Yoshizawa as young Hiroto Amamiya.
- Takumi Saitoh as Takeru Amamiya. Takeru is the eldest and the strongest of the Amamiya brothers. He is good at Zero Range Combat. He has a gentle personality and is good at cheering people up. After his parents died, he took care of Masaki and Hiroto and brought them up, but he suddenly left them and disappeared a year ago to go undercover in Kamizonokai of the Kuryu Group, investigating the truth of his parents' death. He secretly helps Aika, who is being hunted for being entrusted with a USB containing confidential information of the Kamizonokai, and hides her in his house. However, he disappears again with the USB.
  - Tatsuomi Hamada as young Takeru Amamiya.
- Miyu Yoshimoto as Aika Naruse. Like Masaki and Hiroto, she is looking for her missing benefactor, Takeru. Before her father, Yukio Naruse, is killed, she is entrusted by him with a USB containing confidential information of the Kamizonokai. She is being hunted by Kamizonokai, while Takeru, who has infiltrated the Kamizonokai, helps her to escape, and then disappears with the USB. Although she seems to have a strong character, her sadness for the loss of her father is enormous.
- Koji Yano as Yukio Naruse, a lawyer who fights against the evils. In order to help those who suffer from illegal land acquisition and illegal debts, he gets a USB containing secrets of the Kamizonokai when he is looking in a case related to the yakuza group. However, immediately after he gets the USB, he is targeted by the Kamizonokai and killed.
- Noémie Nakai as Furuno, a brilliant woman hacker who is entrusted by Takeru with the decryption of the USB containing the secrets of the Kamizonokai. She feels dangers coming to her and therefore calls the house of Takeru for help, and as a result gets in touch with Masaki, Hiroto and Aika by chance. She is then persuaded by them and heads to the SWORD area to work with her old workmate, Noboru of Sannoh Rengokai (Hoodlum Squad), for the decryption of the USB. She always wears black and speaks in a low voice.
- Ken Ishiguro as Tatsuomi Kamizono, leader of Kamizonokai of Kuryu Group, and one of Kuryu Group's nine dragons. He always wears a white suit. He is working with politician Shinohara to build a casino in the SWORD area, and he ruthlessly obliterates anyone who gets in his way. When he finds out that lawyer Yukio Naruse gets a USB containing confidential information about the casino construction, he rushes to Naruse's house to take it back and kill him. He is now looking for the whereabouts of Aika, who runs away with USB.
- Koichi Iwaki as Kimitatsu Kurosaki, leader of Kurosakikai of Kuryu Group, and one of Kuryu Group's nine dragons. He is a man of few words, but he is harsh against his rival Tatsuomi Kamizono and Tatsumi Iemura.
- Naoko Iijima as Rikako Kuze, the beautiful wife of the president of Kuryu Group. In a sexy dress, she criticizes the nine dragons of Kuryu Group in her husband's place.
- Tatsuya Nakamura as Tatsumi Iemura, leader of Iemurakai of Kuryu Group, and one of Kuryu Group's nine dragons. Despite his gentle tone, he has no tolerance for betraying and failing. He is working hand in hand with the police, trying to control the SWORD area.
- Taichi Saotome as Ryu, a member of MIGHTY WARRIORS, who controls the coastal regions with overwhelming strength, and seeks to expand their power to the SWORD area. He is quiet generally, but he would grip his opponent with his blue dragon sword swinging in combat. He gradually shows a ruthless side as he begins to work in Kuryu Group.
- Shigemitsu Ogi as Sosuke Amamiya, father of the Amamiya brothers. Despite being poor, he lived happily with his family. However, the land on which his factory was built was acquired illegally, and he was left heavily in debt. He committed suicide 10 years ago with his wife, Shouko.
- Reiko Kataoka as Shouko Amamiya, mother of the Amamiya brothers. She was good at cooking and she cared for her family. She has been protecting her family with her husband Sousuke, albeit poor, but she committed suicide 10 years ago with her husband.

Hatsunori Hasegawa portrays Shinohara, a corrupted politician who is working with Kamizonokai to lay out a plan of building a casino in the SWORD area. Taro Omiya appears as Ito, Shinohara's private secretary. Masaki Miura plays Hayashi, Kohei Watanabe plays Yagi, both of them are minions of Tatsuomi Kamizono. Takanori Iwata, Nobuyuki Suzuki, Keita Machida, Kenjiro Yamashita, Kanta Sato, Taiki Sato appear as members of Sannoh Rengokai, Cobra, Yamato, Noboru, Dan, Tettsu and Chiharu, respectively. Shuuka Fujii plays Naomi, and Nozomi Bando plays Nika Ijuin; both are staff of the diner "Itokan". Akira also appears in the film as Kohaku, the leader of the former legendary gang Mugen.

== Production ==
To shoot the wild motorcycle race scenes in the film, the crew and cast spent one month in Philippines to shoot many of its action scenes there. Takahiro, Hiroomi Tosaka and Takumi Saitoh also learned martial arts skills, which their characters are good at, in a limited period to make the fight scenes more engaging and tension-filled.

== Release ==
High&Low The Red Rain premiered in Marunouchi Piccadilly Cinema in Tokyo on September 21, 2016, when it was announced that the film would have premiere events in South Korea and Taiwan. The film was released in Japan on October 8, 2016.

On September 29, 2016, the film has its international premiere in Taipei at Lux Cinema. Takahiro and Hiroomi Tosaka visited Taiwan to attend the event, and they are welcomed by more than 1000 fans gathered at the red carpet, and more in the cinema. On January 20, 2017, High&Low The Red Rain was released in Taiwan.

The premiere of High&Low The Red Rain in South Korea was held on October 19, 2016, in Seoul. Takahiro and Hiroomi Tosaka attended the event and greeted the fans of the film in Korean. The film was released in South Korea on April 5, 2017.

== Reception ==
=== Box office ===
High&Low The Red Rain grossed around 298 million yen from 313 screens in its opening weekend, and was third placed at the Japanese box office. The film grossed 1.21 billion yen in total and attracted 923 thousand viewers.

=== Critical response ===
Japan entertainment website Real Sound described the film as "an extremely straight-forward action film", writing that "it develops a story with minimal conversation and thorough action". It was also pointed out that the leading stars added to the film, as not only the experienced Takumi Saitoh but also Takahiro and Tosaka, acted in those action scenes as if they were born to be good fighters. Overall, it found the tension-filled action scenes to be the main charm of the film.

== Sequels ==
=== High&Low The Movie 2 / End of Sky ===
High&Low The Movie 2 / End Of Sky was released on August 19, 2017. It was directed by Sigeaki Kubo and Tsuyoshi Nakakuki.

=== High&Low The Movie 3 / Final Mission ===
High&Low The Movie 3 / Final Mission was released on November 11, 2017. It was directed by Sigeaki Kubo and Tsuyoshi Nakakuki.
