= Hiroomi Tosaka =

Japanese singer and actor

Hiroomi Tosaka 登坂広臣
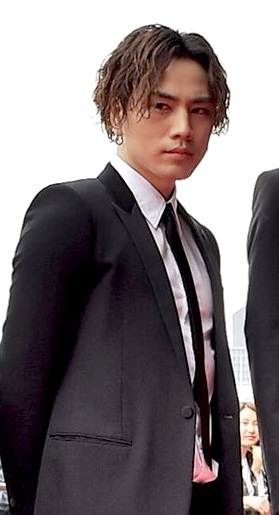

Background information
- Also known as: ØMI; OMI
- Born: March 12, 1987 (age 39); Hamura, Tokyo, Japan
- Genre: J-pop
- Occupations: Singer; actor
- Instrument: Vocals
- Years active: 2010–present
- Labels: LDH Records (present); CDL entertainment (2021–present)
- Website: Official website

Hiroomi Tosaka (登坂 広臣, Tosaka Hiroomi; born March 12, 1987) is a Japanese singer and actor. He is a vocalist of the J-pop group, Sandaime J Soul Brothers He joined the group after winning the Vocal Battle Audition 2 alongside Ryuji Imaichi. As a member of Sandaime J Soul Brothers, he has received the Japan Record Awards twice.

Tosaka debuted as an actor in the 2014 film Hot Road, for which he won the Newcomer of the Year Award at the 38th Japan Academy Film Prize. In 2019, he starred in Yuki no Hana ("Snow Flower"), a romance film based on Mika Nakashima's famous song of the same title.

In 2017, he debuted as a soloist with the digital single "Wasted Love", while remaining a member of Sandaime J Soul Brothers. For his solo activities he uses his birth name stylized as HIROOMI TOSAKA. In April 2019, he released "Blue Sapphire", the theme song for the film Detective Conan: The Fist of Blue Sapphire (名探偵コナン 紺青の拳(こんじょうのフィスト)) included in his single "Supermoon" released on April 10.

On February 20, 2021, as he moved his solo project to his own company CDL entertainment(LDH Records), where he can produce on his own, he changed his stage name as an solo singer into ØMI.

On October 15, 2021, he released the digital single "Answer... Shine". The song "You" on this single was produced by Suga from BTS. It topped iTunes Top Songs Chart in 42 countries and regions around the world, and ranked No. 3 on Billboard World Digital Song Sales Weekly Charts.

== Early life ==
Hiroomi Tosaka was born on March 12, 1987, in Tokyo, Japan. He did not have too much enthusiasm about studying as a high school student, so he decided to go to a technical college for hairstylists after high school without too much consideration about his future. He went to Kubota Barber Beauty College, and after graduation, he worked at a hair salon. He quit his job after 6 months and started to work as a shop assistant at an apparel store in Daikanyamachō, Shibuya. The customers he served during that times included Takahiro and Ryohei Suzuki.

Though he was always fond of singing, he considered being a singer a dream too unrealistic to achieve, and therefore preferred a future as a hairstylist. When he was studying at Kubota Barber Beauty College, Takahiro passed the Vocal Battle Audition 2006: Asian Dream and became a vocalist of Exile. Tosaka was very much impressed and inspired by this since Takahiro had also been a hairstylist before the audition. For this reason, the dream of becoming a singer became serious for him.

== Career ==
In February 2010, Tosaka participated in Exile presents Vocal Battle Audition 2: ~Yume o Motta Wakamono-tachi e~. He received a flyer and decided to have a try, but he did not have any experience at singing besides being good at Karaoke. Since he had not received professional vocal training or sung in public before, he was called the "Cinderella Boy without Experience" during the audition. However, his talent began to show and helped him to pass the audition. He then met Ryuji Imaichi in the second round of the audition, and they both considered each other to be strong competitors after seeing their performances for the first round on Shûkan Exile's coverage of the audition. As Imaichi and Tosaka both were selected as two of the ten finalists after the third round, it was announced that the two winners of Vocal Battle Audition 2 would become the vocalists of the new dance and vocal group Sandaime J Soul Brothers. On September 15, 2010, the final round of the audition was held at Akasaka Blitz music venue, and Tosaka won the audition alongside Ryuji Imaichi. The two became the vocalists of Sandaime J Soul Brothers. A few days later, as they finished the recording of Sandaime J Soul Brothers' first single "Best Friend's Girl", the seven members of Sandaime J Soul Brothers met each other for the first time. On September 27, he made his first public appearance as a singer during the Fantasy Goya-sai: Exile Tamashī (FANTASY後夜祭～EXILE魂～; FANTASY Late Night Festival ~EXILE Soul~) live performance from Exile at Toyota Stadium. On November 10, Tosaka made his mainstream debut as member of Sandaime J Soul Brothers with the single, "Best Friend's Girl".

In February and March 2012, Tosaka participated in VBA Live Tour 2012 Vocal Battle Stage held in Tokyo and Osaka, alongside other LDH's vocalists who have participated in the Vocal Battle Audition. This is the first time he performed without performers after his debut. From 2012 to 2015, Tosaka was a studio commentator for the reality television show Terrace House: Boys × Girls Next Door and the film Terrace House: Closing Door. From November 2012 to March,2013, he also appeared in TBS's music variety show EX-LOUNGE.

In August 2014, he made his acting debut in the film Hot Road. Leading the film alongside Rena Nōnen, he played Hiroshi Haruyama, who was a member of the motorcycle gang "Nights" and fell in love with Rena Nōnen's character Kazuki Miyaichi, a troubled teenage girl. With his role in this film, he won Best New Artist Award at the 39th Hochi Film Awards, Sponichi Grand Prize Newcomer Award at the 69th Mainichi Film Awards, the New Actor Award at the 24th Japan Movie Critics Awards, and the Newcomer of the Year Award as well as Popularity Award at the 38th Japan Academy Film Prize.

In 2015, he released his first solo song "Link" in Sandaime J Soul Brothers' album Planet Seven under the name of the group. He also composed the lyrics to the song, which was his first attempt at lyric composition. In October, he released his first photo essay Nobody Knows, which has sold more than 180 thousand copies. On 15 October, he teamed up with Sandaime J Soul Brothers' performer Naoki Kobayashi and Takanori Iwata to form Sandaime's special sub-unit "The Sharehappi from Sandaime J Soul Brothers from Exile Tribe", and released their one and only single, Share The Love, which is a theme song used in the advertisement for Pocky. On October 21, the first season of the drama High＆Low: The Story of S.W.O.R.D. was broadcast, which was part of the High&Low franchise, the action and music franchise produced by LDH. Tosaka played Hiroto Amamiya, and Takahiro played his older brother Masaki. As the High&Low franchise continued to produce more films, concerts, games, manga in the following years, Tosaka continued to reprise his role in those follow-ups.

In 2016, when Sandaime J Soul Brothers released a documentary about themselves, Born in the EXILE, Tosaka and Ryuji Imaichi, the two vocalists of Sandaime J Soul Brothers, composed the lyrics of the theme song together to express the "soul" of the group. Meanwhile, he also reprised his role as Hiroto Amamiya in TV drama High&Low Season 2 broadcast in April, the film High&Low The Movie released in July. In October, the film High&Low The Red Rain was released. Tosaka, together with Takahiro and Takumi Saitoh, starred in the film as the Amamiya Brothers. Tosaka also released his first songs under his own name when he participated in the soundtracks for the High&Low series. His first solo song under his name, "CHAIN BREAKER", was released in High&Low Original Best Album and was about his character Hiroto Amamiya. He also featured in a few songs of Takahiro's band Ace of Spades, including "SIN", "TIME FLIES", and "THE RED RAIN, which were all about the Amamiya Brothers and were used as soundtracks in the High&Low series.

On July 27, 2017, Tosaka made his solo debut with the digital single "Wasted Love", produced in collaboration with DJ Afrojack who had previously worked together with Sandaime J Soul Brothers. Previous to his solo debut, he also featured in Sandaime's member CrazyBoy (Elly)'s song " OZ Monster feat. OMI" released in February. On September 27, he held his first oversea fan meeting event in Shanghai. On October 13 in the same year, Tosaka released his 2nd digital single "Diamond Sunset". Besides, he also reprised his role as Hiroto Amamiya in the film High&Low The Movie 2 / End Of Sky released in August and High&Low The Movie 3 / Final Mission released in November.

On January 26, 2018, he released his third digital single "Luxe", featuring Sandaime groupmate CrazyBoy(Elly). He also featured in Honest Boyz(a hip-hop unit led by Sandaime's leader Naoto) 's single "BEPPING SOUND feat. HIROOMI TOSAKA" released on June 16. On August 8 in the same year, Tosaka released his first solo album FULL MOON. Additionally, he went on his first solo tour Hiroomi Tosaka Live Tour 2018 "Full Moon" from August 18 to December 23, which attracted about 240,000 attendants during 23 performances in 11 cities. Besides, on a program of LDH TV, the exclusive members-only streaming service of LDH, Tosaka challenged himself to be a Record producer. Together with Sandaime J Soul Brothers' member Elly, he produced singer CRAZY SHIKAKKEI("Crazy Quadrilateral" ). CRAZY SHIKAKKEI is the alias used by Masayasu Yagi in this "Super Star Project", and "WANAWANA", the first single of CRAZY SHIKAKKEI, was released on October 19, 2018, debuting at number one on downloading charts. CRAZY SHIKAKKEI also performed in Tosaka's live in Yokohama Arena on October 24.

In 2019, Tosaka starred in Yuki no Hana("Snow Flower") as Yusuke Watahiki, a romance film based on Mika Nakashima's famous song of the same title. On February 22, 2019, it was announced that Tosaka would be in charge of the theme song for the film Detective Conan: The Fist of Blue Sapphire (名探偵コナン 紺青の拳（こんじょうのフィスト)), titled "Blue Sapphire". In March he released the live footage of his Hiroomi Tosaka Live Tour 2018 "Full Moon" concerts at Saitama Super Arena, which took the first place on Oricon's weekly DVD, BD and joint DVD/BD ranking at the same time with about 59.000 copies sold in the first week. On March 27, it was announced that Tosaka would hold his first performance in Los Angeles at OTAQUEST Live on July 3, alongside other Japanese acts such as M-Flo, Kyary Pamyu Pamyu, CrazyBoy and Yasutaka Nakata. On April 10, Tosaka released his first physical single "Supermoon", which also contained "Blue Sapphire" and have one version of its cover drawn by Gosho Aoyama. Shortly afterwards, he released the sequel and digital single "Supermoon ~Sen~" on July 12. The music video for the title track "Naked Love" was shot in Los Angeles and stars Tosaka alongside American actress Lauren Tsai. On July 20 and 21, Tosaka held his first solo overseas concert in Taiwan titled Hiroomi Tosaka Taipei Concert 2019 Supermoon ~Under the Moonlight~, 3 years after he visited the island for the first time for an overseas premiere of the film High&Low The Red Rain. On November 20, Tosaka released his second physical single "Overdose" on November 20.

On January 8, 2020, Tosaka released his second studio album Who Are You?. In January and February, he had a joint dome tour LDH PERFECT YEAR 2020. SPECIAL SHOWCASE RYUJI IMAICHI / HIROOMI TOSAKA with Ryuji Imaichi. On July 1, the live footage of the joint tour was released and was ranked No.1 on Oricon's weekly DVD, BD and joint DVD/BD ranking at the same time with about 50,547 copies sold in the first week.

On February 17, 2021, it was announced that he would release a new single ANSWER... SHADOW in May and three songs from the single would be pre-delivered for digital streaming in a monthly manner starting with "ANSWER... SHADOW" on February 20. All songs would be produced by himself as he moved his solo project to his own company CDL entertainment, where he can produce on his own. It was also announced that he changed his stage name for his solo project into ØMI.

== Personal life ==
He has an older sister.

He played soccer in his school days, and enjoys following soccer.

He expressed in several occasion that Takahiro has a major influence on his life and his music career. Takahiro's success during the Vocal Battle Audition 1 inspired Tosaka to take part in Vocal Battle Audition 2, which led to his debut as vocalist of Sandaime J Soul Brothers. Takahiro also encouraged him to debut as an actor.

== Discography ==
=== Studio albums ===
Title	Album details	Peak chart positions	Sales
Title	Album details	JPN Oricon	Sales
Full Moon	Released: August 8, 2018; Label: Rhythm Zone; Formats: CD/DVD, CD/Blu-ray	2	
Who Are You?	Released: January 8, 2020; Label: Rhythm Zone; CD, CD/DVD, CD/Blu-ray	2	JPN: 41,231

=== Singles ===
Title	Year	Peak chart positions	
Title	Year	JPN Oricon	JPN Hot 100
"Supermoon"	2019	4	5
"Overdose"	2019	2	—

=== Digital singles ===
Year	Title	Release date	Album
2017	"Wasted Love"	July 27	Full Moon
2017	"Diamond Sunset" (featuring Afrojack)	October 13	Full Moon
2018	"Luxe" (featuring Crazyboy and Afrojack)	January 26	Full Moon
2019	"Blue Sapphire ~Gekijou-ban" (Meitantei Conan Konjou no Fist ver.)	May 24	
2019	"Supermoon ~Sen~"	July 12	

=== Other Solo Songs ===
Year	Title	Release date	album
2015	Link	January 28	Sandaime J Soul Brothers "Planet Seven"
2016	Share The Love	March 30	Sandaime J Soul Brothers "The JSB Legacy"

=== Participating works ===
Year	Title	Artist	Album
2016	SIN	Ace of Spades	High&Low Original Best Album
2016	Chain Breaker	PKCZ	High&Low Original Best Album
2016	Time Flies	Ace of Spades x PKCZ	4REAL
2016	The Red rain	Ace of Spades x PKCZ	
2017	OZ Monster	CrazyBoy	NEOTOKYO EP
2017	Play That	PKCZ	360° ChamberZ
2017	Beauty Mark	PKCZ	360° ChamberZ
2017	T-Rex	PKCZ	360° ChamberZ
2017	Bed Room	PKCZ	360° ChamberZ
2018	First Class Xmas	CrazyBoy	Neotokyo Forever
2018	Bepping Sound	Honest Boyz	
2018	XXX	Sway	Unchained

=== Video releases ===
Title	Details	Peak chart positions	
Title	Details	JPN DVD	JPN BD
Hiroomi Tosaka Live Tour 2018 "Full Moon"	Released: February 27, 2019; Label: Rhythm Zone; Format: 2DVD, 2Blu-ray	1	1
LDH PERFECT YEAR 2020 SPECIAL SHOWCASE RYUJI IMAICHI / HIROOMI TOSAKA	Released: July 1, 2020; Label: Rhythm Zone; Format: 3DVD, 3Blu-ray	1	1

=== Lyrics ===
Year	Title	Artist	Album
2015	Link	Sandaime J Soul Brothers from Exile Tribe	Planet Seven
2016	Beautiful Life	Sandaime J Soul Brothers from Exile Tribe	The JSB Legacy
2016	Born in the Exile	Sandaime J Soul Brothers from Exile Tribe	The JSB Legacy
2017	OZ Monster	CrazyBoy featuring OMI	
2018	Rainbow	Sandaime J Soul Brothers from Exile Tribe	Future
2019	Yes We Are	Sandaime J Soul Brothers from Exile Tribe	
2019	Hanauta ~Flowers for you~	Sandaime J Soul Brothers from Exile Tribe	

== Filmography ==
=== TV shows ===
Year	Title	Network	Notes
2012	Ex-Lounge	TBS	
2013	Terrace House: Boys × Girls Next Door	Fuji TV	

=== TV Dramas ===
Year	Title	Role	Network	Notes	Ref.
2015	High&Low: The Story of S.W.O.R.D.	Hiroto Amamiya	NTV	High&Low Project	
2016	High&Low Season 2	Hiroto Amamiya	NTV	High&Low Project	
2016	Night Hero NAOTO	Himself	TV Tokyo	Episodes 1, 4	

=== Films ===
Year	Title	Role	Notes
2014	Hot Road	Hiroshi Haruyama	Leading role
2015	Terrace House: Closing Door	Himself	Studio commentary
2016	Road to High & Low	Hiroto Amamiya	High&Low Project
2016	High&Low The Movie	Hiroto Amamiya	High&Low Project
2016	High&Low The Red Rain	Hiroto Amamiya	High&Low Project
2017	High&Low The Movie 2 / End Of Sky	Hiroto Amamiya	High&Low Project
2017	High&Low The Movie 3 / Final Mission	Hiroto Amamiya	High&Low Project
2019	Snow Flower	Yusuke Watahiki	Leading role

=== Advertisements ===
Year	Title	Notes	Ref.
2012	Kosé "adidas skin protection"		
2013	Moist Diane "Oil shampoo"		
2014–2016	Samantha Thavasa		
2014–2017	Acecook		
2015–2016	Suntory "THE MALT'S"		
2015–2018	Ezaki Glico "Pocky"		
2015–	Yōfuku no Aoyama		
2015–	Rohto "ROHTO Z!"		
2018	Nissin (Cup Noodle)		

=== Voice acting ===
Year	Title	Role
2017	HiGH&LOW g-sword Animation DVD Special Edition	Hiroto Amamiya

=== Music videos ===
Year	Title	Artist	Notes
2018	Underdog	EXILE SHOKICHI	

== Tie-ups ==
Title	Tie-up
HEY	Theme song for Rohto "ROHTO Z!" CM
DIAMOND SUNSET	Theme song for Rohto "ROHTO Z!" CM
FULL MOON	Theme song for Rohto "ROHTO Z!" CM
FULL MOON	Theme song for Yōfuku no Aoyama CM Sūtsu& Kōto:Ochiba
BLUE SAPPHIRE	Theme song for the film Detective Conan: The Fist of Blue Sapphire

== Bibliography ==
=== Photo essays ===
Year	Title	Notes
2015	Nobody Knows	

== Works ==
=== Artist Production ===
- CRAZY SHIKAKKEI

== Tours ==
Hiroomi Tosaka Live Tour 2018 "Full Moon"(2018)

Hiroomi Tosaka Taipei Concert 2019 Supermoon ~Under the Moonlight~(2019)

LDH Perfect Year 2020 Special Showcase Ryuji Imaichi / Hiroomi Tosaka(2020)

== Awards ==
Year	Ceremony	Award	Nominated work	Result	References
2014	39th Hochi Film Award	Newcomer Award	Hot Road	Won	
2014	38th Japan Academy Prize	Newcomer Actor Award	Hot Road	Won	
2014	69th Mainichi Film Award	Sponichi Grand Prix Newcomer Award	Hot Road	Won	
2014	24th Japanese Film Critics Awards	Newcomer Actor Award (Minami Toshiko Award)	Hot Road	Won	

== Other work ==
On September 29, 2019, Tosaka was officially appointed as a tourism ambassador for Taipei to promote Taipei in Japan.
