= Ryouhei Abe =

Japanese actor

- 阿部 亮平
- Born: March 26, 1980 (age 46); Chita, Aichi, Japan
- Occupation: Actor
- Agent: JFCT
- Website: Official profile

Ryouhei Abe (阿部 亮平, Abe Ryōhei; born March 26, 1980, in Chita, Aichi, Japan) is a Japanese actor who is represented by the talent agency JFCT.

== Biography ==
Abe was a member of a baseball team at Seijoh High School and belongs to a hardball baseball team in Aichi University, which won the 17th All Japan University Quasi Baseball Tournament.

His first role was in Water Boys 2. Afterwards, he started getting regular roles in television dramas. His roles are often yakuza or delinquents, but he has also played comical roles in dramas such as Astro Kyūdan and My Boss My Hero. Abe often plays baseball players, making use of his own baseball skills.

== Filmography ==
=== TV series ===
Year	Title	Role	Notes	Ref.
2013	Yae's Sakura	Ebina Kisaburo	Taiga drama	
2022	Bakumatsu Aibō-den	Kondō Isami	TV movie	
2022	New Nobunaga Chronicle: High School Is a Battlefield	Tadakatsu Honda		
2026	Brothers in Arms	Iwanari Tomomichi	Taiga drama	

=== Film ===
Year	Title	Role	Notes	Ref.
2020	The Voice of Sin			
2022	Niwatori Phoenix			
2024	Savage			
2024	The Three Young-Men in Midnight: The Movie 2	Biker gang leader		
2025	Boy's Wish: We Can Use Magic Once in a Lifetime	Kazuo		
