= DTC: Yukemuri Junjo Hen from High & Low =

2018 Japanese drama film

DTC: Yukemuri Junjou Hen from High & Low
- Poster
- DTC -湯けむり純情篇- from HiGH&LOW
- Directed by: Norihisa Hiranuma
- Screenplay by: Norihisa Hiranuma; Kei Watanabe; Shôhei Fukuda; Daisuke Kamijô
- Produced by: Hiroyuki Ueno; Naoto Fujimura; Yosuke Kiguchi
- Cinematography: Masaya Suzuki
- Edited by: Tsuyoshi Wada
- Distributed by: Shochiku
- Release date: September 28, 2018
- Running time: 102 minutes
- Country: Japan
- Language: Japanese
- Box office: $652 thousand

DTC: Yukemuri Junjou Hen from High & Low (Japanese: DTC -湯けむり純情篇- from HiGH&LOW, 湯けむり純情篇 means Episode Pure Love in Hot Spring) is a 2018 Japanese drama film directed by Norihisa Hiranuma. It's a spin-off of the High&Low series, following the story of High&Low The Movie 3 / Final Mission, it tells the story of how Sannoh Rengokai (Hoodlum Squad) members Dan, Tettsu and Chiharu, the so-called "DTC", spend their time after the fatal war with Kuryu Group. Though the High&Low series have been famous for its action scenes, the film is consist of "0% of fightings, 80% of laugh and 20% of moving scenes" as a road movie, and the DTC gets to lead the film this time.

The film is starred by Kenjiro Yamashita, Kanta Sato, Taiki Sato as Dan, Tettsu and Chiharu, respectively, with Taro Suruga, Yuko Fueki, and Miu Arai joining the cast. It had a limited release in Japan on September 28, 2018.

== Plot ==
Dan, Tettsu, and Chiharu (collectively known as DTC), exhausted from running through exciting days of exposing even national cover-ups, set off on a journey on their motorcycles without even deciding where to go in search of their throbbing hearts and youth (and girls)!

Arriving at the Onsen town(Hot Spring Resort) Kamishimo, they realise they have run out of gas and money. Therefore, they decide to find live-in jobs in the town to earn some travel fees. They find jobs at an Onsen Ryokan(Japanese Inn with Hot Spring) deep into the mountain, the "Moritaya", where they meet a young proprietress Mari and her only daughter Megumi. Chiharu falls in love with Mari, who has lost her husband and is running the inn while raising her daughter by herself, but he sadly finds out that she and manager Miyazaki are attracted to each other.

The three members of DTC make a big proposal plan for Miyazaki in order to encourage Mari and Miyazaki to get married, who have been unable to remarry due to concern of Mari's daughter. With the help of their former friends the Ryukibue brothers (Kabuto Ijuin and Ozawa), the SMG of White Rascals, and the Daruma Babies of Daruma Ikka, the three are on a mission to save Mari and the others' future, but things take an unexpected turn, they are on the brink of failing their plan.

At last, DTC's plan works out, Megumi accepts Miyazaki's proposal of being his daughter, Mari and Miyazaki can finally get married. Taking their salary for their part-time job with them, DTC carries on their journey.

== Cast ==
- Kenjiro Yamashita as Dan, the "D" and the leader of the small sub-unit DTC. He is a mood-maker who speaks in the Kansai dialect, and he runs his family shop "Dan Shoten" on the Sannoh shopping street. When he meets Megumi, he realizes that he and the little girl has something in common, and he tries to help her. His first name is "Kazuya", but his friends always call him by his surname Dan. He says he will fall in love with someone who calls him by his first name out of sudden.
- Kanta Sato as Tettsu, the special attack captain of Sannoh Rengokai (Hoodlum Squad) and the "T" of the small sub-unit DTC. He used to have trademark dreadlocks, but when he finds out that it won't make him popular around girls, he changes to a normal haircut. His family used to run a public bathhouse called "Yamanoyu", but it is no longer in business. After getting a live-in job at Onsen Ryokan "Moritaya", he becomes an idol to the maidservants there, and they love to touch all over his body. He is a passionate man who cares about his fellow man, supporting both Chiharu and Miyazaki, the two men who fall in love with Mari.
- Taiki Sato as Chiharu, the "C" of the small sub-unit DTC. He was a student of Oya Koukou (Oya High School), but he got himself into trouble there and was saved by Yamato of Sannoh Rengokai (Hoodlum Squad). He joined Sannoh Rengokai (Hoodlum Squad) afterward, and he quickly becomes friends with Dan, who has fought alongside him in the war with Kuryu Group, and Tettsu, who is near his age, and the three men begins to calls themselves DTC. He falls in love at first sight with Mari, the proprietress of the "Moritaya", where he gets a live-in job, but when he finds out she is in love with Miyazaki, he withdraws from his pursuit. Because he wants Mari to be happy, he sparks a big proposal plan to encourage the two of them to get married, and he gets help from his friends.
- Yuko Fueki as Morita Mari, the young proprietress of Onsen Ryokan "Moritaya". After the death of her husband five years ago, she has been running the inn and raising her daughter Megumi on her own. She agrees to give the penniless DTC live-in jobs, to the surprise of many. Though she has a certain feeling towards Miyazaki, she will not even think of remarriage for her daughter.
- Taro Suruga as Miyazaki Yoki, the manager of "Moritaya". He hires DTC as live-in part-time workers. He has a close relationship with Mari but is unable to propose to her with consideration of the feeling of Mari's daughter Megumi. Sensing his feelings, DTC decides to carry out a grand plan of proposing for him. He is good at singing and guitar.
- Miu Arai as Morita Megumi, Mari's daughter. She is aware of the close relationship between her mother and Miyazaki, but she is not in favor of their marriage as she is afraid that her mother would forget her father. After her acquaintance with Dan, she gradually regains her cheerful girlishness.
- Nobuyuki Suzuki as Yamato, the strong and single-minded man who leads Sannoh Rengokai (Hoodlum Squad) with Cobra. He has a deep bond with his friends, and as his family runs the "Asahina Maintenance," he helps DTC to customise their bikes, and give them helmets with the original "DTC" logo as presents to supports the trip of DTC.
- Fumihiko Tachiki as the owner snack "Kazeshita". He would treats his customers with his thick, astringent and beautiful voice through microphone. He is a kind-hearted and caring person, and he introduces the penniless DTC to "Moritaya".
- Eri Murakawa as Aki. She is a hostess at the snack "Kazeshita" in the Onsen town Kamishimo. She always wears sexy clothes and duets with Dan. She has a spirit of service and actively participates in DTC's proposal plan for Miyazaki.

Masayasu Yagi plays Kabuto Ijuin, the so-called "Crabman ", and Kousei Amano plays Ozawa, who wants to be popular around girls more than anything. The two form the duet "Vertical Flute Brothers" and go on a nationwide tour booked by Ozawa fathers out of parental love, but Ozawa feels so uneasy that he asks DTC to accompany them on the tour. Ikki Nishimura, Tomoki Hirose, Shunsuke Nishikawa, Ryo Matsuda portrays Heidi, Marco, Lassie, Cosette, respectively. They are the members of SMG, the new special fighting groups of White Rascals. Instructed by White Rascals' leader Rocky, they go on a comfort trip with those women protected by White Rascals, when they meet their old friends DTC and Tettsu ask them to direct Miyazaki's big proposal. Masaru Mizuno, Shunsuke Tanaka, Koji Moriya, and Yuki Izawa appear as Daruma Ikka's members Futa, Raita, Agyo, and Ungyo, respectively. They open a shooting range in the Onsen town Kamishimo and are approached by Tettsu, who asks them to help building and decorating the venue for Miyazaki's proposal.

== Release ==
DTC: Yukemuri Junjou Hen from High&Low was released limitedly in Japan on September 28, 2018, for three weeks. On October 17, 2018, it was announced that 27 cinemas in Japan would continue to show the film for a few more weeks due to its well-reception.

=== Marketing ===
DTC: Yukemuri Junjou Hen from High&Low was announced on June 16, 2018, together with its first waves of promotional materials, and it was also announced that the film would be released on September 28, 2018. The first trailer was released on June 19, while it was also announced that Doberman Infinity has made a new song "You& I" for the film as its theme song, and hip hop group Honest Boy would provide a new song for the film score. A new poster was released on July 6, with scenes of the film on the poster, it was confirmed that other characters from the High&Low series, Yamato for example, would appear in the film. On August 21, the film premiered on special event PKCZ®×DTC -Yukemuri Junjou Hen- from High&Low Advance Screening Event & Premium Live Show in Makuhari Messe International Exhibition Hall 1–3, while the music video with film characters of the theme song "You& I" was released on the same day. Another premiere event was held on September 10 in United Cinema Toyosu in Tokyo. On September 25, NTV aired the film's special program "DTC -Yukemuri Junjou Hen- from High&Low openly straight ahead SP! to introduce the film.

Akira Hiramoto drew a short manga series for the film, and it was published on Weekly Shōnen Magazine on September 26 and October 3, 2018. Clamp also revived their collaboration with the High&Low Series and released a new short "High&Low g-sword" manga on Weekly Shōnen Magazine on September 26, with DTC as its main characters.

== Reception ==
=== Box office ===
DTC: Yukemuri Junjou Hen from High&Low grossed 652,000 in total for a limited release.

=== Critical response ===
Japanese Media Real Sound described the film as "a relaxing film", and pointed out that it uses music differently from previous High&Low films, as music has helped to set background and atmosphere for different scenes in the film. Meanwhile, Real Sound also loved that DTC: Yukemuri Junjou Hen from High&Low combines its plots with clever twists on those familiar and handsome soundtracks from the High&Low series, creating a lot of laughs by creating contrast. On top of that, the film has plenty of comedic interludes, which are rare in the series."

Real Sound also pointed out that though the film had a lot of hilarious slapstick parts, it was also a film that makes you laugh and then breathe a sigh of relief, adding that "The theme song 'You & I' sung at the end of the work expressed the film's unique sense of sadness and pleasure in moving forward under the interplay of encounters and partings, which echoes with the emotions of the audiences."
