= Taiki Sato =

Japanese dancer and actor (born 1995)

- 佐藤 大樹
- Born: 25 January 1995 (age 31); Shiraoka, Saitama Prefecture, Japan
- Occupations: Dancer, actor
- Years active: 2011–present
- Musical career
- Genres: J-pop, dance
- Labels: LDH, Rhythm Zone
- Member of: Exile, Fantastics from Exile Tribe
- Website: Taiki Sato

Taiki Sato (佐藤 大樹, Satō Taiki; born 25 January 1995) is a Japanese dancer and actor. He is the leader of the Japanese group Fantastics from Exile Tribe.

== Life and career ==
In 2009, Taiki got interested in dancing due to his mother's invitation to watch "Exile Live Tour 2009 The Monster", he then joined Tokyo's EXPG.

In 2011, he started his activities as both an actor and a back dancer for Generations from Exile Tribe.

In February 2014, he participated in "Exile Performer Battle Audition" and in April of the same year he became one of five people who passed the final audition to join Exile as performers.

In April 2015, he appeared in NTV's drama "Wild Heroes", followed by NTV's drama "High & Low The Story Of S.W.O.R.D." in October of the same year.

On December 29, 2016, he was announced as a member and leader (alongside Exile's member Sekai) of the unit Fantastics from Exile Tribe which released their major debut single "Over Drive" on December 5, 2018.

== Filmography ==
=== Movies ===
Year	Title	Role	Notes	Ref.
2014	Our Tomorrow	Takuya Aihara		
2016	High&Low The Movie	Chiharu		
2017	Marmalade Boy	Ginta Suou		
2018	My Teacher, My Love	Kotake Sawada		
2018	DTC -Yukemuri Junjou Hen- from High&Low	Chiharu		
2019	You Are Brilliant Like a Spica	Taiyo Udagawa	Lead role	
2019	Majo ni Kogarete	Masato	Short film	
2020	Our Story	Ichiya Chitani	Lead role	
2025	My Special One	Sho		
2025	Romantic Killer	Mysterious sword		

=== TV dramas ===
Year	Title	Role	Notes	Ref.
2014	Minowa: Love and Law	Yuji Akiyoshi	Eps. 11 and 12	
2016	Night Hero Naoto		Ending dance	
2020	Terror Newspaper	Yusuke Matsuda		
2023	Around 1/4	Kosuke Nitta	Lead role	
2024	Man Who Will Not Divorce	Yuu Misago		
2024	A Suffocatingly Lonely Death	Jun Suzuki		
2024	Ripe for the Picking	Senri Kagiya	Lead role	
2025	Masked Ninja Akakage	Akakage	Lead role	

=== TV shows ===
Year	Title	Notes	Ref.
2016	Dancer's Pride		

=== Music videos ===
Year	Title	Artist	Notes	Ref.
2011	Love Letter	Funky Monkey Babys		
2015	Kimi ga Ita kara	Crystal Kay		
