= Hokuto Yoshino =

Japanese singer, performer and actor (born 1997)

- 吉野北人
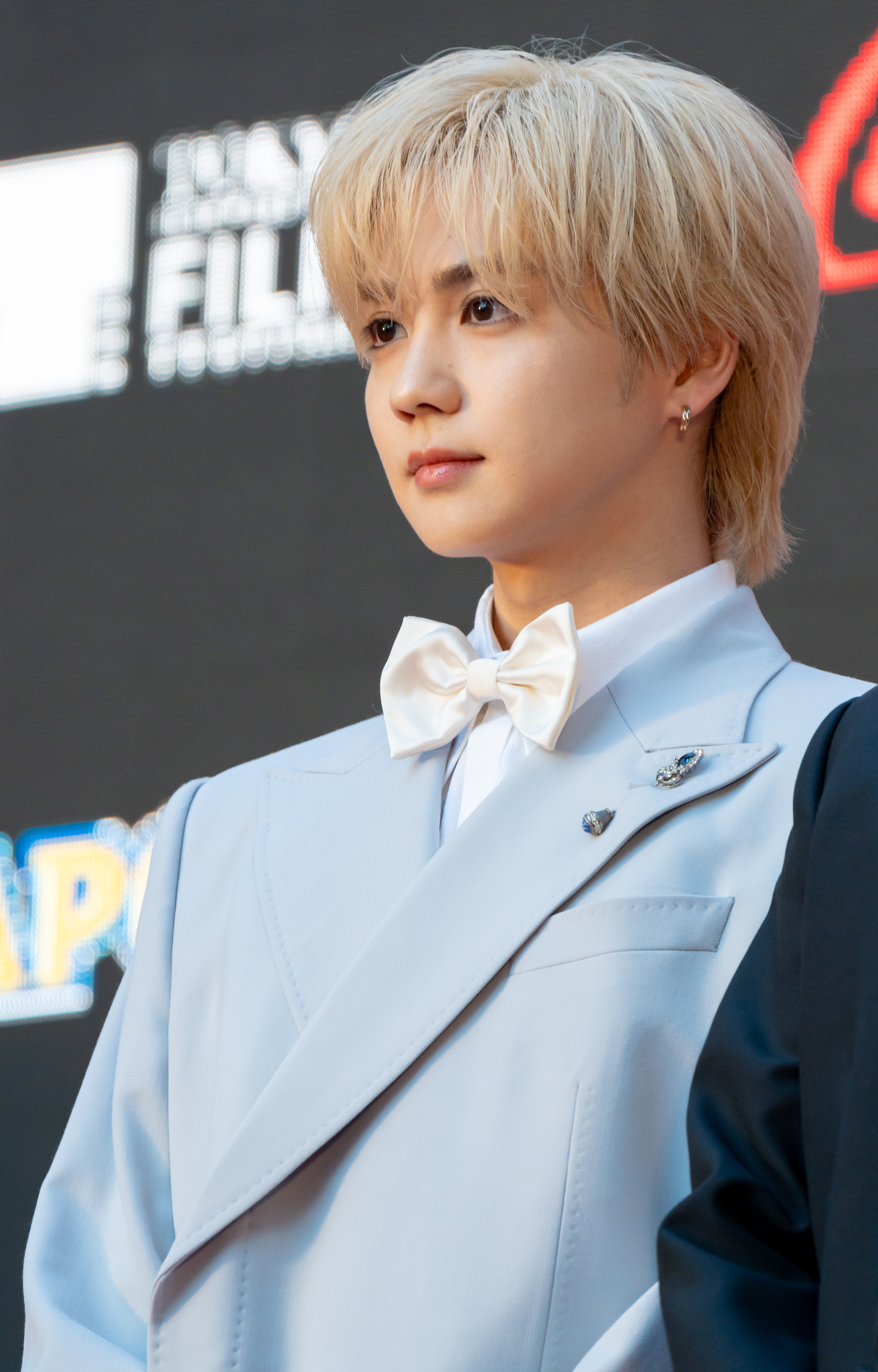
- Yoshino at Tokyo International Film Festival in October 2023
- Born: 6 March 1997 (age 29); Miyazaki Prefecture, Japan
- Occupations: Singer; actor
- Agent: LDH
- Musical career
- Genre: J-pop
- Instrument: Vocals
- Years active: 2014–present
- Label: Rhythm Zone
- Member of: The Rampage from Exile Tribe

Hokuto Yoshino (吉野北人, Yoshino Hokuto; born March 6, 1997), is a Japanese singer, performer and actor. He is a member of J-Pop group The Rampage from Exile Tribe.

Yoshino is represented with LDH.

== Early life ==
Hokuto Yoshino was born on March 6, 1997, in Miyazaki Prefecture, Japan. He has been playing basketball since third grade. When he was in elementary school, his basketball coach told him that he should join the entertainment industry which sparked his first interest in that sector. In junior high school, he won the Miyazaki Basketball Tournament (a prefectural championship) and the best player award. At that time, he also got to know Exile through researching them after a classmate mentioned his resemblance to Exile's Takahiro. This led him to aspire to become a full-fledged singer from high school on. The first time he sang in front of an audience was at a cultural festival of his high school where he performed the song "I love you" by Yutaka Ozaki. Afterwards, Yoshino started to take simple singing lessons and participate in karaoke competitions in his hometown. Ultimately, he also tried out for various auditions.

His classmates in high school included Kanta Sato and fellow The Rampage member Shogo Iwaya.

== Career ==
Since he liked Exile, Yoshino decided to participate in the Vocal Battle Audition 4 - For Young People with Dreams at the age of 17. During the training camp of the audition he struggled with learning to dance since he had no prior experience but was assisted by Ryuta Hidaka (now member of Ballistik Boyz). At last, Yoshino passed the audition as one of three winners out of 30 thousand contestants alongside Kazuma Kawamura and Riku Aoyama and became a vocal candidate for The Rampage in April 2014. He was selected as an official member of the group after completing their musha shugyo.

In January 2017, The Rampage from Exile Tribe made their debut with the single "Lightning".

In 2018, he made his acting debut in the film Prince of Legend, playing the role of "Team Next's" prince Koki Tendo. On February 14, 2019, he attended the Prince of Legend Premium Live Show, a fan-meeting with the whole Prince of Legend cast, at Yokohama Arena. There, he performed "Too Shy", a cover of Kajagoogoo's 80s hit and insert song of the film, with Makoto Hasegawa and Itsuki Fujiwara who played the remaining members of "Team Next". On September 7 in the same year, Yoshino was invited to the 29th Tokyo Girls Collection (Autumn/Winter) at Saitama Super Arena together with the main cast of the movie High & Low The Worst in which he stars as Tsukasa Takajo. This marked the first time he attended any fashion related event and walked a runway in his career. A few months after, he also appeared at the 30th Tokyo Girls Collection (Spring/Summer) alongside the main cast of the movie Kizoku Tanjou -Prince Of Legend-.

== Discography ==
=== As featured artist ===
Title	Year	Peak chart position	Album	Ref.
Title	Year	JPN Hot	Album	Ref.
"Too Shy" M-flo Presents Prince Project feat. Yoshino Hokuto	2018	–	Non-album single	

== Filmography ==
=== Films ===
Year	Title	Role	Notes	Ref.
2019	Prince of Legend	Koki Tendo		
2019	High&Low The Worst	Tsukasa Takajo		
2020	Aristocratic Birth: Prince of Legend - The Movie	Koki Tendo		
2020	Kiss Him, Not Me	Asuma Mutsumi	Lead role	
2022	High&Low: The Worst X	Tsukasa Takajo		
2023	My (K)night	Toki	Lead role	
2025	Suicide Notes Laid on the Table	Shuya Ikenaga	Lead role	
2026	Love Me Kill Me	Mitsuhiro Todo	Lead role	
2027	High&Low: The New World			
2027	Last Vacation	Katsuyuki Sawa	Lead role	

=== TV dramas ===
Year	Title	Role	Notes	Ref.
2018	Prince of Legend	Koki Tendo		
2019	High&Low: The Worst Episode.0	Tsukasa Takajo		
2019	Aristocratic Birth: Prince of Legend	Koki Tendo		
2020	Toshi no Sakon	Sean Ichinose	Episodes 3 and 4	
2021	Tokyo Noodle Factory	Kōtarō Akamatsu	Lead role	
2024	1122: For a Happy Marriage	Rei Ikebata		

=== TV shows ===
Year	Title	Notes	Ref.
2019	Monomane Grand Prix	Judge	

=== Commercials ===
Year	Title	Notes	Ref.
2017	Daiichi Kosho Live Dam Stadium	with other LDH artists	

=== Game appearances ===
Year	Title	Role	Notes	Ref.
2019	Prince of Legend Love Royale	Koki Tendo	Released on March 5; Available on iOS / Android	
