= Makoto Hasegawa =

Makoto Hasegawa may refer to:

- Makoto Hasegawa (basketball)
- Makoto Hasegawa (dancer)
