= Red Blue =

Japanese manga series

- First tankōbon volume cover

レッドブルー (Reddo Burū)
- Genre: Sports
- Manga
- Written by: Atsushi Namikiri
- Published by: Shogakukan
- Imprint: Shōnen Sunday Comics
- Magazine: Weekly Shōnen Sunday
- Original run: January 12, 2022 – present
- Volumes: 19
- Television drama
- Directed by: Takayuki Hayashi; Takeshi Furusawa
- Written by: Shuho Takase; Hikaru Kimura; Keita Meguro
- Studio: C&I Entertainment
- Original network: MBS, TBS
- Original run: December 18, 2024 – February 12, 2025
- Episodes: 8
- icon

Red Blue (Japanese: レッドブルー, Hepburn: Reddo Burū) is a Japanese manga series written and illustrated by Atsushi Namikiri. It began serialization in Shogakukan's shōnen manga magazine Weekly Shōnen Sunday in January 2022. A live-action television drama adaptation aired from December 2024 to February 2025.

== Characters ==
Aoba Suzuki (鈴木青葉, Suzuki Aoba)
Portrayed by: Keito Kimura
Kenshin Akazawa (赤沢拳心, Akazawa Kenshin)
Portrayed by: Taiga Tsubaki
Sannosuke Iwase (岩瀬三之助, Iwase Sannosuke)
Portrayed by: Makoto Hasegawa
Kanenari Tokiwa (時和金成, Tokiwa Kanenari)
Portrayed by: Gaku Sano
Wataru Amachi (雨地渉, Amachi Wataru)
Portrayed by: Show Kasamatsu
Kota Tamamatsu (玉松光太, Tamamatsu Kōta)
Portrayed by: Eiku Yamashita
Yuga Hazuru (羽鶴結雅, Hazuru Yuga)
Portrayed by: Naru Okubo
Ganmaru Nueji (鵺路雁丸, Nueji Ganmaru)
Portrayed by: Kaisei Takechi
Amu Hiiragi (柊愛矛, Hīragi Amu)
Portrayed by: Takato Okura
Mamoru Hachiya (鉢屋守, Hachiya Mamoru)
Portrayed by: Kazuma Sumi

== Media ==
=== Manga ===
Written and illustrated by Atsushi Namikiri, Red Blue began serialization in Shogakukan's shōnen manga magazine Weekly Shōnen Sunday on January 12, 2022. Its chapters have been compiled into nineteen tankōbon volumes as of September 2026.

==== Volumes ====
No.	Release date	ISBN
1	April 18, 2022	978-4-09-851123-5
2	June 17, 2022	978-4-09-851124-2
3	September 15, 2022	978-4-09-851264-5
4	December 16, 2022	978-4-09-851479-3
5	March 16, 2023	978-4-09-851773-2
6	June 16, 2023	978-4-09-852125-8
7	September 15, 2023	978-4-09-852843-1
8	December 18, 2023	978-4-09-853050-2
9	March 18, 2024	978-4-09-853180-6
10	June 18, 2024	978-4-09-853378-7
11	September 18, 2024	978-4-09-853574-3
12	December 18, 2024	978-4-09-853806-5
13	March 18, 2025	978-4-09-854021-1
14	June 18, 2025	978-4-09-854152-2
15	September 18, 2025	978-4-09-854240-6
16	December 18, 2025	978-4-09-854373-1
17	March 18, 2026	978-4-09-854488-2
18	June 18, 2026	978-4-09-854652-7
19	September 16, 2026	978-4-09-854815-6

=== Drama ===
A live-action television drama adaptation was announced in the 43/2024 issue of Weekly Shōnen Sunday published on September 18, 2024. The drama is produced by C&I Entertainment and directed by Takayuki Hayashi and Takeshi Furusawa, with scripts written by Shuho Takase, Hikaru Kimura, and Keita Meguro, action direction by Keiya Tabuchi, and MMA supervision by Yushin Okami. It aired on MBS and TBS's "Dramaism" programming block from December 18, 2024 to February 12, 2025. The theme song, "My Pride", is performed by Ma55ive the Rampage.

=== Other ===
In July 2023, a collaboration with mixed martial arts organization GRACHAN was announced. The series sponsored a high school tournament called "MMA Koshien" organized by GRACHAN. The tournament itself was initially depicted in the series. Regional qualifiers took place from September to December 2023, while the national tournament took place in February 2024.

== Reception ==
The series' seventh volume featured a recommendation from mixed martial artist Kyoji Horiguchi. It was nominated for the 70th Shogakukan Manga Award in 2024.

== See also ==
- Switch, another manga series by the same author
