= Genderless fashion in Japan =

Fashion subculture

"Genderless" (ジェンダーレス, Jendāresu) is a fashion subculture that emerged in Japan in the mid-2010s. Aiming to break societal gender norms in fashion, the genderless subculture is centered on gender non-conforming androgynous fashion. The subculture is mostly dominated by men, who are known as "genderless men" (ジェンダーレス男子, jendāresu danshi).

== Characteristics ==
People who are part of the genderless subculture are known as "genderless men" (ジェンダーレス男子, jendāresu danshi) or "genderless women" (ジェンダーレス女子, jendāresu joshi), who dress androgynously without conforming to societal gender norms. The term "genderless" was coined by talent agent Takashi Marumoto to describe actor and model Toman, one of the influential figures of the genderless subculture. Men who are part of the subculture are idealized as "slim-bodied" and "cute-faced", using hair dye and makeup to accentuate their appearance, alongside flashy clothing and "cute" accessories.

The genderless subculture is seen as a rejection of traditional gender roles. Unlike in the West, the subculture is more associated with fashion than sexuality or gender identity, and is not considered to be a person attempting to "pass" as the opposite gender, or declaring themselves gay or transgender. Masafumi Monden, a researcher from the University of Technology Sydney, as well as several genderless men, have reasoned that this is because Japanese society puts a clear separation between appearance and sexuality. However, some men have stated that being part of the genderless subculture has made them more accepting of other sexualities.

== History ==
Historically, Japanese culture has portrayed feminine men and masculine women in the context of theatre and performance, involving cross-dressing, men performing women's roles in kabuki (known as onnagata), and all-female performance companies such as the Takarazuka Revue. Unisex fashion for men has also been expressed through anime and manga.

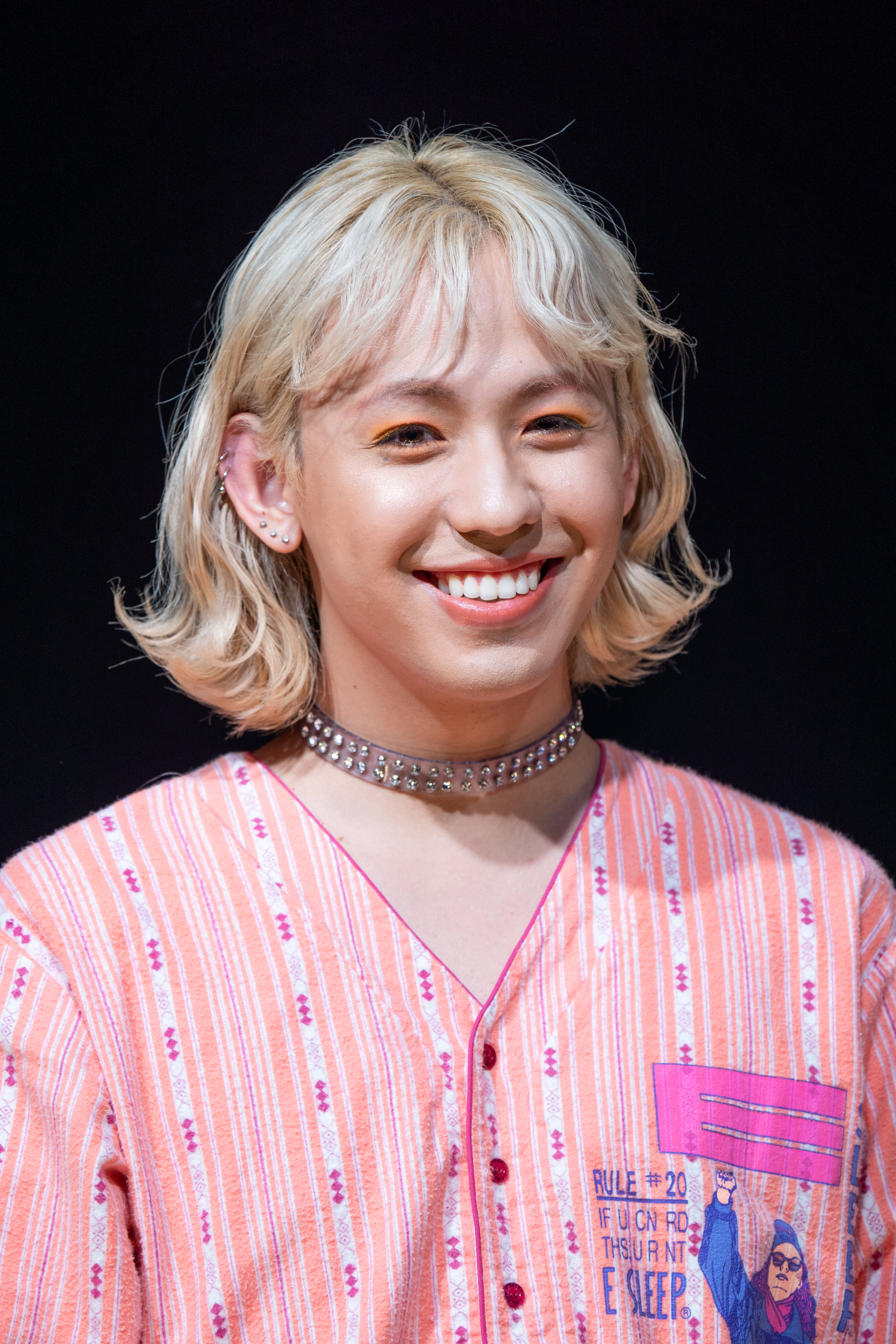
Ryuchell (2019) is one of the three people credited for popularizing the genderless subculture.

Modern genderless fashion originated in the Harajuku district of Tokyo. The earliest influence is JW Anderson's Fall 2013 collection, of which featured male models in feminine clothing during its showcase. By 2015, genderless fashion gained popularity in Japan. It and drew heavy influences from the androgynous styling of South Korean K-pop boy bands, visual kei, and fashion from the 1980s and 1990s in the United States. Influential figures for the genderless subculture are actor and model Toman; model and media personality Ryuchell; and media personality Genking. (Note: Genking later came out as a transgender woman in 2017.) One of the few notable figures for genderless women in media is actor and model Satsuki Nakayama; (Note: Satsuki Nakayama later came out as a transgender man in 2021.) however, there are fewer genderless women in entertainment compared to genderless men. Junko Mitsuhashi, a professor of gender studies at Meiji University, has suggested that genderless fashion may have come about from young men who were "jealous of women because they can express themselves through fashion." Most fans of genderless men are young girls.

The first instance of the term "genderless men" appeared in 2015 to describe Toman. By 2016, genderless fashion had been popularized through social media websites such as Instagram and Tumblr. In 2017, En Coton, a tailoring company, opened an online service called Madam M, claiming to be the first clothing repair store for LGBT people in Tokyo, with options for "genderless" custom orders.

== In media ==
In addition to genderless people appearing in entertainment, several genderless men have appeared as characters in media, such as Cecile no Mokuromi (2017) and My Androgynous Boyfriend (2018). Hugtto! PreCure (2018) gained media attention through an episode focusing Henri Wakamiya, a character with a genderless appearance; his episode arc also included the line, "Even boys can become princesses!" from protagonist Cure Yell, which led media to speculate he may become the first male Pretty Cure in the history of the franchise. In 2018, the magazine Da Vinci cited Kuranosuke Koibuchi from Princess Jellyfish, Oscar François de Jarjayes from The Rose of Versailles (1972), Marie-Joseph Sanson from Innocent (2013), Tetsuo from Yūreitō (2011), Haruhi Fujioka from Ouran High School Host Club (2003), Sailor Uranus from Sailor Moon (1991), Ukyo Kuonji from Ranma ½ (1987), Sapphire from Sapphire: Princess Knight (2008), Kyubei Yagyu from Gin Tama (2003) as retrospective examples of genderless characters in manga.

== See also ==
- Androgyny in fashion
- X-gender
- Japanese street fashion
- Unisex
