= My Androgynous Boyfriend =

Japanese manga series by Tamekou

- Cover of volume 1 of the Japanese version, first released on December 7, 2018

ジェンダーレス男子に愛されています。 (Jendāresu Danshi ni Aisareteimasu)
- Genre: Romantic comedy, Slice of life
- Manga
- Written by: Tamekou
- Published by: Shodensha
- English publisher: NA: Seven Seas Entertainment
- Imprint: Feel Comics FC Swing
- Magazine: Feel Young
- Original run: February 8, 2018 – March 8, 2023
- Volumes: 5
- Television drama

Colorful Love: My Androgynous Boyfriend
- Directed by: Izuru Kumasaka; Hiroaki Yuasa; Takeshi Matsuura
- Written by: Fumi Tsubota
- Music by: Akihiro Manabe
- Studio: ytv
- Original network: NNS (ytv, Nippon TV)
- Original run: April 1, 2021 – June 4, 2021
- Episodes: 10

My Androgynous Boyfriend (Japanese: ジェンダーレス男子に愛されています。, Hepburn: Jendāresu Danshi ni Aisareteimasu; lit. "I'm Loved By a Genderless Boy") is a Japanese manga series by Tamekou. It was serialized in the monthly josei manga magazine Feel Young from February 2018 to March 2023. A television drama adaptation, titled Colorful Love: My Androgynous Boyfriend (カラフラブル～ジェンダーレス男子に愛されています。～, Karafu Raburu: Genderless Danshi ni Aisareteimasu), aired from April to June 2021, on Yomiuri TV, Nippon Television and their affiliates as part of the MokuDra F programming block.

== Plot ==
Wako works as a manga editor at a publishing department, while her boyfriend, Meguru, is a model and a clerk at a clothing store with a large social media following. Meguru is part of the genderless fashion subculture and is knowledgeable about make-up and fashion, causing other people around the couple to tend to mistake the nature of their relationship, as well as Meguru's gender.

== Characters ==
Wako Machida (町田 わこ, Machida Wako) (Note: For the live-action television drama adaptation, Wako and Meguru's first names were given kanji characters, Wako (和子) and Meguru (周).)
Portrayed by: Ai Yoshikawa
Wako works as a manga editor at a publishing company. She does not pay attention to her looks often.
Meguru Sōma (相馬 めぐる, Sōma Meguru)
Portrayed by: Rihito Itagaki
Meguru is an androgynous model and a clothing store clerk with a large social media following. He partakes in the genderless fashion subculture and is knowledgeable about fashion and make-up.
Sasame Tachi (舘 ささめ, Tachi Sasame)
Portraed by: Takuya Kusakawa
Sasame is an androgynous artist with a cute, dreamy appearance. He is in an idol group with Meguru as the Unicorn Boys; however, he dislikes cute clothing and wants to be seen as manly, using his idol Aki from Exilia as an example.
Kira (キラ)
Portrayed by: Renn Kiriyama
Kira is an androgynous model with a "cool" and "beautiful" appearance.
Asahi Tetsumoto (鉄本 あさひ, Tetsumoto Asahi)
Portrayed by: Miki Mizuno
An original character for the television drama adaptation, Asahi is Wako's co-worker and works in the same manga editing department, in addition to being Kira's love interest.
Masami Sakai (境 正美, Sakai Masami)
Portrayed by: Oideyasu Oda
An original character for the television drama adaptation, Masami is Wako's co-worker who works in the same department as a manga editor.

== Media ==
=== Manga ===
My Androgynous Boyfriend is written and illustrated by Tamekou as her first work outside of the yaoi genre. It is serialized in the monthly manga magazine Feel Young, beginning in the March 2018 issue released on February 8, 2018. The series will end serialization in the April 2023 issue released on March 8, 2023. The chapters have been released in five tankōbon by Shodensha under the Feel Comics FC Swing imprint.

To celebrate the release of the second volume, an art exhibit was featured at the Animate Girls Festival 2019. Tamekou herself hosted a panel with genderless actor and model Toman as a guest.

At Anime Expo 2019, Seven Seas Entertainment announced that they had licensed the series in English for North American distribution.

No.	Original release date	Original ISBN	English release date	English ISBN
1	December 7, 2018	978-4-396-76752-5	February 11, 2020	978-1-64505-198-5
2	November 8, 2019	978-4-396-76774-7	September 22, 2020	978-1-64505-516-7
3	November 7, 2020	978-4-396-76810-2	September 14, 2021	978-1-64827-931-7
4	November 8, 2021	978-4-39676-843-0	April 30, 2024	978-1-64827-286-8
5	July 7, 2023	978-4-39676-890-4	December 17, 2024	978-1-63858-693-7

=== Television drama ===
A live-action television series adaptation, titled Colorful Love: My Androgynous Boyfriend (カラフラブル～ジェンダーレス男子に愛されています。～, Karafu Raburu: Genderless Danshi ni Aisareteimasu) was announced on March 2, 2021. Produced by Yomiuri TV, the series began airing on April 1, 2021, on ytv, Nippon TV and their affiliates as part of their MokuDra F programming block, with 10 episodes scheduled. Colorful Love stars Ai Yoshikawa and Rihito Itagaki as Wako Machida and Meguru Sōma respectively. Additional cast members include Renn Kiriyama as Kira and Miki Mizuno as Asahi Tetsumoto. Oideyasu Oda was later announced as a regular cast member, appearing as Masami Sakai. Hirotsugu Otsu and Kōsei Awaji, who are members of the group Kougu Ishin and the comedy duo Kitsune, made a guest appearance in episode 1 as part of a collaboration. The series is directed by Izuru Kumasaka, Hiroaki Yuasa, and Takeshi Matsuura, with Fumi Tsubota in charge of the script and Akihiro Manabe in charge of the soundtrack. The show's theme song is "Question" by Amber's.

==== Episode list ====
No.	Title	Directed by	Original release date
1	"Birth of an eye-pleasing couple! A fated reunion" Transliteration: "Ganpuku kappuru tanjō! Unmei no saikai" (Japanese: 眼福カップル誕生! 運命の再会)	Izuru Kumasaka	April 1, 2021
2	"Starting to date! Anomaly with the eye-pleasing couple?" Transliteration: "Otameshi kousai sutāto! Ganpuku kappuru ni ihen?" (Japanese: お試し交際スタート! 眼福カップルに異変?)	Izuru Kumasaka	April 8, 2021
3	"Impulsive kiss... The reason for Meguru's tears" Transliteration: "Shōdō no kisu... Meguru no namida no riyū wa" (Japanese: 衝動のキス…めぐるの涙の理由は)	Izuru Kumasaka	April 15, 2021
4	"Shaken by the sudden kiss! Feelings growing apart" Transliteration: "Totsuzen no kisu ni dōyō! Surechigau omoi" (Japanese: 突然のキスに動揺! すれ違う想い)	Hiroaki Yuasa	April 22, 2021
5	"Living together! A world broadened by love" Transliteration: "Dōsei seikatsu sutāto! Koi de hirogaru sekai" (Japanese: 同棲生活スタート! 恋で広がる世界)	Izuru Kumasaka	April 29, 2021
6	"New development! Formation of a pretty boy group" Transliteration: "Shintenkai! Bishōnen yunitto kessei" (Japanese: 新展開! 美少年ユニット結成)	Hiroaki Yuasa	May 6, 2021
7	"Pretty boy group launches! Turbulent development..." Transliteration: "Bishōnen yunitto hirō! Haran no tenkai..." (Japanese: 美少年ユニット披露! 波乱の展開…)	Takeshi Matsuura	May 13, 2021
8	"Cohabiting couple MeguWako's day off" Transliteration: "Dōsei kappuru "meguwako" no kyūjitsu" (Japanese: 同棲カップル“めぐわこ”の休日)	Hiroaki Yuasa	May 20, 2021
9	"Outcome of birthday date... Fate where pleasantries diverge" Transliteration: "Tanjōbi dēto no yukue... Jirei ga wakatsu unmei" (Japanese: 誕生日デートのゆくえ…辞令が分かつ運命)	Izuru Kumasaka	May 27, 2021
10	"Future chosen by the new generation couple" Transliteration: "Shinjidai kappuru ga erabitoru mirai" (Japanese: 新時代カップルが選び取る未来)	Izuru Kumasaka	June 4, 2021

== Reception ==
Rebecca Silverman from Anime News Network praised My Androgynous Boyfriend for its artwork and "sweet romance" but mentioned that while the series brings up issues about gender, it ultimately doesn't do "enough" with them.
