= High&Low The Worst =

- Poster
- Directed by: Shigeaki Kubo
- Screenplay by: Hiroshi Takahashi; Norihisa Hiranuma; Shoichiro Masumoto; Kei Watanabe
- Produced by: Hiroyuki Ueno; Naoto Fujimura; Norihisa Hiranuma; Yosuke Kiguchi
- Cinematography: Koji Matsuura
- Edited by: Tsuyoshi Wada
- Music by: Yuta Nakano; Agung Gede
- Distributed by: Shochiku
- Release date: October 4, 2019
- Running time: 124 minutes
- Country: Japan
- Language: Japanese
- Box office: ¥1.25 billion

High&Low The Worst is a 2019 Japanese action film directed by Shigeaki Kubo. With collaboration with Hiroshi Takahashi's manga Worst, it told the stories of the war between Oya Koukou (Oya High School) from the world of High&Low and Housen Academy from the world of Worst and Crows. It's the sixth film of the High&Low franchise and a spin-off that renews the franchise by adding a dozen new characters to the world of High&Low.

The idea of the High&Low The Worst was first revealed at the end of the previous High&Low film, DTC -Yukemuri Junjou Hen- from High&Low, with a small video clip revealing that there will be a war between Oya High and Housen Academy. It was officially announced on February 19, 2019, with its release day set to be October 4 of the same year. Before the release of the film, a TV series, High&Low The Worst Episode.O, was aired on NTV from July 17, 2019, to introduce the world of High&Low The Worst.

High&Low The Worst 's ensemble cast includes a few members of the Jr. Exile, including Kazuma Kawamura, Hokuto Yoshino, Ryu, Hayato Komori, and Yuta Nakatsuka, while actors like Jun Shison and Yuki Yamada and also joined the cast.

High&Low The Worst premiered in Tokyo on August 19, 2019. It grossed 1.25 billion yen in Japan.

== Plot ==
Yoshiki Murayama has been the leader of Oya High for a while and is now bored without any challengers inside the ferocious school. Like an answer to his boredom, Fujio Hanaoka, a new student transferred to the Full-time School of Oya High, has ambitions to challenge Murayama to a man-to-man fight once he acquires the position of leader of the Full-time School. However, there are many other people at the Full-time School aiming for the same leadership position. They are the top-ranked team of Yosuke Todoroki, Shibaman, and Tsuji; Nakagoshi and Nakaoka, who are leading the second-year and first-year students, respectively; the Yasu-Kiyo faction led by Yasushi and Kiyoshi, who rise to prominence through their crazy fighting style. As the new generation, Fujio, together with his childhood friend Tsukasa and his minion Jamuo, has entered the Warring States period of The Full-time School.

Meanwhile, in the somewhat distant city of Toarushi, the Housen Academy, the strongest skinhead army, led by its leader Sachio Ueda, is gaining strength. The Housen Four Heavenly Kings (commonly known as Ozawa Hitoshi), Odajima, Sawamura, Jinkawa, and Shida, along with the young and resourceful minion Sabakan, has assembled the strongest Housen army ever. One day, Housen's students were suddenly attacked by men who claimed to be students of Oya High, while at the same time, a student from Oya High was also attacked by men who claimed to be Housen's. As a result, the two schools become hostile toward each other.

The two schools, Oya High, being very individualistic but overwhelmingly strong, and Housen Academy, which is organized in a monolithic fashion, clash on the bank of a river at dusk and the summit battle of the century is about to begin. Upon finding out by Murayama and Sabakan that they were being played by a group called Kidra, who are a group of addicts who sell a drug that once circulated in the SWORD district called Red Rum, knowing the truth brings the two schools together to face them.

== Character ==
- Kazuma Kawamura as Fujio Hanaoka, the good looking boy aiming for the top of Oya High. He grew up in Kibogaoka Danchi (a.k.a. Zetsubou Danchi) with Seiji, Shinya, Masaya, Madoka, and Shinta, forming a strong bond with each other. He is small in stature, but boasts outstanding power and speed, and was in charge of all the schools in the area when he was in junior high school. He enrolled in Oya High after graduating from junior high but transferred after two weeks due to his family moved to live with his grandfather. He transferred back to Oya High in senior year, three after his family moved back to town. He has an innocent and curious personality, which enables him to make friends easily with everyone, attracting everyone to gather around him. On the other hand, he also has an appetite to compete with his enemies when he meets them.
- Hokuto Yoshino as Tsukasa Takajo, a childhood friend of Fujio. Growing up in Kibogaoka Danchi and going to the same junior high school as Fujio, he spends most of his time with Fujio as his fighting partner. After Fujio departed Oya High, he lost his enthusiasm and decided to limit himself, and acted cool in the factional warfare of Oya High. He finally decided to do something after a talk with Murayama, and moved by his followers, he went to find Fujio in the village and challenged him to a man-to-man fight, which cleared all his depression. Since he is not good as forming a group, he supported his best friend Fujio to win the title of Oya High after he returned.
- Jun Shison as Sachio Ueda, the leader of killer army of Housen Academy. He may look slender, but with his power, speed, technique, and well-judgment, he is rumored to be the most powerful fighter in the history of Housen. He is a quiet and stoic man with a calm and collected personality, and with his strong sense of responsibility, he repeatedly asks himself if he is really worthy of being at the top. He doesn't like useless disputes, and therefore when one of his men gets into a dispute with another school, he often goes to the other side by himself to settle the situation. On the other hand, he does not hide his anger when his friends are treated unreasonably, and he will do his best to fight against any strong enemy. He lives with his mother and sister, protecting his younger sister Yui instead of their father.
- Yuki Yamada as Yoshiki Murayama, the unshakable leader of Oya Koukou's part-time school. He is slender but tough, and no matter how badly he is beaten, he will resurrect like a zombie. He survived a tradition of taking a rough beating of 100 hits by the delinquents of Oya Koukou's part-time school in the past then beat them all back. As a result, he unified the Oya High for the first time in history, which was once just a collection of delinquents, and pushed it to the top of the SWORD. Through working together with other SWORD gangs, he has grown greatly as an adult. He looks at Todoroki, the head of the Oya High's full-time school, who is strong in fights but doesn't let others get to him, as if he were his old self. He is aloof and self-paced, but he can be harsh with anyone who disturbs the discipline.
- Gōki Maeda as Yosuke Todoroki, the man who used to achieve unification of Oya High's full-time school almost as soon as he entered the school. He may look like an honor student, but in fact, he is a man of extreme physical strength and is practically the number one fighter in the entire Oya High's full-time school. His overly calm personality has made him unable to place himself above others, and as a result, he has caused the balance of the Oya High's full-time school to fall apart.
- Takayuki Suzuki as Hideto Furuya, the second man of Oya Koukou's part-time school. He is much taller than Murayama and holds the record for withstanding up to 98 hits in Oya High's tradition. In Murayama's challenge for the 100 rounds of taking hits for winning the position of leader of Oya Koukou's part-time school, he landed the 100th round. Said hit came after he got upset and hit Murayama with a chair, which was against the rules. However, the undefeatable Murayama still manage to beat him back after succeeding. He was so impressed by Murayama that he become Murayama's right-hand man after that, helping him with his ambitions.
- Wataru Ichinose as Kotaro Seki, a fierce bald man with physique of a professional wrestler. He is currently 25 years old and is the oldest student even in Oya Koukou's part-time school, where many students would intentionally and repeatedly fail exams to avoid graduation from the school. He is so powerful that he can toss opponents high into the air during fights. When he enters combat mode, he strikes a unique pose with his hands folded in front of his chest. He has great respect for the younger leader Murayama. When Murayama struggles after losing many part-time jobs, he introduces Murayama to a job at his father's construction company.
- Kohei Fukuyama as Jamuo. He admires Fujio and Tsukasa deeply, devoting himself to support them. He is a well-informed man, familiar with the information of not only Oya High, but also of the surrounding delinquent high schools and the whole SWORD area.
- Jin Shirasu as Seiji Kirihara, the most brilliant person in the childhood friend group of Kibogaoka Danchi (a.k.a. Zetsubou Danchi). He had been smart since childhood and was accepted to the famous Shutoku High School, where he still managed to become the top of his class. He is, in the words of Fujio, "a star of hope in a hopeless apartment complex". He has a strong sense of justice and loves his friends.
- Yuta Nakatsuka as Shinya Oochi, the oldest of the childhood friend group of Kibogaoka Danchi (a.k.a. Zetsubou Danchi). He is a man with a few words and always acts cool. He and his younger brother, Masaya, made a name for themselves in junior high school as unruly fighting brothers. He currently works for the construction company Sekigumi. His dream is to save up his salary and build a house to live in with his mother, who raised him and Masaya by herself. He has a secret crush on Madoka, who is younger than him but acts like a big sister.
- Hayato Komori as Masaya Oochi, Shinya's younger brother. The two brothers used to have a lot of quarrels, but after Shinya found his goal and started to work diligently, Masaya followed him to Sekigumi. Currently, he is in charge of the worksite. He demands that Murayama of Oya High, who came to Sekigumi as a part-time worker, should speak to him in a completely respectful manner as he is a younger but more senior member of the team. In contrast to Shinya, he is a talkative and cheerful character. He and his brother are saving up to build a house to live in with their mother. He is an old acquaintance of Chiharu of Sannoh Rengokai (Hoodlum Squad), having lived in the same apartment complex for a while.
- Miu Tomita as Madoka Ishii, the only girl in the childhood friend group of Kibogaoka Danchi (a.k.a. Zetsubou Danchi). Her nickname is "Doca". She has loved the feeling of winning since childhood, and she hates any unfair things. She is very strong, and in the event of a fight, she can even easily take down a man. On the advice of her parents, who were concerned about her character, she entered Sekiban Girls' High School, a school for rich young ladies. At school, she hides her true characters and speaks in a refined manner. She can play clarinet and is the captain of the brass band of her school.
- Masato Yano as Arata Maekawa, one of the childhood friend group of Kibogaoka Danchi (a.k.a. Zetsubou Danchi). He has always been shy and gentle. When he was a child, the other five friends were always protecting him. He overthinks things and has an aspect of keeping his problems to himself. His father was an alcoholic and rarely worked, and his mother, who worked part-time, raised him on her own. He dropped out of high school and is now unemployed. There are rumors that he is hanging out with a group of ruffians, which worries his friends.
- Kanta Sato as Tetsu, one of the main members of Sannoh Rengokai, a part of SWORD. His family owns the "Yamanoyu" public bathhouse ion Sannoh shopping street. He formed "DTC" with his friend Dan and Chiharu. The three of them have gone on a trip looking for beautiful girls for a while. He has a thing for sweets.
- Taiki Sato as Chiharu, a member of Sannoh Rengokai. He was a student at Oya High, but on the first day of transferring to this new school, he got into trouble with the students there. He was saved by Yamato from Sannoh Rengokai and joined them after that, with a history of almost causing conflict between the two gangs. There was a period that he lived with Masaya, the younger brother of the Oochi brothers, at the same apartment complex.
- Ryuji Sato portrays Yasushi, and Satoshi Uekiya portrays Kiyoshi, the two leaders of the YasuKiyo gang of Oya High's full-time school's third-year students.
- Fuju Kamio appears as Nakagoshi, and Ken Nakajima appears as Nakaoka. They are the leaders of the Naka-Naka gang, the biggest gang in Oya High's full-time school.
- Ryu and Takahide Suzuki play Todoroki's followers Sibaman and Tsuji, respectively.
- Sho Kiyohara plays Nakabayashi, Ken Aoki plays Nakakuki, Sho Jinnai plays Nakazono. Usually called the Sannaka Trio, they are the guys who represent the next generation of Oya High's full-time school.
- Akihisa Shiono, Yo Aoi, Shin Koyanagi, and Atsushi Arai portray the Four Heavenly Kings (commonly known as Ozawa Hitoshi) of the Housen Academy, Yuken Odajima, Shojii Sawamura, Eimei Jinkawa, and Kenzo Shida, respectively.
- Ryotaro Sakaguchi appears as Sabakan, a first-year student of Housen.
- Hitoshi Ozawa plays Masatora Seki, father of Oya Koukou's part-time school's Kotaro Seki and the boss of construction company Sekigumi, where Murayama and the Oochi Brothers work.
- Takashi Tsukamoto portrays Parko, who has become rich and entrusts Sekigumi to build his dream Yakitori restaurant.
- Yumena Yanai appears as Yui Ueda, Sachio Ueda's sister. She is also a member of Seibang Girls' High School's brass band.

== Production ==
High&Low The Worst is the sixth installment in the High&Low film series and is a collaboration with manga artist Hiroshi Takahashi 's manga of Crows and Worst, linking the world of High&Low with the world of Crows and Worst.

Hiroshi Takahashi designed and drew the illustrations of the new-generation Housen Academy characters for the film, as well as promotional visuals that contain both new Housen characters and Housen Academy characters who appeared in Crows and Worst.

== Marketing ==
The idea of the High&Low The Worst was first revealed at the end of the previous High&Low film, DTC -Yukemuri Junjou Hen- from High&Low, with a small video clip revealing that there will be a war between Oya High and the Housen Academy. On February 19, 2019, High&Low The Worst was officially announced during the live concert of The Rampage from Exile Tribe, with its release day set to be October 4 of the same year and the introduction of actors who will portray characters of Oya High. On March 20, the actors for students of the Housen Academy were announced as the film released its first trailer and one of its soundtrack. On June 5, a TV drama, The Worst Episode. O was announced, which is produced to introduce the world of the film. After its first poster released on June 13, another two soundtracks were released along with the announcement of actors for the people living in Kibogaoka Danchi (a.k.a. Zetsubou Danchi). On July 26, an exhibition of the film's original scenes was set up at the Shiodome public underground walkway in Tokyo, Japan. The official trailer and poster of the film were released on August 1, while a special version of trailer and poster that focus on Kibogaoka Danchi (a.k.a. Zetsubou Danchi) was released on August 17. On August 19, a red carpet with the main cast was held in Tokyo. On August 16, another special version of trailer and poster that focus on the Housen Academy was released. On September 17 and 18, High&Low THE WORST VS THE RAMPAGE from EXILE TRIBE Premiere Screening Event & Premium Live Show was held in Makuhari Messe.

== Reception ==
=== Box office ===
High&Low The Worst grossed more than 310 million yen in its opening weekend, and placed third at the Japanese box office. The film grossed 1.25 billion yen in total.

=== Critical response ===
Japanese film critic Kentaro Muramatsu described the film as "imaginative and action-packed film", writing that "In contrast to the hard-grounded action in the confrontation between Oya High and the Housen Academy, the clash with the Oya High and the Housen Academy. vs. the drug gangs has some three-dimensional action that incorporates vertical movement set in Kibogaoka Danchi (a.k.a. Zetsubou Danchi), and you can feel the atmosphere of the film changing completely from an action perspective." He also pointed out that the film is also "a very skillful film", "cleverly blending the world of High&Low and that of Hiroshi Takahashi's manga Worst as well as Crows into one. Besides, he praised the acting, commenting that "with actors like Haruma Miura and Go Ayano already portraying students of the Housen Academy in Crows Zero 2, they have left a strong image for the audiences and set a very high bar for future characters from the Housen Academy, but these actors playing the students of the Housen Academy in High&Low The Worst still well worth the praise!"
