= Kanta Sato =

Japanese actor (born 1996)

- 佐藤寛太
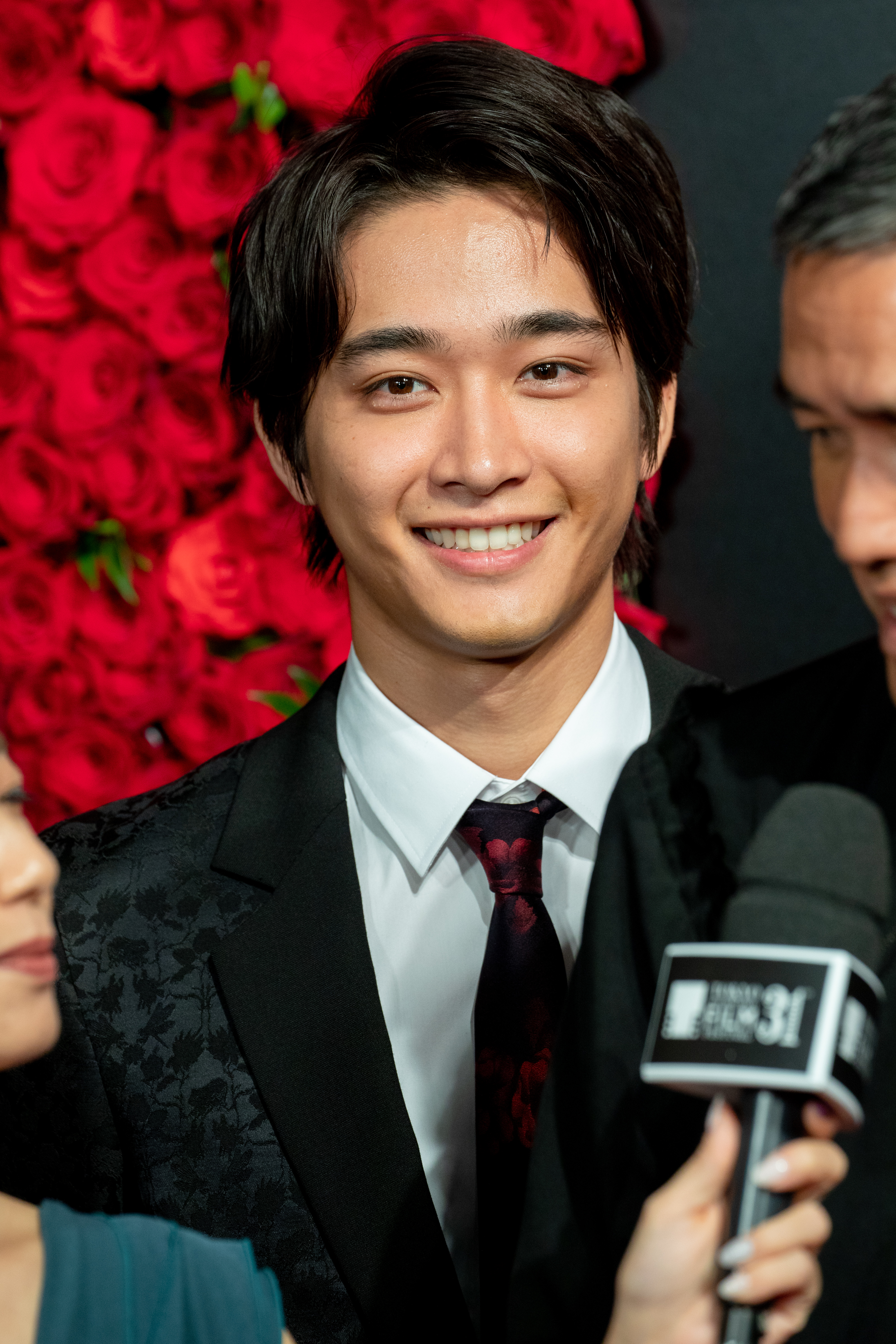
- Sato at the opening ceremony of The 31st Tokyo International Film Festival, 2018.
- Born: 16 June 1996 (age 29); Fukuoka Prefecture, Japan
- Occupation: Actor
- Years active: 2015–present
- Agent: LDH
- Website: Sato_k

Kanta Sato (佐藤 寛太, Satō Kanta; born 16 June 1996) is a Japanese actor, he is a member of EXILE's theater company (Gekidan EXILE). He is best known for his role as Naoki Irie in the 2016 film Itazura no Kiss the Movie: High School.

Sato is represented with LDH.

== Early life ==
Kanta Sato was born on June 16, 1996, in Tsushima (Fukuoka Prefecture), Japan, where he lived until the age of 7. He has two brothers and used to play baseball from his first year in elementary school to the 3rd year of Junior high school. The Rampage from Exile Tribe's Shogo Iwaya and Hokuto Yoshino were his classmates in high school.

== Career ==
Sato aimed for the entertainment industry after watching the movie Extremely Loud & Incredibly Close when he was in Junior high school.

In 2013, he participated in the EXPG National Academy Audition in the model department of the Fukuoka branch and passed, which led him to learn dancing. In the same year, he participated in the Exile vocal audition Vocal Battle Audition 4 but failed during the first screening.

In 2014, he participated in Exile Performer Battle Audition and made it to the second screening but ultimately did not pass. In the same year, he became a trainee of Exile's theater company after passing the "Gekidan Exile audition".

In January 2015, Sato officially joined Gekidan Exile and started his activities as an actor. He made his acting debut in the drama High & Low The Story Of S.W.O.R.D.

In 2016, he played his first lead role in the film Itazura no Kiss the Movie: High School.

On 16 June 2021, he released his first personal book titled "Next Break", with one of the four photographers involved being his actor friend Takumi Kitamura.

== Filmography ==
=== Movies ===
| Year | Title | Role | Notes | Ref. |
|---|---|---|---|---|
| 2016 | Itazura no Kiss the Movie: High School | Naoki Irie | Lead role | |
| 2016 | Road To High & Low | Tettsu | | |
| 2016 | High & Low: The Movie | Tettsu | | |
| 2016 | High&Low The Red Rain | Tettsu | | |
| 2017 | Itazura na Kiss The Movie 2: Campus | Naoki Irie | Lead role | |
| 2017 | Itazura na Kiss The Movie 3: Propose | Naoki Irie | Lead role | |
| 2017 | High&Low The Movie 2 / End of Sky | Tettsu | | |
| 2017 | High&Low The Movie 3 / Final Mission | Tettsu | | |
| 2017 | Love and Lies | Sosuke Takachiho | | |
| 2018 | Missions of Love | Akira Shimotsuki | | |
| 2018 | Ao-Natsu | Izumiya Liquor Store Visitor | | |
| 2018 | DTC: Yukemuri Junjo Hen from High & Low | Tettsu | | |
| 2018 | Run! T High School Basketball Club | Koji Makizono | | |
| 2018 | Jam | Maejima | | |
| 2018 | Family Story | Yudai Watanabe | | |
| 2019 | High&Low The Worst | Tettsu | | |
| 2019 | Bento Harassment | Tatsuo Yamashita | | |
| 2019 | The Sketch of Life | Ryota Tanaka | Lead role | |
| 2021 | We Made a Beautiful Bouquet | Shoma Tominokoji | | |
| 2021 | Gunkan Shōnen | Kaisei Sakamoto | Lead role | |
| 2023 | (Ab)normal Desire | Daiya Morohashi | | |
| 2024 | Undead Lovers | Jun Kōno | | |
| 2025 | Meets the World | | | |

=== TV dramas ===
| Year | Title | Role | Notes | Ref. |
|---|---|---|---|---|
| 2018 | The Detective is Way Ahead | Tsubasa Jonouchi | | |
| 2019 | Sweet Tai Chi | Shun Tsukiyama | Chinese internet drama | |
| 2019 | Butler Saionji's Great Reasoning season 2 | Ren Narahashi | Episode 6 | |
| 2019 | Da rapper bites and becomes a rapper | Takuma Yamanouchi | Special drama | |
| 2020 | Chuzai Keiji Season 2 | Shohei Karube | | |
| 2020 | Tonari no Masala | Tatsuya Sawaki | Lead role | |
| 2020 | Gourmet Detective Goro Akechi | Tatsuomi Takahashi | | |
| 2020 | Hakujitsu no Karasu 2 | Kohei Tachibana | Special drama | |
| 2021 | Himitsu no Ai-chan | Reo Amano | Lead role | |
| 2021 | JAM -the drama- | Leslie Cheung Cheung | | |
| 2021 | Chef wa Meitantei | Daisuke Ogura | | |
| 2021 | Tokyo MER: Mobile Emergency Room | Haruto Fukasawa | | |
| 2022 | Chuzai Keiji Season 3 | Shohei Karube | | |
| 2022 | Sweat and Soap | Kotaro Natori | | |
| 2024 | Chaser Game W | Aoyama Wataru | | |
| 2025 | In Lilac Bloom, The Path to a Veterinarian | Kazuma Kase | Miniseries | |

=== TV shows ===
| Date | Title | Notes | Ref. |
|---|---|---|---|
| 2019 | Oyasumi Ouji | | |

=== Radio drama ===
| Date | Title | Role | Ref. |
|---|---|---|---|
| 2016 | Saturday Drama house "Beautiful Boy's Theater" Story No. 16 "Hajikeru otoko" | Shimotsuki/ a clerk of a video shop /a guest of a movie theater | |
| 2016 | Saturday Drama House "Beautiful Boy's Theater" Story No. 19 "Dancing in the Nursery" | Todo Naoyuki, Sakurai Yui | |

== Bibliography ==
=== Personal Book ===
| Year | Title | Ref. |
|---|---|---|
| 2021 | NEXT BREAK | |
