= Ryuchell =

Japanese model (1995–2023)

- りゅうちぇる
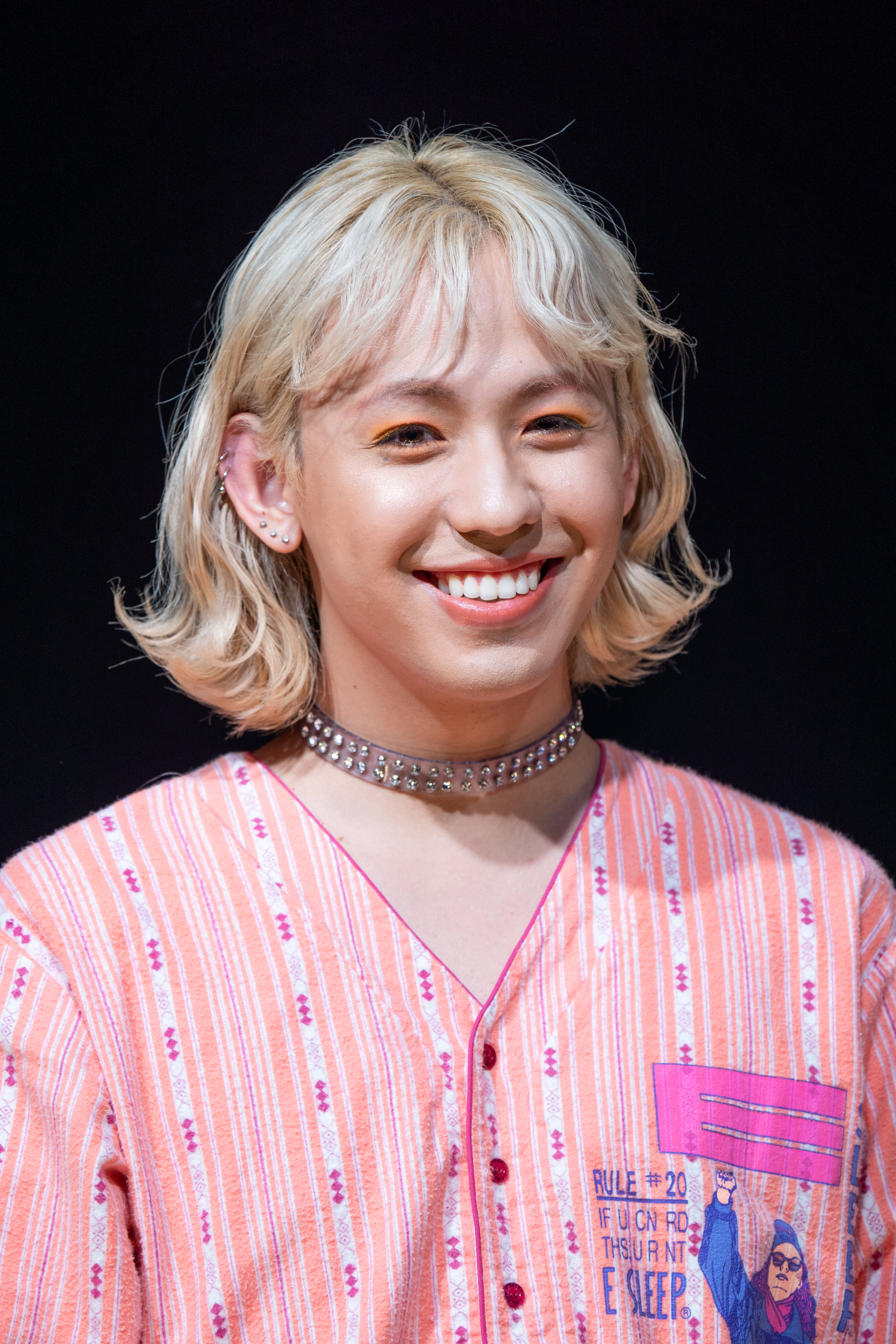
- Ryuchell in 2019
- Born: Ryūji Higa; September 29, 1995; Ginowan, Okinawa Prefecture, Japan
- Died: July 12, 2023 (aged 27); Shibuya, Tokyo, Japan
- Other name: Ryuchell
- Education: Okinawa Prefectural Ginowan Junior High School; Kitanakagusuku High School
- Occupation: Model
- Agent: Starray Production
- Height: 172 cm (5 ft 8 in)
- Spouse: Peco (m. 2016; div. 2022)
- Children: 1

Ryūji Higa (比嘉 龍二, Higa Ryūji; 29 September 1995 – 12 July 2023), known professionally as Ryuchell (りゅうちぇる, Ryūcheru), was a Japanese social media personality, model, singer, and activist. In the mid-2010s, Ryuchell gained a social media following through modeling in Harajuku and later became an influential figure in the Japanese genderless fashion subculture. In 2018, Ryuchell also debuted as a singer with their first song, "Hands Up!! If You're Awesome."

In 2022, Ryuchell began advocating for LGBT rights on Japanese television. This, compounded with Ryuchell's announcement that they no longer identified under male gender roles and had divorced, opened them up to scrutiny.

== Early life ==
Ryuchell was born in Ginowan, Okinawa, on 29 September 1995. Ryuchell's older sister was the singer Chiharu Higa. Ryuchell also attended the same high school as JO1 member Sho Yonashiro, as well as The Rampage from Exile Tribe members Kenta Kamiya and Rui Yonamine.

== Career ==
After graduating from high school, Ryuchell moved to Tokyo and began working in clothing stores in Harajuku while modeling at the same time. On 14 February 2018, Ryuchell debuted as a singer with their first song, "Hands Up!! If You're Awesome." For the music video, they worked with make-up brand NYX Professional Makeup. On 15 August 2018, they released their second song, "Link", dedicated to their son.

After a four-year absence in music, on 11 January 2023, Ryuchell released their second album, Time Machine, independently. Ryuchell described the album's lead track, "Never Say Never Again", as "melancholy melodies" from the 1980s and 1990s. The music video was also filmed with the image of a "cute rock band from the late 80s." Ryuchell also embarked on a tour from February to March 2023 in Tokyo to promote the album.

== Public image ==
Ryuchell originally spelled their stage name in hiragana, but began using the romanized version in 2018 after debuting as a singer. Ryuchell was one of the key influential figures for the genderless fashion subculture in Japan, due to their penchant for androgynous and colorful clothing. Ryuchell's fashion was heavily influenced by fashion from the United States in the 1980s and 1990s.

Ryuchell eventually became a prominent LGBT figure in mainstream Japanese media, making regular appearances on variety shows and at LGBT-themed events in Japan. As their popularity grew, they were also subjected to numerous harassment campaigns on Japanese social media, which primarily criticized Ryuchell's divorce and gender nonconformity.

== Personal life ==
On 31 December 2016, Ryuchell married model and fellow Japanese social media personality Peco. In July 2018, they announced the birth of their son, named Link after Link Larkin from Hairspray.

On 25 August 2022, Ryuchell announced through Instagram that they no longer identified with male gender roles regarding their marriage, and that they would rather be considered as a "life partner" and "parent" to Peco and their son instead. Ryuchell and Peco's agencies confirmed that the two divorced, but initially denied the couple was living separately. In the months following the divorce, they made numerous appearances on Japanese talk shows advocating for LGBT rights in Japan.

Ryuchell participated in Tokyo Rainbow Pride since 2018.

== Death ==
On 12 July 2023, Ryuchell was found unconscious by their manager in a talent agency office located in the Sasazuka neighborhood of Shibuya. They were pronounced dead shortly afterward, at age 27. According to the Tokyo Metropolitan Police, the cause of death was believed to have been suicide.

== Filmography ==
=== Film ===
Year	Title	Role	Notes
2019	Crayon Shin-chan: Honeymoon Hurricane ~The Lost Hiroshi~	Themself	voice
2022	Safe Word	Tsubaki	

=== TV series ===
Title	Network	Notes
Peke Pon	Fuji TV	Quasi-regular appearances
Yasashī Hitonara Tokeru Quiz Yasashī ne	Fuji TV	Quasi-regular appearances

=== Stage ===
Year	Title	Notes
2015	Arikanashika	

== Discography ==
=== Albums ===
Title	Details	Peak	Sales
Title	Details	JPN	Sales
Super Candy Boy	Released: April 10, 2019; Label: Universal Music; Format: CD, digital download; Track listing: 1. Super Candy Boy; 2. Hands Up!! If You're Awesome; 3. Ima Sugu Kiss Me; 4. Link; 5. Diversity Guys; 6. Beautiful Dreamer; 7. You Are My Love	45	JPN: 1,146
Time Machine (♡T愛me Ma心n♡)	Released: January 11, 2023; Label: TuneCore; Format: digital download	—N/a	—N/a
