= Switch (2018 manga) =

Japanese manga series by Atsushi Namikiri

- Cover of the first volume
- Genre: Sports
- Manga
- Written by: Atsushi Namikiri
- Published by: Shogakukan
- Imprint: Shōnen Sunday Comics
- Magazine: Weekly Shōnen Sunday
- Original run: April 11, 2018 – May 12, 2021
- Volumes: 15

Switch (stylized as switch) is a Japanese basketball-themed manga series written and illustrated by Atsushi Namikiri. It was serialized in Shogakukan's Weekly Shōnen Sunday from April 2018 to May 2021, with its chapters collected in fifteen tankōbon volumes.

== Publication ==
Switch, written and illustrated by Atsushi Namikiri, was serialized in Shogakukan's Weekly Shōnen Sunday from April 11, 2018, to May 12, 2021. Shogakukan collected its chapters in fifteen tankōbon volumes, released from November 16, 2018, to July 16, 2021.

=== Volumes ===
| No. | Japanese release date | Japanese ISBN |
|---|---|---|
| 1 | November 16, 2018 | 978-4-09-128400-6 |
| 2 | November 16, 2018 | 978-4-09-128569-0 |
| 3 | January 18, 2019 | 978-4-09-128775-5 |
| 4 | January 18, 2019 | 978-4-09-129129-5 |
| 5 | July 18, 2019 | 978-4-09-129298-8 |
| 6 | October 18, 2019 | 978-4-09-129430-2 |
| 7 | January 17, 2020 | 978-4-09-129543-9 |
| 8 | April 16, 2020 | 978-4-09-850063-5 |
| 9 | July 17, 2020 | 978-4-09-850159-5 |
| 10 | October 16, 2020 | 978-4-09-850267-7 |
| 11 | January 18, 2021 | 978-4-09-850382-7 |
| 12 | April 16, 2021 | 978-4-09-850520-3 |
| 13 | July 16, 2021 | 978-4-09-850636-1 |
| 14 | July 16, 2021 | 978-4-09-850637-8 |
| 15 | July 16, 2021 | 978-4-09-850638-5 |

== Reception ==
Switch was one of the Top 3 Sports Manga Series of the "Nationwide Bookstore Employees' Recommended Comics of 2020" by Honya Club.

== See also ==
- Red Blue, another manga series by the same author
