= Kazuma Kawamura =

Japanese singer, dancer and actor (born 1997)

- 川村 壱馬
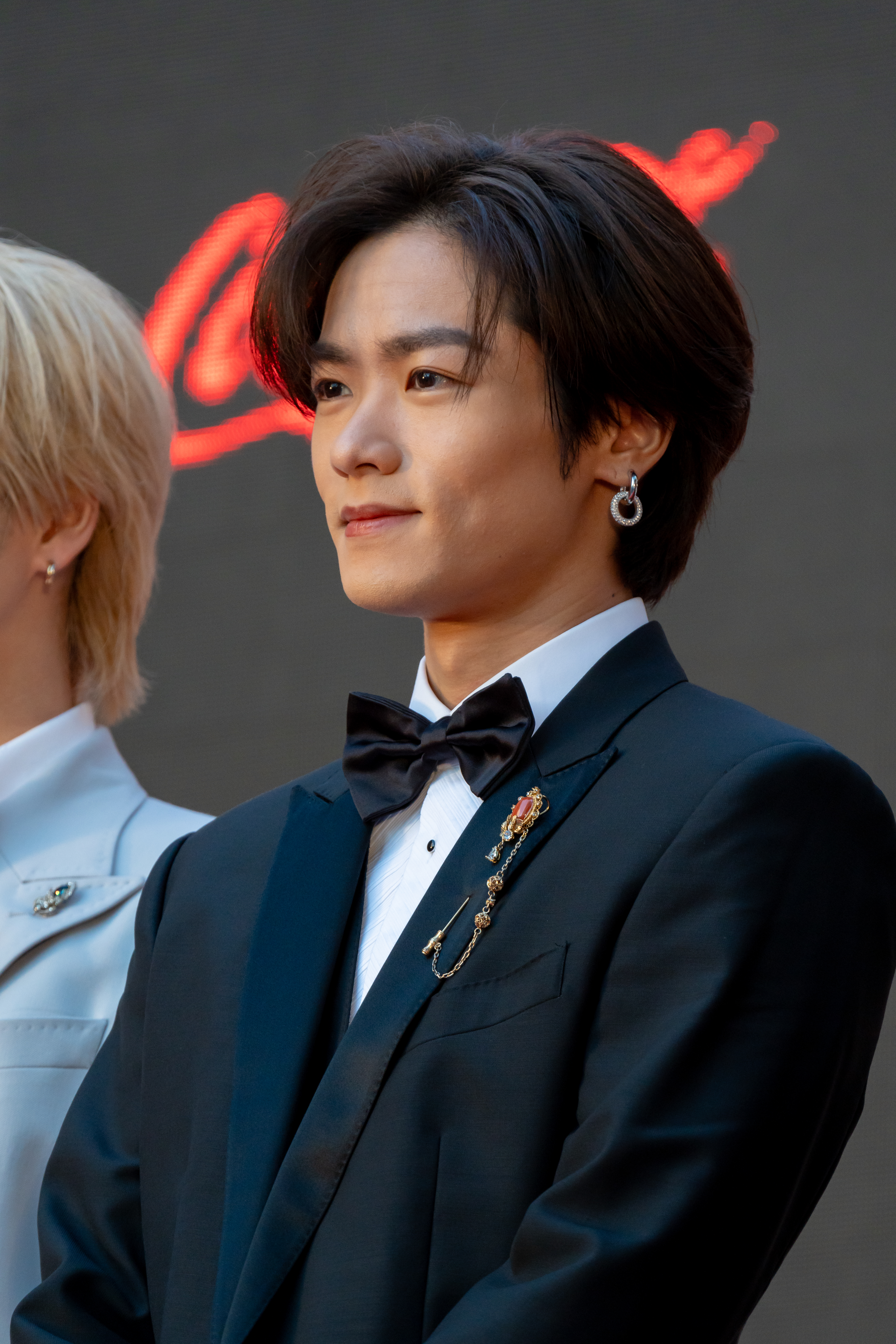
- Kawamura at the Tokyo International Film Festival in October 2023
- Born: 7 January 1997 (age 29); Osaka Prefecture, Japan
- Other name: L.E.I.
- Occupations: Singer; rapper; dancer; actor
- Years active: 2014–present
- Agent: LDH
- Musical career
- Genres: J-pop; Dance
- Instrument: Vocals
- Labels: Rhythm Zone; MoooD Records
- Website: www.ldh.co.jp

Kazuma Kawamura (川村 壱馬, Kawamura Kazuma; born 7 January 1997) is a Japanese singer, dancer and actor. He is a member of the J-Pop group The Rampage from Exile Tribe and represented with LDH. On January 29, 2025, he made his solo debut under the stage name L.E.I.

== Early life ==
Kazuma Kawamura was born on January 7, 1997, in Osaka, Japan. Since his childhood he had dreamed of appearing on television. Initially, Kawamura wanted to become an actor but after a close friend of his lent him an Exile album during his third grade of junior high school, he was so impressed by the group, especially their vocalist Takahiro, that he changed his goals. Ever since, he aspired to become a professional singer. With the support of his parents and the ambition to learn how to sing, he transferred from a normal high school to a music school later on. He was then scouted by EXPG Osaka during an LDH seminar and became a scholarship student there.

== Career ==
Inspired by Exile and convinced LDH was the only way to achieve his dream of becoming a singer, Kawamura took part in the VOCAL BATTLE AUDITION 4 - For Young People with Dreams in April 2014 as his first audition. Ultimately, he passed the audition as one of three winners out of 30 thousand contestants alongside Hokuto Yoshino and Riku Aoyama and became a vocal candidate for THE RAMPAGE. In September of the same year, he was chosen as an official member of the group.

In January 2017, The Rampage from Exile Tribe made their debut with the single "Lightning".

In October 2018, he made his acting debut in the TV drama Prince of Legend, playing the role "Team Kyogoku Brothers'" prince Ryu Kyogoku. On February 14, 2019, he attended the PRINCE OF LEGEND PREMIUM LIVE SHOW, a fan-meeting with the whole Prince of Legend cast, at Yokohama Arena. There, he performed "Take on Me", a cover of A-ha's 80s hit and insert song of the show, alongside Nobuyuki Suzuki who played the other Kyogoku brother. On September 7 in the same year, Kawamura was invited to the 29th Tokyo Girls Collection (Autumn/Winter) at Saitama Super Arena together with the main cast of the movie High & Low The Worst in which he stars as Fujio Hanaoka. This marked the first time he attended any fashion related event and walked a runway in his career. A few months after, he also appeared at the 30th Tokyo Girls Collection (Spring/Summer) alongside the main cast of the movie Kizoku Tanjou -Prince Of Legend-.

On June 23, 2020, his first photo essay titled SINCERE will be released.

== Personal life ==
Kawamura practiced Karate for 11 years starting in his first year of elementary school.

He is one of the members of a Krump dance crew "Rag Pound" with fellow members Kaisei Takechi and Makoto Hasegawa.

== Works ==
=== Participating works ===
Year	Title	Artist	Ref.
2018	"Take on Me"	m-flo presents PRINCE PROJECT feat. Kawamura Kazuma	

=== Lyrics ===
Year	Title	Artist	Notes	ref.
2017	100 Degrees	The Rampage from Exile Tribe	Rap part	
2018	Dream On	The Rampage from Exile Tribe	Rap part	
2022	STRAIGHT UP	The Rampage from Exile Tribe		
2020	FAST LANE	The Rampage from Exile Tribe		
2024	GO HARD	MA55IVE THE RAMPAGE		
2024	SURVIVE	MA55IVE THE RAMPAGE		
2025	Enter	L.E.I.		
2025	Delete	L.E.I.		

== Filmography ==
=== TV Dramas ===
Year	Title	Role	Neotes	Ref.
2018	Prince of Legend	Ryu Kyogoku		
2019	High & Low The Worst Episode.0	Fujio Hanaoka	Lead role	
2019	Kizoku Tanjou -Prince of Legend-	Ryu Kyogoku		
2023	Sexy Tanaka-san	Kōsuke Shōno		

=== Films ===
Year	Title	Role	Neotes	Ref.
2019	Prince of Legend	Ryu Kyogoku		
2019	High&Low The Worst	Fujio Hanaoka		
2020	Kizoku Kourin: Prince Of Legend	Ryu Kyogoku		
2022	High&Low The Worst X	Fujio Hanaoka	Lead role	
2022	Sadako DX	Oji Maeda		
2023	My (K)night	Setsuna		
2027	High&Low: The New World			

=== Game ===
Year	Title	Role	Notes
2019	Prince Of Legend Love Royale	Ryu Kyogoku	Released on March 25 Available on iOS / Android

== Bibliography ==
=== Photo essay ===
Release date	Title	Ref
June 23, 2020	SINCERE	

=== Photo book ===
Release date	Title	Ref
April 24, 2024	Étoile	
