= Peco (model) =

Japanese fashion model

- ぺこ
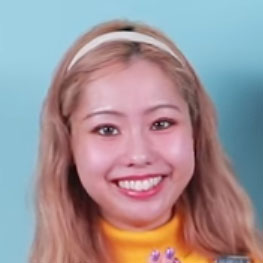
- Peco in 2017
- Born: Tetsuko Okuhira (奥平哲子); 30 June 1995 (age 31); Sakai, Osaka Prefecture, Japan
- Other names: Peco; Peco-chan (ぺこちゃん, Peko-chan); Teco (てこ, Teko); Pecorin (ぺこりん, Pekorin)
- Occupations: Model; television personality; singer
- Agent: Starray Production
- Height: 1.58 m (5 ft 2 in)
- Spouse: Ryuchell (m. 2016; div. 2022)
- Children: 1

Tetsuko Okuhira (奥平哲子, Okuhira Tetsuko; born 30 June 1995) known professionally as Peco (ぺこ, Peko), is a Japanese model, television personality, and singer. She is represented by Starray Production. She was once a member of Yoshimoto Creative Agency in Osaka.

== Early life ==
Peco was born in Osaka Prefecture in 1995. She grew up in a wealthy family who runs a company of construction materials. In seventh grade, Peco entered the New Star Creation (NSC) Josei Tarento Course, where she participated in activities with Yoshimoto. After graduating from high school in Tokyo, she began part-time work at an apparel shop in Harajuku, and later joined Starray Production.

== Career ==
- In July 2010, Peco was elected as one of the PR Girls in Welcome TV's "Glico Giant Caprico PR Girls Audition".
- In April 2011, she enrolled to NSC Josei Tarento Course.
- In April 2012, Peco joined the Yoshimoto girl unit Tsubomi. When she joined Yoshimoto's Tsubomi she was active in the comic combination "Sakuranbo". They had an experience of entering the second preliminaries of the MBS Manzai Awards in 2012.
- After graduating from Tsubomi Peco turned into a reader model, and renamed to her current stage name and appeared in Zipper and HR. She also served as an image girl in Tenshi no Tsubasa.
- On 17 September 2014 Peco's started her music career with the single "Peco Ondo" in the name peco.
- In September 2015, in the variety show Onna no Karada Atari Search Bangumi: Naze? Soko? she was introduced as Charisma Model Shitennō along with Nicole Fujita, Miyu Ikeda and Chisato Yoshiki. Later in the same month, Peco appeared in Gyōretsu no Dekiru Hōritsusōdansho alongside Ryuchell, and since then, they appeared together in various variety shows.
- On 31 December 2016, she announced her marriage to the late Ryuchell (1995–2023).

In July 2018, they announced the birth of their son, named Link after Link Larkin from Hairspray. On 25 August 2022, they announced on Instagram that they were legally separating after discussions over Ryuchell's gender roles. Their agencies confirmed that the two had divorced while also continuing to live together.

== Discography ==
=== Singles ===
Year	Title
2014	"Peco Ondo"

== Filmography ==
=== Film ===
Year	Title	Role	Notes
2019	Crayon Shin-chan: Honeymoon Hurricane ~The Lost Hiroshi~	Herself	voice

=== TV programmes ===
Title	Network	Notes
Peke×Pon	Fuji TV	Quasi-regular
Yasashī Hitonara Tokeru: Quiz yasashī ne	Fuji TV	Quasi-regular since 2016
Gyōretsu no Dekiru Hōritsusōdansho	NTV	Occasional appearances
Tensai! Shimura Dōbutsuen	NTV	Quasi-regular

=== Magazines ===
Title
Zipper
HG
Popteen

=== Stage ===
Year	Title
2014	Troy Melay ni sayonara

=== Animation ===
Year	Title	Ref.
2016	Tohyo-to	
