= X-gender =

Japanese term for non-binary gender identities

X-gender (Japanese: Xジェンダー, romanized: x-jendā) is a third-gender that differs from M, for male, or F, for female. The term X-gender came into use during the later 1990s, popularized by queer organizations in Kansai, especially in Osaka and Kyoto. The term is used alongside non-binary (ノンバイナリー) and genderqueer (ジェンダー・クィア) in Japan.

Prominent examples of people who define themselves as "X-gender" are mangaka Yūki Kamatani and Yuu Watase.

In 2019, Japan LGBT Research Institute Inc. conducted an online survey, collecting 348,000 valid responses from people aged 20 to 69, not all of whom were LGBT. 2.5% of the respondents called themselves X-gender.

== Word origin ==
The Japanese term X-gender is made up of an X indicating indeterminacy and the loan word gender, which is borrowed from English but may have somewhat different connotations from the English term. The international terms "transgender", "genderqueer" or "non-binary" or their Japanese-language equivalents were historically never used for such gender identities in Japan.

The Kansai region on the Japanese main island is assumed to be the origin of the expression, where it appeared again and again in publications by queer (homosexual) groups in the course of the 1990s, although the exact origin is unknown. The meaning is first considered and defined in detail in an issue of Poco a poco magazine, published by G-Front Kansai in 2000, which contained several articles about people who would be classified as X-gender. However, the term itself only appeared in the glossary. Through one of the founding members of the group, who participated in several interviews and documentaries, x-jendā (pronounced ekkusu jendā in Japanese) further established. As a result, the term became more widespread through use in social media and increased awareness of the gender discourse in public opinion.

== Classification ==
X-gender is considered part of the transgender spectrum and is often considered a gender identity disorder (Japanese: 性同一性障害, romanized: seidōitsuseishōgai). Since "X-gender" encompasses a wide variety of gender identities, there is no clear definition of this category in terms of a specific gender; three subgroups are used by some queer groups but do not have the same mainstream reach:

- ryōsei (両性): Individuals with characteristics of both sexes (bigender/androgyne);
- chūsei (中性): Persons with a gender identity beyond male or female (third gender/gender neutral);
- musei (無性): People who do not have clear sex characteristics (intersex) or do not want to be tied to one of the two gender roles (agender).

The word component -sei (性) used in all of these designations means "gender" and refers to both biological and identity characteristics.

In addition there is a fourth subgroup:

- Futei-sei (不定性): Gender identity of a person whose gender identity fluctuates between two specific genders (genderfluid)

There are multiple explanations for gender identity that can be summarized as X gender, including but not limited to the above, and variations of neutrality such as "male-leaning neutrality," neutrality with gender identity other than gender binary, and examples of both genders but feeling superior to one gender or the other. So even if the term is the same on the surface, there is a range in perception by the parties involved.

The meanings of "transgender" and "gender identity disorder" originally referred to the change between the two sexes, from one to the other entirely (transsexuality). Part of the idea was also that there was only this dual gender, combined with a heteronormativity of the respective sexual orientation (opposite sex love). In contrast, Japanese X-gender offers an indefinite possibility of gender assignment outside of the two categories without questioning their binary or heteronormativity.

- People born intersex are described as XtX, and sometimes XtM and XtF, depending the gender identity
- People born female are described as FtX analogous to FtM transgender people
- People born male are described as MtX analogous to MtF transgender people

== See also ==
- Genderless fashion in Japan
