= Don't Stop My Beautification =

Japanese manga series

- Cover art from the web serialization, depicting Haruomi Saito

俺の美女化が止まらない!? (Ore no Bijoka ga Tomaranai!?)
- Manga
- Written by: Mana Aizen
- Published by: Ohzora Publishing
- Imprint: Astro Comics
- Magazine: Comic Wacha
- Original run: April 30, 2021 – present
- Volumes: 2
- Television drama
- Directed by: Izuru Kumasaka; Ikuko Sawada; Kozue Sasaki; Yuya Nakaizumi
- Produced by: Yukitoshi Komatsu; Kozue Sasaki; Yuji Hiratai
- Written by: Yosuke Masaike; Ayumi Shimo; Ikuko Sawada
- Studio: PROTX, Studio Blue
- Original network: Paravi, TV Tokyo
- Original run: February 1, 2023 – February 22, 2023
- Episodes: 8

Don't Stop My Beautification (Note: Released in Japanese as Ore no Bijoka ga Tomaranai!? (俺の美女化が止まらない!?; "My Transformation Into a Beautiful Woman Does Not Stop!?") and abbreviated Ore Bijo (オレ美女)) is a josei manga series written and illustrated by Mana Aizen, serialized since April 30, 2021, through Ohzora Publishing's digital platform Comic Wacha. A live-action television series adaptation by PROTX and Studio Blue was released in February 2023, with Raiku in the lead role.

The series follows Haruomi Saito, a young man who moves into a boarding house in Tokyo where, in exchange for low rent, he has to work at the cross-dressing café and bar Spica Doll along with the other residents, which has a positive effect on him. The manga was well received by readers.

== Premise ==
The university student Haruomi Saito has a medical condition causing him to blush when talking to women, which hinders him socially and has been a source of trauma for a decade. When moving into a boarding house in Tokyo with unusually low rent, he meets Kokono. At first he thinks Kokono is a woman, but he turns out to be a man working at the cross-dressing café and bar Spica Doll, which operates from the boarding house. Haruomi had been unaware of Spica Doll, and learns that he as a resident at the boarding house is obligated to work there. Dressing like a woman ends up having a positive effect on Haruomi, becoming a source of personal growth and self-affirmation.

=== Characters ===
- Haruomi Saito (斉藤晴臣, Saito Haruomi) is a university student moving into the boarding house, where he has to work at the cross-dressing café and bar Spica Doll under the name "Haru" (ハル). He is played by Raiku in the television drama.
- Kokono (恋々乃), real name Kyōhei Kui (九井恭平, Kui Kyōhei), is a Spica Doll staff member who teaches Haruomi about cross-dressing. He is played by Shogo Sakamoto in the television drama.
- Juka (ジュカ) is a make-up artist working at Spica Doll. He is played by Keisuke Kida in the television drama.
- Unipyo (うにぴょ) is an influencer working at Spica Doll, who teaches Haruomi how to act. He is played by Toman in the television drama.
- Momoe (百恵) is the owner of Spica Doll and the manager of the lodging house. He is played by Tomomi Maruyama in the television drama.
- Maimi Haraguchi (原口苺美, Haraguchi Maimi) is a classmate of Haruomi's, whom he falls in love with. She is played by Riho Sayashi in the television drama.

== Production and release ==
Don't Stop My Beautification is written and drawn by Mana Aizen, and was initially published by Ohzora Publishing through their digital platform Comic Wacha from April 30, 2021, to May 6, 2022; serialization resumed on January 20, 2023. Ohzora Publishing is also releasing the series in collected volumes, with a first digital release on February 10, 2023, followed by a print release on April 10.

=== Volumes ===
No.	Release date	ISBN
1	February 10, 2023 (digital); April 10, 2023 (print)	978-4776754305
Level 1–6; "Omake" (おまけ; "Bonus")
2	May 10, 2023	978-4776754336
Level 7–12; "Omake" (おまけ; "Bonus")

== Television drama ==
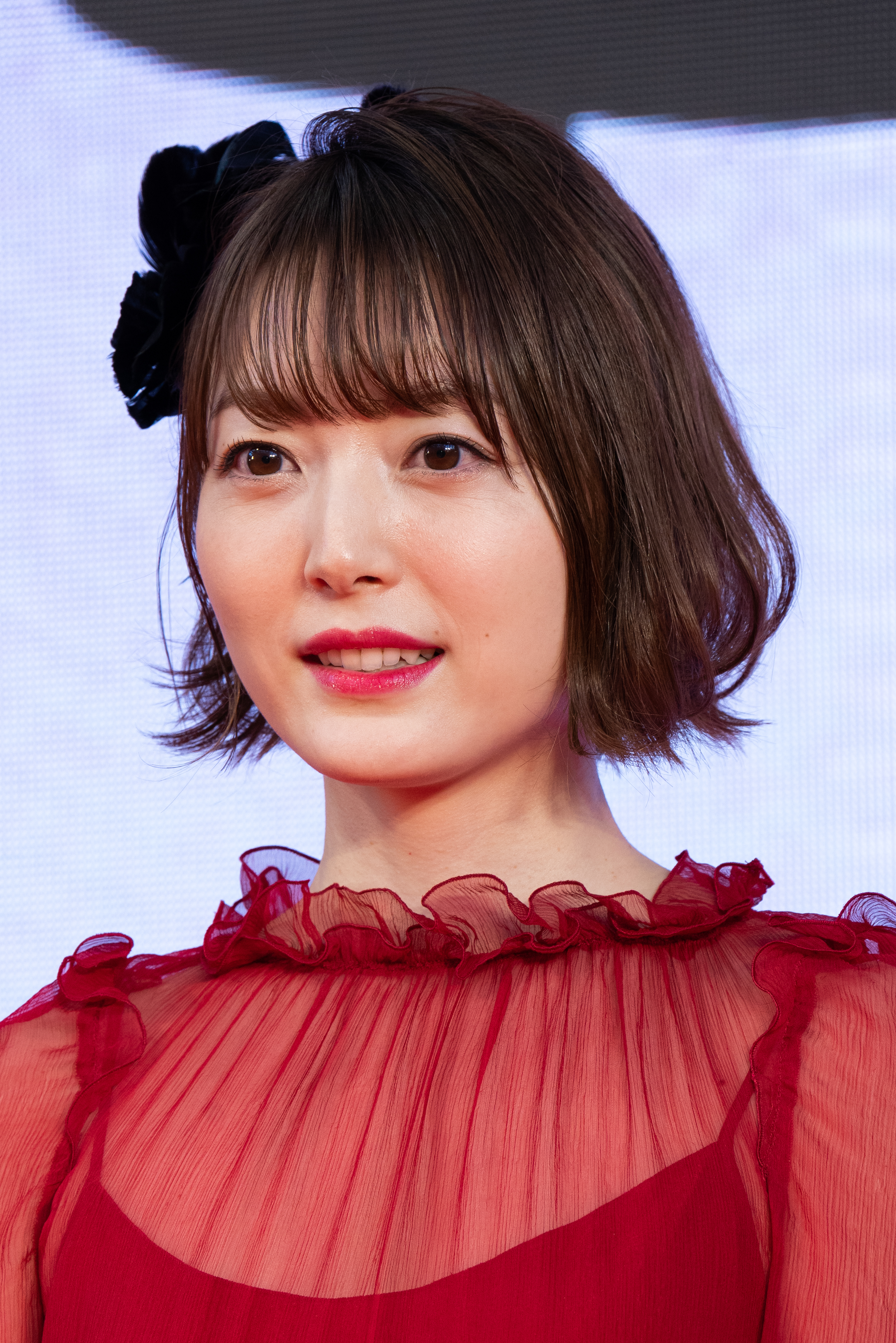
Kana Hanazawa wrote and performed the opening theme.

A live-action television series adapting the manga was produced by PROTX and Studio Blue, and premiered on the streaming service Paravi on February 1, 2023, with two new episodes released every week; it was additionally broadcast on TV Tokyo starting on April 5, 2023. The series was directed by Izuru Kumasaka, Ikuko Sawada, Kozue Sasaki, and Yuya Nakaizumi, and written by Yosuke Masaike, Ayumi Shimo, and Sawada. Yukitoshi Komatsu, who co-produced it with Sasaki and Yuji Hiratai, said that although the primary theme is cross-dressing, one of the strongest impressions he got from the manga and wanted to convey to viewers was the idea that people can change when given the chance.

The series stars Raiku as Haruomi, as his first leading role in a TV series; during his audition, which involved a scene at Spica Doll and experimenting with how to use his voice, he was not initially aware that the production was looking for a lead actor, and felt a lot of pressure due to the impact his part would have on the whole. He and Tomomi Maruyama, playing Momoe, both described feeling a mixture of excitement and anxiety over playing "beautiful" cross-dresser characters, having never worn women's clothes before; Raiku particularly described having difficulties with walking in high heels. In the end, he enjoyed the experience, and found that the role made him more conscious of elegance in acting. Shogo Sakamoto, playing Kokono, also found his role a challenge, and both he and Toman, playing Unipyo, said that they had to put effort into learning how to convincingly portray a cute cross-dresser; Keisuke Kida, playing Juka, had assumed that the Spica Doll staff would have been played by women.

The opening theme, "Circle", was written by Kei Sugawara and performed by Kana Hanazawa, who thought the fast-paced melody would suit the sudden turns in Haruomi's life. It was released as a single on April 5, 2023, and as a music video featuring pixel art animation. The ending theme, "Onna Tomodachi" (おんなともだち; "female friend"), was written and performed by Uragirionigiri AKA Hanako, who intended for it to lyrically and melodically encourage Haruomi in his personal growth.

=== Episodes ===
No.	Title	Directed by	Written by	Original release date
1	"Level.01"	Izuru Kumasaka	Yosuke Masaike	February 1, 2023
2	"Level.02"	Izuru Kumasaka	Yosuke Masaike	February 1, 2023
3	"Level.03"	Kozue Sasaki	Ayumi Shimo	February 8, 2023
4	"Level.04"	Yuya Nakaizumi	Ayumi Shimo	February 8, 2023
5	"Level.05"	Ikuko Sawada	Ikuko Sawada	February 15, 2023
6	"Level.06"	Ikuko Sawada	Ikuko Sawada	February 15, 2023
7	"Level.07"	Kozue Sasaki	Yosuke Masaike	February 22, 2023
8	"Level.08"	Izuru Kumasaka	Yosuke Masaike	February 22, 2023

== Reception ==
Eiga.com and Dwango.jp News describe the manga as popular with readers and on social media.
