= Satsuki Nakayama =

Japanese actor

- 中山 咲月
- Born: September 17, 1998 (age 28); Tokyo, Japan
- Occupations: Model; actor
- Years active: 2011-present
- Agent: Tencarat Plume
- Height: 168 cm (5 ft 6 in)
- Website: tencarat.co.jp/nakayamasatsuki

Satsuki Nakayama (中山 咲月, Nakayama Satsuki; born September 17, 1998) is a Japanese model and actor, known for his portrayal as Naki in Kamen Rider Zero-One and Shima Nishina in Kiss Him, Not Me. He started his modeling career as an exclusive model for the magazine Pichi Lemon and later became one of the standout models of Japan's genderless fashion subculture.

Nakayama initially came out as non-binary in 2019, but he later came out as a transgender man in 2021.

== Career ==
In 2011, at age 12, Nakayama became an exclusive model for the magazine Pichi Lemon. After seeing photos of Korean model Kaito on a fashion brand website, Nakayama was inspired by their androgynous appearance and began to wear more androgynous clothing, becoming an influential figure for women in Japan's genderless fashion subculture.

In 2018, Nakayama made his first television acting appearance in the live-action television adaptation of Chūgakusei Nikki. He later made his film debut in Nunuko no Seisen: Harajuku Story, playing Akihisa Kubo, frontman for the fictional band ORION. In 2019, He played the role of Kaoru in the Y!mobile webseries Parallel School Days, which later gained a theatrical release. In 2020, He appeared in Kamen Rider Zero-One and its direct-to-Blu-ray spin-off series, Project Thouser, as Naki, a character confirmed by producer Takahito Omori to be genderless.

Nakayama was slated to star in the 2020 theatre adaptation of All About J as Rita Barthelme; however, due to the COVID-19 pandemic, the production was cancelled.

Nakayama is a brand ambassador for unisex clothing brand BLAKICHY and a partner of its sister brand KINGLYMASK. In 2019, he started his own fashion line, Xspada.

== Personal life ==
In 2019, Nakayama came out as asexual and non-binary on his blog as well as in an interview with Vogue Girl, expressing his desire not to be defined as either male or female. In August 2021, he came out as a transgender man.

== Filmography ==
=== Television ===
Year	Title	Role	Network	Note
2018	Chūgakusei Nikki	Sarasa Aoyama	TBS	Supporting role
2020	Kamen Rider Zero-One	Naki / Kamen Rider Naki	TV Asahi	Supporting role
2020	Project Thouser	Naki	Direct-to-Blu-ray	Lead role
2022	Mr. Unlucky Has No Choice But to Kiss!	Mugi Sasaki	MBS	Supporting role

=== Film ===
Year	Title	Role	Notes
2018	Nunuko no Seisen: Harajuku Story	Akihisa Kubo	
2019	Parallel School Days	Kaoru	Supporting role
2020	Kiss Him, Not Me	Shima Nishina	Supporting role
2020	Kamen Rider Zero-One the Movie	Naki	Supporting role
2021	Zero-One Others: Kamen Rider Metsubou Jinrai	Naki	Supporting role
2023	Touken Ranbu the movie 2	Shuten Dōji	
2023	Takumi-kun	Izumi Tabayashi	Supporting role

=== Theater ===
Year	Title	Role	Notes
2025	Cherry Magic! Thirty Years of Virginity Can Make You a Wizard?!	Minato Wataya	
2025	Lychee Light Club	Jaibo	
