= Kenta Kamiya =

Japanese dancer, actor and singer (born 1995)

- 神谷健太
- Born: May 27, 1995 (age 30); Okinawa Prefecture, Japan
- Other name: Kamiken
- Occupations: Dancer, actor
- Years active: 2007–present
- Musical career
- Genres: J-pop, Dance
- Labels: LDH, Rhythm Zone
- Member of: The Rampage from Exile Tribe
- Website: www.ldh.co.jp/eng/management/kamiya/

Kenta Kamiya (神谷健太, Kamiya Kenta; born May 27, 1995) is a Japanese dancer, actor and singer. He is one of the performers of the J-Pop group The Rampage from Exile Tribe and a vocalist of their sub-unit MA55IVE The Rampage.

Kamiya is represented with LDH.

== Life and career ==
Kenta Kamiya was born on May 27, 1995, in Okinawa Prefecture, Japan. His childhood friends and former classmates include fellow The Rampage member Rui Yonamine, JO1's Sho Yonashiro and model Ryuchell.

Kamiya has been active as a child actor and starred in the two films Ryukyu Cowboy Yoroshiku Gozaimasu (2007) and Nirai no Oka〜A Song of Gondola〜 (2010).

However, when he was in his third grade of junior high school, he stopped his acting career and entered EXPG Okinawa, a talent school run by LDH.

Before and after The Rampage's debut Kamiya was active as a support dancer for Exile The Second. At that time, Exile The Second members Exile Shokichi and Nesmith, who act as a vocalist and performer, influenced him to pursue the same career, thus he was originally training to become a vocalist. During The Rampage's musha shugyō, he did indeed sing on stage two times, however his official position in the group is only being a performer.

In March 2014, he participated in the EXILE PERFORMER BATTLE AUDITION (to find a new performer for Exile) but didn't make it to the finals.

In April 2014, he was announced as a candidate member of The Rampage from Exile Tribe, and in September of the same year he became an official member.

During The Rampage's first tour The Rampage Live Tour 2017-2018 "Go on the Rampage" Kamiya was introduced as a member of the group's first sub-unit alongside 4 other performers. In this sub-unit he takes on the position of a vocalist, marking the first time he would provide his vocals to any work of The Rampage. The quintet made their official debut as MA55IVE THE RAMPAGE with the digital song "Determined" on February 6, 2020.

Kamiya was cast in TV Asashi's The 3Bs You Shouldn't Date as Bandman Yu.

== Works ==
=== Choreography ===
Group choreography
Year	Title	Notes	Ref.
2017	"Dirty Disco"	Alongside Zin and Rui Yonamine	

== Filmography ==
=== Movies ===
Year	Title	Role	Notes	Ref.
2007	Ryukyu Cowboy Yoroshiku Gozaimasu (Under the Grandpa's Umbrella)	Kaito Kinjo	Lead role	
2010	Nirai no Oka 〜A Song of Gondola〜	Ryo Kuwae	Lead role	
2012	Beyond Outrage			

=== TV series ===
Year	Title	Role	Network	Notes
2013	Okinawa no kowai hanashi	Yashikigami	RBC	Episode 2
2020	The 3Bs You Shouldn't Date	Bandman Yu	ABC TV / TV Asahi	

=== Music videos ===
Year	Artist	Title	Ref.
2016	Generations from Exile Tribe	"Ageha"	
