= Shohei Urakawa =

Japanese dancer and DJ (born 1997)

- 浦川 翔平
- Born: May 23, 1997 (age 28); Nagasaki Prefecture, Japan
- Other names: DJ Sho-hey
- Occupations: Dancer, DJ
- Years active: 2014–present
- Musical career
- Genres: J-pop, Dance
- Labels: LDH, Rhythm Zone
- Member of: The Rampage from Exile Tribe
- Website: Urakawa

Shohei Urakawa (浦川 翔平, Urakawa Shohei; born May 23, 1997) is a Japanese dancer and DJ. He is one of the performers of the Japanese group The Rampage from Exile Tribe.

== Life and career ==
Urakawa started dancing at the age of two.

In the first grade of primary school he started street dancing and became famous in his city.

In the same grade, he formed a trio dance unit with his friends called Roughnecks (ラフネックス) and they won numbers of competitions.

His activity gained a reputation and was introduced on the local NBC channel and NBC Radio's official blog as Expected Star of Nagasaki.

Urakawa has won the national championship at the "First National Championship of street dancing among primary schools" in "Super Chample" on Chūkyō TV.

He became interested in DJ-activity before Elementary school, and in the first grade of it he performed as a DJ at the dance competition "All Japan Super Kids", where Rather Unique (which was once formed by Exile's Makidai, Usa and Akira) performed, he has also developed his skills as a DJ and is showing off at events and live performances, his DJ name is "DJ Sho-hey".

In 2008, along with other artists he participated in the “Minna no Uta” program on NHK as part of the Crystal's Chrystal Children, a subgroup of “Crystal Winds” dancers.

In the same year, he co-starred with TRF's SAM on the MV of Hong Kong's popular singer Juno Mak "Wāi".

Urakawa attended EXPG (Exile Professional Gym) of Fukuoka as a scholarship student.

He appeared in various music videos such as: "Someday (Children's Version)" by Exile in 2009 and 24karats Stay Gold (kids & girls ver.).

From 2009 to 2010 he participated in Exile’s tours as a back-up dancer.

From 2011 to 2013, Urakawa was active as a support member of Generations.

In March 2014, he participated in Exile Performer Battle Audition and made it to the finals but was not selected to join Exile.

In April of the same year, he was announced as a candidate member of The Rampage, and in September he became an official member.

In January 2019, he was appointed as the tourism ambassador of Nagasaki City.

== Works ==
=== Singles ===
Year	Release date	Title	Artist
2008	April 23	Crystal Children	Crystals

== Filmography ==
=== TV shows ===
Year	Title	Network	Notes	Ref.
2019	"Gyutto Music"	KTV	MC alongside fellow member Shogo Iwaya	

=== Music videos ===
Year	Artist	Title
2008	Juno Mak	Wāi
2009	Exile	Someday (kids ver.)
2011	Exile	24karats Stay Gold (kids & girls ver.)
2012	Generations from Exile Tribe	Brave It Out
2013	Generations from Exile Tribe	Animal
2013	Generations from Exile Tribe	Love You More
2013	Generations from Exile Tribe	Hot Shot
2014	Exile Tribe	24karats TRIBE OF GOLD

== Other ==
Year	Role	Ref.
2019	Tourism ambassador of Nagasaki City	
