= Toman (actor) =

Japanese actor, model, and former singer

- とまん
- Born: Toman Sasaki (佐々木 とまん, Sasaki Toman); September 14, 1993 (age 32); Miyagi Prefecture, Japan
- Occupations: Model; actor
- Years active: 2009-present
- Agent: Platinum Production
- Musical career
- Genres: J-pop
- Label: Sony Music Associated Records
- Formerly of: XOX

YouTube information
- Channel: Toman
- Years active: 2020–present
- Genres: Beauty; vlog
- Subscribers: 4.41 thousand
- Views: 382 thousand
- Last updated: 4 September 2024
- Website: talent.platinumproduction.jp/toman

Toman Sasaki (佐々木 とまん, Sasaki Toman; born September 14, 1993), known professionally as Toman, is a Japanese actor, model, and former singer. He began his career as an amateur model and is credited with popularizing genderless fashion in Japan. In 2016, he debuted in the boy band XOX as their leader and later left the group in 2017.

== Early life ==
Toman was born on September 14, 1993, in Miyagi Prefecture. In junior high school, he dressed in Shibuya-kei outfits using the magazine Men's Egg as an example. While he was in high school, he began to imitate Korean fashion seen in K-pop and began wearing make-up and colored contacts. During this time, his blog gained attention when he posted an image of himself styled after South Korean singer Kim Jae-joong. In high school, he was also classmates with Japanese actor Mario Kuroba. After graduating from high school, Toman studied abroad in Sydney, Australia, for 10 months.

== Career ==
After returning to Japan, Toman attended an event held for models Yohdi Kondo and Tom Fujita, where one of the staff members had noticed him and mentioned his blog. Inspired, Toman decided to work at a clothing shop in Sendai to increase his profile and subsequently became a reader model for various fashion magazines. Around 2015, when genderless fashion gained popularity, Toman began making television appearances as the fashion subculture's representative. The term "genderless" to describe the fashion subculture was coined by his agent, Takashi Marumoto, to name Toman's aesthetic.

In 2016, Toman debuted in a boy band XOX as their leader. He left the group on November 28, 2017.

== Filmography ==
=== Film ===
Year	Title	Role	Notes	Ref.
2017	Cage	Tsubasa	—N/a	
2019	Jūni-nin no Shinitai Kodomo-tachi	No. 13	—N/a	
2019	Meiji Tokyo Renka	Kyoka Izumi	—N/a	

=== Television ===
Year	Title	Role	Notes	Ref.
2023	Don't Stop My Beautification	Unipyo	—N/a	

=== Theater ===
Year	Title	Role	Notes	Ref.
2017	B-Project	Ryūji Korekuni	—N/a	
2019	K: Return of Kings	Sukuna Gojo	—N/a	
2019	Dynamic Chord the Stage	Bishop	—N/a	
