= Shogo Iwaya =

Japanese dancer and actor (born 1997)

- 岩谷翔吾
- Born: March 11, 1997 (age 29); Osaka Prefecture, Japan
- Other names: Iwasho, Shogo
- Occupations: Dancer, actor
- Years active: 2014–present
- Musical career
- Genres: J-pop, Dance
- Labels: LDH, Rhythm Zone
- Website: Iwaya

Shogo Iwaya (岩谷翔吾, Iwaya Shogo; born 11 March 1997) is a Japanese dancer and actor. He is one of the performers of the J-Pop group The Rampage from Exile Tribe.

Iwaya is represented with LDH.

== Career ==
In 2007, Iwaya started dancing in "Exile Live Tour 2007 Exile Evolution".

He attended EXPG Osaka school.

From 2011 to 2013, Iwaya was active as a support member of Generations.

In March 2014, he auditioned for Exile Performer Battle Audition (to find a new performer for EXILE) but didn't make it to the finals. In April of the same year, he was announced as a candidate member of The Rampage, and in September he became an official member.

In October 2016, he made his acting debut with High & Low The Movie.

== Personal life ==
Gekidan Exile's Kanta Sato was his classmate.

== Filmography ==
=== Movies ===
Year	Title	Role	Notes	Ref.
2016	High & Low: The Movie	Ken		
2017	High & Low The Movie 2 / End Of Sky	Ken		
2017	High & Low THE Movie 3 / Final Mission	Ken		
2019	Cheer Boys!!	Gen Hasegawa		

=== Dramas ===
Year	Title	Role	Network	Ref.
2019	High & Low The Worst Episode.0	Ken	NTV	
2019	Kafka's Tokyo Despair Diary	Natsuo Akino	MBS	

=== Stage ===
Year	Title
2017	Hounangumi presents "Attack No. 1"
2017	Hounangumi presents reading play "Aitakute..."
2018	Hounangumi presents `THE mensetsu'
2019	Hounangumi presents reading play "Aozora"
2020	Reading drama Book Act "Mou ichido kimi to odoritai/ I want to dance with you again"

=== TV shows ===
Year	Title	Network	Notes	Ref.
2019	"Gyutto Music"	KTV	MC alongside fellow member Shohei Urakawa	

=== Music videos ===
Year	Title	Artist	Ref.
2008	Gingatetsudou 999	Exile	
2012	Brave It Out	Generations from Exile Tribe	
2013	Animal	Generations from Exile Tribe	
2013	Love You More	Generations from Exile Tribe	
2013	Hot Shot	Generations from Exile Tribe	
2016	Ageha	Generations from Exile Tribe	
