= Junko Mitsuhashi =

Japanese social and cultural historian

Junko Mitsuhashi (三橋 順子, Mitsuhashi Junko; born May 23, 1955) is a Japanese social and cultural historian. She specializes in the history of gender and sexuality, with a particular focus on the social and cultural history of transgender people in Japan. Mitsuhashi is recognized as the first transgender lecturer at a Japanese university.

== Career ==
Around 1995, Mitsuhashi began lecturing and writing from the perspective of male-to-female transgender individuals. In 1999, she started conducting historical and sociological research on transgender communities in Japan. In 2000, she was appointed as a lecturer in sociology within the Faculty of Letters at Chuo University, becoming the first openly transgender faculty member at a Japanese university.

Her seminal book, Josou to Nihonjin (Cross-Dressing and the Japanese), received the 19th Mineo Hashimoto Award in 2010, presented by the Society for the Study of Contemporary Customs.

== Works ==
- Josou to Nihonjin (Cross-dressing and the Japanese) Kodansha, 2008, ISBN 978-4062879606
- Shinjuku "sei naru machi" no rekishi chiri, Asahi shimbun shuppan, 2018, ISBN 978-4022630773
- Rekishi no naka no tayousei: Nihon to ajia hengen suru sekushuarite, 2022. Iwanaimi shoten, ISBN 978-4000256759
