= Makoto Hasegawa (dancer) =

Japanese dancer and actor (born 1998)

- 長谷川慎
- Born: 29 July 1998 (age 27); Kanagawa Prefecture, Japan
- Occupations: Dancer, actor
- Years active: 2014–present
- Agent: LDH
- Musical career
- Genres: J-pop, Dance
- Label: Rhythm Zone
- Website: Hasegawa

Makoto Hasegawa (長谷川慎, Hasegawa Makoto; born 29 July 1998) is a Japanese dancer and actor, he is a member of the Japanese group The Rampage from Exile Tribe.

== Career ==
Makoto attended EXPG (Exile Professional Gym) of Tokyo and auditioned for The Rampage via Global Japan Challenge.

In September 2014, he became an official member of the group.

As a child he featured in some EXILE music videos and also used to be a Generations from Exile Tribe support member from 2011 to 2013.

He is one of the members of a Krump dance crew "Rag Pound" with fellow members Kaisei Takechi and Kazuma Kawamura.

In October 2018, he made his acting debut with drama Prince Of Legend.

In September 2019, Makoto played in the YouTube web drama Shujin-kō (主人公).

In January 2023, Makoto played the lead role in the stage play Romeo & Juliet along with Kie Kitano.

In March 2024, Makoto played the lead role in the TV drama Love is Better the Second Time Around along with Robin Furuya.

== Works ==
=== Choreography ===
Group choreography
| Year | Title | Notes | Ref. |
|---|---|---|---|
| 2018 | Dream On | Alongside Takahide Suzuki | |
| 2018 | Hard Hit | Alongside Shogo Yamamoto and Kaisei Takechi | |

== Filmography ==
=== TV series ===
| Year | Title | Role | Network | Notes | Ref. |
|---|---|---|---|---|---|
| 2018 | Prince of Legend | Riku Odajima | NTV | | |
| 2019 | Kizoku Tanjou -Prince Of Legend- | Riku Odajima | NTV | | |
| 2021 | App de Koi Suru 20 no Joken (アプリで恋する20の条件) | Takeo | NTV | special drama | |
| 2021 | Kao Dake Sensei (顔だけ先生) | Tomoya Morito | Fuji TV; Tokai TV | | |
| 2023 | Ciguatera | Taniwaki | TV Tokyo | | |
| 2023 | Spinning Around My Whirl | Nyan | NTV | special drama | |
| 2024 | Love is Better the Second Time Around | Akihiro Miyata | MBS; TBS | | |
| 2024 | Re:kon ko ya (離婚後夜) | Shinya Kanaori | ABC TV; TV Asahi | | |
| 2024 | Red Blue | Sannosuke Iwase | MBS; TBS; Netflix | | |

=== Movies ===
| Year | Title | Role | Ref. |
|---|---|---|---|
| 2019 | Prince of Legend | Riku Odajima | |
| 2020 | Kizoku Kourin -Prince Of Legend- | Riku Odajima | |
| 2022 | High&Low The Worst X | Shoji Sameoka | |
| 2024 | Love is Better the Second Time Around -special edition- | Akihiro Miyata | |

=== Web Dramas ===
| Year | Title | Role | Network | Ref. |
|---|---|---|---|---|
| 2019 | Shujin-kō (主人公) | Yujiro Ikeda | YouTube | |

=== Theatre ===
| Year | Title | Role |
|---|---|---|
| 2020 | Book Act "Mou ichido kimi to odoritai" (もう一度君と踊りたい) | |
| 2021 | Eternal | Chloe |
| 2022 | Book Act "Starting Point" | |
| 2022 | Eternal 2 | Chloe |
| 2023 | Romeo & Juliet | Romeo |
| 2024 | Book Act "Mou ichido kimi to odoritai" (もう一度君と踊りたい) | |

=== Music Videos ===
| Year | Artist | Title |
|---|---|---|
| 2011 | Exile | Each Other’s Way~Tabi no Tochuu~ |
| 2011 | Exile | 24karats STAY GOLD (kids & girls ver.) |
| 2011 | Exile | VICTORY |
| 2012 | Generations from Exile Tribe | Brave It Out |
| 2013 | Generations from Exile Tribe | Animal |
| 2013 | Generations from Exile Tribe | Love You More |
| 2013 | Generations from Exile Tribe | Hot Shot |
| 2014 | Exile Tribe | 24karats TRIBE OF GOLD |

=== Game ===
| Year | Title | Role | Notes |
|---|---|---|---|
| 2019 | Prince Of Legend Love Royale | Riku Odajima | Released on March 25 Available on iOS / Android |
