= The Rampage from Exile Tribe =

J-pop vocal and dance group

The Rampage
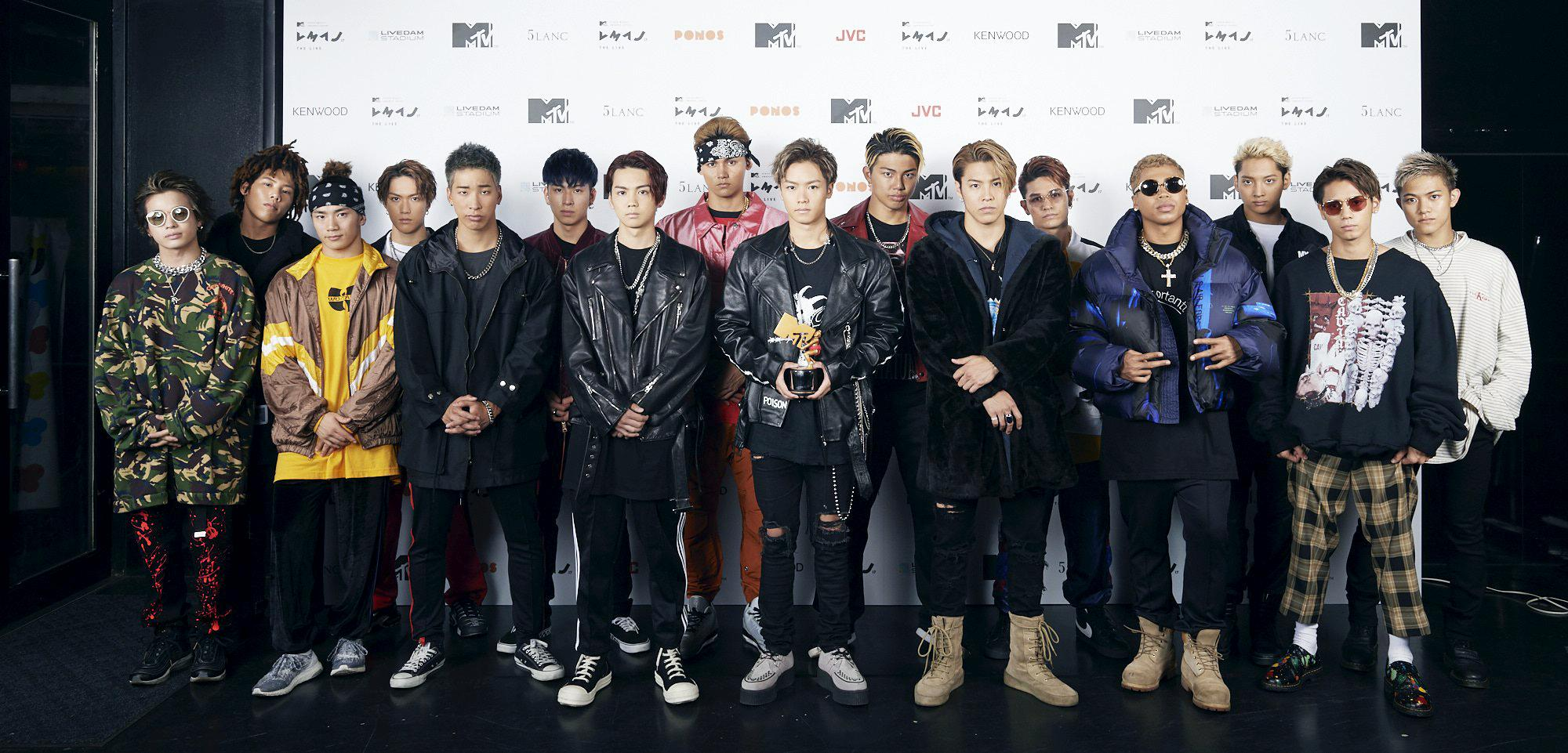
- The Rampage at the VMAJ 2017 Awards.

Background information
- Also known as: RMPG; RAMPAGE
- Origin: Tokyo, Japan
- Genres: J-pop; Pop; dance; hip hop; electronic; EDM; R&B
- Years active: 2014–present
- Labels: Rhythm Zone, LDH
- Spinoff of: Exile Tribe
- Members: Likiya; Zin; Riku; Kenta Kamiya; Rui Yonamine; Shogo Yamamoto; Kazuma Kawamura; Hokuto Yoshino; Shogo Iwaya; Shohei Urakawa; Itsuki Fujiwara; Kaisei Takechi; Makoto Hasegawa; Ryu; Takahide Suzuki; Takuma Goto
- Website: therampage-ldh.jp

The Rampage from Exile Tribe (Japanese: ザ・ランページ・フロム・エグザイル・トライブ, stylized as THE RAMPAGE from EXILE TRIBE and also known as The Rampage), is a J-pop vocal and dance group formed and managed by talent agency LDH and signed to Avex's record label Rhythm Zone. The Rampage is part of the collective supergroup, Exile Tribe and is composed of sixteen members. The group was formed in 2014 and the members were chosen from Exile's Vocal Battle Audition 4, Exile Performer Battle Audition and Global Japan Challenge auditions. The Rampage made their debut in January 2017 with the release of their first single "Lightning".

== History ==
=== 2014–2016: Pre-debut ===
On April 11, 2014, Exile Hiro announced on the TV show Sukkiri!! a new group being formed for Exile Tribe.

On September 12, 2014, the final sixteen members of The Rampage were recruited from participants of "Exile Performer Battle Audition", a competition to be part of EXILE, "Vocal Battle Audition 4", a competition for young people who dream of being vocalists, and "Global Japan Challenge", a program for young people who dream of performing internationally and form a dance and vocal group. The name of the group, "The Rampage (run about wildly)" shows that the group would always dance wildly and passionately on stage. Before debuting, they went on their Musha Shugyo, touring the country for 2 years as part of their training. They performed for free in various places in Japan. Through these performances, they bonded as a group, improved as performers and gained fans. As part of their Musha Shugyo, the group also participated in Exile Tribe's "Exile Tribe Perfect Year Live Tour Tower of Wish 2014 ~The Revolution~" dome tours. In their final year of Musha Shugyo, the group split up into 3 separate teams to promote and improve themselves more individually.

Prior to their debut, the members of the group (specifically the performers) also participated in tours from other LDH artists as support members, such as Exile The Second's tour Exile the Second Live Tour 2016–2017 "Wild Wild Warriors".

On September 27, 2016, it was revealed the group would make their major debut with their first single in early 2017.

=== 2017: Debut with "Lightning" and first tour ===
The Rampage debuted on January 25, 2017, with their first single "Lightning" peaking at #2 on the Oricon Weekly Charts and being certified 'Gold' by the RIAJ for selling 100,000 physical copies. The group received their first major award in the MTV Video Music Awards Japan for their "Lightning" music video.

In the following months of April and July The Rampage released their second and third single "Frontiers" and 'Dirty Disco' which peaked at #3 and #5 respectively.

In early November, The Rampage released their fourth single '100degrees'. The single reached #6 in the Oricon Weekly Charts and earned the group the 'New Wave Artist Award' at the Asia Artist Awards where they performed for the first time overseas. Later in December The Rampage embarked on their first tour ever The Rampage Live Tour 2017-2018 "Go on the Rampage" starting in December and ending in March 2018.

=== 2018: Final dates of their first tour, singles and first album The Rampage ===
On April 25, 2018, the group released their 5th single "Fandango", followed by their 6th single "Hard Hit" on July 18. On August 13, 14, 16 and 17 the group held the final dates of their first tour, which were titled The Rampage Live Tour 2017–2018 "Go on the Rampage" The Final.

On September 12, 2018, the group released their first album The Rampage. On the same day, their second tour and first arena tour named The Rampage Live Tour 2019 "Throw Ya Fist" that would go through 2019 was announced.

=== 2019: Second tour, Battle of Tokyo and second album The Riot ===
The group's 7th single "Throw Ya Fist" was released on January 30, 2019, as the kickoff single for their next tour. The single also included "Down By Law" as a B-side track, which acted the opening theme song for the anime Fairy Tail and was the group's first anime opening since their debut. From February 6 to May 26, the group went on their second tour The Rampage Live Tour 2019 "Throw Ya Fist", which was also their first arena tour in Japan.

In June 2019, the Battle of Tokyo project started, which includes all Jr.Exile groups. During this month those 4 groups released collaboration singles every week, until they released a full album titled "Battle of Tokyo 〜Enter the Jr.Exile〜" on July 3, 2019. Accompanying the album release, the groups held a row of live performances from July 4 to 7 with the same name.

On July 31, the group released their 8th single "Welcome 2 Paradise", with a music video shot at Paradise City in South Korea. The single included "Nobody" as a B-side track, being the group's first original English song.

On August 8, it was announced that the group would release their 9th single "Swag & Pride" on October 2, which is also used in the TV drama High&Low the Worst Episode.O. and the movie HighLow: The Worst. Shortly after on August 19, The Rampage announced their second album to be released on October 30. The CD/2DVD and CD/2Blu-ray versions would also include live footage of The Rampage Live Tour 2019 "Throw Ya Fist" concert at Saitama Super Arena.

On September 10, nearly one year after the release of their first album, it was announced that the title of their second album would be The Riot. Two days later an event called The Rampage from Exile Tribe 5th Anniversary Special Event was held, celebrating five years since the group's formation. Shortly after, the group attended the High&Low The Worst vs The Rampage from Exile Tribe Premium Live Show, a live event featuring the cast of the upcoming movie which gathered an audience of about 50 thousand people over two days. Due to the success of this event, a similar live show was held at Yokohama Arena with Doberman Infinity as a surprise guest on December 26. On October 10, the group released the music video for the title track "Move The World" to promote their new album.

About a month after the release of the group's second album on October 30, it was announced that The Rampage would release their 10th single "Full Metal Trigger" on January 15, 2020. The single would also serve as the theme song of The Rampage Live Tour 2020 "RMPG" and include the full live footage of the group's first appearance at a-nation on August 18, 2019.

On December 8, it was revealed that The Rampage and Fantastics would be in charge of the special movie theme songs for the 40th anniversary project of Mobile Suit Gundam titled Gundam × KenOkuyama Design × LDH Japan “G40 Project”. The Rampage's theme song "SHOW YOU THE WAY" and Fantastics' theme song "To the Sky" would both reflect the story of Mobile Suit Gundam from two different aspects. The full special movie project was released on Gundam's official YouTube channel on January 1, 2020.

=== 2020: Third tour, Ma55ive the Rampage and Live×Online ===
After the release of their 10th single "Full Metal Trigger" on January 15, the group started their third tour The Rampage Live Tour 2020 "RMPG" on February 5, 2020, and planned to conclude it on May 10. On the second day of their tour, the group's sub-unit Ma55ive the Rampage released their first official digital song titled "Determined". This sub-unit had been introduced during their first tour The Rampage Live Tour 2017-2018 "Go on the Rampage" for the first time and consists of the 5 members Likiya, Kenta, Yamasho, Shohei and Takahide. Furthermore, they released their 11th single "Invisible Love" on April 22, which marked the first time they would have a slow-tempo song as a title track.

Due to the consequences of the COVID-19 pandemic in 2020, several concerts of The Rampage's third tour had to be cancelled or postponed. As a reparation, the group held a live event with no audience that was streamed on the Japanese video service niconico (Nico Nico Douga) on March 24, 2020. A total of over 280 thousand viewers watched the broadcast which lasted about 1 hour and 45 minutes. Furthermore, the group held a series of livestreamed concerts on the Japanese streaming platform AbemaTV from July to December. Live×Online "The Rampage" was held on July 8, and Live×Online Imagination "The Rampage" was held on September 19. On October 30, they participated on Live×Online Infinity "Trick or Treat!! R.F.B. Halloween Party!!", and finally Live×Online Beyond the Border on December 22.

On September 30, the group released their 12th single titled "Fears" which served as the theme song for Fuji TV drama "Terror Newspaper". On December 9, the group released their 13th single and last of the year titled "My Prayer", it acted as the theme song for Abema TV's "Koi Suru Shuumatsu Homestay".

On December 31, the group took part in the livestreamed concert of LDH artists, Live×Online Countdown 2020▶2021"Rising Sun to the World".

=== 2021: Reboot ===
On February 24, the group released their third studio album Reboot which includes all their songs starting from 2020 plus the album's promotional track "Silver Rain" which was pre-released digitally on February 1.

On April 18, a new album by Jr.Exile for the Battle of Tokyo project titled "Battle of Tokyo Time 4 Jr.Exile" was announced to be released on June 23, the songs by the individual groups and the collaboration song of Generations & The Rampage were pre-released digitally from April 19 to June 21, the music videos were released in a hybrid live-action/animated form, with this latter featuring the four groups' avatars. Moreover, the DVD Version included the concert video of "Battle Of Tokyo ~Enter The Jr.Exile~" held in Makuhari Messe in July 2019.

On June 30, the group released their 14th single "Heatwave", two songs from the single were pre-released digitally ahead of the single's release: "Your Life Your Game" which was used as a tie-in for Morinaga's Ice Box Web CM on April 7, and "All about Tonight" which served as the opening of the group's variety show Run! Run! Rampage‼︎ on May 3.

On October 27, the group released their 15th single "Living In The Dream", the b-sides included three songs which were all pre-released digitally: "Moon and Back" as the main theme song and "Stampede" as the insert song of the stage play Real RPG Stage "Eternal" which stars several of the group's members, plus "Off The Wall" which acted as the ending theme of the TV drama Tokyo Seimenjo which stars Hokuto Yoshino.

On December 1, the group released the tribute single "The Rampage from Exile" as a part of Exile's 20th anniversary celebration project "Exile Tribute", the single is the first of the four consecutive tribute singles releases by Jr.Exile groups.

=== 2022: Ray of Light ===
On January 25, the group released their fourth studio album titled Ray of Light, which included all their songs released in 2021 plus the album's promotional track titled Ray Of Light with 13 songs in total.

In February, a new song titled "Change My Life" was introduced as the ending theme of the TV drama Dame na Otoko ja Dame Desuka? starring Machida Keita. The song was officially released as a digital single on March 2.

On September 7, the group released their 16th single titled "THE POWER". The title song was used as the theme song for the movie HiGH&LOW THE WORST X.

In late summer, their new song "Tsunage Kizuna" was used as the official TBS theme song for the "2022 World Volleyball Women's Tournament". The song was pre-released digitally on September 25 and later released on October 19 as the title track of their 17th single, which was the second work of a 3-month consecutive release project.

2023: Studio album and collaboration

On February 22, THE RAMPAGE released their fifth studio album ROUND & ROUND.

On May 2, the group released their 19th single "16BOOSTERZ".

On August 2, the group released their 20th single and second double A-side single "Summer Riot ~Nettaiya~ / Everest". On November 8, the group released their 21st single "Katasumi".

November 24, THE RAMPAGE released the digital single "What is done". The song is a collaboration with the Thai group BOOM BOOM CASH.

The groups performance of their 2023 single "Soldier Love" sparked controversy for wearing nazi-like uniforms and showing nazi-like gestures on television. The song itself was criticized for its lyrics which play on the imperialistic history of the country. As a result, the group had to postpone the release of their two albums, 16Soul and 16Pray, which were originally scheduled for release on January 25, 2024. An apology was published on December 25, 2023.

2024: 16SOUL, 16PRAY

On January 15, the group pre-released the song "STARRY LOVE" digitally, ahead of the best album 16PRAY, for which it served as the lead song.

On February 14, THE RAMPAGE released their first best albums 16SOUL and 16PRAY, divided into an "UP BEST" and "MID & BALLADE BEST" concept. The albums each include a total of 17 songs, 16 songs chosen by fan votes and one new song that is the specific album's lead song.

From April 6 to July 21, they embarked on their eighth tour THE RAMPAGE LIVE TOUR 2024 "CyberHelix" RX-16. On May 8, THE RAMPAGE released their 22nd single "CyberHelix", with its title track being the theme song of the THE RAMPAGE LIVE TOUR 2024 "CyberHelix" RX-16.

On July 24, the group released their 23rd single "24karats GOLD GENESIS".

On September 11 and 12, they held the special concert THE RAMPAGE LIMITED LIVE 2024 *p(R)ojectR® at TOKYO DOME. On October 30, the group released their 24th single "Endless Happy-Ending".

2025: (R)ENEW and PRIMAL SPIDER

On March 5, the group released their sixth studio album (R)ENEW. Prior to its release, the song "Drown Out The Noise" which serves as the theme song of the movie Isho, Koukai. starring member Yoshino Hokutowas pre-released digitally on December 17, 2024.

From June 3 to November 1, they will embark on their tenth tour THE RAMPAGE LIVE TOUR 2025 "PRIMAL SPIDER" ~Meguraseru Ito~.

On July 20, the group held their second overseas concert and first in Taipei titled THE RAMPAGE LIVE TOUR 2025 "PRIMAL SPIDER" ~Borderless Threads~ in TAIPEI.

On October 15, they will release their 25th single "Jiyuu e no Daidassou".

== Side projects ==
=== Ma55ive the Rampage ===
The first sub-unit established from The Rampage is Ma55ive the Rampage which consists of the 5 performers Likiya, Kenta, Yamasho, Shohei and Takahide. The unit focuses on Hip-Hop and features Likiya, Yamasho, Shohei and Takahide as rappers while Kenta acts as a vocalist. This is the first time those members provide vocals to any The Rampage work. The quintet was introduced during The Rampage's first tour The Rampage Live Tour 2017-2018 "Go on the Rampage" and made their official debut with the digital song "Determined" on February 6, 2020.

On May 27, 2020, the unit was scheduled to perform as opening act of the Exile Shokichi vs CrazyBoy "King & King" concert at Yokohama Arena in a battle with the rappers of Ballistik Boyz, but the concert was later cancelled.

On December 2, 2020, the unit released their second digital single titled "No.1". On July 17, 2021, the unit released their third digital single "Drip Drop".

== Members ==
- Likiya
- Zin (陣, Jin)
- Riku
- Kenta Kamiya (神谷 健太, Kamiya Kenta)
- Rui Yonamine (与那嶺 瑠唯, Yonamine Rui)
- Shogo Yamamoto (山本 彰吾, Yamamoto Shōgo)
- Kazuma Kawamura (川村 壱馬, Kawamura Kazuma)
- Hokuto Yoshino (吉野 北人, Yoshino Hokuto)
- Shogo Iwaya (岩谷 翔吾, Iwaya Shōgo)
- Shohei Urakawa (浦川 翔平, Urakawa Shōhei)
- Itsuki Fujiwara (藤原 樹, Fujiwara Itsuki)
- Kaisei Takechi (武知 海青, Takechi Kaisei)
- Makoto Hasegawa (長谷川 慎, Hasegawa Makoto)
- Ryu (龍, Ryū)
- Takahide Suzuki (鈴木 昂秀, Suzuki Takahide)
- Takuma Goto (後藤 拓磨, Gotō Takuma)

== Discography ==
=== Albums ===
Title	Album details	Peak chart positions	Certifications
Title	Album details	JPN	Certifications
The Rampage	Released: September 12, 2018 (JPN); Label: Rhythm Zone; Formats: CD, CD/DVD, CD/Blu-ray, digital download	2	
The Riot	Released: October 30, 2019 (JPN); Label: Rhythm Zone; Formats: CD, CD/DVD, CD/Blu-ray, digital download	3	RIAJ (physical): Gold
Reboot	Released: February 24, 2021 (JPN); Label: Rhythm Zone; Formats: CD, CD/DVD, CD/Blu-ray, digital download	2	
Ray of Light	Released: January 25, 2022 (JPN); Label: Rhythm Zone; Formats: CD, CD/DVD, CD/Blu-ray, digital download	2	
Round & Round	Released: February 22, 2023 (JPN); Label: Rhythm Zone; Formats: CD, CD/DVD, CD/Blu-ray, digital download	3	
16Soul	Released: February 14, 2024 (JPN); Label: Rhythm Zone; Formats: CD, CD/DVD, CD/Blu-ray, digital download	2	
16Pray	Released: February 14, 2024 (JPN); Label: Rhythm Zone; Formats: CD, CD/DVD, CD/Blu-ray, digital download	3	
(R)enew	Released: March 5, 2025 (JPN); Label: Rhythm Zone; Formats: CD, CD/DVD, CD/Blu-ray, digital download	3	

=== Singles ===
Title	Year	Peak chart positions		Certifications	Album
Title	Year	JPN	JPN Hot	Certifications	Album
"Lightning"	2017	2	2	RIAJ (physical): Gold	The Rampage
"Frontiers"	2017	3	4		The Rampage
"Dirty Disco"	2017	5	5		The Rampage
"100 Degrees"	2017	8	11		The Rampage
"Fandango"	2018	2	3		The Rampage
"Hard Hit"	2018	3	4		The Rampage
"Throw Ya Fist"	2019	3	5	RIAJ (physical): Gold	The Riot
"Welcome 2 Paradise"	2019	3	3		The Riot
"Swag & Pride"	2019	2	10		The Riot
"Fullmetal Trigger"	2020	4	13		Reboot
"Invisible Love"	2020	2	13		Reboot
"Fears"	2020	6	12		Reboot
"My Prayer"	2020	4	25		Reboot
"Heatwave"	2021	2	19		Ray of Light
"Living in the Dream"	2021	3	—		Ray of Light
"The Power"	2022	4	10		Non-album single
"Tsunage Kizuna"	2022	2	3		16Soul
"Round Up" / "Kimiomō" (featuring Miyavi)	2022	6	17		16Pray
"No Gravity"	2023	—	35		16Soul
"16Boosterz"	2023	2	2		16Soul
"Summer Riot (Nettaiya)"	2023	1	2		16Soul
"Everest"	2023	1	96		16Soul
"Katasumi" (片隅)	2023	2	5		Non-album singles
"What Is Done" (featuring Boom Boom Cash)	2023	—	66		Non-album singles
"Soldier Love"	2023	—	47		16Soul
"CyberHelix"	2024	3	6		Non-album singles
"24 Karats Gold Genesis"	2024	1	1		Non-album singles
"Endless Happy-Ending"	2024	2	4		Non-album singles
"Drown Out the Noise"	2024	—	100		Non-album singles
"Burn"	2025	—	53		(R)enew
"Running Running Running" (featuring Shōnan no Kaze)	2025	3	12		Non-album singles
"Break It Down"	2026	2	20		Non-album singles
"Black Tokyo"	2026	3	9		Non-album singles
"One Shot"	2026	10	40		Non-album singles

=== As featured artist ===
Title	Year	Album
"Unbreakable" vs. Generations from Exile Tribe	2016	High & Low Original Best Album
"Find a Way"	2016	High & Low Original Best Album
Shoot It Out Generations Vs The Rampage	2019	Battle Of Tokyo 〜Enter The Jr.Exile〜
Dead Or Alive The Rampage Vs Ballistik Boyz	2019	Battle Of Tokyo 〜Enter The Jr.Exile〜
Mix It Up The Rampage Vs Fantastics	2019	Battle Of Tokyo 〜Enter The Jr.Exile〜

== Filmography ==
=== Television series ===
Year	Title	Network	Notes	Ref.
2016	Night Hero Naoto	TV Tokyo	Episodes 1 & 6	

=== Television shows ===
Year	Title	Network	Notes	Ref.
2021–present	Run! Run! The Rampage!!	Nippon TV, Nagasaki International Television, Fukuoka, Hulu, dTV	On June 16 and June 17, 2021, two live shows titled RUN! RUN! RAMPAGE!! ~FIGHT & LIVE SHOW~ were held at Yokohama Arena with an audience.	

=== Web series ===
Year	Title	Network	Notes	Ref.
2018–2019	てっぺんとるぞ THE RAMPAGE (Teppen Toruzo THE RAMPAGE (2 Seasons)	GYAO!	Season 1 occurred from August to October, 2018 and Season 2 occurred from November, 2018 to March, 2019. The members get into pairs and challenge various No.1 spots in Japan.	
2022	The Rampage+The Rampage			
2022	Gutarampeiji ~THE RAMPAGE ni Gutarashite Morau Jikan~	ABEMA		

=== Radio shows ===
Year	Title	Notes	Ref.
2017–present	WEEKEND THE RAMPAGE	DJ Hosts: Zin and Riku	
2019–present	RMPG DOPE STATION	DJ Hosts: Likiya, Kenta Kamiya, Shohei Urakawa	
2021	THE RAMPAGE no All Night Nippon X (THE RAMPAGEのオールナイトニッポンX（クロス）)	DJ Hosts: Yoshino Hokuto, Iwaya Shogo and YAMASHO	

== Awards and nominations ==
Name of the award ceremony, year presented, category, nominee of the award, and the result of the nomination
Award ceremony	Year	Category	Nominee / Work	Result	Ref.
Asia Artist Awards	2017	New Wave Award	"100degrees"	Won	
Asia Artist Awards	2022	Best Artist	The Rampage from Exile Tribe	Won	
Asia Star Entertainer Awards	2024	The Best Star (Japan)	The Rampage from Exile Tribe	Won	
Japan Gold Disc Award	2018	Best 5 New Artists (Japanese)	The Rampage from Exile Tribe	Won	
MTV Video Music Awards Japan	2017	Best New Artist Video	"Lightning"	Won	
MTV Video Music Awards Japan	2021	Best Latin Video	"Heatwave"	Won	
MTV Video Music Awards Japan	2022	Best Choreography	"Ray of Light"	Won	
