= E-girls discography =

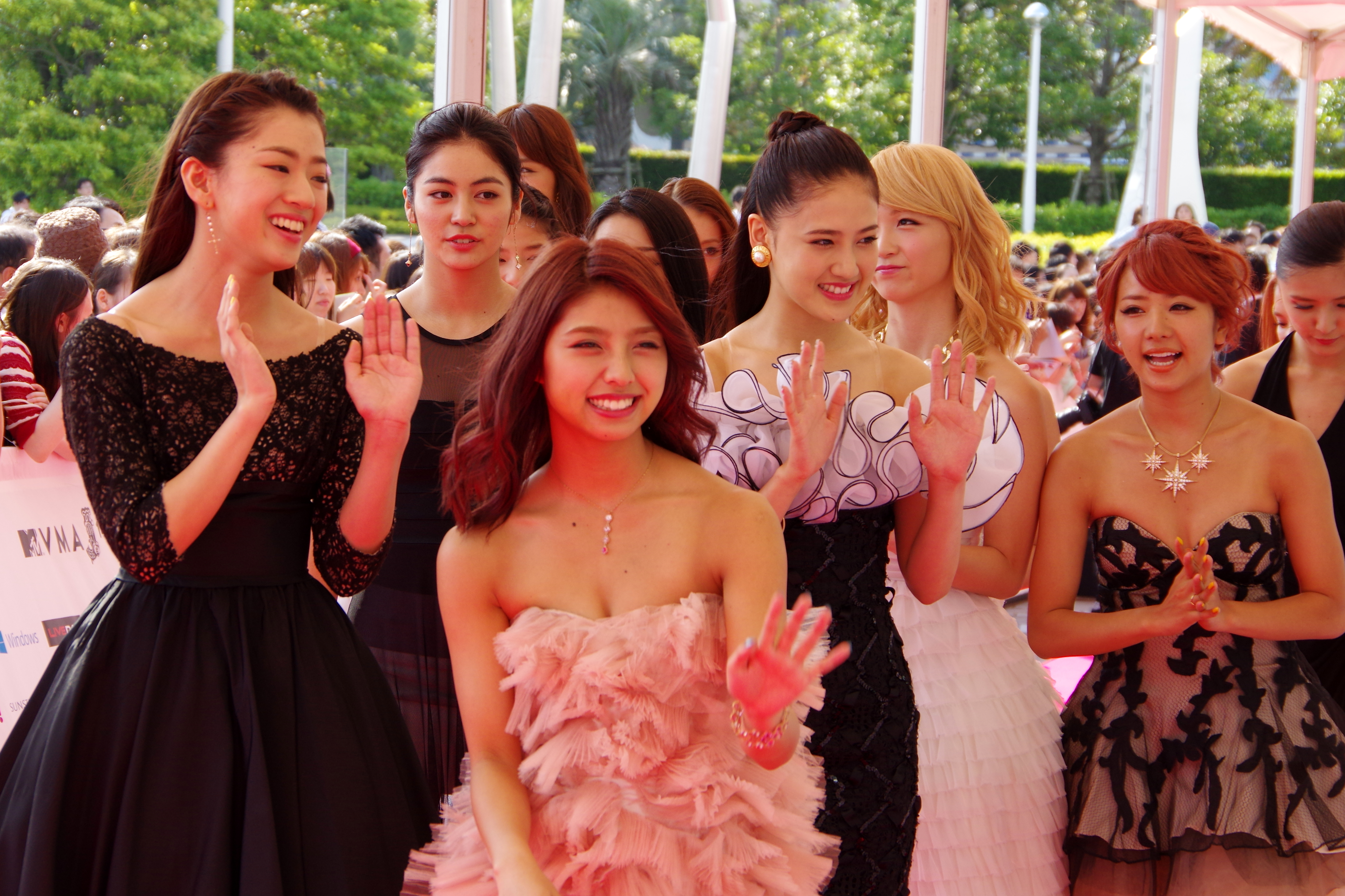
- Some members of E-girls at the 2014 MTV Video Music Awards Japan.
- Studio albums: 5
- Compilation albums: 1
- Singles: 18
- Video albums: 3
- Music videos: 39

Japanese collective unit E-girls have released five studio albums, one greatest hits compilation album, three live DVDs, 39 music videos, and 18 singles. E-girls are a unit composed of three sub-groups: Dream, Happiness and Flower, and three original members. Additionally, the band also incorporates two other units; Rabbits and Bunnies, who are yet-to-debut groups and serve under the management LDH, managed by Exile Hiro. They debuted with their single "Celebration!", which generated moderate success in Japan. Follow-up releases managed to achieve more notability, but their single "Follow Me!", became their first single to gain a certification by the Recording Industry Association of Japan (RIAJ)—receiving a double platinum award.

Their debut studio album, Lesson 1, was released in April 2013. After this, E-girls release "Gomennasai no Kissing You", their first single to achieve over 100,000 units in Japan, and was certified platinum for digital sales. Two more singles—"Kurukuru" and "Diamond Only"—was released, and their second album Colorful Pop (2014) premiered not long after. Between July–November 2014, the group released four singles; "E.G. Anthem: We Are Venus", "Odoru Ponpokorin", "Highschool Love", and "Mr. Snowman", the latter two which achieved a gold certification by the RIAJ. Their third album, E.G. Time (2015), garnered success in Japan and was one of the highest earning releases that year.

The band continued to release three more singles in the new year—"Anniversary!!", "Dance Dance Dance", and "Merry x Merry Xmas"—all three that managed to gain commercial success. E.G. Smile: E-girls Best, the group's debut greatest hits compilation, was certified platinum by the RIAJ, but became their first record to miss the top spot on the Oricon Albums Chart. The band decided to release further material based on three concepts; E.G. Pop ("E.G. Summer Rider"), E.G. Cool ("Pink Champagne"), and Japanese Neo Girls ("Go! Go! Let's Go!"), the first two of which charted well on the Oricon Singles Chart. Their fourth record, E.G. Crazy, premiered in January 2017.

== Albums ==
=== Studio albums ===
Title	Album information	Peak chart positions		Sales (Note: Sales are rounded to the nearest thousand.)	Certifications
Title	Album information	JPN Oricon	JPN Billboard (Note: Sources are available here: E.G. Smile: E-girls Best, E.G. Crazy.)	Sales	Certifications
Lesson 1	Released: April 17, 2013 (JPN); Label: Rhythm Zone; Formats: CD, digital download	1	— (Note: The Hot Albums chart was not available until July 2015, hence why the record didn't peak. However, it did reach number one on the Top Album Sales chart.)	JPN: 173,000	RIAJ: Gold
Colorful Pop	Released: March 19, 2014 (JPN); Label: Rhythm Zone; Formats: CD, digital download	1	— (Note: The Hot Albums chart was not available until July 2015, hence why the record didn't peak. However, it did reach number one on the Top Album Sales chart.)	JPN: 170,000	RIAJ: Gold
E.G. Time	Released: January 1, 2015 (JPN); Label: Rhythm Zone; Formats: CD, digital download	1	— (Note: The Hot Albums chart was not available until July 2015, hence why the record didn't peak. However, it did reach number two on the Top Album Sales chart.)	JPN: 273,000	RIAJ: Platinum
E.G. Crazy	Released: January 18, 2017 (JPN); Label: Rhythm Zone; Formats: 2CD, digital download	1	1	JPN: 135,000	RIAJ: Gold
E.G.11	Released: May 23, 2018; Label: Rhythm Zone; Formats: 2CD, digital download	5	4	JPN: 30,000	
"—" denotes releases that did not chart or were not released in that region.

=== Live albums ===
List of live albums with selected chart positions, sales figures and certifications
Title	Album information	Peak chart positions		Sales	Certifications
Title	Album information	JPN Oricon	JPN Billboard	Sales	Certifications
E.G.POWER 2019 ~POWER to the DOME~ at NHK HALL 2019.3.28	Released: September 9, 2020; Label: Rhythm Zone; Formats: digital download	—	87		
E-girls LIVE 2017 ~E.G.EVOLUTION~ at Saitama Super Arena 2017.7.16	Released: November 25, 2020; Label: Rhythm Zone; Formats: digital download	—	—		
E-girls LIVE TOUR 2018 ~E.G. 11~ at Saitama Super Arena 2018.8.5	Released: November 25, 2020; Label: Rhythm Zone; Formats: digital download	—	—		
LIVE×ONLINE BEYOND THE BORDER (Live at Ariake Arena 2020.12.28)	Released: April 21, 2021; Label: Rhythm Zone; Formats: digital download	—	— (Note: "LIVE×ONLINE BEYOND THE BORDER (Live at Ariake Arena 2020.12.28)" did not enter Billboard Japan Hot Albums Chart, but peaked at position 38 on the component Billboard Japan Download Albums Chart.)		
"—" denotes releases that did not chart or were not released in that region.

=== Compilation albums ===
List of compilation albums with selected chart positions, sales figures and certifications
Title	Album information	Peak chart positions		Sales	Certifications
Title	Album information	JPN Oricon	JPN Billboard	Sales	Certifications
E.G. Smile: E-girls Best	Released: February 10, 2016 (JPN); Label: Rhythm Zone; Formats: 2CD, digital download	2	2	JPN: 295,000	RIAJ: Platinum
E-girls a-nation 2018 SET LIST	Released: August 19, 2018; Label: Rhythm Zone; Formats: digital download	—	—		
E-girls LIVE TOUR 2018 -E.G.11- SET LIST	Released: August 19, 2018; Label: Rhythm Zone; Formats: digital download	—	—		
E-girls	Released: December 28, 2020; Label: Rhythm Zone; Formats: 2CD, 3CD, digital download	7	3	JPN: 24,000	
"—" denotes releases that did not chart or were not released in that region.

=== Remix albums ===
List of remix albums with selected chart positions, sales figures and certifications
Title	Album information	Peak chart positions		Sales	Certifications
Title	Album information	JPN Oricon	JPN Billboard	Sales	Certifications
“E.G. TIME” non-stop mix Mixed by DJ Erie	Released: December 24, 2014; Label: Rhythm Zone; Formats: CD (rental only)	—	—		
E.G. SUMMER MIX 2020	Released: August 5, 2020; Label: Rhythm Zone; Formats: digital download	—	30		
E.G. SUMMER MIX 2020 (Instrumental)	Released: August 5, 2020; Label: Rhythm Zone; Formats: digital download	—	—		
"—" denotes releases that did not chart or were not released in that region.

=== Video albums ===
List of video/live albums with selected chart positions, sales figures and certifications
Title	Album information	Peak chart positions		Sales	Certifications
Title	Album information	JPN Oricon	JPN Billboard	Sales	Certifications
E-girls Live Tour 2014: Colorful Land	Released: January 1, 2015 (JPN); Label: Rhythm Zone; Formats: DVD	1	—		RIAJ: Platinum
E-girls Live Tour 2015: Colorful World	Released: February 10, 2016 (JPN); Label: Rhythm Zone; Formats: DVD	2	2		RIAJ: Platinum
E-girls Live Tour 2016: E.G. Smile	Released: January 18, 2017 (JPN); Label: Rhythm Zone; Formats: DVD	1	1		
E-girls LIVE 2017 - E.G.EVOLUTION -	Released: December 28, 2017 (JPN); Label: Rhythm Zone; Formats: DVD, Blu-ray	1	—		
E-girls LIVE 2018 - E.G.11 -	Released: January 16, 2019 (JPN); Label: Rhythm Zone; Formats: DVD, Blu-ray	1	—		
E-girls POWER 2019 - POWER to the DOME-	Released: July 24, 2019 (JPN); Label: Rhythm Zone; Formats: DVD, Blu-ray	2	—		
LIVE×ONLINE BEYOND THE BORDER	Released: April 21, 2021 (JPN); Label: Rhythm Zone; Formats: DVD, Blu-ray	3	—		
"—" denotes releases that did not chart or were not released in that region.

== Singles ==
=== Lead singles ===
List of singles, with selected chart positions
Title	Year	Peak chart positions		Sales (JPN)	Certifications	Album
Title	Year	JPN Oricon	JPN Billboard (Note: Sources are available here: "Celebration!", "One Two Three!", "Follow Me", "The Never Ending Story", "Candy Smile", "Gomennasai no Kissing You", "Kurukuru", "E.G. Anthem: We Are Venus", "Highschool Love", "Mr. Snowman", "Anniversary!!", "Dance Dance Dance", "Merry x Merry Xmas", "E.G. Summer Rider", "Pink Champagne", "Go! Go! Let's Go!",)	Sales (JPN)	Certifications	Album
"Celebration!"	2011	7	39	27,000		Lesson 1
"One Two Three!"	2012	12	10	23,000		Lesson 1
"Follow Me"	2012	2	2	47,000	RIAJ (digital): 2× Platinum	Lesson 1
"The Never Ending Story"	2013	2	5	49,000		Lesson 1
"Candy Smile"	2013	6	13	40,000	RIAJ (digital): Gold	Lesson 1
"Gomennasai no Kissing You"	2013	2	3	103,000	RIAJ (digital): 2× Platinum	Colorful Pop
"Kurukuru"	2013	2	3	79,000		Colorful Pop
"Diamond Only"	2014	2	8	77,000		Colorful Pop
"E.G. Anthem: We Are Venus"	2014	2	8	61,000	RIAJ (digital): Gold	E.G. Time
"Odoru Ponpokorin"	2014	5	9	41,000		E.G. Time
"Highschool Love"	2014	2	4	73,000	RIAJ (digital): Gold	E.G. Time
"Mr. Snowman"	2014	2	3	55,000	RIAJ (digital): Gold	E.G. Time
"Anniversary"	2015	3	3	54,000	RIAJ (digital): Gold	E.G. Smile: E-girls Best / E.G. Crazy
"Dance Dance Dance"	2015	4	3	58,000	RIAJ (digital): Gold	E.G. Smile: E-girls Best / E.G. Crazy
"Merry x Merry Xmas"	2015	4	2	35,000		E.G. Smile: E-girls Best / E.G. Crazy
"E.G. Summer Rider"	2016	2	2	68,000		E.G. Crazy
"Pink Champagne"	2016	2	2	72,000	RIAJ (physical): Gold	E.G. Crazy
"Go! Go! Let's Go!"	2016	2	5	29,000		E.G. Crazy
"Love Queen"	2017	4	3	77,000		E.G.11
"Kitakaze to Taiyou"	2017	4	5	39,000		E.G.11
"Aishiteru to Itte Yokatta"	2018	5				E.G.11
"Pain, pain"	2018	6		25,000		E.G.11
"Cinderella Fit"	2019	10	—	14,000		E-girls
"Bessekai"	2020	3	—	27,000		E-girls
"—" denotes releases that did not chart or were not released in that region.

=== Promotional singles ===
List of singles, with selected chart positions
Title	Year	Peak chart positions		Certifications	Album
Title	Year	JPN Oricon	JPN Billboard (Note: Sources are available here: "Rydeen (Dance All Night)", "Ureshii! Tanoshii! Daisuki!", "Jiyou no Megami (Yuvuraia)" "Dance With Me Now!" "All Day Long Lady")	Certifications	Album
"Just in Love"	2012	—	—		Lesson 1
"Rydeen: Dance All Night"	2014	—	34		Colorful Pop
"A.S.A.P"	2014	—	—		Colorful Pop
"Ureshii! Tanoshii! Daisuki!"	2014	—	99		E.G. Time
"Music Flyer"	2015	–	–		E.G. Time
"Move It! (Dream & E-girls Time)"	2015	—	—		E.G. Time
"Rock 'n' Roll Widow"	2015	—	—		E.G. Time
"Jiyou no Megami (Yuvuraia)"	2015	—	44		E.G. Time
"Dance with Me Now!"	2016	—	10		E.G. Smile: E-girls Best / E.G. Crazy
"All Day Long Lady"	2017	—	26		'E.G. Crazy
"Harajuku Time Bomb"	2017	—	—		'E.G. Crazy
"So many stars"	2020	—	—		E-girls
"—" denotes releases that did not chart or were not released in that region.

=== Guest appearances ===
List of non-single guest appearances, with other performing artists, showing year released and album name
Title	Year	Other artist(s)	Album
"I Should Be So Lucky"	2014	DJ Makidai	Exile Tribe Perfect Remix
"Strawberry Sadistic"	2016	—N/a	High & Low: Original Best Album

== Music videos ==
=== Official videos ===
List of music videos, with directors, showing year released
Year	Title	Director
2011	"Celebration!"	Shigeaki Kubo
2012	"One Two Three!"	Shigeaki Kubo
2012	"E-girls Anthem: Live at the 2011 Exile Tour"	Shigeaki Kubo
2012	"Follow Me"	Shigeaki Kubo
2012	"Just in Love"	Shigeaki Kubo
2013	"The Never Ending Story"	Shigeaki Kubo
2013	"Candy Smile"	Shigeaki Kubo
2013	"Gomennasai no Kissing You"	Shigeaki Kubo
2013	"Kurukuru"	Shigeaki Kubo
2014	"Diamond Only"	Shigeaki Kubo
2014	"Gomennasai no Kissing You (Shazai no Osama bonus clip)"	Shigeaki Kubo
2014	"Rydeen (Dance All Night)"	Shigeaki Kubo
2014	"E.G. Anthem: We Are Venus"	Shigeaki Kubo
2014	"Odoru Ponpokorin"	Shigeaki Kubo
2014	"Odoru Ponpokorin" (Animation clip)	Unknown
2014	"Highschool Love"	Kubo
2014	"Mr. Snowman"	Kubo
2014	"Move It! (Dream & E-girls Time)"	Kubo
2015	"Anniversary"	Yu-ya Hara
2015	"Dance Dance Dance"	Kanji Sato
2015	"Merry x Merry Xmas"	Seki Ayano
2015	"Dance With Me Now!"	Seki Ayano
2016	"Strawberry Sadistic"	Kubo
2016	"E.G. Summer Rider"	Kubo
2016	"Pink Champagne"	Kubo
2016	"Go! Go! Let's Go!"	Daisuke Ninomaya
2016	"All Day Long Lady"	Daisuke Ninomaya
2016	"Harajuku Time Bomb" (Short version)	Daisuke Ninomaya
2017	"Love ☆ Queen"	Daisuke Ninomaya
2017	Smile For me	Unknown
2017	"Kitakaze to Taiyou"	Unknown
2018	"Aishiteru to Itte Yokatta"	Nakajima Tetsuya
2018	Pain, pain	Ayano
2018	"Y.M.C.A. (E-girls version)"	Kubo
2018	"Show Time"	Kubo
2018	"My Way"	Unknown
2018	"Let's Feel High'"	Unknown
2018	"Perfect World"	Mitsuishi Naokazu
2018	"Perfect World (Lyric Video)"	Unknown
2018	"EG-ENERGY"	Ninomiya
2019	"CINDERELLA FIT (Dance Practice Video)"	Unknown
2019	"CINDERELLA FIT"	Kubo
2020	"Bessekai"	Ninomiya
2020	"So many stars"	Kubo, Ayano
2020	"eleven(Lyric Video)"	Unknown

=== Seifuku dance videos ===
List of dance–performed music videos, with directors, showing year released
Title	Year	Director	Selected members
"One Two Three"	2012	Shigeaki Kubo	List: Sayaka; Karen Fujii; Kaede; Miyuu; Yurino; Mayu Sugieda; Erina Mizuno; Shuuka Fujii; Manami Shigetome; Mio Nakajima; Reina Washio; Chiharu Muto; Kyoka Ichiki; Nozomi Bando; Harumi Sato; Anna Suda; Reina Kizu
"Follow Me"	2012	Shigeaki Kubo	List: Sayaka; Karen Fujii; Kaede; Miyuu; Yurino; Shuuka Fujii; Manami Shigetome; Mio Nakajima; Nozomi Bando; Harumi Sato; Kyoka Takeda; Miyuu Oshii; Misato Hagio; Rio Inagaki; Anna Ishii; Nonoka Yamaguchi; Yuzuna Takebe; Anna Suda; Reina Kizu
"The Never Ending Story"	2013	Shigeaki Kubo	List: Sayaka; Karen Fujii; Kaede; Miyuu; Yurino; Shuuka Fujii; Manami Shigetome; Mio Nakajima; Kyoka Ichiki; Nozomi Bando; Harumi Sato; Kyoka Takeda; Miyuu Oshii; Misato Hagio; Rio Inagaki; Anna Ishii; Nonoka Yamaguchi; Anna Suda; Reina Kizu
"Candy Smile	2013	Shigeaki Kubo	List: Erie Abe; Sayaka; Karen Fujii; Kaede; Miyuu; Yurino; Anna Suda; Ruri Kawamoto; Shuuka Fujii; Harumi Sato; Kyoka Takeda; Miyuu Oshii; Misato Hagio; Momoka Nakajima; Rio Inagaki; Anna Ishii; Nonoka Yamaguchi; Yuzuna Takebe
"Gomenassai no Kissing You"	2013	Shigeaki Kubo	List: Sayaka; Karen Fujii; Kaede; Miyuu; Yurino; Anna Suda; Erina Mizuno; Shuuka Fujii; Manami Shigetome; Mio Nakajima; Kyoka Ichiki; Nozomi Bando; Harumi Sato; Kyoka Takeda; Miyuu Oshii; Misato Hagio; Rio Inagaki; Anna Ishii; Nonoka Yamaguchi
"Kurukuru"	2013	Shigeaki Kubo	List: Sayaka; Karen Fujii; Kaede; Miyuu; Yurino; Anna Suda; Shuuka Fujii; Manami Shigetome; Mio Nakajima; Kyoka Ichiki; Nozomi Bando; Harumi Sato; Risa Ikuta; Marina Watanabe
"E.G. Anthem: We Are Venus"	2014	Shigeaki Kubo	List: Sayaka; Karen Fujii; Kaede; Miyuu; Yurino; Shuuka Fujii; Manami Shigetome; Mio Nakajima; Kyoka Ichiki; Harumi Sato
"Diamond Only"	2014	Shigeaki Kubo	List: Sayaka; Karen Fujii; Kaede; Miyuu; Yurino; Anna Suda; Shuuka Fujii; Manami Shigetome; Mio Nakajima; Kyoka Ichiki; Nozomi Bando; Harumi Sato; Yuzuna Takebe; Kyoka Takeda; Misato Hagio; Anna Ishii; Nonoka Yamaguchi; Risa Ikuta; Momoka Nakajima; Marina Watanabe
"Odoru Ponpokorin"	2014	Shigeaki Kubo	List: Sayaka; Karen Fujii; Kaede; Miyuu; Yurino; Anna Suda; Shuuka Fujii; Manami Shigetome; Mio Nakajima; Kyoka Ichiki; Nozomi Bando; Harumi Sato; Anna Ishii; Nonoka Yamaguchi; Yuzuna Takebe
"Highschool Love"	2014	Shigeaki Kubo	List: Sayaka; Karen Fujii; Kaede; Miyuu; Yurino; Anna Suda; Shuuka Fujii; Manami Shigetome; Mio Nakajima; Kyoka Ichiki; Nozomi Bando; Harumi Sato; Yuzuna Takebe; Kyoka Takeda; Misato Hagio; Anna Ishii; Nonoka Yamaguchi; Risa Ikuta; Momoka Nakajima
"Mr. Snowman"	2014	Shigeaki Kubo	List: Sayaka; Karen Fujii; Kaede; Miyuu; Yurino; Anna Suda; Shuuka Fujii; Nozomi Bando; Harumi Sato; Anna Ishii
