= Harumi Sato =

Japanese dancer, model and actress (born 1995)

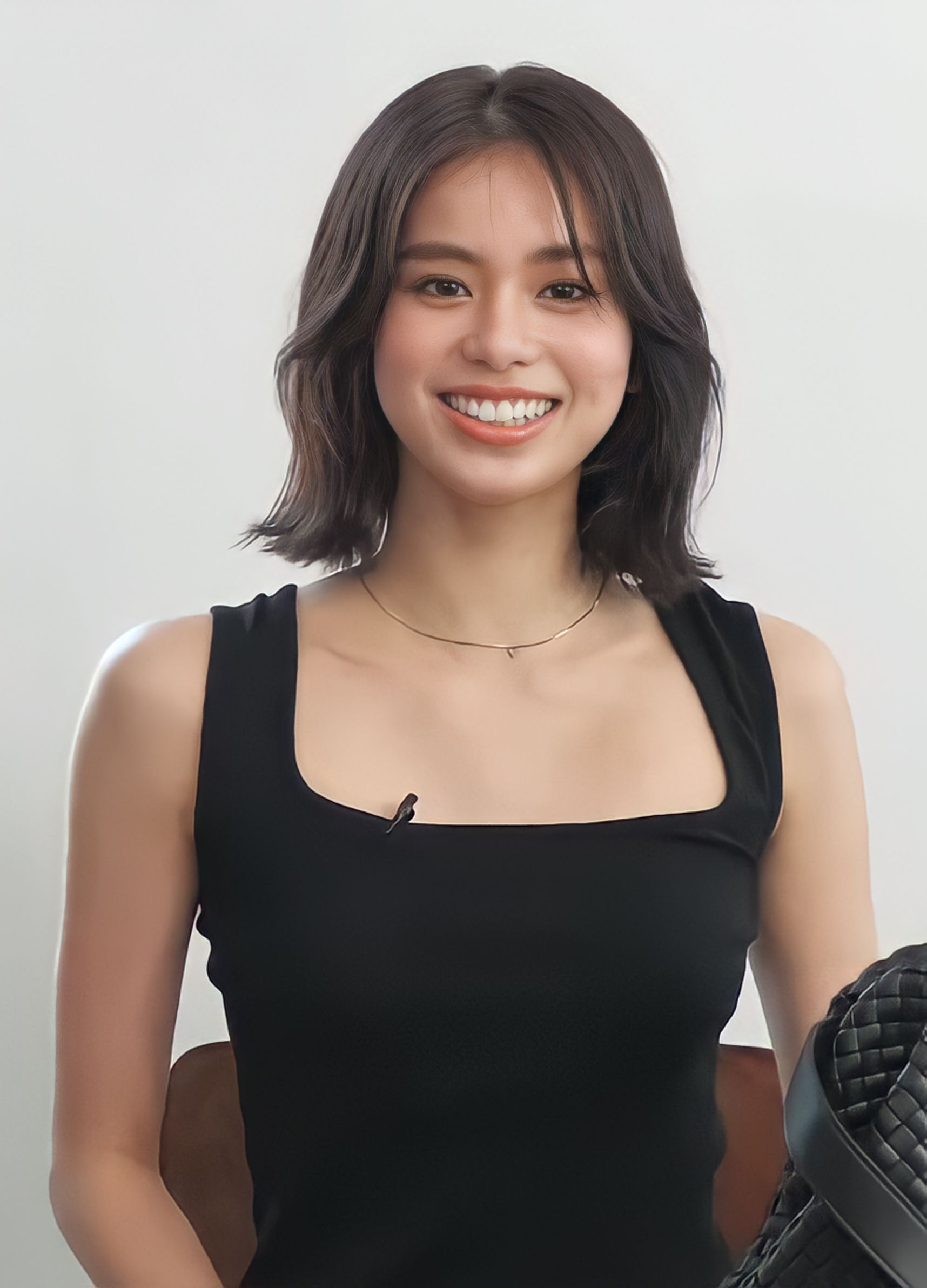
- Sato in July 2023
- Born: 8 June 1995 (age 30); Tendō City, Yamagata Prefecture, Japan
- Occupations: Dancer; model; actress
- Years active: 2011–present
- Agent: LDH
- Height: 173 cm (5 ft 8 in)
- Musical career
- Genres: J-pop
- Label: Rhythm Zone
- Formerly of: Flower; E-girls

Japanese name
- Kanji: 佐藤晴美
- Hiragana: さとう はるみ
- Romanization: Sato Harumi

Harumi Sato (佐藤 晴美, Satō Harumi; born June 8, 1995) is a Japanese dancer, model, and actress. She is a former member of J-Pop group E-girls and Flower and exclusive model for the Japanese fashion magazine Ray. Sato is represented by LDH.

== Early life ==
Harumi Sato was born on June 8, 1995, in Tendō City, Yamagata Prefecture, Japan. She has an elder brother and sister. Prior to auditioning to LDH, Sato took dance classes at Dance Studio MPF from the second grade of elementary school to second grade of junior high school. Afterwards, she was a student at Dance Studio ViVid in Fukushima Prefecture.

== Career ==
On July 26, 2011, it was revealed during an E-Girls Show event at Shibuya-AX that Sato was one of the winners in the dance section of the Vocal Battle Audition 3 and thus would be added to Flower as a performer alongside Nozomi Bando. On the same day, she was also added as a performer of E-girls, being a member of both groups at the same time. On October 12, Flower debuted with the single "Still".

In March 2012, Sato made her modeling debut by participating in the Tokyo Girls Collection.

On July 22, 2013, it was announced that she would be working as an exclusive model of the fashion magazine Ray starting from its September issue.

In January 2014, she debuted as an actress in the TV drama A Perfect Day for Love Letters.

In January 2017, she appeared on the cover of Ray's March issue, being her first solo magazine cover in her career as a model. On August 29 in the same year, she released her first photobook titled harumiiro (ハルミイロ). Furthermore, Sato was appointed as E-girls' leader in late October after the group's reformulation.

On August 3, 2018, she participated as a special performer in the Dance Alive World Cup 2018 at Saitama Super Arena. There, she performed together with Fabulous Sisters, a dance team of her former dance school Dance Studio ViVid.

On September 6, 2019, she was invited to attend the runway show of the Tommy Hilfiger x Zendaya collection during New York Fashion Week, being her first international fashion event. On September 30, Flower disbanded and Sato remained as member of E-girls. On December 22, with the announcement of E-girls' disbandment set for around the end of 2020, it was revealed that she would focus on acting and modeling activities afterwards.

=== Twin Tower ===
Sato is the tallest member of Flower and E-girls (173 cm; 5 ft 8 in). Together with Kaede, second tallest E-girls member and tallest member of Happiness (168 cm; 5 ft 6 in), she forms the model duo Twin Tower. The duo started as a nickname from fans but became official soon after. Together, they have appeared in several magazines and commercials such as GQ Japan, CanCam, and Vogue Girl.

== Filmography ==
=== Films ===
Year	Title	Role	Ref.
2016	Road to High & Low	Oshiage	
2016	High & Low: The Movie	Oshiage	
2017	High&Low The Movie 2 / End of Sky	Oshiage	
2017	High&Low The Movie 3 / Final Mission	Oshiage	
2022	Wedding High	Sawa Yamashita	

=== TV dramas ===
Year	Title	Role	Network	Notes	Ref.
2014	A Perfect Day for Love Letters / Koibumi Biyori	Kyoko Wada	NTV	Episode 8; Lead role	
2015	High & Low: The Story Of S.W.O.R.D	Oshiage	NTV		
2016	High & Low Season 2	Oshiage	NTV		
2019	Busu no Hitomi ni Koishiteru 2019	Yuka Hanayama	FOD	Web drama	
2020	Marry Me!	Waka Yoshiura	TV Asahi-ABC		

=== Stage ===
Year	Title	Ref.
2019	Honan Gumi Reading Play "Aozora"	
2020	Book Act "Entertainer Exchange Diary / Geinin Kokan Nikki"	

=== Commercials ===
Year	Title	Notes	Ref.
2017	& chouette	Filmed with other E-girls members. Directed by Nicola Formichetti	
2018	Kosé "Fashio"	Filmed with Kaede	
2019	Mister Donut "Tap! Tap! Tapioca!"	Filmed with other E-girls members	
2019	Mister Donut "Cotton Snow Candy"	Filmed with other E-girls members	
2019	Yofuku no Aoyama	Filmed with other E-girls members	
