= Redrum (band) =

Japanese indie rock band

- Origin: Japan
- Genres: Indie rock, trip hop
- Years active: 1996–2006, 2007–2009, 2015
- Labels: Embryo Records (1998-2000); Night People (2001-2009)
- Members: Hiroshi Soto; Kitayama Yumi; Kazihara Kouji; Takeuchi Tsuyoshi

Redrum (often stylized as REDЯUM) is a Japanese indie rock band who formed in 1996 with the decisive goal of becoming a band similar to Portishead for Japan. The members of the band are Yumi (vocals), Tsuyoshi (guitar) and Kazi (drums). The role of bassist officially changed two times and was helmed primarily by Soto who joined the band early on and stayed until his departure in December 2004. Their catalogue of works consists of only a few proper albums, several mini albums and maxi singles. Some of their releases were available exclusively through mail order or at their shows and have since become out of print.

In April 2006 the band announced that they would be going on an indefinite hiatus after they finished their 10th anniversary tour which ended in June. Kazi stressed that this was not a break-up and that all band members vowed to return in the future. In March 2007 the band followed through with their word and announced their comeback live which is to take place on April 22, 2007. With this announcement came the news that long-standing bassist Soto would rejoin the band after having left in late 2004. They released a "best of" album on November 19, 2008 entitled Cinematic Sound Foundation and followed up with an announcement of the band's disbandment. Yumi decided to retire from music and after a discussion with the band it was decided that Redrum could no longer exist without her or with a replacement singer. Kazi has stated that he, Tsuyoshi and Soto would eventually perform together in some capacity. The band embarked on their last tour entitled "Tomorrow Never Comes" and their final live took place on April 25, 2009 at Shinjuku Loft.

== Name and themes ==
The band's name comes most notably from Stephen King's The Shining and is the reverse of the word 'murder'. Redrum songs have the occasional line played in reverse which could take homage to their namesake but more than likely pay respect to the red room sequences in Twin Peaks, David Lynch's television series involving strange happenings related to a small town murder. The band's, and specifically Kazi's, appreciation of the works of both David Lynch and David Cronenberg are referenced thematically through many songs.

== Inspirations ==
Musically speaking, the band takes inspiration from such Western acts as Red Hot Chili Peppers, John Frusciante, Radiohead, Portishead, Massive Attack, Aphex Twin and Björk to name a few. Locally they have taken cues from contemporaries on the indie scene like honeydip, The Back Horn, nil, Cock Roach, Anoyo, and Durga, as well 1980's groups such as Gastunk, The Blue Hearts, ARB, The Roosters and The Stalin.

== History ==
=== Formation ===
Redrum is a four-piece band that was started with the notion of "making Japan's very own Portishead-like band". In 1996, drummer Kazihara Kouji, stagename Kazi, made this declaration to guitarist Takeuchi Tsuyoshi, whom he had met at a former job and soon after became acquainted with vocalist Kitayama Yumi and the three started Redrum to fulfill that goal.

Their first bassist Jyunji was unreliable during their first year as Redrum and became unreachable for a week or two at a time and would nonchalantly tell his bandmates that he was 'busy'. He was soon after kicked out of the band and a bulletin at live houses and in magazines was posted looking for a new bassist:

"Bassist Urgently Needed! For a Vocalist (22), Guitarist (24), and Drummer (23). To make a band in the likes of Portishead, Massive Attack, Tricky, the Bristol sound of music, and even Radiohead and Björk, in Japanese with such a raw sound!"

Soto Hiroshi responded to the advertisement and band leader Kazi was initially skeptical that this 30-year-old salary man would fit in with the band whose members were barely in their mid-20s. Soto also had different musical tastes than the rest of the band and this brought some hesitation with the band. But after meeting with Soto, they extended the invitation for him to join the band which he accepted in January 1997. Throughout the year, they performed and rehearsed in the studio, crafting such songs as "Sad Song" (which would later become shinbigan to Paradox's tamashii no hana), Room, Blue Velvet, Cherry Pie, and midori no sabaku to name a few.

=== Embryonic years ===
Their big break came by chance when the members went to a Massive Attack concert at Ebisu Garden Hall in June 1998. Standing outside the live house Kazi noticed a man standing around.

Kazi: Isn't that the guy from Luna Sea?
Yumi: Really?
Tsuyoshi: Yeah, it looks like.
Soto: Hmm, sorry, I don't know.

Kazi who walked around with a demo tape in his pocket at all times mustered up enough courage to approach him. To his surprise, Sugizo was quite sociable and told Kazi to give him his phone number so he could call him about his thoughts on the tape. Eventually Sugizo called and said he had just heard the tape and was surprisingly floored by it and wanted Redrum to be the first band to be signed by his newly formed label Embryo. Kazi immediately called the other band members and they were all surprised considering they were not in the style of 'Visual kei' which Luna Sea was noted for.

They met Sugizo again to formally accept his offer and the band soon went into the studio to record their 1st Maxi Single 'Redrum' with Sugizo as recording engineer, L'Arc-en-Ciel and Buck-Tick's Guitar Technician, and The Star Club's Hiro as Drum Tuner. Eventually The Mad Capsule Markets' engineer Koni-Yang finished the engineering process. After playing the final mix each member of the band was equally floored by the quality of their recording because of the combined efforts of the talented technicians.

== Line-up ==
=== Current ===
- Kitayama Yumi (Vocals)
- Takeuchi Tsuyoshi (Guitars)
- Kouji Kajiwara (Drums)
- Hiroshi Soto (Bass 1997-2004, 2007)

=== Former ===
- Jyunji (Bass 1996)
- Hirabayashi Naoki (Bass 2005)
- Honda Yuuya (Bass 2005-2006)

== Discography ==
=== Albums ===
- Second Circle (2000.04.28 ORA-1018)
- Cronenberg (2001.11.16)
- 4 (2002.12.14)
- Too Young to Fall in Love (2003.06.11 IFRDU-0028)
- Arizona Dream (2003.12.16 IFRDU-0030)
- Shinbigan to Paradox (2004.12.08 IFRDU-0032)

=== Maxi-singles ===
- Redrum (1999.05.26)
- Answer Songs (2004.09.08 IFRDU-0031)

=== Singles ===
- Touen no chikai | 2004.12.16
- Cherry Pie 2005ver. | 2005.09.03
- Utskushii kaze | 2005.10.23
- Jellico | 2005.12.03
- Bessekai | 2006.01.29
- Himitsu | 2006.02.25
- Tokyo | 2007.10.31
- Order from 1996 | 2009.04.15

=== Compilations ===
- Grand Cross 1999 | 1999.08.11 (POCH-1818)
  - Contributed the song 'Namida'
- Parallel Side of Soundtract (2001.11.14 HDCA-10075)
  - Contributed the song 'Q'
- Mad for Sadness (2006.05.06)
- Search out the Jams: The Pogo Tribute Album (2008.10.08 THCA-064 )
  - Contributed a cover of the song 'Fallen Angel'
- Cinematic Sound Foundation (2008.11.19 FECD-0098)

=== Live albums ===
- Good Evening Wonderful Friends (2005.02.10)
- 070422 (2007.07.22)
- Sad Song Classics (2008.02.01)

=== Live-only or mail-order CDs ===
- New Album (4) Release Party! (2002.12.14)
- Durga + Redrum remix CD (2006.02.25)
- Snow Bird (2009.05.28) released with first-press [Party Is Over] DVD

=== Video ===
- Broken Jr. (2002.07.26)
- Car's Crash (2002.08.15)
- Sentimental Journey (2002.08.23)
- Altered Stasis (2003.12.26)
- Live in Hong Kong: 2001.09.20 @ Queen Elizabeth Stadium (2004.08.29)
- End of Dogma (2006.06.11)
- Sad Song Classics (2008.02.01)
- Party is Over (2009.05.28)
- Last Utopia Under the Rain (2009.07.20)

== Guest appearances ==
Band - Album - Song Title | Role

=== Yumi ===
- Honeydip - Another Sunny Day - Summer's Gone: Second Season ver. | Backing vocals
- Nil - Excalibur - Neon | Backing vocals
- Nil - Excalibur - Nightpeople | Backing vocals
- Tron - Tronique - Depeche | Backing vocals
- Tron - Tronique - Z Sputnik | Backing vocals
- Tron - Tronique - ZZ Sputnik | Backing vocals

=== Kazi ===
- Sugizo - v.a. Grand Cross 1999 - Aquarius after le Fou | Drums
- Nil - Excalibur - Nightpeople | Backing vocals
- About Tess - Swan Song - Studio tracks | Drums
- Soft Ballet - Menopause - tsuchi sagari | Drums

=== Tsuoyshi ===
- Nil - Excalibur - Nightpeople | Backing vocals
- Soft Ballet - Menopause - tsuchi sagari | Guitar
- Suilen - Neoharamu - hiruma | Guitar
- Mobile Suit Gundam 00 Voice Actor Single 2 - Answer | Song Composition

=== Soto ===
- About Tess - Swan Song - All tracks | Bass
- Soft Ballet - Menopause - tsuchi sagari | Bass
