= E-girls =

Japanese girl group

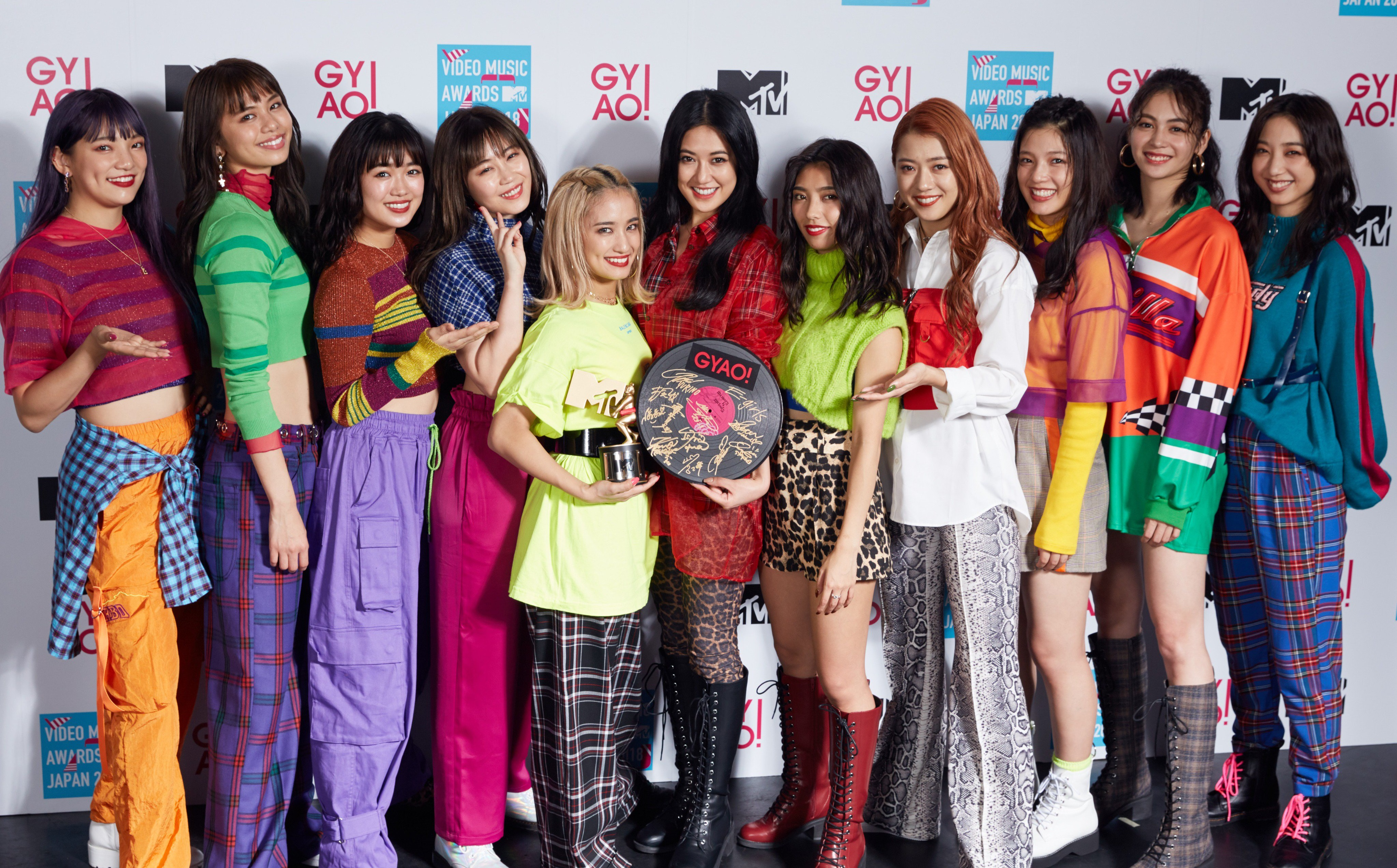
- E-girls at the 2018 MTV Video Music Awards Japan From left to right: Anna Suda, Harumi Sato, Nonoka Yamaguchi, Reina Washio, Yurino, Karen Fujii, Sayaka, Yuzuna Takebe, Anna Ishii, Kaede, Nozomi Bando

Background information
- Also known as: Exile Girls; e-girls
- Origin: Japanese
- Genres: J-pop; EDM
- Years active: 2011–2020
- Labels: LDH, Rhythm Zone
- Members: Reina Washio; Karen Fujii; Yuzuna Takebe; Sayaka; Kaede; Yurino; Anna Suda; Nozomi Bando; Harumi Sato; Anna Ishii; Nonoka Yamaguchi
- Website: e-girls-ldh.jp

E-girls (sometimes stylized as E-Girls or e-girls; stands for Exile Girls) was a Japanese collective girl group created and managed by LDH while signed to music label Rhythm Zone from Avex. As of 2017, the band consisted of 11 members; 8 of which featured members of groups Happiness and Flower. Created as a sister act to boy band Exile, E-girls debuted in 2011 with their single "Celebration". After a string of promotional recordings, E-girls released their debut record Lesson 1 two years later. In 2013, their single "Gomennasai no Kissing You" catapulted the girls into commercial success, selling over 100,000 units, and its parent album Colorful Pop (2014), was met with positive reviews and high performance on the Oricon Albums Chart.

With several members departing from the group, E-girls released their third album E.G. Time (2015), which saw a change in their music and vocal deliveries. That same year, LDH announced changes to their line-up, which resulted in the absence of some members from their singles "Anniversary!!" and "Dance Dance Dance". Beginning the year with their greatest hits album E.G. Smile: E-girls Best (2016), the group announced their E.G. Pop and E.G. Cool themes with the singles "E.G. Summer Rider", "Pink Champagne" and "Go! Go! Let's Go!". Their fourth album, E.G. Crazy, was released in January 2017.

Beginning as a Japanese idol group, E-girls have branched out and conceive a variety of different appeals and cultures as their career progressed, and have become one of the most prominent girl groups in Japanese music. Additionally, their musical style, starting off as soft J-pop and dance music, began to expand as following albums were released. Since their debut, three sub-units have been formed by selected members from E-girls, and have explored both music and fashion endeavours. The group disbanded at the end of 2020.

== History ==
=== 2011–2012: Debut and single releases ===
In 2011, Japanese boy band Exile held a nationwide audition event for young female artists. Originally, the event was to find members for the dance group named Flower, which was conducted by LDH and already featured four members, but they decided to also scope for a new dance and vocal group titled Bunny. After recruiting dancers Nozomi Bando and Harumi Sato, and three vocalists Reina Washio, Kyoka Ichiki, and Chiharu Muto, Exile's Hiro—the head producer and CEO of LDH—announced the "Girls Entertainment Project", which was later changed to E-Girls; he confirmed that it would consist of all members from Dream, Happiness, and Flower. Bunny were not originally formed as part of E-Girls, and were to debut separately in 2013, but they never carried out any activities. Following their formation, E-girls consisted of 21 members. On 28 December 2011, the group debuted with their single "Celebration", which peaked inside the top ten on the Oricon Singles Chart. Sayaka Yamamoto became the first member of E-girls to leave the group, and subsequently her band Dream; her promise commenced in March 2012.

The following year, they released their second single "One Two Three" in April, which performed moderately on the charts than their former recording. For the release, two new members were added into the band: Reina Kizu and Anna Suda, both coming from EGD (EXPG Girls Dancers), a dance group formed at the Exile Professional Gym Academy. On 25 April, E-girls were invited to perform their new single at MCountdown Hello Japan ～MCountdown One Asia Tour 2012～, a live event at Saitama Super Arena hosted by the Korean music program MCountdown. Before the preparation of their follow-up number "Follow Me", Happiness member Mayu Sugieda went on hiatus in August to undergo medical treatment after being diagnosed with infectious mononucleosis. Furthermore, LDH added several more members into E-girls, including the girls from the un-debuted Bunny group and EGD dancers. In total, E-girls consisted of 31 members, with Dream's Sayaka Yamamato, and Happiness' Mimu Hioki and Sugeida on hiatus. Having said this, LDH announced new regulations to have each member train to each following single release in order to feature in the line-up; for example, only 16 of the 31 members appeared on the jacket covers for "Follow Me". The single was released on in October 2012, and was a commercial success in Japan, shifting 500,000 digital units. Not long after, Happiness member Mimu Hioki left the group in October.

=== 2013: Lesson 1 and rise of popularity ===
In early 2013, three members from Bunny left E-Girls. Additionally, EGD member Ruri Kawamoto and an original performer named Momoka Nakajima joined E-Girls and made their first performing appearance in their single "The Never Ending Story", which the band's name de-capitalized to E-girls. It was a commercial success, reaching number two on the Oricon chart, and became their first feature to included all 29-members on the jacket covers. The following hit, "Candy Smile", performed moderately on the charts but earned a Gold certification by the Recording Industry Association of Japan (RIAJ). Additionally, Kawamoto was promoted as a vocalist and sang the B-side "Love Letter", marking her the first E-girls member to change positions. On 17 April, the girls promoted their debut record Lesson 1, which sold numerous units on the Oricon Albums Chart, debuting at number one and charted over 70 non-consecutive weeks. This was the final effort by EGD member Reina Kizu, whom left the group some months later; her position was replaced officially by Nakajima.

Happiness' member Mayu Sugieda returned to the group after recovering from her illness, and joined all 29 members for the single's jacket covers and visual for "Gomennasai no Kissing You". This was the final single with Flower member Elina Mizuno, the first release with Anna Suda and Kawamoto as members of Happiness, and the first visual to feature Nakajima since replacing Kizu. A commercial success, it became the girls first physical track to ship over 100,000 copies, and won the Japanese MTV Video Music Award for Best Choreography, alongside a nomination for Best Japanese act at the 2014 MTV Europe Music Awards. In October that year, EGD member Marina Watanabe joined the girl group as a stand-in performer. However, her position was allocated as a primary performer when member Mizuno signed off from E-girls, and Watanabe was featured in the promotional shoot for the groups following number, "Kurukuru". The single became the group's highest first week sales, shifting approximately 69,087 units. At the end of 2013, the group were given the opportunity to appear on several year-end shows in Japan, and were subsequently invited to Kōhaku Uta Gassen. There, they performed a special medley of their songs.

=== 2014–2015: Individual activities, Colorful Pop, E.G. Time, line-up changes and further work ===
In early 2014, Dream's Aya Takamoto was appointed as the leader of E-girls. Subsequently, each member started to embark on several separate endeavours from the group; 10 of the group's members: Shizuka, Kaede, Karen Fujii, Anna Suda, Shuuka Fujii, Nozomi Bando, Harumi Sato, Kyoka Takeda, Anna Ishii, and Nonoka Yamaguchi, each starred in one episode of the drama A Perfect Day for Love Letters. The opening number to the show was the E-girls single "Diamond Only", which experienced success on the Oricon charts. Despite previous commercial endorsements, it brought the girls more endorsement deals with fashion and lifestyle products. Released as their final single to their second album Colorful Pop, which was released on 19 March, the latter format garnered success on the Oricon Albums Chart and became their second consecutive album to debut at number one. In order to promote the record, E-girls commenced their first national tour between July and August, titled "Colorful Land".

In April that year, Mayu Sugeida and Kyoka Takeda left their respective groups Happiness and Bunny, alongside their departure from E-girls; this made Sugeida the second vocalist after Dream's Sayaka Yamamoto to leave E-girls. From June that year, E-girls released three singles consecutively, one per month; the first was "E.G. Anthem: We Are Venus", which included all members and vocalists on the jacket covers and accompanying music video. The following number was "Odoru Ponpokorin", which premiered on 30 July and experienced moderate sales in the charts and featured 14-elected members for the cover art. It used as the opening theme song to the TV anime Chibi Maruko Chan. The third single from their album E.G. Time (2015) was "Highschool Love", which was released on 10 September. Like "Odoru Ponpokorin", the single was featured in the Fuji TV drama "Great Teacher Onizuka". While preparing for promotion to their single "Mr. Snowman", Flower member and vocalist Chiharu Muto left E-girls to study abroad but ended up launching her own fashion line; she left in November, the same month that the single was released. At the end of the year, E-girls were invited to Kōhaku Uta Gassen for the second time where they performed their song "Highschool Love". They were also part of the line-up for the performers at the FNS Song Festival.

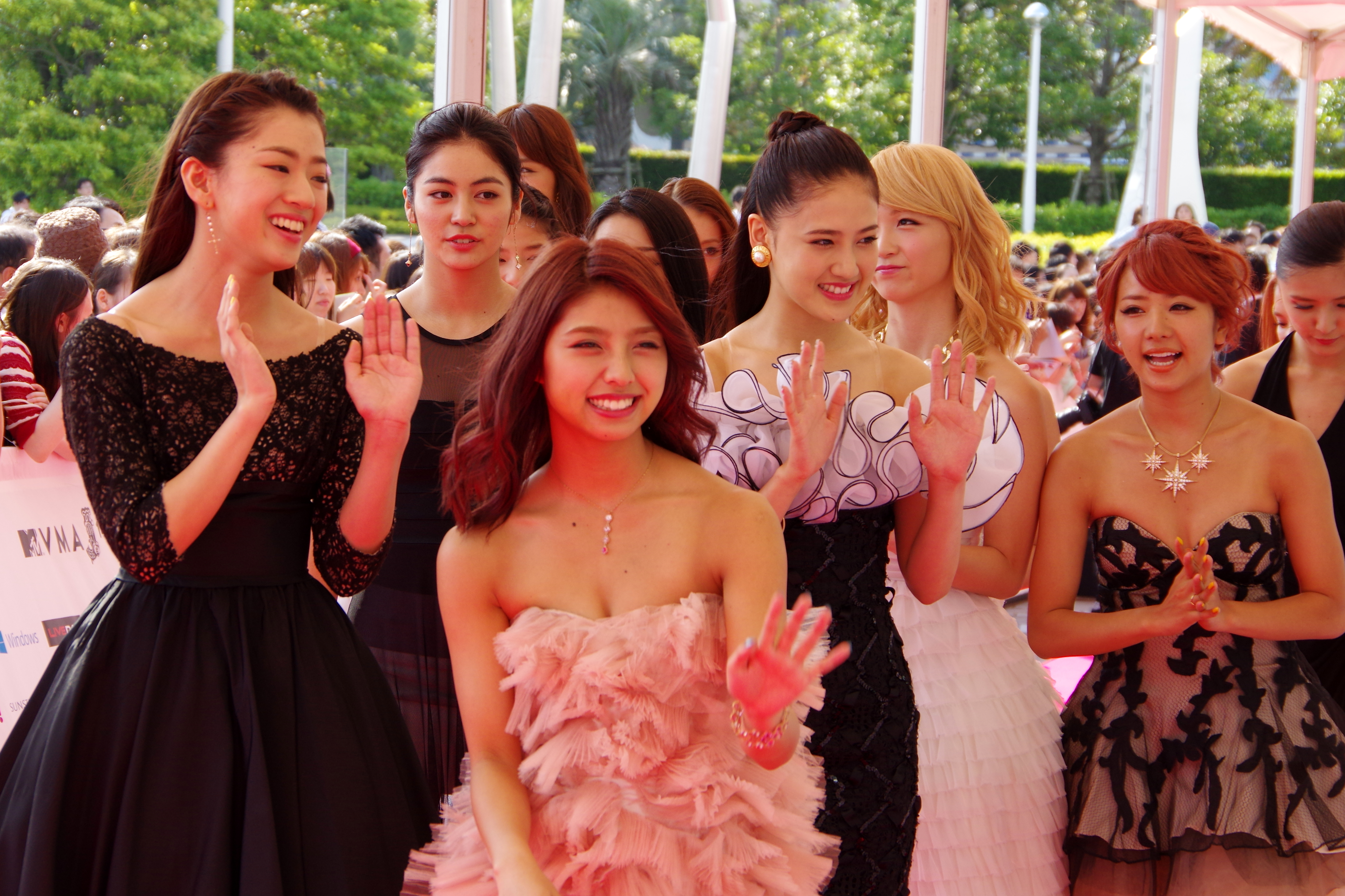
E-girls at the 2014 MTV Video Music Awards Japan

On 1 January 2015 (New Year's Day), the band released the physical editions of E.G. Time. The record was commercially success, becoming their third number one on the Oricon charts. However, on 27 January, the staff at LDH announced a new line-up system titled the E-girls Pyramid, which showed each member in the band and their respective sub-groups. With that said, six of the then-remaining 26 members were moved out of E-girls and into either the yet-to-debut groups Rabbits and Bunnies for further training; Yuzuna Takebe, the youngest singer in E-girls, was removed from the line-up and placed in Rabbits. After this, the girls held their second nationwide tour titled "Colorful World" between February and March. With the new line-up set, E-girls started recording new material for their new album by promoting the single "Anniversary!!". Dream member Ami announced her solo debut, concurring with the activities in E-girls and Dream. In October that year, it was confirmed via LDH that Dream member Erie Abe would graduate from being a performer and singer to become a disc jockey for some of the group's future releases and live performances. That same month, Flower member Kyoka Ichiki announced her departure from both groups; this made Flower a six-member unit, and left Reina Washio the only remaining vocalist in the group.

Because of Ichiki's departure, LDH re-added ex-Rabbits' member Yuzuna Takebe to E-girls, but only attributed as a performer until the following year. Once again, the group was invited to their third appearance at Kōhaku, where they performed their single "Dance Dance Dance" as well as another year-end special on Japan's CDTV where they revealed a new song from their then-upcoming greatest hits album E.G. Smile: E-girls Best, titled "Dance With Me Now!". The single premiered as a promotional recording and achieved success on the Japan Hot 100 chart. It was their last release within 2015.

=== 2016: E.G. Smile: E-girls Best and E.G. Crazy ===
To start the new year 2016, E-girls released their greatest hits compilation album E.G. Smile: E-girls BEST on 10 February 2016. The album consisted of all their singles up to "Dance With Me Now!", and an additional recording titled "Shukko Sa! (Sail Out For Someone)". Released in several different formats, the record became their best-selling album, with over 250,000 units sold and was certified Platinum by the RIAJ. To commemorate its release, E-girls engaged in their third national tour titled E-girls LIVE TOUR 2016 "E.G. SMILE". During the concert tour, the group made several announcements related to their sub-groups' activities; Happiness' second studio album and upcoming tours for both Flower and Happiness. This is the first time Flower and Happiness have been conducted concert tours themselves. Additionally, LDH confirmed the debut of the E-girls side-project ShuuKaRen, which consists of sisters Karen and Shuuka Fujii.

In late April 2016, E-girls confirmed via their website that they would release two new singles, both being part of a Summer Single Concept. The first of these two and their 16th single was "E.G. Summer Rider", which was released on 20 July 2016 with an "E.G. POP" concept. The single debuted at number two on the Oricon chart, and was success with digital sales. The following month, "Pink Champagne" was released on 10 August as their 17th single with an "E.G. COOL" concept and was a critical success. Commercially, it gained their highest-selling first week sales since "Kurukuru" with 66,028 copies.

On 28 October 2016, member Erie Abe announced her intention to retire from the entertainment business at the end of the year, making her the first Dream member to departure since Sayaka Yamamoto's in 2011.

On 30 November, E-girls released their 18th single "Go! Go! Let's Go!". This was yet another change in concept, having embraced a new style called "Japanese Neo Tokyo"; for example, the accompanying visual promoted the girls in various Japanese-influenced fashion. Commercially however, it under-performed and became one of their lowest-selling releases since their debut. The following month, E-girls announced the release of their fourth studio album E.G. Crazy (2017). The record is packaged as a double album; one disc features material for E.G. POP, whilst the second disc deals with an E.G. COOL concept. Additionally, several music videos were featured on the album, including the promotional recordings of "Strawberry Sadistic"—which appeared in the original LDH film High & Low: The Movie—and two new album tracks titled "All Day Long Lady"/"Harajuku Time Bomb".

On 31 December, that year, E-girls performed their song "DANCE WITH ME NOW!" at the 67th Kohaku Uta Gassen after getting invited for the 4th consecutive year. On the same day, Abe committed to her promise and retired from Dream and E-girls.

=== 2017: Reformulation of the group and E.G.family ===
On 3 January 2017, E.G. Crazy premiered on AWA streaming services through Japan, and was subsequently issued with various physical editions on 18 January. On 10 March, dancer and Happiness member/leader Miyuu announced a brief hiatus due to a knee injury that occurred through January that same year. She confirmed that she was in the process of surgery and rehabilitation.

In late May 2017, LDH announced a new campaign titled E.G. Evolution, consisting of a 7-day countdown. After the seven subsequent days, on 5 June, LDH revealed several changes to E-girls. The first was the disbandment of corresponding band Dream, which consisted of members Shizuka, Aya and Ami. All three members confirmed their graduation from E-girls, whilst Aya effectively retired from being a musician and performer indefinitely, in order to serve as the chief creative manager towards the group and the newly established girl entertainment franchise within LDH, E.G.family. Shizuka and Ami would continue with their solo projects as a member of Dance Earth Party and as a soloist respectively. Additionally, members Miyuu, Ruri Kawamoto, Shuuka Fujii, Manami Shigetome and Mio Nakajima removed themselves from the E-girls too, focusing on their activities within their groups Happiness and Flower. According to the girls' website, members Karen Fujii, Reina Washio and Yuzuna Takebe would serve as the band's primary vocalists, and would have no assisting group leader. With the announcement, it was also revealed that the group would be doing a 2-day live concert titled E-girls LIVE 2017 ~E.G.EVOLUTION~. The concerts would be their last as a 19-member lineup since E-girls would promote as 11 members after the reformulation.

On 26 July, the group released their 19th single "Love ☆ Queen", their first official work as an 11-member group. In October, it was announced that Harumi Sato was chosen as the new leader of the group. Later that month, E-girls performed at the TV Asahi Dream Festival 2017 at Saitama Super Arena. On 6 December, the group released their 20th single "Kitakaze to Taiyou". In the same month, on 28 December, the group released the E-girls LIVE 2017 ~E.G.EVOLUTION~ concert on DVD/Blu-ray.

At the end of 2017, E-girls were invited to perform at Kōhaku for the 5th time. There, they performed their song "Love ☆ Queen".

=== 2018: E.G. 11 ===
On 31 January, the group released their 21st single "Aishiteru to Itte Yokatta". Shortly after, they released their 22nd single "Pain, pain" on 28 February.

On 23 May 2018, E-girls released their fifth studio album, E.G.11, their first album as an 11-member group. Additionally, they embarked on their fourth national tour E-girls LIVE TOUR 2018 ~E.G. 11~, that went from 2 June to 5 August. It was the first tour since the group's reformulation.

On 8 August, they released their 5th digital single "My Way", accompanied by a music video for the title song and another music video for the b-side track "Let's Feel High". Both songs feature Mighty Crown and PKCZ®.

The Japanese version of Tomb Raider contains a theme song by the band titled "Dynamite Girl".

On 3 October, E-girls were invited to perform at the Asia Song Festival 2018 in South Korea. On the same day, they released their 6th digital single "Perfect World". The song was used as theme song for the movie Perfect World Kimi to Iru Kiseki, starring Sandaime J Soul Brothers/EXILE member Takanori Iwata.

On 6 October, the Internet program Zenryoku Bukatsu! E-kou (全力部活！E高; All-Out Club Activity! E-high) started airing on AbemaTV. This has been the first regular show focused on E-girls since 2016 and each episode includes new challenges for the group to master.

On 19 December, the group released their 7th digital single "EG-ENERGY". The song was used to promote LDH martial arts' ENERGY PROJECT, alongside Generations from Exile Tribe.

=== 2019–2020: E.G.POWER to the DOME, 3-month release project and final tour ===
On 16 January, the group released the footage of the E-girls LIVE TOUR 2018 ~E.G. 11~ concert at Saitama Super Arena on DVD and Blu-ray.

In the first half of the year, E-girls participated in E.G.family's first tour E.G.POWER 2019 ~POWER to the DOME~ that went from 22 February to 25 May. This tour included performances from all artists belonging to E.G.family: E-girls, Flower, Happiness, SudannaYuzuYully, Dream Ami, Dream Shizuka and E.G.family all together.

On 24 July, they released their 23rd single "CINDERELLA FIT" and the DVD/Blu-ray for 28 March E.G.POWER 2019 ~POWER to the DOME~ concert at NHK Hall. "Cinderella Fit" was used as theme song for Mister Donut's Mister Donut Tapioca Milk TV-CM, which stars members Kaede, Nozomi Bando, Harumi Sato and Nonoka Yamaguchi. The song was pre-available digitally for streaming on 27 June 2019.

On 6 October, AbemaTV broadcast the 47th episode of the program Zenryoku Bukatsu! E-kou (全力部活！E高; All-Out Club Activity! E-high) which revealed that all 11 members of E-girls succeeded in climbing to the summit of Mount Fuji together. Some of them exhibited early signs of altitude sickness as they headed above 3000 meters, but supported each other to their destination. The ascent took over 8 hours and 30 minutes in total.

On 15 October, E-girls won the "Best-Jeanist" award in the "Collector Selection" category at The 36th Best Jeanist Awards 2019 for their denim costumes from "Cinderella Fit". Kaede attended the ceremony as a representative of the group.

On 8 November, it was announced that E-girls would release their 24th single on 29 January 2020, and that there would be a 3-months project prior to the release to pre-deliver a new song each month. The first release of this project would be titled "Easy come, Easy go", scheduled for 22 November and accompanied by a row of release events. The second release would be "CINDERELLA FIT (Winter Version)" on 27 December. It was also revealed that the new single would include 4 new songs in total, with "Bessekai" (別世界; Another World) being the title track.

In late 2019, it was revealed that the group would hold their 5th tour E-girls PERFECT LIVE 2011▶2020 from 1 February – 4 July 2020. On 22 December 2019, the group announced that the tour will be their final activity together and that E-girls will dissolve at the end of 2020. Every member will stay with their original company LDH and follow different career paths. While Harumi Sato, Nozomi Bando, Anna Ishii and Nonoka Yamaguchi will focus on their work as actresses and models, Yuzuna Takebe will form a new unit with the successful contestants that passed Afrojack's LDH Europe audition, Reina Washio will debut as a solo artist and Happiness will work with 88rising for global expansion.

Due to the consequences of the COVID-19 pandemic in 2020, several concerts of E-girls' last tour had to be cancelled or postponed. As a reparation, the group held a live event with no audience that was streamed on the Japanese video service Niconico on 26 March 2020. A total of over 220 thousand viewers watched the show during its airtime.

== Artistry ==
=== Music and style ===
Music Samples:
E.G. Summer Rider
A 25-second sample of "E.G. Summer Rider", which is an uptempo pop number that firstly represents the E.G. Pop disc and theme from E.G. Crazy.

Cowgirl Rhapsody
One of the first numbers recognized from the E.G. Cool disc, the 24-second sample of "Cowgirl Rhapsody" represents their debut into a blend of Western culture within the lyrical and music content, and is influenced by French house and techno elements.

From the start of their career—namely with their debut "Celebration!" and album Lesson 1—the band's music was universally categorized by critics as a dance-influenced J-pop. However, Japanese magazine CD Journal believed that their debut adapted the trend of "soft" K-pop and EDM, two genres which were particularly prominent through the mid-2010s, along with its influenced on the Western market. Furthermore, the magazine noted its similarities between nameless Korean and Japanese bands because of their "catchy" dance melodies, and Billboard Japan commented about their inheritance of the dance genre from brother band Exile, which they described as "DNA". Majority of the content were handled by a variety of Japanese composers and producers, such as Clarabell, Kazuhiro Hara, and frequent songwriter Masoto Kotake, but their single "The Never Ending Story", a cover song originally performed by English singer Limahl, was composed by Giorgio Moroder. Their second album, Colorful Pop (2014), saw a return to their dance-pop style, but a writer of Selective Hearing noticed that the sound was a more "upward trend" than their debut.

The material, particularly the "faster tracks" and cover songs: "Rydeen (Dance All Night)" by Yellow Magic Orchestra, "Koi no Boogie Woogie Train" by Ann Lewis, and "I Heard a Rumour" by Bananarama, were widely praised for the producers abilities to "reconfigure J-pop's past into the buzzing present." But once again, the ballad entries were slated for their "mood killing" appeal. For their third studio album, E.G. Time (2014), it saw a change in musical style, particularly with the uptempo numbers. Additionally, the band's management, LDH, hired a variety of new producers and composers to work on the album, namely Yasutaka Nakata, Lauren Kaori, Fast Lane, and husband-wife duo T.Kura and Michico. This was their first record to remove a large portion of ballad songs, having been replaced with "aggressive" EDM numbers and "twinkly" electropop anthems. According to Patrick St. Michel, writing for The Japan Times, majority of the recordings have the vocalists singing in unison, which has been a notable factor in various Japanese acts such as AKB48 and their sister groups; the writer identified "Music Flyer" as the most prominent example from E.G. Time. Subsequently, he felt the track re-introduced them back into the K-pop genre.

For their fourth studio album, a double release titled E.G. Crazy (2017), E-girls presented two parallel themes; E.G. Pop and E.G. Cool. The former theme endorsed a "pop[pier]" and "fun" vibe that graced their previous work, whilst E.G. Cool emphasized a "cooler" and "sexy" sound. The first offerings to these themes were the "dynamic" dance-pop anthem "E.G. Summer Rider", and the tropical house number inspired by 1980s disco, "Pink Champagne". Additionally, many tracks from the collection emphasized a variety of Western genres such as French house, rock, hip-hop and dubstep.

=== Image ===
On numerous occasions, E-girls have been recognized by publications as an idol group, due to their dominance of the Japanese market, on-going line-up changes and similarities to a variety of Japanese idol bands. However, by the release of their studio album E.G. Time, Patrick St. Michel of The Japan Times identified how the group "buck most of the major idol trends", specifically saying; "They shun idol-standard amateurism in favor of K-pop-like precision," and identified their song "Music Flyer" as the most notable change in this type of appeal. Furthermore, he explained another trait was the typical performance of idol groups singing in "unison", but said "...whereas AKB48 just sound louder, E-Girls turn it into a focused, wordless chant." With the release of their album E.G. Crazy in 2017, E-girls yet again broadened their appeal by emphasising two styles; a "pop[pier]" and "fun" vibe that brings reminiscence of their earlier work, whilst E.G. Cool showcased a more "sexy" image; this was first presented in the jacket covers for their 2016 single "Pink Champagne". Not long after, the girls released their single "Go! Go! Let's Go!", which saw a new transition in image; they adapted a theme titled Japanese Neo Girls, which utilizes different cultures from a Japanese women's perspective. For example, "Go! Go! Let's Go!" focused on a variety of Japanese cultures such as traditional wear (kimono) to Otaku culture.

Furthermore, their promotional recordings: "All Day Long Lady" and "Harajuku Time Bomb" focused on Westernized "office ladies", while the latter was influenced by the style in Harajuku. Throughout their work, E-girls have been known for their "striking visuals and impressive dance numbers", and were credited with gaining "well-deserved popularity, proving they can bring just as much dancing and great music as their male counterparts." When their greatest hits album E.G. Smile: E-girls Best (2016) was announced, website J-Generation concluded, "While Exile is loved by girls all over the world for their soul and dance, E-girls gave those same fans the girl group they could relate to and sparked the beginning of their now four year long catalog of successful hits."

==== Seifuku dances ====
As part of the group's singles, the performing members conduct an additional segment to their music video's called a Seifuku Dance (制服ダンス, Uniform dance). These small clips are connected to the story line of the parent music videos—which are regularly placed at the start of end of the visual—and generally focus on various dance styles by the performers and its accompanying instrumental composition. Despite this, some singing members, such as Erie Abe, Mayu Sugieda, Karen Fujii, Ruri Kawamoto, Chiharu Muto, Kyoka Ichicki, and Yuzuna Takebe, have appeared in selected visuals. (Note: See E-girls discography to view more information about the seifuku dances and members list.) Some compositions from a seifuku dance have been adapted into full-length recordings: "Kurukuru" was used in their track "Move It! (Dream & E-girls Time)", "Odoru Ponpokorin" was sampled into the E-girls song "Boom Boom Christmas", and sections from "Mr. Snowman" were placed in their song "Express (Do Your Dance)". Like their official singles, each performing member is assessed by a line-up change, meaning only selected members are featured in the respective seifuku dance. Each dance was included on the DVD/Blu-ray bundles of their album E.G. Smile: E-girls Best.

=== Reception ===
In early 2014, teen magazine Anan, which generally explores various youth cultures such as idol and kawaii culture, included E-girls amongst many other idol groups for their special February issue. In 2015, Nikkei Entertainment released their annual top girl-group bands, and E-girls were ranked at number 4 with 18.4% of the votes. According to the list, over half the entries were idol groups, and six were sister acts of the AKB48 family. At the end of 2016, Oricon conducted an artist ranking and their album E.G. Smile: E-girls Best became their first release to enter the top twenty best-sellers list (placed at number 11), and were ranked the 9th highest-grossing Japanese act with reported revenue up to ¥1.75 billion (an approximate equivalent to $15.57 million USD).

== Side projects ==
Apart from their respective groups Dream, Happiness and Flower, E-girls and LDH have established three side-projects. The first sub-group from E-girls wasShuuKaRen, which consists of sisters Karen Fujii from Happiness and Shuuka Fujii of Flower. This was the first musical release to feature both siblings together, after first distributing their fashion coffee table book Antithese, which garnered critical success and sold over 100,000 units in Japan. LDH conceived ShuuKaRen as "two vocal divas" that create music "based on black [culture]". Their debut single "Universe" was released on 5 October 2016, and featured co-lead vocals by Shuuka; this was the first time Shuuka had provided vocals to any E-girls related effort, and was the first overall member from the group since Ruri Kawamoto to be promoted as a vocalist.

The second sub-group established from E-girls are SudannaYuzuYully, which features sole E-girls member Yuzuna Takebe as the main vocalist, and Happiness' Anna Suda and Yurino as rappers and performers; like the former side-project, it is the first time Suda and Yurino provide vocals to any E-girls work, and also makes Suda and Yurino the third and fourth members to be promoted as vocalists through LDH. The trio, who will base their music around contemporary dance and hip-hop music, released their debut single "Oh Boy" in March 2017.

Although not a musical or performing act, Happiness member Kaede and Flower member Harumi Sato created a sub-group named Twin Tower, which showcases them as exclusive models for fashion and other product endorsements; they are the first side project to not reveal any vocal or performing activities. They are officially represented by LDH, and debuted in October 2015.

== Members ==
=== Happiness ===
Name	Birth date (age)	Act			
Name	Birth date (age)	Act	Sayaka Nagatomo (長友 さやか, Nagatomo Sayaka)	20 September 1995 (age 31)	Performer
Kaede Dobashi (土橋 楓, Dobashi Kaede)	11 January 1996 (age 30)	Performer			
Karen Fujii (藤井 夏恋, Fujii Karen)	16 July 1996 (age 30)	Vocalist and performer			
Yurino Suzuki (鈴木 結莉乃, Suzuki Yurino)	6 February 1996 (age 30)	Vocalist and performer (Note: This member only provides vocals in their respective sub-unit; see E-girls#Side projects for more.)			
Anna Suda (須田 アンナ, Suda Anna)	12 October 1997 (age 29)	Vocalist and performer			

=== Flower ===
Name	Birth date (age)	Act			
Name	Birth date (age)	Act	Reina Washio (鷲尾 伶菜, Washio Reina)	20 January 1994 (age 32)	Vocalist
Nozomi Bando (坂東 希, Bandō Nozomi)	14 September 1997 (age 29)	Performer			
Harumi Sato (佐藤 晴美, Satō Harumi)	8 June 1995 (age 31)	Performer			

=== Original E-girls ===
Name	Birth date (age)	Act			
Name	Birth date (age)	Act	Anna Ishii (石井 杏奈, Ishii Anna)	11 July 1998 (age 28)	Performer
Nonoka Yamaguchi (山口 乃々華, Yamaguchi Nonoka)	8 March 1998 (age 28)	Performer			
Yuzuna Takebe (武部柚那, Takebe Yuzuna)	17 June 1998 (age 28)	Vocalist and performer			

=== Former members ===
Name	Sub-group	Years active within group	Act				
Name	Sub-group	Years active within group	Act	Sayaka Yamamoto (山本 紗也加, Yamamoto Sayaka)	Dream	2011	Vocalist and performer (Note: Sayaka Yamamoto was a vocalist and performer to E-girls, but left after the release of their debut single "Celebration!"; she only appeared as a performer for it.)
Mimu Hoiki (日置 美夢, Hioki Mimu)	Happiness	2011	Performer				
Runa Yamamoto (山本 月, Yamamoto Runa)	Bunny	2012	Performer				
Mira Watts (ヴァッツ 美良, Vattsu Mira)	Bunny	2011–2012	Performer				
Mizuki Hanayama (花山水樹, Hanayama Mizuki)	Bunny	2011–2012	Performer				
Miyū Ōishi (大石 美優, Ōishi Miyū)	Bunny	2011–2012	Performer				
Reina Kizu (木津 玲奈, Kizu Reina)	EGD	2012–2013	Performer				
Erina Mizuno (水野 絵梨奈, Mizuno Erina)	Flower	2011–2013	Performer				
Mayu Suigeda (杉枝 真結, Suigeda Mayu)	Happiness	2011–2012 (hiatus), 2013–2014	Vocalist and performer				
Kyoka Takeda (武田 杏香, Takeda Kyōka)	Bunny	2012–2014	Performer				
Chiharu Muto (武藤 千春, Mutō Chiharu)	Flower	2011–2014	Vocalist and performer				
Kyoka Ichiki (市來 杏香, Ichiki Kyōka)	Flower	2011–2015	Vocalist and performer				
Rio Inagaki (稲垣 莉生, Inagaki Rio)	E-girls / Bunnies	2011–2016 (Note: These members were first featured in the line-up for E-girls between their respective years, but were removed in 2016 by LDH, and transferred into yet-to-debut group Rabbits for further training; only member Yuzuna Takebe has been re-added back into E-girls.)	Performer				
Momoka Nakajima (中嶋 桃花, Nakajima Momoka)	E-girls / Bunnies	2013–2016	Performer				
Misato Hagio (萩尾 美聖, Hagio Misato)	E-girls / Rabbits	2011–2016	Performer				
Marina Watanabe (渡邉 真梨奈, Watanabe Marina)	E-girls / Rabbits	2013–2016	Performer				
Risa Ikuta (生田梨沙, Ikuta Risa)	E-girls / Rabbits	2013–2016	Performer				
Erie Abe (阿部絵里恵, Abe Erie)	Dream	2011–2016	Vocalist, performer, disc jockey				
Shizuka Nishida (西田 静香, Nishida Shizuka)	Dream	2011–2017	Vocalist and performer				
Aya Takamoto (高本 彩, Takamoto Aya)	Dream	2011–2017	Vocalist, performer and E-girls leader				
Ami Nakashima (中島 麻未, Nakashima Ami)	Dream	2011–2017	Vocalist and performer and Dream leader				
Miyuu Ariiso (有磯 実結, Ariiso Miyū)	Happiness	2011–2017	Performer				
Ruri Kawamoto (川本 璃, Kawamoto Ruri)	Happiness	2011–2017	Vocalist and performer				
Shuuka Fujii (藤井 萩花, Fujii Shuuka)	Flower	2011–2017	Vocalist and performer				
Manami Shigetome (重留 真波, Shigetome Manami)	Flower	2011–2017	Performer				
Mio Nakajima (中島美央, Nakajima Mio)	Flower	2011–2017	Performer				

== Discography ==
Studio albums

- Lesson 1 (2013)
- Colorful Pop (2014)
- E.G. Time (2015)
- E.G. Crazy (2017)
- E.G. 11 (2018)

Compilation albums

- E.G. Smile: E-girls Best (2016)
- E-girls (2020)

Singles (selected work)

- "Follow Me"
- "Candy Smile"
- "Gomennasai no Kissing You"
- "E.G. Anthem: We Are Venus"
- "Highschool Love"
- "Mr. Snowman"
- "Anniversary!!"
- "Pink Champagne"

== Tours ==
=== As a lead artist ===
Year	Period	Title
2014	from 18 July to 13 August	E-girls LIVE TOUR 2014 "COLORFUL LAND"
2015	from 14 February to 29 April	E-girls LIVE TOUR 2015 "COLORFUL WORLD"
2016	from 12 March to 11 August	E-girls LIVE TOUR 2016 "E.G. SMILE"
2018	from 2 June to 5 August	E-girls LIVE TOUR 2018 ~E.G. 11~
2020	from 1 February to 4 July	E-girls PERFECT LIVE 2011▶2020

=== As a participating group ===
Year	Title	Artist
2012	EXILE TRIBE LIVE TOUR 2012 ~TOWER OF WISH~	Exile Tribe
2014	EXILE TRIBE PERFECT YEAR LIVE TOUR TOWER OF WISH 2014 ~THE REVOLUTION~	Exile Tribe
2016	HiGH&LOW THE LIVE	Exile Tribe
2019	E.G.POWER 2019 ~POWER to the DOME~	E.G.Family

=== As a support act ===
Year	Title	Artist
2011	EXILE LIVE TOUR 2011 TOWER OF WISH ~Negai no Tou~	Exile

=== Concerts ===
Date	Title
14 June 2015	E-girls LIVE 2015 at UNIVERSAL STUDIOS JAPAN
15–16 July 2017	E-girls LIVE 2017 ~E.G.EVOLUTION~

== Filmography ==
=== TV shows ===
Year	Title	Network
2011–present	Weekly Exile (週間EXILE)	TBS
2011–2012	E-Girls ga! Monku no Sakebi	
2014–2015	Akeru na Kiken	
2015–2016	E-girls wo Majime ni Kangaeru Kaigi	
2015–2016	EG-style	Fuji TV

=== Internet programs ===
Year	Title	Network
2013–2014	E-girls movies!!	
2018–present	Zenryoku Bukatsu! E-kou!	AbemaTV

=== Music video appearances ===
Year	Title	Artist	Album
2011	"Rising Sun"	Exile	
2013	"EXILE PRIDE ~Konna Sekai wo Aisuru Tame~"	Exile	
2017	"Y.M.C.A."	Generations from Exile Tribe	

== Publications ==
=== Photobooks ===
Year	Release date	Title	Ref.
2014	17 October	Colorful Diary (カラフル・ダイアリー)	
