= Music Flyer =

Promotional single by E-girls

from the album E.G. Time
- Released: December 17, 2014 (Japan); January 1, 2015 (Worldwide)
- Recorded: 2014
- Genre: Electronic dance music
- Length: 3:38
- Label: Rhythm Zone; Avex Music Creative Inc.
- Songwriter: Yasutaka Nakata
- Producers: Nakata; Exile Hiro

"Music Flyer" is a song recorded and performed by Japanese collective unit E-girls, taken as a promotional single of their third studio album E.G. Time (2015). It was released on December 17, 2014, for streaming, and December 24 as a limited pre-order track to the record through digital outlets such as iTunes Store and Amazon.com; the song was made available for worldwide digital consumption on January 1, 2015, the same date as the parent record's release. It was written, composed, arranged and produced by Japanese musician and Capsule member Yasutaka Nakata, marking the band's first collaboration with him, and was co-produced by Exile Hiro.

Musically, "Music Flyer" is an electronic dance number that incorporates elements of technopop and house music, a primary sound that Nakata works with. Additionally, the recording was compared to the works of K-pop artists and the Korean wave, and was highlighted as an influence from several idol groups in Japan. Lyrically, it delves into change and moving on with life and ambitions. Upon its release, "Music Flyer" received critical acclaim from music critics, many whom selected it as the best entry to the album, and praised its composition. Critics also noted Nakata's involvement with the track as a significant factor to its success.

Despite no immediate commercial success, it was believed to be one of the most rotated tracks via airplay within Japan, between January and February 2015. In order to promote the single, it was used as the official theme song for the Japanese social app 755, which also starred selected members from E-girls, and was performed on every date for their 2016 Colorful World tour.

== Background and composition ==
In mid-November 2014, E-girls revealed information about their third studio album E.G. Time, which was scheduled for a New Year's Day release, and their respective formats. Subsequently, several music outlets published further details about the record by the end of that month, including the jacket covers and track listing; "Music Flyer" was included on the list at number four, and was confirmed by the group's management LDH. On December 16, the band confirmed their involvement with the Japanese communication and social app 755, which allows fans to connect with their favourite musicians that are signed to the company; the girls additionally confirmed that the official theme sound would be "Music Flyer", and would distributed on December 24, 2014, as a pre-ordered track to E.G. Time. However, its release was pushed forward, and begun streaming via iTunes Store and Amazon.com in Japan on December 17. Furthermore, the track, amongst other entries, were made available for digital consumption seven days later, as part of a limited pre-order campaign for the parent record.

"Music Flyer" was written, composed, arranged and produced by Japanese musician and Capsule member Yasutaka Nakata, marking the band's first collaboration with him. The musician was in fact working with other artists at the time, namely Japanese singer Kyary Pamyu Pamyu, and technopop trio Perfume, and accepted an offer to work with E-girls. Musically, it is an electronic dance number that incorporates elements of technopop and house music, a primary sound that Nakata works with. In a similar analysis, Patrick St. Michel from The Japan Times believed the track was inspired by the effects of the Korean wave, namely the musical element of K-pop. Serving as the only songwriter to the recording, Nakata expressed that he wanted the lyrical content to discusses the themes of change and moving onwards. He explained that the group's release was heading into the New Year, and wanted to feel like it was "new wind" at an "accelerating force". It is one of two original songs from E.G. Time to feature all remaining vocalists of the band up until E-girls and Flower member, Chiharu Muto, left both groups in October 2014; these singers are Shizuka, Aya, Ami, Erie, Karen Fujii, Ruri Kawamoto, Reina Washio, Kyoka Ichiki and Yuzuna Takebe. (Note: "Music Flyer", alongside the song "Kibou no Hikari (Mirai wo Shinjite)", feature all remaining vocalists up until Chiharu Muto's leave in October 2014, marking these two recordings the more recent inclusions to the album. However, the album entries: "E.G. Anthem: We Are Venus", "Ureshii! Tanoshii! Daisuki!" and "Chocolat" had all singers including Muto, giving a total of five songs that included each remaining vocalist up until that time frame of her departure.) Additionally, it is also one of the final recordings to feature Kyoka Ichiki, whom departed from the two same groups in October that year. (Note: All six tracks: "E.G. Anthem: We Are Venus", "Music Flyer", "Ureshii! Tanoshii! Daisuki!", "Again", "Chocolat" and "Kibou no Hikari (Mirai wo Shinjite)" were singer Kyoka Ichiki's final vocal performances with E-girls after her departure from E-girls in October 2015. She did not appear as a vocalist or performer in the following singles "Anniversary!!" (May 2015) and "Dance Dance Dance" (September 2015); though she was included in the promo photo for the former, her appearance in the latter was pulled by Avex Group.)

== Reception ==
Upon its release, "Music Flyer" received critical acclaim from music critics. Writing for The Japan Times, Patrick St. Michel highlighted the number as his favorite track from the album. He believed "Music Flyer" was the only example from E.G. Time where E-girls "buck most of the major idol trends", and additionally "shun idol-standard amateurism in favor of K-pop-like precision,". In conclusion, he praised its catchiness and production. In a similar review, CD Journal selected it as one of the better cuts from the record, and praised Nakata's songwriting and "uplifting" involvement, to which the magazine felt it had the "Yasutaka Nakata seal". The writer had personally noted that it made his/her "heart bounce" once it is played. An editor from Barks.jp also enjoyed the track, calling it a "stand out" to Nakata and the girls discography, and described it as a "power[ful] dance tune". In an article written by a staff member of OKmusic.jp, they commended the tracks dance sound, and credited Nakata's involvement as part of this. Additionally, he/she had high prospects for the track's success within 2015. Commercially, "Music Flyer" did not enter any component charts inside of Japan, but according to Okmusic.jp, the recording was one of the most heavily rotated numbers between January and February 2015.

== Promotion and performances ==
In order to promote the single, E-girls took part on a commercial for the Japanese communication and social app 755, who also teamed up with another Japanese group, AKB48. Members Shizuka, Aya, Ami from Dream, Karen Fujii and Kaede from Happiness, and Shuuka Fujii and Reina Washio from Flower participated in two live commercials; the first showcased each member performing "Music Flyer" on stage with additional information about the app, while the second featured Aya chanting to the girls as they all go towards the stage; Ami is then seen using the app on her phone. The video premiered on December 15 on the Maidigi TV YouTube channel, and was published throughout Japan two days later. On December 16, both AKB48 and E-girls members Washio, Karen and Shuuka Fujii and Kaede made an appearance at a press conference talking about the app and "Music Flyer". The track continued to be its theme song until March 12, 2016. So far, the band have included the recording on one of their concert tours; the Colorful World 2015 show, where it appeared as the opening number. The track was included on every tour date, and subsequently added onto their live release that coincided with the triple DVD/Blu-ray bundles for their greatest hits album E.G. Smile: E-girls Best (2016).

== Track listing ==
Digital download

- "Music Flyer" – 3:38

== Personnel ==
Credits adapted from the CD liner notes of the parent album E.G. Time.

Vocalists

- Shizuka – vocals, background vocals
- Aya – vocals, background vocals, leader
- Ami – vocals, background vocals
- Erie Abe – vocals, background vocals, leader
- Karen Fujii – vocals, background vocals
- Ruri Kawamoto – vocals, background vocals
- Reina Washio – vocals, background vocals
- Kyoka Ichiki – vocals, background vocals
- Yuzuna Takabe – vocals, background vocals

Performers (Note: Although there were no visuals produced for the single, each performing member appeared for the track on their Colorful World Tour in 2016.)

- Sayaka – performer
- Kaede – performer
- Karen Fujii – performer
- Miyuu – performer
- Yurino – performer
- Anna Suda – performer
- Shuuka Fujii – performer
- Manami Shigetome – performer
- Mio Nakajima – performer
- Nozomi Bando – performer
- Harumi Sato – performer
- Anna Ishii – performer
- Nonoka Yamaguchi – performer
- Yuzuna Takabe – performer

Production

- Yasutaka Nakata – arranger, producer
- Exile Hiro – producer

== Release history ==
Region	Date	Format	Label	Ref.
Japan	December 17, 2014	Streaming	Rhythm Zone	
Japan	December 24, 2014	Digital download	Rhythm Zone	
Australia	January 1, 2015	Digital download	Avex Music Creative Inc.	
New Zealand	January 1, 2015	Digital download	Avex Music Creative Inc.	
United Kingdom	January 1, 2015	Digital download	Avex Music Creative Inc.	
Ireland	January 1, 2015	Digital download	Avex Music Creative Inc.	
Germany	January 1, 2015	Digital download	Avex Music Creative Inc.	
France	January 1, 2015	Digital download	Avex Music Creative Inc.	
Spain	January 1, 2015	Digital download	Avex Music Creative Inc.	
Taiwan	January 1, 2015	Digital download	Avex Music Creative Inc.	
United States	January 1, 2015	Digital download	Avex Music Creative Inc.	
Canada	January 1, 2015	Digital download	Avex Music Creative Inc.	
