= E.G. Time =

- Digital artwork, and standard cover for some formats

Studio album by E-girls
- Released: December 24, 2014
- Recorded: 2014
- Genre: J-pop; electronic dance music
- Length: 58:40
- Language: Japanese
- Label: Rhythm Zone
- Producer: Exile Hiro

E-girls chronology
Colorful Pop (2014)	E.G. Time (2014)	E.G. Smile: E-girls Best (2016)

Singles from Colorful Pop
- 1. "E.G. Anthem: We Are Venus" Released: June 12, 2014; 2. "Odoru Ponpokorin" Released: July 16, 2014; 3. "Highschool Love" Released: September 10, 2014; 4. "Mr. Snowman" Released: November 26, 2014

E.G. Time is the third studio album by Japanese collective unit E-girls, released digitally on December 24, 2014, and physically on January 1, 2015 (New Year's Day) by Rhythm Zone and Avex Music Creative Inc. The record was produced by Exile Hiro's, and created by a variety of producers, composers and songwriters outside and from Japan, namely Clarabell, Yasutaka Nakata, Fast Lane, T.Kura, amongst others. It was distributed in 10 different formats, with various artwork sleeves and musical and visual material. E.G. Time also serves as the final record for numerous vocalists and performers in the band.

Musically, E.G. Time was a departure to the group's typical J-pop sound, and incorporated elements of electronic dance music. Additionally, a large portion of ballad-esque numbers were omitted from the album, recognized as their first effort to do so by music critics. The lyrical content delves into a number of themes, such as having fun, moving forward and embracing the future, love and friendships. Upon its release, E.G. Time received positive reviews from critics, who commended the group's shift in sound and stronger performances.

Commercially, E.G. Time experienced success in Japan, reaching atop of the Oricon Albums Chart and Hot Albums Chart, the latter published by Billboard. It was certified Platinum by the Recording Industry Association of Japan (RIAJ) for shipments of 250,000 units, while Oricon labels it as their best-selling studio release. In order to promote the album, four songs were released as singles; "E.G. Anthem: We Are Venus", "Odoru Ponpokorin", "Highschool Love" and "Mr. Snowman"; selected tracks were used as promotional recordings prior to the album's release. Furthermore, the group conducted their Colorful World Tour in 2015, performing in various arenas in Japan.

== Background and composition ==
After a series of line-up changes in 2014—which saw the departure of vocalist Mayu Sugieda and Kyoka Takeda—E-girls announced the work of a new studio that was intended to be released in early 2015. The band released a string of singles between July–November that same year, which were all confirmed to be included on the upcoming record. However, just before "Mr. Snowman" was executed for a release in late November 2014, vocalist Chiharu Muto departed from the band and her sub-group Flower, which left several unreleased songs to be re-recorded again. With that said, it is their first album without ex-members Sugieda, Takeda and Muto, and serves as the final participation with members Rio Inagaki, Momoka Nakajima, Misato Hagio, Marina Watanabe, Risa Ikuta, and vocalist Kyoka Ichiki, the latter who left the band in October the following year; the remaining removal of these members were due to a new E-girls Pyramid strategy that was inducted in early January 2015. (Note: Sole E-girls member Yuzuna Takebe—who also serves as a E-girls vocalist—was removed from the band line-up, but re-added in December 2015 after Ichiki's departure.) Furthermore, it serves as Erie Abe's final record to include her vocals as an E-girls member, after she confirmed her graduation as a singer/performer and worked with the band as a disc jockey. (Note: Erie Abe provided vocals on their 2017 studio album E.G. Crazy, but only because she was a Dream member, as Dream were credited as vocalists to some of the songs included on there.)

Musically, E.G. Time was a departure to the group's typical J-pop sound, and incorporated elements of electronic dance music. The record focuses primarily on uptempo tracks, with some exceptions; "Mr. Snowman" is a holiday song whilst "Rock n Roll Widow" and "Odoru Ponpokorin" are both cover songs originally performed by Momoe Yamaguchi and B.B.Queens, respectively. The promotional recording "Music Flyer" is influenced by K-pop, as described by Patrick St. Michel at The Japan Times, and he believed it was their first recording to buck the "traditional" idol trend. Although there is an absence of ballad-esque numbers, recognized as their first record to do so, only the closing track "Kibō no Hikari: Mirai o Shinjite" was noted as a low-tempo recording.

== Reception ==
Upon its release, E.G. Time received positive reviews from music critics. An editor from CD Journal commended the album's "colorful" production, and highlighted the singles as the best tracks. Additionally, the reviewer also selected "Music Flyer" and "Rock n Roll Widow" as another pair of great songs on the album. Similarly, Patrick St. Michel, writing for The Japan Times, complimented the record's musical direction and praised the band's growth as musicians and performers. Whilst highlighting "Music Flyer" as the album's greatest moment, he concluded that E-girls were a "top level J-pop act..." and that E.G. Time is "2015’s first great J-pop album...". Moreover, a member at Selective Hearing gave a fairly mixed opinion. Although the review commended the band's "aggressive" tracks such as "Move It!" and "Rock n Roll Widow", the editor of the article felt the remaining material was "status quo" and "extremely safe J-pop".

Commercially, E.G. Time experienced success in Japan. It opened at number one on the daily Oricon Albums Chart, continuing their chart-topping streak. However, the record debuted at number two on the weekly chart, based on four days worth of sales, and was beaten by Ikimono-gakari's Fun! Fun! Fanfare!, which shifted over 100,000 copies. Subsequently, both albums switch positions, whereas E.G. Time sold 75,950 copies in its second week, more than their 64,396 unit debut. The following week, it slipped to number two with 37,003 sales, but fell steadily after a series of weeks. The record was placed as the 7th best-selling album of December, and raised two positions in January's rankings. E.G. Time lasted 51 weeks inside the top 300 chart, and was the 14th highest-selling album of 2015. As of 2016, the album has sold over 273,215 copies in Japan, and was certified Platinum by the Recording Industry Association of Japan (RIAJ) for shipments of 250,000 units; according to Oricon, they have labelled it as their best-selling studio release.

== Singles ==
Three songs from the album were released as official singles, with one promotional single:

- "E.G. Anthem: We Are Venus" is the first single from the album and ninth overall. It was released digitally on June 12, 2014 and physically on July 9, 2014. It features vocals from all of the group's vocalists. The single sold 49,207 in its first week.
- "Odoru Ponpokorin" is the second single from the album and tenth overall. It was first released as a digital single on June 6, 2014 titled "Odoru Ponpokorin (TV Size)". The official single was released digitally on July 16, 2014 and physically on August 13, 2014. It features vocals from Dream's Ami, Flower's Reina, Happiness's Karen, and Rabbits member Yuzuna. The single sold 31,777 in its first week.
- "Highschool Love" is the third single from the album and eleventh overall. It was released on September 10, 2014 in four editions: CD Only Version, CD+DVD Version, One Coin CD Version and Music Card editions for each member. It features vocals from Dream's Shizuka and Ami, Flower's Reina, Happiness's Karen, and Rabbits member Yuzuna. The single sold 61,046 in its first week.
- "Mr. Snowman" is the fourth single from the album and twelfth overall. It was released on November 26, 2014 in four editions: CD Only Version, CD+DVD Version, One Coin CD Version and Music Card editions for each member. It features vocals from Dream's Shizuka and Ami, Flower's Reina, and Happiness's Karen. The single sold 43,653 in its first week.

== Track listing ==
All editions track listing
No.	Title	Length
1.	"Introduction"	0:17
2.	"E.G. Anthem: We Are Venus"	3:24
3.	"Mr.Snowman"	3:49
4.	"Music Flyer"	3:40
5.	"Move It! Dream & E-girls Time"	3:40
6.	"Rock 'n' Roll Widow" (ロックンロール・ウィドウ)	4:25
7.	"Highschool Love"	3:57
8.	"Odoru Ponpokorin" (おどるポンポコリン;)	3:26
9.	"Jiyū no Megami: Yuvuraia" (自由の女神 ~ユーヴライア~; "Statue of Liberty: Yuvuraia")	3:54
10.	"Ureshii! Tanoshii! Daisuki!" (うれしい！たのしい！大好き！; "Happy! Fun! Love!!")	4:04
11.	"Again"	4:13
12.	"Chocolat" (ショコラ;)	5:01
13.	"Gomennasai no Kissing You" (E.G. Time Version)	3:43
14.	"Follow Me" (E.G. Time Version)	4:06
15.	"Kibō no Hikari: Mirai o Shinjite" (希望の光 ~未来を信じて~; "Ray of Hope: Believe in the Future")	6:35
Total length:		58:40

DVD/Blu-ray
No.	Title	Length
1.	"Move It! Dream & E-girls Time" (music video)
2.	"E.G. Anthem: We Are Venus" (music video)
3.	"Highschool ♡ Love" (music video)
4.	"Mr.Snowman" (music video)
5.	"Odoru Ponpokorin" (music video)
6.	"Odoru Ponpokorin" (animation clip)
7.	"E-girls Live Tour 2014 "Colorful Land"" (documentary)

Limited edition bonus CD 2 track listing
No.	Title	Length
1.	"Rydeen: Dance All Night (M-flo remix)"
2.	"Rydeen: Dance All Night (DJ Daruma & Chaki Zulu remix)"
3.	"Rydeen: Dance All Night (Yellow Claw remix)"
4.	"Rydeen: Dance All Night (Habanero Posse remix)"
5.	"Rydeen: Dance All Night (Watapachi remix)"
6.	"Rydeen: Dance All Night (M-flo DnB remix)"

== Personnel ==
=== Vocalists ===
- "E.G. Anthem: We Are Venus" – Shizuka (Dream), Aya (Dream), Ami (Dream), Erie (Dream), Karen (Happiness), Ruri (Happiness), Reina (Flower), Chiharu (Flower), Kyoka (Flower), Yuzuna (Rabbits)
- "Mr. Snowman" – Shizuka (Dream), Ami (Dream), Karen (Happiness), Reina (Flower)
- "Music Flyer" – Shizuka (Dream), Aya (Dream), Ami (Dream), Erie (Dream), Karen (Happiness), Ruri (Happiness), Reina (Flower), Chiharu (Flower), Kyoka (Flower), Yuzuna (Rabbits)
- "Move It! Dream & E-girls Time-" – Shizuka (Dream), Aya (Dream), Ami (Dream), Erie (Dream)
- "Rock 'n' Roll Widow" – Shizuka (Dream), Erie (Dream), Reina (Flower)
- "Highschool Love" – Shizuka (Dream), Ami (Dream), Karen (Happiness), Reina (Flower), Yuzuna (Rabbits)
- "Odoru Ponpokorin" – Ami (Dream), Karen (Happiness), Reina (Flower), Yuzuna (Rabbits)
- "Jiyū no Megami: Yuvuraia" – Shizuka (Dream), Ami (Dream), Karen (Happiness), Reina (Flower)
- "Ureshii! Tanoshii! Daisuki!" – Shizuka (Dream), Aya (Dream), Ami (Dream), Erie (Dream), Karen (Happiness), Ruri (Happiness), Reina (Flower), Chiharu (Flower), Kyoka (Flower), Yuzuna (Rabbits)
- "Again" – Aya (Dream), Ruri (Happiness), Kyoka (Flower)
- "Chocolat" – Shizuka (Dream), Aya (Dream), Ami (Dream), Erie (Dream), Karen (Happiness), Ruri (Happiness), Reina (Flower), Chiharu (Flower), Kyoka (Flower), Yuzuna (Rabbits)
- "Kibō no Hikari: Mirai o Shinjite" – Karen (Happiness), Ruri (Happiness), Reina (Flower), Kyoka (Flower), Yuzuna (Rabbits)

== Charts and sales ==
=== Japanese charts ===
Chart (2015–2016)	Peak position
Japan Top Album Sales (Billboard)	1
Japan Daily Chart (Oricon)	1
Japan Weekly Chart (Oricon)	1
Japan Monthly Chart (Oricon)	5

=== Year-end charts ===
Chart (2015)	Peak position
Japan Annual Chart (Oricon)	1

=== Sales ===
Region	Certification	Certified units/sales
Japan (RIAJ)	Platinum	273,215

== Release history ==
Country	Date	Format	Label
Japan	December 24, 2014	Digital download	Rhythm Zone
Japan	January 1, 2015	CD	Rhythm Zone
