= Karen Fujii =

Japanese singer (born 1996)

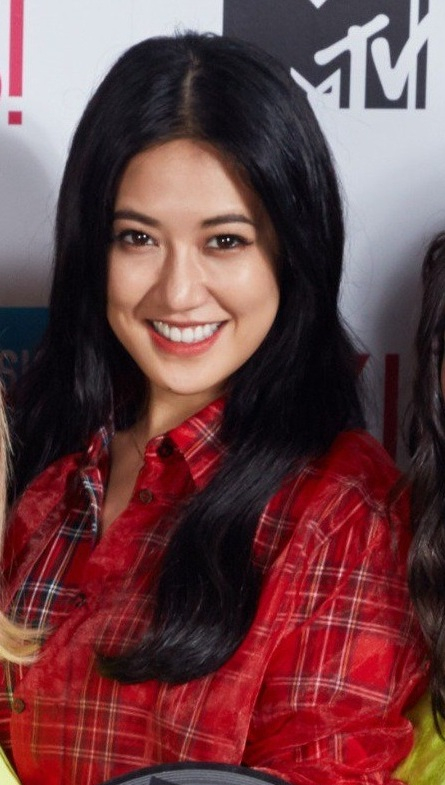
- Fujii in 2018
- Born: 16 July 1996 (age 30); Osaka Prefecture, Japan
- Occupations: Singer; dancer; actress; model
- Years active: 2009–present
- Agent: LDH
- Height: 1.64 m (5 ft 5 in) (2013)
- Spouse: Yu (m. 2024)
- Relatives: Ryusei Fujii (older brother); Shuuka Fujii (older sister)
- Musical career
- Genre: J-pop
- Label: Rhythm Zone
- Member of: Happiness
- Formerly of: E-girls; ShuuKaRen

Japanese name
- Kanji: 藤井夏恋
- Hiragana: ふじい かれん
- Romanization: Fujii Karen

Karen Fujii (藤井 夏恋, Fujii Karen; born 16 July 1996, in Osaka Prefecture) is a Japanese singer, dancer, model and actress. She is a member of the J-pop group Happiness, and a former member E-girls, and ShuuKaRen, and an exclusive model for the magazines JJ and Nicola. Karen is represented by LDH.

== Biography ==
Fujii entered the entertainment industry at a very young age after she was scouted in her hometown, Osaka. While belonging to the office in which she got scouted, she participated in one of Exile's dance competitions and began attending LDH's talent academy EXPG (Exile Professional Gym), studying both dancing and singing. Her sister Shuuka also attended EXPG. As a junior high school student, she moved from Osaka to Tokyo and started to live in a dormitory.

Fujii is the younger sister of Johnny's West member Ryusei Fujii and former E-girls, Flower and ShuuKaRen member Shuuka Fujii. Fujii is an aunt of twin boys by her sister Shuuka.

== Career ==
On October 26, 2008, Karen became one of the EXPG graduates who were chosen to be members of the performance group Happiness, marking the start in her career as a vocalist and performer. Her official stage name became Karen (stylized as KAREN).

In February 2009 she started her modeling career by becoming an exclusive model for the fashion magazine Nicola.

On February 9, 2011, she made her major debut with Happiness with their single "Kiss Me". On April 24 in the same year, she was announced as member of E-girls (alongside all other members of Happiness), having a concurrent position in E-girls and Happiness.

Karen graduated as an exclusive model for Nicola in May 2013. In June she changed her stage name and started using her birth name. On July 22, it was announced that Karen would start working as an exclusive model for JJ, also a fashion magazine, from its September issue onward.

In January 2014 she made her debut as an actress on the Nippon TV drama A Perfect Day for Love Letters (Koibumi Biyori).

On August 11, 2016, she was announced to debut in the unit ShuuKaRen alongside Shuuka Fujii. The duo debuted on October 5.

In February 2017, she was the cover of the April issue of JJ, being her first magazine cover since her debut as a model. On December 31 in the same year, Shuuka graduated from Flower and ShuuKaRen and retired from entertainment industry. With Karen being the only remaining member of the duo, ShuuKaRen disbanded.

In November 2018, Karen was chosen as one of the ambassadors for LDH Martial Arts' "ENERGY PROJECT" which advertises different fitness supplies from LDH's original brand.

On July 16, 2019, she released her first photobook titled KAREN. In August of the same year, Karen collaborated as a creative director with fashion label Samantha Thavasa for a collection of designer bags, titled Samantha Vega Girl. In the same year, she also starred in a special collaboration movie of Saint Laurent and i-D Japan alongside Sho Kiyohara.

== Personal life ==
On December 5, 2024, Fujii and the rock band I Don't Like Mondays.' vocalist, Yu, jointly announced their marriage through their official social media accounts. She announced her first pregnancy on her 30th birthday, on July 16, 2026.

== Filmography ==
=== Runways ===
Year	Title	Season	Ref.
2011	Tokyo Girls Collection	Autumn / Winter	
2012	point spring collection		
2012	Girls Award	Autumn / Winter	
2013	Kansai Collection	Spring / Summer	
2014	Kobe Collection	Spring / Summer	
2014	Tokyo Runway	Spring / Summer	
2015	Girls Award	Autumn / Winter	
2017	Tokyo Girls Collection	Autumn / Winter	
2017	Girls Award	Autumn / Winter	
2018	Tokyo Girls Collection	Spring / Summer	
2018	Tokyo Girls Collection	Autumn / Winter	
2018	Girls Award	Autumn / Winter	
2019	Tokyo Girls Collection Shizuoka 2019 for SDGs		

=== TV Dramas ===
Year	Title	Role	Network	Notes	Ref.
2014	A Perfect Day for Love Letters	Fumiko Kobayashi	NTV	Episode 5; Lead role	
2015	High & Low: The Story Of S.W.O.R.D.	Lara	NTV		
2016	High & Low Season 2	Lara	NTV		

=== Films ===
Year	Title	Role	Ref.
2016	Road To High & Low	Lara	
2016	High & Low: The Movie	Lara	
2017	High & Low The Movie 2 / End Of Sky	Lara	
2017	High & Low THE Movie 3 / Final Mission	Lara	

=== Internet TV ===
Year	Title	Website	Notes
2009–2010	nicola-chan	goomo	Occasional appearances

=== TV shows ===
Year	Title	Network	Notes	Ref.
2012–2013	Odori-ba	TV Tokyo	MC	

=== Commercials ===
Year	Title	Notes	Ref.
2017	& chouette	with other E-girls members directed by Nicola Formichetti	
2019	Samantha Thavasa 25th		
2019	Yofuku no Aoyama	with other E-girls members	

=== Music video appearances ===
Year	Title	Artist
2008	24 karats -type EX- (Kodomo Version)	Exile
2019	ONE -we are one-	Samantha Thavasa Family

=== Voice acting ===
Year	Title	Role
2017	High & Low g-sword Animation DVD Special Edition	Lara

== Bibliography ==
=== Style books/Photo books ===
Year	Title	Ref.
2016	Antithese	
2019	KAREN	

=== Magazines ===
Year	Title	Notes
2009–2013	Nicola	Exclusive model
2013–present	JJ	Exclusive model
2019	SWAG HOMMES	ISSUE9

=== Catalogues ===
Year	Title
2012	Kyoto Kimono Yuzen
