= Kaede (dancer) =

- 楓
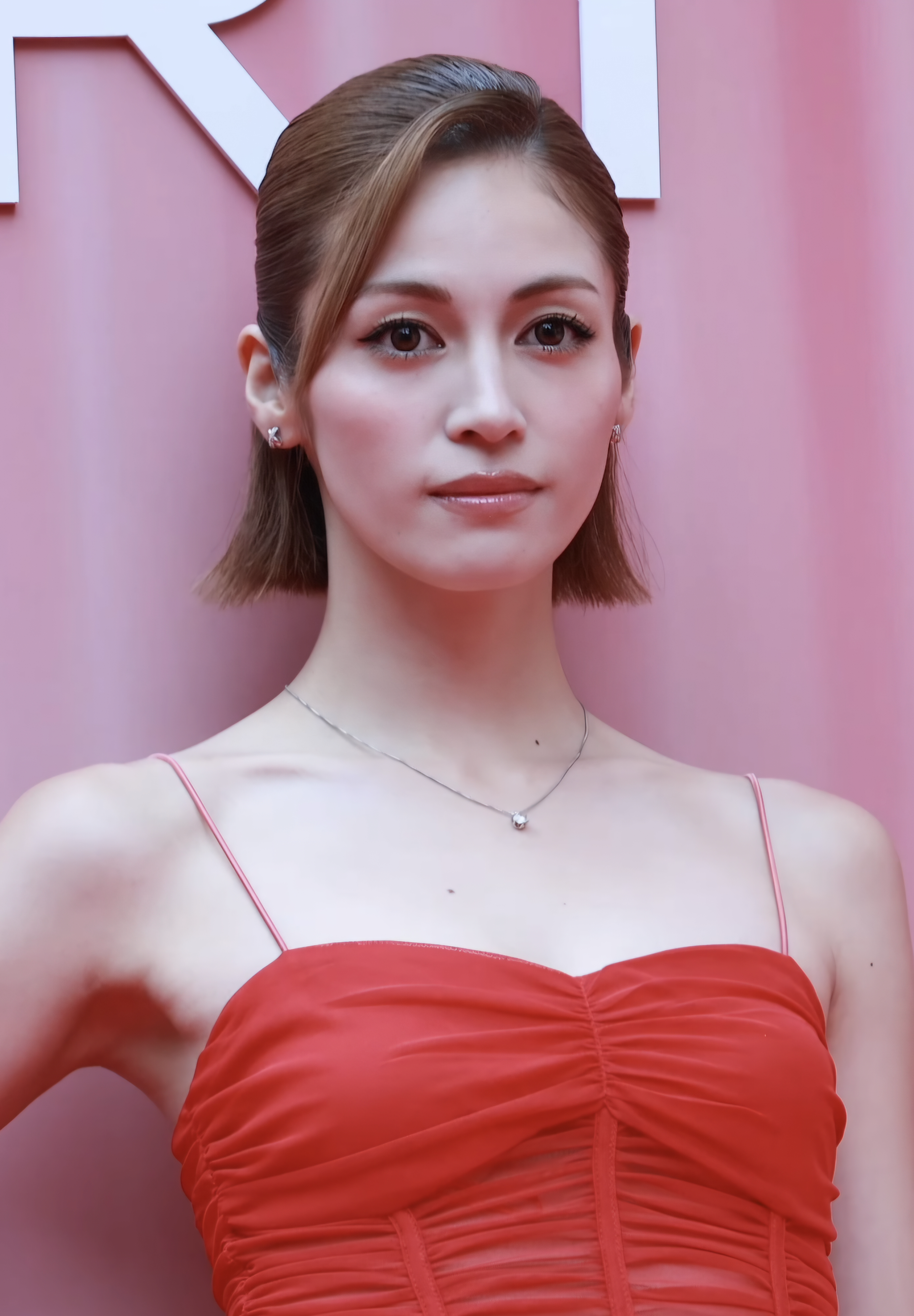
- Kaede in May 2025
- Born: Kaede Dobashi; January 11, 1996 (age 30); Yokosuka, Kanagawa, Japan
- Occupations: Model; dancer
- Years active: 2008–present
- Agent: LDH
- Height: 1.68 m (5 ft 6 in) (2013)
- Musical career
- Genre: J-pop
- Label: Rhythm Zone
- Formerly of: Happiness; E-girls

Kaede Dobashi (土橋 楓, Dobashi Kaede; born January 11, 1996), professionally known by her mononym Kaede (楓, Kaede) is a Japanese dancer, singer, model and actress who is affiliated with LDH. She is a member of the J-pop girl group f5ve and a former member of collective girl group E-girls and its dance and vocal unit Happiness. Kaede is an exclusive model for CanCam.

== Early life ==
Kaede was born on January 11, 1996, in Yokosuka, a city located in Kanagawa Prefecture, Japan. She has a younger brother and a younger sister.

She started dancing during her fourth year of elementary school, she later went to a dance school in Yokosuka, in which she was introduced to Exile's Tetsuya as her instructor, and went to the Exile Professional Gym (EXPG) in Tokyo during her first year in junior high school. Afterwards, she appeared at Exile's events, music videos and on tour as a background dancer.

== Career ==
In October 2008, a new performance group called Happiness was formed by EXPG graduates. Kaede was chosen to be one of their members and started her activities as a dancer stylized as KAEDE.

Kaede made her modelling debut in the March issue of the fashion magazine Glamorous in 2011. Happiness made their major debut with the single "Kiss Me" on February 9. Later in April, Kaede, as well as all the other members of Happiness, were announced to become members of E-girls. They would be having a concurrent position between the group and Happiness.

On June 3, 2013, she changed her name from KAEDE to Kaede (楓). Kaede later became an exclusive model for the fashion magazine CanCam in its September issue in July.

In January 2014, she made her acting debut in the Nippon TV series A Perfect Day for Love Letters alongside other members of E-girls. Later that year she also made her first solo appearance in the drama Shark: 2nd Season.

Kaede appeared on the cover of CanCam's June issue in April 2015. This was her first magazine cover since her debut as a model and the first time a member of E-girls appeared on a women's magazine cover by herself. Since then, she has been chosen as the cover model for CanCam several times.

On August 29, 2017, she released her first photobook titled Nee, Kiite!!.

On March 1, 2019, it was announced that Kaede, Ruri, and Sayaka were appointed as ambassadors for DeNA's Yokohama Girls☆Festival 2019 Supported by ありあけ 横濱ハーバーfrom May 31 to June 2. For this occasion, Kaede threw the opening pitch for the baseball game on the first day of the festival. On April 23, 2019, she was also chosen as one of the representative E-girls members alongside Harumi Sato, Nozomi Bando and Nonoka Yamaguchi for the advertisements of Mister Donut's Tapioca drink Tap！Tap！Tapioca!, a new product released on the same day. On September 1 in the same year, Kaede announced her collaboration with fashion accessory brand Hash feat. #F for the release of a collection of designer phone cases.

== Personal life ==
Kaede is the tallest member of Happiness at 1.68 m (5 ft 6 in), but second in E-girls only to Harumi Sato (Flower, 1.73 m (5 ft 8 in)). Starting as a nickname from the fans, they became the official model-duo Twin Tower. Kaede also co-starred with Harumi in Aoyama One Seg Kaihatsu.

In March 2014, in the Sankei Sports article "Watashitachiha Hontō no Performance o Todokeru koto o Mezashite iru. Idol de wa naku, Girls Performance Group desu." in which the members of E-girls were interviewed, she said that she has a sense of incongruity when she is an idol.

== Filmography ==
=== TV dramas ===
Year	Title	Role	Network	Notes	Ref(s)
2014	A Perfect Day for Love Letters	Ai Hayakawa	NTV	Episode 4; Lead role	
2014	Shark: 2nd Season	Makoto Yonezawa	NTV		
2015	High & Low: The Story Of S.W.O.R.D	Shiba	NTV		
2016	High & Low Season 2	Shiba	NTV		

=== Films ===
Year	Title	Role	Ref(s)
2016	Road To High & Low	Shiba	
2016	High & Low: The Movie	Shiba	
2017	High & Low: The Movie 2 / END OF SKY	Shiba	
2017	High & Low: The Movie 3 / FINAL MISSION	Shiba	

== Other works ==
- Yokohama Girls☆Festival 2019 Supported by ありあけ 横濱ハーバー - Ambassador
