= Nozomi Bando =

Japanese dancer, model, and actress (born 1997)

- 坂東 希
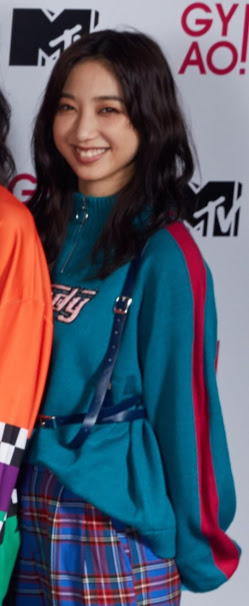
- Bando in 2018
- Born: September 4, 1997 (age 28); Tokyo, Japan
- Occupations: Dancer; model; actress
- Years active: 2010–present
- Agent: LDH
- Style: Fashion
- Height: 1.67 m (5 ft 6 in)
- Awards: Miss Seventeen 2011

Nozomi Bando (坂東 希, Bandō Nozomi; born September 4, 1997) is a Japanese dancer, model, and actress under LDH. She is a former member of Flower and E-girls. Bando is also a former model of Hanachu and an exclusive model for Seventeen.

== Career ==
=== E-girls ===
On July 26, 2011, during an E-Girls Show event in Shibuya-Ex, Bando passed the dance performance department of the Exile Presents Vocal Battle Audition 3 for Girls and was added to Flower as a performer alongside Harumi Sato. On that same day, she was also added as a member to E-girls, having a concurrent position in the group and Flower. On August 30, she became an exclusive model for the fashion magazine Seventeen after winning the Miss Seventeen 2011 audition along with Yua Shinkawa, Ayami Nakajo and Ai Hashizume. In April 2015, Bando ended her work as an exclusive model for Seventeen.

=== Film career ===
On January 12, 2018, Bando was announced as one of the cast members for the live-action adaptation of the manga Rainbow Days. The movie stars her label mate Reo Sano, a member of Generations from Exile Tribe, and was released on July 6. The same year on May 30, she played one of the leading roles in the short film Kuu alongside her E-girls bandmates, Anna Ishii and Nonoka Yamaguchi. The short film was part of Utamonogatari: Cinema Fighters Project by LDH.

On April 15, 2019, Bando was announced to be part of the cast for the film Three Nobunaga (3人の信長, San'nin no Nobunaga), with Exile Takahiro playing the main character; it was released the same year on September 20. The same year on April 23, she was chosen as one of the representative of E-girls alongside Harumi Sato, Kaede Dobashi, and Nonoka Yamaguchi, for the advertisement of Mister Donut's Tapoica Drink – Tap! Tap! Tapioca! – a product released on the same day.

On September 10, 2019, Bando was featured on the cover for the 12th issue of the Japanese fashion magazine Please, making it her first solo cover in her career.

== Filmography ==
=== TV dramas ===
| Year | Title | Role | Network | Notes | Ref. |
|---|---|---|---|---|---|
| 2012 | GTO | Ai Tokiwa | KTV | | |
| 2014 | A Perfect Day for Love Letters | Sese | NTV | Episode 9; Lead role | |
| 2014 | Tokkō Jimuin Minowa | Masami Aoyama | YTV | Episode 11 | |
| 2015 | High & Low: The Story Of S.W.O.R.D. | Nika Ijuin | NTV | | |
| 2016 | High & Low Season 2 | Nika Ijuin | NTV | | |

=== Films ===
| Year | Title | Role | Notes | Ref. |
|---|---|---|---|---|
| 2016 | Road To High & Low | Nika Ijuin | | |
| 2016 | High&Low The Movie | Nika Ijuin | | |
| 2016 | High&Low The Red Rain | Nika Ijuin | | |
| 2017 | High&Low The Movie 2 / End of Sky | Nika Ijuin | | |
| 2018 | Rainbow Days | Reiko Chiba | | |
| 2018 | Utamonogatari: Cinema Fighters Project "Kuu" | Ten | Short film | |
| 2019 | Three Nobunagas | Haru Kuchiki | | |
| 2023 | (Ab)normal Desire | Yume Takami | | |

=== Stage ===
| Year | Title | Ref. |
|---|---|---|
| 2020 | Reading drama Book Act "Entertainer Exchange Diary / Geinin koukan nikki" | |

=== Music videos ===
| Year | Title | Artist |
|---|---|---|
| 2010 | "Kataomoi" | Love |

=== Commercials ===
| Year | Title | Notes | Ref. |
|---|---|---|---|
| 2019 | Mister Donut "Tap！Tap！Tapioca！" | with other E-girls members | |
| 2019 | Mister Donut "Cotton Snow Candy" | with other E-girls members | |
| 2019 | Yofuku no Aoyama | with other E-girls members | |

== Other work ==
=== Runways ===
| Year | Title | Season | Ref. |
|---|---|---|---|
| 2011 | Tokyo Girls Collection | Autumn/Winter | |
| 2012 | Girls Award | Autumn/Winter | |
| 2013 | Kansai Collection | Spring/Summer | |
| 2013 | Tokyo Girls Collection | Spring/Summer | |
| 2018 | Tokyo Girls Collection | Spring/Summer | |
| 2019 | Tokyo Girls Collection Shizuoka | | |
| 2019 | Tokyo Girls Collection Toyama | | |
| 2019 | Tokyo Girls Collection | Autumn/Winter | |
| 2019 | Tokyo Girls Collection Kitakyushu | | |
| 2020 | Tokyo Girls Collection Shizuoka | | |

=== Magazines ===
| Year | Title | Notes |
|---|---|---|
| 2010 | Hanachu | Exclusive model |
| 2011 | Seventeen | Exclusive model |
| 2017 | WWD Beauty | |
| 2018 | Atmos Mag | Spring/Summer issue 13 |
| 2018 | Spring | regular model |
| 2019 | Please | cover, 12th issue |

=== Awards ===
| Year | Title |
|---|---|
| 2011 | 2011 Miss Seventeen |
