= Colorful Pop =

- CD only cover

Studio album by E-girls
- Released: March 19, 2014
- Recorded: 2013–2014
- Genres: Dance-pop; R&B
- Length: 55:52
- Language: Japanese
- Label: Rhythm Zone

E-girls chronology
Lesson 1 (2013)	Colorful Pop (2014)	E.G. Time (2015)

Singles from Colorful Pop
- 1. "Gomennasai no Kissing You" Released: September 25, 2013; 2. "Kurukuru" Released: November 13, 2013; 3. "Diamond Only" Released: February 12, 2014; 4. "RYDEEN ~Dance All Night~" Released: March 5, 2014

Colorful Pop is the second studio album of the Japanese super girl group E-girls. It was released on March 19, 2014, in two different editions.

== Background ==
E-girls announced their second album before the release of "Diamond Only." The album's covers, track list, and release date were later confirmed after the group released the PV for the album's promotional single, "RYDEEN ~Dance All Night~." The album features five previously unreleased songs, including pre-released single "RYDEEN ~Dance All Night~," while the rest of the album features songs previously released as singles or b-sides. The album also includes a Rock Version of the group's single "Follow Me" from their debut album, "Lesson 1."

== Singles ==
Three songs from the album were released as official singles, with one promotional single:

- "Gomennasai no Kissing You" is the first single from the album and the sixth overall. The song was used as the theme song for the movie Shazai no Osama. It was released digitally on September 25, 2013, and physically on October 2, 2013. It features vocals from Dream's Shizuka and Ami and Flower's Reina. The music video featured all members of E-girls alongside over 500 EXPG trainees. The single sold 73,332 copies in its first week and is currently E-girls' bestselling single.
- "Kurukuru" is the second single from the album and seventh overall. It was released digitally on November 13, 2013, and physically a week later. It features vocals from Dream's Shizuka and Ami, Flower's Reina, and Happiness's Karen. The single sold 69,087 copies in its first week.
- "Diamond Only" is the third single from the album and the eighth overall. The song was used as the theme song for a Japanese drama named Koibumi Biyori. It was released digitally on September 25, 2013, and physically on October 2, 2013, in four editions: CD Only Version, CD+DVD Version, One Coin CD Version, and Music Card editions for each member. It features vocals from Dream's Shizuka, Aya and Ami, Flower's Reina, and Happiness's Karen. The single sold 72,808 copies in its first week.
- "Rydeen ~Dance All Night~" is a promotional single released before the album on March 5, 2014. It features vocals from Dream's Shizuka and Erie, Flower's Reina and Happiness's Karen, and samples of Yellow Magic Orchestra's "Rydeen".

== Track listing ==
All editions track list
No.	Title	Length
1.	"Rydeen ~Dance All Night~"	5:31
2.	"Gomennasai no Kissing You" (ごめんなさいのKissing You; "I'm Sorry for Kissing You")	3:40
3.	"Diamond Only"	3:47
4.	"A S A P"	3:27
5.	"Fancy Baby"	3:25
6.	"Sayonara" (サヨナラ; "Goodbye")	3:43
7.	"Mirai e" (未来へ; "To the Future")	4:52
8.	"Chewing Gum"	3:27
9.	"Kurukuru"	3:51
10.	"I Heard a Rumour ~Uwasa Wassap!~" (ウワサWassap!; "Rumours Wassap!")	3:35
11.	"Koi no Boogie Woogie Train" (恋のブギ・ウギ・トレイン; "Boogie Woogie Train of Love")	4:21
12.	"Winter Love ~Ai no Okurimono~" (愛の贈り物; "Gift of Love")	3:47
13.	"Yakusoku no Basho" (約束の場所; "The Promised Place")	4:17
14.	"Follow Me -Colorful Rock-"	4:04
Total length:		55:52

DVD
No.	Title	Length
1.	"Gomennasai no Kissing You" (music video)
2.	"Kurukuru" (music video)
3.	"Diamond Only" (music video)
4.	"RYDEEN ~Dance All Night~" (music video)
5.	"Gomennasai no Kissing You" (Shazai no Osama ending movie special edition music video; bonus video)

== Personnel ==
=== Participating vocalists ===
- "Rydeen ~Dance All Night" – Shizuka (Dream), Erie (Dream), Karen (Happiness), Reina (Flower)
- "Gomennasai no Kissing You" – Shizuka (Dream), Ami (Dream), Reina (Flower)
- "Diamond Only" – Shizuka (Dream), Ami (Dream), Aya (Dream), Karen (Happiness), Reina (Flower)
- "A S A P" – Shizuka (Dream), Erie (Dream), Kyoka (Flower), Yuzuna (Rabbits)
- "Fancy Baby" – Ruri (Happiness), Yuzuna (Rabbits)
- "Sayonara" – Shizuka (Dream), Reina (Flower)
- "Mirai e" – Shizuka (Dream), Ami (Dream), Reina (Flower)
- "Chewing Gum" – Ami (Dream), Kyoka (Flower), Yuzuna (Rabbits)
- "Kurukuru" – Shizuka (Dream), Ami (Dream), Karen (Happiness), Reina (Flower)
- "I Heard a Rumour ~Uwasa Wassap!~" – Shizuka (Dream), Ami (Dream), Aya (Dream), Erie (Dream), Karen (Happiness), Ruri (Happiness), Mayu (Happiness), Reina (Flower), Kyoka (Flower), Chiharu (Flower), Yuzuna (Rabbits)
- "Koi no Boogie Woogie Train" – Shizuka (Dream), Ami (Dream), Aya (Dream), Erie (Dream), Ruri (Happiness), Mayu (Happiness), Reina (Flower), Chiharu (Flower), Yuzuna (Rabbits)
- "Winter Love ~Ai no Okurimono~" – Shizuka (Dream), Ami (Dream), Aya (Dream), Erie (Dream), Karen (Happiness), Ruri (Happiness), Mayu (Happiness), Reina (Flower), Kyoka (Flower), Chiharu (Flower), Yuzuna (Rabbits)
- "Yakusoku no Basho" – Shizuka (Dream), Ami (Dream), Aya (Dream), Erie (Dream), Karen (Happiness), Ruri (Happiness), Mayu (Happiness), Reina (Flower), Kyoka (Flower), Chiharu (Flower), Yuzuna (Rabbits)
- "Follow Me" – Ami (Dream) Karen (Happiness), Reina (Flower), Yuzuna (Rabbits)

== Chart performance ==
The album debuted at number one on Oricon's Weekly Chart with 89,766 copies sold in the first week and has been certified Gold by the RIAJ.

=== Oricon ===
Oricon Chart	Peak	Sales total
Daily albums chart	1	163,836
Weekly albums chart	1	163,836
Yearly Albums Chart	26	163,836

=== Other charts ===
Chart	Peak position
Billboard Japan top albums	1

=== Sales and certifications ===
Chart	Amount
RIAJ physical shipping certification	Gold (100,000+)

== Release history ==
Country	Date	Format	Label
Japan	March 19, 2014	CD, digital download	Rhythm Zone
