= Lesson 1 =

- CD only cover

Studio album by E-girls
- Released: April 17, 2013
- Recorded: 2011–2013
- Genre: Dance-pop; R&B
- Length: 56:53
- Language: Japanese
- Label: Rhythm Zone

E-girls chronology
Lesson 1 (2013)	Colorful Pop (2014)

Singles from Lesson 1
- 1. "Celebration!" Released: December 28, 2011; 2. "One Two Three" Released: April 18, 2012; 3. "Follow Me" Released: October 3, 2012; 4. "The Never Ending Story" Released: February 20, 2013; 5. "Candy Smile" Released: March 13, 2013

Lesson 1 is the debut studio album of the Japanese super girl group E-girls. It was released on April 17, 2013 in two different editions.

== Background ==
The album was announced on February 26, via the group and LDH official websites. It was revealed the album prices and some details about the editions, being released in two editions: limited with a DVD and a regular CD only. On March 18, jacket covers and track list were revealed, the CD including fourteen tracks and DVD including all music videos released up to date and a bonus live video from EXILE's "EXILE Live Tour 2011 Tower of Wish ~Negai no Tou~". The album was also put in pre-order in Japan's iTunes Store, including an acoustic version of the song "Love Letter" as a special pre-order track only. The first press of the CD+DVD edition includes a 64-page photobook. First presses of both editions feature a special packaging and include a card with a serial code which give access to a free wallpaper download though their official website. If codes of the album and their previous release, "Candy Smile", are entered, the page also offers the download for an unreleased song.

== Composition ==
The album is composed by fourteen tracks. It includes three new tracks: "Loving Bell", "Shiny Girls" and "Take it Easy!", all singles released up to date and some b-sides included on the singles.

== Singles ==
Five songs from the album were released as singles:

The first and debut single of the group, "Celebration!", was released on December 28, 2011. The song featured all members from the groups Dream (with former member Sayaka), Happiness (with former member Mimu) and Flower. The single peaked at number seven in Oricon's weekly chart with 18,720 copies sold in the first week.

The second single, "One Two Three", was released on April 18, 2012. The song featured all members from the groups again but without Dream's Sayaka, who withdrawn from the group in March 2012 and Happiness' Mimu, who announced hiatus due to her studies. It is also the first single featuring the dancers Anna Suda and Risa Ikuta, both from EGD (a dance group of EXPG (EXILE' Dance Academy)). A special version of the b-side, "Tadaima!", was also included on the album. It peaked at number twelve in Oricon's weekly chart, selling 18,123 copies in the first week. At the date, it is the group's lowest selling single.

The third single, "Follow Me", was released on October 3, 2012. Due to the addiction of the non-debuted group Bunny and another member from EGD, the number of members increased to 32, which made LDH lead to a new system for the release of the single where the girls were required to undergo a period of training and afterwards, the girls who excelled and fit the image of the single would be chosen to participate. Sixteen members, four vocalists and twelve performers, from all five groups included on E-Girls were chosen for this single. All songs from the single were included on the album. It peaked at number two in Oricon's weekly chart, selling with 30,008 copies in the first week. Although the selling numbers of the physical single being below compared to the single "The Never Ending Story", it is classified as the most successful single of the group at the date due to its digital performance (250 000 downloads).

The fourth single, "The Never Ending Story", was released on February 20, 2013. The song is a cover of Limahl's "The NeverEnding Story". In early 2012 three members from Bunny left the group and the remaining twenty-nine members (except Happiness' Mayu, who went to a hiatus) were included on the single. The b-side, "Just in Love", was first released digitally on December 26, 2012, and later included on the single. The song and its music video were included on the album. It peaked number two in Oricon's weekly chart, selling 40,055 copies in its first week. It is currently the best selling single of the group physically.

The fifth and final single, "Candy Smile", was released on March 13, 2013. The song features twelve members, four vocalists and eight performers, from all twenty-eight members. A special version of the b-side, "Love Letter", was included on the album. It peaked at number six in Oricon's weekly chart, selling 34,764 copies in its first week.

== Track listing ==
All editions track list
No.	Title	Lyrics	Music	Length
1.	"Follow Me"	Shoko Fujibayashi	Jam9, ArmySlick	4:06
2.	"Candy Smile"	Maria Okada (RzC), Litz	CLARABELL (RzC)	4:11
3.	"Loving Bell"	Jam9	Jam9, ArmySlick	4:03
4.	"One Two Three"	Yosuke Nimbari, Shoko Fujibayashi	ArmySlick, Yosuke Nimbari	4:05
5.	"Ready Go"	Yu Shimoji	Kazuhiro Hara	3:44
6.	"Shiny Girls"	Yu Shimoji	Kohei Yokono, ULO	3:45
7.	"Take it Easy!"	Emyli, NA.ZU.NA	ArmySlick, NA.ZU.NA	3:56
8.	"Love Letter" (album special version)	Jam9	Jam9, ArmySlick	5:04
9.	"Suki Desuka?" (好きですか？; "Do You Like?")	Masato Odake	SHIBU	4:37
10.	"Just in Love"	Shoko Fujibayashi	Emyli, NA.ZU.NA	3:26
11.	"Celebration!"	Shoko Fujibayashi	ArmySlick	3:59
12.	"Himawari" (ヒマワリ; "Sunflower"; E-Girls version)	Jam9	Jam9, ArmySlick	4:01
13.	"Tadaima!" (ただいま！; album special version)	Masato Odake	UTA (TinyVoice Production)	4:31
14.	"The Never Ending Story ~Kimi ni Himitsu wo Oshieyou~" (The Never Ending Story ～君に秘密を教えよう～; "I'll Tell You a Secret")	Keith Forsey, Shoko Fujibayashi (Japanese lyrics)	Giorgio Moroder	3:26
Total length:				56:53

iTunes Store pre-order only bonus track
No.	Title	Lyrics	Music	Length
15.	"Love Letter" (acoustic version)	Jam9	Jam9, ArmySlick

DVD (limited edition)
No.	Title	Length
1.	"Celebration!" (music video)
2.	"One Two Three" (music video)
3.	"Follow Me" (music video)
4.	"The Never Ending Story ~Kimi ni Himitsu wo Oshieyou~" (music video)
5.	"Just in Love" (music video)
6.	"Candy Smile" (music video)
7.	"E-Girls Anthem" (Live from "EXILE Live Tour 2011 Tower of Wish ~Negai no Tou~"; bonus video)

== Personnel ==
- Credits are listed on E-Girls official website and in the album's liner notes.

=== Participating members ===
==== Vocalists ====
- "Follow Me" – Ami (Dream), Karen (Happiness), Reina Washio (Flower), Yuzuna Takebe (Bunny)
- "Candy Smile" – Ami, Shizuka (Dream), Karen (Happiness), Reina Washio (Flower)
- "Loving Bell" – Erie (Dream), Reina Washio (Flower), Ruri Kawamoto (Happiness)
- "One Two Three" – Shizuka, Aya (Dream), Mayu, Karen (Happiness), Reina Washio, Chiharu Muto (Flower)
- "Ready Go" – Erie, Aya (Dream), Karen (Happiness), Chiharu Muto (Flower), Yuzuna Takebe (Bunny)
- "Shiny Girls" – Ami, Shizuka, Erie, Aya (Dream), Karen, Ruri Kawamoto (Happiness), Reina Washio, Chiharu Muto (Flower), Yuzuna Takebe (Bunny)
- "Take it Easy!" – Chiharu Muto (Flower), Ruri Kawamoto (Happiness), Yuzuna Takebe (Bunny)
- "Love Letter" – Shizuka, Aya (Dream), Ruri Kawamoto (Happiness), Chiharu Muto (Flower)
- "Suki Desuka?" – Shizuka (Dream), Reina Washio (Flower)
- "Just in Love" – Ami, Shizuka (Dream), Karen (Happiness), Reina Washio (Flower)
- "Celebration!" – Shizuka, Aya (Dream), Mayu, Karen (Happiness), Reina Washio, Chiharu Muto (Flower)
- "Himawari" – Ami, Shizuka, Erie, Aya (Dream), Karen (Happiness), Reina Washio, Chiharu Muto (Flower), Yuzuna Takebe (Bunny)
- "Tadaima!" – Ami, Shizuka, Erie, Aya (Dream), Mayu, Karen, Ruri Kawamoto (Happiness), Reina Washio, Chiharu Muto (Flower), Yuzuna Takebe (Bunny)
- "The Never Ending Story ~Kimi ni Himitsu wo Oshieyou~" – Ami, Shizuka, Erie, Aya (Dream), Karen (Happiness), Reina Washio, Chiharu Muto (Flower), Yuzuna Takebe (Bunny)

==== Performers (as seen on the music videos) ====
- "Follow Me" – Ami (Dream), Karen, Sayaka, Kaede, Yurino, Anna Suda (Happiness), Reina Washio, Shuuka Fujii, Mio Nakajima, Harumi Sato, Nozomi Bando (Flower), Yuzuna Takebe, Kyoka Takeda, Anna Ishii, Nonoka Yamaguchi (Bunny), Risa Ikuta (EGD)
- "Candy Smile" – Ami, Shizuka (Dream), Karen, Sayaka, Kaede, Anna Suda (Happiness), Reina Washio, Erina Mizuno, Shuuka Fujii, Harumi Sato (Flower) Anna Ishii (Bunny), Risa Ikuta (EGD)
- "One Two Three" – Ami, Shizuka, Erie, Aya (Dream), Mayu, Karen, Sayaka, Kaede, Yurino, Miyuu, Anna Suda (Happiness), Reina Washio, Chiharu Muto, Erina Mizuno, Shuuka Fujii, Mio Nakajima, Kyoka Ichiki, Manami Shigetome, Harumi Sato, Nozomi Bando (Flower), Reina Kisu (EGD)
- "Just in Love" – Ami, Shizuka (Dream), Karen, Sayaka, Yurino, Anna Suda (Happiness), Reina Washio, Erina Mizuno, Mio Nakajima (Flower), Kyoka Takeda, Misato Hagio, Rio Inagaki, Nonoka Yamaguchi (Bunny), Risa Ikuta (EGD)
- "Celebration!" – Ami, Shizuka, Erie, Aya, Sayaka (Dream), Mayu, Karen, Sayaka, Kaede, Yurino, Miyuu, Mimu (Happiness), Reina Washio, Chiharu Muto, Erina Mizuno, Shuuka Fujii, Mio Nakajima, Kyoka Ichiki, Manami Shigetome, Harumi Sato, Nozomi Bando (Flower)
- "The Never Ending Story ~Kimi ni Himitsu wo Oshieyou~" – Ami, Shizuka, Erie, Aya (Dream), Karen, Sayaka, Kaede, Yurino, Miyuu, Anna Suda, Ruri Kawamoto (Happiness), Reina Washio, Chiharu Muto, Erina Mizuno, Shuuka Fujii, Mio Nakajima, Kyoka Ichiki, Manami Shigetome, Harumi Sato, Nozomi Bando (Flower), Takebe Yuzuna, Takeda Kyoka, Misato Hagio, Rio Inagaki, Anna Ishii, Nonoka Yamaguchi (Bunny), Risa Ikuta, Reina Kisu (EGD)

=== Music credits ===
==== Lyrics ====
- Shoko Fujibayashi (1, 4, 10, 11, 14)
- Maria Okada (RzC) (2)
- Litz (2)
- Jam9 (3, 8, 12)
- Yosuke Nimbari (4)
- Yu Shimoji (5, 6)
- Emyli (7)
- NA.ZU.NA (7)
- Masato Odake (9, 13)
- Keith Forsey (14)

==== Music ====
- Jam9 (1, 3, 8, 12)
- ArmySlick (1, 3, 4, 7, 8, 11, 12)
- CLARABELL (RzC) (2)
- Yosuke Nimbari (4)
- Kazuhiro Hara (5)
- Kohei Yokono (6)
- ULO (6)
- NA.ZU.NA (7, 10)
- SHIBU (9)
- Emyli (10)
- UTA (TinyVoice Production) (13)
- Giorgio Moroder (14)

==== Arrangement ====
- ArmySlick (1, 3, 4, 8, 9, 10, 11)
- CLARABELL (RzC) (2)
- Yosuke Nimbari (4)
- H-wonder (5, 12, 13, 14)
- Kohei Yokono (6, 7)
- Masaki Iehara (8)
- M.I (9)
- NA.ZU.NA (10)

==== Instruments ====
- Masahi Iehara – guitar, strings arrangement
- Udai Shika – strings

== Chart performance ==
The album debuted at number one on Oricon's daily chart with 18,038 copies sold on the first day and 57,337 copies sold in the first week.

=== Oricon ===
Oricon Chart	Peak	Debut sales	Sales total	Chart run
Daily albums chart	1	18,038	162,269	49 weeks
Weekly albums chart	1	57,337	162,269	49 weeks
Monthly albums chart	3	93,973	162,269	49 weeks
Yearly Albums Chart	40	145,597	162,269	49 weeks

=== Other charts ===
Chart	Peak position
Billboard Japan top albums	1

=== Sales and certifications ===
Chart	Amount
RIAJ physical shipping certification	Gold (100,000+)

== Release history ==
Country	Date	Format	Label
Japan	April 17, 2013	CD, digital download	Rhythm Zone
