= Gomennasai no Kissing You =

- CD+DVD edition cover

Single by E-girls

from the album Colorful Pop
- B-side: "Hatsukoi"; "Fancy Baby"; "Koi no Boogie Woogie Train"
- Released: October 2, 2013
- Genre: J-pop; Dance-pop
- Length: 3:42
- Label: Rhythm Zone
- Songwriter: Yu Shimoji
- Producer: Clarabell

E-girls singles chronology
"Candy Smile" (2013)	"Gomennasai no Kissing You" (2013)	"Kurukuru" (2013)

Professional ratings
Review scores
Source	Rating
Rolling Stone Japan	2.5/5 stars

"Gomennasai no Kissing You" (Japanese: ごめんなさいのKissing You) is a song by the Japanese girl group E-girls. It was released on October 2, 2013, as the group's sixth single and it was released a week earlier digitally as their fifth digital single.

== Background ==
The single release was announced on August 12, 2013, on E-girls' official website, along with release day, prices and editions. On August 30, the website announced more two editions of the single: One Coin CD and Music Card edition. On September 2, jacket covers and track list of the single were revealed. The single features a song of the group Flower, one of the groups included on E-girls. This is the second time a song of a specific group is being included in a E-girls single, with the first being "Dreaming Girls", of the group Dream, included on E-girls' debut single "Celebration!".

=== Editions ===
- CD+DVD (RZCD-59428/B): The CD+DVD edition includes the CD single with all tracks, the instrumental of "Gomennasai no Kissing You" and a DVD including the music video of the song and a making of from it. First presses of this edition comes in an EP package size.
- CD only (RZCD-59429): The CD only edition includes the CD single only with all tracks and the instrumentals of it.
- One Coin CD (RZC1-59430) and Music Card (AQZ1-76017~45): The One Coin CD edition includes the CD single with only the track "Gomennasai no Kissing You" and a different jacket cover. The Music Card includes only the track "Gomennasai no Kissing You" in a special card, only available in Japan. It was released in 29 editions, one per member. Both types were only available to purchase on mu-mo online shop, LDH Mobile shop and at live & event venues.

== Composition ==
"Gomennasai no Kissing You" was written by Yu Shimoji, composed and arranged by Clarabell. "Hatsukoi" was written by Narumi Yamamoto, composed by Chris Meyer, Takumi Tsukada and Grace and arranged by Pochi. It is a song of the group Flower. "Fancy Baby" was written by Kanata Okajima, who also composed the song with Jon Hallgren. "Koi no Boogie Woogie Train" was written by Minako Yoshida, composed by Kanata Okajima, and arranged by Yuta Nakano.

=== Participating members ===
==== "Gomennasai no Kissing You" ====
- Vocalists: Ami, Shizuka (Dream), Reina Washio (Flower)
- Performers: Dream, Happiness, Flower, Yuzuna Takebe, Kyoka Takeda, Misato Hagio, Rio Inagaki, Anna Ishii, Nonoka Yamaguchi (Bunny), Risa Ikuta, Momoka Nakajima (EGD)

== Music video ==
A short version of the music video for the song was revealed on September 9, 2013, on Avex Trax's YouTube channel. The full version was broadcast the following day, September 10, on the music channel M-On!. It features the girls in an amusement park performing the song. The middle part of the video includes a dance battle between the performers of the groups Flower and Happiness, and a special part including the members of the non-debuted group Bunny in marching band outfits. At the end, all the girls made the sign of "apology" in a circle. The music video was directed by Shigeaki Kubo.

== Promotions ==
"Gomennasai no Kissing You" was used as theme song for the Japanese movie The Apology King. The song was also performed on some TV shows, such as Music Dragon and Music Japan. "Hatsukoi", Flower's song, was used as theme song for Samantha Thavassa's Samantha×Kawaii×Art TV advertisement for the month of September. "Fancy Baby" was used as theme song for CX's TV show Mezamashi News during the month of October.

== Track listing ==
CD+DVD edition:
No.	Title	Lyrics	Music	Arrangement	Length
1.	"Gomennasai no Kissing You" ((ごめんなさいのKissing You))	Yu Shimoji	Clarabell	Clarabell	3:43
2.	"Hatsukoi" ((初恋; "First Love") (Flower)	Narumi Yamamoto	Chris Meyer; Takumi Tsukada; Grace	Pochi	3:41
3.	"Fancy Baby"	Kanata Okajima	Kanata Okajima; Jon Hallgren	Jon Hallgren	3:27
4.	"Koi no Boogie Woogie Train" ((恋のブギ・ウギ・トレイン; "Boogie Woogie Train of Love"))	Minako Yoshida	Kanata Okajima	Yuta Nakano	4:24
5.	"Gomennasai no Kissing You" (Instrumental) ((ごめんなさいのKissing You)))		Clarabell	Clarabell	3:42
Total length:					18:54

DVD (CD+DVD edition):
No.	Title	Length
1.	"Gomennasai no Kissing You" (Music video)
2.	"Gomennasai no Kissing You" (Music video - Making of)

CD only edition:
No.	Title	Lyrics	Music	Arrangement	Length
1.	"Gomennasai no Kissing You" ((ごめんなさいのKissing You))	Yu Shimoji	Clarabell	Clarabell	3:43
2.	"Hatsukoi" ((初恋; "First Love") (Flower)	Narumi Yamamoto	Chris Meyer; Takumi Tsukada; Grace	Pochi	3:41
3.	"Fancy Baby"	Kanata Okajima	Kanata Okajima; Jon Hallgren	Jon Hallgren	3:27
4.	"Koi no Boogie Woogie Train" ((恋のブギ・ウギ・トレイン; "Boogie Woogie Train of Love"))	Minako Yoshida	Kanata Okajima	Yuta Nakano	4:24
5.	"Gomennasai no Kissing You" ((Instrumental) ((ごめんなさいのKissing You))		Clarabell	Clarabell	3:42
6.	"Hatsukoi" (Instrumental) ((初恋)) (Flower)		Chris Meyer; Takumi Tsukada; Grace	Pochi
7.	"Fancy Baby" (Instrumental)		Kanata Okajima; Jon Hallgren	Jon Hallgren
8.	"Koi no Boogie Woogie Train" (Instrumental) ((恋のブギ・ウギ・トレイン))		Kanata Okajima	Yuta Nakano

One Coin CD and Music Card track list
No.	Title	Lyrics	Music	Arrangement	Length
1.	"Gomennasai no Kissing You" ((ごめんなさいのKissing You))	Yu Shimoji	Clarabell	Clarabell	3:43

iTunes Store edition:
No.	Title	Lyrics	Music	Arrangement	Length
1.	"Gomennasai no Kissing You" ((ごめんなさいのKissing You))	Yu Shimoji	Clarabell	Clarabell	3:43
2.	"Fancy Baby"	Kanata Okajima	Kanata Okajima; Jon Hallgren	Jon Hallgren	3:27
3.	"Koi no Boogie Woogie Train" ((恋のブギ・ウギ・トレイン; "Boogie Woogie Train of Love"))	Minako Yoshida	Kanata Okajima	Yuta Nakano	4:24
Total length:					11:32

Notes

- The iTunes Store edition does not include Flower's song, "Hatsukoi", due to the group being signed with Sony Music Associated Records Inc., who released the song separately. It also does not include instrumentals.

== Chart performance ==
The physical single debuted at number two in Oricon's daily singles, selling 32,246 in its first day. In its fourth day of sales, the single climbed to the number one spot, selling 8,533 copies on that day.

=== Oricon chart ===
Oricon Chart	Peak	Debut sales	Sales total
Daily Singles Chart	1	32,246	101,404+
Weekly Singles Chart	2	73,332	101,404+
Monthly Singles Chart	8	89,219	101,404+

=== Billboard Japan charts ===
Chart	Peak position
Billboard Japan Hot 100	3
Billboard Japan Hot Singles Sales	5
Billboard Japan Hot Top Airplay	4
Billboard Japan Adult Contemporary Airplay	1

== Release history ==
Country	Date	Format	Label
Japan	September 25, 2013	Digital download (Song only)	Rhythm Zone
Japan	October 2, 2013	Digital download, CD single	Rhythm Zone
