= A Perfect Day for Love Letters =

Japanese manga short story series

- Cover of the first volume of A Perfect Day for Love Letters as published by Kodansha

恋文日和 (Koibumi Biyori)
- Genre: Romantic comedy
- Manga
- Written by: George Asakura
- Published by: Kodansha
- English publisher: NA: Del Rey Manga
- Magazine: Bessatsu Friend
- Published: 2001
- Volumes: 2
- Live-action film
- Released: December 4, 2004
- Runtime: 111 minutes
- Television drama
- Studio: Koibumi Biyori Production Committee; NTV; AX-ON; Studio Blue; LDH Japan
- Original network: NTV
- Original run: January 7, 2014 – March 11, 2014
- Episodes: 10

A Perfect Day for Love Letters (Japanese: 恋文日和, Hepburn: Koibumi Biyori) is a Japanese manga short story series written and illustrated by George Asakura. Each story depicts a relationship that revolves around the use of love letters. The stories were originally published by Kodansha in the shōjo (aimed at teenage girls) manga magazine Bessatsu Friend, and collected in two bound volumes. A Perfect Day for Love Letters received the Kodansha Manga Award for shōjo manga along with Oi Piitan!! by Risa Itou in 2005. A live action film adaptation premiered in Japan on December 4, 2004. It was also adapted into a Japanese television drama in 2014.

== Manga ==
In Japan, Kodansha published both tankōbon volumes in March 2001 (ISBN 978-4-06-341229-1 and ISBN 978-4-06-341230-7). The series is licensed for an English language release in North America by Del Rey Manga. The first published in June 2005 (ISBN 978-0-345-48266-2) and the second in November 2005 (ISBN 978-0-345-48267-9).

== Reception ==
Anime News Network's Carlo Santos criticizes the manga for its characters quirks for being annoying and "occasional clutter layout". However, he complimented the manga for "true-to-life characters". Mania.com's Mike Dungan criticises George Asakura's artwork as "coarse". However he commends the manga for "building the tension just right" in each of the individual stories.
