= Go! Go! Let's Go! =

- The CD+DVD, and digital artwork that commercializes the single.

Single by E-girls

from the album E.G. Crazy
- B-side: "Bon Voyage"
- Released: November 30, 2016
- Recorded: 2016
- Genre: Dance rock
- Length: 4:15
- Label: Rhythm Zone; Avex Music Creative Inc.
- Songwriters: Masato Kotake, Lisa Desmond, Maria Marcus, Erik Lidbom.
- Producer: Exile Hiro

E-girls singles chronology
"Pink Champagne" (2016)	"Go! Go! Let's Go!" (2016)

"Go! Go! Let's Go!" is a song recorded and performed by Japanese collective unit E-girls, taken as a single from their fourth studio record E.G. Crazy (2017). The track was released on November 30, 2016, through Rhythm Zone and Avex Music Creative Inc. in three physical formats—two CD's and a DVD bundle—and for digital consumption. The song was written by Kotake Masato, composed by Lisa Desmond, Erik Lidbom and Maria Marcus, and produced by Exile's Hiro. It is the final single to feature Dream member Erie Abe, whom left the band on December 31 that same year.

"Go! Go! Let's Go!" serves as the opening entry for their Japanese Neo Girls concept, which utilizes different cultures from a Japanese women's perspective. Musically, it is a dance number that incorporates elements of hip-hop and rock music, and delves into themes of being ambitious and moving on. Additionally, the physical and digital packaging included the B-side "Bon Voyage", which was included on the parent album. "Go! Go! Let's Go!" features all remaining vocalists members from the group. Upon its release, "Go! Go! Let's Go!" received positive reviews from music critics, who commended the tracks mixture of genres and production, with compliments aimed towards their incorporation of the Japanese Neo Girls concept.

Commercially, it experienced minor success in Japan, peaking at number two on the Oricon Singles Chart and on the Japan Hot 100, the latter published by Billboard, but selling fewer copies than their previous releases. In order to promote the single, E-girls performed in the accompanying music video, which was directed by Daisuke Ninomaya, and features the band exemplifying the respective concept into the visual; for example, the girls utilize various Japanese cultures. Additionally, the girls sung and performed the track on several shows.

== Background and composition ==
After releasing their "summer concept" singles "E.G. Summer Rider" (July 2016) and "Pink Champagne" (August 2016), E-girls continued recording material for their fourth studio album, E.G. Crazy (2017). On October 20 that year, the band announced through their website about the release of "Go! Go! Let's Go!", and confirmed its pre-order availability that same day. Details were still unavailable at the time, but revealed the three accommodating formats for the single. Additionally, this is the last single to feature Dream member Erie Abe, whom announced her retirement in October from both E-girls and Dream, and the entertainment industry as a whole, by the end of the year; on December 31, Abe committed to her promise and left the bands.

The song was written by Kotake Masato, composed by Lisa Desmond, Erik Lidbom and Maria Marcus, and produced by Exile's Hiro. Musically, it is a dance number that incorporates elements of hip-hop and rock music, and delves into themes of being ambitious and moving on. According to a contributing editor of CD Journal, they felt that the single presented an "edg[ier]" dance sound, and also noted elements of Westernized contemporary R&B music. Similarly, a staff editor from Tokyo Girl Update believed the track "mashed hip-hop and rock" sounds together, and managed to keep within the concept of E.G. Cool, a recurring theme from E.G. Crazy. "Go! Go! Let's Go!" is the third single after "E.G. Summer Rider" and "Pink Champagne" to include vocals from all remaining vocalists from E-girls; these are members Shizuka, Aya and Ami from Dream, Karen Fuiji and Ruri Kawamoto from Happiness, Reina Washio from Flower, and original E-girls member Yuzuna Takebe. Accompanying the single is the B-side "Bon Voyage", which is included on the physical and digital distributions. Composed as soft tropical house–pop number, it features vocals from all singing members.

== Release ==
"Go! Go! Let's Go!" was taken as the final single from their fourth studio record E.G. Crazy (2017) where it featured as the closer to the E.G. Cool disc. The track was released on November 30, 2016, through Rhythm Zone and Avex Music Creative Inc. in three physical formats—two CD's and a DVD bundle—and for digital consumption. The standard CD release, and DVD bundle included both songs; the former formats featured its instrumental compositions, while the DVD only placed the single's instrumental as track number three, and a bonus disc featured the music video. A special One-Coin edition was made available on their website with limited pressings, only including the single and a promotional trading card that ranged from 20 different kinds. Furthermore, a flyer was placed inside the jewelcase that gave access to exclusive merchandise that was available on the band's website. The single was made for digital consumption that same day, but included the first two tracks. The cover art featured all members except Erie Abe; the separate CD and One-Coin editions featured each member placed randomly in front of the song's text, while the DVD package feature all members standing and sitting next to the song's title. Japanese retail store CDJapan had issued first-press editions that included a trading card and sticker for each format, and a limited edition photo album that included each member, including Abe, in their looks from the video, for the DVD packaging. The CD only version featured an A3-size poster of the DVD cover.

== Reception ==
Upon its release, "Go! Go! Let's Go!" received positive reviews from music critics. A contributing editor of CD Journal was positive in their review, commending its mixture of sounds and instrumentation. The review also noted its arrangement and R&B elements, and described it a "new standard" for Japanese music. In an article written from Tokyo Girls Update, a staff member agreed about its choices of genres, but also believed its lyrical content of moving forward "takes on another meaning" since member Erie Abe's retirement announcement. Despite enjoying the track and its B-side "Bon Voyage", Sou of Arama Japan felt the packaging and concept was "unoriginal". Reporting from Musicman-Net, an editor felt it fit the entire E.G. Cool concept, and compared it to the E-girls' single "Pink Champagne".

Commercially, "Go! Go! Let's Go!" experienced minor success in Japan. It opened at number two on the daily Oricon Singles Chart, continuing their streaks of top three positions, but remained unsteady for the remaining six days. Based on these statistics, the track debuted at number two on the weekly chart with 24,170 copies sold, just behind Keyakizaka46's single "Futari Saison", which earned 442,322 sales; this marked the group's lowest first week sales since 2012's "Follow Me". The following week saw a drop in sales, slipping to number 52 and selling 1,803 units. In total, it was present for eight weeks and has sold 28,930 copies, their lowest selling single since their debut years, but ranked the 18th best selling single of December.

The single performed moderately on three component Billboard charts in the same region. It debuted at number 29 on the Japan Hot 100, solely based on streaming and searches on various social media outlets, but fell out the following week. On the week of its availability, the single re-entered the chart and opened inside the top ten at number five, its final peak position, but started to descend quickly. Additionally, "Go! Go! Let's Go!" reached number 16 on the Radio Songs chart and number two on the Hot Single Sales chart, and garnered a similar run to the Japan Hot 100 chart.

== Track listing and formats ==
CD single

1. "Go! Go! Let's Go!" – 4:15
2. "Bon Voyage" ("ボン・ボヤージュ") – 3:31
3. "Go! Go! Let's Go!" (Instrumental) – 4:15
4. "Bon Voyage" ("ボン・ボヤージュ") [Instrumental] – 3:31

DVD single

1. "Go! Go! Let's Go!" – 4:15
2. "Bon Voyage" ("ボン・ボヤージュ") – 3:31
3. "Go! Go! Let's Go!" (Instrumental) – 4:15
  1. "Go! Go! Let's Go!"(music video)

One Coin CD

1. "Go! Go! Let's Go!" – 4:15

Digital single

1. "Go! Go! Let's Go!" – 4:15
2. "Bon Voyage" ("ボン・ボヤージュ") – 3:31

== Credits and personnel ==
Credits adapted from the CD liner notes of the single.

Vocalists

- Shizuka – vocals, background vocals (All tracks)
- Aya – vocals, background vocals, leader (All tracks)
- Ami – vocals, background vocals (All tracks)
- Karen Fujii – vocals, background vocals (All tracks)
- Ruri Kawamoto – vocals, background vocals (All tracks)
- Reina Washio – vocals, background vocals (All tracks)
- Yuzuna Takabe – vocals, background vocals (All tracks)

Performers

- Sayaka – performer
- Kaede – performer
- Karen Fujii – performer
- Miyuu – performer
- Yurino – performer
- Anna Suda – performer
- Shuuka Fujii – performer
- Manami Shigetome – performer
- Mio Nakajima – performer
- Nozomi Bando – performer
- Harumi Sato – performer
- Anna Ishii – performer
- Nonoka Yamaguchi – performer
- Yuzuna Takabe – performer

Music credits

- Masato Kotake – songwriter (All tracks)
- Lisa Desmond – composer (All tracks)
- Maria Marcus – composer (All tracks)
- Erik Lidbom– composer (Track 1)
- Mats Lie Skare – composer (Track 2)
- Exile Hiro – producer (All tracks)
- Shigeaki Kubo – music video director
- Aya – music video producer

== Charts and sales ==
=== Japanese charts ===
Chart (2016–2017)	Peak position
Japan Hot 100 (Billboard)	5
Japan Radio Songs Chart (Billboard)	16
Japan Hot Singles Sales Chart (Billboard)	2
Japan Daily Chart (Oricon)	2
Japan Weekly Chart (Oricon)	2
Japan Monthly Chart (Oricon)	18

=== Sales ===
Region	Certification	Certified units/sales
Japan (RIAJ)	—N/a	28,930

== Release history ==
Region	Date	Format	Label	Ref.
Japan	July 20, 2016	CD; DVD; one-coin CD	Rhythm Zone	
Japan	July 20, 2016	Digital download	Avex Music Creative Inc.	
Australia	July 20, 2016	Digital download	Avex Music Creative Inc.	
New Zealand	July 20, 2016	Digital download	Avex Music Creative Inc.	
United Kingdom	July 20, 2016	Digital download	Avex Music Creative Inc.	
Ireland	July 20, 2016	Digital download	Avex Music Creative Inc.	
Germany	July 20, 2016	Digital download	Avex Music Creative Inc.	
France	July 20, 2016	Digital download	Avex Music Creative Inc.	
Spain	July 20, 2016	Digital download	Avex Music Creative Inc.	
Taiwan	July 20, 2016	Digital download	Avex Music Creative Inc.	
