= Anniversary (E-girls song) =

"Anniversary!!"
- The CD artwork to commercialize the single.

Single by E-girls

from the album E.G. Smile: E-girls Best and E.G. Crazy
- B-side: "Saturday Night (Rock na Yoru ni Mahou wo Kakete)"
- Released: May 20, 2015
- Recorded: 2015
- Genre: J-pop
- Length: 3:55
- Label: Rhythm Zone; Avex Music Creative Inc.
- Songwriter: Hana Utsugi
- Producer: Exile Hiro

E-girls singles chronology
"Mr. Snowman" (2014)	"Anniversary!!" (2015)	"Dance Dance Dance" (2015)

"Anniversary!!" is a song recorded and performed by Japanese collective unit E-girls. It first appeared on their greatest hits album E.G. Smile: E-girls Best (2015), and subsequently served as the single of their fourth studio record E.G. Crazy (2017). The track was released on May 20, 2015 through Rhythm Zone and Avex Music Creative Inc. in three physical formats—two CD's and a DVD bundle—and for digital consumption. The song was written by Hana Utsugi, composed by Sky Beatz, Fast Lane and Lisa Desmond, and produced by Exile's Hiro. "Anniversary!!" is their first single released in 2015 to only feature selective members in the line-up.

Musically, "Anniversary!!" is a J-pop number that incorporates elements of dance rock. Described by their management as a pop entry for the summer season, the physical and digital packaging included the track "Saturday Night (Rock na Yoru ni Mahou wo Kakete)", which is a cover song originally performed by Scottish band Bay City Rollers, similarly sharing the same song title. Vocally, the single features the singing of Shizuka, Ami, Karen Fujii and Reina Washio.

Upon its release, "Anniversary!!" received positive reviews from music critics, who commended the composition and felt it was a suitable tune for the summer season. Commercially, it experienced success in Japan, peaking at number three on the Oricon Singles Chart and Japan Hot 100, the latter published by Billboard. It was certified gold by the Recording Industry Association of Japan (RIAJ) for digital sales of 100,000 copies. In order to promote the single, E-girls performed in the accompanying music video, which was directed by Yu-ya Hara, depicting the girls dancing and camping in California. Additionally, the girls sung and performed the track on several concert and shows.

== Background and composition ==
On January 27, 2015, E-girls management LDH–whom oversees their members and performances– announced a new line-up system titled the E-girls Pyramid, which showed each member in the band and their respective sub-groups: Dream, Happiness, Flower, the original E-girls members, and two yet-to-debut groups Rabbits and Bunnies. With that said, six of the remaining 26-members were moved out of E-girls and into either Rabbits and Bunnies for further training; Yuzuna Takebe, the youngest singer in E-girls, was removed from the line-up and placed in Rabbits. With the new line-up in set, the group announced two new singles: "Anniversary!!" and "Dance Dance Dance". However, unlike the previous releases, both singles introduced an additional line-up change where only specific members were included from the newly-19 member band. (Note: Members Aya, Erie Abe, Ruri Kawamoto, Miyuu, and Manami Shigetome were not featured in the line-up for singles "Anniversary!! and "Dance Dance Dance" for unknown reasons, but did appear in the promotional shots.) It is also one of the final singles to feature singer/performer Kyoka Ichiki, who left the band in October that same year. (Note: Despite not appearing on any promotional activities for "Anniversary!!" and "Dance Dance Dance", she was still part of the band until late-October 2015. However, while she appeared in the promotional photoshoot for the former track, her appearance in promo for the latter single was issued but later pulled by Avex.)

The song was written by Hana Utsugi, composed by Sky Beatz, Fast Lane and Lisa Desmond, and produced by Exile's Hiro. Musically, "Anniversary!!" is a J-pop number that incorporates elements of dance rock. According to their management, the track was noted as a "summer anthem" that highlighted a "fresh" and "positive" feeling. Members Shizuka, Ami, Karen Fujii and Reina Washio provide vocals to the single. Accompanying the single is the B-side "Saturday Night (Rock na Yoru ni Mahou wo Kakete)", which is a cover song originally performed by Scottish band Bay City Rollers, similarly sharing the same song title.

== Release ==
"Anniversary!!" was taken as a single from their greatest hits album E.G. Smile: E-girls Best (2015), and subsequently added onto their fourth studio record E.G. Crazy (2017) where it featured on the E.G. Cool disc. The track was released on May 20, 2015 through Rhythm Zone and Avex Music Creative Inc. in three physical formats—two CD's and a DVD bundle—and for digital consumption. The standard CD release, and DVD bundle included both songs; the former format featured its instrumental compositions, while the DVD only placed the single's instrumental as track number four, and a bonus disc featured the music video. A special One-Coin edition was made available on their website with limited pressings, only including the single and a promotional trading card that ranged from 19 different kinds. Furthermore, a flyer was placed inside the jewelcase that gave access to exclusive merchandise that was available on the band's website. Two digital releases were made for consumption; an extended play that included both songs, and the stand-alone of "Anniversary!!" that was made available worldwide. The cover art featured 14 of the 19 members of E-girls; the separate CD and One-Coin editions featured each member placed randomly in front of a colorful back drop with platforms and palm trees, while the DVD package feature various objects influenced by 1990s culture.

== Reception ==
Upon its release, "Anniversary!!" received positive reviews from music critics. A contributing editor at CD Journal praised the composition of the song, labelling it "fresh" and "summery". Similarly, a member of Natalie.mu complimented its dance sound and felt it had a "positive vibe". Commercially, "Anniversary!!" experienced success in Japan. It debuted at number three on the weekly chart with 42,761 copies sold, continuing their consecutive top three entries. The following week saw a drop in sales, slipping to number 21 and selling 4,464 units, and was present for 13 weeks, selling 53,820 copies by the end of the year. The single performed well on three component Billboard charts in the same region. It debuted at number 90 on the Japan Hot 100—dated May 18, 2015— but gradually slipped through the next four weeks. After a steady two weeks, the single reached its peak position of number three on June 1. Additionally, "Anniversary!!" reached number 14 on the Radio Songs chart and number six on the Hot Single Sales chart.

== Music video and promotions ==
The accompanying music video was directed in California by Yu-ya Hara. According to member Reina Washio, she stated "It’s a music video that will remind you of summer. I hope you’ll check out the little things we’re all doing in the video that really add to the narrative." Additionally, performing member Sayaka choreographed majority of the dancing scenes, and stated that they had performed several routines of jump rope in order to sync perfectly into the backing track. It opens with the girls driving through a coastline, and has an intercepting scene of palm trees. During the first verse and chorus, the group are at a beach house ready to explore the area, alongside activities of surfing, driving and biking. By the second chorus, the band sit together outside, as they watch shooting stars and fairy lights flicker. The second chorus has them standing on a veranda holding boomboxes, while dancing to the track. The final chorus has the girls dancing at night with lanterns, caravans and more fairy lights surrounding them; it ends with member Ami holding a hand-watch, as she turns back and walks back to the beach house.

In order to promote the single, E-girls signed two commercial endorsements to include the track; the first was a partnership with Japanese retail brand Samantha Vegas, which promoted their hand bag collection. Additionally, members Kaede, Karen Fujii, Shuuka Fujii, and Harumi Sato were featured in the television commercial. Its second appearance was for the Prince Hotel & Resort commercial, which the company felt it was the perfect song to illustrate their show. Since its release, it has appeared on two concert tours conducted by the band; its first appearance was their 2015 Colorful World tour, which was subsequently added to the release of E.G. Smile: E-girls Best (2016). The tracks most recent inclusion was their E.G. Smile tour, which was included on the DVD bundle of E.G. Crazy (2017).

== Track listing and formats ==
CD single

1. "Anniversary!!" – 3:55
2. "Saturday Night (Rock na Yoru ni Mahou wo Kakete)" (Saturday Night ～ロックな夜に魔法をかけて～) – 3:19
3. "Anniversary!!" (Instrumental) – 3:55
4. "Saturday Night (Rock na Yoru ni Mahou wo Kakete)" (Saturday Night ～ロックな夜に魔法をかけて～) [Instrumental] – 3:19

DVD single

1. "Anniversary!!" – 3:55
2. "Saturday Night (Rock na Yoru ni Mahou wo Kakete)" (Saturday Night ～ロックな夜に魔法をかけて～) – 3:19
3. "Anniversary!!" (Instrumental) – 3:55
  1. "Anniversary!!" (music video)

One Coin CD

1. "Anniversary!!" – 3:55

Digital EP

1. "Anniversary!!" – 3:55
2. "Saturday Night (Rock na Yoru ni Mahou wo Kakete)" (Saturday Night ～ロックな夜に魔法をかけて～) – 3:19

Digital download

1. "Anniversary!!" – 3:55

== Credits and personnel ==
Credits adapted from the CD liner notes of the single.

Vocalists

- Shizuka – vocals, background vocals (All tracks)
- Ami – vocals, background vocals (All tracks)
- Karen Fujii – vocals, background vocals (All tracks)
- Reina Washio – vocals, background vocals (All tracks)

Performers

- Anna Ishii – performer
- Nonoka Yamaguchi – performer
- Sayaka – performer
- Kaede – performer
- Yurino – performer
- Anna Suda – performer
- Shuuka Fujii – performer
- Mio Nakajima – performer
- Nozomi Bando – performer
- Harumi Sato – performer

Music credits

- Hana Utsugi – songwriter (Track 1)
- Sky Beatz – composer (Track 1)
- Fast Lane – composer (Track 1)
- Lisa Desmond – composer (Track 1)
- Philip Coulter – songwriter, composer (Track 2)
- Bill Martin – songwriter, composer (Track 2)
- Yu Shimoji – songwriter, composer (Track 2)
- Exile Hiro – producer (All tracks)
- Yu-ya Hara – music video director

== Charts and sales ==
=== Japanese charts ===
Chart (2015)	Peak position
Japan Weekly Chart (Oricon)	3
Japan Hot 100 (Billboard)	3
Japan Radio Songs Chart (Billboard)	14
Japan Hot Singles Sales Chart (Billboard)	6

=== Sales ===
Region	Certification	Certified units/sales
Japan (RIAJ)	—N/a	53,820

== Release history ==
Region	Date	Format	Label	Ref.
Japan	May 20, 2015	CD; DVD; one-coin CD	Rhythm Zone	
Japan	May 20, 2015	Digital download	Avex Music Creative Inc.	
Australia	May 20, 2015	Digital download	Avex Music Creative Inc.	
New Zealand	May 20, 2015	Digital download	Avex Music Creative Inc.	
United Kingdom	May 20, 2015	Digital download	Avex Music Creative Inc.	
Ireland	May 20, 2015	Digital download	Avex Music Creative Inc.	
Germany	May 20, 2015	Digital download	Avex Music Creative Inc.	
France	May 20, 2015	Digital download	Avex Music Creative Inc.	
Spain	May 20, 2015	Digital download	Avex Music Creative Inc.	
Taiwan	May 20, 2015	Digital download	Avex Music Creative Inc.	
United States	May 20, 2015	Digital download	Avex Music Creative Inc.	
Canada	May 20, 2015	Digital download	Avex Music Creative Inc.	
