= E.G. Summer Rider =

- The CD artwork that commercializes the single.

Single by E-girls

from the album E.G. Crazy
- B-side: "Kikai Shikake no Bye Bye!"; "Party In The Sun"; "Strawberry Sadistic" (Clarabell Remix)
- Released: July 20, 2016
- Recorded: 2016
- Genre: J-pop; dance
- Length: 4:29
- Label: Rhythm Zone; Avex Music Creative Inc.
- Songwriter: Kotake Masato
- Producer: Exile Hiro

E-girls singles chronology
"Merry x Merry Xmas" (2015)	"E.G. Summer Rider" (2016)	"Pink Champagne" (2016)

Alternative cover
- CD+DVD, and digital artwork to commercialize the single.

"E.G. Summer Rider" (stylized as "E.G. summer RIDER"; stands for "E-girls Summer Rider") is a song recorded and performed by Japanese collective unit E-girls, taken as a single from their fourth studio record E.G. Crazy (2017). The track was released on July 20, 2016, through Rhythm Zone and Avex Music Creative Inc. in three physical formats—two CD's and a DVD bundle—and for digital consumption. The song was written by Kotake Masato, composed by Henrik Nordenback, Christian Fast and Lisa Desmond, and produced by Nordenback with Exile's Hiro.

"E.G. Summer Rider" serves as the opening entry for their E.G. Pop concept, which utilizes a fun and poppier. Musically, it is a J-pop number that incorporates elements of dance and dubstep, and delves into themes of having fun and the summer season. Additionally, the physical and digital packaging included the B-sides: "Kikai Shikake no Bye Bye!" and "Party In The Sun", and a Clarabell remix of the band's promotional recording "Strawberry Sadistic". "E.G. Summer Rider" is the group's first single to feature all remaining vocalists since "E.G. Anthem: We Are Venus" (2014).

Upon its release, "E.G. Summer Rider" received positive reviews from music critics, who commended the tracks sound and production, with additional compliments aimed towards their E.G. Pop concept. Commercially, it experienced success in Japan, peaking at number two on the Oricon Singles Chart and on the Japan Hot 100, the latter published by Billboard. In order to promote the single, E-girls performed in the accompanying music video, which was directed by Shigeaki Kubo, and had the band going on a road trip. Additionally, the girls sung and performed the track on several concert and shows.

== Background and composition ==
After the band's new line-up changes in 2015, as managed by LDH, E-girls released three new singles; "Anniversary!!" (May 2015), "Dance Dance Dance" (September 2016) and "Merry x Merry Xmas" (December 2015). Furthermore, after distributing the promotional recording, "Dance With Me Now!", in December that year, LDH re-added vocalist Yuzuna Takebe to the girl group, and published their first greatest hits retrospect E.G. Smile: E-girls Best in February 2016. In June that year, E-girls announced on their website about two new singles: "E.G. Summer Rider" and "Pink Champagne". Each release would commemorate a separate concept: E.G. Pop and E.G. Cool. The former track incorporated the E.G. Pop concept, which was described by their management as a combination of a "fun" and "pop[pier]" vibe. It is also the first physical single to not include member Erie Abe, whom transitioned to an accompanying disc jockey to specific songs.

The song was written by Kotake Masato, composed by Henrik Nordenback, Christian Fast and Lisa Desmond, and produced by Nordenback with Exile's Hiro. Musically, it is a J-pop number that incorporates elements of dance and dubstep, and delves into themes of having fun and the summer season. Will from Arama Japan agreed, noting that it was a pop song that was set with a "summer theme." According to a contributing editor of CD Journal, they felt that the single presented a "dynamic" dance sound, but also utilized a somewhat "surprisingly restrained emotion" through their vocal performances and lyrical content. All vocalist members are featured in this single, marking their first-full singing appearances together since 2014's "E.G. Anthem: We Are Venus". Accompanying the single are two B-sides: "Kikai Shikake no Bye Bye!" and "Party In The Sun", and a Clarabell remix of the band's promotional recording "Strawberry Sadistic", all which are included on the physical and digital distributions. Composed as pop and dance numbers, the first two songs feature the remaining vocalists, whilst "Strawberry Sadistic" omits Takebe. (Note: Yuzuna Takebe did not sing on "Strawberry Sadistic", but was featured in the music video as a performer.)

== Release ==
"E.G. Summer Rider" was taken as a single from their fourth studio record E.G. Crazy (2017) where it featured on the E.G. Pop disc. The track was released on July 20, 2016, through Rhythm Zone and Avex Music Creative Inc. in three physical formats—two CD's and a DVD bundle—and for digital consumption. The standard CD release, and DVD bundle included all fours songs; the former formats featured its instrumental compositions, while the DVD only placed the single's instrumental as track number five, and a bonus disc featured the music video. A special One-Coin edition was made available on their website with limited pressings, only including the single and a promotional trading card that ranged from 20 different kinds. "E.G. Summer Rider" was made for digital consumption that same day, but included the first four songs. The cover art featured all members except Erie Abe; the separate CD and One-Coin editions featured each member placed randomly on a white backdrop, while the DVD package feature all members placed in a separate square that made up a 5x5 column/row. Japanese retail store CDJapan had issued first-press editions that included a trading card, and an LP-size poster that depicted the CD+DVD cover art.

== Reception ==
Upon its release, "E.G. Summer Rider" received positive reviews from music critics. A contributing editor of CD Journal was positive towards it production, and praised the single's E.G. Pop concept. The review also commended the additional B-side tracks for giving the release a more "exciting" package. Although describing the sound as "dry", the editor felt it worked with the "elegance" of the group. Similarly, in an article written from SBS PopAsia, head staff enjoyed the recording and felt the song was no "better way to celebrate" the summery season. Staff members at AllMusic was positive, and selected the single, alongside "Party In the Sun!" as some of their best musical releases.

Commercially, "E.G. Summer Rider" experienced success in Japan. It opened at number three on the daily Oricon Singles Chart, and stayed there for six more days, their only single to achieve the same positions consecutively in that category. Based on these positions, the track debuted at number two on the weekly chart with 59,666 copies sold, only just behind KinKi Kids' single "Bara to Taiyou", which earned doubled the sales. The following week saw a drop in sales, slipping to number 41 and selling 3,504 units. In total, it was present for seven weeks and sold 68,176 copies by the end of the year, ranking at number 79.

The single performed well on three component Billboard charts in the same region. It debuted at number 16 on July 4, 2016, but gradually slipped downwards through the next four weeks. On the week of its availability, the single rose to its peak position of number two, where it stayed there for a sole week. Additionally, "E.G. Summer Rider" reached number three on the Radio Songs chart and number two on the Hot Single Sales chart, and garnered a similar run to the Japan Hot 100 chart.

== Music video ==
An accompanying music video was directed by Shigeaki Kubo, which has the band going on a road trip during the summer season. The visual opens with different members on different mobile vehicles on a long bridge. (Note: As detailed in the video, published by Avex Group, the members were: Reina Washio, Karen Fujii and Nozomi Bando, Nonoka Yamaguchi and Anna Ishii, Ami and Aya, Manami Shigetome and Mio Nakajima, and Ruri Kawamoto on Mopeds, Shuuka Fujii and Shizuka, and Kaede and Harumi Sato on motorcycles, Anna Suda and Miyuu on dirt bikes, and Yuzuna Takebe, Sayaka and Yurino in a convertible.) An information sign features several directions, which is filled with positive-comments and phrases; the E-girls and "E.G. Summer Rider" logo pops up in amongst the signs. The first verse situates groups of members in different areas; Reina Washio is singing near a beach-side, (Note: This scene features Reina Washio, Shuuka Fujii, Harumi Sato and Kaede.) Ami, Aya and Ruri Kawamoto are seated eating watermelon and drinking smoothies, (Note: This scene features Ami, Aya, Ruri Kawamoto, Mio Nakajima and Nonoka Yamaguchi.) Shizuka and Karen Fujii dance to the track, whilst standing underneath a roof made of umbrellas, (Note: This scene features Shizuka, Karen Fujii, Nozomi Bando and Anna Ishii) and Yuzuna Takebe sings in a convertible. (Note: This scene features Yuzuna Takebe, Sayaka and Yurino.) As the chorus starts, the group perform on top of stacked platforms whilst underneath a rainbow-colored blow-up castle. These scenes are generate throughout the rest of the song, until it hits the bridge section, where the girls park their vehicles near the information sign and watch the sunset. It ends with a bunch of the members riding on the bridge; additionally, as the scene pans to the sky and turns black, stars light up and pans towards a pink-tinted city, which is in fact the opening for the girls visual "Pink Champagne". The clip received positive reviews from numerous publications. An editor from Arama Japan commended the summery vibe, and labelled it "colorful". In a similar article, staff members from SBS PopAsia complimented its colorful style and story. Additionally, the article stated: "the "E.G. Summer Rider" [music video] is a fun little tribute to the Summer months that's bound to warm you up as much as standing out in the sun!"

== Promotion and live performances ==
In order to promote the single, E-girls partook in the Japanese make-up company Kose, which promoted a various range of mascara and make-up tools; members and sisters Karen and Shuuka Fujii appeared in the commercial which premiered on July 22, 2016. The band made an appearance at the MBS Music Festival, where they served as the opening act; they performed "Dance With Me Now!" and "E.G. Summer Rider". Since its release, it made its first concert appearance on the band's E.G. Smile tour, which commenced that same year; it appeared on the triple DVD/Blu-ray set of E.G. Crazy (2017).

== Track listing and formats ==
CD single

1. "E.G. Summer Rider" – 4:29
2. "Kikai Shikake no Bye Bye!" ("機械仕掛けのBye Bye!") – 3:43
3. "Party in the Sun" – 3:15
4. "Strawberry Sadistic" (Clarabell Remix) – 4:14
5. "E.G. Summer Rider" (Instrumental) – 4:29
6. "Kikai Shikake no Bye Bye!" ("機械仕掛けのBye Bye!") [Instrumental] – 3:43
7. "Party in the Sun" (Instrumental) – 3:15

DVD single

1. "E.G. Summer Rider" – 4:29
2. "Kikai Shikake no Bye Bye!" ("機械仕掛けのBye Bye!") – 3:43
3. "Party in the Sun" – 3:15
4. "Strawberry Sadistic" (Clarabell Remix) – 4:14
5. "E.G. Summer Rider" (Instrumental) – 4:29
  1. "E.G. Summer Rider" (music video)

One Coin CD

1. "E.G. Summer Rider" – 4:29

Digital EP

1. "E.G. Summer Rider" – 4:29
2. "Kikai Shikake no Bye Bye!" ("機械仕掛けのBye Bye!") – 3:43
3. "Party in the Sun" – 3:15
4. "Strawberry Sadistic" (Clarabell Remix) – 4:14

== Credits and personnel ==
Credits adapted from the CD liner notes of the single.

Vocalists

- Shizuka – vocals, background vocals (All tracks)
- Aya – vocals, background vocals, leader (All tracks)
- Ami – vocals, background vocals (All tracks)
- Karen Fujii – vocals, background vocals (All tracks)
- Ruri Kawamoto – vocals, background vocals (All tracks)
- Reina Washio – vocals, background vocals (All tracks)
- Yuzuna Takabe – vocals, background vocals (All tracks)

Performers

- Sayaka – performer
- Kaede – performer
- Karen Fujii – performer
- Miyuu – performer
- Yurino – performer
- Anna Suda – performer
- Shuuka Fujii – performer
- Manami Shigetome – performer
- Mio Nakajima – performer
- Nozomi Bando – performer
- Harumi Sato – performer
- Anna Ishii – performer
- Nonoka Yamaguchi – performer
- Yuzuna Takabe – performer

Music credits

- Masato Kotake – songwriter (Tracks 1 and 2)
- Hendrik Nordenback – composer, producer (Track 1)
- Christian Fast – composer (Track 1)
- Lisa Desmond – composer (Track 1)
- Clarabell – composer, remixer (Tracks 2 and 4)
- Shoko Fujibayashi – songwriter (Track 3)
- Rinat Arinos – composer (Track 3)
- Daniel Brecher – composer (Track 3)
- Jon Ernst – composer (Track 3)
- Exile Hiro – producer (All tracks)
- Shigeaki Kubo – music video director

== Charts and sales ==
=== Japanese charts ===
Chart (2016)	Peak position
Japan Hot 100 (Billboard)	2
Japan Radio Songs Chart (Billboard)	3
Japan Hot Singles Sales Chart (Billboard)	2
Japan Daily Chart (Oricon)	3
Japan Weekly Chart (Oricon)	2

=== Year-end chart ===
Chart (2016)	Peak position
Japan Yearly Chart (Oricon)	79

=== Sales ===
Region	Certification	Certified units/sales
Japan (RIAJ)	—N/a	68,176

== Release history ==
Region	Date	Format	Label	Ref.
Japan	July 20, 2016	CD; DVD; one-coin CD	Rhythm Zone	
Japan	July 20, 2016	Digital download	Avex Music Creative Inc.	
Australia	July 20, 2016	Digital download	Avex Music Creative Inc.	
New Zealand	July 20, 2016	Digital download	Avex Music Creative Inc.	
United Kingdom	July 20, 2016	Digital download	Avex Music Creative Inc.	
Ireland	July 20, 2016	Digital download	Avex Music Creative Inc.	
Germany	July 20, 2016	Digital download	Avex Music Creative Inc.	
France	July 20, 2016	Digital download	Avex Music Creative Inc.	
Spain	July 20, 2016	Digital download	Avex Music Creative Inc.	
Taiwan	July 20, 2016	Digital download	Avex Music Creative Inc.	
