= E.G. Crazy =

- Standard cover art.

Studio album by E-girls
- Released: January 18, 2017
- Recorded: 2014–2016
- Genre: J-pop; dance; EDM
- Length: 50:09 (disc 1); 45:50 (disc 2); 95:59 (total)
- Language: Japanese; English
- Label: Rhythm Zone
- Producer: Exile Hiro

studio album chronology
E.G. Time (2014)	E.G. Crazy (2017)

Singles from E.G. Crazy
- 1. "Anniversary!!" Released: May 20, 2015; 2. "Dance Dance Dance" Released: September 30, 2015; 3. "Merry x Merry Xmas" Released: December 23, 2015; 4. "E.G. Summer Rider" Released: July 20, 2016; 5. "Pink Champagne" Released: August 10, 2016; 6. "Go! Go! Let's Go!" Released: November 30, 2016

E.G. Crazy is a double album by Japanese girl group E-girls. Rhythm Zone released it in various formats on January 3, 2017. Prior to the album's release, the group's management team, LDH, released a new line-up system that removed several members from E-girls; as a result, it is the first album without members Chiharu Muto and Kyoka Ichiki due to their personal departures, as well as minimal appearances by Erie Abe, who appeared as the group's DJ. Additionally, LDH president Exile Hiro produced the entire album.

E.G. Crazy is a concept album made up of two separate records, E.G. Pop and E.G. Cool. The former emphasises more bubbly and upbeat J-pop musical elements, whereas E.G. Cool has a more edgier style that incorporates various electronic dance influences. Furthermore, several tracks on the album reference the album's theme, Neo Girls, which combines various international cultures and styles through the lens of Japanese women. Both albums have 12 songs, with a mix of new tracks, B-sides, and cover songs performed by various members of the band.

The album was a commercial success in Japan. It debuted at number one on the Oricon Albums Chart and Billboard Japan Top Albums, and was certified gold by the Recording Industry Association of Japan (RIAJ) for shipments of over 100,000 units. Six pre-released and additional singles from the album were released, and all were successful in Japan; "Pink Champagne," the album's fifth single, was certified gold in Japan. To promote the album, E-girls embarked on their E.G. Evolution concert tour of Japan, which was followed by a live release.

== Background and development ==
On January 15, 2014, E-girls released their third studio album, E.G. Time, which was a critical and commercial success in Japan. Following the initial promotion of the record, the group's management team, LDH, announced a new line-up system known as E-Girls Pyramid, which features each member of the group's respective sub-groups Dream, Flower, and Happiness. Six of the 26 members were removed from E-girls and assigned to pre-debut groups Rabbits and Bunnies for further training. Furthermore, the group's vocalists Chiharu Muto and Kyoka Ichiki left for personal reasons, while vocalist Erie Abe made only minor appearances as a DJ on subsequent group releases, in order to conclude her services before retiring from the group.

Recording for the album began in 2015. Several songs from the album, including "Anniversary!!", "Dance Dance Dance", "Merry x Merry Xmas", and "Dance With Me Now!", were also included and promoted as singles on the group's greatest hits album E.G. Smile: E-girls Best (2016). Following the album's release and subsequent promotional activities, Rabbits member Yuzuna Takabe was promoted as a performer in E-girls and later became the vocalist for new material. Shizuoka, Aya and Ami from Dream, Reina Washio from Flower, and Karen Fuiji and Ruri Kawamoto from Happiness worked together to record E.G. Crazy.Additionally, Abe also sings on the songs "Boom Boom Christmas" and "Express: Do Your Dance".

== Composition and songs ==
Music Samples:
E.G. Summer Rider
A 25-second sample of "E.G. Summer Rider", an uptempo pop number that first represents the E.G. Pop disc and theme.

Cowgirl Rhapsody
A 24-second sample of "Cowgirl Rhapsody", which represents a blend of Western culture in its lyrical content, with influences from French house and techno music.

E.G. Crazy is a concept album composed of two separate records: E.G. Pop and E.G. Cool. According to LDH, E.G. Pop has a "fun", "pop[py]", and "cute" aesthetic, whereas E.G. Cool has a more "sexy", "edgy", and "hot" sound. Furthermore, several tracks on the album refer to a theme throughout the album called Neo Girls, which blends various international cultures and styles through the lens of Japanese women. "Anniversary!!" is a "refreshing" summery dance-rock track on, while "E.G. Summer Rider" is an "exciting" summery pop number. "Saturday Night (Rock na Yoru ni Mahou wo Kakete)" is a Japanese cover song of Bay City Rollers', and appears as a B-side to "Anniversary!!". "Harajuku Timebomb" is a punk-inspired rock song with themes inspired by Harajuku culture.

"White Angel" appeared as a B-side to the album's sixth track, the Christmas-inspired song "Merry x Merry Xmas", whereas "Party in the Sun" appears on "E.G. Summer Rider". The group described "Fascination" as a "stylish" uptempo number, whereas "Kikai Shikake no Bye Bye!" is a B-side to "E.G. Summer Rider". "Strawberry Sadistic" serves as the theme song for the Japanese film High&Low The Movie (2016), while the J-pop ballad "Shukko Sa! (Sail Out For Someone)" is also the closer the group's compilation album E.G. Smile: E-girls Best. E.G. Pop concludes with the cover song "Love, Dream, and Happiness" by the Japanese band Exile.

E.G. Cool begins with "All Day Long Lady," another track based on the Japanese Neo Girls theme. The "cheerful" song discusses Japanese women's working culture. "Pink Champagne" is an electronic dance track influenced by 1980s disco and tropical house music, whereas "Hey! You!" is an EDM track from their "Dance Dance Dance" single. "Caution," one of the album's newer songs, represents a departure from the girls' sweeter image to a more edgier and sexier style, whereas "Boom Boom Christmas," featuring Dream members, is a B-side from "Merry x Merry Xmas." Dream appears on another track, "Express (Do Your Dance)," while "Dance Dance Dance" is a funk-inspired song with dance music influences.

"Bad Girls" and "Cowgirl Rhapsody" are B-sides to "Pink Champagne" that were inspired by EDM. The first is a "futuristic" and "funky" pop song, whereas the second incorporates French house and techno elements. "Dance With Me Now!" is an upbeat dance song with a "powerful" vocal performance from the group. "Bon Voyage" is the album's final B-side, and it is influenced by midtempo tropical music. The album concludes with "Go! Go!" Let's Go!", which discusses the girls meeting new people in the future and is notable for its hip-hop and rock elements.

== Promotion ==
=== Singles ===
E.G. Crazy includes six singles in total, three pre-released and three promoting the album. The first three singles from the album, "Anniversary!!", "Dance Dance Dance", and "Merry x Merry Xmas", were released in 2015 to promote E.G. Smile: E-girls Best. All three singles were critical and commercial successes in Japan, reaching the top five of the Oricon Singles Chart. Furthermore, the Recording Industry Association of Japan (RIAJ) certified "Anniversary!!" and "Dance Dance Dance" as gold after exceeding 100,000 digital downloads. The digital single "Dance With Me Now!" from the compilation reached number ten on the Billboard Japan Hot 100 chart.

After the promotion and inclusion of tracks on E.G. Smile: E-girls Best, Rhythm Zone released "E.G. Summer Rider" as the album's follow-up single on July 20, 2016. Both the physical and digital versions included album tracks and instrumental versions of each song. This is the first release since Kyoka Ichiki's departure in October 2015. It was a commercial and critical success due to its uptempo nature, peaking at number two on the Oricon Singles Chart in Japan and the Billboard Japan Hot 100. A month earlier, a music video featuring the girls driving down a sunny beach was released on YouTube.

On August 10, 2016, Rhythm Zone released "Pink Champagne" as their fifth overall single. Both the physical and digital versions included album tracks and instrumental versions of each song. It received critical acclaim for its sound and production value, as well as commercial success, reaching number two on Japan's Oricon Singles Chart and the Billboard Japan Hot 100. The RIAJ certified it gold after it sold over 100,000 units in the country. An accompanying music video showed the girls in a variety of club-related settings.

"Go! Go! Let's Go!" is the album's sixth and final single on November 11, 2016. Both the physical and digital versions contained album tracks and instrumental versions of each song. It was a critical success but performed moderately, reaching number two on the Oricon Singles Chart in Japan and the Billboard Japan Hot 100, but selling significantly less than previous releases. The music video depicts a variety of Japanese-inspired fashion and was the first single to visually represent the Japanese Neo Girls concept.

=== Appearances and live performances ===
E-girls promoted the album by performing several songs on their 2016 E.G. Smile concert tour, which accompanied E.G. Smile: E-girls Best (2016). E.G. Crazys DVD and Blu-ray releases included a live concert and digifest. In addition, the girls promoted this through a series of radio events in Japan, and made occasional promotional appearances, either alone or in small groups, to support the album, including Music Station, MBS' Music Festival, and MTV. E-girls scheduled a number of TV appearances in Japan in early 2017, the first of which was a live broadcast of their 2015 Colourful World tour on MTV. To celebrate the record's release, Japanese retail store Samantha Vega re-decorated their Shibuya, Tokyo locations with handbags and other accessories previously partnered with the band, as well as including each format of E.G. Crazy; members Harumi Sato, Kaede, and sisters Karen and Shuuka Fujii attended the event.

== Release and reception ==
E.G. Crazy premiered in Japan on January 3, 2017, via AWA streaming services. On January 18, Rhythm Zone distributed it in a variety of formats throughout Japan. All formats included two discs, each with twelve songs. The standard DVD and blu-ray versions included all music videos from each physical and promotional single, as well as "All Day Long Lady" and a short video for "Harajuku Timebomb". A limited edition DVD and Blu-ray release included an additional disc containing live performances from their E.G. Smile tour at Saitama Super Arena, as well as a bonus documentary film on the third disc. Pre-release editions came in a special jewelcase, while limited editions featured a boxset and a 120-page photo book. With the album formats, various merchandise were made available at different retailers throughout Japan.

Hirohisa Nakano photographed the packaging for E.G. Crazy, which depicts the members randomly circling three large neon-lit circles. According to the group's leader, Aya, the placement of each member around the shapes creates a "vortex" of both "enthusiasm" and "crazy" feelings, both of which were "expressed" for the record's release, photo shoot, and, ultimately, the inspiration for the title. Furthermore, she believed that the album's content reflected a variety of "crazy" and "frenzy" aspects of Japanese culture, and she invited both Japanese and international audiences to listen to it.

Prior to its release, Nielsen SoundScan Japan reported that the album had sold over 61,000 units, making it their best-selling effort and nearly doubling the sales of its closest competitor (Hubby Groove by Inaba/Salas), which had shipped 37,000 copies. It eventually debuted at number one on the Daily and Weekly Oricon Albums Chart, marking their fourth consecutive number-one album. According to Oricon, open day sales totalled 45,088 units, with over 93,000 sold by the end of the week. Furthermore, it debuted at number six on the Oricon Digital Chart with 1,624 downloads. It stayed on the charts for 25 weeks and sold over 134,885 copies in the country. E.G. Crazy debuted at number one on the Billboard Japan Hot Albums and Sales chart, selling 89,475 copies in its first week. It was the highest-selling album in terms of physical consumption, the sixth-highest in digital sales, and the eighth-most searched album that week, effectively taking the lead across all formats. The RIAJ certified the album gold for sales of 100,000 copies in the country.

== Track listing ==
E.G. Pop track list
No.	Title	Lyrics	Music	Producer(s)	Length
1.	"Anniversary!!"	Hana Utsugi	Sky Beatz; Fast Lane; Lisa Desmond	Exile Hiro; Nichion	3:53
2.	"E.G. Summer Rider"	Masato Kotake	Hendrik Nordenback; Christian Fast; Desmond	Exile Hiro; Nordenback	4:27
3.	"Saturday Night (Rock na Yoru ni Mahou wo Kakete)" (ロックな夜に魔法をかけて; cover version of Bay City Rollers)	Philip Coulter; Bill Martin; Yu Shimoji	Coulter; Martin		3:16
4.	"Harajuku Time Bomb"	Kotake	Clarabell	Exile Hiro	4:23
5.	"White Angel"	Kotake	Steven Lee	Exile Hiro; Joey Carbone	4:36
6.	"Merry x Merry Xmas"	Kotake	Yadako	Exile Hiro; Dirty Orange	4:29
7.	"Party In The Sun"	Shoko Fujibayashi	Rinat Arinos; Daniel Brecher; Jon Ernst	Exile Hiro	3:13
8.	"Fascination"	Maria Okata	Victor Sagfors; Miwa	Exile Hiro	4:01
9.	"Kikai Shikake no Bye Bye!" (機械仕掛けのBye Bye!)	Kotake	Clarabell	Exile Hiro	3:42
10.	"Strawberry Sadistic" (STRAWBERRY サディスティック)	Norihisa Hiranuma; Litz	Clarabell	Exile Hiro	3:46
11.	"Shukko Sa! (Sail Out For Someone)" (出航さ! (Sail Out For Someone))	Kotake	Clarabell	Exile Hiro	4:01
12.	"Love, Dream and Happiness" (cover version of Exile)	Atsushi; Exiles	Atsushi; Nobu-K	Exile Hiro	4:36

E.G. Cool track list
No.	Title	Lyrics	Music	Producer(s)	Length
1.	"All Day Long Lady"	Masoto Kotake	Mats Lie Skare; Maria Marcus; Lisa Desmond	Exile Hiro	3:36
2.	"Pink Champagne"	Kotake	Dominique Rodriguez; Dsign Music; Anne Judith Stokke Wik; Ronny Svendsen; Nermin Harambašić; Sigurd Rosnes; Courtney Jenaé Stahl; Stephen Stahl; Rie Fujioka	Exile Hiro	3:52
3.	"Hey! You!"	Honorable	T-SK; Liv Nervo; Mim Nervo	Exile Hiro; T-SK	4:16
4.	"CautioN"	Kotake	Ricky Hanley; Rob Derbyshire; Yoko Hiramatsu	Exile Hiro	3:21
5.	"Boom Boom Christmas" (featuring Dream)	Kotake	Makkid; Lauren Kaori; Masaki Iehara	Exile Hiro	3:27
6.	"Express (Do Your Dance)" (featuring Dream)	Kaori	Kaori; Iehara; Kohei Yokono	Exile Hiro	3:24
7.	"Dance Dance Dance"	Kaori	DWB; Nanna Larsen	Exile Hiro; DWB	3:20
8.	"Bad Girls"	Michico	T.Kura; Michico	Exile Hiro; T.Kura; Michico	4:16
9.	"Cowgirl Rhapsody" (カウガール・ラプソディ)	Kotake	Skylar Mones; Jimmy Burney; Sarah West	Exile Hiro	3:48
10.	"Dance With Me Now!"	Michico	T.Kura; Michico	Exile Hiro; T.Kura; Michico	4:50
11.	"Bon Voyage!" (ボン・ボヤージュ)	Kotake	Skare; Desmond; Marcus	Exile Hiro	3:31
12.	"Go! Go! Let's Go!"	Kotake	Desmond; Lidbom; Marcus	Exile Hiro	4:13

DVD and Blu-ray
No.	Title	Director	Length
1.	"Anniversary!!" (Video clip)	Yu-ya Hara
2.	"Dance Dance Dance" (Video clip)	Kanji Suto
3.	"Merry x Merry Xmas" (Video clip)	Seki Ayano
4.	"Dance With Me Now!" (Video clip)	Ayano
5.	"E.G. Summer Rider" (Video clip)	Shigeaki Kubo
6.	"Pink Champagne" (Video clip)	Kubo
7.	"Strawberry Sadistic" (Video clip)	Kubo
8.	"Go! Go! Let's Go!" (Video clip)	Daisuke Ninomaya
9.	"All Day Long Lady" (Video clip)	Ninomaya

E-girls Live Tour 2016: E.G. Smile in Saitama Super Arena Vol.1
No.	Title	Length
1.	"E-girls Live Tour 2016: E.G. Smile in Saitama Super Arena Vol.2 and documentary movie" (Live DVD)

E-girls Live Tour 2016: E.G. Smile in Saitama Super Arena Vol.2 and documentary movie
No.	Title	Director	Length
1.	"E-girls Live Tour 2016: E.G. Smile in Saitama Super Arena Vol.2"	Shigeaki Kubo
2.	"E.G. Smile in Saitama Super Arena documentary movie"	Kubo

== Personnel ==
Personnel details were sourced from the E.G. Crazy liner notes booklet.

Vocalists

- Shizuka – vocals, background vocals (All tracks)
- Aya – vocals, background vocals, leader (All tracks on E.G. Pop expect track 1 and 3, and tracks 3 and 7 on E.G. Cool)
- Ami – vocals, background vocals (All tracks except track 3 on E.G. Cool)
- Erie Abe – vocals, background vocals (Track 5 on E.G. Pop, and tracks 3, 5 and 6 on E.G. Cool)
- Karen Fujii – vocals, background vocals (All tracks except tracks 3, 5 and 6 on E.G. Cool)
- Ruri Kawamoto – vocals, background vocals (All tracks except track 1 on E.G. Pop, and tracks 5, 6 and 7 on E.G. Cool)
- Reina Washio – vocals, background vocals (All tracks except track 5 and 6 on E.G. Cool)
- Yuzuna Takabe – vocals, background vocals (Tracks 2, 4, 8, 9 and 12 on E.G. Pop, and tracks 1, 2, 4, 8, 11 and 12 on E.G. Cool)

Performers

- Sayaka – performer
- Kaede – performer
- Karen Fujii – performer
- Miyuu – performer
- Yurino – performer
- Anna Suda – performer
- Shuuka Fujii – performer
- Manami Shigetome – performer
- Mio Nakajima – performer
- Nozomi Bando – performer
- Harumi Sato – performer
- Yuzuna Takabe – performer
- Anna Ishii – performer
- Nonoka Yamaguchi – performer
- Erie Abe – performer, disc jockey

== Charts ==
Chart (2017)	Peak position
Japanese Hot Albums (Billboard Japan)	1
Japanese Hot Sales (Billboard Japan)	1
Japanese Albums (Oricon)	1

== Certification and sales ==
Region	Certification	Certified units/sales
Japan (RIAJ)	Gold	134,885

== Release history ==
Region	Date	Format(s)	Label	Ref.
Japan	January 3, 2017	Streaming	Rhythm Zone	
Japan	CD; DVD; blu-ray; digital download	January 18, 2017	Rhythm Zone	
Various	Digital download	January 18, 2017	Avex Music Creative	

== See also ==
- List of Oricon number-one albums of 2017
