= Pink Champagne (E-girls song) =

- CD only artwork to commercialize the single.

Single by E-girls

from the album E.G. Crazy
- B-side: "Bad Girls"; "Cowgirl Rhapsody"
- Released: August 10, 2016
- Recorded: 2016
- Genre: EDM
- Length: 3:53
- Label: Rhythm Zone; Avex Music Creative Inc.
- Songwriters: Kotake Masato, Courtney Jenaé Stahl, Stephen Stahl, Sigurd Rosnes
- Producers: Exile Hiro, Skylar Mones

E-girls singles chronology
"E.G. Summer Rider" (2016)	"Pink Champagne" (2016)	"Go! Go! Let's Go!" (2016)

Alternative cover

"Pink Champagne" is a song recorded and performed by Japanese collective unit E-girls, taken as a single from their fourth studio album E.G. Crazy (2017). The track was released on August 10, 2016 through Rhythm Zone and Avex Music Creative Inc. in three physical formats—two CD's and a DVD bundle—and for digital consumption. The song was written by Masoto Kotake and produced by Exile Hiro. Additionally, each addition apart from the one-track format came with the two B-sides: "Bad Girls" and "Cowgirl Rhapsody" which was produced by Skylar Mones, one remix of their single "Dance Dance Dance" and the first three instrumental tracks, respectively.

The concept for "Pink Champagne" was to emphasize a more cooler, sexier and edgier sound than their previous single "E.G. Summer Rider", which was described by Rhythm Zone as fun and poppier. Furthermore, the single was created by a variety of composers, such as Sigurd Rosnes, Courtney Jenaé Stahl and Stephen Stahl, amongst others. Musically, it is an electronic dance number that incorporates elements of 1980's disco and tropical house. Lyrically, it delves into themes of having fun and enjoyment. Upon its release, "Pink Champagne" received positive reviews from music critics, who highlighted the single as one of the group's best releases, and complimented its dance nature and production.

Commercially, it experienced success in Japan, peaking at number two on the Oricon Singles Chart and the Japan Hot 100, the latter published by Billboard. It was certified gold by the Recording Industry Association of Japan (RIAJ) for physical shipments of 100,000 copies, the band's first single to do so. In order to promote the single, E-girls performed in the accompanying music video, which was directed by Shigeaki Kubo, and depicted the band in various club-like locations. Additionally, the girls sung and performed the track on several concert and shows.

== Background and composition ==
In July 2016, E-girls released their single "E.G. Summer Rider" in Japan on both physical and digital formats. It was the first of two concept releases during Summer 2016; "E.G. Summer Rider" was recognized as the debut entry to "E.G Pop", which infuses "fun" J-pop sounds. That same day—which was in fact announced in June that year—the band's label, Rhythm Zone, confirmed the release of "Pink Champagne". It would serve as the debut release of "E.G. Cool", which is influenced by Western music and accompanied with an "edgier" and "cooler" image. Despite its announcement, only the limited one-track edition was revealed, which featured the title track. Then on July 20, the same release date as "E.G. Summer Rider", the group released details of the single; it included two B-sides—"Bad Girls" and "Cowgirl Rhapsody"—and the PKCZ® remix of the girls single "Dance Dance Dance".

"Pink Champagne" was written by Kotake Masato, and was composed by a variety of musical creators, such as Dominique Rodriguez, Anne Judith Stokke Wik, Ronny Svendsen, Nemin Harambašić, Sigurd Rosnes, Courtney Jenaé Stahl, Stephen Stahl, and Rie Fujioka. Musically, it is an electronic dance track that incorporates elements of 1980's disco and tropical house. Conversely, an editor at CD Journal believed it consisted more influences of disco and tropical house music than the former genre. According to the girls website, Rhythm Zone marketed the single to showcase a "cool[er]" sound and appeal, whilst "E.G. Summer Rider" emphasized a more "pop" approach. Lyrically, it delves into themes of having fun and enjoyment, which is loosely based on their initial concept. "Pink Champagne" is the second single after "E.G. Summer Rider" to include vocals from all remaining vocalists from E-girls; these are members Shizuka, Aya and Ami from Dream, Karen Fuiji and Ruri Kawamoto from Happiness, Reina Washio from Flower, and original E-girls member Yuzuna Takebe.

== Release ==
"Pink Champagne" was first premiered on the E-girls website as a streaming track on July 29, 2016. Subsequently, it was released by Rhythm Zone and Avex Music Creative Inc. on August 10, 2016; the single was distributed in three physical formats—a standalone CD, a CD and DVD bundle, and a limited one-track CD—and for digital consumption. The standard CD release, and DVD bundle included all three songs and the "Dance Dance Dance" remix by PKCZ®; the former featured its instrumental compositions of the former three songs, while the DVD format only placed the single's instrumental as track number four, and a bonus disc featured the music video. A special One-Coin edition was made available on their website with limited pressings, which only included the single and a promotional trading card that ranged from 20 different kinds. All first press editions of the physical formats came with a limited edition card, featuring one member out of the 20. On November 16, LDH confirmed that "Pink Champagne" will be included on the group's fourth studio and debut concept album, E.G. Crazy, released on January 18, 2017; the single will be listed on the "E.G. Cool" disc. Additionally, "Bad Girls" and "Cowgirl Rhapsody" were included as tracks number eight and nine, respectively.

== Reception ==
Upon its release, "Pink Champagne" received positive reviews from music critics. A contributing editor of CD Journal noted the singles "lighter" and "mild" sound in compared to their first concept single "E.G. Summer Rider", but were nevertheless positive, labelling it "perfect for the summer". Additionally, he/she complimented its production and highlighted all three original songs—the title track, "Bad Girls", "Cowgirl Rhapsody"— amongst the group's best work. Similarly, KKBox Japan highlighted the three recordings as "hot" releases. A staff editor from Billboard Japan commended the track, labelling its production and sound as "fresh", whilst a review from Tower Records Japan described "Pink Champagne" as an "edg[y]" numbers.

Commercially, "Pink Champagne" experienced success in Japan. It debuted at number two on the daily Oricon Singles Chart, selling 33,454 units and stalled by an entry from Japanese girl-group Keyakizaka46. By its third day, the E-girls' single reached atop of the chart, one of their only releases to achieve this. Based on a six-day statistic, "Pink Champagne" entered the weekly chart at number two, selling 66,028 copies; Keyakizaka46 occupied the top spot again, whom sold 323,066 units with their single. Despite this, it is E-girls' highest first-week sales since 2014's "Diamond Only" with 72,808 sales. The following week saw a slump in sales, sliding to number 32 and selling 2,923 copies. The single was present in the top 200 for six weeks, and by the end of August 2016, it was ranked as the seventh best selling single. As of November 2016, "Pink Champagne" has sold 71,535 physical units in Japan, with Oricon ranking it as the 76th best-selling release that same year.

The song proved to be a success on three competent Billboard charts in Japan. It opened at number 100 on the Japan Hot 100, their lowest debut in that category. However, it skyrocketed to number two the following week, continuing their consecutive top 10 achievements. Despite this, it fell outside the top 40 in its following weeks and continued to slip. It managed to achieved success on the Radio Songs and Single Sales chart, debuting at number 65 and number two respectively; the latter entry was its final peak position. The single reached number five on the Radio Songs chart the following week. "Pink Champagne" was certified gold by the Recording Industry Association of Japan (RIAJ) for physical shipments of 100,000 units, the band's first single to do so.

== Music video ==
An accompanying music video was directed by Shigeaki Kubo, which featured the girls in various club-oriented locations. The clip serves as a continuation from the visual of "E.G. Summer Rider", where they drive along a large-scaled bridge. The scene turns into night, and pans towards a pink-tinted city. Despite a short intro that lasts for one minute, the YouTube cut opens with a cherry dropping into a champagne glass. Throughout each verse, there are numerous locations where the girls perform; a room with large champagne glasses, (Note: This scene features Ami and Shuuka Fujii.) a night-club, (Note: This scene features Shizuka.) a room filled with geometric mirrors, (Note: This scene features Shizuka, Moi Nakajima, Miyuu, Yurino, Sayaka, Reina Washio, Ami, Harumi Sato and Kaede.) a large stage with neon-lights, (Note: This scene features Anna Suda, Moi Nakajima and Kaede. A similar scene, shot with fluorescent visuals, features members Harumi Sato, Shuuka Fujii, Yurino, Anna Suda, Sayaka, Karen Fujii and Kaede.) driving inside the city, (Note: This scene features Karen and Shuuka Fujii.) a room filled with shadows and lighting, (Note: This scene features Aya, Ruri Kawamoto, Manami Shigetome, Yuzuna Takabe, Anna Ishii, Nozomi Bando and Nonoka Yamaguchi.) the balcony of a skyscraper, (Note: This scene features Nozomi Bando and Miyuu.) and chained-swings hanging from the sky, over-top the cityscape. (Note: This scene features Aya, Anna Ishii and Nonoka Yamaguchi.) During the chorus sections, it has the girls dance in a large multi-colored club room that features LED screens and neon-lit infrastructure similar to the one in "E.G. Summer Rider". In contrast to the group's previous single visual, which emphasized a "fun, summery vibe", a member at Arama Japan noted that the visual "shows the group's more mature, sexier side." Similarly, an editor from Natalie.mu described the video's atmosphere as "room[s] that ha[ve] a 1980s disco image." Fujii commented that the choreography is a "different kind of stylish," and hoped to showcase "two sides of E-girls." Throughout the video, the E-girls members were situated in various rooms and locations that had them dance to the song, with exceptions of the vocalists which only captured shots of them singing through the verses:

== Promotion ==
In order to promote "Pink Champagne", it was used on two commercials throughout Japan; it was first featured as the theme song to the Japanese Lawson lottery show, and secondly included as the theme song to Samantha Thavasa hand-bangs; the campaign, titled "Samantha Thavasa meets E-girls", featured members Kaede, Harumi Sato, and Karen and Shuuka Fujii. Additionally, E-girls performed the single on two Japanese television shows; the first being on July 31, 2016 at Shibuya Note, whilst the second at Music Fair on August 6. Since its release, the single was added to the set-list for the girls' 2016 E.G. Smile concert tour.

== Track list and formats ==
CD single

1. "Pink Champagne" – 3:55
2. "Bad Girls" – 4:19
3. "Cowgirl Rhapsody" ("カウガール・ラプソディー") – 3:51
4. "Dance Dance Dance" (PKCZ Remix) – 3:52
5. "Pink Champagne" (Instrumental) – 3:55
6. "Bad Girls" (Instrumental) – 4:19
7. "Cowgirl Rhapsody" ("カウガール・ラプソディー") [Instrumental] – 3:51

DVD single

1. "Pink Champagne" – 3:55
2. "Bad Girls" – 4:19
3. "Cowgirl Rhapsody" ("カウガール・ラプソディー") – 3:51
4. "Dance Dance Dance" (PKCZ Remix) – 3:52
5. "Pink Champagne" (Instrumental) – 3:55
  1. "Pink Champagne" (music video)

One Coin CD

1. "Pink Champagne" – 3:55

Digital EP

1. "Pink Champagne" – 3:55
2. "Bad Girls" – 4:19
3. "Cowgirl Rhapsody" ("カウガール・ラプソディー") – 3:51
4. "Dance Dance Dance" (PKCZ Remix) – 3:52

== Credits and personnel ==
Credits adapted from the CD liner notes of the single.

Vocalists

- Shizuka – vocals, background vocals (All tracks)
- Aya – vocals, background vocals, leader (All tracks)
- Ami – vocals, background vocals (All tracks)
- Karen Fujii – vocals, background vocals (All tracks)
- Ruri Kawamoto – vocals, background vocals (All tracks)
- Reina Washio – vocals, background vocals (All tracks)
- Yuzuna Takabe – vocals, background vocals (All tracks)

Performers

- Sayaka – performer
- Kaede – performer
- Karen Fujii – performer
- Miyuu – performer
- Yurino – performer
- Anna Suda – performer
- Shuuka Fujii – performer
- Manami Shigetome – performer
- Mio Nakajima – performer
- Nozomi Bando – performer
- Harumi Sato – performer
- Anna Ishii – performer
- Nonoka Yamaguchi – performer
- Yuzuna Takabe – performer

Music credits

- Kotake Masato – songwriter (Tracks 1 and 3)
- Dominique Rodriguez – composer (Tracks 1)
- Anne Judith Stokke Wik – composer (Tracks 1)
- Ronny Svendsen – composer (Tracks 1)
- Nermin Harambašić – composer (Tracks 1)
- Sigurd Røsnes – composer (Tracks 1)
- Courtney Jenaé Stahl – composer (Tracks 1)
- Stephen Stahl – composer (Tracks 1)
- Rie Fujioka – composer (Tracks 1)
- T.Kura – composer (Tracks 2)
- Michico – songwriter, composer (Tracks 2)
- Skylar Mones – composer (Tracks 3)
- Jimmy Burney – composer (Tracks 3)
- Sarah West – composer (Tracks 3)
- Lauren Kaori – songwriter (Track 4)
- PKCZ® – composer, remixer (Track 4)
- Exile Hiro – producer (All tracks)
- Shigeaki Kubo – music video

== Charts and sales ==
=== Japanese charts ===
Chart (2016)	Peak position
Japan Hot 100 (Billboard)	2
Japan Daily Chart (Oricon)	1
Japan Weekly Chart (Oricon)	2
Japan Monthly Chart (Oricon)	7

=== Year-end charts ===
Chart (2016)	Peak position
Japan Yearly Chart (Oricon)	76

=== Certifications ===
Region	Certification	Certified units/sales
Japan (RIAJ)	Gold	100,000^{^}
^{^} Shipments figures based on certification alone.

== Release history ==
Region	Date	Format	Label
Japan	August 10, 2016	CD; DVD; digital download	Rhythm Zone
United States	August 10, 2016	Digital download	Avex Music Creative Inc.
Australia	August 10, 2016	Digital download	Avex Music Creative Inc.
New Zealand	August 10, 2016	Digital download	Avex Music Creative Inc.
Canada	August 10, 2016	Digital download	Avex Music Creative Inc.
United Kingdom	August 10, 2016	Digital download	Avex Music Creative Inc.
Germany	August 10, 2016	Digital download	Avex Music Creative Inc.
Ireland	August 10, 2016	Digital download	Avex Music Creative Inc.
France	August 10, 2016	Digital download	Avex Music Creative Inc.
Spain	August 10, 2016	Digital download	Avex Music Creative Inc.
Taiwan	August 10, 2016	Digital download	Avex Music Creative Inc.
