= Dance with Me Now! =

Promotional single by E-girls

from the album E.G. Smile: E-girls Best and E.G. Crazy
- Released: February 10, 2016
- Recorded: 2015; Avex Trax Studios (Minato-ku, Tokyo, Japan)
- Genre: Electronic dance music
- Length: 4:50
- Label: Avex Music Creative Inc.; Rhythm Zone
- Songwriter: Michico
- Producers: Michico; T.Kura; Exile Hiro

"Dance with Me Now!" (stylized in all caps in digital formats) is a song recorded and performed by Japanese musical unit E-girls. It was released by Rhythm Zone and Avex Music Creative Inc. on February 10, 2016 as a promotional single to their first greatest hits album, E.G. Smile: E-girls Best (2016). The concept for the single was to emphasize a cooler, sexier and edgier image than their previous singles, which was then later developed and included onto the band's fourth studio and concept album, E.G. Crazy (2017).

The recording was written and co-composed by Japanese artist Michico, with additional music and production credits to her husband T.Kura, and Exile's Hiro. Musically, it is an electronic dance tune that incorporates elements of electropop. Influenced by the night club scene, the lyrical content delves into themes of enjoyment, partying and dancing. Upon its release, "Dance with Me Now!" received favorable reviews from most music critics, whom commended its dance-ready nature but criticized the production.

Commercially, "Dance with Me Now!" experienced success in Japan, reaching the top ten on both the Japan Hot 100 and Radio Songs chart, hosted by Billboard magazine. An accompanying music video was directed by Ayano Seki, featuring E-girls' vocalists and performers in different locations inside a nightclub. Dubbed their most choreographed visual to date, it received lauded reviews from commentators, who praised the set-out and dance sequences. In order to promote it, E-girls performed the track on several television shows and concerts, alongside one commercial in Japan.

== Background and development ==
In early–mid 2015, several changes were made to the line-up of E-girls; the group's management, LDH, revealed a new format called the E-girls Pyramid, detailing the set out of each group and member within E-girls (such as the members of Dream, Happiness, Flower, and sole E-girls members). With that said, six of the original members were moved back to a "trainee" level and allocated them in either yet-to-debut groups, Rabbits and Bunnies; E-girls youngest vocalist, Yuzuna Takabe, was also removed from E-girls. Additionally, Dream's Erie Abe graduated from participating as a vocalist/performer, and changed her position to a disc jockey, whilst vocalist Kyoka Ichiki graduated from both the group and Flower; this left Reina Washio as E-girl's only singer within the sub-group Flower. As a 19-member group, E-girl's released two singles within 2015: "Anniversary!" (May 2015) and "Dance Dance Dance" (September 2015).

In December 2015, LDH announced plans of a greatest hits album titled E.G. Smile: E-girls Best, with three new recordings. However, the single that promoted the retrospect was "Merry Merry Xmas!", which was a critical and commercial success in Japan. Furthermore, their management revealed the track listing, which included "Dance with Me Now!" as one of the three new songs. The single was released as a promotional track on December 31, 2015 on Recochoku, and worldwide on February 10, 2016, the same date as E.G. Smile: E-girls Best (2016). It also remarks a return of Takabe, whom LDH promoted back into the unit by the end of December 2015. On November 16, LDH confirmed that "Dance with Me Now!" will be included on the group's fourth studio and debut concept album, E.G. Crazy, released on January 18, 2017; the single will be listed on the "E.G. Cool" disc.

== Composition and critical response ==
"Dance with Me Now!" was written by Japanese musician Michico, whilst production and composing was handled by herself and her husband, T. Kura; the latter was responsible for arranging the recording. Although Yuzuna Takabe, a vocalist, was added back into the line-up, she did not provided vocals; as a result, it included vocals by the remaining singing members: Shizuka, Aya, Ami (associating Dream members), Karen Fuiji, Ruri Kawamoto (associating Happiness members), and Reina Washio (associating Flower member). Musically, it is an electronic dance track that incorporates elements of club music and culture. According to a member from CD Journal, they noted that all the material from E.G. Smile: E-girls Best was dance music. A few critics, such as Patrick St. Michel and Leonel Manzanares, noted musical elements of EDM and additional pop sounds. Lyrically, it delves into themes of enjoyment and dancing. Additionally, the language of the track was set primarily in English, with some verses and pre-choruses featuring Japanese.

== Commercial performance ==
Commercially, "Dance with Me Now!" experienced success in Japan. It debuted at number 35 on the Japan Hot 100 with 1,525 digital sales, which is hosted by Billboard magazine; subsequently, it was the group's second highest entry on the chart, with their singles "Dance Dance Dance" and "Merry Merry Xmas" positioned at number 51 and number 20 respectively. The following week—dated January 18, 2016—dropped to number 99, the biggest drops of that charting week, and was its final position in that month. On February 1, it re-entered at number 71 and shifted two positions higher the following week. After the singles wide digital distribution on February 10, it rose to number 41 and peaked at number 10 during its six week. Overall, "Dance with Me Now!" spent 13 weeks in the top 100; it sold 10,537 copies. (Note: These sales are published by GfK Japan on Billboard Japan Hot 100; visit references on the Commercial response of each week to view sales.) On the Radio Songs chart, it entered at number 57 for a sole week. On February 15, it re-entered the top 100 chart at number 66, based on the tracks general availability five days prior. It reached number eight the following week, its final peak position, and descended its way out.

== Music video ==
A distance shot of E-girls performing "Dance with Me Now!" in a night club, surrounded by on-goers. The dance sequence was heavily praised by critics.

An accompanying music video was directed by Ayano Seki and released on December 31, 2015 via YouTube. In preparation of the video, E-girls wanted to make it their best video in terms of choreography and dancing. According to member Ami Nakashima, she stated that dance was probably their "best dancing in history." The singer also believed that the choreography takes more attention than the song itself. The visual also marks a return to member and vocalist Yuzuna Takebe, whom was removed from the E-girls liner early in January 2015 to undergo further "training" in the yet-to-debut group Bunnies; their management re-added her to the unit, but was placed as a performer because of scheduling issues with "Dance with Me Now!". Additionally, the video marks the final appearance of E-girls member Erie Abe, whom changed her position as a vocalist/performer to disc jockey; in the video, she performs as a DJ.

The visual opens with member Shizuka exiting a large black vehicle. As the song starts, several close-up shots have each member of the group in different areas. The first set of performers are situated near the black vehicle, enclosed by two concrete walls and a chandler hanging over top. (Note: These performers are: Shizuka and Ruri Kawamoto (vocalists), and Mio Nakajima, Manami Shigetome, Yurino, Anna Suda, Sayaka, Miyuu and Yuzuna Takebe.) Further scenes have them performing in front of a large LED screen, standing upon a large metal infrastructure. (Note: These performers are: Ami Nakashima, Karen Fujii and Reina Washio (vocalists), and Shuuka Fujii, Kaede and Harumi Sato.) (Note: In a further scene similar, the performers are: Karen Fujii, Ami Nakashima, Ami and Reina Washio (vocalists), and Anni Ishii, Nonoka Yamaguchi and Nozomi Bando.) A purple eclipse appears, with member Shuuka Fujii noticing this; it zooms into a large fortress, showcasing all 20-members dancing in a neon-lit club with several on-goers supporting the performers. During the second chorus and bridge section, it has the performing members dance in front of the infrastructure with LED lights projecting against them. (Note: This scene features each performer apart from the vocalists, whom are Shizuka, Ami Nakashima, Aya, Reina Washio, Karen Fujii and Ruri Kawamoto.) By the final chorus, it has all members on the dance floor moving to the track, and ends with the girls performing an instrumental solo in front of on-goers.

Upon the videos release, it garnered strong reviews from commentators and publications, many of whom lauded the choreography and the set-out. A member at Musicman-Net complimented the landscape, and said that it was a "must-see." An author from Tokyo Girls Update believed that it was "the most powerful [music video] in their 4 year history", commending the decision to utilize night clubs and choreography. However, the only negative notes they pointed out was the excessive usage of dancing shots by each performer. Similarly, Arama Japan believed the visual brought out the group's "stronger side". An editor of Asian Junkie praised the club concept and the dance sequences.

== Promotion ==
In order to promote the track, E-girls performed "Dance with Me Now!" on several television shows, such as special events hosted by NHK Japan, Music Fair, and Music On! TV, amongst many others. The group sung it live on the Summer Song Festival 2016, hosted by Fuji Network System (FNS); it featured every member apart from Erie Abe. The single was then added to the setlist for the girls' 2016 E.G. Smile concert tour, having been placed as the introduction track. Additionally, "Dance with Me Now!" was used as the commercial theme song to the 2016 Summer and Spring Samantha Thavasa handbag collection; the campaign was titled Samantha Vega meets E-girls. Space Shower TV had broadcast the video for "Dance with Me Now!" on repeat rotation between the dates February 16–February 29, one of the heaviest rotations of a single that month.

== Credits and personnel ==
Credits adapted from the CD liner notes of the single.

Members

- Shizuka – vocals, background vocals, performer
- Aya – vocals, background vocals, performer
- Ami – vocals, background vocals, performer
- Karen Fujii – vocals, background vocals, performer
- Reina Washio – vocals, background vocals, performer
- Ruri Kawamoto – vocals, background vocals, performer
- Erie Abe – performer
- Yuzuna Takebe – performer
- Anna Ishii – performer
- Nonoka Yamaguchi – performer
- Sayaka – performer
- Kaede – performer
- Miyuu – performer
- Yurino – performer
- Anna Suda – performer
- Shuuka Fujii – performer
- Manami Shigetome – performer
- Mio Nakajima – performer
- Nozomi Bando – performer
- Harumi Sato – performer

Music credits

- Michico – songwriting, composing, production
- T.Kura – composing, production
- Exile Hiro – production
- Erie Abe – DJ
- Ayano Seki – music video director

== Charts and sales ==
=== Billboard charts ===
Chart (2016)	Peak position
Japan Hot 100 (Billboard)	10
Japan Radio Songs (Billboard)	8

=== Sales ===
Region	Certification	Certified units/sales
Japan digital sales	—	10,537
