= Juicy Love =

Juicy Love may refer to:

- Juicy Love (The Grace song)
- Juicy Love (Happiness song)
