= Dance Dance Dance (E-girls song) =

- The digital and CD/DVD artwork to commercialize the single.

Single by E-girls

from the album E.G. Smile: E-girls Best and E.G. Crazy
- B-side: "Hey You"; "Express (Do Your Dance)"
- Released: September 30, 2015
- Recorded: 2015
- Genre: Dance
- Length: 3:23
- Label: Rhythm Zone; Avex Music Creative Inc.
- Songwriter: Lauren Kaori
- Producer: Exile Hiro

E-girls singles chronology
| "Anniversary!!" (2015) | "Dance Dance Dance" (2015) | "Merry x Merry Xmas" (2015) |

"Dance Dance Dance" is a song recorded and performed by Japanese collective unit E-girls. It first appeared on their greatest hits album E.G. Smile: E-girls Best (2015), and subsequently served as the single of their fourth studio record E.G. Crazy (2017). The track was released on September 30, 2015 through Rhythm Zone and Avex Music Creative Inc. in three physical formats—two CD's and a DVD bundle—and for digital consumption. The song was written by Lauren Kaori, composed by DWB and Nanna Larsen, and produced by DWB with Exile's Hiro. "Dance Dance Dance" is their second single released in 2015, with "Anniversary!!", to only feature selective members in the line-up.

Musically, "Dance Dance Dance" was described by music critics as a departure from their traditional J-pop style, and blends contemporary dance music with funk and disco. Additionally, the physical and digital packaging included the dance numbers "Hey! You!" and "Express (Do Your Dance)", the latter being a duet with the E-girls sub-group Dream, and both heavily influenced by electronic dance. Vocally, the first single only features the singing Shizuka, Ami, Karen Fujii and Reina Washio.

Upon its release, "Dance Dance Dance" received positive reviews from music critics, who commended the group's transition to dance music, and praised their vocal abilities. However, some did argue against the vocal performances and choices. Commercially, it experienced moderate success in Japan, peaking at number four on the Oricon Singles Chart and number three on the Japan Hot 100, published by Billboard. In order to promote the single, E-girls performed in the accompanying music video, which was directed by Kanji Suto, and depicted the band in a casino-like set-up. Additionally, the girls sung and performed the track on several concert and shows.

== Background and composition ==
On January 27, 2015, E-girls management LDH–whom oversees their members and performances– announced a new line-up system titled the E-girls Pyramid, which showed each member in the band and their respective sub-groups: Dream, Happiness, Flower, the original E-girls members, and two yet-to-debut groups Rabbits and Bunnies. With that said, six of the remaining 26-members were moved out of E-girls and into either Rabbits and Bunnies for further training; Yuzuna Takebe, the youngest singer in E-girls, was removed from the line-up and placed in Rabbits. With the new line-up in set, the group announced two new singles: "Anniversary!!", which premiered in May that year, and "Dance Dance Dance". However, unlike the previous releases, both singles introduced an additional line-up change where only specific members were included from the newly-19 member band. (Note: Members Aya, Erie Abe, Ruri Kawamoto, Miyuu, and Manami Shigetome were not featured in the line-up for singles "Anniversary!! and "Dance Dance Dance" for unknown reasons, but did appear in the promotional shots.) It is also the final single to feature singer/performer Kyoka Ichiki, who left the band the following month of the single's release. (Note: Despite not appearing on any promotional activities for "Dance Dance Dance", she was still part of the band until late-October 2015.)

The song was written by Lauren Kaori, composed by DWB and Nanna Larsen, and produced by DWB with Exile's Hiro. Musically, "Dance Dance Dance" was described by music critics as a departure from their traditional J-pop style, and blends contemporary dance music with funk and disco. However, as a performing number, their management said the track was to primarily highlight their dancing skills, as shown in the accompany music video. Members Shizuka, Ami, Karen Fujii and Reina Washio provide vocals to the single, marking their second consecutive performance after "Anniversary!!". Accompanying the single are two B-sides: "Hey! You!" and "Express (Do Your Dance)", both of which are included on the physical and digital distributions. Both heavily influenced by electronic dance music, the former features vocalists Shizuka, Erie Abe, Washio and Ruri Kawamoto, whilst "Express (Do Your Dance)" is sung by all Dream members; "Hey! You!" is the final vocal performance by Erie, whom graduated as a vocalist/performer to a disc jockey to the band. (Note: "Hey! You!" is an E-girls song, so it appears as member Erie Abe's final recording with them since her change to become a disc jockey. The second B-side "Express (Do Your Dance)" was a duet between Dream and E-girls, whereas Abe continued providing vocals with Dream only.)

== Release ==
"Dance Dance Dance" was taken as a single from their greatest hits album E.G. Smile: E-girls Best (2015), and subsequently added onto their fourth studio record E.G. Crazy (2017) where it featured on the E.G. Cool disc. The track was released on September 30, 2015 through Rhythm Zone and Avex Music Creative Inc. in three physical formats—two CD's and a DVD bundle—and for digital consumption. The standard CD release, and DVD bundle included all three songs; the former featured its instrumental compositions, while the DVD only placed the single's instrumental as track number four, and a bonus disc featured the music video. A special One-Coin edition was made available on their website with limited pressings, only including the single and a promotional trading card that ranged from 19 different kinds. Two digital releases were made for consumption; an extended play that included all three songs, and the stand-alone of "Dance Dance Dance" that was made available in North America. The cover art featured 14 of the 19 members of E-girls; the separate CD and One-Coin editions featured each member placed randomly on a black back-drop, while the DVD package feature all members together in front of various objects such as disco balls, trumpets, and other musical instrumentals.

== Reception ==
Upon its release, "Dance Dance Dance" received positive reviews from music critics. A contributing editor at CD Journal praised the girls transition from their typical J-pop sound to dance music, describing the production as "gorgeous". Additionally, the editor believed the track "sybolized" a new "depth" and "breathe" to the group's music. In an article written for The AU Review, Chantelle Yeung agreed, and complimented it as a "groovy number". In a similar review, a member from Arama Japan wrote "Not only is the song and concept retro, but sexy as well which gives it them an adult-ish coolness." However, a staff member from Asian Junkie was critical on parts of the vocal performances. He/she examined that member Ami should have been replaced with another vocalist from the group, describing her voice as "distracting" for the song's "soulful tune".

Commercially, "Dance Dance Dance" experienced moderate success in Japan. It opened at number two on the daily Oricon Singles Chart, their second consecutive single to achieve this after "Anniversary!!". After a six-day run, the track debuted at number four on the weekly chart with 46,378 copies sold, their third number to miss the top three. The following week saw a drop in sales, slipping to number 25 and selling 3,156 units, and stayed there for its third run with 1,843 sales. In total, it was present for 16 weeks and sold 56,219 copies by the end of the year. Since its release, it has achieved 58,113 sales. The single performed well on three component Billboard charts in the same region. It debuted at number 33 on September 14, 2015, but gradually slipped through the next four weeks. During its fifth week, the single entered the top ten and peaked at number three. Additionally, "Dance Dance Dance" reached number three on the Radio Songs chart and number 11 on the Hot Single Sales chart.

== Music video ==
An accompanying music video was directed by Kanji Suto, which depicts the members in a casino-like club. According to singer Ami, the track focuses primarily on the group's dancing efforts as a result of their experimentation of "disco-funk" music. Furthermore, performing member commented that the atmosphere of the clip was similar to a movie and noticed the amount of consistent "glowing costumes". The visual opens with the girls getting reading to perform on stage, applying make-up and getting dressed, whilst members Sayaka and Yurino introduce the audience by dancing in a window. As the "E.G." neon logo turns vibrant pink, dancers Anna Suda, Mio Nakajima and Kaede dance in tailored suits while Karen Fujii, Ami, Reina Washio and Shizuka sing in the background. Shuuka Fujii, Harumi Sato and Nozomi Bando appear with pink-and-black feathered dresses to dance, and as the chorus starts, the final members Nonoka Yamaguchi and Anna Ishii move alongside the other girls. From the second verse onwards, it shows the group in various backstage areas getting ready while performing the number. By the bridge, Washio and Ami sit in the middle of the stage where two spotlights are shun over them. The final scene has them all together dancing to the track, moonwalking and other various dance moves, and goes black after the track finishes. In a review by Arama Japan, they compared the group's overall performance to the work of their brother group, Exile.

== Promotion and live performances ==
In order to promote the single, E-girls conducted a series of concert shows and endorsement deals. The track was used as the ending theme songs to two Japanese shows; the Huis Ten Bosch commercial advertisements, and to TV Asahi's Wish! Ranking. At the end of 2015, E-girls were invited to perform a third time at Kōhaku Uta Gassen, and sung "Dance Dance Dance". Additionally, it was performed on another year-end special through Japan's CDTV So far, the band have included the recording on one of their concert tours; the E.G. Smile 2016 show, where it appeared as an encore number. The track was included on every tour date, and subsequently added onto their live release that coincided with the triple DVD/Blu-ray bundles for E.G. Crazy.

== Track listing and formats ==
CD single

1. "Dance Dance Dance" – 3:23
2. "Hey! You" – 4:18
3. "Express (Do Your Dance)" [Dream & E-girls] – 3:26
4. "Dance Dance Dance" (Instrumental) – 3:23
5. "Hey! You" (Instrumental) – 4:18
6. "Express (Do Your Dance)" [Dream & E-girls; Instrumental] – 3:26

DVD single

1. "Dance Dance Dance" – 3:23
2. "Hey! You" – 4:18
3. "Express (Do Your Dance)" [Dream & E-girls] – 3:26
4. "Dance Dance Dance" (Instrumental) – 3:23
5. "Hey! You" (Instrumental) – 4:18
6. "Express (Do Your Dance)" [Dream & E-girls; Instrumental] – 3:26
  1. "Dance Dance Dance" (music video)

One Coin CD

1. "Dance Dance Dance" – 3:23

Digital EP

1. "Dance Dance Dance" – 3:23
2. "Hey! You" – 4:18
3. "Express (Do Your Dance)" [Dream & E-girls] – 3:26

Digital download

1. "Dance Dance Dance" – 3:23

== Credits and personnel ==
Credits adapted from the CD liner notes of the single.

Vocalists

- Shizuka – vocals, background vocals (All tracks)
- Aya – vocals, background vocals (Track 3)
- Ami – (Tracks 1 and 3)
- Erie Abe – (Tracks 2 and 3)
- Karen Fujii – (Track 1)
- Ruri Kawamoto – (Track 2)
- Reina Washio – vocals, background vocals (All tracks)

Performers

- Anna Ishii – performer
- Nonoka Yamaguchi – performer
- Sayaka – performer
- Kaede – performer
- Yurino – performer
- Anna Suda – performer
- Shuuka Fujii – performer
- Mio Nakajima – performer
- Nozomi Bando – performer
- Harumi Sato – performer

Music credits

- Lauren Kaori – songwriter, (Track 1) composer (Track 3)
- DWB – composer, producer (Track 1)
- Nanna Larsen – composer (Track 1)
- Honorable – songwriter (Track 2)
- T-SK – composer, producer (Track 2)
- Liv Nervo – composer (Track 2)
- Mim Nervo – (Track 2)
- Masoko Kotake – songwriter (Track 3)
- Masaki Iehara – composer (Track 3)
- Kohei Yokono – composer (Track 2)
- Exile Hiro – producer (All tracks)
- Kanji Suto – music video director

== Charts and sales ==
=== Japanese charts ===
| Chart (2015–2016) | Peak position |
|---|---|
| Japan Daily Chart (Oricon) | 2 |
| Japan Weekly Chart (Oricon) | 4 |
| Japan Hot 100 (Billboard) | 3 |
| Japan Radio Songs Chart (Billboard) | 5 |
| Japan Hot Singles Sales Chart (Billboard) | 11 |

=== Sales ===
| Region | Certification | Certified units/sales |
|---|---|---|
| Japan (RIAJ) | —N/a | 58,113 |

== Release history ==
| Region | Date | Format | Label | Ref. |
|---|---|---|---|---|
| Japan | September 30, 2015 | CD; DVD; one-coin CD | Rhythm Zone | |
| Japan | September 30, 2015 | Digital download | Avex Music Creative Inc. | |
| Australia | September 30, 2015 | Digital download | Avex Music Creative Inc. | |
| New Zealand | September 30, 2015 | Digital download | Avex Music Creative Inc. | |
| United Kingdom | September 30, 2015 | Digital download | Avex Music Creative Inc. | |
| Ireland | September 30, 2015 | Digital download | Avex Music Creative Inc. | |
| Germany | September 30, 2015 | Digital download | Avex Music Creative Inc. | |
| France | September 30, 2015 | Digital download | Avex Music Creative Inc. | |
| Spain | September 30, 2015 | Digital download | Avex Music Creative Inc. | |
| Taiwan | September 30, 2015 | Digital download | Avex Music Creative Inc. | |
| United States | September 30, 2015 | Digital download | Avex Music Creative Inc. | |
| Canada | September 30, 2015 | Digital download | Avex Music Creative Inc. | |
