= ShuuKaRen =

Japanese Dance-pop and EDM duo

- Also known as: Shuukaren; SKR
- Origin: Japan
- Genres: Dance-pop, EDM
- Years active: 2016-2018
- Labels: LDH, Sony Music Entertainment Japan
- Past members: Shuuka Fujii; Karen Fujii

ShuuKaRen was a Japanese Dance-pop and EDM duo formed and managed by LDH in 2016. They were a sub-unit of supergroup E-girls and signed to the record label Sony Music Japan. The duo was composed of sisters Shuuka and Karen Fujii (hence the sub-unit's name), making them the first joint unit of members from the groups Flower and Happiness. This was also the first time Shuuka provided vocals to a musical project besides being a performer.

== History ==
=== 2016: Group formation and debut ===
On August 11, 2016, during the last concert of E-girls' third tour E-girls Live Tour 2016 "E.G. Smile" at Saitama Super Arena, Shuuka and Karen announced the formation of their sub-unit "ShuuKaRen" during the encore. The sisters would promote with this sub-unit whilst carrying on activities with their corresponding groups E-girls, Flower (Shuuka) and Happiness (Karen). It was also revealed that both girls would be singing, making this the first time Shuuka would be providing vocals for an official project since her debut (as a performer) in 2011. Their debut single titled "Universe" was announced to be released on October 5, 2016. Though it was the sisters' first musical release, they worked together prior to the formation with a fashion book, titled Antithese, which garnered critical success and sold over 100,000 units in Japan.

On September 7, it was announced that the unit's second song "Take-A-Shot! feat. PKCZ®" was chosen as the opening theme song for B.League's 2016-17 season.

On September 9, "Universe" was released as a digital single prior to the physical release of their single album.

On September 22, their second digital single "Take-a-Shot!" featuring PKCZ® was released. It was later on included as a B-side alongside "Tricky" on their debut single. The duo also held their first performance of the song "Take-A-Shot! feat. PKCZ®" during the opening ceremony of the B.League on September 22.

On September 24, the duo starred in their first TV commercial for a new candy product from UHA called e-maのど飴 モーフィング together. Their song "Tricky" was chosen as the title song for the CM.

=== 2017-2018: Third digital single and Shuuka's retirement ===
On October 22, 2017, Shuuka announced the third digital single of the duo titled "Love Your Life / Parallel Synchronicity" while also announcing her temporary hiatus due to health problems. The single was released on November 10, 2017. "Love Your Life" was used as a TV commercial song for a Kose Fasio TV CM in which both Shuuka and Karen appeared. "Parallel Synchronization", produced by m-flo, was chosen as the theme song for the B.League Championship 2016-17.

On December 31, Shuuka announced to have graduated from the unit and retired from entertainment industry due to worsening symptoms of cervical spinal disc herniation. As result, the unit disbanded. On January 15, 2018, ShuuKaRen's website and social media accounts were closed, along with Shuuka's personal blog on E.G.family mobile.

== Members ==
| Name | Position | Date of birth | Other Groups |
|---|---|---|---|
| Shuuka Fujii | vocalist, performer | October 14, 1994 (age 25) | E-girls (formerly) Flower (formerly) |
| Karen Fujii | vocalist, performer | July 16, 1996 (age 23) | E-girls Happiness |

== Discography ==
=== Single ===
| Title | Details | Peak position | Sales | Certifications |
|---|---|---|---|---|
| Universe | Released: October 5, 2016; Label: Sony Music Japan; Formats: CD, CD/DVD, digital download | 4 | 59,980 | — |

=== Digital Singles ===
| Title | Details | Peak position | Sales | Certifications |
|---|---|---|---|---|
| Universe | Released: September 9, 2016 | — | — | — |
| Take-a-Shot! feat. PKCZ® | Released: September 22, 2016 | — | — | — |
| LOVE YOUR LIFE / Parallel Synchronicity | Released: November 10, 2017 | — | — | — |

== Tie-up ==
| Song | Tie-up | Tracklist |
|---|---|---|
| Universe | Beats by Dre "Show Your Color" CM | Single "Universe" |
| Take-a-Shot! feat. PKCZ® | B.LEAGUE 2016-17 SEASON opening theme song | Single "Universe" |
| LOVE YOUR LIFE | KOSÉ FASIO TV CM | |
| Parallel Synchronicity produced by M-Flo | B.LEAGUE CHAMPIONSHIP 2016-17 theme song | |
