= Your Lie in April (film) =

- Poster
- Kanji: 四月は君の嘘
- Directed by: Takehiko Shinjō
- Screenplay by: Yukari Tatsui
- Based on: Your Lie in April by Naoshi Arakawa
- Produced by: Takashi Ishihara; Kōhei Furukawa; Minami Ichikawa
- Starring: Kento Yamazaki; Suzu Hirose; Anna Ishii; Taishi Nakagawa; Yuka Itaya; Rei Dan
- Cinematography: Mitsuru Komiyama
- Edited by: Junnosuke Hogaki
- Music by: Ryō Yoshimata
- Production companies: C&I entertainment Fuji TV; Kodansha; Toho
- Distributed by: Toho
- Release date: September 10, 2016
- Running time: 122 minutes
- Country: Japan
- Language: Japanese
- Box office: ¥1.42 billion ($13.05 million)

Your Lie in April (Japanese: 四月は君の嘘, Hepburn: Shigatsu wa Kimi no Uso) is a 2016 Japanese youth music romance film directed by Takehiko Shinjō, written by Yukari Tatsui, starring Suzu Hirose and Kento Yamazaki and based on the manga series of the same name written and illustrated by Naoshi Arakawa. It was released in Japan by Toho on September 10, 2016.

== Plot ==
Kōsei Arima is a piano prodigy who has won many awards due to his precision, timing, and ability to switch between tempos easily, earning him the moniker "the human metronome". He achieved so much because he was meticulously taught by his terminally ill mother, Saki, who was abusive and demanding. When, as a seven-year-old, she slapped him after a victory that she deemed unwarranted, he declared his refusal to play the piano ever again and wished that she died. Indeed, Saki died the following day; this caused Kōsei to experience a mental breakdown during a recital, making him unable to hear sounds from the piano. Since then, Kōsei quit playing piano in public.

Ten years later, (Note: In the 48th minute of the film, Kaori says "we are still 17" referring to herself and Kōsei.) in April, Kōsei is invited by his childhood friends Tsubaki Sawabe and Ryōta Watari to go on a double date with them and Kaori Miyazono, whom Tsubaki says is attracted to Watari. Kaori, as it turns out, is a bubbly children-loving violinist. She plays the violin in an unorthodox manner, refusing to follow the cues and instead creating her own flow that nevertheless impresses the audience. One of her competitions requires a pianist to accompany her, so Kaori forces Kōsei to come out of retirement and accompany her. During the competition, Kōsei experiences a breakdown again, but Kaori encourages him to restart the recital, despite the fact that it will disqualify her. He succeeds and while Kaori is disqualified, the organizers invited her to play at a gala concert. For the gala, Kaori picks Love's Sorrow, a piece that Saki used to play as a lullaby for her son. Kōsei is initially hesitant, but his mother's pianist friend, Hiroko Seto, tells him that it would be a good chance to prove to his mother what a pianist he has become.

During the concert, Kaori is unexpectedly hospitalized, so Kōsei plays the piece as a piano solo. Kaori is later discharged and, as a punishment for not visiting her in the hospital, forces Kōsei to be Watari's "substitute" for a date the two had planned. The two visit the school that night, where Kaori reveals that she had lied about the date, as she is still hospitalized but does not want her illness to make her helpless. When she faints, Kōsei takes her to the hospital but otherwise is unable to say anything else. Watari correctly deduces that Kōsei is in love with Kaori and encourages him to meet and confess to her. Meanwhile, Tsubaki anguishedly declares her own love for Kōsei and reveals that she agreed to introduce Kaori because she hoped that would make Kōsei turn to her. Afterwards, Kōsei confesses to Kaori as the two share a meal on the hospital rooftop. He also tells her that he will join a piano competition for the first time in ten years. Hearing that he wishes to play music with her again, Kaori decides to undergo a risky surgery scheduled on the day of Kōsei's contest. During the competition, Kōsei is aided by an apparition of Kaori playing violin alongside him.

In spring of the following year, Kōsei opens a letter written by Kaori, who did not survive the surgery. He learns that Kaori had been admiring him since they were young children and had decided to study violin so she could someday play music with him. When she learned that her illness was terminal, she transformed her image and personality drastically so as to avoid having regrets. She also requests him to apologize to Tsubaki and Watari in her place. She told him that she had loved him all this time and not Watari, which was her lie in April.

== Cast ==
- Suzu Hirose as Kaori Miyazono
  - Maharu Nemoto as young Kaori
- Kento Yamazaki as Kōsei Arima
  - Oe Yuuri as young Kōsei
- Anna Ishii as Tsubaki Sawabe
- Taishi Nakagawa as Ryōta Watari
- Masahiro Kōmoto
- Hirotarō Honda
- Yuka Itaya as Hiroko Seto
- Rei Dan as Saki Arima

== Production ==
The theme song of the film is "Last Scene" by Ikimono-gakari, with "君なんだよ" by wacci playing during Kaori and Kōsei's date. On January 29, 2016, it was announced that Your Lie in April will getting a live-action film which was released on September 10, 2016.

== Box office ==
The film was third placed on its opening weekend, with ¥244.6 million in gross and 200,036 admissions. By the end of 2016, the film had grossed ¥1.42 billion ($13.05 million) in Japan.
