= Juicy Love (Happiness song) =

- CD and DVD, and digital artwork that commercializes "Juicy Love"

Single by Happiness

from the album Girlz n' Effect
- B-side: "Show Me Your Heart"; "Happy Talk (2014 version)"
- Released: May 28, 2014
- Recorded: 2014; Avex Trax Studios (Minato-ku, Tokyo, Japan)
- Genre: Dance-pop
- Length: 3:48
- Label: Rhythm Zone; Avex Music Creative Inc.
- Songwriter: Kanata Okajima
- Producer: Exile Hiro

Happiness singles chronology
"Sunshine Dream (Ichido Kiri no Natsu)" (2013)	"Juicy Love" (2014)	"Seek a Light" (2014)

"Juicy Love" (stylized as "JUICY LOVE in digital formats) is a song recorded by Japanese girl group Happiness, taken as the lead single from their second studio album, Girlz n' Effect (2016). It was released on May 28, 2014 via Rhythm Zone and Avex Music Creative Inc., and distributed in four physical formats—two standard compact discs, music cards and a CD and DVD bundle—and for digital consumption. The track was written and co-composed by Kanata Okajima, with additional music and production credits to Albi Albertsson and Patrick Hamilton; co-production was handled by Exile's Hiro.

Musically, it is a dance-pop song that incorporates synthesizers and keyboards within its instrumentation. Although members Karen Fujii and Ruri Kawamoto provide vocals throughout the composition, the remaining five girls sing background vocals through the song's chorus. Lyrically, the song focuses of themes of enjoyment and love. Upon its release, "Juicy Love" received favorable reviews from music critics, with compliments aimed towards its dance nature and noted the creative progression since member Miyuu took over leadership of the group.

Commercially, "Juicy Love" experienced moderate success in Japan, reaching the top 10 on both the Oricon Singles Chart and Japan Hot 100. By June 2014, the single sold over 30,000 units as reported by Oricon. An accompanying music video was published on the Avex Trax YouTube channel, depicting them in three rooms that focus on different fashion styles. In order to promote the track, Happiness performed "Juicy Love" on several television and live shows, and was subsequently used as the ending theme song to Nippon TV's Pon (2014).

== Background and composition ==
In August 2012, the group's main vocalist, Mayu Sugieda, was diagnosed with mononucleosis and postponed promotional activities to receive treatment. This led to several changes to the line-up of Happiness were made; in May 2013, performer Anna Suda and vocalist Ruri Kawamoto were added to the girl group. Whilst Sugieda was on hiatus, the group's management, LDH, decided to move forward and announce the release of Happiness' single "Sunshine Dream (Ichido Kiri no Natsu)", which was distributed by Rhythm Zone and Avex Music Creative Inc. in August that year. The following month, Sugieda returned and went under the stage name Mayu; however, on April 7, 2014, she announced her departure from both the group and E-girls. LDH announced plans to release a new single in May of that year, titled "Juicy Love"; this would place members Karen Fujii and Kawamoto as the group's main vocalists, and their first single since Sugeida's exit.

The track was written and co-composed by Kanata Okajima, with additional music and production credits to Albi Albertsson and Patrick Hamilton. Furthermore, co-production was handled by Exile's Hiro. Although Fujii and Kawamoto provide vocals throughout the composition, the remaining five girls sing background vocals through the song's chorus. It was recorded in 2014 by Hideaki Jimbu at Avex Studios, Minato-ku, Tokyo, Japan. Musically, "Juicy Love" is a dance-pop song that incorporates synthesizers and keyboards within its instrumentation. According to the group's management, they prompt it to be a "refreshing summer tune", whilst Avex Trax dubbed it a "pop tune" that infuses both "cute" and "love" lyrics with a sharp sound. Additionally, Fujii commented: "It's a pop song about the cute feelings of a girl in love."

== Release and b-sides ==
"Juicy Love" was released on May 28, 2014, via Rhythm Zone and Avex Music Creative Inc., and distributed in four physical formats—two standard compact discs, music cards and a CD and DVD bundle—and for digital consumption. The CD, and additional DVD bundle came with the single, alongside two B-side tracks: "Show Me Your Heart" and a 2014 recording of their previous release "Happy Talk"; the DVD also comes with the corresponding music video. Both formats also consisted the instrumental versions. A limited compact disc, titled the "One Coin" edition, and eight individual music cards—each featuring a member of Happiness, and one group card—only included "Juicy Love". Upon its release, "Juicy Love" received favorable reviews from music critics; a member at CD Journal complimented its "sweet" sound, whilst KKBox labelled it a "hot" featured track. Critics also noted the creative progression since member Miyuu took over leadership of the group.

"Show Me Your Heart" was written by Takaki Mizoguchi, with additional music credits to Matthew Tishler and Andrew Underberg. Produced by Hiro, the recording was noted as a "pounding dance floor" anthem that was appreciated by critics for its ability to "demand immediate attention". Additionally, "Happy Talk" was originally recorded by Karen Fujii in 2009; it was re-recorded with Fujii and Kawamoto's vocals. Furthermore, "Juicy Love" and "Show Me Your Heart" were added to the group's second studio album, Girlz n' Effect (2016).

== Commercial performance ==
Commercially, "Juicy Love" experienced moderate success in Japan. It debuted at number four, its peak position, on the daily Oricon Singles Chart. Based on a six-day statistic, the single entered the weekly chart at number seven, making it the sixth highest debuting entry that week—dated June 9, 2014— and sold 26,969 copies. That same week, Oricon ranked the song at number 15. The following week saw a slump in sales, slipping to number 38 and sold an additional 1,878 units; this was the single's final appearance inside the top 40. In total, "Juicy Love" spent five weeks inside the top 200 chart and sold over 30,011 copies by the end of its chart run. As of November 2016, Oricon has recognized the recording as the group's third highest-selling single.

"Juicy Love" proved to be moderately successful on component charts, as hosted by Billboard. It opened at number 53 on the Japan Hot 100, but struggled to pass the top 50 within its first few weeks of charting. However, on June 9, the single entered the top ten at number nine, one of the highest gainers that week. The song's final appearance was dated on June 23, slipping to number 48. Moreover, "Juicy Love" debuted at numbers 31 and 17 on the Radio Songs and Top Singles Sales chart, the highest for the latter chart; it peaked at number 4 on the former.

== Music video and promotion ==
An accompanying music video was directed and included on the DVD version of the single; furthermore, a short version was published on May 6, 2014, via the Avex Trax YouTube channel. It opens with member Karen Fujii standing next to a Happiness sign on the wall, but starts to walk towards the camera and introduce the remaining members. The room that the girls are dancing in is full with square-shaped patterns and illustrations, with additional mirrors next to them. By the chorus section, there are three rooms with similar interior; all encased with mirrors and small architectures, whilst each scene has the members in different clothing. The second chorus has them wearing small dresses, dancing in front of large playing cards. Before the final bridge and chorus section, each performing member—cancelling out vocalists Fujii and Ruri Kawamoto—perform a solo dance segment, similar to the visuals made with E-girls. The video ends the girls dancing in each room again until the music ends. The video was complimented by an editor at MTV 81, who said: "The near-infinite outfit changes throughout this video packed with sexy dance moves will keep your eyeballs stuck on your screen."

In order to promote the single, Happiness travelled throughout Japan to host live shows and other interactive events. Between April 29–May 4, the group visited Tokyo, Gunma, Shizuoka, Osaka and Saitama to perform the track. Two events in Tokyo and Kanagawa Prefecture were held on May 5 and 10, respectively; the latter was assigned as a meet and greet event. Additionally, a special event in Osaka was hosted by radio stations in that region; Happiness appeared as a special guest to sing "Juicy Love". A meet and greet was then held in Fukuoka Prefecture on May 8. "Juicy Love" was used as the ending theme song to Nippon TV's Pon (2014).

== Track listing and formats ==
CD single

1. "Juicy Love" – 3:48
2. "Show Me Your Heart" – 3:28
3. "Happy Talk" (2014 version) – 3:38
4. "Juicy Love" (Instrumental) – 3:46
5. "Show Me Your Heart" (Instrumental) – 3:28
6. "Happy Talk" (2014 version) [Instrumental] – 3:36

DVD single

1. "Juicy Love" – 3:48
2. "Show Me Your Heart" – 3:28
3. "Happy Talk" (2014 version) – 3:38
4. "Juicy Love" (Instrumental) – 3:46
5. "Show Me Your Heart" (Instrumental) – 3:28
6. "Happy Talk" (2014 version) [Instrumental] – 3:36
  1. "Juicy Love" (music video) – 3:55

One Coin CD / Music cards

1. "Juicy Love" – 3:48

Digital download

1. "Juicy Love" – 3:48
2. "Show Me Your Heart" – 3:28
3. "Happy Talk" (2014 version) – 3:38

== Credits and personnel ==
Credits adapted from the CD liner notes of the single.

Recording and mixing

- Track 1 recorded by Hideaki Jinbu at Avex Studios, Minato-ku, Tokyo, Japan. Track 2 recorded by Makoto Yamadoi at Avex Studios, Minato-ku, Tokyo, Japan. Track 3 recorded by Kentaro Nakano at Prime Sound Studio Form, Tokyo, Japan. All tracks mixed by Satoshi Kumasaka at Prime Sound Studio Form, Tokyo, Japan.

Members

- Sayaka – performer, background vocals (track 1: chorus only)
- Kaede – performer, background vocals (track 1: chorus only)
- Karen Fujii – vocals, background vocals, performer
- Miyuu – performer, group leader, background vocals (track 1: chorus only)
- Yurino – performer, background vocals (track 1: chorus only)
- Anna Suda – performer, background vocals (track 1: chorus only)
- Ruri Kawamoto – vocals, background vocals, performer

Music credits

- Kanata Okajima – songwriting, composing
- Albi Albertsson – composing
- Patrick Hamilton – composing
- Tohru Watanabe – arranging
- MUSSASHI – arranging
- Exile Hiro – producer
- Takaki Mizoguchi – songwriting
- Matthew Tishler – composing, producer
- Andrew Underberg – composing, producer
- Jetpack Sally – producer
- Kaori Yajima – songwriting
- Yusuke Itagaki – composing
- Yuta Nakano – arranging
- Kazuki Kumagai – sound director
- Shigeo Miyamoto – mastering
- Motoko Mizoguchi – art direction
- Mayumi Koshiishi – photography
- Nihei – styling
- Tomoyuki Onishi – hair and make-up
- Saeko Azuma – hair and make-up
- Koichi Inoue – visual producer

== Charts ==
=== Oricon charts ===
Chart (2014)	Peak position
Japan Daily Chart (Oricon)	4
Japan Weekly Chart (Oricon)	7
Japan Monthly Chart (Oricon)	15

=== Billboard charts ===
Chart (2014)	Peak position
Japan Hot 100 (Billboard)	9

== Sales ==
Region	Certification	Certified units/sales
Japan	—	30,011

== Release history ==
Region	Date	Format	Label
Japan	May 28, 2014	CD; DVD; music cards; digital download	Rhythm Zone
Australia	May 28, 2014	Digital download	Avex Music Creative Inc.
New Zealand	May 28, 2014	Digital download	Avex Music Creative Inc.
United Kingdom	May 28, 2014	Digital download	Avex Music Creative Inc.
Germany	May 28, 2014	Digital download	Avex Music Creative Inc.
Ireland	May 28, 2014	Digital download	Avex Music Creative Inc.
France	May 28, 2014	Digital download	Avex Music Creative Inc.
Spain	May 28, 2014	Digital download	Avex Music Creative Inc.
Taiwan	May 28, 2014	Digital download	Avex Music Creative Inc.
