= Anna Suda =

Japanese performer, actress, and rapper (born 1997)

- 須田 アンナ
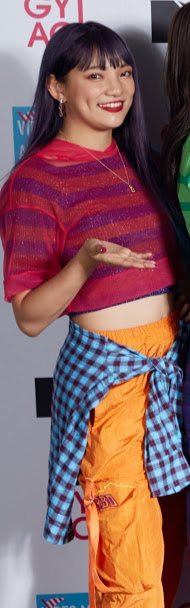
- Suda in 2018
- Born: October 12, 1997 (age 28); Sumida, Tokyo, Japan
- Other name: Sudanna
- Occupations: Dancer; actress; fashion designer
- Years active: 2011–present
- Spouse: Unknown (m. 2023)
- Children: 1
- Musical career
- Genres: J-pop; dance
- Labels: Universal Music Japan (2013); Rhythm Zone (2014–present)
- Formerly of: Happiness; E-girls; SudannaYuzuYully

YouTube information
- Channel: ANNABABY LIFE
- Years active: 2022–present
- Genre: Vlog
- Subscribers: 48.5 thousand
- Views: 8 million
- Last updated: November 17, 2025

Anna Suda (須田 アンナ, Suda Anna; born October 12, 1997), better known by her nickname Sudanna, is a Japanese dancer, actress and fashion designer. She is a former member of the J-Pop groups E-girls, Happiness and SudannaYuzuYully.

As an actress, she appeared in several dramas such as the Tokai TV/Fuji TV series Asu no Hikari o Tsukame: 2013 Summer in 2013.

== Early life ==
Anna Suda was born on October 12, 1997, in Tokyo, Japan, to a Filipina mother and a Japanese father. She has one older brother and two younger sisters. She began practicing dancing at the age of 9 and started to attend the EXPG dance school in Tokyo in her first year of junior high school. The biggest musical influences during her childhood were Western music, J-Pop and K-Pop.

She speaks Japanese as well as Tagalog.

== Career ==
In 2011, she participated in the dance section of the VOCAL BATTLE AUDITION 3. Even though she was defeated during the training camp examination, she was able to become part of EGD (EXPG GIRLS DANCERS) from EXPG.

On March 8, 2012, it was announced that she would join E-girls as a new member alongside Kizu Reina, who was also part of EGD.

In January 2013. she made her acting debut on the drama Shinryo-chu -in the Room-. Sudanna played her first lead role in the TV series Ashita no Hikari wo Tsukame -2013 Summer- in the same year. On May 27, it was announced she would join Happiness as a new member and performer.

In 2017, Sudanna appeared on the cover of Nylon Japan's December issue, her first solo magazine cover in her career as a model.

On November 9, 2016, she was announced as a member and rapper of the E-girls sub-unit Sudannayuzuyully, marking the first time she would be using her vocals in a group.

On September 21, 2018, Sudanna announced she would collaborate with the Japanese fashion brand EVRIS on a clothing collection. The collaboration titled -SUDA ANNA×EVRIS- "SPECIAL COLLABORATION" was released on October 26 and included several pieces designed by herself. In November 2018, she was chosen as one of the ambassadors for LDH Martial Arts' "ENERGY PROJECT" which advertises different fitness supplies from LDH's original brand. In the same month, it was announced she would co-star in the GYAO! web-drama Hapigora! (Happy-Go-Lucky!) alongside her label mates Alan Shirahama and Mandy Sekiguchi, both members of Generations from Exile Tribe.

On September 17, 2019, she announced her second collaboration with EVRIS titled SUDA ANNA×EVRIS Vol.2- "SPECIAL COLLABORATION". The collaboration was intended to commemorate the brand's 6th anniversary, included several products which were designed by Sudanna herself and was released on October 10.

== Personal life ==
Sudanna is known for her flashy hair colors. In an interview with the online magazine FNMNL she mentioned that after debuting with E-girls and entering the entertainment industry as a teenager, she felt pressured to conform to feminine standards and "look as neat as an actress". However, this made her feel uncomfortable since she had always preferred individuality. In order to break through her shell she started wearing street wear and dyeing her hair in flashy colors. At that time, people around her didn't accept this style, saying she shouldn't have that kind of hair color or that she should "dress more like a girl". Despite the opposition, Sudanna did not quit. For this reason, she also wants to encourage young girls to pursue self-expression and not to feel shy about it.

=== Marriage ===
On March 22, 2023, Sudanna registered her marriage with her non-celebrity partner after dating for over two years. She revealed that they had met at a party and soon became friends, and the relationship later developed into romance. The couple held their wedding ceremony on May 5, 2024. Later, in September, she moved her entertainment activities to Saga Prefecture due to her husband's work.

In October 2024, she announced through her official social media account that she was expecting their first child. She later gave birth to a son on March 29, 2025.

== Filmography ==
=== Dramas ===
Year	Title	Role	Network	Notes	Ref(s)
2013	Shinryo-chu -in the Room-	Minami Kaihara / Miu	Nippon TV		
2013	Ashita no Hikari wo Tsukame -2013 Natsu-	Aoi Ota	Tokai TV/Fuji TV	Lead role	
2014	Koibumi Biyori (A Perfect Day for Love Letters)	Natsume Shinohara	Nippon TV	Episode 6; Lead role	
2018	Hapigora! (Happy-Go-Lucky!)	Mae	GYAO!	web-drama; Lead role	

=== TV shows ===
Year	Title	Network	Ref(s)
2018–present	Gachamuku	BS Fuji	

=== Commercials ===
Year	Title	Notes	Ref(s)
2019	Yofuku no Aoyama	with other E-girls members	

=== Music videos ===
Year	Title	Artist	Album
2018	Double Play	CrazyBoy	NEOTOKYO FOREVER

=== Runways ===
Year	Title	Season	Ref(s)
2012	Girls Award	Autumn/Winter	
2014	Tokyo Runway	Spring/Summer	
2017	Girls Award	Autumn/Winter	
2018	Girls Award	Autumn/Winter	

== Bibliography ==
=== Catalogues ===
Year	Title	Ref(s)
2019	The New Era®︎Book/Spring & Summer 2019	
2019	X-girl 2019 SPRING/SUMMER SPECIAL BOOK	

=== Magazines ===
Year	Title	Notes	Ref(s)
2017	Nylon Japan	December issue, cover	
2017–present	mini	regular model	
2017–present	smart	regular model	
