= Dream Ami =

Japanese singer, dancer, and television personality (born 1988)

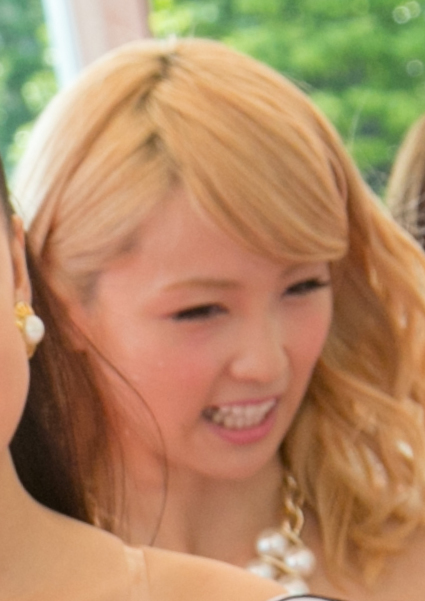
- Born: Ami Nakashima (中島麻未); May 11, 1988 (age 38); Minoh, Osaka, Japan
- Other name: Ami
- Occupations: Singer; dancer; television personality
- Agents: Avex Management (2002–06); LDH (2008–)
- Spouse: Yuto Handa (m. 2020)
- Musical career
- Genres: Pop; J-pop
- Instruments: Vocals; guitar
- Years active: 2002–present
- Labels: Avex Trax; Rhythm Zone
- Formerly of: Dream; E-girls
- Website: ami-ldh.jp

Ami Nakashima (中島 麻未, Nakashima Ami; born May 11, 1988), known as Ami or Dream Ami, is a Japanese singer, dancer and television personality. She is a former member of the Japanese girl groups Dream and E-girls.

She debuted as a member of the eight-member group Dream in 2002 at the age of 14, and she had remained throughout several line-up changes until the group stopped their activities. She gained fame after becoming part of the collective girl group E-girls in 2011. In 2015, she debuted as a solo artist with the single "Dress o Nuida Cinderella". Apart from music activities, she is widely known for her regular appearances on Japanese television and various media, and was ranked as one of the most popular Japanese female idols by Nikkei in 2016 and 2017.

== Early life ==
Ami was born in Minoh, Osaka Prefecture on May 11, 1988, as the youngest child of her family. She has an older brother and an older sister. She harbored a passion for singing from a young age. During her third year in elementary school, Ami enrolled in Minoh's boys and girls choir where she was an alto singer. She became interested in pursuing a career in the entertainment industry after performing in recitals, with the aspiration of getting more people to look at her. Prior to debuting, she attended the vocal and dance school, CALESS, in Osaka.

== Career ==
=== 2002–14: Dream and E-girls ===
On July 7, 2002, she was announced to be joining the group Dream as a new member alongside five other girls, after successfully passing the audition held by Avex. The new line-up later debuted with the single "Music Is My Thing", used as the ending song for the anime Hikaru no Go in 2003. In 2005, she became a part of the temporary subgroup a☆girls with Aiko Kayo within Girl's Box – a collaborative unit made up of female singers affiliated to Avex. The duo recorded and performed a cover of the 1980s duo Wink. Later in 2008, Dream, at that time rebranded as DRM, changed management to LDH. They also changed their group name back to Dream and Ami started to use her given name romanized as stage name.

In April 2011, she began her activities as a part of LDH's new collective unit, E-girls, with the members of Dream, Happiness and Flower during the live events E-Girls Show. On December 28, 2011, she debuted officially as a member of the group on their debut single "Celebration!", holding a concurrent position as a member of both E-girls and Dream. Initially featured only as a performer, Ami made her first appearance as a vocalist in E-girls' line-up on their third single and breakthrough song "Follow Me" in 2012. Since then, she had remained one of the main vocalists and the most prominent member of the group until her departure from the group.

In January 2014, she was announced to be the new leader of Dream. Later that year, she also took part in Dance Earth Project's stage play Changes, and participated in the single "Peace Sunshine" as a member of Dance Earth Party alongside other Dream members.

=== 2015–17: Solo debut and Re: Dream ===
On April 29, 2015, during E-girls' concert at Saitama Super Arena, it was announced that Ami would make her solo debut in the summer as Dream Ami, while remaining active in both of her groups. Her debut single, "Dress o Nuida Cinderella", was released on July 29 and peaked at number five on the Oricon Singles Chart. The following month, she was featured on Tofubeats' single "Positive". The song was released digitally on August 9, and served as the lead single for the studio album of the same name.

On February 24, 2016, it was announced that she would sing the theme song for the Japanese version of the Disney film Zootopia, and provide the voice for one of the characters. The song titled "Try Everything" is the Japanese version of the song of the same title by Shakira and was released in two different versions in April. It reached number eight on Billboard Japan's Hot Animation of the Year 2016. On October 19, 2016, she released her 3rd single, a Japanese cover of the Cardigans' Lovefool. It was the first single to include a song for which she had been credited as lyricist.

Ami released her 4th single, "Hayaku Aitai", on March 22, 2017. She wrote the lyrics for the title track, used as the theme song for the live-action movie Daytime Shooting Star. The song ranked as one of the most listened songs among teenage girls on Line Music in 2017, and the lyrics were cited as one of the reasons for its popularity. On June 5, 2017, it was announced that she would focus on her solo activities as one of the acts making up the E.G.family. The two-day concert "E.G. Evolution" held on July 15 and 16 at Saitama Super Arena were her last activities as a member of both groups. She announced on her birthday that she would be releasing her 5th single "Kimi no Tonari" on July 12, 2017.

Her first studio album, Re: Dream, was released on October 4, 2017. In support of the album, she embarked on her first solo concert tour named Dream Ami 1st Live Tour 2017 Re: Dream. The live house tour consisted of five shows and visited five cities in Japan throughout the month of November.

=== 2018–present: Singles and E.G.POWER to the DOME ===
On April 18, 2018, she released her 6th single "Amaharu". The single includes footage of her first tour held on November 21 in Tokyo. On July 21, she made her first solo appearance at Tokyo Girls Collection after graduating from E-girls. On September 7 of the same year, she released the digital single "NEXT". The song was used as ending song for the Netflix animation movie Next Gen. On October 24, Ami released her 7th single "Wonderland". The song was used as theme song for the movie Ozland Egao no Mahou Oshiemasu.

From February 22 to May 25, 2019, she participated in E.G.family's first tour E.G.POWER 2019 ~POWER to the DOME~. On March 13, she released her 8th single "Good Goodbye". The song was pre-released on January 30 and used as the theme song for the movie えいがのおそ松さん Eiga Osomatsu-San (Mr. Osomatsu the Movie). On August 6, it was announced that Ami will cover Koda Kumi's song "Koi no Tsubomi" for the drama Busu no Hitomi ni Koishiteru 2019, which stars E-girls/Flower member Harumi Sato and Exile/Sandaime J Soul Brothers member Naoto. The song was released as a digital single on September 17.

On February 17, 2020, it was announced that Ami will carry the Olympic torch as one of 10 LDH members in the torch relay in Tokyo on July 17. Furthermore, she released her first style book titled Amithing on March 5.

== Personal life ==
Ami's trademark is her blond hair. When Dream transferred to LDH in 2008 she decided to change her image by dyeing her hair.

On February 22, 2020, Ami announced her marriage to Yuto Handa, architect and former member of popular reality TV show "Terrace House". The couple started dating in 2017 after getting introduced to each other by a mutual acquaintance.

== Discography ==
- Re: Dream (2017)

== Tours ==
- Dream Ami 1st Live Tour 2017 Re: Dream (2017)

== Filmography ==
=== Films ===
Title	Year	Role	Notes	Ref.
Zootopia	2016	Gazelle	Japanese dub	
Under the Black Dress	2017	Yui Nakame	Short film	

=== Television ===
Title	Year	Role	Network	Notes	Ref.
Shūkan Exile	2012–14	Host	TBS		
Monsieur!	2013	Ami	CBC	Episode 10	
High Noon TV Viking!	2014–16	Regular cast	Fuji TV	Thursday appearances	
BF Kaigi	2014–15	Host	TV Asahi		
Chibi Maruko-chan	2015	Herself (voice)	Fuji TV	Television special	
Good Time Music	2016–17	Host	TBS		
Rikukaiku Konna Jikan ni Chikyu Seifuku Suru Nante	2017–19	Regular cast	TV Asahi	Biweekly appearances	
Secret x Warrior Phantom Mirage!	2020–	Phantom Queen Amigo	TV Tokyo		

=== Radio ===
Title	Year	Role	Network	Ref.
Beautiful Harmony	2013–17	DJ/Co-host	FM802	
Dream Ami's Happy-Go-Lucky☆	2018–	Host	JFN	

=== Web shows ===
Title	Year	Role	Network	Ref.
Dam Channel	2013	Host	Club Dam	
Dam Channel TV	2017–18	Host	Club Dam	
Manatsu no Ookami-kun ni wa Damasarenai	2017	Regular cast	AbemaTV	
Mafuyu no Ookami-kun ni wa Damasarenai	2018	Regular cast	AbemaTV	
Taiyou to Ookami-kun ni wa Damasarenai	2018	Regular cast	AbemaTV	
Shirayuki to Ookami-kun ni wa Damasarenai	2019	Regular cast	AbemaTV	
Ookami-kun ni wa Damasarenai	2019	Regular cast	AbemaTV	
Tsuki to Ookami-kun ni wa Damasarenai	2020	Regular cast	AbemaTV	

=== Runways ===
Year	Title	Season	Ref.
2012	Girls Award	Autumn/Winter	
2013	Kansai Collection	Spring/Summer	
2014	Tokyo Runway	Spring/Summer	
2018	Girls Award	Spring/Summer	
2019	Girls Award	Autumn/Winter	

=== Commercials ===
Year	Title	Ref.
2015	Bandai Karaoke Ranking Party	
2016 –	Bourbon Delicious Coconut Milk	
2016–2017	Kenei Pharmaceutical Hand Pica Gel	

=== Advertisements ===
Year	Title	Ref.
2018	BRITA Japan fill&go Active	
2018	Rejob Rejob	
2018	Unilever LUX Shine Plus	
2018	Google Japan Google Apps Discover (Find) and Shop Search by Photo	
2019 –	Kao Merit PYUAN	

=== Music videos ===
Year	Title	Artist	Ref.
2017	BLACK BEANZ	Exile Takahiro	

== Other work ==
- Sanrio Dream Ami × Little Twin Stars (2019)
- Sanrio Puroland PURO WHITE CHRISTMAS – Ambassador (2019)

=== Style book ===
Year	Title	Ref.
2020	Amithing	
