= Shuuka Fujii =

Japanese actress (born 1994)

- 藤井 萩花
- Born: 14 October 1994 (age 32); Osaka Prefecture, Japan
- Other names: Shuuka (萩花, Shūka); Yoshiusagi (美兎; former stage name); Yoshiu (美卯; former stage name)
- Occupations: Dancer; model; actress; singer
- Years active: 2008–2017, 2026–present
- Agents: Papado; LDH; Hattori Pro.
- Height: 1.67 m (5 ft 6 in) (2013)
- Spouse: Leo Imamura (m. 2021; div. 2025)
- Children: 2
- Relatives: Ryusei Fujii (older brother); Karen Fujii (younger sister)
- Musical career
- Genre: J-pop
- Label: Rhythm Zone
- Formerly of: E-girls; Flower; ShuuKaRen

Shuuka Fujii (藤井 萩花, Fujii Shūka; born 14 October 1994) is a Japanese dancer, fashion model, actress, and singer. (Note: ShuuKaRen only.) She performed as a member of the music groups E-girls, Flower, and ShuuKaRen, and was a former exclusive model for JJ and Love Berry.

Fujii announced her retirement from the music industry on December 31, 2017 due to her injuries caused by a cervical herniated disk worsening. Upon her retirement, she announced she would be studying fashion, art, and photography. She resumed her entertainment activities on May 30, 2026.

== Personal life ==
Shuuka is the younger sister of Johnny's West member Ryusei Fujii and the older sister of E-girls, Happiness and ShuuKaRen member Karen Fujii.

On January 27, 2021, Shuuka announced on her Instagram that she had registered her marriage to ALI's vocalist Leo Imamura. The wedding was attended by the couple's family and close friends. A year later on April 26, Shuuka and her husband welcomed the birth of their twin sons. On October 1, 2025, Shuuka announced that she had divorced Imamura in early June.

== Filmography ==
=== TV series ===
Year	Title	Role	Network	Notes
2011	Don Quixote	Schoolgirl	NTV	Episode 2
2012	Sprout	Fumiko Hasumi	NTV	
2012	The Quiz	Sakura Kidera	NTV	
2014	A Perfect Day for Love Letters	Senyuki Matsushita	NTV	Episode 1
2015	High & Low: The Story of S.W.O.R.D.	Naomi	NTV	

=== Films ===
Year	Title	Role
2016	Road to High & Low	Naomi
2016	High & Low: The Movie	Naomi
2016	High & Low: Red Rain	Naomi

=== Runways ===
Year	Title
2011	Tokyo Girls Collection
2012	Tokyo Girls Collection in Nagoya
2013	Kansai Collection
2014	Kobe Collection
2014	Tokyo Runway
2015	Girls Award
2017	Tokyo Girls Collection Kitakyushu 2017

=== Advertisements ===
Year	Title	Ref.
2019	CASIO Japan BABY-G "G-MS"	

== Bibliography ==
=== Photo books ===
Year	Title	Ref.
2016	Antithese	
2017	Shuuka (萩花)	
2019	Gekkan Shuuka Shashin Nikaido Fumi (月刊萩花 写真 二階堂ふみ)	

=== Magazines ===
Year	Title	Notes
2007	Love Berry	Exclusive model
2013	JJ	Exclusive model
