= Anna Ishii =

Japanese dancer, actress and model (born 1998)

- 石井 杏奈
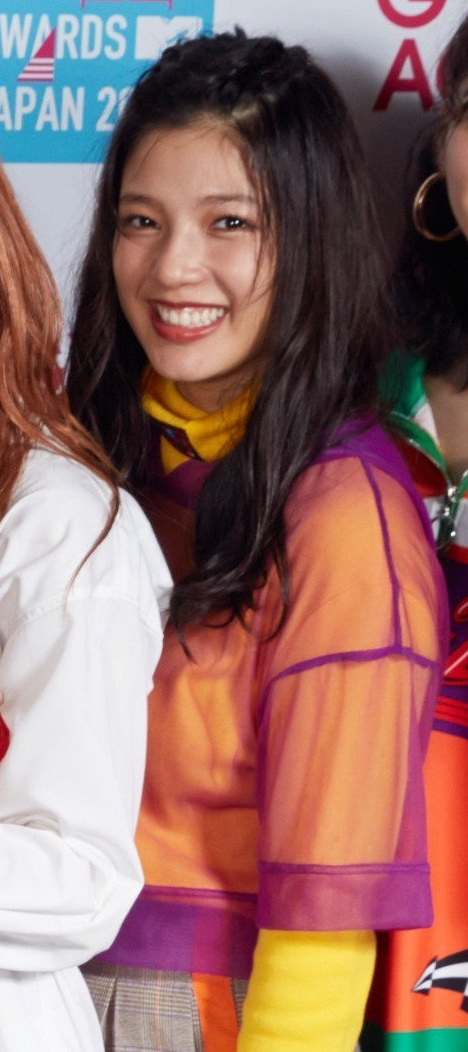
- Ishii at the VMAJ's with E-girls in October 2018
- Born: 11 July 1998 (age 27); Tokyo, Japan
- Occupations: Dancer; actress
- Years active: 2010–present
- Agent: LDH
- Known for: Solomon's Perjury; Girls Step; Your Lie In April

Anna Ishii (石井 杏奈, Ishii Anna; born July 11, 1998) is a Japanese dancer, actress and model. She is a former member of E-girls and represented by LDH.

== Early life ==
Ishii was born on July 11, 1998, in Tokyo, Japan. She has an elder brother, a younger brother, and a younger sister named Chino Ishii, who is currently listed under Kizzy, an all-female dance group composed of EXPG students. Ishii started dancing when she was in her second year of primary school at her mother's encouragement. She was later scouted to join the Exile Professional Gym (EXPG) in her fifth grade when she took part in a dance competition. She debuted as a model in the U-15 fashion magazine nico☆puchi in 2010 before joining E-girls.

== Career ==
=== Music career ===
In 2011, she was chosen through a nationwide audition process called "EXILE Presents VOCAL BATTLE AUDITION 3 ~For Girls~" in the dance performance category to be a member of a yet-to-debut dance and vocal group, bunny.

In October 2012, she officially joined E-girls line-up for their third single "Follow me".

In June 2014, due to scheduling conflicts with filming for Solomon's Perjury, Ishii announced that she would not participate in E-girls' first national tour, which was held between July and August that year.

On December 22, 2019, with the announcement of E-girls' disbandment set for around the end of 2020, it was revealed that Ishii would focus on acting and modeling activities afterwards.

=== Acting career ===
Ishii's acting debut was a cameo appearance in the first episode of Shiritsu Bakaleya Koukou, a Nippon TV drama which premiered in April 2012.

In 2014, she portrayed a blind piano prodigy in Koibumi Biyori, a drama starring 10 members of E-girls and a live-action adaptation of a manga of the same name authored by George Asakura. She then auditioned for a role in Solomon's Perjury, a 2015 film directed by Izuru Narushima. The audition was held nationwide and attracted approximately 10,000 aspiring young actors and actresses. Ishii was chosen to play the role of Miyake Juri, a vengeful and low self-esteemed girl who was bullied by a group of school delinquents for having bad skin.

Ishii landed her first starring role in a film, Girls Step which hit theaters in September 2015. This marked the first time that a member of E-girls had a lead role in a film. For her roles in Girls Step and Solomon's Perjury, Ishii won the 58th Blue Ribbon Best Newcomer Award. In 2016, her portrayal of Nagisa Arima, the passionate and earnest leader of the brass band club in Aogeba Tōtoshi, earned her the 5th Confidence Drama Best Newcomer Award. She also appeared in a live-action adaptation of Your lie in April where she played the role of Tsubaki Sawabe. The film was released on September 10, 2016.

In 2017, Ishii took on the role of Ayami Gotō, a problematic 17-year-old youth with family problems in an NHK drama, Okāsan, Musume wo Yamete ii desu ka?. Her next project was a four-episode NHK BS Premium mini drama starring Kenta Suga, Uso nante Hitotsu mo nai no. Kyota Fujimoto and Kentaro Hagiwara, who had previously teamed up for Shiseido's Maquillage face powder commercial short movie "Snow Beauty" starring Fumi Nikaido and Gen Hoshino, were respectively in charge of the screenplay and the direction of the drama. She also starred alongside Takayuki Yamada in a short film directed by Naomi Kawase, Parallel World, which premiered at the Short Shorts Film Festival & ASIA on June 1, and took on the role of Natsuki Nitō in a live-action adaptation of The Anthem of the Heart, which hit theaters on July 22.

In 2020 Ishii was announced to take part in her first stage play, the reading drama BOOK ACT "Entertainer Exchange Diary (Geinin koukan nikki)" alongside fellow LDH artists. She will also star in the film The Ashes of My Flesh and Blood is the Vast Flowing Galaxy (Kudake Chiru Tokoro wo Miseteageru) as Hari Kuramoto, a bullied first-grade high school student, alongside Taishi Nakagawa. The film was directed by Sabu and will be released on May 8, 2020. Furthermore, she will play the role of Satomi Sekiguchi in the remake of the popular 90s drama Tokyo Love Story which will be released in spring.

=== Endorsements ===
Ishii has appeared in a number of commercials, the most notable ones being her appearance as a countryside girl alongside Nana Komatsu in NTT DoCoMo d-Video CM directed by Tetsuya Nakashima, and in Japan Post CM with Masataka Kubota and Yoshiyoshi Arakawa.

== Filmography ==
=== TV series ===
Year	Title	Role	Notes	Ref.
2015	Live! Love! Sing! Ikite Itoshite Utau Koto	Asami Mizushima	Lead role	
2016	Brass Dreams	Nagisa Arima		
2017	Mom, May I Quit Being Your Daughter?	Ayami Goto		
2017	Uso nante Hitotsu mo nai no	Makoto Yamazaki		
2017	True Horror Stories: Summer 2017	Ayami	Short drama	
2018	We Are Rockets!	Shiori Kiryū		
2020	Tokyo Love Story	Satomi Sekiguchi		
2021	Laid-Back Camp	Ayano Toki	Season 2	
2021	Girl Gun Lady	Matsuko Kadowaki		
2022	Fishbowl Wives			
2023	The Crimes of Those Women	Riko Kumazawa		
2024	Oshi no Ko	Monemone Anemone		

=== Films ===
Year	Title	Role	Notes	Ref.
2012	Gekijō-ban Shiritsu Bakaleya Koukou			
2013	Daijōbu 3-kumi	Anna Kinoshita		
2015	Solomon's Perjury 1: Suspicion	Juri Miyake		
2015	Solomon's Perjury 2: Judgment	Juri Miyake		
2015	Girl's Step	Azusa Nishihara	Lead role	
2016	Live! Love! Sing! Ikite Itoshite Utau Koto Gekijō-ban	Asami Mizushima	Lead role	
2016	If Cats Disappeared from the World	Mika		
2016	Your Lie in April	Tsubaki Sawabe		
2017	Spring Has Come	Riko Tokita	Lead role	
2017	The Blue Hearts	Anna Akiyama		
2017	Tatara Samurai	O-kuni		
2017	The Anthem of the Heart	Natsuki Nito		
2017	Cinema Fighters - Parallel World -	Maya	Short film	
2018	Utamonogatari - Cinema Fighters Project - "Kuu"	Ann	Short film	
2020	The Craft of Memories	Karen	Lead role	
2021	My Blood & Bones in a Flowing Galaxy	Hari Kuramoto	Lead role	
2021	Homunculus	1775		
2022	The Broken Commandment	Shiho		
2025	Kaede	Hiyori Endo		
2025	10Dance	Fusako Yagami		

=== Stage ===
Year	Title	Notes	Ref.
2020	Reading drama Book Act "Entertainer Exchange Diary / Geinin koukan nikki"		

=== Web series ===
Year	Title	Notes	Ref.
2019–present	E-girls meets Dance Battle Documentary		

=== Commercials ===
Year	Title	Notes	Ref.
2012	Otsuka Pocari Sweat		
2013	ABC-Mart adidas adihoney in heel		
2013	NTT DoCoMo d-Video powered by BeeTV		
2014	Benesse Shinken Zemi		
2014	Benesse Shinken Zemi Kōkōkoza		
2014	Sekisui House		
2015	Recruit Rikunabi Shingaku		
2015	Sangetsu "Kiiro no Restaurant"		
2017	Japan Post		
2017	Nissin Foods' Cup Noodle "Hungry Days" Girls of the Alps (as Heidi)		
2018	JT Omouta "Aisuru hito wo omou"		
2019	JT Omouta "Shimai wo omou"		

=== Music videos ===
Year	Song	Artist	Notes	Ref.
2011	Rising Sun	Exile		
2011	Each Other's Way ~Tabi no Tochū~	Exile		
2015	Unfair World	Sandaime J Soul Brothers		
2017	Y.M.C.A.	Generations from Exile Tribe		
2024	Fuyu to Haru	Back Number		

=== Runways ===
Year	Title	Season	Notes	Ref.
2012	Girls Award	Autumn/Winter		

== Awards and nominations ==
Year presented, name of the award ceremony, category, nominee(s) of the award, and the result of the nomination
Year	Award ceremony	Category	Nominated work(s)	Result	Ref.
2015	58th Blue Ribbon Awards	Best Newcomer	Solomon's Perjury and Girls Step	Won	
