= Happiness (group) =

Japanese idol group

- Origin: Japan
- Genre: J-pop
- Years active: 2008–2023
- Labels: Universal Sigma (2008–2012); Nayutawave (2013); Rhythm Zone (2014–2023); LDH
- Past members: Sayaka; Kaede; Karen Fujii; Miyuu; Ruri Kawamoto; Mimu; Mayu Sugieda; Yurino; Anna Suda

Happiness was a Japanese pop girl group formed and managed by LDH since 2008 and signed to the record label Rhythm Zone. They were a dance and vocal unit of collective girl group E-girls alongside Dream and Flower. The group consisted of two vocalists and three performers at the time of their disbandment.

== History ==
=== Pre-debut and indie debut ===
Happiness first appeared during Exile's 2008 Live Tour as backup dancers, at the time being a five-member unit consisting of Miyuu, Mimu, Karen, Sayaka, and Kaede. On April 10, 2009, it was announced that LDH would hold auditions to recruit vocalists for the new girlgroup, specifically aiming at girls aged 12–14. Yurino was then added to the group after an LDH Audition before the group was set to debut. They released their debut DVD single, "Happy Talk", on October 21, 2009. It was also used as the theme song for Japanese brand Mister Donuts.

=== 2009–2012: Major label, first album Happy Time and E-girls formation ===
Mayu Sugieda was added to the group and announced on December 25, 2009, before the group made their major debut on February 9, 2011, with the release of their first major label single, "Kiss Me". Four days before their debut, the group held a live event to promote the upcoming release of their first single that attracted about 1000 spectators. The group released their 2nd single "Friends" on April 27 in the same year. Two days later, they held their first solo show at SHIBUYA-AX in Tokyo. For the release of their 3rd single "Wish" on August 17, Happiness held their first surprise live event in front of SHIBUYA 109 in Tokyo, proving their popularity among teenage girls. Mimu was absent from the group's promotions after going on hiatus in December 2011, including their 4th single "We Can Fly", before leaving the group in October 2012, citing she wanted to focus on her studies.

In November 2011, Happiness was confirmed to be joining sister groups Dream and Flower in the collective group E-girls. Member Mayu also went on a hiatus in August 2012 to undergo medical treatment after being diagnosed with infectious mononucleosis.

On June 6, 2012, it was announced that Happiness would release their first album titled Happy Time on June 20. The track-list of the album included a cover of SPEED's "Body & Soul".

=== 2013–2014: Addition of Anna and Ruri, competition with Flower and Mayu's departure ===
E-girls members Anna Suda and Ruri Kawamoto joined the group in May 2013 as a dancer and vocalist respectively, and the group released their 5th single, "Sunshine Dream: Ichido Kiri no Natsu". It was released on the same day as Flower's 5th single ""Taiyou to Himawari" (太陽と向日葵; Sun and Sunflower) to initiate a competition between the two groups. The winner of the competition would have one of their songs feature as a B-side on a future E-girls' single. Two weeks after the release, it was revealed via Exile's TV show Shuukan EXILE, that Happiness lost the battle by 2 points against 3 of Flower. As a reward, Flower's song "Hatsukoi" (初恋; First Love) was included in E-girls' single "Gomennasai no Kissing You".

Miyuu was announced as the new leader of the group, replacing Mimu on January 30, 2014. Mayu Sugieda, after months of hiatus, left both Happiness and E-girls on April 7, 2014. Happiness continued to promote with E-girls, releasing their 6th single, "Juicy Love", on May 28, 2014 and their 7th single, "Seek A Light", on November 19, 2014, between E-girls singles. These singles were also the first ones after Happiness' label transfer from Nayutawave to Avex' Rhythm Zone.

=== 2015–2016: Second studio album GIRLZ N' EFFECT and first tour ===
Happiness announced the release of their 8th single, "Holiday" on August 28, 2015, set to be released on October 14. It served as a turning point in Happiness' sound and concept, marking the start of a more mature, energetic and colorful image of the group. The title track was produced by T.Kura, who had worked with artists such as Exile and Namie Amuro before. Furthermore, NIGO, creator of fashion brands Bathing Ape and Human Made, was in charge of the art and visual direction for the promotional photo shoots for this single. The T-shirts worn by the Happiness members in their artist photos and in the music video were also co-designed by NIGO and Naoto, member of Exile/Sandaime J Soul Brothers/Honest Boyz.

On February 3, 2016, Happiness released their 9th single, "Sexy Young Beautiful". The release is a unique one meant to display the group's singing, rapping, and dancing ability. The covers for the single were designed by NIGO too. On May 28 in the same year, it was announced that Happiness would release the song "Always" as the theme song for the live action adaptation of the manga Itazura na Kiss ~ THE MOVIE ~ Part 1 Highschool-hen (イタズラなKiss～THE MOVIE～ Part1ハイスクール編; Mischievous Kiss~ THE MOVIE ~ Part 1 High School Edition) that would be released in November. On August 11, 2016, it was revealed on E-girls' last day of their third tour E-girls LIVE TOUR 2016 "E.G. SMILE", that Happiness will be releasing their second album GIRLZ N' EFFECT on October 12, 2016. They also announced the group's first solo tour Happiness LIVE TOUR 2016 GIRLZ N' EFFECT that would go from November 9 until December 20, 2016.

=== 2017–2023: Singles, E.G.family's first tour and disbandment ===
The group released their 10th single "REWIND" on February 8, 2017, the day before the 6th anniversary of their debut. On March 10, 2017, it was announced that Miyuu would undergo surgery on her left knee due to a lateral meniscus injury and halt her activities until she was fully rehabilitated. On August 27 in the same year, the group participated on the annual festival a-nation, being their first time participating in it. The group released their 11th single "GOLD" on September 10, 2017. The single ranked #1 on Oricon's weekly singles chart on the following week, being their first #1 single.

After over a year of hiatus, the group released their first digital single "POWER GIRLS" On January 16, 2019. The group participated in E.G.family's first tour E.G.POWER 2019 ~POWER to the DOME~ that went from February 22 to May 25, 2019. On March 1, it was announced that Ruri, Kaede and Sayaka were appointed as ambassadors for DeNA's YOKOHAMA GIRLS☆FESTIVAL 2019 Supported by ありあけ 横濱ハーバー from May 31 to June 2. For this occasion, Ruri sang the national anthem of Japan and Kaede threw the opening pitch for the baseball game on the first day of the festival. On June 12, 2019, the group released "POWER GIRLS" as their twelfth single. On September 11 in the same year, Happiness released their 13th single "Chao Chao". The music video for the title track was shot at Pacific Park on the Santa Monica Pier and in the Bradbury Building in Los Angeles. The release of the new single was accompanied by a row of promotional live-events across Japan.

During the announcement of E-girls' plan to dissolve at the end of 2020 on December 22, 2019, it was revealed that Happiness would stay as they are and will work with 88rising for global expansion in the future.

On December 15, 2020, members Yurino and Anna Suda announced they would be leaving LDH, therefore also graduating from Happiness. In 2022 members Sayaka, Ruri, Miyuu, and Kaede announced that they were forming the group SG5, or Sailor Guardians 5, with iScream's Rui. The members promoted concurrently between the groups.

On June 5, 2023, LDH announced that Happiness would be disbanding after its last concert on September 26, 2023. After the disbandment, Karen Fujii would be dedicating to her individual activities while the remaining members would focus on SG5. Before their last concert, the group held fan meetings in four cities of Japan from July to August. On September 26, 2023, the group held their last live concert titled Happiness LAST LIVE 2023 "Happiness" in KT Zepp Yokohama and officially disbanded following its conclusion.

== Members ==
=== Final line-up ===
Name	Stage Name	Position	Date of birth	Birthplace	Notes
Miyuu Ariiso (有磯実結)	MIYUU (ミユウ)	Leader & Performer	August 16, 1996 (age 30)	Kanagawa, Japan	Former member of E-girls
Karen Fujii (藤井夏恋)		Vocalist	July 16, 1996 (age 30)	Osaka, Japan	Former member of E-girls and ShuuKaRen
Ruri Kawamoto (川本璃)		Vocalist	April 12, 1996 (age 30)	Osaka Prefecture, Japan	Former member of E-girls
Sayaka Nagatomo (長友さやか)	SAYAKA (サヤカ)	Performer	September 20, 1995 (age 31)	Miyazaki Prefecture, Japan	Former member of E-girls
Kaede Dobashi (土橋楓)	Kaede (楓)	Performer	January 11, 1996 (age 30)	Kanagawa Prefecture, Japan	Former member of E-girls and member of model duo Twin Tower

=== Former members ===
Name	Stage Name	Position	Date of birth	Birthplace	Notes
Mimu Hioki (日置美夢)	MIMU (ミム)	Performer	December 30, 1995 (age 30)	Hyogo, Japan	Former member of E-girls, re-debuted in the duo ITI as a vocalist in 2015
Mayu Sugieda (杉枝真結)		Vocalist	January 2, 1996 (age 30)	Osaka Prefecture, Japan	Former member of E-girls, model under the agency Next Satisfaction
Yurino Suzuki (鈴木結莉乃)	YURINO (ユリノ)	Performer	February 6, 1996 (age 30)	Miyazaki, Japan	Former member of E-girls and SudannaYuzuYully
Anna Suda (須田アンナ)		Performer	October 12, 1997 (age 29)	Tokyo Prefecture, Japan	Former member of E-girls and SudannaYuzuYully

== Discography ==
=== Albums ===
List of albums, with selected chart positions
Title	Album details	Peak chart position	
Title	Album details	JPN Oricon	JPN Billboard (Note: Sources for chart positions are as follows: Girlz N' Effect.)
Happy Time	Released: June 20, 2012; Format: LP, digital download; Label: Universal Sigma	10	— (Note: The album was released prior to the establishment of the Japan Hot Album, hence why did not enter the chart but it peaked at number 15 on the Billboard Top Album Sales chart.)
Girlz N' Effect	Released: October 12, 2016; Format: CD, digital download; Label: Rhythm Zone	2	3

=== Singles ===
List of singles, with selected chart positions and certifications
Title	Year	Peak chart positions		Sales (Oricon) (Note: Sales provided by Oricon database and are rounded to the nearest thousand.)	Album
Title	Year	JPN Oricon	JPN Hot (Note: Sources for chart positions are as follows: "Kiss Me", "Wish", "We Can Fly", "Sunshine Dream: Ichido Kiri no Natsu", "Juicy Love", "Seek A Light", "Holiday", "Sexy Young Beautiful", "Rewind", "Gold".)	Sales (Oricon)	Album
"Happy Talk" (Note: Released as a DVD single.)	2009	138 (Note: Charted on the DVD chart.)	—	—N/a	Happy Time
"Kiss Me"	2011	22	88	8,000	Happy Time
"Friends"	2011	20	—	6,000	Happy Time
"Wish"	2011	12	27	15,000	Happy Time
"We Can Fly"	2012	19	19	10,000	Happy Time
"Sunshine Dream: Ichido Kiri no Natsu"	2013	7	11	37,000	Non-album single
"Juicy Love"	2014	7	9	30,000	Girlz N' Effect
"Seek A Light"	2014	7	24	28,000	Girlz N' Effect
"Holiday"	2015	2	3	55,000	Girlz N' Effect
"Sexy Young Beautiful"	2016	5	4	16,000	Girlz N' Effect
"Rewind"	2017	4	5	36,000	Non-album singles
"Gold"	2017	1	3	45,000	Non-album singles
"Power Girls"	2019	8	—	15,000	Non-album singles
"Chao Chao"	2019	6	—	26,000	Non-album singles
"Everything"	2022	—	—	Digital single	Non-album singles
"—" denotes releases that did not chart or were not released in that territory.

=== Other charted songs ===
List of songs, with selected chart positions
Title	Year	Peak	Album
Title	Year	JPN Hot (Note: Sources for chart positions are as follows: "Ordinary Girls",)	Album
"Ordinary Girls"	2016	16	Girlz N' Effect

=== Participating works ===
Year	Release date	Title	Artist	Album
2011	June 29	Really Into You	DJ Makidai feat. Happiness	(digital single)
2014	June 18	Really Into You (Sound Goes Around Remix)	DJ Makidai feat. Happiness	Treasure MIX 3
2017	February 1	Pocket	Dance Earth Party feat. Happiness	I

== Tie-up ==
Song	Tie-up	Tracklist
Happy Talk	Mister Donut CM theme song	Album "Happy Time"
Friends	Tokyo☆Bookmark CM song	Album "Happy Time"
Wish	TV show CDTV opening theme song for the month of August	Album "Happy Time"
We Can Fly	TV show Piramekino ending theme song	Album "Happy Time"
Holiday	e-ma CM theme song	Album "Girlz N' Effect"

== Tours ==
=== As a lead artist ===
Year	Period	Title
2016 - 2017	from November 9, 2016, to January 17, 2017	Happiness LIVE TOUR 2016 GIRLZ N' EFFECT
2023	September 26, 2023	Happiness LAST LIVE 2023 "Happiness"

=== As a participating group ===
Year	Title	Artist
2014	E-girls LIVE TOUR 2014 "COLORFUL LAND"	E-girls
2015	E-girls LIVE TOUR 2015 "COLORFUL WORLD"	E-girls
2016	E-girls LIVE TOUR 2016 "E.G. SMILE"	E-girls
2017	E-girls LIVE 2017 ~E.G.EVOLUTION~	E-girls
2019	E.G.POWER 2019 ~POWER to the DOME~	E.G.Family
2020	E-girls PERFECT LIVE 2011▶2020	E-girls

== Filmography ==
=== Music videos ===
Year	Release date	Title	Artist	Album
2009	April 15	"Someday (Kodomo Version)"	Exile	
2011	March 7	"24karats STAY GOLD (KIDS & GIRLS version)"	Exile	
2011	September 24	"Rising Sun"	Exile	
2013	October 2	"Gomennasai no Kissing You"	E-girls	
2014	July 9	"E.G. Anthem -WE ARE VENUS-"	E-girls	

=== Commercials ===
Year	Title	Ref.
2009	Mister Donut	
