= Yoshihiro Usami =

Japanese dancer and musician

Üsa 宇佐美 吉啓
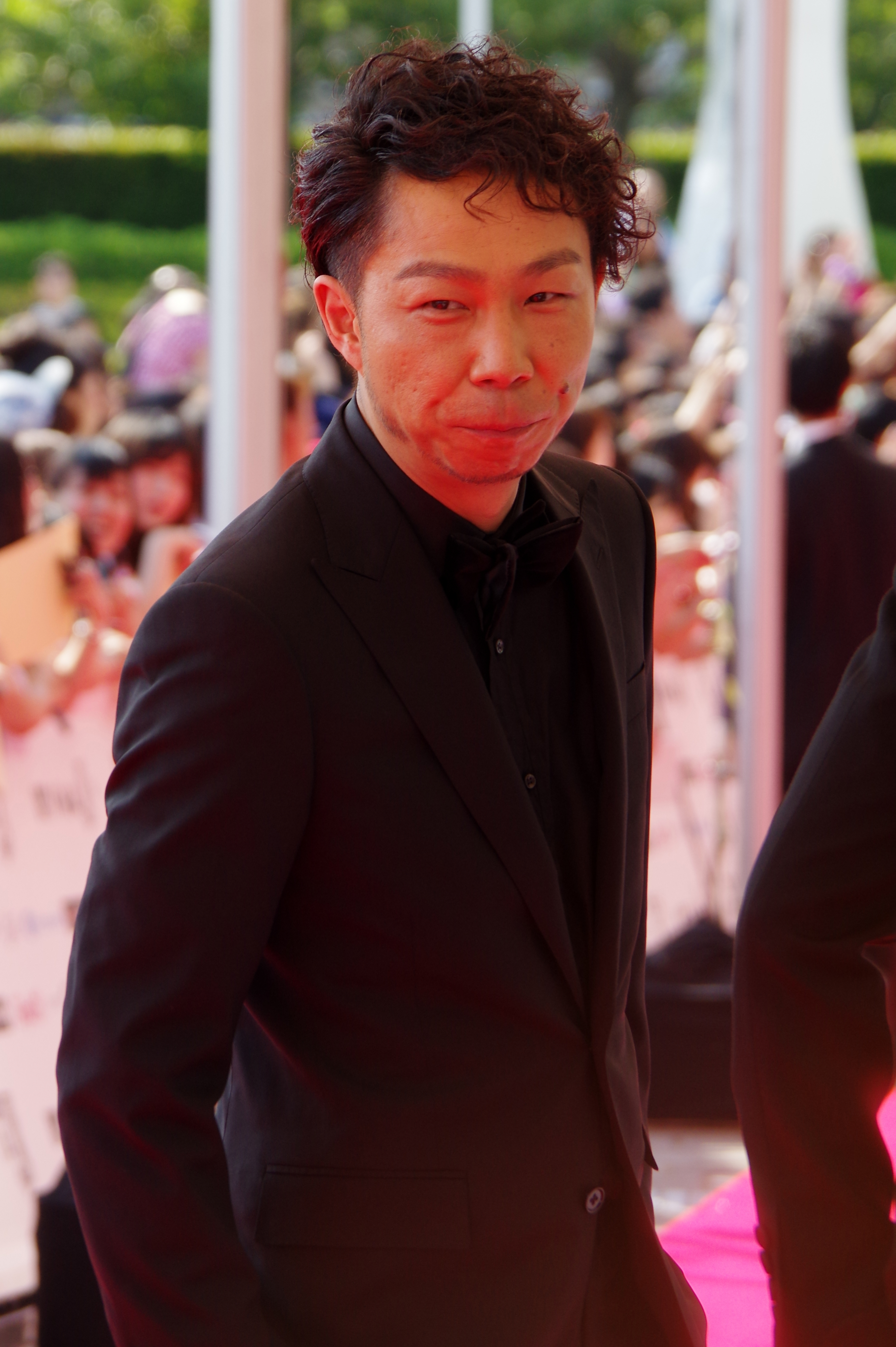
- Usami at the 2014 MTV Video Music Awards Japan

Background information
- Born: Yoshihiro Usami; 2 February 1977 (age 49); Kanagawa Prefecture, Japan
- Occupations: Dancer, singer
- Years active: 1994–present
- Label: Rhythm Zone
- Formerly of: Exile; Dance Earth Party
- Website: Official website

Yoshihiro Usami (宇佐美 吉啓, Usami Yoshihiro; nicknamed Üsa and Exile Üsa (stylized as ÜSA and EXILE ÜSA); born 2 February 1977, in Yokohama, Kanagawa Prefecture) is a Japanese dancer. He is a member of Exile in which he is a former performer and a member of Dance Earth Party. He is a former member of the first generation J Soul Brothers and Rather Unique. He is married to actress Arisa Sugi since 2017.

== Career ==
In 1994, Usami, along with Toshio Matsumoto and Makidai, formed the dance team Baby Nail.

In 1998, he joined the dance team Japanese Soul Brothers.

In 1999, Usami joined the first generation J Soul Brothers, and made their debut in 20 October with their eponymous single "J Soul Brothers".

On 24 August 2001, the J Soul Brothers were renamed into Exile, and re-debuted in 27 September with the single "Your eyes only –Aimaina boku no Rinkaku–".

In 2004, he organized the group Rather Unique.

In June 2006, Usami made his acting debut in the stage play The Mensetsu.

Later in the same year, he started the dance project Dance Earth.

On 29 April 2015, Usami changed his name Usa (stylized as USA) to Üsa. Later in 22 June, he, along with Matsumoto and Makidai, announced that he will retire from performing with Exile at the end of the year. On 31 December, Usami's last performance with Exile was in the Tokyo Broadcasting System series CDTV Special! Toshikoshi Premiere Live 2015→2016.

== Personal life ==
On October 22, 2017, it was announced that Üsa had married actress Arisa Sugi after 7 years of dating.

On September 21, 2018, the couple revealed to be expecting their first child. At this time Arisa Sugi also announced she will be joining LDH Japan.

On February 21, 2019, they welcomed their first son.

== Participating groups ==
Name	Period of time	Ref.
Baby Nail	1994 – 1998	
Hip Hop Junkeez	1998	
J Soul Brothers	1999 – 24 August 2001	
Exile	24 Aug 2001 –	
Rather Unique	2004 – 2006	
Dance Earth Party	2013 – 2018	

== Filmography ==
※Bold roles are shown as his starring works

Year	Title	Role
2006	The Mensetsu	
2007	Taiyō ni Yaka rete	Takuya
2008	Crown –Nemuri-ra nai, Yoru no Hate ni...	Juuyuu
2009	Hebihimesama: Waga Kokoro no Na Hebi	Denji, Gonpachi
2010	Dance Earth –Negai–	Yu
2013	Dance Earth –Seimei no Kodō–	Piero
2014	Changes	Ooyabi

=== Films ===
Year	Title	Role
2010	Kyoto Uzumasa Monogatari	Kota Yanase
2013	Dance Earth –Beat Trip–	

=== TV programmes ===
Year	Title	Network	Notes	Ref.
2010	Shūkan Exile	TBS	MC	
2013	E Dance Academy	NHK-E	Senior lecturer	
2013	Zip!	NTV	"Asa Dance Taisō"	
2013	Nekketsu! Dance Academy	TV Tokyo	Dance instructor	
2014	Exile Usa Dance Earth Channel	CS Dance Channel		
2015	Chikyū Bus Kikō	BS-TBS	Narration	

=== Advertisements ===
Year	Title
2011	Recruit Hot Pepper Gourmet
2012	GREE "Seisen Cerberus"
2012	Fujitsu Arrows
2013	Hisamitsu Pharmaceutical "Air Salon Path"

=== Radio ===
Year	Title	Network
2006	Evolution D	InterFM
2008	Black room	InterFM

=== Voice acting ===
Year	Title	Role
2008	Examurai	Usa

=== Music videos ===
Year	Title
2010	Exile "Negai"

=== Magazine serialisations ===
Year	Title
2013	Sotokoto

=== Others ===
Year	Title	Notes	Ref.
2015	Furusato Matsuri Tokyo: Nihon no matsuri Furusato no Aji	Japan festival navigator	
2016	Netflix Original Drama Get Down	Japan Ambassador	

== Bibliography ==
=== Books ===
Year	Title	ISBN
2016	Kizuna	ISBN 978-4344028760
