= Aisubeki Mirai e =

Studio album by Exile
- Released: December 2, 2009
- Recorded: 2008–2009
- Genre: Pop, R&B
- Length: 71:01 (Standard Edition)
- Label: Rhythm Zone
- Producer: Exile, Max Matsuura

Exile chronology
Exile Ballad Best (2008)	Aisubeki Mirai e (2009)	Negai no Tō (2011)

Aisubeki Mirai e (愛すべき未来へ, lit. "To the Lovable Future") is the seventh studio album by Japanese group Exile, released by Rhythm Zone on December 2, 2009. It is also their first studio album performed by 14 members following a merger with Nidaime J Soul Brothers.

The album includes their CD singles' title tunes "Ti Amo," "Someday," "Fireworks" and "Futatsu no Kuchibiru." "Ti Amo" and "Someday" won the grand prix awards at the 50th and 51st Japan Record Awards respectively.

Aisubeki Mirai e debuted at the number-one position on the Japanese Oricon daily album charts with the sales of around 229,000 copies in the first day. With the weekly sales of around 730,000 copies, it also debuted at the number-one position on the Oricon weekly album charts. Aisubeki Mirai e was certified Million by the Recording Industry Association of Japan for the shipment of 1,000,000 copies.

== Track listing ==
1. Someday
2. Shooting Star
3. Your Smile
4. Yasashii Hikari (優しい光, lit. "Soft Light")
5. If ~I Know~
6. Ti Amo
7. Futatsu no Kuchibiru (ふたつの唇, lit. "Two Lips")
8. A Leaf (Rasenjō no Sayonara) (A leaf〜螺旋状のサヨナラ〜, lit. "A Leaf Good-bye Spiral")
9. Heavenly White
10. The Next Door
11. Fireworks
12. Generation
13. Angel
14. Forever Love
15. Aisubeki Mirai e (愛すべき未来へ, lit. "To the Lovable Future")
