= Dance Earth Party =

Japanese dance music group

- Also known as: DANCE EARTH PARTY; DEP; ダンス・アース・パーティー
- Origin: Japan
- Genres: Dance-pop, Alternative
- Years active: 2013-2018
- Labels: LDH, Rhythm Zone
- Past members: Exile Üsa; Exile Tetsuya; Dream Shizuka; Crystal Kay; Exile Nesmith; Naoki Kobayashi; Mandy Sekiguchi; Dream Aya; Dream Ami; Dream Erie

Dance Earth Party (Japanese: ダンス・アース・パーティー, also stylized as DANCE EARTH PARTY or known by their acronym DEP) is a Japanese Dance-pop coed group created and managed by LDH since 2013. They are a dance-vocal unit which is part of Exile Üsa's philanthropic Dance Earth project and signed to the record label Rhythm Zone. The group's line-up consisted of different LDH artists for the first 2 years until a fixed set of 3 members got announced in 2015. This trio included Exile Üsa, Exile Tetsuya and Dream Shizuka, making this unit the bridge between Exile Tribe and E.G.family within LDH.

The musical style of this group is heavily influenced by different cultures from around the world due to its connection to the Dance Earth project, which focuses on conveying happiness and bringing people together through music and dance. This is also reflected in the choice of artists featured in their songs and locations their music videos are shot at.

== History ==
=== 2013: Group formation and debut ===
Dance Earth is a philanthropic entertainment project founded by Exile Üsa in 2008, to connect the world by dance. Dance Earth Party was created in 2013 for this project, including vocalists and performers from various groups.

In 2013, the line-up consisted of Exile Üsa, Exile Tetsuya, Exile Nesmith and Crystal Kay. The group released their debut single "Inochi no Rhythm" on January 16 under the record label UNIVERSAL SIGMA. The song was used for the project DANCE EARTH ~Seimei no Kodo~ and it was the only single to be released under UNIVERSAL SIGMA.

=== 2014: Record label and line-up change ===
In 2014, the unit moved record labels from UNIVERSAL SIGMA to Rhythm Zone from Avex.

For the project Changes, the line-up consisted of Exile Üsa, Exile Tetsuya, Naoki Kobayashi, Mandy Sekiguchi and Dream members Shizuka, Aya, Ami and Erie. The unit released the single "PEACE SUNSHINE" on April 16.

=== 2015-2018: Fixed line-up, Dance Earth Festival, first album and hiatus ===
In 2015, it was announced the unit would get a fixed line-up with members Üsa, Tetsuya and Shizuka. The first single of the new line-up and third single of the group in general "BEAUTIFUL NAME" was released on August 5, 2015, featuring The Skatalites and Ryuji Imaichi from Sandaime J Soul Brothers. The group released their fourth single "DREAMERS' PARADISE" on November 25, 2015, featuring Rhymester's member Mummy-D.

On August 3, 2016, Dance Earth Party released their fifth single "NEO ZIPANG ~UTAGE~" featuring banvox and Drum Tao. On October 15, 2016, the group established and realized the DANCE EARTH FESTIVAL '16, at Chiba Makuhari Beach Park with various events including performances by artists inside and outside LDH and also including DEP. On the same day, the group released two digital singles "To The World" and "HEART OF A LION", previously only available for streaming on AWA. On December 2, 2016, the group announced their first album I, released on February 1, 2017.

On May 13, 2017, it was announced that the DANCE EARTH FESTIVAL 2017 would be held in October 14 and 15, with Exile The Second as guests on the 15th. A new song, "WAVE", was also announced. The song was released as a digital single on June 9, 2017.

The group released their 6th single "POPCORN" on August 30, 2017.

On March 14, 2018, the group released their 7th single "Anuenue". The single include footage of the DANCE EARTH FESTIVAL 2017. On July 14, 15 and 16, the DANCE EARTH FESTIVAL 2018 ~SPLASH SUMMER~ was held. On July 14, 2018, the group also released the single "HAPPiLA" in MUSIC CARD format and digitally on July 17. The song features Generations from Exile Tribe.

On December 4, 2018, it was announced that the group as a fixed unit ended its activities but the group can return and restart its activities in the future with a rotative line-up.

== Members ==
=== Fixed members ===
Name	Position	Years active within Group	Date of birth	Other groups
Exile Üsa	performer	2013 - 2018	February 2, 1977 (age 45)	Exile
Exile Tetsuya	performer	2013 - 2018	February 18, 1981 (age 41)	Exile Exile The Second
Dream Shizuka	vocalist	2014 - 2018	March 6, 1988 (age 34)	Dream (formerly) E-girls (formerly)

=== Temporary members ===
Name	Position	Years active within Group	Date of birth	Other groups
Crystal Kay	vocalist	2013	February 26, 1986 (age 36)	
Exile Nesmith	vocalist	2013	August 1, 1983 (age 39)	Exile Exile The Second
Naoki Kobayashi	performer	2014	November 10, 1984 (age 37)	Exile Sandaime J Soul Brothers
Mandy Sekiguchi	performer	2014	January 25, 1991 (age 31)	Exile Generations from Exile Tribe Honest Boyz
Dream Aya	vocalist	2014	July 16, 1987 (age 35)	Dream (formerly) E-girls (formerly)
Dream Ami	vocalist	2014	May 11, 1988 (age 34)	Dream (formerly) E-girls (formerly)
Dream Erie	vocalist	2014	September 3, 1987 (age 35)	Dream (formerly) E-girls (formerly)

== Discography ==
=== Studio albums ===
Title	Album details	Sales	Certifications
I	Released: February 1, 2017; Label: Rhythm Zone; Formats: CD, CD/2DVD, CD/2Blu-ray	TBA	TBA

=== Singles ===
Title	Details	Sales	Certifications
Inochi no Rhythm	Released: January 16, 2013; Label: Universal Sigma; Formats: CD, CD/DVD	TBA	TBA
PEACE SUNSHINE	Released: April 16, 2014; Label: Rhythm Zone; Formats: CD, CD/DVD	TBA	TBA
BEAUTIFUL NAME	Released: August 5, 2015; Label: Rhythm Zone; Formats: CD, CD/DVD	TBA	TBA
DREAMERS' PARADISE	Released: November 25, 2015; Label: Rhythm Zone; Formats: CD, CD/DVD	TBA	TBA
NEO ZIPANG ~UTAGE~	Released: August 3, 2016; Label: Rhythm Zone; Formats: CD, CD/DVD	TBA	TBA
POPCORN	Released: August 30, 2017; Label: Rhythm Zone; Formats: CD, CD/DVD	TBA	TBA
Anuenue	Released: March 14, 2018; Label: Rhythm Zone; Formats: CD, CD/DVD, CD/3DVD, CD/3Blu-ray	TBA	TBA

=== Digital singles ===
Year	Title	Release date	Sales	Certifications
2016	To The World	September 23	TBA	TBA
2016	HEART OF A LION	October 5	TBA	TBA
2017	WAVE	June 9	TBA	TBA
2018	HAPPiLA	July 17	TBA	TBA
