= Makidai =

Japanese dancer (born 1975)

- Born: Daisuke Maki (眞木 大輔, Maki Daisuke); 27 October 1975 (age 50); Sakae-ku, Yokohama, Kanagawa Prefecture, Japan
- Other names: DJ Makidai; Exile Makidai
- Occupations: Dancer; DJ; actor; television presenter
- Years active: 1994–
- Notable work: Film; Shibuya-ku Maruyama-chō; Koisuru Neapolitan; Stage; Red Cliff: Sen
- Television: Town Doctor Jumbo!!; Hotman 2; Hitomi
- Height: 180 cm (5 ft 11 in)
- Website: Official website

Makidai (stylized as MAKIDAI; born 27 October 1975, in Sakae-ku, Yokohama, Kanagawa Prefecture) is a Japanese dancer, DJ, actor and television presenter. He is a former performer of Exile and member of PKCZ. He is a former member of the first generation J Soul Brothers and Rather Unique.

Makidai is represented with LDH.

== Participating groups ==
Name	Period of time	Ref.
Baby Nail	1994 – 1998	
Hip Hop Junkeez	1998	
J Soul Brothers	1999 – 24 August 2001	
Exile	24 August 2001 –	
Rather Unique	2004 – September 2006	
PKCZ	2014 –	

== Filmography ==
※ Bold roles are shown as his starring roles

=== TV dramas ===
Year	Title	Role	Network	Notes
2004	Hotman 2	Osamu Ikegami	TBS	
2007	On The Way Comedy Michikusa Vol. 2 Saki kake no penpengusa-hen: Taxi Q			DVD drama
2008	Hitomi	Ken	NHK	
2008	Koi no kara Sawagi –Love Stories V–: Kinboshi kara Kita Onna	Sensui Arima	NTV	
2009	Tantei M	M	NTV	
2013	Town Doctor Jumbo!!	Masayoshi Tsuruta	YTV	
2014	Tokkō Jimuin Minowa	Sobaya	YTV	Episode 3

=== Films ===
Year	Title	Role
2007	Shibuya-ku Maruyama-chō	Yamaken
2008	Kimi ni Todoku Koe	Yuichiro Kitaoka
2009	Byakuya	Tatsuo Kijima
2009	Killer Virgin Road	Kenichi Egashira
2010	Koisuru Neapolitan: Sekai de Ichiban oishī Aisa Re-kata	Yuki Makihara
2014	Oretachi no Ashita	Ryu Fudo

=== Stage ===
Year	Title	Role
2007	Taiyō ni Yaka rete	Date
2010	Closer	Rally
2011	Love Letters	Andy
2011	Red Cliff: Sen	Cao Cao
2012	Kagemusha Dokuganryū	Masamune Date

=== TV programmes ===
Year	Title	Network	Notes	Ref.
2009	EXH: Exile House	TBS	MC	
2009	Sanma & Exile no Sekai ni Hitotsudake no Uta	TV Asahi	MC	
2010	Shūkan Exile	TBS	MC	
2011	Zip!	NTV	Main Tuesday personality	

=== Advertisements ===
Year	Title
2009	Toyota Wish
2009	Meiji Fran
2009	Kosé Cosme Port "Cosmagic"
2010	Rohto Z!
2010	Kirin "Otona no Kirin Lemon"
2011	Fujitsu Arrows
2011	Recruit Hot Pepper
2012	GREE "Seisen Cerberus"
2012	Fujitsu Arrows Tab Wi-Fi
2013	The Coca-Cola Company Coca-Cola Zero
2014	Beats Electronics
2015	Bandai Namco Entertainment Taiko no Tatsujin

=== Radio ===
Year	Title	Network	Notes
2005	Oh! My Radio	J-Wave	
2014	Music Unlimited Tokyo Vagabond	J-Wave	Monday navigator

=== Voice acting ===
Year	Title	Role	Notes
2008	Examurai	Makidai	
2008	Hancock	Ray Embry (Jason Bateman)	Japanese dub

=== Music videos ===
Year	Title
1998	Misia "Tsutsumikomu Yō ni..."
2008	Color "ain't so easy"

=== Advertising ===
Year	Title	Ref.
2010	Emporio Armani	

== Bibliography ==
=== Books ===
Year	Title	ISBN
2016	Kizuna	ISBN 978-4344028760

== DJ Makidai ==
DJ Makidai
- Also known as: Makidai
- Born: Daisuke Maki; 27 October 1975 (age 50); Yokohama, Kanagawa Prefecture, Japan
- Genres: Hip hop; EDM
- Occupation: DJ
- Years active: 2002–
- Labels: Universal Sigma (2008–11); Rhythm Zone (2014–)
- Website: Official website

DJ Makidai (stylized as DJ MAKIDAI) is the DJ name of the former Exile performer Makidai. He is a member of PKCZ. His record label is Rhythm Zone.

=== Discography ===
Year	Title	Oricon weekly rank
2008	DJ Makidai from Exile Treasure Mix	3
2009	DJ Makidai from Exile Treasure Mix 2	4
2011	DJ Makidai from Exile Treasure Mix 3	9
2014	Exile Tribe Perfect Mix	7

=== Participating works ===
Year	Artist	Album/DVD	Song
2002	Exile	our style	"D.T.B"
2002	Exile	our style	"Feel the Conflict"
2003	Exile		"Styles of Beyond"
2003	Exile		"Let Me Luv U Down feat. Zeebra & Maccho (Ozrosaurus)"
2004	Tsuyoshi Nagabuchi	Hey Aniki!	"Jeep (Remix)"
2004	Tsuyoshi Nagabuchi	Hey Aniki!	"Shiawase ni narou yo '04"
2005	Glay×Exile		"Scream"
2009	Exile	The Hurricane -Fireworks-	"Won't Be Long -Live Version-"
2009	Exile	Exile Live Tour 2009 "The Monster"	"Won't Be Long"
2011	Exile	Negai no Tō	"Won't Be Long"
2012	Exile Tribe	Exile Tribe Live Tour 2012 -Tower Of Wish-	"DJ Makidai"
2013	Exile The Second		"Survivors feat DJ Makidai from Exile"

=== Live ===
Year	Title
2012	Exile Tribe Live Tour 2012 -Tower Of Wish-
2014	Exile Tribe Perfect Year 2014 Special Stage DJ Makidai presents "Club Exile"
