= Dream Shizuka =

Japanese singer and actress (born 1998)

Shizuka Nishida 西田 静香
- Also known as: Dream Shizuka: Shizuka
- Born: March 6, 1988 (age 37); Osaka, Japan
- Genres: J-Pop, Pop
- Occupations: singer, actress, performer
- Years active: 2002-present
- Labels: avex trax (2002-2008); Rhythm Zone (2009-2017); LDH Music (2019-present)

Shizuka Nishida (西田 静香, Nishida Shizuka; born March 6, 1988) better known by her stage name Shizuka and Dream Shizuka, is a Japanese pop singer, actress, and performer. She is a former member of the groups Dream, E-girls, and Dance Earth Party and currently active as a solo artist.

== Early life ==
Shizuka was born on March 6, 1988, in Osaka Prefecture, Japan. Prior to debuting as a singer, she attended CALESS vocal and dance school.

== Career ==
=== 2002-2011: Dream and E-girls ===
On July 7, 2002, Shizuka was announced as one of the new members of dream after successfully passing the audition held by Avex, joining alongside Aya Takamoto, Risa Ai, Sayaka Yamamoto, Ami Nakashima and Erie Abe.

In 2008, with DRM changing their name to Dream and their management to LDH, Shizuka started to use the romanized version of her birth name as her stage name.

Following Kana Tachibana's graduation from Dream on February 19, 2011, Shizuka became the third leader of the group until January 2014, when the leadership was given to Ami. On April 24 in the same year, she was announced as member of E-girls, having a concurrent position in the group and Dream.

=== 2012-2016: Dance Earth Party and acting debut ===
In 2014, Shizuka made her acting debut on the Nippon TV drama Koibumi Biyori (A Perfect Day for Love Letters), being the only cast member to appear in all episodes. In April 2014, she was part of the line-up from the unit Dance Earth Party, participating in the single "PEACE SUNSHINE" together with the other Dream members. She also participated in Dance Earth's project Changes.

On April 29, 2015, during the E-girls LIVE TOUR 2015 "COLORFUL WORLD" concert at Saitama Super Arena, she announced to be a fixed member of Dance Earth Party as the group's vocalist.

In 2016, Shizuka appeared in the short movie Red Skies at Night: The Story of Flower.

=== 2017-2018: Graduation from Dream, E-girls and Dance Earth Party ===
On June 4, 2017, she announced to be graduating from Dream and E-girls with the rebranding of the group as E.G.family after the E-girls LIVE 2017 ~E.G.EVOLUTION~ concerts in July to devote herself as a member of Dance Earth Party. On July 16, she graduated from Dream and E-girls and her stage name became Dream Shizuka.

On December 4, 2018, all Dance Earth Party members announced the group's infinite hiatus. Shizuka would continue her solo activities as Dream Shizuka. She was announced as part of the line-up for EXPG STUDIO's live event REX THE LIVE that was held on December 14 and 15. She also participated in the live event MUSIC BOX Christmas Special Night on December 19, alongside Leola and Crystal Kay.

=== 2019-present: Solo debut with 4FEELS. and E.G.POWER to the DOME ===
On February 6, 2019, Shizuka released the digital single "Kanashimi Kara Hajimaru Monogatari". She participated as a soloist in E.G.family's first tour E.G.POWER 2019 ~POWER to the DOME~ that went from February 22 to May 25. On May 22 in the same year, she made her solo debut with her first single "4 FEELS.".
On February 19, 2020, it was announced that Shizuka would join the main cast of the upcoming Japanese production of the musical Flashdance, taking on the role of the main character's best friend and dancer "Kiki".

== Discography ==
=== Singles ===
Title	Album details	Peak positions
4FEELS.	Released: April 22, 2019; Label: LDH Music; Formats: CD, CD/DVD	15

=== Digital Singles ===
Year	Title	Album
2019	Kanashimi Kara Hajimaru Monogatari	4FEELS.

=== Tie-up ===
Song	Tie-up	Recording	Ref.
Just keep on dreaming	Yomiuri and Nippon Television Network's "Information Live Miyaneya" ending theme song	1st single 4FEELS.	
Paper Dream	HBC Hokkaido Broadcasting Corporation "Ondoki!" opening song of the month of June	1st single 4FEELS.	

== Filmography ==
=== TV Dramas ===
Year	Title	Role	Network	Notes	Ref.
2014	Koibumi Biyori / A Perfect Day for Love Letters	Kiyomi	NTV	Lead role	

=== Films ===
Year	Title	Role	Notes	Ref.
2016	Red Skies at Night: The Story of Flower	Flower	Short film; Lead role	
2016	Fleur	Flower	Short film; Lead role	

=== Stage ===
Year	Title	Notes	Ref.
2019	Honan Gumi Reading Play "Aozora"		
2020	Book Act "Entertainer Exchange Diary / Geinin Kokan Nikki"		
2020	Musical Flashdance	as Kiki	

=== Radio ===
Year	Title	Station	Ref.
2019–present	Dream Shizuka's dream a Dream	FM OH!	

== Other work ==
- Furusato Festival Tokyo ~ A Taste of Japan's Festivals and Hometowns ~ - Japanese Festival Navigator (2018)
