= Michi (Exile song) =

- Front cover of the "CD only" edition of the single.

Single by Exile

from the album Exile Evolution
- Released: February 14, 2007
- Recorded: 2006–2007
- Genre: Pop, R&B
- Length: 4:40 (CD)
- Label: Rhythm Zone; RZCD-45537 (CD+DVD); RZCD-45538 (CD)
- Songwriter: Shogo Kashida

Exile singles chronology
| "Lovers Again" (2006) | "Michi" (2007) | "Summer Time Love" (2007) |

"Michi" (道, Road) is the twenty-third single by Japanese pop band Exile. It was released on February 14, 2007, and was limited to 100,000 copies. The song has been certified as being downloaded more than 1,000,000 times as a ringtone by the RIAJ, and more than 250,000 times as a full-length download to cellphones.

== Track listing ==
=== CD ===
1. "Michi" (道, Road) – 4:40
2. "Michi -Piano Version-" – 4:48
3. "Michi" (Instrumental) – 4:40
4. "Michi -Piano Version-" (Instrumental) – 4:49
5. "Gasshō Dō" (合唱道, The Chorus Way) – 4:16
6. "Gasshō Dō" (Instrumental) – 4:13

=== DVD ===
1. "Michi" (promotional video) – 4:54
2. "Exile's Connection Information" (narrated by Kei Grant)

== Personnel ==
- ATSUSHI – vocals and chorus (tracks 1–4)
- TAKAHIRO – vocals and chorus (tracks 1–4)
- NHK Tokyo Children's Choir – vocals and chorus (tracks 5–6)
- Ritsuyūkai Youth Choir – vocals and chorus (tracks 5–6)
- Shogo Kashida – lyricist
- Miwa Furuse – composer
- Daisuke Kahara – arrangement, programming
