= SudannaYuzuYully =

Japanese musical group

- Also known as: スダンナユズユリー; SYY; Sudannayuzuyully
- Origin: Japan
- Genres: J-pop, Hip hop, Dance-pop
- Years active: 2016-2020
- Labels: LDH, Rhythm Zone
- Spinoff of: E-girls
- Members: Yurino; Sudanna; Yuzuna

SudannaYuzuYully (Japanese: スダンナユズユリー, also known as SYY or Sudannayuzuyully) is a Japanese dance-pop and hip-hop trio formed and managed by LDH since 2017. They are a sub-unit of supergroup E-girls and signed to the record label Rhythm Zone. The name of the group derives from each member's nickname: Anna Suda (Sudanna, スダンナ), Yuzuna (Yuzu, ユズ) and Yurino (Yully, ユリー). This is the first group in which Yurino and Sudanna take on a different position than only being performers. All members are actively taking part in producing and writing the group's music and lyrics.

The group is known for their various endeavors in fashion. They have been featured in several popular Japanese fashion magazines such as Nylon Japan, smart and mini.

== History ==
=== 2016: Group formation ===
On November 9, 2016, it was announced during Happiness' first live tour Happiness Live Tour 2016 Girlz N' Effect that Yurino, Suda Anna and Yuzuna Takebe would form a new unit. On the same day, an official Instagram account of the group started. With Yuzuna being the vocalist and Yurino and Sudanna being rappers, this was the first time both of them would be vocally featured in any E-girls related group.

=== 2017-present: Debut and first album SYY ===
On November 26, 2016, the unit announced to be debuting with the single "Oh Boy" on March 1, 2017 under the label Rhythm Zone. They released their second single "Call Me Now" on August 9 in the same year. In March 2017, the trio was invited to perform at the fashion events Kobe Collection 2017 S/S and Tokyo Girls Collection 2017 S/S. Starting June 2017, the Japanese fashion magazine smart has been publishing a series titled #SYYB focusing on the unit. On October 23, they concluded their activities of 2017 by performing at the ViVi Night in Tokyo 2017 Halloween Party, a fashion event hosted by the magazine ViVi.

In 2018, the trio appeared as opening act of Sandaime J Soul Brothers members CrazyBoy and Hiroomi Tosaka's solo tours during July to December. Furthermore, they were invited to perform at the Asia Song Festival 2018 in South Korea on October 2.

On January 9, 2019, the unit released their first digital single "Look At Me Now". In the same year they participated in E.G.family's first tour E.G. Power 2019 ~Power to the Dome~ from February 22 until May 25. Later that year on March 6, the unit released their first full album called SYY. The cover of the album was designed by artist Jun Inagawa. Shortly after, on March 27, the trio released their first look-book titled SYYM. Furthermore, they were appointed as models for the digital style book titled Benetton Rainbow Machine -Tokyo Edition- promoting a Benetton × Jean-Charles de Castelbajac Capsule Collection, alongside other Japanese artists.

On August 25 it was announced that the unit's new song "Magic Time" would be used as the ending theme for the anime Gundam Build Divers Re:Rise starting October 10.

== Members ==
Name	Position	Date of birth	Other Groups
Yurino Suzuki	rapper, performer	February 6, 1996 (age 29)	E-girls Happiness
Anna Suda	rapper, performer	October 12, 1997 (age 28)	E-girls Happiness
Yuzuna Takebe	vocalist, performer	June 17, 1998 (age 27)	E-girls

== Discography ==
=== Studio albums ===
Title	Album details	Oricon
SYY	Released: March 1, 2019; Label: Rhythm Zone; Formats: CD, CD/DVD, digital download	20

=== Best albums ===
Title	Album details	Oricon
Thank You	Released: December 28, 2020; Label: Rhythm Zone; Formats: CD, CD/DVD, digital download	TBA

=== Singles ===
Title	Album details	Oricon
Oh Boy	Released: March 1, 2017; Label: Rhythm Zone; Formats: CD, CD/DVD, digital download	3
Call Me Now	Released: August 9, 2017; Label: Rhythm Zone; Formats: CD, CD/DVD, digital download	6

=== Digital singles ===
Title	Release date	Billboard Japan
Look At Me Now	January 9, 2019	—
Ten Made Tobaso	February 22, 2019	—
Magic Time	October 10, 2019	—

=== Tie-up ===
Song	Tie-up	Album	Ref.
Hapigora!	GyaO! drama Hapigora! theme song	SYY	
Magic Time	Gundam Channel anime Gundam Build Divers Re:Rise ending theme	Thank You	

== Tours ==
=== As a participating group ===
Year	Title	Artist
2016 - 2017	Happiness Live Tour 2016 Girlz N' Effect	Happiness
2018	E-girls Live Tour 2018 ~E.G. 11~	E-girls
2019	E.G. Power 2019 ~Power to the Doe~	E.G. Family
2020	E-girls Perfect Live 2011▶2020	E-girls

== Bibliography ==
=== Look book ===
Year	Title	Ref.
2019	SYYM	

=== Magazines ===
Year	Title	Notes	Ref.
2017	Jelly	May issue	
2017	Maps	Vol.108, cover	
2017	re-quest/QJ	December issue, cover	
2017–present	Nylon Japan	irregular series	
2017–present	smart #SYYB	series	
2017–present	mini	irregular series	
2018	MSGM Magazine	#02, cover	
2018	WWD Beauty	vol. 516	
2018	Shel'tter Mook	#48	
2018	Evris New Web Magazine		

=== Catalogues ===
Year	Title	Ref.
2019	X-girl 2019 Spring/Summer Special Book	
2019	Benetton Rainbow Machine -Tokyo Edition-	

== Other work ==
=== Radio ===
Year	Title	Network	Ref.
2019	SYY radio	block.fm	
