= E.G.family =

- Origin: Japan
- Years active: 2017-present
- Labels: LDH, Rhythm Zone, Sony Music Japan
- Members: E-girls; Happiness; SudannaYuzuYully; Dream Aya; Dream Ami; Dream Shizuka
- Past members: ShuuKaRen; Dream; Dance Earth Party; Flower

E.G.family is the name given to the collective of artists and groups under Japanese entertainment company LDH related to E-girls. The project was announced on June 5, 2017 and it effectively started on July 17, 2017.

E.G.family was previously a joint project of the groups Dream, Happiness and Flower which was named E-girls. With the evolution of the project, E-girls formally became a group and the brand E-girls became E.G.family. E.G.family is also the female counterpart of EXILE TRIBE.

== History ==
=== 2017-2018: Formation, Shuuka's retirement and Dance Earth Party's hiatus ===
On June 2, 2017, LDH announced that E-girls, an entertainment project founded in April 2011, would evolve into E.G.family. This project would include 7 artists: E-girls, Happiness, Flower, Dream Ami, ShuuKaRen, SudannaYuzuYully and Dance Earth Party. E-girls themselves would continue as an 11-member group. Dream Aya would take on the role of chief creative manager of E.G.family and also become a photographer and graphic designer for other artists. With this announcement the previous pyramid structure of E-girls discontinued and the support members from Bunnies and Rabbits became students at EXPG Lab.

During the live event E-girls LIVE 2017 ～E.G.EVOLUTION～ at Saitama Super Arena on July 16, 2017, E.G.family was officially introduced as the new E-girls system. The title "E.G.EVOLUTION" was used to represent this change and the event included performances from all E.G.family members.

On December 31, 2017, Shuuka Fujii graduated from Flower and ShuuKaRen and retired from the entertainment industry due to worsening symptoms of the cervical spinal disc herniation she was diagnosed with in October of that year. It was also announced that with her departure, ShuuKaRen would end their activities as a unit as the group would only have Karen Fujii as remaining member. ShuuKaRen was removed from the E.G.family line-up on January 1, 2018.

On December 4, 2018 the group Dance Earth Party announced their indefinite hiatus. The members revealed that they would go on with their own activities. With the announcement, Dream Shizuka would start her solo career in E.G.family.

=== 2019-present: E.G.POWER 2019 ~POWER to the DOME~, Flower's and E-girls' disbandment ===
On December 4, 2018, E.G.family's first tour titled E.G.POWER 2019 ~POWER to the DOME~ was announced. The tour included all members of the E.G.family line-up, went from February 22 to May 25 and included 33 concerts in 26 cities nationwide.
On September 20, it was announced that Flower member Mio Nakajima is pregnant, would marry soccer player Cayman Togashi (FC Machida Zelvia) and thus would retire from the entertainment industry within the year. After talks between the Flower members and the staff of LDH in light of Mio's retirement, it was decided that the group would disband at the end of the same month. The other former Flower members would start their solo careers managed by LDH.

On December 22, 2019, E-girls announced that the E-girls PERFECT LIVE 2011▶2020 tour would be their final activity together and that the group will dissolve at the end of 2020. Every member will stay with their original company LDH and follow different career paths. While Harumi Sato, Nozomi Bando, Anna Ishii and Nonoka Yamaguchi will focus on their work as actresses and models, Yuzuna Takebe will form a new unit with the contestants that passed Afrojack's LDH Europe audition, Reina Washio will debut as a solo artist and Happiness will work with 88rising for global expansion.

On January 1, 2020, Dream Aya announced that she would be individually active independent from LDH starting that year. She will continue to work on photography and design, and produce fan club newsletters as before.

== Members ==
=== Current ===
- Happiness
- Dream Ami
- Dream Shizuka
- Rei
- Sweet Revenge

=== Former ===
- Dream
- ShuuKaRen
- Dance Earth Party
- Flower
- E-girls
- SudannaYuzuYully
- Dream Aya (chief creative manager)

== Discography ==
=== Video releases ===
Title	Details	Peak positions	Certifications
E.G.POWER 2019 ~POWER to the DOME~	Released: July 24, 2019; Label: Rhythm Zone; Formats: DVD / Blu-ray	2 / 8	
