= Arisa Sugi =

Japanese actress (born 1989)

- 杉 ありさ
- Born: January 6, 1989 (age 37); Tokyo, Japan
- Occupation: Actress
- Years active: 2008–
- Spouse: Yoshihiro Usami (m. 2017)
- Children: 1

Arisa Sugi (杉 ありさ, Sugi Arisa; born, January 6, 1989, in Tokyo, Japan) is a Japanese actress who is affiliated with LesPros Entertainment. She graduated from Senzoku Gakuen College of Music. She is married to dancer Yoshihiro Usami since 2017.

== Filmography ==
=== Films ===
Year	Title	Role	Other notes
2010	Hanamizuki		
