= Shunsuke Kiyokiba =

Japanese pop singer (born 1980)

Shunsuke Kiyokiba 清木場 俊介
- Born: January 11, 1980 (age 46); Ube, Yamaguchi, Japan
- Genres: J-pop, rock
- Occupations: Singer, songwriter
- Years active: 2001–present
- Labels: Rhythm Zone; Victor Entertainment
- Website: kiyokiba.net

Shunsuke Kiyokiba (清木場 俊介, Kiyokiba Shunsuke) (born January 11, 1980, in Ube, Yamaguchi) is a Japanese pop singer who debuted in 2001 with the then six-member vocal and dance group, Exile, as their vocalist under the name, Shun. In 2004, he participated in the tribute album for Yutaka Ozaki (尾崎豊) under his full name Shunsuke Kiyokiba as a solo artist. On January 19, 2005, his solo debut single "Itsuka..." (いつか…) was released. After four-and-a-half years with Exile, in March 2006, Kiyokiba announced his withdrawal from the group to focus on his solo career as a rock artist.

In July 2011, he recorded the duet "I Believe" with South Korean singer Shin Hye-sung of Shinhwa.

== Biography ==
=== Background ===
According to his official website, Kiyokiba has played in a band since he was in middle school. Even after the band broke up when he was 18, he still played the guitar in the tunnels in his hometown, alongside others who shared the same interest. By the age of 20, he has worked in the construction business, and has managed a team of teen workers in the field. Then, he participated in a vocal audition organized by a local television station and won. Later, he was signed by the record company, and was brought to Tokyo as one of EXILE's vocalists.

=== Music career highlights ===
- September 27, 2001 – debuted as EXILE's vocalist, SHUN
- March 24, 2004 – took part in Yutaka Ozaki's tribute album, officially beginning his solo career as Shunsuke Kiyokiba
- January 19, 2005 – released solo debut single "Itsuka...".
- October 19, 2005 – released solo debut album under solo name "Kiyokiba Shunsuke".
- March 27, 2006 – announced withdrawal from EXILE, effective March 29, 2006
- October 21 – December 11, 2006 – performed first nationwide solo live tour
- March 28, 2007 – released nationwide live tour DVD
- September 17, 2008 – announced leave from LDH and Avex Record Label
- January 11, 2009 – announced on his birthday and last Tour day of Rock&SoulII that he's now signed with Victor Entertainment's Speedstar Records.
- March 18, 2009 – released his last album "SONGS 2005–2008" with Avex Rhythm Zone.
- July 8, 2009 – released first album "Rockin' the Door" with Victor Entertainment's Speedstar Records.
- September 2, 2009 – released first single "JET" with Victor Entertainment's Speedstar Records.
- September 30, 2009 – released second album "FLYING JET" with Victor Entertainment's Speedstar Records.
- May 5, 2010 – released his live DVD: "Otoko Matsuri 2009 Uijin −2009.11.20 Akasaka Blitz-"
- September 29, 2010 – released second single "Mahou no Kotoba" with Victor Entertainment's Speedstar Records.
- October 27, 2010 – released third single "Yale" with Victor Entertainment's Speedstar Records. And he released his mini album in rental edition "Ballad Selection"
- November 24, 2010 – release third album "ROCK & SOUL" with Victor Entertainment's Speedstar Records.
- May 25, 2011 – released his live video "Documentary Music Video Ube Sanbusaku Kanzen Ban"
- June 29, 2011 – released live album "ROCK & SOUL 2010–2011 LIVE"
- July 27, 2011 – released his live video "Nippon Budokan −2011.4.24 ROCK & SOUL 2010–2011 TOUR FINAL-"
- November 23, 2011 – released first cover single "Sakura Iro Mau koro / Melody" with Victor Entertainment's Speedstar Records.
- December 7, 2011 – released his fourth album "LOVE SONGS ~BALLAD SELECTION~". Also released his 2nd live album "ROLLING MY WAY −2011.9.30 at Zepp Sendai-" under Victor Entertainment's Speedstar Records.
- August 29, 2012 – released fourth single "Fighting Man" with Victor Entertainment's Speedstar Records.
- November 28, 2012 – released fifth single "again" with Victor Entertainment's Speedstar Records.
- February 6, 2013 – released fifth album "FIGHTING MEN" with Victor Entertainment's Speedstar Records.
- November 2, 2013 – released his limited edition single "Honey"
- December 17, 2013 – released his live album DVD "ROCK&SOUL 2013 "FIGHTING MEN" TOUR FINAL 2013.7.13 at Osakajo Hall.
- May 21, 2014 – released sixth single "Shiawase na Hibi wo Kimi to" with Victor Entertainment's Speedstar Records.
- July 23, 2014 – released seventh single "Rock Star" with Victor Entertainment's Speedstar Records.
- September 10, 2014 – released sixth album "MY SOUNDS" with Victor Entertainment's Speedstar Records.
- June 24, 2015 – released eighth single "Kiseki" with Victor Entertainment's Speedstar Records.
- August 19, 2015 – released ninth single "Kagerou" with Victor Entertainment's Speedstar Records.
- February 8, 2017 – released tenth single "Tomo e" with Victor Entertainment's Speedstar Records.
- March 29, 2017 – released seventh album "REBORN" with Victor Entertainment's Speedstar Records.

=== Other highlights ===
- May 14 – June 19, 2004, and September 17 – December 5, 2005 – held two solo exhibitions of poetry, calligraphy, and photography, in Fukuoka, Osaka, Tokyo, and Sapporo, drawing 32000 attendees.
- February 10, 2007 – debuted as an actor in the motion picture, Tengoku wa mattekureru (天国は待ってくれる), alongside Yoshihiko Inohara (井ノ原快彦) from V6 and Aya Okamoto (岡本綾). It has reached No. 9 on Japan's box-office ranking during its first week of release.

== Special terminologies ==
=== Eno hundert elf ===
In spring 2007, Kiyokiba has begun his new brand of clothing line under this name, which came from the number "111" in German. This number is linked to his birthday, January 11, which can sometimes be abbreviated as "0111" or "111".

=== Kiyokibasstars ===
On April 26, 2006, Kiyokiba launched KIYOKIBASSTARS, his official bass fishing website, promoting his hobby of topwater style fishing. There are four official members in his Kiyokibasstars fishing group. His fishing trips to Lake El Salto in Mexico and Lake Castaic in California have been filmed and officially released into DVDs.

=== Utaiya ===
Kiyokiba often referred to himself as "utaiya" (唄い屋). It is a label found on the back of his CDs and in video footage of his DVDs. In February 2007, the website UTAIYA.COM was launched, which stated:

UTAIYA is the persons who sing a song with all our heart and soul.

It is a website which promotes the new artists, Raine Kawane (川根来音) and Shouta Nishihiro (西広しょうた).

== Discography ==
=== Singles ===
	Title (Japanese)	Title (Romanized)	Release date	Sales	Catalog No.
1	いつか…	Itsuka...	January 19, 2005		CD+DVD: RZCD-45170/B; CD: RZCD-45171
2	さよなら愛しい人よ…	Sayonara itoshii hito yo...	August 3, 2005		CD+DVD: RZCD-45261/B, 45262/B; CD: RZCD-45263/45264
3	人間じゃろうが！／さよならの唄…。	Ningen jarou ga!/Sayonara no uta....	March 29, 2006		CD+DVD: RZCD-45383/B; CD: RZCD-45384
4	believe／僕の毎日	believe/Boku no mainichi	August 2, 2006		CD+DVD: RZCD-45420/B; CD: RZCD-45421
5	天国は待ってくれる	Tengoku wa mattekureru	February 7, 2007		CD+DVD: RZCD-45513/B; CD: RZCD-45514
6	五日間……バックレよう	Itsukakan......Bakkure you	July 18, 2007		CD: RZCD-45602
7	最後の夜	Saigo no Yoru	July 18, 2007		CD: RZCD-45603
8	–	SAKURA	December 12, 2007		CD+DVD: RZCD-45792/B; CD: RZCD-45793
9	愛のかたち	Ai no Katachi	February 6, 2008		CD+DVD: RZCD-45816/B; CD: RZCD-45817
10	今。	Ima.	April 23, 2008		CD+DVD: RZCD-45900/B; CD: RZCD-45901
11	–	JET	September 2, 2009		Limited Ed CD: VICL36531; Regular Ed CD: VICL36532
12	魔法の言葉	Mahou No Kotoba	September 29, 2010		CD: VICL36609
13	エール	Yell	October 27, 2010		CD: VICL36617
14	桜色舞うころ／メロディー	Sakura Iro Mau koro / Melody	November 23, 2011		CD: VICL36673
15	–	Fighting Man	August 29, 2012		Limited Ed CD: VICL36173; Regular Ed CD: VICL36174
16	–	again	November 28, 2012		Limited Ed CD: VICL36742; Regular Ed CD: VICL36743
17	幸せな日々を君と	Shiawase na Hibi wo Kimi to	May 21, 2014		CD: VICL36908
18	ROCK★STAR	Rock Star	July 23, 2014		CD: VICL36941
19	軌跡	Kiseki	June 24, 2015		CD: VICL37058
20	蜉蝣 ～カゲロウ	Kagerou: Kagerou	August 19, 2015		CD: VICL37099
21	友へ	Tomo e	February 8, 2017	9,216	CD:VICL37244

=== Albums ===
	Title (Japanese)	Title (Romanized)	Release date	Sales	Catalog No.
1	清木場俊介	Kiyokiba Shunsuke	October 19, 2005		CD+DVD: RZCD-45285/B; CD: RZCD-45286
1 (live)	清木場俊介 LIVE "祭"	Kiyokiba Shunsuke LIVE "matsuri"	December 20, 2006		CD: RZCD-45494
2	–	IMAGE	September 5, 2007		CD+DVD: RZCD-45648/B; CD: RZCD-45649
2 (live)	清木場祭2007	Kiyokibamatsuri2007	April 23, 2008		CD: RZCD-45898
3	清木場俊介SONGS 2005–2008	Kiyokiba Shunsuke SONGS 2005–2008	March 18, 2009		CD+DVD: RZCD46161/B; CD: RZCD46162
4	–	Rockin' the Door	July 8, 2009		CD+DVD: VIZL335; CD: VICL63342
5	–	FLYING JET	September 30, 2009		CD+DVD: VIZL350; CD: VICL63390
6	–	ROCK & SOUL	November 24, 2010		CD+DVD: VIZL369; CD: VICL63696
3 (live)	–	ROCK & SOUL 2010–2011 LIVE	June 29, 2011		CD: VICL63750
7	LOVE SONGS 〜BALLAD SELECTION〜	LOVE SONGS: BALLAD SELECTION	December 7, 2011		CD+DVD: VIZL446; CD: VICL63808
4 (live)	ROLLING MY WAY −September 30, 2011, at Zepp Sendai-	ROLLING MY WAY -September 9, 2011, at Zepp Sendai-	December 7, 2011		CD: VICL63835
8	–	FIGHTING MEN	February 6, 2013		CD+DVD: VIZL515; CD: VICL63988
5 (live)	ROCK&SOUL 2013 "FIGHTING MEN" TOUR FINAL 2013.7.13 at大阪城ホール	ROCK&SOUL 2013 "FIGHTING MEN" TOUR FINAL 2013.7.13 at Osaka-Jo Hall	December 17, 2013		CD: NCS876
9	唄い屋・BEST Vol.1	Utaiya Best Vol.1	March 5, 2014		CD+DVD: VIZL599; CD: VICL64078
10	–	MY SOUNDS	September 10, 2014		CD+DVD VIZL706; CD: VICL64202
11	–	FACT	September 16, 2015		CD+DVD VIZL874; CD: VICL64414
12	–	REBORN	March 29, 2017	11,690	CD+DVD VIZL1135; CD: VICL64763

=== DVD ===
	Title (Japanese)	Title (Romanized)	Release date	Catalog No.
1	清木場俊介 LIVE TOUR 2006 それ行け！ オッサン少年の旅	Kiyokiba Shunsuke LIVE TOUR 2006 sore yuke! ossan shonen no tabi	March 28, 2007	RZBD-45535/B
2	清木場俊介 VIDEO CLIPS	Kiyokiba Shunsuke VIDEO CLIPS	February 6, 2008	RZBD-45815
3	清木場俊介 LIVE TOUR 2007 "まだまだ! オッサン少年の旅" OSSAN BOY'S TOUR BACK AGAIN	Kiyokiba Shunsuke LIVE TOUR 2007 "Madamada! Ossan Shonen no Tabi" OSSAN BOY'S TOUR BACK AGAIN	March 5, 2008	RZBD-45840
4	清木場俊介 Live Tour 2008 Rock & Soul日本武道館	Kiyokiba Shunsuke LIVE TOUR 2008 Rock & Soul Nippon Budoukan	August 27, 2008	RZBD-45991
5	清木場俊介 Live Tour 2008–2009 Rock & Soul II	Kiyokiba Shunsuke LIVE TOUR 2008–2009 Rock & Soul II	March 18, 2009	VIBL578
6	−November 29, 2009 赤坂BLITZ-	Otoko Matsuri 2009 Uijin −2009.11.20 Akasaka Blitz-	May 5, 2010	VIBL-655
7	−January 31, 2010 FLYING JET TOUR 2009～2010 TOUR FINAL-	Nippon Budokan −2010.1.31 FLYING JET TOUR 2009–2010 Tour Final-	June 9, 2010	VIBL-669
*	–	KIYOKIBASSTARS	November 24, 2010	BMD-0143
8	ドキュメンタリー・ミュージックビデオ 宇部三部作 完全版	Documentary Music Video Ube Sanbusaku Kanzen Ban	June 25, 2011	VIBL-609
9	日本武道館 -April 24, 2011, ROCK & SOUL 2010–2011 TOUR FINAL-	Nippon Budokan −2011.4.24 ROCK & SOUL 2010–2011 TOUR FINAL-	July 27, 2011	VIBL-610
10	男祭 2011	Otoko Matsuri 2011	March 14, 2012	VIBL-627
11	–	CHRISTMAS CONCERT 2011 LOVE SONGS FOR WOMEN	March 14, 2012	VIBL-631
*	–	Walkin' with Fate KIYOKIBA SHUNSUKE	*	*
12	–	CHRISTMAS CONCERT 2012 "WHITE ROCK"	March 27, 2013	VIBL-672
13	ROCK&SOUL 2013 "FIGHTING MEN" TOUR FINAL 2013.7.13 at大阪城ホール	ROCK&SOUL 2013 "FIGHTING MEN" TOUR FINAL 2013.7.13 at Osaka-Jo Hall	December 17, 2013	NBS-715
14	–	10th Anniversary Acoustic Live "MY SOUNDS" 2014.5.6 at TOKYO DOME CITY HALL	September 10, 2014	VIBL-717
15	ROCK&SOUL 2014 "MY SOUNDS" TOUR FINAL 2014.12.14 at 東京国際フォーラム ホールA	ROCK&SOUL 2014 "MY SOUNDS" TOUR FINAL 2014.12.14 at Tokyo International Forum Hall A	March 18, 2015	VIBL-745
16	男祭2015 "CRAZY JET" 2015.5.5 at TSUTAYA O-EAST	Otokomatsuri 2015 "Crazy Jet" 2015.5.5 at Tsutaya O-East	September 16, 2015	VIBL-774
17	ROCK&SOUL 2015 "FACT" 2015.12.13 at 東京国際フォーラム ホールA	ROCK&SOUL 2015 "FACT" 2015.12.13 at Tokyo International Forum Hall A	March 16, 2016	VIBL-802
18	–	LIVE HOUSE TOUR「RUSH」 2016.9.24 at YOKOHAMA Bay Hall	February 8, 2017	VIBL-829
19	–	CHRISTMAS CONCERT 2016 「WHITE ROCK III」	March 29, 2017	VIBL-839
20	–	LIVE HOUSE TOUR 2017 "ONE ROAD" at Zepp DiverCity	March 5, 2018	VIBL-758
21	男祭2017 "LIVE OR DIE" at KAWASAKI CLUB CITTA	Otoko-matsuri 2017 "Live or Die" at Kawasaki Club Citta	March 5, 2018	VIBL-756

=== Other releases ===
	Song title in Japanese (Romanized)	From single or album	Release date	Catalog No.
1	ふたつの心 (Futatsu no kokoro)	GREEN ～A TRIBUTE TO YUTAKA OZAKI (various artists)	March 24, 2004	CD: SECL-68
2	ありがとう (Arigatou)	real world / ありがとう (EXILE vs Kiyokiba Shunsuke)	June 30, 2004	CD: RZCD-45135
3	例えば…ボクが。 (Tatoeba... boku ga.)	HEART of GOLD 〜STREET FUTURE OPERA BEAT POPS〜 (EXILES)	September 29, 2004	CD: RZCD-45144
