= Tachikawa Sumito =

Japanese singer and host (1929–1985)

- 立川清登
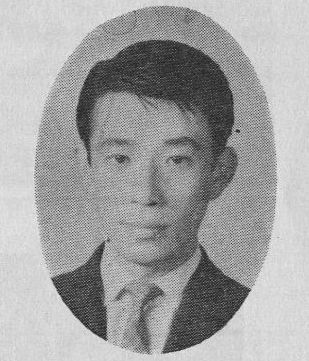
- Tachikawa in 1958
- Born: 立川澄人; Tachikawa Sumito; February 15, 1929; Ōita, Ōita Prefecture, Empire of Japan
- Died: December 31, 1985 (aged 56)
- Education: Kunitachi College of Music; Tokyo University of the Arts
- Occupations: Singer; radio host; teacher
- Years active: 1953–1985
- Employers: NHK; Nippon Broadcasting System; Senzoku Gakuen
- Known for: Minna no uta; Ongaku o dōzo; Sekai no ongaku

Tachikawa Sumito (立川清登; February 15, 1929 – December 31, 1985) was a Japanese baritone singer and radio host. At first a singer of opera and lieder, his repertoire later included musicals and popular music. In addition to being a performing musician, he was also a radio host and television personality.

== Biography ==
=== Early life and education ===
Tachikawa was born on February 15, 1929, in Ōita, Ōita Prefecture. His interest in singing began when his elementary school's music teacher praised his talent. Consequently, Tachikawa later enrolled at the Ōita Normal School in order to become a music teacher. Although he taught music at a junior high school after graduation, he maintained his ambition to become a professional singer. After being advised by a colleague to pursue music full-time, Tachikawa resigned his job and enrolled in music studies at Beppu Prefectural High School No. 2. He moved to Tokyo after graduation and transferred to the Kunitachi College of Music, where he became a student of Nakayama Teiichi. The following year, Tachikawa was admitted into Tokyo University of the Arts and studied under Margarete Julia Netke-Löwe; he graduated with degrees in vocal music and performance in 1954 and 1955 respectively.

=== Professional career ===
Tachikawa was one of the founding members of Nikikai, a volunteer organization for singers, in 1952. The following year, Tachikawa sang in his first operatic performance as a chorus member for his school's performance of La bohème. That same year, he made his professional debut as Germont in a production of La traviata at the Asahi Kaikan in Osaka. In 1955, he was signed onto Nippon Victor, for whom he was an exclusive artist for the rest of his life. His repertoire quickly expanded, with his interpretations of Papageno in The Magic Flute, Le Dancaïre in Carmen, and Figaro in The Barber of Seville earning him exceptional praise; the latter role won him the 1958 Mainichi Music Prize.

In 1962, Tachikawa began to sing lieder in recital. He also began to expand his career into musicals. His performance as the King of Siam in The King and I earned him a Theatron Award in 1965. That same year, he was chosen to be one of the soloists for the Japanese premiere of Benjamin Britten's War Requiem played by the Yomiuri Nippon Symphony Orchestra.

=== Broadcasting career ===
In addition to singing, Tachikawa also had a successful career as host for radio and television programs. In January 1960, he became the host for NHK's Ongaku o dōzo (lit. 'Music, If You Please'). Later, between 1968 and 1974, he was the main host of Sekai no ongaku (lit. 'Music of the World'); he later worked on this program with Sagara Naomi.

His recording of "My Grandfather's Clock" became an enduring source of fame for Tachikawa and established the song as a classic of Japanese popular culture when it was broadcast on the NHK children's program, Minna no uta. It first aired on June and July 1962, accompanied by an animated sequence created by Taniuchi Rokurō. The song quickly became well known across Japan and has been incorporated into educational settings ever since. A second version, utilizing the same recording, but with a new animated sequence by Takeguchi Yoshiyuki was broadcast on Minna no uta in 1972. Tachikawa appeared four times in the Kōhaku Uta Gassen.

=== Later life ===
Tachikawa's LPs were popular in the 1960s and 1970s. He had a major hit in 1976 with his cover of "Shiki no uta" (lit. 'Song of the Four Seasons'). He discovered the song during his tenure as host of the Nippon Broadcasting System radio show, Aozora Wide. A housewife called into the show with a request to hear the "Shiki no uta". Unfamiliar with the song, he asked her to sing it for him over the air, and was impressed by its melody.

Music education remained an interest for Tachigawa, who held the position of visiting professor at Senzoku Gakuen. In 1985, Tachikawa sung the "Kimi ga yo" at Madison Square Garden. He sang in performances in the early part of that year that were part of a Japanese anti-nuclear campaign. That summer, he embarked on a tour of Europe, which included a performance in the Vatican City and an audience with Pope John Paul II. Late in the year, he appeared in a new production of The Merry Widow and began preparing for what would have been his debut as an opera director.

=== Death and legacy ===
On December 10, 1985, Tachikawa collapsed from a stroke during a performance at a hotel in Yonago, Tottori Prefecture. Emergency surgery led to a brief recovery, but his condition soon worsened and he died on December 31. In reminiscences for a 2012 memorial 5-CD collection of his recordings, Sagara eulogized her former colleague:

Allow me to say this: there is nobody in the world of [Japanese] classical music who is as big a star as Mr. Tachikawa was. We lost a truly, truly incredible person. I do not think there will ever be another to surpass him. I cannot help but feel that if we do not start from scratch and create the soil in which natural talent can be utilized, then the music world as a whole will cease to create anything genuine.
