= Senzoku Gakuen =

Private educational institution in Kanagawa, Japan

Coordinates: 35°35′38″N 139°36′56″E

Senzoku Gakuen College of Music and Senzoku Gakuen Junior College
- 洗足学園音楽大学 Senzoku gakuen ongaku daigaku 洗足こども短期大学 Senzoku kodomo tanki daigaku
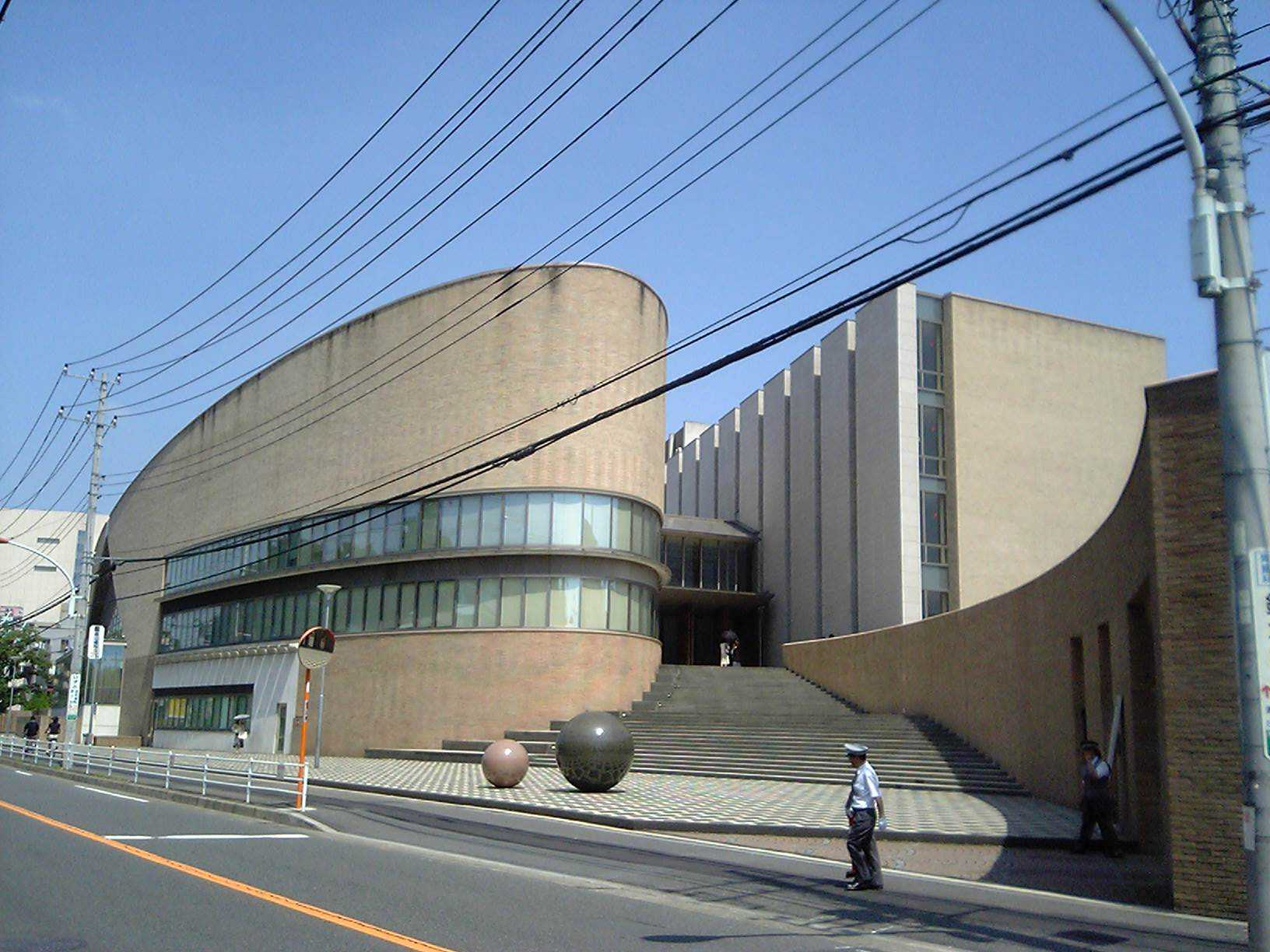
- The main gate of Senzoku Gakuen College of Music
- Motto: Keep your dreams lofty, but be humble in your actions
- Type: Private
- Established: 1924
- Location: Takatsu-ku, Kawasaki, Kanagawa, Japan
- Website: Official website

Senzoku Gakuen (洗足学園, Senzoku gakuen) is a private educational institution in Kawasaki, Kanagawa, Japan. The institution operates a school of music, a junior college, primary and secondary schools, and a kindergarten.

The first Senzoku Gakuen school, the Hiratsuka Sewing School for Women, was founded in 1924 by Wakao Maeda, followed by the opening of Senzoku Women's Higher School in 1927. Senzoku Gakuen Women's Junior High School was established in 1947, followed by a kindergarten in 1948 and an elementary school in 1949.

== College of Music ==
Senzoku Gakuen College of Music (洗足学園音楽大学, Senzoku gakuen ongaku daigaku) is located in Takatsu-ku, Kawasaki, Kanagawa. It was established in 1967; the present name was adopted in 2003. A Department of Music was established in 1962 under Senzoku Gakuen Junior College, which became the Senzoku Gakuen College of Music in 2003. The school offers both undergraduate and graduate programs.

== Junior college ==
Senzoku Junior College of Childhood Education (洗足こども短期大学, Senzoku kodomo tanki daigaku), formerly Senzoku Gakuen Junior College (洗足学園短期大学, Senzoku gakuen tanki daigaku) shares the Takatsu-ku campus with Senzoku Gakuen College of Music. The two-year program offers courses in music and early childhood education.

Senzoku Gakuen Uozu Junior College (洗足学園魚津短期大学, Senzoku Gakuen Uozu Tanki Daigaku) was another junior college in Uozu, Toyama, Japan. The junior college was established in April 1980 by Senzoku Gakuen Group. Enrollment of new students ended in 2000 and the college closed in 2002. It offered courses in literature and music.

== Notable alumni ==
- Takanori Arisawa – Composer and arranger
- Ayaka Hirahara (Faculty of Jazz) – Pop singer
- Kanon Shizaki (Faculty of Rock and Pop) – Voice actress and keyboardist
- Arisa Sugi – Actress
- Yutaka Yamada (Faculty of Acoustic Design) – Composer
- Laur – Composer

== Notable faculty ==
- Tachikawa Sumito (visiting professor)
