= Jero =

American singer (born 1981)

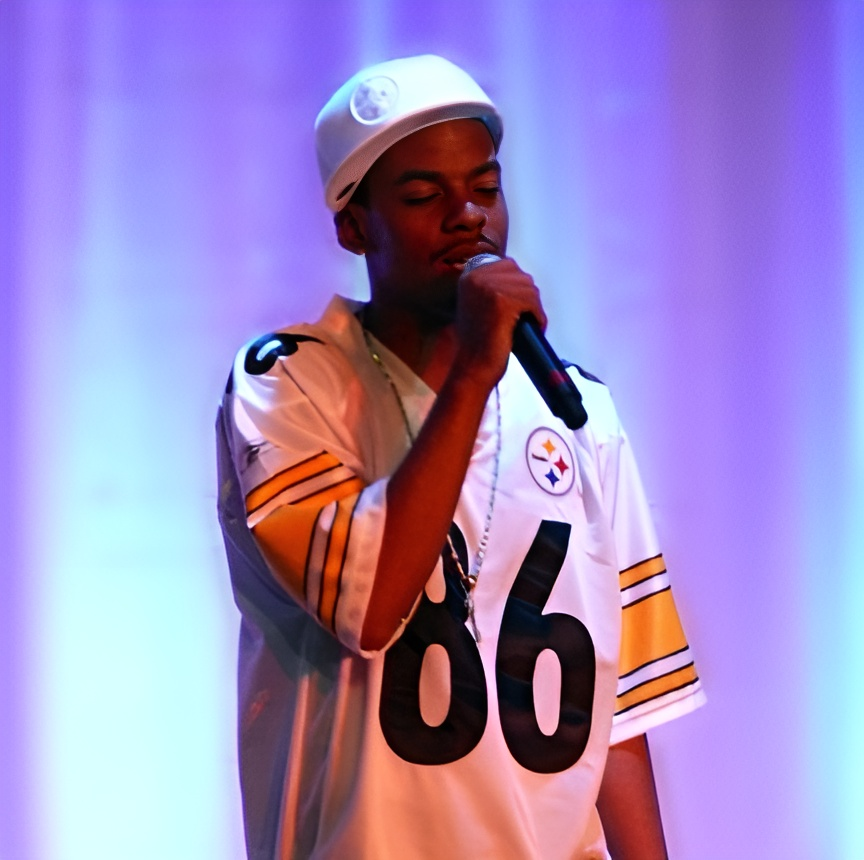
- Jero performing in 2008

Background information
- Born: Jerome Charles White Jr. September 4, 1981 (age 44); Pittsburgh, Pennsylvania, U.S.
- Genres: Enka
- Occupations: Singer, computer engineer
- Years active: 2007–2018
- Label: Victor Entertainment
- Website: www.jvcmusic.co.jp/jero/

Jerome Charles White Jr. (born September 4, 1981), better known by his stage name Jero (ジェロ), is an American enka singer of African-American and Japanese descent who is the first black enka singer in Japanese music history. In 2018, Jero announced that he was taking an indefinite hiatus from his music career to focus on a career in computers.

== Biography ==
Jero began singing enka at the age of six and continued to study the Japanese language all throughout high school and college. He also studied Japanese for some time at the Kansai Gaidai University school of foreign languages. Jero majored in information science at University of Pittsburgh and graduated in 2003 and moved to Japan in the same year. Two months after arriving in Japan, he entered the NHK Nodo Jiman competition broadcast on TV.

Jero first began pursuing his dream to become an enka artist because of the influence of his Japanese grandmother Takiko, who had met his grandfather, an African-American serviceman, at a dance during World War II. They married, had a daughter, Harumi - now a department store sales clerk - and eventually moved to his grandfather's hometown, Pittsburgh. His parents divorced when he was young and he was reared amid a strong sense of Japanese culture.

His grandmother, originally from Yokohama, Japan, first introduced Jero to enka and it was under her guidance that he grew to love the genre as a child. Jero, who majored in information technology at the University of Pittsburgh, did not initially imagine himself in a career as an enka singer. Rather, after he permanently moved to Japan, his main forms of employment were as an English teacher at NOVA and as a computer engineer. He only began to actively work towards becoming an enka singer because he had promised his grandmother that one day he would someday perform at the annual Kohaku Uta Gassen song show. As a result, he actively participated in numerous singing contests while he continued to work as a computer engineer and eventually achieved real success after only two months since he had arrived in Japan. His grandmother never was able to see her grandson achieve enka fame, as she died in 2005, three years before he became famous.

His first single, Umiyuki (海雪; literally, Ocean Snow), was released in Japan on February 20, 2008. It entered the Oricon charts at number 4. Umiyuki references the Sea of Japan, but Jero has admitted that the only ocean he has ever really seen was in California.

From May 21, 2008, Jero appeared in a Japanese TV commercial for Kirin "Fire" coffee, the first time he had appeared in a TV commercial. In October 2008, he was interviewed on CNN International's TalkAsia.

He won Best New Artist Award in 50th Japan Record Awards on December 30, 2008.

Jero was selected to appear on the 59th NHK Kōhaku Uta Gassen, NHK New Year's Eve musical spectacular, on December 31, 2008. In his participation, he fulfilled a pledge he made to his dying grandmother to appear on the yearly competition. Jero appeared wearing a black and white shirt bearing the image of his grandmother. He also appeared on the following year's show.

Jero made his first major U.S. appearance on March 28, 2009 during the opening ceremony of the National Cherry Blossom Festival in Washington, D.C. Jero's first official U.S. appearance was a live concert to over 500 fans at the University of Pittsburgh, his alma mater, on August 27, 2008.

Jero completed his first official US concert tour by singing to a sold-out house at the Palace of Fine Arts in San Francisco on March 28, 2010 and at the Aratani Japan America Theatre in Los Angeles on March 31, 2010. In addition, he also appeared in the 30th Anniversary Gala Celebration of the Japanese American Cultural and Community Center in Los Angeles on March 30, 2010.

== Appeal ==
African-American culture has been popular among a segment of young Japanese since the mid-1990s, so many are hoping that he will be able to spark interest in enka in the younger generation. He held a concert on February 20, 2008 in Shibuya, a popular hangout for young people.

From the start, Jero always wanted to keep his hip hop attire, but his record company was a bit hesitant at first. Most enka singers wear a kimono in their performances, which Jero felt was inappropriate for him. After pleading with his management company, he was allowed to maintain the hip hop image and to great success as it is one of the many factors that contribute to his popularity.

== Discography ==
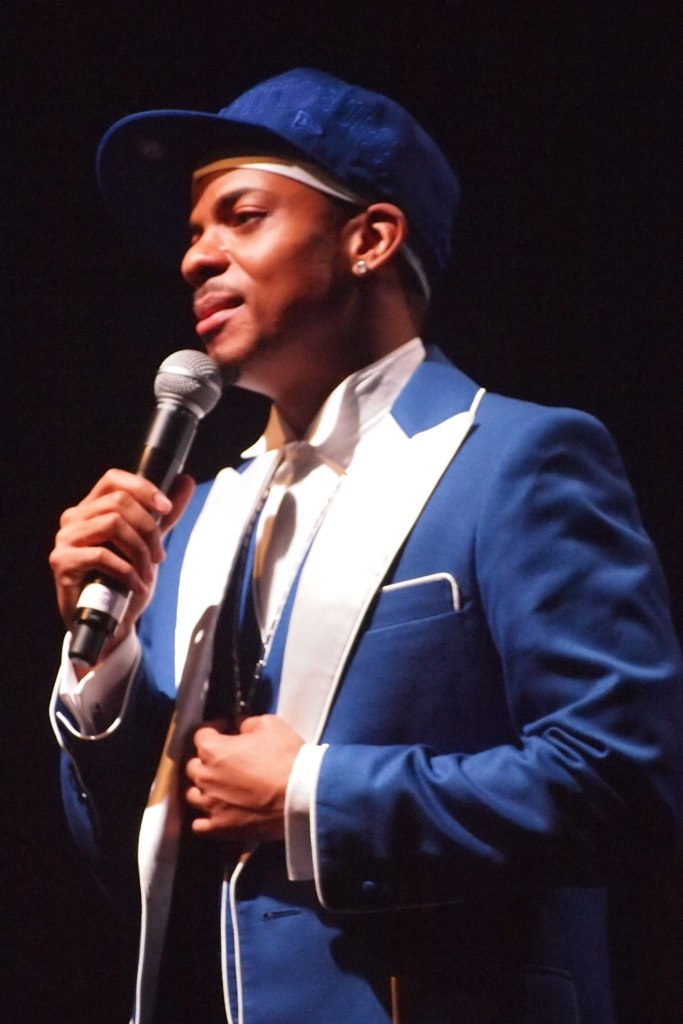
Jero at a concert by Japan Society in New York, on June 8, 2012

=== Singles ===
- "Umiyuki" (海雪) (2008.02.20)
- "Eisa" (えいさ) (2009.01.28)
- "Yancha michi" (やんちゃ道) (2009.04.15)
- "Tsumeato" (爪跡) (2009.08.19)
- "Usonaki" (嘘泣き) (2010.06.16)
1. Usonaki [嘘泣き]
2. Otokonaki [男泣き]
3. Shiki no uta [四季の歌]
- "Tada...Namida" (ただ...涙) (2011.06.22)
1. Tada...Namida [ただ...涙]
2. Kaenjyu [火焔樹]

=== Digital Songs ===
- "Mezamashi yume ondo" (めざまし夢音頭) (2008.08.13)
- "Shiren" (試練) (2008.12.03)
- "Wakeari ressha" (訳あり列車) (2011.03.30)

=== Albums ===
- Covers (カバーズ) (2008.06.25)
1. Hisame [氷雨]
2. Kimi koishi [君恋し]
3. Yozura [夜空]
4. Mizukigami [水鏡]
5. Honmoku meruhen [本牧メルヘン]
6. Pusanko e kaere [釜山港へ帰れ]
7. Saraba koibito [さらば恋人]
- Covers (カバーズ) Special Edition (CD + DVD) (2008.06.25)
- Yakusoku (約束) (2009.02.25)
1. Eisa [えいさ]
2. Tokyo hyouryuu [東京漂流]
3. Aruzenchin touhikou [アルゼンチン逃避行]
4. Shiren [試練]
5. Hare butai [晴れ舞台]
6. Kyoko to takashi [キョーコとタカシ]
7. Rurou no machi [流浪の街]
8. Osaka jewel [大阪ジュエル]
9. Nanohana hatake de tsukamae te [菜の花畑でつかまえて]
10. Umiyuki [海雪]
- Covers 2 (カバーズ 2) (2009.09.23)
1. Matteiru onna [待っている女]
2. Shishuuki [思秋期]
3. Aijin [愛人]
4. Orizuru [折鶴]
5. Rashoumon [羅生門]
6. Tasogare [黄昏]
7. Yukiguni [雪國]
8. Hajimeteno machide [初めての街で]
- Covers 3 - Roots of Jero (カバーズ 3) (2010.06.16)
1. Echigojishi no uta [越後獅子の唄]
2. Tsugaru heiya [津軽平野]
3. Amerika bashi [アメリカ橋]
4. Chigiri [契り]
5. Yozakura oshichi [夜桜お七]
6. Tsugaru koionna [津軽恋女]
7. J
- Best and Rare (ベスト&レア) (2011.03.30)
1. Umiyuki [海雪]
2. Hisame [氷雨]
3. Hare butai [晴れ舞台]
4. Yurakuchode arimasho [有楽町で逢いましょう]
5. Tsuemato [爪跡]
6. Shiki no uta [四季の歌]
7. Shiren [試練]
8. Usonaki [嘘泣き]
9. Rurou no machi [流浪の街]
10. Hajimeteno machide [初めての街で]
11. Eisa [えいさ]
12. Mezamashi yume ondo [めざまし夢音頭]
13. Yancha michi [やんちゃ道]
14. Wakeari ressha [訳あり列車]
15. Taitoru mitei [タイトル未定]
- Covers 4 (カバーズ 4) (2011.06.22)
1. Soshite Kobe [そして神戸]
2. Mado [窓]
3. Tasogaremai・rabu [たそがれマイ・ラブ]
4. Nora [ノラ]
5. Soemoncho blues [宗右衛門町ブルース]
6. Itoshiki hibi [愛しき日々]
7. Katteni shiyagare [勝手にしやがれ]
8. Sakurazaka [桜坂]

== Movies ==
- Donju as Akira. (2009)

== Commercial tie-ins ==
- Hisame for Kirin Fire Cafe Zero (2008)
- Shiren for Fushigi no Dungeon Furai no Shiren DS2-Sabaku no Majō (2008)
- Hare Butai for Minna no Uta (2008)
- Rurō no Machi for Donju (2009)
- Yancha Michi for Crayon Shin-chan: Otakebe! Kasukabe Yasei Ōkoku (2009)
- Kyoko to Takashi for Hokkaidō Railway Company (2009)
- Shiki no uta for Toyo Suisan (2010)

Preceded by Cute	Japan Record Award for Best New Artist; 2008	Succeeded by BIGBANG
