= Zoo (Japanese band) =

J-pop band

- Origin: Japan
- Genres: J-pop
- Years active: 1989–1995
- Past members: TACO; SATSUKI; SAE; HIRO; CAP; LUKE; MARK

Zoo (stylized as ZOO) was a J-pop dance and vocal group formed in 1989. They debuted with the single "Careless Dance" on 5 May 1990. ZOO had one major hit with the 1991 song "Choo Choo Train" and disbanded in 1995. In 1993, the British dance music duo Band of Gypsies and singer Miriam Stockley released an album of ZOO covers, titled Song of ZOO Meets House Style. In 1999, a former member, Hiroyuki Igarashi, formed the group J Soul Brothers, which was renamed Exile in 2001. They rerecorded the song "Choo Choo Train" in 2003, and it went on to be one of their biggest hits.

== Band members ==
Final lineup

- TACO (Chiaki Nojima) – bandleader, dancer
- SATSUKI (Satsuki Miki) – lead singer
- SAE (Saeko Ebisawa) – dancer
- HIRO (Hiroyuki Igarashi) – dancer
- CAP (Sakai Toshihiro) – dancer
- LUKE (Saito Norifumi) – dancer
- MARK (Sumihisa Okayama) – dancer

Other members

- HISAMI (Kumi Takemura)
- NAOYA (Naoya Setani)
- MAMI (Mami Murao)
- YU-KI (Yuuki Kitamura): singer; current lead vocalist for TRF
- HISAMI (Hisami Takemura)

== Discography ==
Albums

- Native (1991)
- Present Pleasure (1991)
- Gorgeous (1992)
- Jungle (1992)
- Can I Dance? (1993)
- ZOO Palast (1994)

EPs

- Choo Choo Train (1991)

Compilations

- ZOO for Sale (1993)
- ZOO Last Dance (1995)
- ZOO Pure Best (2001)
- ZOO Golden Best: Special Works (2003)
- Real ZOO Best – DJ Taro Selection (2013)

Remix albums

- ZOO Remix (1995)
- Dance Paradise Hyper Euro ZOO (2000)

Live albums

- ZOO the Final ~Last Dance Live~ (1996)

Singles

- "Careless Dance" (1990)
- "Given" (1991)
- "Native" (1991)
- "Choo Choo Train" (1991)
- "Gorgeous" (1992)
- "Ya-Ya-Ya" (1992)
- "Shy-Shy-Shine" (1993)
- "Ding Dong Express" (1993)
- "On Time" (1994)
- "Angelic Dream" (1994)
- "Adam" (1995)
