= Mai Fukui =

Japanese singer-songwriter (born 1984)

- Born: December 17, 1984 (age 41); Kamigyō-ku, Kyoto, Japan
- Genres: J-Pop
- Occupation: Singer-songwriter
- Years active: 2008–present
- Label: J-More
- Website: www.fukuimai.net/index.html

Mai Fukui (福井舞, Fukui Mai; born December 17, 1984) is a Japanese singer-songwriter, signed on Avex Group's J-More label.

She is known for singing the theme song for the video game Final Fantasy XIII-2, Yakusoku no Basho. She was nominated for Best New Artist at the 50th Japan Record Awards.

== Discography ==
=== Albums ===
- My Song for You (2009)
- Lucky Charm (2010)

=== Mini-Albums ===
- Beautiful Days (2011)
- Another me (2014) (with Aimer)

=== Singles ===
- Ai no Uta (2008)
- Lucky (2008)
- Can Can/Promise You (2009)
- Ikutabi No Sakura (2011)
- Yakusoku No Basho/Tatta Hitori No Mikata (2011)
