= Tokkō Jimuin Minowa =

Japanese manga series

- First tankōbon volume cover

特攻事務員ミノワ
- Genre: Legal comedy
- Manga
- Written by: Kei Ogawa
- Published by: Kodansha
- Magazine: Weekly Young Magazine
- Original run: July 1, 2013 – October 21, 2013
- Volumes: 2
- Television drama

Binta! Bengoshi Jimuin Minowa ga Ai de Kaiketsushimasu
- Studio: K-Factory
- Original network: NNS (YTV, NTV)
- Original run: October 2, 2014 – December 19, 2014
- Episodes: 12
- icon

Tokkō Jimuin Minowa (特攻事務員ミノワ; "Suicide Attack Clerk Minowa") is a Japanese manga series written and illustrated by Kei Ogawa. It was serialized in Kodansha's seinen manga magazine Weekly Young Magazine from July to October 2013, with its chapters collected in two tankōbon volumes. A 12-episode television drama adaptation aired from October to December 2014.

== Characters ==
Minowa (箕輪)
Portrayed by: Matsu
Natsumi Takada (高田 夏美, Takada Natsumi)
Portrayed by: Sayaka Yamaguchi

== Media ==
=== Manga ===
Written and illustrated by Kei Ogawa, Tokkō Jimuin Minowa started in Kodansha's seinen manga magazine Weekly Young Magazine on July 1, 2013; the first part was concluded on October 21 of that same year, but there has been no further information on its continuation since then. Kodansha collected its chapters in two tankōbon volumes, released on November 6 and December 6, 2013, respectively.

=== Drama ===
A 12-episode television drama adaptation, titled Binta! Bengoshi Jimuin Minowa ga Ai de Kaiketsushimasu (ビンタ! 〜弁護士事務員ミノワが愛で解決します〜), was broadcast on Yomiuri TV and Nippon TV from October 2 to December 19, 2014. (Note: Yomiuri TV listed the last episode air date on December 18 at 24:09, which is effectively December 19 at 0:09 a.m. JST.)
