= Toshio Matsumoto (dancer) =

Japanese dancer, actor and director (born 1975)

- 松本 利夫
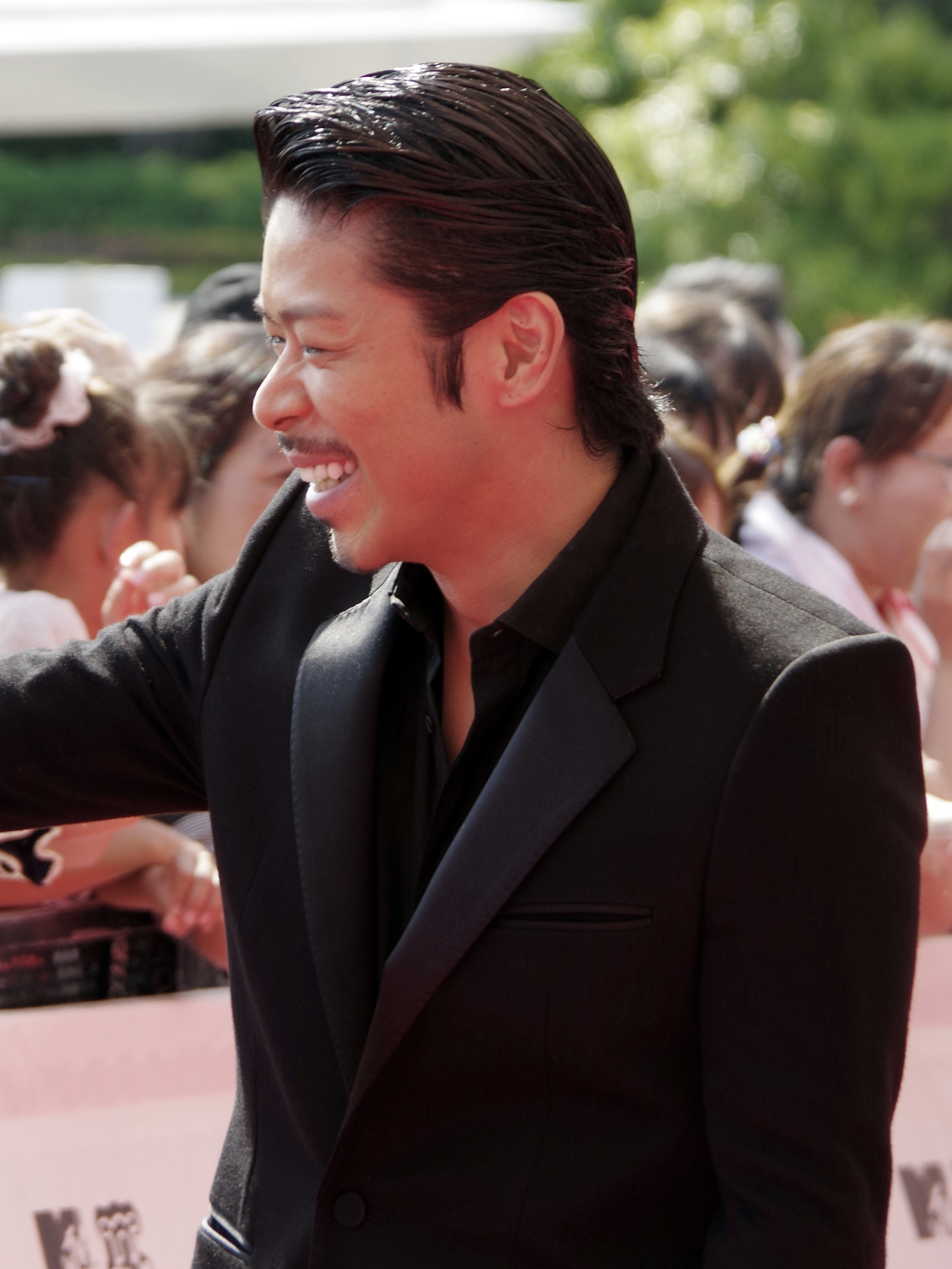
- Matsumoto at the 2014 MTV Video Music Awards Japan
- Born: 27 May 1975 (age 51); Kawasaki, Kanagawa, Japan
- Other name: Matsu
- Occupations: Dancer; actor; director
- Years active: 1994–
- Notable work: Film; Long Caravan; Stage; Taiyō ni Yaka rete; Matsu bocchi
- Television: Heaven's Flower The Legend of Arcana
- Children: 2
- Website: Official website

Toshio Matsumoto (松本 利夫, Matsumoto Toshio; nicknamed Matsu (stylized as MATSU); born 27 May 1975, in Kawasaki, Kanagawa) is a Japanese dancer, actor and director. He is member and former performer of J-Pop group Exile. He was part of the first generation J Soul Brothers. Since 2016 he has been serving as the chairman of the Gekidan Exile Matsu-gumi.

Matsumoto is represented with LDH.

== Participating groups ==
Group	Period of time	Ref.
Baby Nail	1994 – 1998	
Hip Hop Junkeez	1998	
J Soul Brothers	1999 – 24 August 2001	
Exile	24 August 2001 –	

== Personal life ==
On July 22, 2013, Matsu announced his engagement to a non-celebrity woman after 7 years of dating. The couple registered their marriage on January 1, 2014.

On April 21, 2016, it was announced that the couple had welcomed their first child, a boy.

== Filmography ==
=== Films ===
Year	Title	Role	Notes	Ref.
2013	Ties	Sadatora Ogata	Lead role	
2020	Wiseguy			
2024	Aimitagai			
2025	S-Friends 3	Hiroshi		
2025	S-Friends 4	Hiroshi		
2026	4 Outs: Back to the Ballgame	Kunie Izumi		

=== TV dramas ===
Year	Title	Role	Notes	Ref.
2013	GTO Shōgatsu Special! Fuyuyasumi mo Nekketsu Jugyōda	Mizushima	Television film	
2014	Minowa: Love and Law	Bunta Minowa	Lead role	

=== TV programmes ===
Year	Title	Notes	Ref.
2016-2020	Matsu bocchi	MC; first crown programme, first solo MC	

== Bibliography ==
=== Books ===
Year	Title	ISBN
2005	Love Music Dance	ISBN 978-4391131055
2016	Kizuna	ISBN 978-4344028760

=== Lyrics ===
Year	Title
2006	Exile "Why oh why...?"

== Productions ==
=== CD jackets ===
Year	Title
2003	Exile "Choo Choo Train"
2003	Exile "Eternal..."
2003	Exile "Ki-zu-na"
2003	Exile "O'ver"

=== DVD ===
Year	Title	Notes
2004	Exile EXPV 3	Director

=== Directorial theatre works ===
Year	Title	Ref.
2016	Kagerō	

=== Films ===
Year	Title	Notes
2016	Kabuki Drop	General producer
