= Exile (Japanese band) =

Japanese boy band

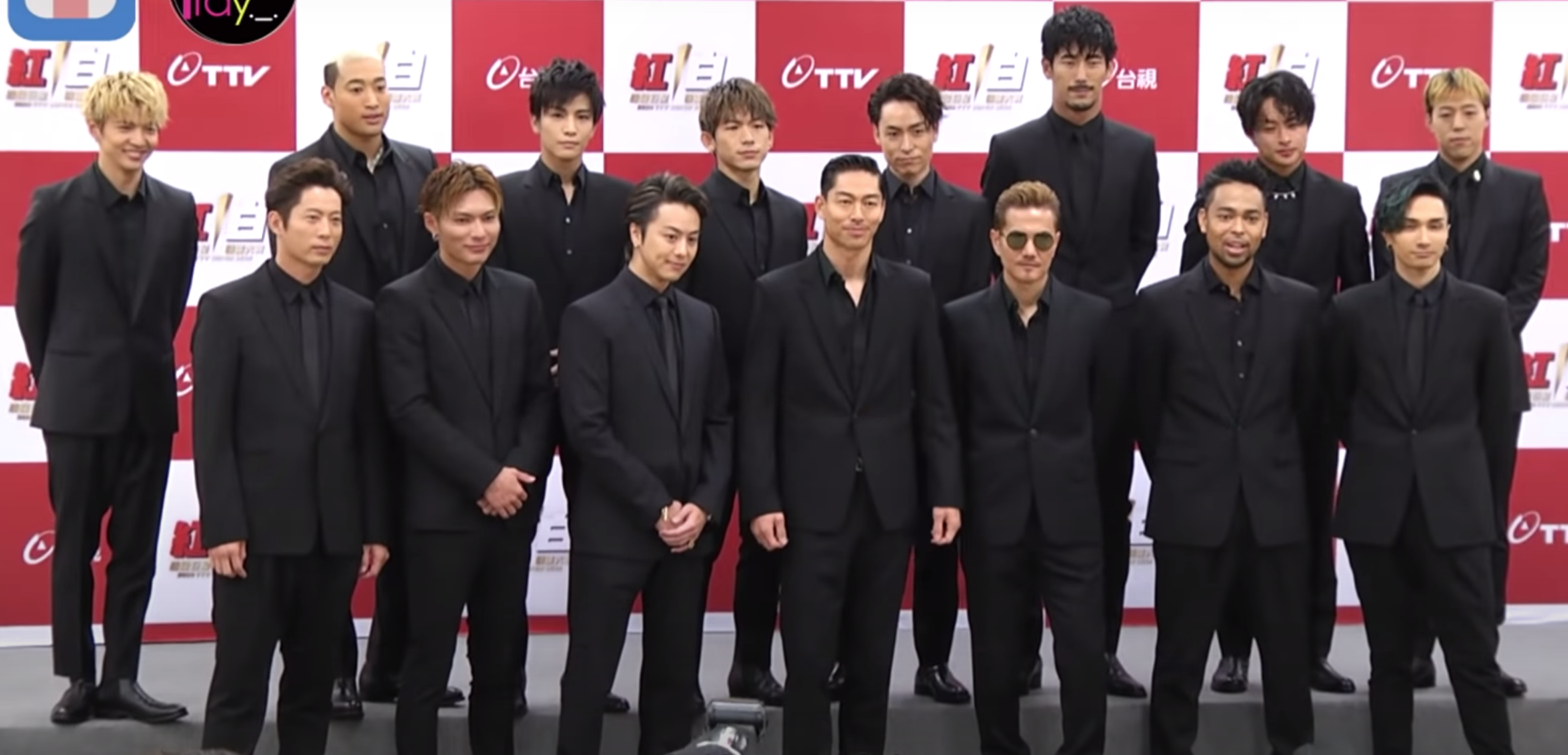
- Exile in Taiwan in January 2020

Background information
- Also known as: J Soul Brothers (1999–2001)
- Origin: Tokyo, Japan
- Genres: J-pop; R&B; dance; house
- Years active: 2001–present
- Labels: LDH; Rhythm Zone
- Spinoffs: J Soul Brothers; Exile Tribe
- Members: Exile Hiro; Toshio Matsumoto; Exile Makidai; Exile Usa; Exile Atsushi; Exile Akira; Exile Takahiro; Kenchi Tachibana; Exile Tetsuya; Exile Nesmith; Exile Shokichi; Exile Naoto; Naoki Kobayashi; Alan Shirahama; Sekai; Taiki Sato
- Past members: Shun; Keiji Kuroki; Mandy Sekiguchi; Takanori Iwata
- Website: exile.jp

Exile (stylized in all caps as EXILE) is a 17-member Japanese boy band. Hiro is the group's leader, who debuted as a member of Zoo under For Life Music, but Exile have released their singles and albums under Avex Group's label Rhythm Zone. Hiro and Avex's president Max Matsuura came from the same high school. In 2003, the six original members of Exile founded the management and entertainment company LDH which has debuted many successful groups and soloists ever since. Exile is the representative group of the company.

In total, they have sold over 15,600,000 albums.

== History ==
=== Pre-debut ===
The current leader, Hiro, was originally in the pop group Zoo before they split up in 1995. In 1999, he started a new group called J Soul Brothers, which later changed its name to Exile in 2001. (But the name of J Soul Brothers was later revived by Hiro again in 2007 when he helped to form another 7-member group under the new J Soul Brothers moniker.)

=== Debut and second generation ===
Atsushi and Shun became the lead vocalists of the group. Atsushi is a fan of American R&B group Boyz II Men. In November 2003, Exile remade Zoo's hit single "Choo Choo Train", which became a strong promotional single for their third studio album Exile Entertainment. The album sold over a million copies. They took part in the NHK Kōhaku Uta Gassen of the year, singing "Choo Choo Train". At first, their music style was influenced by R&B, but their style later became more pop-oriented form. Their 2004 single "Real World" became their first number-one single on Oricon weekly charts. They released the collaboration "Scream" with Japanese rock band Glay in July 2005, peaking at No. 1 and selling over 500,000 copies on Oricon charts.

The group released "Tada...Aitakute" in December 2005 and "Yes!" in March 2006. Both singles topped the Oricon weekly charts. However, Shun left the group in March 2006 and became a solo singer. After the group sought a new vocalist from the public, Takahiro Tasaki joined the group in September 2006 after winning Vocal Battle Audition, organized by LDH and open to male singers over the age of 18 with either a professional or amateur status. Takahiro originally trained to become a hairdresser in his school days and was initially a big fan of Exile, having attended one of their concerts in 2005; he eventually joined the group as a vocalist thanks to his victory in Vocal Battle Audition in fall 2006.

On February 14, 2007, the group released the single "Michi", which became their first number-one single on the Oricon charts since Takahiro joined the group. Their 2007 studio album, Exile Love, became the highest selling album of Japan in 2008, selling nearly 1.5 million copies on Oricon charts. Their compilation album Exile Ballad Best sold nearly 1 million copies in its first week on Oricon charts, making it the highest first week sales for an album of Japan in 2008. It is currently their best selling album with over 2 million copies sold. It was the 34th rank album for 2008. The song, "Ti Amo", was certified Million by the Recording Industry Association of Japan (RIAJ) for 1,000,000 full-track ringtone digital music downloads (Chaku Uta Full). They also won the Grand Prix Award at the 50th edition of Japan Record Awards for "Ti Amo".

=== Wider success: Third generation and Hiro's departure ===
In 2009, Exile's song "The Next Door" was featured as the theme of the Japanese edition of Street Fighter IV. The song was released at the iTunes Store on February 22, 2009. The English version "The Next Door -Indestructible-" was used for the international edition of the game. The English version was released as the third track of their single "The Hurricane (Fireworks)" on July 22, 2009, featuring American rapper Flo Rida.

On March 1, 2009, Exile and Nidaime J Soul Brothers announced that they would merge to become a 14-member group. They released their first studio album with 14 members, Aisubeki Mirai e, on December 2, 2009. They won the Grand Prix Award for the second year in a row with the song, "Someday", at the 51st Japan Record Awards.From May 9, Exile Live Tour 2009 'The Monster' started. At the end of the year, They won the Grand Prix Award for the second year in a row with the song, "Someday", at the 51st Japan Record Awards.

On April 17, 2010, Exile's TV talk show EXE started to be broadcast on TBS, while the show was also broadcast simultaneously on Taiwan's CTV channel. On May 19, 2010, Avex released the CD maxi of the suite "Taiyō no Kuni" (太陽の国), or "The Country of the Sun," written by Yasushi Akimoto and sung by Exile, for the 20th anniversary of the accedence of the Emperor of Japan Akihito. However, the CD was not reflected on the Oricon charts. From July 2010, Exile held their first stadium tour, Exile Live Tour 2010 Fantasy. For the 52nd Japan Record Awards, the group earned their third consecutive win with the song "I Wish For You". "I Wish For You" was also the theme song for Tokyo Broadcasting System's (TBS) domestic broadcasts of the 2010 FIVB Volleyball Women's World Championship and members of the band were in the crowd for Japan's bronze medal win, which was their first medal in 32 years.

From 2011, Exile started to perform in other Asian countries apart from its homeland Japan. They performed in The 2011 Jade Solid Gold Best Ten Music Awards Presentation in Hong Kong on January 15 as special guests. On September 25, Exile performed in Three Kingdoms Performing Arts – China, Japan, and Korea Music Festival in Beijing, which was Exile's first participation in a live performance events outside Japan. On September 14, 2011, Exile released "Rising Sun", a single contain Rising Sun, the famous and popular song in support of the recovery after the 2011 Tōhoku earthquake and tsunami. From November 2011, Exile started their second dome tour, Exile Live Tour 2011 Tower of Wish ～Tower of Wish～. The group was the 3rd artist by total sales revenue in Japan in 2011, with ¥5.603 billion, and the 2nd in 2012, with ¥12.177 billion.

On January 1, 2012, Exile released their ninth album EXILE JAPAN/Solo . The album landed 1st on Oricon Albums Chart for three continual weeks, which set a new record for the group. In June, Exile won Best Video of the Year at MTV Video Music Awards Japan, which marked Exile 4th wins in the award's 11 years history.

On April 3, 2013, EXILE's leader HIRO, who had been a performer for 24 years prior, announced that he would be retiring from the group as a performer at the end of 2013. He stated that he would still continue to be the leader and producer of the group. On the same day, EXILE released their 41st single "EXILE PRIDE ~Konna Sekai wo Aisuru Tame~". The single became Exile's first single to be sold more than 1 million copies in October of the same year, and it won the group a fourth Japan Record Award. This was the group's first win since their consecutive winning streak was broken by the Idol group AKB48, and Exile became the first artist to win the award four times. In April, Exile held their third dome tour called Exile Live Tour 2013 'Exile Pride' .

=== New era: Fourth generation members ===
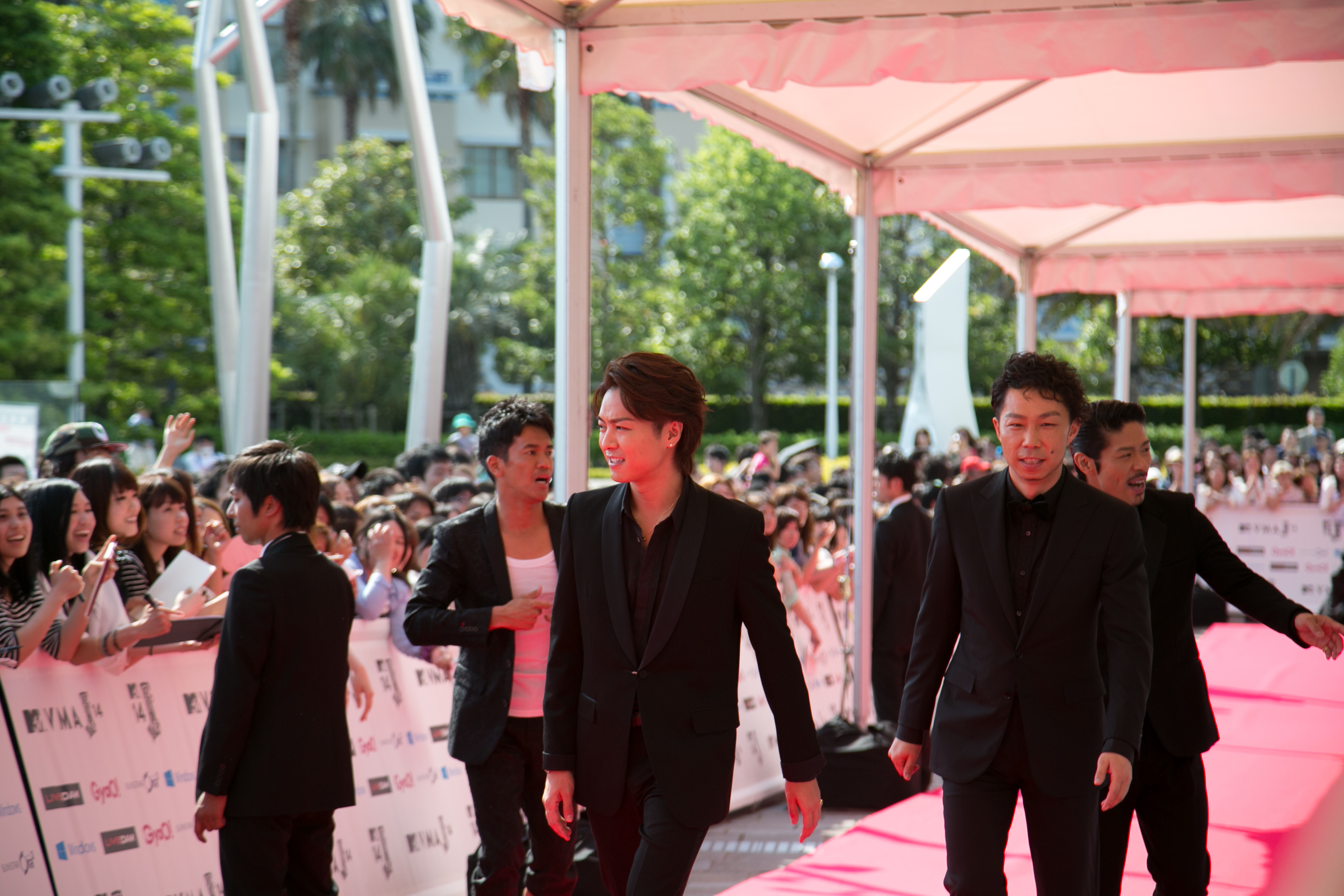
Exile members at the 2014 MTV Video Music Awards Japan

In April 2014, EXILE's Chapter 4 kicked off. On the final stage of EXILE's 3rd audition "EXILE PERFORMER BATTLE AUDITION", the winners, aka new members of Exile, were announced. Out of 2000 applicants, only 5 members were chosen. Those members were Takanori Iwata from Sandaime J Soul Brothers, Alan Shirahama and Mandy Sekiguchi from Generations, Sekai Yamamoto and Taiki Sato. Their first single in EXILE, "NEW HORIZON", was released a few months later, on July 23, 2014. From September, The new Exile started their first tour, Exile Tribe Perfect Year Live Tour Tower of Wish 2014 〜The Revolution〜. On March 25, 2015, the group released their tenth studio album 19 -Road to AMAZING WORLD-. From September 2015, They started a new national tour, Exile Live Tour 2015 'Amazing World'.

On June 22, 2015, members Toshio Matsumoto, ÜSA and MAKIDAI announced to be retiring from their positions of performers on the group within the year. Their last single with the group would be "Ki・mi・ni・mu・chu", a song which was used for the CM advertising Suntory's "The Malts". On December 31, 2015, Matsumoto Toshio, ÜSA and MAKIDAI retired from their positions of performers on the group on the New Year's special show CDTV Special! New Year's Eve Premiere Live 2015 → 2016. Although retiring as EXILE performers, ÜSA was revealed to remain as performer on the unit DANCE EARTH PARTY, and MAKIDAI would continue his music career as DJ MAKIDAI.

On April 14, 2016, a Documentary of Matsumoto Toshio, ÜSA and MAKIDAI's final tour 'AMAZING WORLD' was released .On August 17, 2016, Exile released their 48th singles, "Joy-ride ~Kanki no Drive~", which was Fuji television's theme song for the Rio Olympics.

On 25 July 2018, Exile released a new original Album, Star of Wish . From September, they started their 5th dome tour Exile Live Tour 2018–2019 'Star of Wish'.

== Group members ==
Since the formation of EXILE there have been many new generations of members as well as departures. As of 2021, AKIRA (Performer) is the longest serving active member of EXILE. Retired members are no longer active, but still considered part the group. There are currently 13 active members in the group.

=== Performers ===
| Stage name | Birth name | Born | Notes |
|---|---|---|---|
| Exile Akira | Ryōhei Kurosawa | August 23, 1981 (age 45) | Member of Exile the Second |
| Kenchi Tachibana (KENCHI) | Kenichirō Teratsuji | September 28, 1979 (age 47) | Member of Exile the Second |
| Exile Tetsuya | Tetsuya Tsuchida | February 18, 1981 (age 45) | Member of Exile the Second |
| Exile Naoto | Naoto Kataoka | August 30, 1983 (age 43) | Member of Sandaime J Soul Brothers |
| Naoki Kobayashi (NAOKI) | Naoki Kobayashi | November 10, 1984 (age 41) | Member of Sandaime J Soul Brothers |
| Alan Shirahama | | August 4, 1993 (age 33) | Member of Generations |
| Sekai | Sekai Yamamoto | February 21, 1991 (age 35) | Member of Fantastics |
| Taiki Sato | | January 25, 1995 (age 31) | Member of Fantastics |

=== Vocalists ===
| Stage name | Birth name | Born | Notes |
|---|---|---|---|
| Exile Atsushi | Atsushi Satō | April 30, 1980 (age 46) | |
| Exile Takahiro | Takahiro Tasaki | December 8, 1984 (age 41) | |

=== Vocalists and performers ===
| Stage name | Birth name | Born | Notes |
|---|---|---|---|
| Exile Nesmith | Nesmith Ryuta Karim | August 1, 1983 (age 43) | Member of Exile the Second |
| Exile Shokichi | Shokichi Yagi | October 3, 1985 (age 41) | Member of Exile the Second |

=== Retired performers ===
| Stage name | Birth name | Born | Notes |
|---|---|---|---|
| HIRO | Hiroyuki Igarashi | June 1, 1969 (age 57) | Leader & performer; oldest member of the group |
| MATSU | Toshio Matsumoto | May 27, 1975 (age 51) | Performer |
| MAKIDAI | Daisuke Maki | October 27, 1975 (age 50) | Performer |
| ÜSA | Yoshihiro Usami | February 2, 1977 (age 49) | Performer |

=== Former members ===
| Stage name | Birth name | Born | Notes |
|---|---|---|---|
| Shun | Shunsuke Kiyokiba | January 11, 1980 (age 46) | Vocalist |
| KEIJI | Keiji Kuroki | January 21, 1980 (age 46) | Performer; retired from the entertainment industry in fall 2022 |
| Mandy Sekiguchi | | January 25, 1991 (age 35) | Performer |
| Takanori Iwata | | March 6, 1989 (age 37) | Member of Sandaime J Soul Brothers |

== Discography ==
=== Albums ===
==== Studio albums ====
| Title | Release date | Peak position | RIAJ Certification | Total sales |
|---|---|---|---|---|
| Our Style | March 6, 2002 | 5 | Platinum | 291,000 |
| Styles of Beyond | February 13, 2003 | 1 | Platinum | 430,000 |
| Exile Entertainment | December 3, 2003 | 1 | Million | 1,176,090 |
| Asia | March 29, 2006 | 1 | 2× Platinum | 520,319 |
| Exile Evolution | March 7, 2007 | 1 | 3× Platinum | 762,335 |
| Exile Love (Note: Best selling album of 2008) | December 12, 2007 | 1 | Million | 1,480,088 |
| Aisubeki Mirai e | December 2, 2009 | 1 | Million | 1,299,235 |
| Negai no Tō | March 9, 2011 | 1 | Million | 760,341 |
| Exile Japan/Solo (Note: Includes Atsushi's solo debut album, therefore they were credited as "Exile/Exile Atsushi".) | January 1, 2012 | 1 | 3× Platinum | 767,274 |
| 19: Road to Amazing World | March 25, 2015 | 1 | Platinum | 283,862 |
| Star of Wish | July 25, 2018 | 1 | | |
| Phoenix | January 1, 2022 | 6 | | 16,132 |
| Power of Wish | December 7, 2022 | 3 | | 41,178 |

==== Best-of albums ====
| Title | Release date | Peak position | RIAJ Certification | Total sales |
|---|---|---|---|---|
| Perfect Best (Note: Perfect Best contains special 2CD+DVD version which included Single Best and Select Best plus 21 songs promotional video clips DVD.) | January 1, 2005 | 1 | Million | 1,624,541 |
| Exile Catchy Best | March 26, 2008 | 1 | Million | 1,287,955 |
| Exile Entertainment Best | July 23, 2008 | 1 | 3× Platinum | 638,959 |
| Exile Ballad Best (Note: Highest debut sales of any album in 2008.) | December 3, 2008 | 1 | 2x Million | 1,852,823 |
| Exile Best Hits: Love Side/Soul Side | December 5, 2012 | 1 | 3× Platinum | 700,030 |
| Extreme Best | September 27, 2016 | 2 | - | - |
| 24karats Golden Best | May 20, 2026 | - | - | - |
| Party Tune: Best Selection | January 1, 2027 | - | - | - |

==== Other albums ====
| Title | Release date | Peak position | Sales |
|---|---|---|---|
| The Other Side of Ex Vol. 1 | September 10, 2003 | 5 | |
| Appreciation to the Million Breakthrough | March 31, 2004 | 55 | |
| Heart of Gold: Street Future Opera Beat Pops | September 29, 2004 | 1 | 476,626 |
| Exile Perfect Year 2008 Ultimate Best Box | March 25, 2009 | 27 | |

=== Singles ===
| Title | Release date | Peak position | Oricon Sales |
|---|---|---|---|
| "Your Eyes Only: Aimai na Boku no Katachi" | September 27, 2001 | 4 | 249,880 |
| "Style" | December 12, 2001 | 11 | 112,760 |
| "Fly Away" | February 20, 2002 | 18 | 31,880 |
| "Song for You" | April 17, 2002 | 6 | 91,750 |
| "Cross: Never Say Die" | August 7, 2002 | 13 | 38,410 |
| "Ex-style: Kiss You" | November 13, 2002 | 6 | 92,769 |
| "We Will: Ano Basho de" | February 5, 2003 | 16 | 32,703 |
| "Breezin: Together" | May 28, 2003 | 2 | 366,804 |
| "Let Me Luv U Down" feat. Zeebra & Maccho | July 9, 2003 | 3 | 64,854 |
| "Choo Choo Train" | November 6, 2003 | 2 | 286,812 |
| "Eternal..." | November 12, 2003 | 7 | 46,762 |
| "Ki•zu•na" | November 19, 2003 | 5 | 40,468 |
| "O'ver" | November 27, 2003 | 7 | 33,822 |
| "Carry On" / "Unmei no Hito" | May 12, 2004 | 2 | 233,120 |
| "Real World" | June 30, 2004 | 1 | 125,809 |
| "Heart of Gold" | August 18, 2004 | 4 | 93,873 |
| "Hero" | December 1, 2004 | 2 | 181,997 |
| "Exit" | August 24, 2005 | 2 | 202,827 |
| "Tada...Aitakute" (ただ...逢いたくて) | December 14, 2005 | 1 | 562,196 |
| "Yes!" | March 1, 2006 | 1 | 92,622 |
| "Everything" | December 6, 2006 | 2 | 153,065 |
| "Lovers Again" | January 17, 2007 | 2 | 257,393 |
| "Michi" | February 14, 2007 | 1 | 112,106 |
| "Summer Time Love" | May 16, 2007 | 3 | 132,824 |
| "Toki no Kakera / 24 karats: type EX" (時の描片 ～トキノカケラ～) | August 29, 2007 | 2 | 142,202 |
| "I Believe" | November 21, 2007 | 3 | 142,228 |
| "Pure" / "You're My Sunshine" | February 27, 2008 | 2 | 160,605 |
| "Ti Amo" | September 24, 2008 | 1 | 320,445 |
| "Last Christmas" (Wham! cover with new Japanese lyrics) | November 26, 2008 | 1 | 226,829 |
| "Someday" | April 15, 2009 | 1 | 270,513 |
| "Fireworks" | July 22, 2009 | 1 | 279,264 |
| "Futatsu no Kuchibiru" | November 11, 2009 | 2 | 288,454 |
| "Fantasy" | June 9, 2010 | 1 (Note: Nine-track "Double maxi single" that charted at number 1 on Oricon albums chart.) | 473,051 |
| "Motto Tsuyoku" (もっと強く; Stronger) | September 15, 2010 | 1 | 230,564 |
| "I Wish For You" | October 6, 2010 | 2 | 276,875 |
| "Each Other's Way (Tabi no Tochū)" | February 9, 2011 | 1 | 119,419 |
| "Rising Sun" / "Itsuka Kitto..." | September 14, 2011 | 1 | 317,630 |
| "Anata e" / "Ooo Baby" | November 23, 2011 | 2 | 151,551 |
| "All Night Long" | June 20, 2012 | 1 | 242,290 |
| "Bow & Arrows" | July 25, 2012 | 2 | 117,334 |
| "Exile Pride (Konna Sekai o Ai Suru Tame)" (こんな世界を愛するため) | April 3, 2013 | 1 | 1,016,992 |
| "Flower Song" | June 19, 2013 | 2 | 126,405 |
| "No Limit" | September 25, 2013 | 2 | 95,204 |
| "New Horizon" | July 23, 2014 | 1 | 147,572 |
| "Craving in My Soul" | July 23, 2014 | 1 | 147,572 |
| "Jonetsu no Hana" (情熱の花) | March 4, 2015 | 2 | 73,956 |
| "24karats Gold Soul" | August 19, 2015 | 3 | 103,021 |
| "Ki mi ni mu chu" | December 9, 2015 | 2 | 123,642 |
| "Joy-ride (Kanki no Drive)" (歓喜のドライブ; Drive of Happiness) | August 17, 2016 | 2 | |
| "Party All Night (Star of Wish)" | February 2, 2018 | | |
| "Melody" | March 2, 2018 | | |
| "My Star" | April 6, 2018 | | |
| "Turn Back Time" featuring FANTASTICS | May 4, 2018 | | |
| "Awakening" | June 1, 2018 | | |
| "Step Up" | July 6, 2018 | | |
| "Love of History" | January 3, 2019 | | |
| "Ai no Tame ni (For love, for a child)" | January 1, 2020 | 2 | |
| "Sunshine" | December 16, 2020 | 3 | |
| "Paradox" | April 27, 2021 | 7 | |
| "One Nation" | May 27, 2021 | | |
| "Havana Love" | July 1, 2021 | | |
| "Be the One" | May 27, 2022 | | |
| "Power of Wish" | July 1, 2022 | | |
| "Reason" | April 26, 2023 | | |
| "Get-Go!" | September 27, 2025 | 6 | 13,380 |

==== Collaborations ====
| Collaborated with | Title | Release date | Peak position | Oricon Sales |
|---|---|---|---|---|
| Glay | "Scream" | July 20, 2005 | 1 | 537,783 |
| Kumi Koda | "Won't Be Long" | November 22, 2006 | 2 | 223,637 |
| Exile Tribe | "24karats Tribe of Gold" | September 5, 2012 | 2 | 203,584 |
| Tak Matsumoto | "24karats Gold Legacy" | March 30, 2026 | | |

==== Others ====
| Title | Release date |
|---|---|
| "Song Soldier: Ashita no Senshi" (ソングソルジャー～明日の戦士～, Song Soldier: Tomorrow's Soldier) | March 7, 2007 |

== Awards and nominations ==
List of awards and nominations received by Exile
| Award ceremony | Year | Category | Nominee(s) / Work(s) | Result | Ref. |
|---|---|---|---|---|---|
| Billboard Japan Music Awards | 2009 | Artist of the Year | Exile | Won | |
| Billboard Japan Music Awards | 2009 | Top Pop Artists | Exile | Won | |
| Billboard Japan Music Awards | 2009 | Album of the Year | Exile Ballad Best | Won | |
| Billboard Japan Music Awards | 2010 | Artist of the Year | Exile | Won | |
| Billboard Japan Music Awards | 2010 | Top Pop Artists | Exile | Won | |
| Billboard Japan Music Awards | 2010 | Album of the Year | Aisubeki Mirai e | Won | |
| Billboard Japan Music Awards | 2012 | Top Pop Artists | Exile | Won | |
| Billboard Japan Music Awards | 2013 | Top Pop Artists | Exile | Won | |
| Japan Cable Awards | 2001 | Cable Music Award | "Your Eyes Only: Aimai na Boku no Katachi" | Won | |
| Japan Cable Awards | 2004 | Grand Prize | "Choo Choo Train" | Nominated | |
| Japan Cable Awards | 2004 | Best Cable Music | "Choo Choo Train" | Won | |
| Japan Cable Awards | 2004 | Grand Prize | "Heart of Gold" | Nominated | |
| Japan Cable Awards | 2004 | Best Cable Music | "Heart of Gold" | Won | |
| Japan Cable Awards | 2004 | Most Requested Artist | Exile | Won | |
| Japan Cable Awards | 2008 | Grand Prize | "Ti Amo" | Won | |
| Japan Cable Awards | 2008 | Best Cable Music | "Ti Amo" | Won | |
| Japan Cable Awards | 2008 | Most Requested Artist | Exile | Won | |
| Japan Gold Disc Awards | 2004 | Rock & Pop Album of the Year | Exile Entertainment | Won | |
| Japan Gold Disc Awards | 2005 | Rock & Pop Album of the Year | Heart of Gold: Street Future Opera Beat Pops | Won | |
| Japan Gold Disc Awards | 2006 | Song of the Year | "Tada···Aitakute" | Won | |
| Japan Gold Disc Awards | 2006 | Song of the Year | "Scream" (Glay X Exile) | Won | |
| Japan Gold Disc Awards | 2006 | Rock & Pop Album of the Year | Single Best | Won | |
| Japan Gold Disc Awards | 2006 | Rock & Pop Album of the Year | Perfect Best | Won | |
| Japan Gold Disc Awards | 2007 | Best 10 Albums | Asia | Won | |
| Japan Gold Disc Awards | 2008 | Artist of the Year | Exile | Won | |
| Japan Gold Disc Awards | 2008 | Best 5 Chaku-Uta Songs | "Lovers Again" | Won | |
| Japan Gold Disc Awards | 2008 | Best 5 Chaku-Uta Full Songs | "Lovers Again" | Won | |
| Japan Gold Disc Awards | 2008 | Best 5 PC Download Songs | "Lovers Again" | Won | |
| Japan Gold Disc Awards | 2008 | Album of the Year | Exile Love | Won | |
| Japan Gold Disc Awards | 2008 | Best 10 Albums | Exile Love | Won | |
| Japan Gold Disc Awards | 2008 | Best 10 Albums | Exile Evolution | Won | |
| Japan Gold Disc Awards | 2008 | Best Music Videos | Exile Live Tour 2007 Exile Evolution | Won | |
| Japan Gold Disc Awards | 2009 | Artist of the Year | Exile | Won | |
| Japan Gold Disc Awards | 2009 | Best 5 Chaku-Uta Songs | "Ti Amo" | Won | |
| Japan Gold Disc Awards | 2009 | Best 5 Chaku-Uta Full Songs | "Ti Amo" | Won | |
| Japan Gold Disc Awards | 2009 | Album of the Year | Exile Ballad Best | Won | |
| Japan Gold Disc Awards | 2009 | Best 10 Albums | Exile Ballad Best | Won | |
| Japan Gold Disc Awards | 2009 | Best 10 Albums | Exile Catchy Best | Won | |
| Japan Gold Disc Awards | 2009 | Best 10 Albums | Exile Entertainment Best | Won | |
| Japan Gold Disc Awards | 2010 | Best 5 Songs | "Futatsu no Kuchibiru" | Won | |
| Japan Gold Disc Awards | 2010 | Best 5 Albums | Aisubeki Mirai e | Won | |
| Japan Gold Disc Awards | 2010 | Best Music Videos | Exile Live Tour "Exile Perfect Live 2008" | Won | |
| Japan Gold Disc Awards | 2011 | Best 5 Albums | Fantasy | Won | |
| Japan Gold Disc Awards | 2011 | Best 5 Songs | "Motto Tsuyoku" | Won | |
| Japan Gold Disc Awards | 2012 | Best 5 Albums | Negai no Tō | Won | |
| Japan Gold Disc Awards | 2013 | Best 5 Albums | Exile Japan/Solo | Won | |
| Japan Gold Disc Awards | 2013 | Best Music Videos | Exile Tribe Live Tour 2012 "Tower Of Wish" | Won | |
| Japan Gold Disc Awards | 2013 | Best Music Videos | Exile Live Tour 2011 "Tower Of Wish: Negai no Tō" | Won | |
| Japan Gold Disc Awards | 2014 | Best 5 Albums | Exile Best Hits: Love Side/Soul Side | Won | |
| Japan Record Awards | 2003 | Grand Prix | "Together" | Nominated | |
| Japan Record Awards | 2003 | Best Singer | "Together" | Nominated | |
| Japan Record Awards | 2003 | Gold Award | "Together" | Won | |
| Japan Record Awards | 2004 | Grand Prix | "Carry On" | Nominated | |
| Japan Record Awards | 2004 | Best Singer | "Carry On" | Nominated | |
| Japan Record Awards | 2004 | Gold Award | "Carry On" | Won | |
| Japan Record Awards | 2006 | Special Award | "Won't Be Long" | Won | |
| Japan Record Awards | 2007 | Grand Prix | "Toki no kakera" | Nominated | |
| Japan Record Awards | 2007 | Best Singer | "Toki no kakera" | Won | |
| Japan Record Awards | 2007 | Gold Award | "Toki no kakera" | Won | |
| Japan Record Awards | 2008 | Grand Prix | "Ti Amo" | Won | |
| Japan Record Awards | 2008 | Excellent Work Award | "Ti Amo" | Won | |
| Japan Record Awards | 2009 | Grand Prix | "Someday" | Won | |
| Japan Record Awards | 2009 | Excellent Work Award | "Someday" | Won | |
| Japan Record Awards | 2010 | Grand Prix | "I Wish For You" | Won | |
| Japan Record Awards | 2010 | Excellent Work Award | "I Wish For You" | Won | |
| Japan Record Awards | 2013 | Grand Prix | "Exile Pride: Konna Sekai o Aisuru Tame" | Won | |
| Japan Record Awards | 2013 | Excellent Work Award | "Exile Pride: Konna Sekai o Aisuru Tame" | Won | |
| MTV Video Music Awards Japan | 2003 | Best Live Performance | Exile | Nominated | |
| MTV Video Music Awards Japan | 2004 | Best Album of the Year | Exile Entertainment | Nominated | |
| MTV Video Music Awards Japan | 2005 | Best Group Video | "Carry On" | Nominated | |
| MTV Video Music Awards Japan | 2005 | Best Pop Video | "Carry On" | Nominated | |
| MTV Video Music Awards Japan | 2005 | Best BuzzAsia Japan | "Real World" | Nominated | |
| MTV Video Music Awards Japan | 2006 | Best Collaboration (Glay x Exile) | "Scream" | Nominated | |
| MTV Video Music Awards Japan | 2007 | Best Group Video | "Lovers Again" | Won | |
| MTV Video Music Awards Japan | 2008 | Best Video of the Year | "I Believe" | Won | |
| MTV Video Music Awards Japan | 2008 | Best Album of the Year | Exile Love | Won | |
| MTV Video Music Awards Japan | 2008 | Best Karaoke Song | "Toki no Kakera" | Won | |
| MTV Video Music Awards Japan | 2009 | Best Video of the Year | "Ti Amo (Chapter 2)" | Won | |
| MTV Video Music Awards Japan | 2009 | Best Group Video | "Ti Amo (Chapter 2)" | Won | |
| MTV Video Music Awards Japan | 2009 | MTV Best Choreography Award | Exile | Nominated | |
| MTV Video Music Awards Japan | 2010 | Best Video of the Year | "Futatsu no Kuchibiru" | Won | |
| MTV Video Music Awards Japan | 2010 | Album of the Year | Aisubeki Mirai e | Won | |
| MTV Video Music Awards Japan | 2010 | MTV Asia Icon Award | Exile | Won | |
| MTV Video Music Awards Japan | 2012 | Best Video of the Year | "Rising Sun" | Won | |
| MTV Video Music Awards Japan | 2014 | Best Video of the Year | "Exile Pride: Konna Sekai o Aisuru Tame" | Won | |
| Space Shower Music Video Awards | 2009 | Best Story Video | "Ti Amo" | Won | |
| Space Shower Music Video Awards | 2010 | Best Shooting Video | "Futatsu no Kuchibiru" | Won | |

== See also ==
- Japan Record Award
- MTV Video Music Awards Japan
- List of best-selling music artists in Japan
