= 50th Japan Record Awards =

2008 Japanese music awards ceremony

- Date: December 30, 2008
- Venue: New National Theatre, Tokyo
- Hosted by: Masaaki Sakai, Aya Ueto, Nao Matsushita

Television/radio coverage
- Network: TBS

The 50th Annual Japan Record Awards took place at the New National Theatre in Shibuya, Tokyo, on December 30, 2008, starting at 6:30PM JST. The primary ceremonies were televised in Japan on TBS.

== Performers ==
- Wink
- Kome Kome Club
- Aki Yashiro
- Shinichi Mori

== Awards winners ==
- Japan Record Award: - Ti Amo
  - Artist: Exile
  - Songwriter and Composer: Kiyoshi Matsuo
  - Composer and Arranger Jin Nakamura
  - Record companies: Avex Entertainment
- Best Vocal Performance: Mitsuko Nakamura - Onna no Tabiji
- Best New Artist: Jero - Umiyuki
- Best album: Namie Amuro - Best Fiction

== Nominees ==
=== Japan Record Awards ===
- Thelma Aoyama feat. SoulJa — "Soba ni Iru ne"
- Junko Akimoto — "Ai no mama de" (愛のままで...)
- W-inds. — "Ame Ato" (アメあと)
- Exile — "Ti Amo"
- Cute (°C-ute) — "Edo no Temari Uta II"
- Kumi Koda — "Moon Crying"
- Kazuyoshi Saito — "Ya Mujō" (やぁ 無情)
- Nana Tanimura — "Jungle Dance"
- Tohoshinki — "Dōshite Kimi o Suki ni Natte Shimattandarō?"
- Kiyoshi Hikawa — "Genkai Funauta" (玄海船歌)
- Kaori Mizumori — "Wajima Asaichi" (輪島朝市)
- Mihimaru GT — "Girigiri Hero"

=== Best New Artist ===
- Girl Next Door
- Jero
- Kimaguren
- Mai Fukui
- Kumiko Sakurai

== See also ==
- 59th NHK Kōhaku Uta Gassen
