= Town Doctor Jumbo!! =

Japanese manga and television series

町医者ジャンボ! (Machiisha Jumbo!!)
- Genre: Comedy, slice of life
- Manga
- Written by: Ryō Koshino
- Published by: Kodansha
- Magazine: Shūkan Gendai
- Original run: October 21, 2011 (volume 1) – March 2, 2015
- Volumes: 13
- Television drama
- Studio: Media Mix Japan; Yomiuri Telecasting Corporation
- Original network: NNS (YTV)
- Original run: July 4, 2013 – September 26, 2013
- Episodes: 13

Town Doctor Jumbo!! (Japanese: 町医者ジャンボ!!, Hepburn: Machiisha Jumbo!!) is a Japanese slice of life medical comedy seinen manga series written and illustrated by Ryō Koshino. It's published since 2011 by Kodansha in Shūkan Gendai magazine. The last chapter will be published on March 2, 2015. The chapters have so far been compiled into 13 volumes. A Japanese television drama series adaptation was broadcast in 2013.

== Cast ==
- Daisuke Maki as Dr. Jumbo
- Shiori Kutsuna as Hichō
- Yō Yoshida
- Yuko Fueki
- Toshinori Omi

== Volumes ==
- 1 (October 21, 2011)
- 2 (January 23, 2012)
- 3 (April 23, 2012)
- 4 (July 23, 2012)
- 5 (October 23, 2012)
- 6 (February 22, 2013)
- 7 (May 23, 2013)
- 8 (September 20, 2013)
- 9 (December 20, 2013)
- 10 (March 20, 2014)
- 11 (June 23, 2014)
- 12 (September 22, 2014)
- 13 (December 22, 2014)
- 14 (March 23, 2015)
