= Rhythm Zone =

Japanese record label

- Parent company: Avex Group
- Founded: 1999
- Founder: Max Matsuura
- Distributor: Avex Marketing
- Genre: Pop, contemporary R&B
- Country of origin: Japan
- Location: Minato, Tokyo
- Official website: rhythmzone.net

Rhythm Zone (リズムゾーン, Rizumu Zōn) (RZN) is a record label in the Avex Group that releases urban contemporary Japanese music.

== History ==
The "RZ mark" (former logo).

The label was founded in 1999 by Max Matsuura with a focus on urban music, signing M-Flo as its first artist, then followed by Exile.

In 2000, Koda Kumi was signed by Rhythm Zone and debuted with the song "Take Back".

== Artists and sublabels ==
=== Main ===
As of 2011:

- Afra and the Incredible Beatbox Band
- Aili
- Aria
- Asako Toki
- Asia Engineer
- Baby M
- Boyz II Men (Japan only)
- Bright
- Caravan
- The Chill
- Deep (formerly Color)
- Dorlis
- Dream
- DJ Emma
- Exile
  - Atsushi (Atsushi Sato)
  - Nesmith (Ryuta Karim Nesmith)
- FAKY
- Fukumimi
- Giant Swing
- Happiness
- Miyuki Hatakeyama
- Yuko Ishida
- Iconiq (Ito Ayumi)
- J Soul Brothers
- Jamosa
- Jonte
- Joey Boy
- Ken the 390
- Kumi Koda
- Seara Kojo
- Lisa
- M-Flo
  - Ryu Yeong-gi (Verbal)
  - Taku Takahashi
- Mai
- May J.
- Micron' Stuff
- Mini Box
- mink
- Miray
- Shion Miyawaki
- Nao
- Ohashi Trio
- Shinichi Osawa
- Quadraphonic
- Ryohei
- Misako Sakazume
- Sowelu
- Satomi Takasugi
- Riki Takeuchi
- Tenjochiki
- Tomita Lab
- Twenty4-7
- Masaya Wada
- Warp-Generation
- yu-yu
- Zan
- I Don't Like Mondays.
- Harry Hill

=== Fluctus ===
(Genre: rock)

- Unchain

=== Riddim Zone ===
(Genre: reggae. Founded in 2006 by Ryo the Skywalker.)

- Akane
- NG Head
- Natural Radio Station
- Rankin Taxi
- Rickie-G
- Ryo the Skywalker
- Tsuyoshi Kawakami and His Moodmakers (Justa/Riddim Zone)
- U-Dou and Platy

=== Former affiliates ===
- Maki Nomiya (野宮 真貴) (2005–2006)
- Shunsuke Kiyokiba (清木場 俊介) (2001–2009)
- Tohoshinki (2004–2010)
- 2NE1 (Avex/Rhythm Zone/YGEX) (2009–2016)
- JYJ (2010–2013)

== See also ==
- Avex Trax
- J-pop
- List of record labels
