= List of Oricon number-one albums of 2016 =

The following is a list of Oricon number-one albums of 2016.

== Chart history ==
Issue date	Album	Artist(s)	Reference(s)
January 4	Fuku no Oto (福の音)	Masaharu Fukuyama	
January 11	D×D×D	SHINee	
January 18	Utamonogatari - Monogatari Series Shūdaikashū (Theme Song Collection)	Various	
January 25	Ryōseibai (両成敗)	Gesu no Kiwami Otome	
February 1	miwa ballad collection ~graduation~	miwa	
February 8	YAMA-P	Yamashita Tomohisa	
February 15	Made Series	BigBang	
February 22	Butterflies	Bump of Chicken	
February 29	Hakkin no Yoake (白金の夜明け)	Momoiro Clover Z	
March 7	Welcome to Sexy Zone	Sexy Zone	
March 14	Speedster	Generations from Exile Tribe	
March 21	Quartetto	News	
March 28	Chō Ikimonobakari - Tennen Kinen Members BEST Selection	Ikimono-gakari	
April 4	KAT-TUN 10th Anniversary BEST 10Ks	KAT-TUN	
April 11	The JSB Legacy	Sandaime J Soul Brothers	
April 18	Cosmic Explorer	Perfume	
April 25	L’EPILOGUE	Kyosuke Himuro	
May 2	Ano Hi Ano Toki (あの日 あの時)'	Kazumasa Oda	
May 9	Galaxy of 2PM	2PM	
May 16	Ano Hi Ano Toki (あの日 あの時)'	Kazumasa Oda	
May 23	2020 -T.M.Revolution ALL TIME BEST-	T.M.Revolution	
May 30	May Dream	Aiko	
June 6	Sorezore no Isu	Nogizaka46	
June 13	THE IDOLM@STER CINDERELLA MASTER Cute jewelries! 003	The Cinderella Project	
June 20	Grateful Rebirth	Tsuyoshi Domoto	
June 27	HiGH & LOW ORIGINAL BEST ALBUM	Various	
July 4	I SCREAM	Kis-My-Ft2	
July 11	THE IDOLM@STER CINDERELLA MASTER Cool jewelries! 003	The Cinderella Project	
July 18	Dreams Come True The Ura Best! Watashi Dake no Dorikamu	Dreams Come True	
July 25	Just LOVE	Kana Nishino	
August 1	Just LOVE	Kana Nishino	
August 8	DEAR	Hey! Say! JUMP	
August 15	DEAR	Hey! Say! JUMP	
August 22	Yu 13-14	Unicorn	
August 29	Just LOVE	Kana Nishino	
September 5	Your Name	Radwimps	
September 12	Your Name	Radwimps	
September 19	Youth	BTS	
September 26	THIS IS Flower THIS IS BEST	Flower	
October 3	N Album	KinKi Kids	
October 10	Fantôme	Hikaru Utada	
October 17	Fantôme	Hikaru Utada	
October 24	Fantôme	Hikaru Utada	
October 31	Fantôme	Hikaru Utada	
November 7	Are You Happy?	Arashi	
November 14	Universal Library	Yumi Matsutoya	
November 21	EXIST!	Alexandros	
November 28	Sexy Zone 5th Anniversary Best	Sexy Zone	
December 5	Human Bloom	Radwimps	
December 12	Nawest	Johnny's West	
December 19	24 / 7	BtoB	
December 26	Ifu Dodo -B.M.C.A.-	Boys and Men	

== See also ==
- List of Oricon number-one singles of 2016
