= Chiharu Muto =

Japanese businesswoman and singer (born 1995)

Chiharu Muto 武藤 千春
- Born: 3 April 1995 (age 31); Tokyo, Japan
- Genres: J-pop
- Occupations: Businesswoman; singer
- Instrument: Vocal
- Years active: 2011–
- Labels: Sony Music Associated Records (2011–14); B-Crew Records (2017); Yui Entertainment (2017)

Chiharu Muto (武藤 千春, Mutō Chiharu; born 3 April 1995) is a Japanese businesswoman and singer. She is the creative director of the fashion brand "Blixzy". She is a former member of Flower and E-girls.

== Biography ==
She went to the Exile Professional Gym (EXPG) in Tokyo.

In 2011, she passed the vocal division of "Vocal Battle Audition 3" and joined Flower and E-girls.

On 12 October 2014 she announced to withdraw from Flower and E-girls to study abroad. On 26 October, with the Exile Tribe live performed at Kyocera Dome Osaka, she withdrew from E-girls. On 13 November, she later withdrew from Flower with a commemorative event of the single "Akikaze no Answer" at Ikebukuro Sunshine City.

On 16 February 2015, she announced the establishment of her own fashion brand "Blixzy". She is a creative director and performs total production including brand designing, modelling, and promoting.

On 16 August 2017, her solo single "Nobody Like You" became her first solo work sold at a Blixzy Harajuku store. Although she made her singing activity for the first time in about three years, she told on her blog that there was no intention to become active afterwards.

== Discography ==
=== Singles (indies) ===
| Date | Title |
|---|---|
| 16 Aug 2017 | Nobody Like You |

== Filmography ==
=== Films ===
| Date | Title | Distributor | Ref. |
|---|---|---|---|
| 19 Mar 2011 | Runway Beat | Shochiku | |
