= The Queen of Villains =

2024 Japanese sports drama television series

Japanese name
- Kanji: 極悪女王
Transcriptions
- Revised Hepburn: Gokuaku Joō
- Genre: Sports drama
- Created by: Osamu Suzuki
- Written by: Osamu Suzuki; Junya Ikegami
- Directed by: Kazuya Shiraishi (1–3, general manager); Katsuhito Mogi (4–5)
- Starring: Yuriyan Retriever; Erika Karata; Ayame Goriki
- Opening theme: Yuriyan Retriever "Dump the Heel"
- Ending theme: Awich "Are You Serious?"
- Composer: Hideakira Kimura
- Country of origin: Japan
- Original language: Japanese
- No. of episodes: 5

Production
- Executive producer: Shinichi Takahashi
- Producers: Haruhiko Hasegawa; Hidehisa Chiwata
- Cinematography: Atsuhiro Nabeshima (photography); Tsutomu Imamura (artworks); Kagethuyoshi (lighting)
- Editors: Hitomi Kato; Kazumi Wakimoto
- Running time: 60–82 minutes
- Production company: Kadokawa Daiei Studios

Original release
- Network: Netflix
- Release: 19 September 2024

The Queen of Villains (Japanese: 極悪女王, Hepburn: Gokuaku Joō) is a Japanese sports drama Japanese Netflix streaming television series planned by Osamu Suzuki, wrote the screenplay Osamu Suzuki and Junya Ikegami, directed Kazuya Shiraishi and Katsuhito Mogi. The series consists of five episodes, all first released on 19 September 2024.

The show stars Yuriyan Retriever in the role of Dump Matsumoto. Formerly known as Matsumoto Kaori, she was a kind girl aiming to become a female professional wrestler in order to become stronger. However, she became hated by all the Japanese people, the most famous heel in the history of Japanese women's professional wrestling, "Dump Matsumoto."

This drama is a fact-based fictional story that depicts the madness of All Japan Women's Pro-Wrestling in the 1980s, centering on the rivalry between Dump Matsumoto and Nagayo Chigusa, the protagonists of the famous Hair-Cutting Death Match (hair vs. hair match) in Japanese women's professional wrestling history.

However, despite being marketed as a drama, it also contains elements of non-fiction and documentary.

== Cast and characters ==
=== Main ===
- Yuriyan Retriever as Dump Matsumoto: A kind-hearted girl, Kaori Matsumoto grew up in a horrible home with a father who was addicted to alcohol, violent, in debt, and having an affair. She happened to see Jackie Sato practicing in the ring of "All Japan Women's Pro-Wrestling" and aspired to become a female professional wrestler after being captivated by her. After much deliberation, Kaori auditioned and enrolled. However, unlike Tomoko Kitamura and Yukari Omori, who debuted earlier, Kaori, along with Chigusa Nagayo, fell behind. Later, Chigusa, along with Tomoko—who changed her name to "Lioness Asuka"—became massively popular as the "Crush Gals" tag team. Kaori became a heel wrestler at her company's command but struggled to make a breakthrough. One day, her friendship with Chigusa fell apart, and she exploded with hatred for her sloppy father and anger at her unsympathetic mother and sister. She awakened as "Dump Matsumoto," the "most terrifying and evil heel wrestler, hated by all of Japan." Then, Dump Matsumoto, who formed the "Atrocious Alliance," came into conflict with Chigusa Nagayo, who had become a charismatic and popular member of the "Crush Gals," and became Chigusa's greatest enemy. Dump Matsumoto then went on to fight Chigusa in a "legendary fierce battle"—a loser-shaves-head "Hair Cutting Death Match" that will be talked about for generations to come.

==== Crush Gals ====
- Erika Karata as Chigusa Nagayo: When Chigusa Nagayo was a child, her parents disappeared due to debts, leaving her to be passed around among relatives. She joined "All Japan Women's Pro-Wrestling" alongside Kaori Matsumoto, but like her friend, she ended up falling behind. As she lived with Kaori in the dormitory, they became best friends. She had experience in karate; after using a karate technique that was banned in "All Japan Women's Pro-Wrestling" at the time, she was bullied by senior female wrestlers and decided to quit. However, Lioness Asuka, whom she had chosen as her final opponent, invited her to "do the wrestling we want to do," leading Chigusa to challenge her to a match. As a result, the two hit it off, gained recognition from the company, and formed the tag team "Crush Gals." They became popular throughout Japan, even releasing hit songs. Meanwhile, Chigusa's best friend, Kaori Matsumoto, transformed into "the most terrifying and terrible heel wrestler, hated by everyone in Japan," known as "Dump Matsumoto," and became Chigusa's biggest rival. Chigusa and Dump then faced off in what became a legendary "Hair Cutting Death Match."
- Ayame Goriki as Tomoko Kitamura, Lioness Asuka: Tomoko Kitamura joined "All Japan Women's Pro-Wrestling" alongside Matsumoto Kaori and Nagayo Chigusa. She lived in the dormitory with Kaori and Chigusa. With exceptional athletic ability and a rapid debut, Tomoko was a highly promising wrestler, earning her the nickname "Jackie Sato II." However, witnessing the bullying and toxic attitudes of her senior wrestlers, Tomoko began to feel a sense of crisis regarding the future of the company. Thinking that it would be her final match, Chigusa challenged Tomoko—who had by then changed her ring name to "Lioness Asuka." Tomoko suggested, "Let's have the match we want to have." After the bout, the two hit it off, gained the company's backing, and formed the legendary tag team the "Crush Gals." The duo even released a hit song and became mainstream pop icons throughout Japan. However, Asuka, who wanted to pursue her career purely as a wrestler, gradually began to drift apart from Chigusa, who believed that entertainment and media activities were an essential part of the Professional wrestling business. During the infamous "Hair Cutting Death Match" where Nagayo Chigusa challenged Dump Matsumoto, Asuka fought as Nagayo's second; she ultimately threw a towel into the ring to stop the match but was unable to prevent the "horrific ending." Later, in the "Dump Matsumoto Retirement Match," she gave a passionate microphone performance, asking Dump, who was trying to retire as a villain, "Is that all there is to pro wrestling for you?"—an defiance that triggered an unexpected "extra match."

=== the Atrocious Alliance ===
- Ebi chan (Marie marie) as Crane Yu, Yukari Honjo: Yukari Honjo passed the same audition as Kaori Matsumoto and later became a member of the "55-year-old group," a classmate of Kaori Matsumoto's. She lived in the same dormitory as Kaori. Before her debut, Honjo was one of the "dropouts" along with Kaori and Chigusa Nagayo. At the agency's request, she joined the heel group "Black Devil" led by Devil Masami. Then, under Devil Masami's orders, she became a masked wrestler called "Masked Yu." Unlike Kaori, who was kicked out of "Black Devil," Honjo became a heel wrestler in her own right. However, after Kaori awakened as "Dump Matsumoto," she and Kaori left "Black Devil." She then removed her mask and changed her name to "Crane Yu." She then formed "the Atrocious Alliance" with Kaori, becoming their No. 2 and facing off against Nagayo and Lioness Asuka's "Crush Gals." However, Yuu is naturally a kind-hearted person, and when she's off the ring, she gets along well with babyface wrestlers like Yukari Oomori, which causes a rift with Dump Matsumoto, who tries to be a heel even in his private life. Yuu is then expelled from "the Atrocious Alliance" after a brutal bloodbath, which could be considered punishment from Dump Matsumoto. She then reverts to her real name, Yukari Honjo, and becomes a referee for "All Japan Women's Pro-Wrestling". After the "Hair Cutting Death Match," she attended "Dump Matsumoto's Retirement Match" and participated for Dump Matsumoto and the "55-year Pro Wrestling Group." (Note: Crane Yu / Honjo Yukari in "The Queen of Villains" was created to suit the role of Ebi-chan (Marie marie), and her actions are different from the real Crane Yuu. For example, the scene in which Honjo Yukari serves as the final referee in the "Dump Matsumoto Retirement Match" never actually happened, making it a "depiction that is completely different from historical fact.")
- Momoko Hori as Bull Nakano, Keiko Nakano: Keiko Nakano was a junior wrestler with the ambition of becoming a babyface, joining Tokyo Joshi Pro Wrestling after Kaori Matsumoto and Chigusa Nagayo and others. However, as a member of the "Black Devil", she was tasked with handing over weapons to the heel wrestlers. She was generally unattractive in appearance and had a dull personality. However, when Dump decided to expel Crane Yu, she was forcibly shaved off half of her head with clippers, giving her a "one-sided mohawk." From the "Crane Yu Expulsion Match," she became Dump Matsumoto's new partner, taking the ring name "Bull Nakano," and becoming the No. 2 in "the Atrocious Alliance." She then transformed into a vicious heel wrestler wielding nunchucks in the ring. (Note: Momoko Hori, who plays Bull Nakano, actually had a one-sided mohawk hairstyle when filming "The Queen of Villains." When "The Queen of Villains" was released, it became a hot topic among viewers.) (Note: Bull Nakano in "The Queen of Villains" is a newcomer, still a young Bull Nakano. The world-famous Bull Nakano, who formed the "Gokumon Party" and is active in Japan and the United States as both a heel wrestler and a babyface, emerged after "The Queen of Villains" era.)
- Sayaka Tobe as Kahoru Kage: Kahoru Kage served as a body double for Dump Matsumoto in the "Hair Cutting Death Match." From then on, she accompanied Dump Matsumoto and "the Atrocious Alliance" until "Dump Matsumoto's Retirement Match." (Note: Kahoru Taguchi, also known as "Kahoru Kage," acted as a body double for Dump Matsumoto in the "Hair Cutting Death Match" because of her resemblance to her. She was also a relative of the "Four Matsunaga Brothers" who ran "All Japan Women's Pro-Wrestling," Takashi Matsunaga, Kunimatsu Matsunaga, and Toshikuni Matsunaga, and was a member of the "Matsunaga Clan, "As described in the Japanese Wikipedia. However, these facts were not mentioned in the story of "The Queen of Villains.")

=== Dynamite Gals ===
- Kyouka Sumida as Yukari Oomori: Yukari Oomori is one of the female wrestlers who passed the audition for "All Japan Women's Pro-Wrestling" along with Matsumoto Kaori and Nagayo Chigusa, and who lived with them in the dormitory. Along with fellow wrestler and fellow coworker Tomoko Kitamura, who would later become Lioness Asuka, she passed the professional test for female wrestlers before Kaori and Nagayo.In a match when "Chigusa Nagayo Awakened," she challenged her senior, Jumbo Hori, and Hori took a liking to her, leading to them forming a babyface tag team called "Dynamite Gals." The "Dynamite Gals" then faced off against the "Crush Gals," a team made up of Nagayo and Asuka, in numerous matches, but were overwhelmed by the popularity of the latter. Omori Yukari became a babyface wrestler, but continued to be friendly with Crane Yu, who had become a heel wrestler. Dump Matsumoto was angry about this and staged a brutal, bloody match that could be seen as punishment for Crane Yu. Omori Yukari even witnessed Crane Yu's heartbreak, and remained angry until the time of "Dump Matsumoto's retirement match." (Note: In fact, by the time Dump Matsumoto retired in 1988, his relationship with babyface wrestlers such as Yukari Omori had improved to the point that when Dump Matsumoto retired, he retired with Yukari Omori.)
- Urara Aryu as Jumbo Hori: Jumbo Hori is a beautiful wrestler who is a senior to Matsumoto Kaori and specializes in dynamic wrestling, making the most of her large physique. She takes a liking to Yukari Omori, a junior wrestler who challenged her in a match during "Chigusa Nagayo's Awakening," and they form a babyface tag team called the "Dynamite Gals." However, they were overshadowed by the popularity of "Crush Gals." (Note: Jumbo Hori was one of the contributors to the production of "The Queen of Villains." After retiring from professional wrestling, she became acquainted with Suzuki Osamu and became an employee at the izakaya run by Suzuki Osamu. When Osamu Suzuki came up with the idea of making a drama about "Dump Matsumoto's Life," Jumbo Hori contacted Dump Matsumoto to ask him to interview Dump Matsumoto. She also became one of the production staff when "The Queen of Villains" was being produced. She also provided weight-gaining meals to the actors playing female professional wrestlers in the drama "The Queen of Villains" who visited the izakaya run by Suzuki Osamu.)

=== Black Devil ===
- Ryoka Neya as Devil Masami: "Devil Masami" is a female wrestler who was a senior to Matsumoto Kaori and others in "All Japan Women's Pro-Wrestling." She is the leader of the heel unit Devil Corps "Black Devil" and is also a talented heel wrestler. She recruited Kaori and Yukari Honjo, who were instructed by the company to become heel wrestlers, into "Black Devil." Masami then taught Kaori and Honjo, "professional heels can cause bleeding with any weapon," and taught them the ways of a heel wrestler, including how to use weapons. She did not accept Kaori as a member of the Black Devils because she was too timid to be a heel wrestler. However, upon seeing Kaori/Dump Matsumoto, who had awakened as the "most vicious heel," rampage to the brink of murder, she became enraged by the stark contrast with her own heel style, expelling Dump from "Black Devil" and breaking up with him. She later served as Chigusa Nagayo's second in the "Hair Cutting Death Match" and as a second for the "Crush Gals" in "Dump Matsumoto's Retirement Match," witnessing the outcome of the "legendary match."

=== Beauty Pair ===
- Kamoshida Hiromi as Jackie Sato
- Haruka Imoo as Maki Ueda

=== Other wrestlers affiliated with All Japan Women's Pro-Wrestling ===
- Elina Mizuno as Jaguar Yokota
- Eri Kamataki as Lovely Yoneyama

=== All Japan Women's Pro Wrestling staff or related parties ===
==== The three Matsunaga brothers ====
- Jun Murakami as Takashi Matsunaga
- Daisuke Kuroda as Kunimatsu Matsunaga
- Takumi Saitoh as Toshikuni Matsunaga

==== Other people involved in All Japan Women's Pro-Wrestling ====
- Takuma Otoo as Shiro Abe
- Akapen Takigawa as Nobuo Usui
- Shigeki Kiyono as Haruo Shiono

=== Matsumoto family ===
- Atsuko Sendo as Satoko Matsumoto
- Marin Nishimoto as Hiromi Matsumoto
- Takamitsu Nonaka as Goro Matsumoto

=== Nagayo family ===
- Tomu Miyazaki as Shigeru Nagayo
- Michie as Sueko Nagayo

== Production ==
=== Pre-production ===
At the end of 2019, Osamu Suzuki, who was then a broadcast writer and staff member of the TV program "I'm a Sujigane Fan!", aired footage of the "legendary match" between Dump Matsumoto and Chigusa Nagayo, the "Hair-Cutting Death Match." At the time, Osamu Suzuki saw Nagayo Chikusa fans crying tears of frustration after watching the footage. This made him want to create a work themed around the "craze of women's professional wrestling in the 1980s."

Osamu Suzuki created a proposal with only a few pages on the cover, with a photo of Dump Matsumoto and Nagayo Chigusa's "Hair-Cutting Death Match" and the title "The Queen of Villains," and took it to Netflix. The proposal for "The Queen of Villains" was then adopted by Netflix.

=== Development ===
Takahashi Shinichi, who became the producer of this film, invited Kazuya Shiraishi, the film director behind the series "The Blood of Wolves", to direct. Kazuya Shiraishi was such a big fan of professional wrestling that he was aware of the craze of "All Japan Women's Pro-Wrestling" in the 1980s. Shiraishi was also skilled at portraying the passions deep within the human heart. Based on Shiraishi's research, it was decided that "The Queen of Villains" would be produced as a "story of fighting girls" starring Dump Matsumoto and female pro wrestlers from her generation.

=== Casting ===
All of the actors playing the female professional wrestlers, including Yuriyan Retriever, were selected through auditions.Each actor auditioned with their own determination.

All actors playing female wrestlers were required to gain approximately 10 kg of weight to build muscle. This weight-gaining method was inspired by the Netflix drama "Sanctuary." Netflix provided various support, including financial and food support, to help them gain weight. At this point, Yuriyan Retriever had successfully lost about 45 kg, but in order to play the role of Dump Matsumoto, she gained about 40 kg of muscle mass and built a strong physique.

Then, female wrestlers from "Marvelous That's Women Pro Wrestling ", led by Chigusa Nagayo, who acted as the super professional wrestling advisor for "The Queen of Villains," served as trainers, and the actors playing the female wrestlers received "pro wrestling training." The training started with bump and ropework, and progressed to learning various professional wrestling techniques, making it as rigorous as joining an actual professional wrestling organization.

Through these activities, the actors playing the female professional wrestlers developed close relationships and built friendships.

=== Filming ===
"The Queen of Villains" began filming in July 2022. Filming began primarily with the match scenes. The scenes were shot in sequence.

The professional wrestling match scenes were arranged by Chigusa Nagayo, who was appointed as a professional wrestling super advisor. And while consideration was given to the physical condition of the actors, almost all of the match scenes, 99.9 percent, were performed by the actors playing the female wrestlers, putting their bodies on the line.

Chigusa Nagayo also gave acting lessons to the actors about real-life characters from "All Japan Women's Pro-Wrestling" who she had been involved with, such as the three Matsunaga brothers and Dump Matsumoto.

The art staff for "The Queen of Villains" worked hard to recreate 1980s Japan, down to the costumes, props, All Japan Women's Pro-Wrestling building, and Dump Matsumoto's old house, to recreate the world of the film.

Thousands of extras were involved in filming the match, totalling 25,000, the largest number in Netflix history.

The production of "The Queen of Villains" required various funds. It is said that about 100 million yen was spent for each episode, and about 500 million yen was spent for the five episodes in total.

When filming a match, the actors playing female wrestlers would say to each other, "I'm off to the match." Even actors who weren't competing would go to the set and actively act as seconds. Leading actors Yuriyan Retriever, Erika Karata, and Ayame Goriki also cooperated with filming in their own ways. Yuriyan and Karata even deliberately allowed themselves a period of "bad relations," just like Dump Matsumoto and Nagayo Chigusa in the past. Thanks to the efforts of these actors, staff, and extras, realistic professional wrestling match scenes were filmed.

In October of the same year, Yuriyan Retriever failed a fall and hit her head and back. Although she was not seriously injured, she was given two weeks of complete bed rest just to be safe. After that, the girls were given approximately six months of additional wrestling training to allow for an interval. Filming of the series was suspended during that time. However, during that time, slanderous articles were published that inflamed the girls' reputations. The actors playing the female wrestlers were unable to refute these articles, which only made them more frustrated. This awakened a rebellious spirit in them, determined to show the world what they were made of by completing "The Queen of Villains."

The "Hair Cutting Death Match," the climax scene of "The Queen of Villains," was filmed over a period of about one month, with various scenes being shot. The scene in which Yuriyan Retriever, who played Dump Matsumoto, actually cuts the hair of Karata Erika, who played Nagayo Chigusa, was filmed in one take on July 7 of the same year. Yuriyan, who actually cut Karata's hair, burst into tears and her hands began to shake uncontrollably. The two people involved, Chigusa Nagayo and Dump Matsumoto, hugged each other and shed tears as they watched The "Hair Cutting Death Match".

Then, going back to that day, on a certain day in June of the same year, filming of "Dump Matsumoto's Retirement Match" took place at Korakuen Hall, the "holy ground of Japanese professional wrestling." Not only Dump Matsumoto and Nagayo Chigusa, but also female wrestlers who had previously belonged to All Japan Women's Pro Wrestling, such as Lioness Asuka, Jaguar Yokota, and Bull Nakano, gathered together. The filming was done nonstop in one long take. During the filming, the participants felt as if the entire venue had traveled back in time, as if they were actually there at that time. When filming finished, everyone involved, from the cast and staff to the extras, reportedly shed tears and stood up in applause.

The actors who played the female wrestlers used parts of their own lives to take on the "battle" of filming "The Queen of Villains," and simulated the life of a female wrestler. By the time filming finished, she had become a female professional wrestler.

Through the filming of "The Queen of Villains," Chigusa Nagayo relived and reassessed the craze of All Japan Women's Pro-Wrestling in Japan in the 1980s that she herself experienced. After filming finished, Nagayo said, "Our story, which began in that era, has finally come to an end." She also began to express her gratitude to the staff, cast, and the series itself on every occasion.

== Reception ==
Since its release, "The Queen of Villains" received a huge response from viewers. The hashtag "#極悪女王" became a trending topic on social media. "Very Evil Queen" became a hot topic in Japan.

"The Queen of Villains" reached number one on Netflix's weekly rankings in Japan during its first week of release, and remained at number one for three consecutive weeks.

== Works cited ==
- Sports graphic number：スポーツ・グラフィックナンバー 「極悪女王」 秘話。~クラッシュ・ギャルズとダンプ松本の時代~ (in Japanese). 文藝春秋. 21 November 2024. pp. 1–75, 96.
