= Ningyo-hime =

Ningyo-hime, which can mean both "Mermaid Princess" (人魚姫) or "Puppet Princess" (人形姫), may refer to:

== Songs ==
- "Ningyo Hime", a 2002 single by Rie Tanaka
- "Ningyo-hime", a 2006 single by Koda Kumi
- "Ningyo Hime", a 2015 single by Yuko Ando
- "Ningyo Hime", a 2016 song by Flower
- "Ningyo Hime", a 2016 song by Garnidelia

== TV, cinema and literature ==
- Anderusen Dōwa Ningyo Hime (or Hans Christian Andersen's The Little Mermaid), a 1975 Toei film
- Princess Daisy a character who had two separate manga appearances as a mermaid
- Ningyo Hime Marina no Bouken (or Adventures of the Little Mermaid), a 1991 Japanese/French animated series
- Ningyo Hime no Kisu, a 1996 one-shot manga by Yutaka Tanaka
- Ningyo-hime Tina, a fictional character in the 2016 anime Queen's Blade Grimoire

== Video game ==
- Māru-ōkoku no Ningyō-hime (or Marl Kingdom), a series of RPGs developed by Nippon Ichi Software
  - Māru-ōkoku no Ningyō-hime (or Rhapsody: A Musical Adventure), a 1998 tactical role-playing video game
  - Ritoru Purinsesu Māru-ōkoku no Ningyō-hime (or Little Princess: Marl Ōkoku no Ningyō Hime 2), the 1999 sequel of the aforementioned video game
