= Flower discography =

- Studio albums: 3
- Compilation albums: 1
- Singles: 15
- Music videos: 20
- Promotional singles: 3

The discography of Japanese pop girl group Flower consists of three studio albums, one compilation album, 18 singles, and 21 music videos.

== Studio albums ==
List of albums, with selected chart positions and certifications
Title	Album details	Peak positions		Certifications
Title	Album details	JPN Oricon	JPN Billboard (Note: Sources for chart positions are as follows: Hanadokei, This Is Flower This Is Best.)	Certifications
Flower	Released: January 22, 2014; Format: CD, digital download; Label: Sony Music Japan	3	— (Note: The album was released prior to the establishment of the Japan Hot Album, hence why did not enter the chart but it peaked at number 3 on the Top Album Sales chart.)	RIAJ: Gold
Hanadokei (花時計)	Released: March 4, 2015; Format: CD, digital download; Label: Sony	2	81 (Note: Released prior to the establishment of the Japan Hot Album chart.)	RIAJ: Gold
F	Released: March 27, 2019; Format: CD, digital download; Label: Sony	6		

== Compilation albums ==
List of albums, with selected chart positions and certifications
Title	Album details	Peak positions		Certifications
Title	Album details	JPN Oricon	JPN Billboard	Certifications
This Is Flower This Is Best	Released: September 14, 2016; Format: CD, digital download; Label: Sony Music Japan	1	2	RIAJ: Gold

== Singles ==
List of singles, with selected chart positions and certifications
Title	Year	Peak chart positions		Certifications	Album
Title	Year	JPN Oricon	JPN Hot (Note: Sources for chart positions are as follows: "Still", "Sakura Regret", "Forget Me Not: Wasurenagusa", "Koibito ga Santa Claus", "Taiyou to Himawari", "Hatsukoi", "Shirayukihime", "Let Go Again", "Nettaigyo no Namida", "Akikaze no Answer", "Sayonara, Alice", "Tomorrow: Shiawase no Housoku", "Blue Sky Blue", "Hitomi no Oku no Milky Way", "Yasashisa de Afureruyouni", "Hoka no Dareka Yori Kanashii Koi wo Shita Dake", "Monochrome/Colorful", "Moon Jellyfish", "Taiyou no Elegy".)	Certifications	Album
"Still"	2011	5	15		Flower
"Sakura Regret" (SAKURA リグレット)	2012	19	19		Flower
"Forget Me Not: Wasurenagusa" (forget-me-not ～ワスレナグサ～)	2012	13	25		Flower
"Koibito ga Santa Claus" (恋人がサンタクロース)	2012	10	31		Flower
"Taiyou to Himawari" (太陽と向日葵)	2013	5	7		Flower
"Shirayukihime" (白雪姫)	2013	3	5	RIAJ (digital): Gold	Flower
"Nettaigyo no Namida" (熱帯魚の涙)	2014	5	8		Hanadokei
"Akikaze no Answer" (秋風のアンサー)	2014	3	4		Hanadokei
"Tomorrow: Shiawase no Housoku" (TOMORROW～しあわせの法則～)	2015	7	28		Hanadokei
"Sayonara, Alice" (さよなら、アリス)	2015	7	7		Hanadokei
"Blue Sky Blue"	2015	6	8		This Is Flower This Is Best
"Hitomi no Oku no Milky Way" (瞳の奥の銀河(ミルキーウェイ))	2015	2	2	RIAJ (physical): Gold	This Is Flower This Is Best
"Yasashisa de Afureruyouni" (やさしさで溢れるように)	2016	2	2	RIAJ (digital): Platinum	This Is Flower This Is Best
"Monochrome" (モノクロ)	2017	2	3		F
"Colorful" (カラフル)	2017	2	17		F
"Moon Jellyfish"	2017	6	7		F
"Taiyou no Elegy" (たいようの哀悼歌)	2017	1	2		F
"Kurenai no Dress" (紅のドレス)	2019	1	22		F
"—" denotes releases that did not chart or were not released in that territory.

=== Promotional singles ===
List of promotional singles, with selected chart positions
Title	Year	Peak	Album
Title	Year	JPN Hot	Album
"Hatsukoi" (初恋, First Love)	2013	40	Flower
"Let Go Again" (featuring Verbal (M-Flo))	2014	25	Flower
"Hoka no Dareka Yori Kanashii Koi wo Shita Dake" (他の誰かより悲しい恋をしただけ)	2016	14	This Is Flower This Is Best

== Other charted songs ==
List of songs, with selected chart positions
Title	Year	Peak	Album
Title	Year	JPN Hot (Note: Sources for chart positions are as follows: "Dreamin' Together", "Ningyo Hime", "Totemo Fukai Green",)	Album
"Dreamin' Together" (featuring Little Mix)	2015	69	Hanadokei
"Ningyo Hime" (人魚姫, The Little Mermaid)	2016	61	This Is Flower This Is Best
"Totemo Fukai Green" (とても深いグリーン, Very Deep Green)	2017	82	"Moon Jellyfish" (single)

== Other appearances ==
Title	Year	Album
"Nando Demo" (何度でも)	2014	Watashi to Drecom: Dreams Come True 25th Anniversary Best Covers

== Music videos ==
Title	Year	Director
"Still"	2011	Shigeaki Kubo
"SAKURA Regret"	2012	Shigeaki Kubo
"forget-me-not: Wasurenagusa"	2012	Hiroaki Higashi
"Koibito ga Santa Claus"	2012	Shigeaki Kubo
"Taiyou to Himawari"	2013	Shigeaki Kubo
"Hatsukoi"	2013	Shigeaki Kubo
"Shirayukihime"	2013	Shigeaki Kubo
"Let Go Again" (featuring Verbal (M-Flo))	2014	Shigeaki Kubo
"Nettaigyo no Namida"	2014	Shigeaki Kubo
"Akikaze no Answer"	2014	Shigeaki Kubo
"TOMORROW: Shiawase no Housoku"	2015	—
"Sayonara, Alice"	2015	Mika Ninagawa
"Dreamin' Together" (featuring Little Mix)	2015	Shigeaki Kubo
"Blue Sky Blue"	2015	Shigeaki Kubo
"Hitomi no Oku no Milky Way"	2015	Toshiyuki Suzuki
"Yasashisa de Afureru You ni"	2016	—
"Hoka no Dareka Yori Kanashii Koi wo Shita Dake"	2016	Shigeaki Kubo
"Monochrome"	2017	Shigeaki Kubo
"MOON JELLYFISH"	2017	Toshiyuki Suzuki
"Taiyou no Elegy"	2017	Hideaki Sunaga
"Kurenai no Dress"	2019	Shigeaki Kubo
