= Tormented (2011 film) =

- Japanese poster for Tormented
- Directed by: Takashi Shimizu
- Written by: Sotaro Hayashi; Daisuke Hosaka; Takashi Shimizu
- Produced by: Satoru Ogura; Masayuki Tanishima
- Starring: Hikari Mitsushima; Takeru Shibuya; Teruyuki Kagawa
- Cinematography: Christopher Doyle
- Edited by: Zensuke Hori
- Music by: Kenji Kawai; Scandal
- Distributed by: Phantom Film
- Release date: September 7, 2011
- Running time: 83 minutes
- Country: Japan
- Language: Japanese

Tormented (ラビット・ホラー３Ｄ, rabitto horā 3D) is a 2011 Japanese horror film directed by Takashi Shimizu. The film involves Kiriko (Hikari Mitsushima) and her younger half-brother Daigo (Takeru Shibuya) who are haunted by a large rabbit-doll. Tormented premiered at the 68th Venice International Film Festival on September 7, 2011.

== Plot ==
In Japan, Kiriko (Hikari Mitsushima) and her younger half-brother Daigo (Takeru Shibuya) live with their father Kohei (Teruyuki Kagawa) who is a book illustrator. One day Daigo inexplicably beats a rabbit to death outside his school and subsequently stops attending classes. Kiriko becomes worried by Daigo's behaviour while their father ignores yes caught up in latest job: a pop-up book about The Little Mermaid. Later, Kiriko takes Daigo to watch the 3-D horror film The Shock Labyrinth involving a rabbit doll which appears to float out of the screen and into Daigo's hands. Daigo takes it home. That night a large version of the doll pulls him through a cupboard into a fairground. The next night Daigo is pulled by the rabbit through the mattress of his bed. Kiriko follows him this time and the group goes to an abandoned hospital. Later, Kiriko tells her father that "Kyoko is coming. I saw her. Daigo too." Kiriko then recalls when she was younger and Kohei brought home his pregnant second wife, Kyoko. Kiriko attacked Kyoko and now Kiriko and Daigo seem to believe that Kyoko has come back to haunt them in a rabbit costume and are determined to destroy the doll.

== Production ==
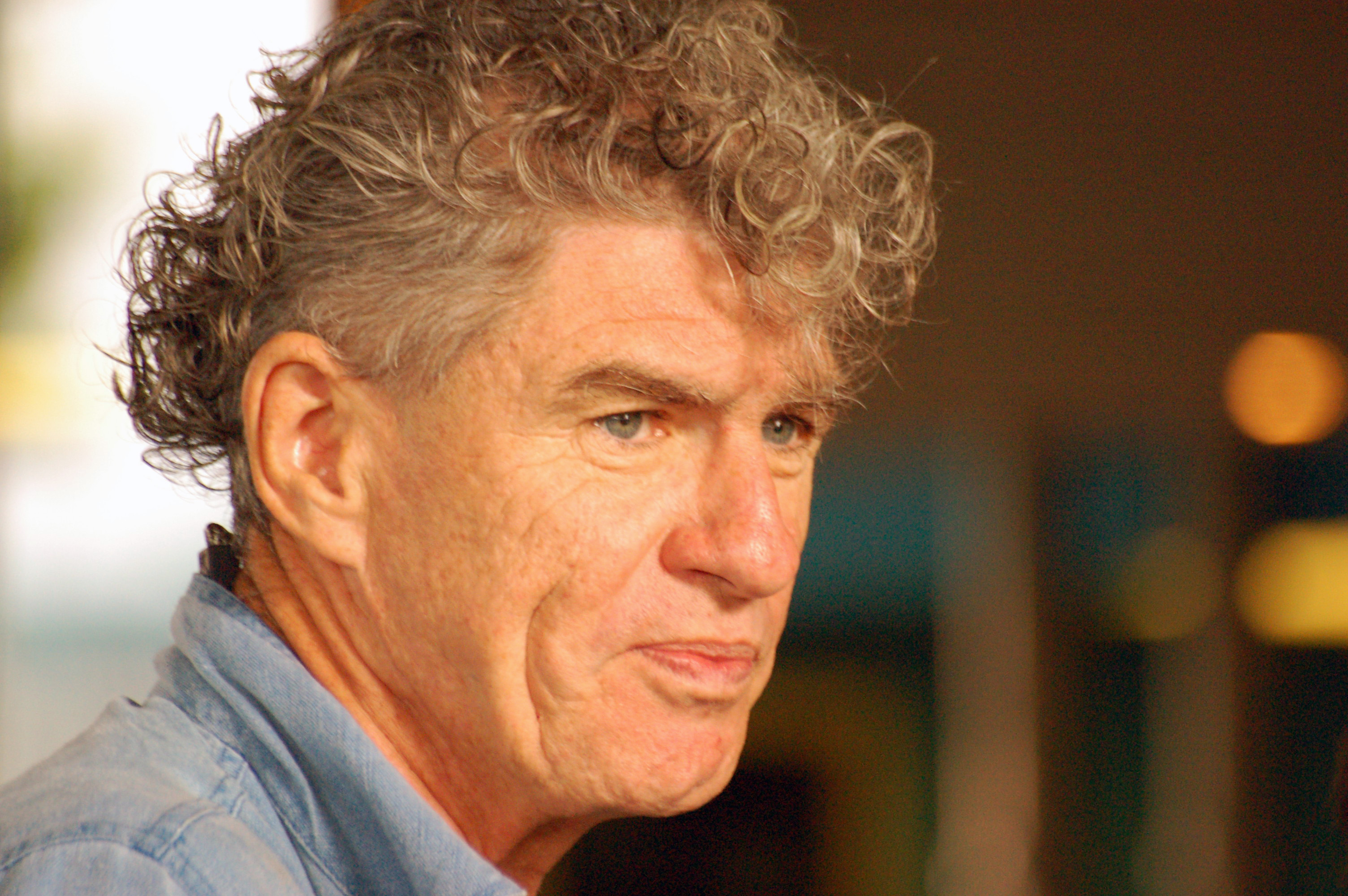
Tormented was cinematographer Christopher Doyle's first film made in 3D.

Tormented was the first film where director Takashi Shimizu had worked with cinematographer Christopher Doyle. This film was Doyle's first work in 3D. Shimizu stated that he and Doyle "clashed a lot" on set, but also that "if any one understood our intentions – or more to the point, felt them – it was probably Chris, the Troublesome but Refined Old Bastard."

== Release ==
The film was shown out of competition at the 68th Venice International Film Festival on September 7, 2011. The film was released theatrically in Japan on September 17. The film was subsequently shown in competition at the Sitges Film Festival in October and at the Stockholm International Film Festival in November.

Along with Shimizu's The Shock Labyrinth, Tormented's theatrical, DVD, digital, video on demand, and television rights have been bought by Well Go USA from Fortissimo Films.

== Reception ==
Derek Elley of Film Business Asia gave the film a six out of ten rating, noting that the film has "more atmosphere than plot" Screen Daily gave the film a favorable review praising that it made a "giant furry rabbit suit scary" and the film's use of 3D. The Japan Times gave the film a rating of two and a half out of five, praising the film's cast but they "can't overcome the View-Master diorama atmospherics." Variety gave the film a mixed review, noting that Tormented's script "lacks the extra layers of meaning and symbolism that make the best kind of horror pics so effective" while stating that the film "works perfectly adequately"
