= Pro Wrestling (Master System video game) =

1986 video game

- Developer: Sega
- Publisher: Sega
- Platform: Master System
- Release: JP: July 20, 1986; NA: December 1986; EU: August 1987
- Genre: Wrestling
- Modes: Single-player, multiplayer

Pro Wrestling, known as Gokuaku Doumei Dump Matsumoto (極悪同盟 ダンプ松本) in Japan, is a professional wrestling video game released for the Master System in 1986 by Sega. It centers around tag team wrestling, with four duos that players can select and guide to various championship titles around the world. Pro Wrestling was the only professional wrestling title released for the Master System in United States. The game has received mixed reviews, with publications criticizing the game's graphics and controls.

In Japan, the game is the home counterpart to the Sega arcade video game Dump Matsumoto (released outside Japan as Body Slam). Like the arcade game, it features female wrestler Dump Matsumoto and her stable Gokuaku Doumei. In addition to having an entirely different, all-female roster, the Japanese version also has a final hidden matchup against aliens on another planet.

== Gameplay ==
Mad Soldiers face off against the Orient Express.

Player select from one of four tag teams: the Crush Brothers (Elder and Younger Crusher), the Orient Express (Dragonfly and Giant Bull), the Mad Soldiers (Muscle Soldier and Iron Soldier) and the Great Maskmen (Green Mask and Stone Head). The player's selected tag team contests for three titles against two of the other three teams (face tag teams only face heel counterparts and vice versa) in this order: the Mexican League title in Mexico, the Pacific League title - in Hawaii and finally, the World Title in New York City. Each match is a ten-fall match up, which means that the player has to defeat the opponent in ten rounds before winning the title.

From a standing position, punches and kicks can be performed. Once the opponent is on the ground, the player has the options of performing a grappling move, whipping the opponent into the ropes or going for the pin. Grappling moves vary from ground attacks like knee drops to pinning/submission holds like the Boston crab or German suplex. Additional moves can be performed after the opponent has been whipped into the ropes. Two teams can pick up a steel chair from outside of the ring and use it as a weapon. The other two teams can only touch the chair to make it disappear; these two teams can also perform aerial maneuvers and submission moves. Continues are available for matches in the first two leagues.

A two-player mode is also available without a time limit, but there are restrictions on the match ups players can choose.

== Reception ==
Reception

Review scores
Publication	Score
AllGame	4/5
Computer and Video Games	46%
Sega Pro	81%
S: The Sega Magazine	76%

The game's attempt at imitating the spectacle of American pro wrestling was lauded, but overall the game received largely mixed reviews. Sega Pro gave it a positive review, with an 81% rating, describing it as "great fun", particularly with two players. Computer and Video Games gave the game a 46% overall rating; in its Complete Guide to Sega, they criticized the game's graphics and sound and called the control scheme "awkward".

Allgame offered a positive review, complimenting its visual style and calling the graphics "bright and cartoonish". Reviewer Jonathan Sutyak said that while the game got repetitive after a while and was not much of a challenge, it had a "good variety of moves" and was fun.

== Japanese version ==
The Japanese version, Gokuaku Doumei Dump Matsumoto is named after female professional wrestler Dump Matsumoto and her stable Gokuaku Domei. Two teams represent Gokuaku Domei: one consists of Matsumoto and Bull Nakano and the other has Condor Saito and Masked Yu. Two other teams represent the faction "Fresh Gals": team 1 are Dump's rivals the Crush Gals (Lioness Asuka and Chigusa Nagayo) and team 2 are the Jumping Bomb Angels.

Despite featuring female wrestlers exclusively, the gameplay is almost identical. Instead of just a steel chair, there are a variety of weapons for use such as the ring bell. Some graphics and music are different as well. A hidden fourth match against an extraterrestrial tag team is accessible via cheat code.

A System 16 arcade game featuring Matsumoto, simply called Dump Matsumoto, was also released by Sega in 1986. The game, known outside Japan as Body Slam, featured the same characters as the Master System game and allowed players to form custom duos composed of two members from each faction.

== See also ==
- List of licensed wrestling video games
