= Queendom (Awich album) =

Studio album by Awich
- Released: March 4, 2022
- Recorded: 2020–2021
- Length: 38:42
- Language: Japanese; English
- Label: Universal J; Universal
- Producer: Chaki Zulu; Jigg; Yzerr

Awich chronology
Partition (2020)	Queendom (2022)	United Queens (2023)

Singles from Queendom
- 1. "Gila Gila" Released: July 30, 2021; 2. "Kuchi ni Dashite" Released: August 27, 2021; 3. "Dore ni Shiyokana (I Got Options)" Released: January 28, 2022

Queendom is the major label debut album by Japanese rapper and singer Awich, released March 4, 2022, by Universal J. Primarily produced by Chaki Zulu, the album was preceded by three singles, "Gila Gila" featuring JP the Wavy and Yzerr, "Kuchi ni Dashite" and "Dore ni Shiyokana (I Got Options)". The album's title track was released as a promotional single on March 1, three days before the album's release.

== Background ==
In 2020, Awich signed a record deal with Universal Music Japan sublabel Universal J. She released her major label debut extended play Partition in August 2020.

In July 2021, she released the single "Gila Gila" featuring JP the Wavy and Yzerr. The song was her first to chart on the Billboard Japan Hot 100, debuting and peaking at number 92. In August, she released "Kuchi ni Dashite". An extended play titled Queendom was announced by Universal Japan for release on September 24, 2021, however the EP was postponed. A tour titled after the EP was also announced, with the first performance in Osaka in October 2021. A promotional advertisement of Awich was displayed in Times Square as part of the "Equal Japan" playlist by Spotify, featuring various women in the music industry.

In January 2022, Universal Japan announced Queendom would be a studio album rather than an EP. The label released the official track list and stated the album would be released in March. A third single titled "Dore ni Shiyokana (I Got Options)" was released near the end of January.

== Music and lyrics ==
Queendom features bilingual lyrics in both Japanese and English. The album's title track describes her life from leaving Okinawa to Atlanta in 2006, where she met her husband and how he was incarcerated and later murdered, leaving her as a single mother.

== Promotion ==
Awich was featured on the front cover of Quick Japan, a cultural magazine in Japan. The magazine features a special interview by Awich. Awich also performed at the Nippon Budokan on March 14, the performance titled Welcome to the Queendom. Guest performers from her former independent label, Yentown appeared along with her daughter.

Awich performed "Dore ni Shiyokana (I Got Options)" on Nippon TV's Sukiri. The live performance was broadcast on March 3.

== Commercial performance ==
Queendom debuted and peaked at number 8 on the Oricon Daily Albums chart for March 4, 2022.

== Track listing ==
All tracks produced by Chaki Zulu unless noted.

Queendom track listing
No.	Title	Writer(s)	Producer(s)	Length
1.	"Queendom"	Akiko Urasaki; Chaki Zulu		3:28
2.	"Gila Gila" (featuring JP the Wavy and Yzerr)	Urasaki; Zulu; Yzerr; JP the Wavy		4:13
3.	"Yacchi Maina (Get Em)" (featuring Anarchy)	Urasaki; Zulu; Anarchy		3:23
4.	"WheU@"	Urasaki; Zulu		2:36
5.	"Yen Bloc"	Urasaki; Zulu		2:24
6.	"Heartbreak Erotica"	Urasaki; Jigg	Jigg	3:06
7.	"Kuchi ni Dashite"	Urasaki; Zot on the Wave	Yzerr	2:25
8.	"Dore ni Shiyokana (I Got Options)"	Urasaki; Zulu		2:42
9.	"Follow Me"	Urasaki; Zulu		3:46
10.	"Revenge"	Urasaki; Zulu		3:25
11.	"Link Up" (featuring Keiju and Yellow Bucks)	Urasaki; Zulu; Keiju; Kazu Sakaguchi		3:45
12.	"Skit (Toyomi Voicemail)"			0:21
13.	"44 Bars"	Urasaki; Zulu		3:08
Total length:				38:42

Queendom bonus DVD
No.	Title	Length
1.	"Shook Shook" (music video)
2.	"Bad Bad" (music video)
3.	"Gila Gila" (music video)
4.	"Kuchini Dashite" (music video)
5.	"Yen Bloc" (Unreleased music video)
6.	"WheU@" (Unreleased music video)
7.	"Bad Bad" (2020 Summer Love Offshoot Edition with Yomi Jah)

== Charts ==
Chart performance for Queendom
Chart (2022)	Peak position
Japanese Hot Albums (Billboard Japan)	44
Japanese Albums (Oricon)	76

== Release history ==
Release history and formats for Queendom
Region	Date	Format(s)	Label	Ref.
Various	March 4, 2022	Digital download; streaming	Universal J; Universal	
Japan	March 4, 2022	CD; DVD	Universal J; Universal Japan	
