= Maco (singer) =

Japanese singer-songwriter

- Born: May 10, 1991 (age 34); Hakodate, Hokkaido, Japan
- Occupation: Singer-songwriter
- Years active: 2014–present
- Labels: Sony Music Japan
- Spouse: Unknown (m. 2022)
- Website: macoinfo.net

Maco (Japanese: マコ, Hepburn: Mako; stylized in all caps, born May 10, 1991, in Hakodate, Hokkaido) is a Japanese singer-songwriter. Initially receiving attention for a Japanese cover of Taylor Swift's "We Are Never Ever Getting Back Together", she made her debut with the cover mini-album 22 in 2014.

== Career ==
Maco released a Japanese cover of Taylor Swift's "We Are Never Ever Getting Back Together", the theme song for the Fuji TV reality show Terrace House. Adapting the song into a sad ballad, the cover received attention on social media alongside Maco's covers of other Western pop songs. In January 2014, Maco served as the opening act for Ariana Grande's first tour in Japan. She also featured on the M-Flo album Future Is Wow. When she released her cover mini-album 22 later that year, it topped the streaming chart. Her cover of "We Are Never Ever Getting Back Together" was also certified gold digitally in August 2014 by the Recording Industry Association of Japan (RIAJ).

In July 2015, Maco was selected to sing the campaign song "Shiny Stars" for the NHK Commercial Broadcasters Joint Radio Campaign in Hokkaido. Starting in 2011, the campaign selected a district each year to promote radio listening among youth. In 2015, the campaign Kitaraji (キタラジ, Kitaraji; lit. 'North Radio') was held by five stations in Hokkaido. "Shiny Stars" is a "soulful campaign song with a light melody" that was inspired by the starry sky of Maco's hometown Hakodate, Hokkaido. Later that year, Maco released "Seishun no Tsubasa" (青春の翼, 'Wings of Youth') as the theme song for the Japanese release of the film La Famille Bélier on October 31. The song was included in her first album First Kiss, released on November 4.

In December 2018, Maco announced the release of her album Koukan Nikki as December 5, as well as her tour of Japan, Taiwan, and Shanghai starting in March 2019. On August 15, 2019, Maco announced at her fan club concert Miss You Summer that she had transferred to Sony Music Japan. She released the digital single "Time Limit" on August 28. On November 16, she appeared in Taipei at the fashion event ViViNight in Taipei.

Maco left her agency Starbase in June 2024.

== Personal life ==
Maco was born on May 10, 1991, in Hakodate, Hokkaido. She has had ulcerative colitis since she was 19. Maco is close friends with Reina Washio of E-girls, collectively being referred to as "Washimaco" (わしまこ). They collaborated on the song "Dear My Friend". In October 2022, Maco announced that she had married a non-celebrity in September.
