= Reina Washio =

Japanese singer (born 1994)

- 鷲尾伶菜
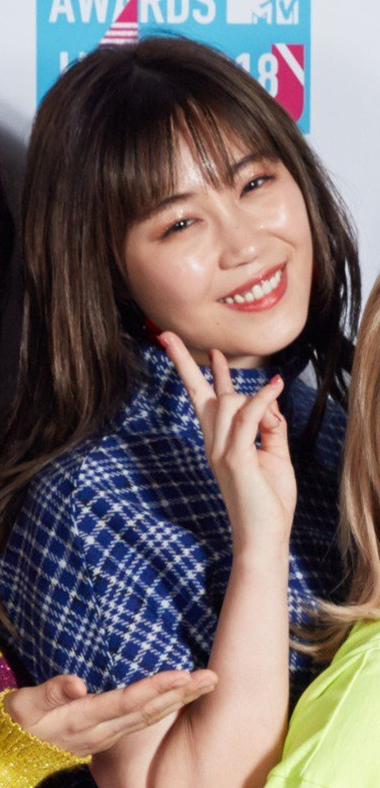
- Washio in 2018
- Born: 20 January 1994 (age 32); Karatsu, Saga Prefecture, Japan
- Other name: Rei (伶)
- Occupations: Singer, model, dancer
- Years active: 2011–present
- Agent: LDH
- Height: 160 cm (5 ft 3 in)
- Musical career
- Genres: J-pop
- Labels: Sony Music Associated (Note: Both as a member of Flower (2009–2019) and as a soloist (2020–present).); Rhythm Zone (Note: As a member of E-girls only.)
- Formerly of: Flower, E-girls

Reina Washio (鷲尾伶菜, Washio Reina; born January 20, 1994) is a Japanese singer, performer and model. She is a former member of J-Pop group E-girls and former member of Flower. Washio is represented with LDH.

== Early life ==
Reina Washio was born on January 20, 1994, in Karatsu, Saga Prefecture, Japan. Since kindergarten, she had the dream of becoming a singer. However, she did not have the confidence to sing in public and was a shy child. A changing point in her life was attending a concert from Exile at Fukuoka Dome with her mother. Washio was so impressed by their performance that after learning an EXPG (a talent school run by LDH) would open in Fukuoka, she started attending it in her first year of high school. To be able to pay the fees of EXPG Fukuoka, she worked a part-time job in Karatsu. Washio dropped out from school after her first year of high school to focus on becoming a singer. Besides Exile, Japanese singer Juju was another big musical influence during her childhood.

== Career ==
In 2011, after attending EXPG Fukuoka for two years, Washio participated in the Exile Presents Vocal Battle Audition 3 ~For Girls~ in the vocal section. On July 26, during an E-Girls Show event in Shibuya-AX, it was revealed that she was one of the winners of the Vocal Battle Audition 3 and was added to Flower as a vocalist. On that same day, she was also announced as a new member of E-girls, having a concurrent position between the group and Flower. On October 12, 2011, Washio made her debut with Flower with the single "Still".

In September 2015, she made her debut as a model in the November issue of the Japanese fashion magazine LARME. In the same year, she made her first appearance as a voice actress in the anime series Kindaichi Shonen Case Book R - Bloodless Murder Case -.

On September 20, 2019, with the announcement of Flower's disbandment set for the end of that month, Washio revealed that she would approach her new goal of solo activities while being member of E-girls. On December 22, with the announcement of E-girls' disbandment set for around the end of 2020, it was revealed that Washio would be making her solo debut.

On January 31, 2020, it was announced that she would be singing the theme song of the movie Shousetsu no Kamisama / The God of Novels, titled "Call Me Sick", and an insert song of the soundtrack titled "Konna Sekai ni Shita no wa Dare da". It was also revealed that she would be using the stage name Rei (伶) for her solo activities.

On April 13, 2022, she released her first solo album called Just Wanna Sing.

== Personal life ==
Washio has a close friendship with singer Maco and the combination of the two is called Washimaco (わしまこ). They collaborated on the song "Dear My Friend" which was released in June 2018.

Washio is also an enthusiastic gamer. She often plays cooperative video games such as Fortnite and Call of Duty together with Sandaime J Soul Brothers' Elly, The Rampage from Exile Tribe's Takahide Suzuki and Ballistik Boyz from Exile Tribe's Ryusei Kainuma. In June 2019, she traveled to California alongside Elly to participate as a guest player in the Fortnite Summer Block Party, a Pro-Am gaming tournament. There, she teamed up with BELL of Japanese pro-gaming team CRAZY Raccoon.

== Discography ==
=== Studio albums ===
List of albums, with selected details, chart positions and sales
| Title | Album details | Peak chart positions | | | Sales |
| Title | Album details | Oricon Weekly Album Chart | Oricon Daily Album Chart | Billboard Japan Hot Albums Chart | Sales |
|---|---|---|---|---|---|
| Just Wanna Sing | Released: April 13, 2022; Label: Sony Music Associated Records; Formats: CD, CD+DVD, digital download | 8 | 5 | 11 | 5,863 |
| For My Dear | Released: October 11, 2023; Label: Sony Music Associated Records; Formats: CD, 2CD+Blu-ray, digital download | 10 | — | 9 | 5,328 |

=== Extended plays ===
List of EPs, with selected details, chart positions and sales
| Title | EP details | Peak chart positions | Sales |
| Title | EP details | Oricon Weekly Album Chart | Sales |
|---|---|---|---|
| Freivor | Released: November 19, 2025; Label: LDH; Formats: CD, digital download | 34 | 1,506 |

=== Singles ===
| Title | Release date | Chart positions | | Sales (Oricon) | | Album |
| Title | Release date | Oricon Weekly Singles Chart | Billboard Japan Hot 100 | First week | Total | Album |
|---|---|---|---|---|---|---|
| "Call Me Sick" | October 2, 2020 | — (Note: "Call Me Sick" did not enter Oricon Weekly Singles Chart, but peaked at number 19 on the component Oricon Weekly Digital Singles Chart.) | — (Note: "Call Me Sick" did not enter Billboard Japan Hot 100, but peaked at number 16 on the component Billboard Japan Download Songs.) | | | Just Wanna Sing |
| "Konna Sekai ni Shita no wa Dare da" (こんな世界にしたのは誰だ) | October 2, 2020 | — | — (Note: "Konna Sekai ni Shita no wa Dare da" did not enter Billboard Japan Hot 100, but peaked at number 33 on the component Billboard Japan Download Songs.) | | | Just Wanna Sing |
| "Shirayukihime - From THE FIRST TAKE" (白雪姫) | October 14, 2020 | — | — | | | Non-album single |
| "Kimi to Nara Ii yo." (キミとならいいよ。) | June 9, 2021 | — (Note: "Kimi to Nara Ii yo." did not enter Oricon Weekly Singles Chart, but peaked at number 39 on the component Oricon Weekly Digital Singles Chart.) | — (Note: "Kimi tonara ī yo." did not enter Billboard Japan Hot 100, but peaked at number 42 on the component Billboard Japan Download Songs.) | | | Just Wanna Sing |
| "Call Me Sick - From THE FIRST TAKE" | November 16, 2021 | — | — | | | Non-album single |
| "Houseki" (feat. Lilas Ikuta) (宝石) | November 17, 2021 | — (Note: "Houseki" did not enter Oricon Weekly Singles Chart, but peaked at number 24 on the component Oricon Weekly Digital Singles Chart.) | — (Note: "Hōseki" did not enter Billboard Japan Hot 100, but peaked at number 24 on the component Billboard Japan Download Songs.) | | | Just Wanna Sing |
| "Chiru Chiru Michiru" (Note: "Chiru Chiru Michiru" is also available on the album Kino yori Akaku Asu yori Aoku - CINEMA FIGHTERS project -.) (散る散る満ちる) | November 26, 2021 | — | — (Note: "Chiru Chiru Michiru" did not enter Billboard Japan Hot 100, but peaked at number 79 on the component Billboard Japan Download Songs.) | | | Just Wanna Sing |
| "Encount" (feat. mao sasagawa) (エンカウント) | December 21, 2021 | — | — | | | Just Wanna Sing |
| "Tsuyoku Hakanai Monotachi" (feat. Tokimeki Records) (強く儚い者たち) | January 18, 2023 | — | — | | | For My Dear |
| "So Addictive" | February 15, 2023 | — (Note: "So Addictive" did not enter Oricon Weekly Singles Chart, but peaked at number 32 on the component Oricon Weekly Digital Singles Chart.) | — (Note: "So Addictive" did not enter Billboard Japan Hot 100, but peaked at number 37 on the component Billboard Japan Download Songs.) | | | For My Dear |
| "Gin'iro" (銀色) | September 15, 2023 | — | — (Note: "Gin'iro" did not enter Billboard Japan Hot 100, but peaked at number 74 on the component Billboard Japan Download Songs.) | | | For My Dear |

=== Participating work ===
| Year | Song | Artist | Album | Ref. |
|---|---|---|---|---|
| 2013 | Ano Hi no Sayonara (あの日のさよなら) | DJ Deckstream feat. Washio Reina | DECKSTREAM.JP | |
| 2014 | d.w.m | m-flo + Reina Washio | FUTURE IS WOW | |
| 2018 | Dear My Friend | MACO feat. Washio Reina | BEST LOVE MACO | |
| 2018 | How about your love? | Jay'ed & Washio Reina | UTA MONOGATARI -CINEMA FIGHTERS project- (Bonus CD) | |
| 2021 | Labyrinth | The Burning Deadwoods feat. Rei | T.B.D. | |

=== Lyrics ===
| Year | Song | Artist | Album | Ref. |
|---|---|---|---|---|
| 2019 | F | Flower | F | |

=== Tie-up ===
| Song | Tie-up | Ref. |
|---|---|---|
| Call Me Sick | theme song of the movie Shousetsu no Kamisama / The God of Novels | |
| Konna Sekai ni Shita no wa Dare da (こんな世界にしたのは誰だ) | insert song of the movie Shousetsu no Kamisama / The God of Novels | |
| So Addictive | theme song of the 2023 TX Network drama Otto wo Shakaiteki ni Massatsu suru 5-tsu no Hoho / 5 Ways to Socially Kill Your Husband | |

== Filmography ==
=== Voice acting ===
| Year | Title | Role | Network | Ref. |
|---|---|---|---|---|
| 2015 | Kindaichi Shonen Case Book R - Bloodless Murder Case - | Kaori Tengen | Yomiuri Television | |

=== Internet TV ===
| Year | Title | Network | Notes | Ref. |
|---|---|---|---|---|
| 2019 | I Fell in Love With You Today. Summer Vacation Edition / Kyo, Suki ni Narimashita. Summer Vacation | AbemaTV | Love witness | |
| 2019 | I Fell in Love With You Today. Taiwan Edition / Kyo, Suki ni Narimashita. Taiwan | AbemaTV | Love witness | |
| 2019 | I Fell in Love With You Today. Guam Edition / Kyo, Suki ni Narimashita. Guam | AbemaTV | Love witness | |
| 2019–2020 | I Fell in Love With You Today. Winter Vacation Edition / Kyo, Suki ni Narimashita. Winter Vacation | AbemaTV | Love witness | |
| 2020 | I Fell in Love With You Today. Graduation Edition / Kyo, Suki ni Narimashita. Graduation | AbemaTV | Love witness | |

=== Radio ===
| Year | Title | Station | Notes | Ref. |
|---|---|---|---|---|
| 2017–2019 | AVALON | J-WAVE | weekly navigator | |

=== Music video appearances ===
| Year | Title | Artist | Ref. |
|---|---|---|---|
| 2015 | Tomorrow (Around the World Clip) | Various artists | |

=== Live ===
| Year | Title | Artist | Ref. |
|---|---|---|---|
| 2014 | FUTURE IS WOW | m-flo | |
| 2017 | BPM ～BEST PEOPLE's MUSIC～ 1st Anniversary | Various artists | |

=== Events ===
| Year | Title | Ref. |
|---|---|---|
| 2012 | Girls Award 2012 A/W | |
| 2016 | Lawson Osaifu Ponta Nighter Tokyo Yakult Swallows vs Yomiuri Giants Opening ceremony | |

== Other work ==
- Hizen, Saga support member "Hizen saga FAN" (2018)
