= Yuriyan Retriever =

Japanese comedian, actress, singer, film director (born 1990)

- ゆりやん レトリィバァ
- Born: 吉田 有里 （Yuri Yoshida） 1 November 1990 (age 35); Yoshino, Nara, Japan
- Education: Kansai University Faculty of Letters; NSC
- Occupations: comedian; actress; hip hop artist; singer; film director
- Years active: 2013–present
- Agent: Yoshimoto Kogyo
- Known for: America's Got Talent：in 2019 and 2025
- Notable work: The Queen of Villains (Netflix); Bad Bitch Bigaku (remix)

Comedy career
- Medium: Television; Theater; Radio
- Genres: Owarai; Mandan (Japanese comedy); One-man comedy Creative Dance; Possession Art comedy
- Musical career
- Genres: Hip hop; J-pop; Comedy music
- Instrument: Vocals
- Labels: Universal Sigma; Yoshimoto Universal Tunes

Yuriyan Retriever (ゆりやん レトリィバァ, born November 1, 1990) is a Japanese comedian and actress, hip hop artist, singer, Film director from Yoshino, Nara, Japan. Her real name is Yuri Yoshida (吉田 有里, Yoshida Yuri). She is represented with Yoshimoto Kogyo.

She is known in the United States for competing on "America's Got Talent" in 2019 and 2025. And now she has moved to Los Angeles to pursue her career based in the United States.

== Life and career ==
=== 1990–2013: Early life and education ===
Yuriyan Retriever was born on November 1, 1990, in the town of Yoshino in the Nara Prefecture of Japan. Her father worked for a major railway company, often commuting from Yoshino to Osaka. She has one older sister. As a child, she was a shy and quiet girl.

During her elementary school years, she was inspired to become a comedian after seeing the performances of comedians Hanako Yamada and Tamayo Shimada. In junior high school, she began to learn English after watching the 1985 American science fiction film Back to the Future. She considered becoming an exchange student in the United States for her high school years, but decided to stay in Japan. After finishing high school, she began attending Kansai University. During her senior year of college, she enrolled in "Yoshimoto New Star Creation (NSC)", a comedy school by entertainment conglomerate Yoshimoto Kogyo.

In 2013, she graduated from the Faculty of Letters at Kansai University and simultaneously graduated at the top of her class from "Yoshimoto New Star Creation". She combined her nickname from high school, "Yuriyan," with the phrase "Golden Retriever," which was popular among her friends when she first entered NSC (Yoshimoto New Star Creation), to create her stage name, "Yuriyan Retriever."

She is equally synchronised with comedian Yūtaro Hamada and comedy duosGanbareruya, comedienne Kumamoto Pro wrestling(Benishouga).

=== 2013–2020: Career beginnings ===
In April 2013, Yuriyan Retriever began her comedy work in the Kansai region. In April 2015, she spent three months in New York for a TBS Television program. During her time in New York, she was exposed to western comedy and later incorporated it in her works.

In February 2017, she became the first female solo comedian to win the long-running "47th NHK Kamigata Manzai Contest." Later that year in December, she participated in "1st The W: The Women's Comedy Contest" which was the first one ever held. and became the first winner of this competition.

In June 2019, Yuriyan Retriever appeared on the talent show America's Got Talent. She wore a revealing swimsuit with a Stars and Stripes design, and performed a unique dance, but she was eliminated. However her appearance on the show brought her new attention in Japan.

=== 2020–2024: Expansion into various fields ===
In Japan when she became a comedian, it was common for people to make fun of women's appearances and use them as material for laughs. In 2019, she weighed 110 kg, due to poor eating habits and laziness.She didn't gain weight to be laughed at by the audience. At one point, she realized, "It's a waste to have a healthy body but not take proper care of it." She confided in her trainer, saying, "I want to change." Then, she began training with her trainer, which included dietary restrictions. In 2021, she successfully lost about 40 kg and gained a healthier body and a more positive mindset. And in the same year March, she won the R-1 Grand Prix for her "laughter that doesn't rely on her fat figure." Thus, she embarked on a path of laughter that was not based on her body shape.

She was a regular on numerous Japanese TV shows, including Knight Scoop.

In 2023, Yuriyan Retriever made a parody video of Japanese rappers Awich and Keiju's First Take performance of "Remember". She later made her musical debut on a remix of "Bad Bitch Bigaku", originally recorded by Awich, Nene, Lana and Mari.

Later, she gained weight again, including muscle mass, adding approximately 40 kg to her weight, to play the role of "Dump Matsumoto," the most hated female heel wrestler in Japan. And she underwent training to become a professional wrestler. On October 19, 2024, Netflix drama series she stars in, "The Queen of Villains" is now available on Netflix.

Influenced by the movie "Back to the Future," which she watched when she was little, she developed a desire to go to America. Then, on December 10, 2024, as part of her previously announced plan to move her base of operations to the United States, she relocated to Los Angeles.

=== 2025–present: After moving to America ===
After moving to the United States, she continued to train in stand-up comedy, but she also frequently returned to Japan. She continues to be active in Japan, appearing at various events such as comedy events and the 「Expo 2025 : Ōsaka–Kansai Banpaku」, and has even started selling her own training wear.

==== As a singer ====
In July 2025, Yuriyan Retriever signed with Universal Sigma. She released her major label single "Yuriyan Time" on July 16, 2025. In September, she released "Venus".

==== As a film director ====
On August 5, 2025, it was announced that Yuriyan's first feature film as director, "MAG MAG" (「禍禍女」, Magamaga Onna, Japanese title), will be released nationwide in Japan the following year, in 2026. On October 1st local time in Los Angeles, the world premiere of "MAG MAG" took place at the Grauman's Egyptian Theatre during "2025 the Beyond Fest" in Los Angeles. On October 2nd, it was announced that the film's release date had been set for February 6th, 2026. It was also announced that the screenplay would be written by Eisuke Naito, the music by yonkey, who also produces music for the solo artist "YURIYAN RETRIEVER," and that Sara Minami would star in the film. "MAG MAG" was officially selected and screened at 22 international film festivals around the world. Yuriyan also attended the film festival, took to the stage to give a speech and answered questions after the screening.

It has also been awarded "the Halekulani Vanguard Award" at "the 45th Hawaiʻi International Film Festival" in Hawaii, the Audience Award of “Temps O” section at "the 2025 Festival du nouveau cinéma" in Montreal, Canada, the Best Film Award in "the International Feature Film Competition" at "the 8th Monsters Fantastic Film Festival" in Italy, and the Best Picture Award at "the 2025 Golden Horse Film Festival and Awards" in Taipei, Taiwan, "NETPAC Award at the 2025 Golden Horse Film Festival and Awards(Network for the Promotion of Asian Cinema Award)"

== Filmography ==
=== Film ===
Year	Title	Role	Notes	Ref.
2021	Fortune Favors Lady Nikuko	Landlady, Cat, Customer (voice)		
2021	Spaghetti Code Love	Umeko		
2024	11 Rebels			

=== Television ===
Year	Title	Role	Notes
2013	Roke Mitsu	Herself	10 episodes
2017–2020	Vs Arashi	Herself	4 episodes
2018	Documental	Herself	
2019	Babysitter Gin!	Mimiko Shimochiai	Recurring role; 10 episodes
2019	Shirita Girl and School Boy		
2019	America's Got Talent	Herself	
2020	NHK for School: Shiritagaru to Manaboi		Mini series
2021	FM999 999 Women's Songs	Eyebrow woman	Guest role; 2 episodes
2021	Dragon Sakura	Anna Yuri (voice)	Mini series; 2 episodes
2021	The Naked Director	Police Officer	Guest role; 1 episode
2022	Is Love Sustainable?	Mikako	Mini series; 1 episode
2023	Oshi ga Joshi ni Narimashite	Motoko Kurayoshi	Recurring role; 11 episodes
2024	The Queen of Villains	Dump Matsumoto	Lead role; 5 episodes
2025	America's Got Talent	Herself	

=== Director ===
Year	Title	Notes
2025	Mag Mag	Film

== Discography ==
=== Singles ===
==== As lead artist ====
List of singles as lead artist, showing year released and album name
Title	Year	Album
"Tomodachi Shikkaku" (友達失格)	2018	Non-album singles
"Minna Mitchiri Neko Neko Nya o" (みんなみっちりねこねこにゃお) (featuring Desu Rabbits)	2018	Non-album singles
"Osaka Mon no Uta" (大阪もんのうた) (among various artists)	2018	Non-album singles
"Your Studio Land (Jibun Rashisa Irodoru Egao Saku Toki)" (Your Studio Land – 自分らしさ彩る笑顔咲くとき)	2018	Non-album singles
"Family Tune"	2021	Non-album singles
"Yuriyan Time"	2025	Non-album singles
"Venus"	2025	Non-album singles

==== As featured artist ====
List of singles as featured artist, with selected chart positions and certifications, showing year released and album name
Title	Year	Peak chart positions	Certifications	Album
Title	Year	JPN Hot (Note: Sources for chart positions are as follows: "Bad Bitch Bigaku")	Certifications	Album
"Bad Bitch Bigaku" (remix)(Awich featuring Nene, Lana, Mari, Ai, and Yuriyan Retriever)	2023	87	RIAJ: Gold (st.)	United Queens & The Union
