= Bad Bitch Bigaku =

Single by Awich, Nene, Lana and Mari

from the album The Union and the EP United Queens
- Language: Japanese; English
- Released: May 22, 2023
- Length: 4:20
- Label: And Music
- Songwriters: Awich; Nene; Lana; Mari; Chaki Zulu
- Producer: Chaki Zulu

Awich singles chronology
"Longiness" (2022)	"Bad Bitch Bigaku" (2023)

Nene singles chronology
"555" (2021)	"Bad Bitch Bigaku" (2023)

Lana singles chronology
"Makuhari" (2023)	"Bad Bitch Bigaku" (2023)

Mari singles chronology
"Bum Bum" (2021)	"Bad Bitch Bigaku" (2023)

Remix cover

Ai singles chronology
"Respect All" (2023)	"Bad Bitch Bigaku" (remix) (2023)	"Life Goes On" (2023)

Music video
- "Bad Bitch Bigaku" (remix) on YouTube

"Bad Bitch Bigaku" (Bad Bitch 美学; lit. "Bad Bitch aesthetics") is a song recorded by Japanese rappers Awich, Nene, Lana and Mari, released independently via TuneCore Japan on May 22, 2023.

Upon its release, the original version failed to enter Japanese charts while the remix version debuted at number 87 on the Billboard Japan Hot 100.

== Background and release ==
Awich previously released a remix single "Longiness" with Suglawd Familiar and Chico Carlito. The song served as the lead single of Awich's various artist compilation 098Radio, Vol. 1 featuring various Japanese rappers from Okinawa. The album was released on March 15, 2023.

On May 22, "Bad Bitch Bigaku" was released digitally. The song initially received little recognition until a live performance with a surprise appearance of Ai alongside the original four artists at the Pop Yours 2023 hip hop music festival in Japan.

On July 16, Awich teased a remix version of "Bad Bitch Bigaku" featuring Ai and an unknown artist. The remix was released two days later digitally, and the unknown artist was revealed to be Japanese comedian Yuriyan Retriever.

== Music video ==
A music video for the remix version of "Bad Bitch Bigaku" premiered on Awich's YouTube channel on July 18. Directed by Hideto Hotto, the video features references to Super Sentai.

== Personnel ==
Credits adapted from Tidal.

Original

- Awich – vocals, songwriting
- Nene – vocals, songwriting
- Lana – vocals, songwriting
- Mari – vocals, songwriting
- Chaki Zulu – composition, production

Remix

- Awich – vocals, songwriting
- Nene – vocals, songwriting
- Lana – vocals, songwriting
- Mari – vocals, songwriting
- Ai – vocals, songwriting
- Yuriyan Retriever – vocals, songwriting
- Chaki Zulu – composition, production

== Charts ==
Chart performance for "Bad Bitch Bigaku" (remix)
Chart (2023)	Peak position
Japan (Japan Hot 100)	87

== Certifications ==
Certifications for "Bad Bitch Bigaku" (remix)
Region	Certification	Certified units/sales
Streaming
Japan (RIAJ)	Gold	50,000,000^{†}
^{†} Streaming-only figures based on certification alone.

== Release history ==
Release history and formats for "Bad Bitch Bigaku"
Region	Date	Format	Version	Label	Ref.
Various	May 22, 2023	Digital download; streaming	Original	And Music	
Various	July 19, 2023	Digital download; streaming	Remix	And Music	
