= Dump Matsumoto =

Japanese professional wrestler

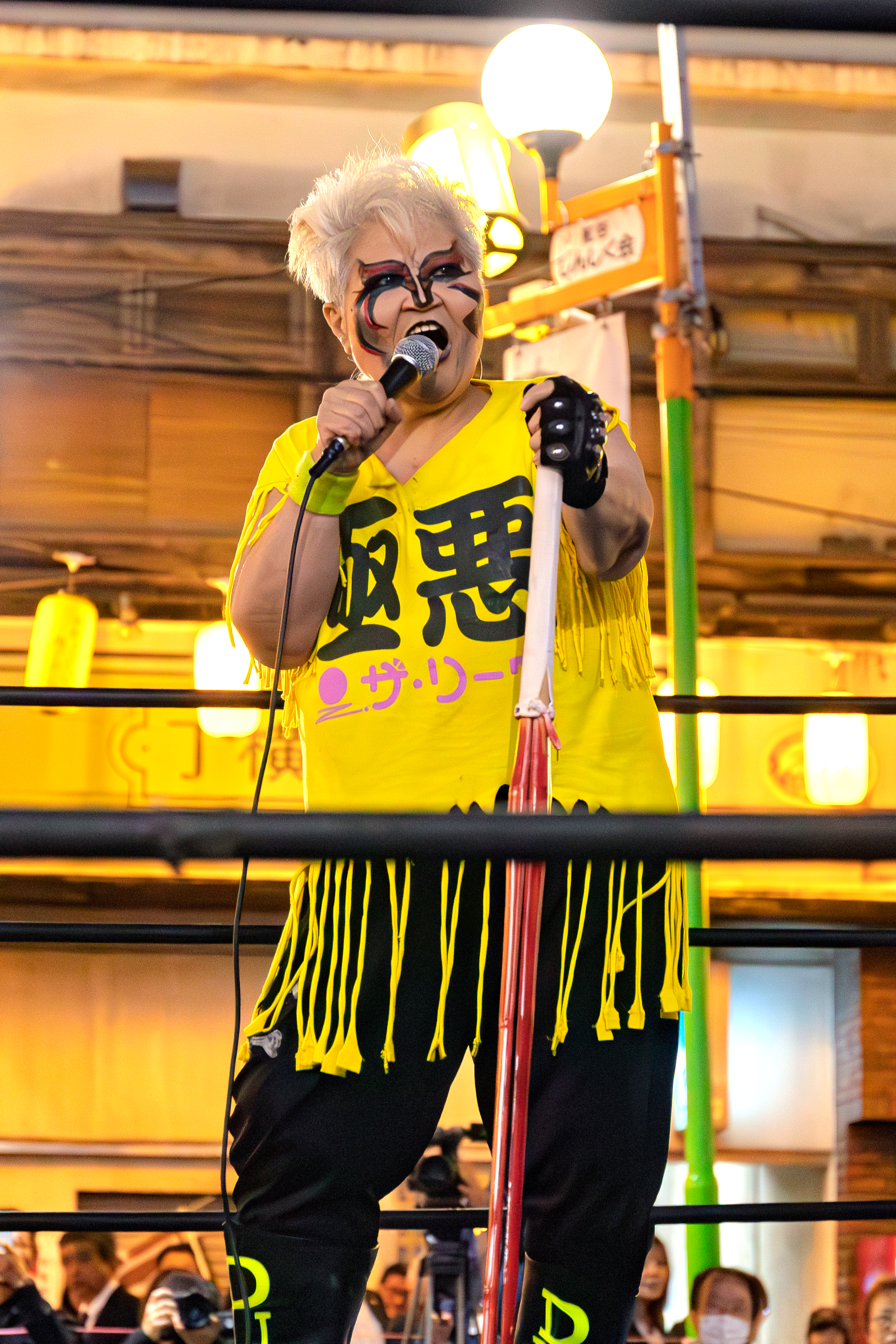
- Matsumoto in November 2025

Personal information
- Born: Kaoru Matsumoto; November 11, 1960 (age 65) Kumagaya, Saitama, Japan

Professional wrestling career
- Ring name(s): Dump Matsumoto; Kaoru Matsumoto
- Billed height: 1.63 m (5 ft 4 in)
- Billed weight: 91 kg (201 lb)
- Trained by: All Japan Women's Pro-Wrestling
- Debut: 1980

Kaoru Matsumoto (松本 香, Matsumoto Kaoru), better known by her ring name Dump Matsumoto (ダンプ松本, Danpu Matsumoto; born November 11, 1960), is a Japanese professional wrestler. She came to prominence as one of the leading female wrestlers in All Japan Women's Pro-Wrestling (AJW) during the 1980s. The longtime leader of the Atrocious Alliance stable, which included Crane Yu, Condor Saito and Bull Nakano, she was one of the main rivals of the popular tag team the Crush Gals. Their long-running feud would become extremely popular in Japan during the 1980s, with their televised matches resulting in some of the highest rated in Japanese television as well as the promotion regularly selling out arenas.

== Early life ==
Matsumoto came from poverty; She was born to a regularly unemployed alcoholic father and mother who had irregular work in the city of Kumagaya in the Saitama Prefecture. The family, which also included Matsumoto's sister Hiromi, lived in a one-room apartment and depended on her father's family for support. His family ran a farm in nearby Higashimatsuyama. Matsumoto has recalled stealing food as a child to survive. At the age of 6 years old, Matsumoto discovered her father had a child with a mistress over in Kawasaki in Kanagawa Prefecture. Matsumoto's mother ran away from the family when Matsumoto was in her fourth year of Elementary school, although Matsumoto and her sister were later reunited with her after she became a building supervisor.

Matsumoto has stated her desire to become a professional wrestler was born out of her desire to become strong enough to kill her father. Some of Matsumoto's first memories of professional wrestling are of a crying Mach Fumiake singing to the audience following an important defeat in All Japan Women's Pro-Wrestling. Inspired by Fumiake, who won the WWWA World Single Championship in 1975 at the age of 16, Matsumoto applied to become a trainee at AJW during an audition in April 1976, but was rejected. Afterwards a determined Matsumoto attended High School and took up Archery as a sport in addition to the Basketball and swimming she was already participating in. Her trainer in Archery was Hiroshi Yamamoto, who had won bronze at the 1984 Summer Olympics and would go on to win a silver at the 2004 Summer Olympics.

Matsumoto failed a second audition for AJW in 1978 but in 1979 on her third attempt, she succeeded.

== Professional wrestling career ==
=== All Japan Women's Pro-Wrestling (1980–1986) ===
Matsumoto made her debut for AJW in December 1980. She was an unremarkable rookie for the promotion until late 1982 when she joined Devil Masami's Devil Corps faction and became a villain. As part of the Devil Corps Matsumoto defeated Lioness Asuka for the AJW Championship on January 8, 1983 and held the title for almost six months before losing the title back to Asuka on June 1, 1983.

It was in January 1984 that she took the name Dump Matsumoto, supposedly because she was stocky but powerful like a Dump Truck. On the same day, she adopted the name Dump, Matsumoto dyed her hair blonde (In the context of Japan at the time, this was a major break from social norms) and donned face paint and a black leather jacket inspired by the rock band KISS. Matsumoto has claimed that, upon adopting the Dump persona, she wrote the equivalent of a suicide note to her mother explaining that Kaoru was now "dead".

During her feud with the Crush Gals, she would often team with Bull Nakano and Crane Yu, known collectively as the "Atrocious Alliance". On February 25, 1985, Matsumoto teamed with Crane Yu to defeat the Crush Gals for the WWWA World Tag Team Championship, although the two were forced to vacate the title two months later following Yu's retirement. The Crush Gals vs Atrocious Alliance feud was ultra-successful for AJW and saw all involved throw in stardom. Matches between the Crush Gals and the Atrocious Alliance would regularly attract a 12.0 rating on Fuji TV, the station AJW broadcast on in Japan. This meant that 12% of the entire viewing audience in Japan that night were viewing the match. Wrestling historians have placed the Crush Gals' popularity at this point on par with Hulk Hogan in the United States.

Throughout 1985 and 1986, Matsumoto and Chigusa Nagayo had a feud with each other that included two highly acclaimed hair vs. hair matches. Following the first hair vs hair match, in which Matsumoto defeated Nagayo and forced her to shave her head bald, approximately 500 wrestling fans surrounded Matsumoto's transport outside of the arena and assaulted her. In the same time period, a drunk fan shoved a broken glass bottle into her chest at a bar in "revenge" for Nagayo. As the feud with the Crush Gals intensified, a stalker began following Matsumoto during the summer of 1985 until he was arrested.

She later made an unsuccessful bid for the vacant WWWA World Single Championship losing to Devil Masami on December 12, 1985. She later lost to rival Chigusa Nagayo for the All Pacific Championship in Tokyo, Japan on April 5, 1986.

=== World Wrestling Federation (1986) ===
In early 1986, she and Nakano made a brief appearance in the World Wrestling Federation as The Devils of Japan, wrestling Velvet McIntyre in two separate tag team matches with Dawn Marie in Boston, Massachusetts on March 8, which they lost and with Linda Gonzales in New York City, New York on March 16, 1986, which they were victorious.

=== Return to AJW (1986–1988) ===
Once back in Japan, Matsumoto resumed her feud with the Crush Gals teaming with Bull Nakano to defeat Lioness Asuka and Kazue Nagahori (substituting for an injured Chigusa Nagayo) for the WWWA Tag Team title on August 23, 1986, however, the two would eventually be forced to vacate the title the following year. Although Matsumoto officially announced her retirement on February 25, 1988, in which she wrestled the Crush Gals in a tag team match with Yukari Ohmori and then siding against her partner by switching with Nagayo against Asuka and Ohmori, she wrestled her final match against Bull Nakano and Condor Saito on February 28 and thereafter retired.

=== Occasional appearances (1998–present) ===
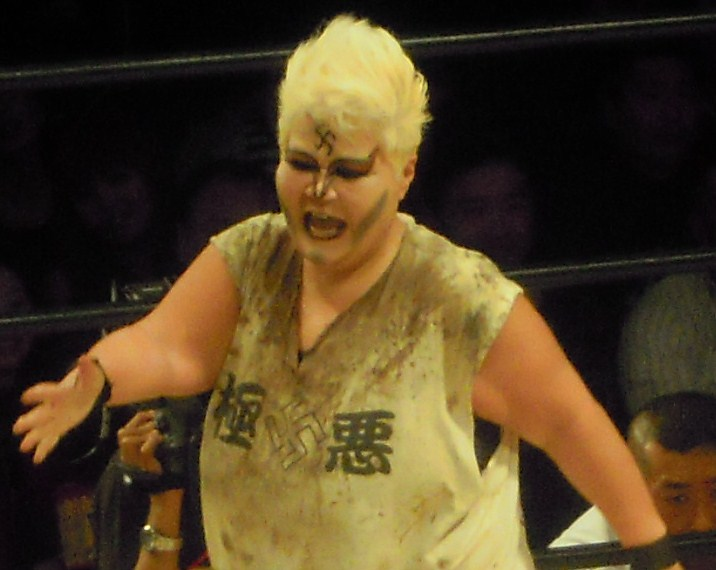
Matsumoto at Bull Nakano Final Event in January 2012

She has since appeared on several All Japan Women "legends reunions", and in August 1998, Matsumoto and Crane Yu came out of retirement wrestling in a ten-minute exhibition tag team match against Combat Toyoda and Hyper Cat. She also made several appearances for the now defunct GAEA promotion, and as recently as November 11, 2007, ran her own show under the banner of Gokuaku Domei Produce at Shinjuku FACE.

== Wrestling style and persona ==
Matsumoto, inspired by the Sukeban subculture and the rock band KISS, adopted the "Dump" persona in January 1984 which saw her become an intimidating villain clad in black leather jackets, wearing dyed blonde hair and gruesome face paint and wielding a kendo stick. This persona, which contrasted so greatly with the clean-cut image of AJW's protagonists such as the Crush Gals, saw her popularity skyrocket.

Writing in 1988, professional wrestling Journalist and historian Dave Meltzer stated

Matsumoto actually pioneered the gimmick that the Road Warriors would later use to great fame in the United States, of being face-painted bikers with bizarre haircuts and monster heels who sold very little, if at all, for the smaller, under matched baby faces. Matsumoto's impact was so great that she often brought crowds literally to tears with her villainous tactics, and when she would merely walk down the street in any major city, people would scatter in fear.

== Other media ==
Matsumoto lent her ring name and likeness to the Sega arcade video game Gokuaku Doumei Dump Matsumoto, which was released in some Western countries under the title Body Slam. The game was later ported to the Master System, but Western localized versions (renamed simply Pro Wrestling) removed her likeness and replaced the entirely female cast with male wrestlers.

Since her retirement from professional wrestling, she has appeared in a number of Japanese films during the late 1980s and early 1990s most notably portraying the character Bái Yá-Shàn in Ryoichi Ikegami and Kazuo Koike's Crying Freeman series which includes Crying Freeman 2: Shades of Death, Part 1 (1989), Crying Freeman 3: Shades of Death, Part 2 (1990) and Crying Freeman 5: Abduction in Chinatown (1992). She has also starred in Scorpion Woman Prisoner: Death Threat (1991) and Okoge (1992).

In 2024, a semi-biographical dramatized series about Matsumoto titled "The Queen of Villains" was released on Netflix. The five-part series, which began streaming on September 19, 2024, features renowned Japanese comedian Yuriyan Retriever portraying the character of Dump Matsumoto.

== Championships and accomplishments ==
- All Japan Women's Pro-Wrestling
  - AJW Championship (1 time)
  - WWWA World Tag Team Championship (2 times) – with Crane Yu (1) and Bull Nakano (1)
  - Tag League the Best (1985) – with Bull Nakano
  - AJW Hall of Fame (1998)
- Tokyo Sports
  - Topic Award (2024) shared with Bull Nakano and Mayu Iwatani
- Wrestling Observer Newsletter awards
  - Wrestling Observer Newsletter Hall of Fame (Class of 1996)

== Luchas de Apuestas record ==
Winner (wager)	Loser (wager)	Location	Event	Date	Notes
Dump Matsumoto (hair)	Chigusa Nagayo (hair)	Osaka-Jo Hall - Osaka, Japan	AJW show	August 28, 1985	
Chigusa Nagayo (hair)	Dump Matsumoto (hair)	Osaka-Jo Hall - Osaka, Japan	AJW show	November 7, 1986	
