= Elina Mizuno =

Japanese dancer and actress (born 1993)

- 水野 絵梨奈
- Born: 8 February 1993 (age 33)
- Other name: Erina Mizuno
- Occupations: Performer, actress
- Years active: 2009–2014 (as a performer); 2007–present (as an actress)
- Agent: LDH Inc.

Elina Mizuno (水野 絵梨奈, Mizuno Erina; born February 8, 1993) is a Japanese dancer and actress. She is a former member of the groups E-girls and Flower. She left both groups in 2013 in order to pursue an acting career. She was formerly the leader of Flower.

== Filmography ==
=== Movies ===
Year	Title	Role	Notes	Ref.
2009	Gelatin Silver Love	schoolgirl		
2009	Nonchan Noriben			
2009	The Shock Labyrinth			
2011	Runway Beat	Kirara Miyamoto		
2012	Lesson of the Evil	Miya Yasuhara		
2015	That’s It	Ami Nanmu		
2015	Z Island	Seira		

=== TV dramas ===
Year	Title	Role	Notes	Ref.
2009	Tantei M			
2010	Chase Kokuzei Sasatsukan	Suzuko Haruma		
2011	Beat	Tae	Television film	
2011	Kingyo Club	Kayoko Kida		
2012	Boku no Natsuyasumi	Chieko Igarashi		
2012	Piece – Kanojo no Kioku	Haruka Origuchi		
2013	The Case Files of Biblia Bookstore	Nao Kosuga		
2013	No Dropping Out: Back to School at 35	Mana Yamashita		
2014	Yoshiwara Uradoshin	Hatsune	Episode 1	
2024	The Queen of Villains	Jaguar Yokota		

=== Groups ===
Group	Years active	Position
E-girls	2011–2013	Performer
Flower	2009–2013	Performer, leader
