= Runway Beat =

- Film poster advertising Runway Beat in Japan
- Directed by: Kentarō Ōtani
- Written by: Izumi Takahashi
- Story by: Maha Harada
- Produced by: Yasuhiro Mase; Hiroaki Saito
- Starring: Koji Seto; Nanami Sakuraba; Mirei Kiritani
- Cinematography: Jun Fukumoto
- Edited by: Tsuyoshi Imai
- Music by: Tadashi Ueda
- Production companies: Shochiku; TBS
- Distributed by: Shochiku
- Release date: 19 March 2011 (Japan)
- Running time: 126 minutes
- Country: Japan
- Language: Japanese
- Box office: US$190,969

Runway Beat (Japanese: ランウェイ☆ビート, Hepburn: Ranwei bito) is a 2011 Japanese drama film. This film is based on a Japanese cellphone novel of the same name by Maha Harada. Directed by Kentarō Ōtani, this film stars actor Koji Seto and actresses Nanami Sakuraba and Mirei Kiritani. Runway Beat revolves around the theme of fashion, and it tells the story of five teenagers who organized a fashion show.

Runway Beat was first released in Japan on 19 March 2011. The film grossed a total of US$190,969 in Japan and Taiwan.

== Plot ==
Beat relocates to Tsushima, Tokyo to live with his father, with whom he had strained relations. This is because his father chose not to see Beat's mother on her deathbed, but instead chose to stay at his fashion show. Later, when Beat visits Kirara in a nearby hospital, he meets Mei.

The next day, Mei discovers that Beat will be her new classmate. On that day, however, their class was abuzz about the upcoming school festival. The class has always organized a fashion show, since the famous model Miki was in their class. Miki did not like any of her classmates' clothes designs, and threatened to cancel the fashion show. Beat decides to take up the challenge of designing something that Miki will like. Beat first overhauls Satoru's geeky image as a means to prove his ability. He succeeds, and manages to entice Miki and the rest of the class to use his fashion designs in the upcoming fashion show. Satoru also agrees to help Beat design the runway needed for the show, since Satoru is actually skilled in architectural design. The rest of the class also volunteer their services.

After Miki publicized herself wearing Beat's designs on her official blog, Beat's designs were widely praised on the internet. However, World Stage, a fashion company, simply copied the designs. They also got Miki, who had a modelling contract with them, to model the stolen designs. This action caused people to cast doubt on the originality of Beat's design, causing friction amongst the class. Beat, hurt by the lack of trust, decides to pull out of the fashion show. The class later learns that their school will be closing down after the school year ends due to the lack of funding.

Meanwhile, Kirara's doctor said that she would not live beyond another six months. Beat was extremely upset by this, and this further affected his morale. However, in preparation for this, Beat made many beautiful pajamas for Kirara. During this trying time, Beat starts to become closer to his father, after his father shows him a beautiful wedding dress that was meant for his mother. Mei also manages to persuade him to return to designing. The class's enthusiasm level rose again, and they paraded on the streets to publicize their upcoming fashion show.

Mei suddenly confessed her love to Beat one day while he was making his designs. Shocked, Beat tells her that he is not ready for a relationship yet. Beat later finds out from his father's personal assistant the reason why his father abandoned his mother. His father refused to leave the fashion show because Beat's mother told him that if the show was successful, she would also find the strength to overcome her illness. It was then that his respect for his father increased.

Before the show, the group was suddenly informed that World Stage had already booked the new event venue that they were planning to use. Miki was also told that by participating in the fashion show, she will break her contract and her future in modelling will be limited. In spite of this, however, Miki decides to continue participating in the show. The class also decided to revert to their original location, their school. It was also decided to hold the fashion show on March 20, the last day of school. With the townspeople help, they managed to prepare the stage in time for the event. Just before the event started, Beat was told that Kirara had suffered a serious infection and would have to undergo an operation.

In the end, the fashion show took place more or less smoothly. Beat also invited Mei to put on the wedding dress intended for his mother and walk with him on the runway. The crowd roared their approval, and the participants finally realized that they have the potential to excel, if given the chance. Kirara's operation was also a huge success.

== Cast ==
- Koji Seto as Biito Mizorogi, nicknamed "Beat". Son of a renowned fashion designer and grandson of a tailor, Beat has a natural talent for fashion design. Because of him, the students discover their true potential and the true meaning of life apart from the mundane routines of school. Beat later becomes a fashion designer who will hold a fashion show in the United Kingdom.
- Nanami Sakuraba as Mei Tsukamoto
- Mirei Kiritani as Miki Tachibana, a famous model for the "Sweeteen" fashion magazine. Although she is very popular, she is not passionate about modeling until she saw Beat's designs. Miki later becomes a top model, and also becomes the girlfriend of Satoru.
- Imalu as Anna Akikawa, Mei's childhood friend. Upon graduating from high school, she takes over her family's restaurant business. She also becomes a part-time deejay.
- Kei Tanaka as Satoru Inuda
- Michiko Kichise as Hayato Mizorogi's assistant. She used to like Hayato and his fashion creations. She is supportive of Beat's efforts in fashion design.
- Rikako Murakami as Miki's mother and manager.
- Atsuo Nakamura as Zenpuku Mizorogi, Beat's grandfather. He runs a tailor shop where Beat and Kirara grew up in.
- Seiichi Tanabe as Hayato Mizorogi, Beat's father. He runs a famous fashion firm that is dedicated to the teenage market. Although he used to be passionate about fashion designing, he lost the passion after Beat's mother died.
- Masaki Kaji as Tsuyoshikai Gouda
- Fujiko Kojima as Keiko Shimizu, the class representative. She is a self-conscious student who thinks that she is not suited to be in a fashion show. However, after the fashion show, she manages to become more self-confident.
- Elina Mizuno as Kirara Miyamoto, Beat's childhood friend and crush. She suffers from leukemia, and is confined to the hospital. Despite her predicament, she is still worried about Beat. She later recovers from cancer after receiving a bone marrow transplant.
- Tokuma Nishioka
- Maiko Ito as Mei's mother. She is a hairdresser, and in the words of Anna, "the town's most famous flirt".
- Natsumi Nanase
- Shun Sugata
- Miho Tsumiki
- Toru Kazama

== Production ==
=== Filming ===
Kentaro Otani decided to film the final scene of Runway Beat, a fashion show, in the 3D format. This was revealed at a pre-release publicity event on 8 February 2011. Kentaro decided to do this because he felt that "3D ... [is] perfect for fashion shows". He added that "It’s not interesting if it’s not live. When you feel like you’re standing there, you also become more attached to the characters." In a separate interview, he also said that he made the film only partially in 3D because he "realized [he] couldn’t compete with Hollywood for a feature-length 3D film."

== Release ==
Runway Beat was released in Japan on 19 March 2011 by Shochiku. On its debut weekend, it was released in 124 cinema theater in the country and grossed a total of US$179,871.

The film made its international debut in Taiwan on 17 June 2011. It was distributed there under the Chinese title of 心動舞台 (pinyin:Xīn Dòng Wǔ Tái). Runway Beat was subsequently released in Singapore on 23 February 2012 by the local distributor Golden Village Pictures. In total, the film grossed US$190,969 worldwide as of 25 February 2012.
