= This Is Flower This Is Best =

THIS IS Flower THIS IS BEST

Greatest hits album by Flower
- Released: September 14, 2016
- Language: Japanese
- Label: Sony Music Associated Records

Flower chronology
Hanadokei (2015)	THIS IS Flower THIS IS BEST (2016)

This is Flower This is Best (styled THIS IS Flower THIS IS BEST) is a greatest hits album by Japanese pop girl group Flower. It was released on September 14, 2016. It was number-one on the Oricon Weekly Albums Chart on its release, selling 87,595 copies. It was also number-one on the Billboard Japan Weekly Top Albums Sales Chart.

== Track listing ==
Disc 1
No.	Title	Length
1.	"Still" (version 2016)	4:10
2.	"SAKURAリグレット" (version 2016)	5:10
3.	"forget-me-not ～ワスレナグサ～" (version 2016)	4:51
4.	"恋人がサンタクロース" (version 2016)	4:51
5.	"太陽と向日葵" (version 2016)	4:28
6.	"白雪姫" (version 2016)	4:31
7.	"熱帯魚の涙" (version 2016)	4:43
8.	"秋風のアンサー" (version 2016)	4:49
9.	"さよなら、アリス" (version 2016)	4:48
10.	"TOMORROW ～しあわせの法則～" (version 2016)	4:03
11.	"Blue Sky Blue" (version 2016)	4:08
12.	"瞳の奥の銀河"	4:48
13.	"やさしさで溢れるように"	4:53
14.	"他の誰かより悲しい恋をしただけ"	4:41
15.	"人魚姫"	4:31

Disc 2
No.	Title	Length
1.	"CALL" (version 2016)	5:33
2.	"Boyfriend" (Moonlight Version) (version 2016)	4:39
3.	"初恋" (version 2016)	3:42
4.	"Dolphin Beach" (version 2016)	4:22
5.	"Flower Garden" (version 2016)	3:35
6.	"Clover" (version 2016)	3:59
7.	"ラッキー7"	3:15
8.	"Imagination"	3:52
9.	"Virgin Snow ～初心～"	5:31
10.	"紫陽花カレイドスコープ"	4:34
11.	"Dreamin’ Together feat.Little Mix" (version 2016)	4:55

== Charts ==
Chart (2016)	Peak position
Japan Oricon Weekly Albums Chart	1
Japan Billboard Weekly Top Albums Sales Chart	1
Japan Billboard Weekly Hot Albums	2
