= Awich =

Japanese hip hop artist (born 1986)

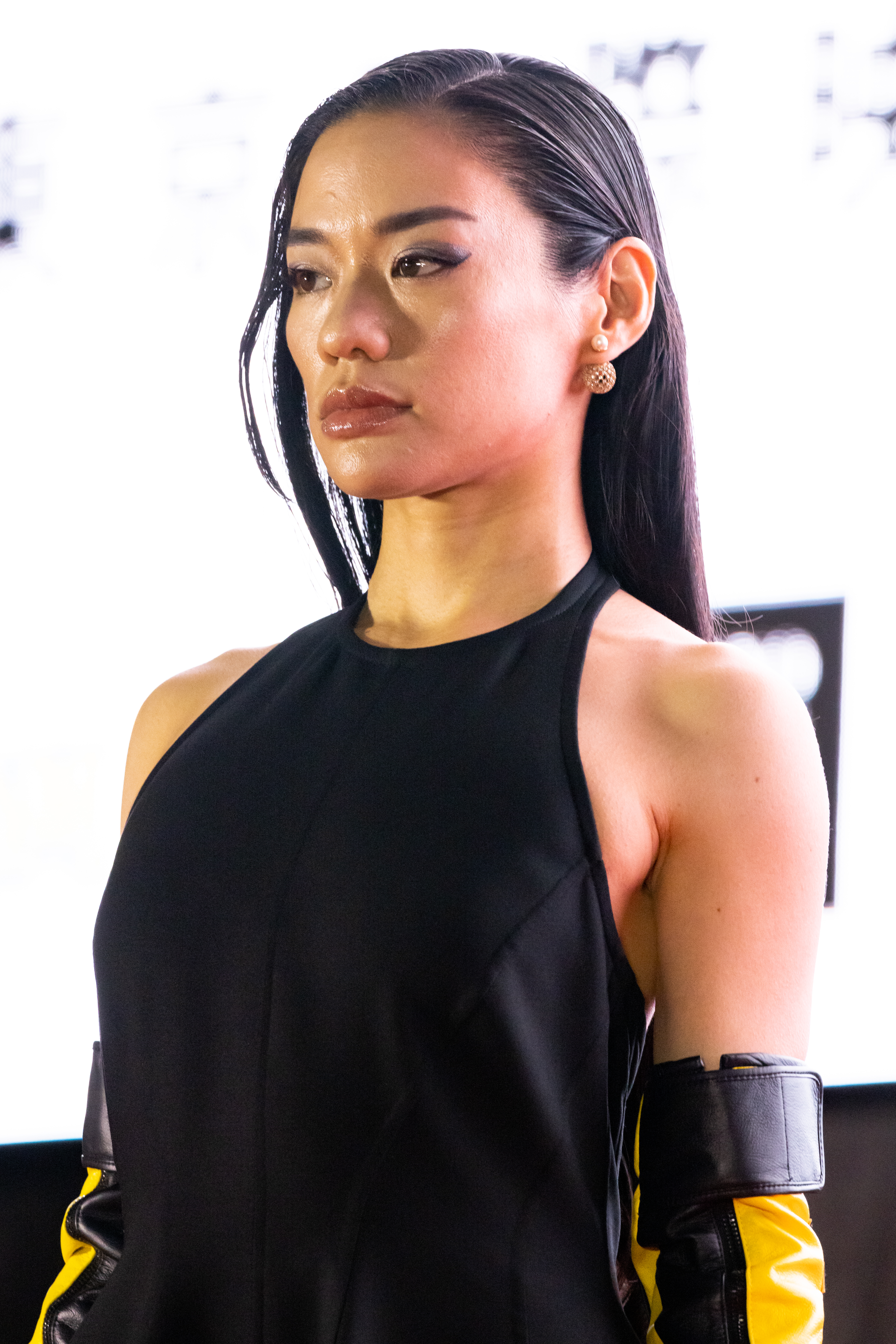
- Awich in 2022

Background information
- Born: Akiko Urasaki; December 16, 1986 (age 39); Naha, Okinawa, Japan
- Genres: Hip hop; pop rap; J-pop
- Instrument: Vocals
- Years active: 2000–present
- Labels: LD&K; Yentown; BPM Tokyo; Universal J; Empire; Kioon
- Children: 1
- Website: awich098.com

Akiko Urasaki (浦崎 亜希子; born December 16, 1986), known professionally as Awich (エイウィッチ, Eiwitchi), is a Japanese hip hop artist. She made her major label debut with Universal Music Japan in 2020. Her stage name is short for "Asian wish child," which is the literal meaning of the Japanese characters in her given name.

== Early life and education ==
Awich was born in Naha, Okinawa on December 16, 1986. Because Okinawa is home to many U.S. military bases, Awich was exposed to American culture at an early age. As a young girl, she idolized Tupac and credits Tupac songs with helping her learn English. She wrote her first lyrics at age 13, and gave her first public hip hop performance at age 14. At age 19, she moved to Atlanta, Georgia, where she met and married an American husband and gave birth to a daughter. She also earned a bachelor's degree in business and marketing from the University of Indianapolis in 2011. However, her husband was incarcerated and later was murdered after his release from prison, at which point Awich returned to Japan with her daughter.

== Career ==
Awich made her musical debut in Japan prior to her move to the United States. In 2006, she independently released an album titled Asian Wish Child.

Following her return to Japan from the United States, Awich initially focused on building up her self-founded branding company Cypher City, which works to market Okinawan products overseas. However, she soon returned to the world of hip hop music.

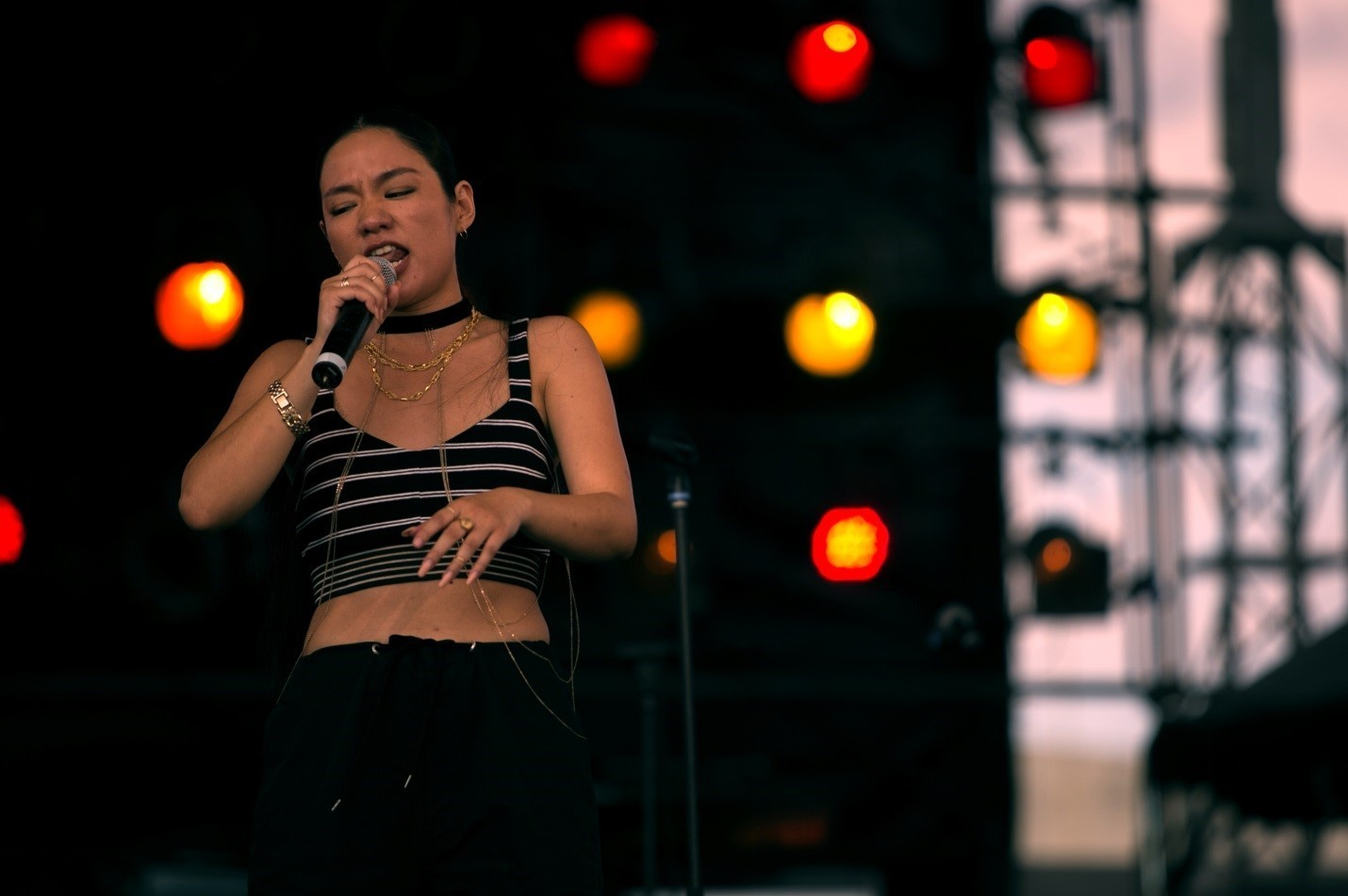
Awich opening for Shaggy in 2017

In 2017, Awich joined the Japanese hip hop collective Yentown as its only female member, and began building her mainstream career. With the label, she released two studio albums, 8 and Peacock, as well as two extended plays, Beat and Heart. In 2020, Awich signed with Universal Music Japan sublabel Universal J. Her first release under the label was Partition, her fifth extended play. Two promotional singles, "Shook Shook" and "Bad Bad" were released from the EP. Later that year, she released a cover of "Happy Xmas (War Is Over)" and an original song titled "Present". In 2021, Awich released two singles, "Gila Gila" and "Kuchi ni Dashite". Her 2007 debut album was re-released digitally by LD&K Inc in September. In March 2022, her major label debut album, Queendom was released. In May, Awich released the single "Tsubasa" to celebrate the 50th anniversary of Okinawa's return to Japanese sovereignty in 1972. The song features vocals from her daughter, Yomi.

Awich headlined at Budokan in 2022 after the release of her fourth studio album. With five studio albums (produced primarily by music producer Chaki Zulu), Awich also performed at Fuji Rock Festival in 2022. Her aim has been to become the "Queen of Japanese hiphop":

Before I knew I had the potential to be big and famous, but I didn’t have the guts to be at the center of everything. Now, I’m aiming to be the queen of Japan. Period. With that comes responsibility. It’s about owning your own words and not being afraid to be bashed for them.

In 2025, Awich, along with 4 other rappers, Krsna, Jay Park, MaSiWei, and Vannda, released the track "Asian State of Mind", which was released on 28 February, accompanied by a music video, which was shot in each of the featured rappers' home countries. She released Okinawan Wuman on November 21, 2025. The album was executive produced by RZA and features guest appearances from RZA, ASAP Ferg, Joey Badass, Mike, 454, Lupe Fiasco, Westside Gunn, R-Shitei, Nene, Chinza Dopeness, and C.O.S.A.

== Discography ==
=== Studio albums ===
List of studio albums, with selected chart positions
Title	Details	Peak chart positions	
Title	Details	JPN	JPN Hot (Note: Sources for chart positions: Peacock; Queendom; The Union)
Asian Wish Child	Release date: December 11, 2007; Formats: CD, digital download, streaming; Label: Living, Dining & Kitchen	—	—
8	Release date: August 8, 2018; Formats: CD, vinyl, digital download, streaming; Label: BPM Tokyo, Yentown	184	—
Peacock	Release date: January 11, 2020; Formats: CD, vinyl, digital download, streaming; Label: BPM Tokyo, Yentown	127	76
Queendom	Release date: March 4, 2022; Formats: CD, digital download, streaming; Label: Universal J	76	44
The Union	Release date: October 25, 2023; Formats: Digital download, streaming; Label: And Music, Empire, Kioon	25	22
Okinawan Wuman	Release date: November 21, 2025; Formats: Digital download, streaming; Label: And Music	48	— (Note: Okinawan Wuman did not enter the Billboard Japan Hot Albums chart, but peaked at number 31 on the Billboard Japan Download Albums chart.)
"—" denotes releases that did not chart or were not released in that territory.

=== Extended plays ===
List of extended plays, with selected chart positions
Title	Details	Peak chart positions	
Title	Details	JPN	JPN Hot (Note: Sources for chart positions: Partition, United Queens)
Inner Research	Release date: December 6, 2006; Formats: CD; Label: Cipher City	—	—
Two	Release date: April 8, 2014; Formats: Digital download; Label: Village Again/Siesta	—	—
Beat	Release date: September 27, 2018; Formats: Digital download, streaming; Label: BPM Tokyo, Yentown	— (Note: Beat did not enter the Oricon Albums chart, but peaked at number 14 on the Oricon Digital Albums chart.)	—
Heart	Release date: September 27, 2018; Formats: Digital download, streaming; Label: BPM Tokyo, Yentown	— (Note: Heart did not enter the Oricon Albums chart, but peaked at number 17 on the Oricon Digital Albums chart.)	—
Partition	Release date: August 21, 2020; Formats: CD, digital download, streaming; Label: Universal J	174	60
United Queens	Release date: August 9, 2023; Formats: Digital download, streaming; Label: And Music	— (Note: United Queens did not enter the Oricon Albums chart, but peaked at number 25 on the Oricon Digital Albums chart.)	69
"—" denotes items that did not chart or items that were ineligible to chart because no physical edition was released.

=== Singles ===
List of singles as lead artist, showing year released, with selected chart positions and album name
Title	Year	Peak chart positions	Certifications	Album
Title	Year	JPN Hot (Note: Sources for chart positions are as follows: "Gila Gila", "Longiness Remix", "Bad Bitch Bigaku")	Certifications	Album
"Dedicate to You"	2006	—		Inner Research
"Radio" (with Manami)	2015	—		Non-album singles
"Remember" (featuring Young Juju)	2017	—		Non-album singles
"What You Want" (featuring Io)	2018	—		Non-album singles
"Happy X-mas (War Is Over)"	2020	—		Non-album singles
"Present"	2020	—		Non-album singles
"Gila Gila" (featuring JP the Wavy and Yzerr)	2021	92	RIAJ: Platinum (st.)	Queendom
"Kuchi ni Dashite" (口に出して)	2021	— (Note: "Kuchini Dashite" did not enter Billboard Japan Hot 100 chart, but peaked at number 4 on Billboard Japan Heatseekers songs chart.)		Queendom
"Dore ni Shiyokana (I Got Options)" (どれにしようかな)	2022	— (Note: "Doreni Shiyokana (I Got Options)" did not enter Billboard Japan Hot 100 chart, but peaked at number 6 on Billboard Japan Heatseekers songs chart.)		Queendom
"Tsubasa" (featuring Yomi Jah)	2022	—		Non-album singles
"Longiness (remix)" (with Suglawd Familiar and Chico Carlito)	2022	72		Non-album singles
"Bad Bitch Bigaku" (with Nene, Lana and Mari or remix featuring Ai and Yuriyan Retriever)	2023	87	RIAJ: Gold (st.)	United Queens & The Union
"Pendulum"	2023	—		The Union
"Kakurembo" (かくれんぼ)	2023	—		The Union
"Are You Serious?"	2024	—		Non-album singles
"Hot Topic"	2024	—		Non-album singles
"Frontiers"	2025	—		Non-album singles
"Asian State of Mind"	2025	—		Non-album singles
"Butcher Shop" (featuring ASAP Ferg)	2025	—		Okinawan Wuman
"Wax On Wax Off" (with ASAP Ferg and Lupe Fiasco)	2025	—		Okinawan Wuman
"Golden Horizon" (黄金の彼方) (with ALI)	2025	—		Non-album singles
"—" denotes items that did not chart.

==== As a featured artist ====
List of singles as featured artist, showing year released and album name
Title	Year	Album
"Foo Fool Boy" (Mighty Crown featuring Awich)	2017	Non-album single
"Loca" (Anarchy featuring Awich)	2019	The King
"Money Shot" (Run the Floor featuring Awich and Kzm)	2019	Non-album single
"I'm on Fire" (Garena Free Fire & Trap featuring Awich, Krawk and Farus Feet)	2019	Non-album single
"Promise" (Anarchy featuring Awich)	2020	Non-album single
"Calma Bro" (Kraw featuring Awich & Blakbone)	2020	Non-album single
"Aligator / FND Airlines" (Tymek featuring Awich and Fresh N Dope)	2020	Airlines
"Not So Different" (Ai featuring Awich)	2020	It's All Me, Vol. 2
"Hazeru Shinzo" (Kirinji featuring Awich)	2021	Crepuscular
"098" (KM featuring Awich)	2021	Non-album single
"Neon" (Vigorman featuring Awich)	2023	Non-album single
"Woke Up Remixx" (XG featuring Jay Park, OZworld, AZLO, Paloalto, VERBAL, Awich, Tak, Dok2)	2024	Non-album single

==== Promotional singles ====
List of promotional singles, showing year released and album name
Title	Year	Album
"Shook Shook"	2020	Partition
"Bad Bad"	2020	Partition
"Queendom"	2022	Queendom
