= The Shock Labyrinth =

- Directed by: Takashi Shimizu
- Written by: Daisuke Hosaka
- Produced by: Dai Miyazaki; Satoru Ogura; Masayuki Tanishima
- Starring: Yūya Yagira; Ai Maeda; Suzuki Matsuo; Misako Renbutsu; Shoichiro Masumoto; Ryo Katsuji; Erina Mizuno
- Production company: Fortissimo Films
- Distributed by: Asmik Ace
- Release date: October 17, 2009
- Running time: 95 minutes
- Country: Japan
- Language: Japanese

The Shock Labyrinth (戦慄迷宮) is a 2009 Japanese film directed by Takashi Shimizu. The theme song is called "CLONE" and is performed by Straightener. The film was inspired by Fuji-Q High Land’s famous “Labyrinth of Horrors” haunted house ride, and was shot at night in the amusement park.

== Synopsis ==
A group of teenagers must deal with the return of a friend who had been missing for a decade, and was presumed dead. After the friend, Yuki, falls ill, they take her to a hospital, only to become trapped in a terrifying labyrinth.

== Cast ==
- Yūya Yagira as Ken
- Misako Renbutsu as Yuki
- Ryo Katsuji as Motoko
- Ai Maeda as Rin
- Suzuki Matsuo
- Elina Mizuno as Miyu
