= Flower (Japanese group) =

Japanese pop girl group (2009–2019)

- Origin: Japan
- Genres: J-pop
- Years active: 2009–2019
- Labels: Sony Music Japan (2009–2019); LDH
- Past members: Manami Shigetome; Reina Washio; Nozomi Bando; Harumi Sato; Mio Nakajima; Elina Mizuno; Chiharu Muto; Kyoka Ichiki; Shuuka Fujii
- Website: flower-ldh.jp

Flower was a Japanese pop girl group formed and managed by LDH from 2009 to 2019 and signed to the record label Sony Music Japan. They were a dance and vocal unit of collective girl group E-girls alongside Happiness, Dream and three other original E-girls members. The group consisted of one vocalist and four performers at the time of their disbandment.

== History ==
Flower was formed firstly as a performance group, with LDH recruiting four EXPG (Exile Professional Gym) students: Elina Mizuno, Manami Shigetome, Mio Nakajima, and Shuuka Fujii in 2009. They began appearing in Exile music videos and started modeling, before gaining popularity as backup dancers on tour for Exile. On April 24, 2011, E-girls, (EXILE Girls) was formed as a joint project featuring Dream, Happiness, and Flower, but while the other two groups had vocalists, Flower only performed as a dance act at E-girls' shows, but in May 2011, vocalists were added.

As a 9-member group, Flower released their debut single, "Still", on October 12, 2011. The single charted at number 5 during the first week of release, and remained on the chart for several weeks. In November 2011, all members of Flower were confirmed to be joining the collective group E-girls. Flower continued to release several singles throughout 2012 alongside promoting as members of E-girls.

Leader Elina Mizuno left in 2013.

=== 2014: Debut album Flower and Chiharu's departure ===
The group's self-titled first album was released on January 22, 2014.

On January 25, Manami Shigetome and Chiharu Muto were invited to meet British girl group Little Mix prior to their first performance in Japan. They exchanged albums and talked about the possibility of a future collaboration.

On June 11, Flower released their 7th single "Nettaigyo no Namida" (熱帯魚の涙; Tears of a Tropical Fish).

On August 20, the group participated in the VERBAL Presents OTO_MATSURI 2014 × m-flo TOUR “FUTURE IS WOW” Special Final at Yoyogi National Stadium.

On October 12, Chiharu Muto officially announced her withdrawal from both E-girls and Flower, deciding to study abroad. Shortly after, on November 12, the group released their 8th single, "Akikaze no Answer" (秋風のアンサー; Answer of the Autumn Wind), being the last single to include Chiharu. The title track was chosen as the theme song for the Nippon TV drama Binta!~ Bengoshi jimu-in Minowa ga ai de Kaiketsu Shimasu ~ (ビンタ！～弁護士事務員ミノワが愛で解決します～) which stars Exile's Matsu in its leading role.

In December 2014, LDH announced that Flower would be releasing their 9th single, "Sayonara, Alice / TOMORROW ~Shiawase no Housoku~" (さよなら、アリス / TOMORROW ～しあわせの法則～; Sayonara, Alice / TOMORROW ~Law of Happiness~) on February 18, 2015. This would be Flower's first double A-side single, and also their first single without Chiharu, as a 7-member group. Additionally, "TOMORROW ~Shiawase no Housoku~" is a cover of the song "Tomorrow" from the musical Annie and was used as the theme song for the Japanese release of the American movie Annie from 2014.

=== 2015: Second album Hanadokei, first tour and Kyoka's departure ===
On February 3, 2015. Flower announced the release of their second album, Hanadokei (花時計) to be released on March 4, less than a month after the release of their double A-side single "Sayonara, Alice / Tomorrow Tomorrow: Shiawase no Hosoku".

On February 14, during the first day of E-girls' second tour COLORFUL WORLD, Flower's first live tour Flower LIVE TOUR 2015 "Hanadokei" was announced to be held in 5 cities starting in June.

On February 24, Flower and Little Mix's collaboration song "Dreamin' Together" (Flower feat. Little Mix) was released. The song was created after both groups reunited in summer 2014 and nominated in the category "Best Collaboration" at the MTV VMAJ 2015.

The group released their 10th single "Blue Sky Blue" on April 29, 2015. The title song was chosen as the commercial song for KOSE's new mascara product, with the CM titled Facio E-girls Demonstration Live (ファシオE-girls実証ライブ) featuring 11 E-girls members.

On October 7, Kyoka Ichiki announced her departure from both Flower and E-girls. In her graduation message she wrote that she wanted to follow different paths.

The group released their 11th single "Hitomi no Oku no Milky Way" (瞳の奥の銀河(ミルキーウェイ); The Milky Way in Your Eyes) on December 16 as their first release as a 6-member group. The song was used as the ending theme for the anime Kindaichi Case Files (R): Season 2, for which member Reina Washio dubs a character. Flower also held a row of live performances titled Flower Gathering Winter 2015 (Flower 花の集い ～2015冬～) to promote the release of this single.

=== 2016: First best album THIS IS Flower THIS IS BEST and second tour ===
On June 1, the group released their 12th single "Yasashisa de Afureru You ni" (やさしさで溢れるように; Like It's Overflowing with Kindness), a cover of singer JUJU and used for the movie Shokubutsu Zukan ~Unmei no Koi, Hiroimashita~, in which their label mate Takanori Iwata from Exile/Sandaime J Soul Brothers plays the leading role.

On July 6, it was announced during E-girls' third tour E-girls LIVE TOUR 2016 "E.G. SMILE" concert in Aichi that the group would be releasing their first best album THIS IS Flower THIS IS BEST on September 14.

On August 8, the group announced their second tour Flower Theater 2016 ~THIS IS Flower~ during the encore of E-girls' last day of the E.G. SMILE tour. Flower's second tour would start on October 21 and ended on December 21.

On August 30, Flower released a music video for their song "Hoka no Dareka Yori Kanashii Koi wo Shita Dake" (他の誰かより悲しい恋をしただけ; Only More Sad Love for Somebody Else) as promotion for the upcoming release of their first best album THIS IS Flower THIS IS BEST on September 14. Over 88.000 copies of the album were sold in the first week of its release, making it Flower's first album to top Oricon's weekly album charts since their debut.

On October 18, it was revealed on Shuukan EXILE that the group would be releasing their 13th single "Monochro / Colorful" on January 11, 2017. It would be the group's second double A-side single.

=== 2017–2018: Singles and Shuuka's retirement ===
On January 11, 2017, the group released their 13th single "Monochro / Colorful".

On March 8, 2017, the group announced they would be releasing their 14th single "MOON JELLYFISH" on April 26. In the same month, they performed at the COUNT DOWN TV GIRLS FES supported by d hits / d point, a live event for female artists by TBS.

On June 6, 2017, the title track of Flower's 15th single, "Taiyou no Elegy" (たいようの哀悼歌(エレジー); Elegy of the Sun), was used as the ending theme for the anime adaptation of Altair: A Record of Battles. The song's CD single went on sale on August 23, 2017. It sold over 58.000 copies in the first week of its release and became Flower's first #1 single on Oricon's weekly single chart since their debut.

On October 22, 2017, Shuuka Fujii posted a message on E.G.family mobile reporting that she got diagnosed with cervical spinal disc herniation and that she will be halting her activities for a while to recover. On December 31, 2017, she officially announced her departure from the group and retirement from the entertainment industry due to worsening symptoms of her injuries that would take time to heal.

=== 2019: Third album F, E.G.family's first tour and disbandment ===
On January 23, 2019, Flower released their new digital single, "Kurenai no Dress" (紅のドレス; Crimson Dress). This would be their first single as a 5-member group.

The group also participated in E.G.family's first tour E.G.POWER 2019 ~POWER to the DOME~ that went from February 22 to May 18, 2019.

On March 27, they released their third album F.

On September 20, it was announced that member Mio is pregnant, would marry soccer player Cayman Togashi (FC Machida Zelvia) and thus would retire from the entertainment industry within the rest of the year. After talks between the Flower members and the staff of LDH in light of Mio's retirement, it was decided that the group would disband at the end of the same month. The other former Flower members would start their solo careers managed by LDH. On September 30, all Flower members posted messages on their personal Instagram accounts, thanking their fans and the other members, promising their continuing support for each other and showing excitement for their future.

On October 1, the group's social media accounts were deleted and its official profile was removed from LDH's website.

== Members ==
=== Final line-up ===
- Manami Shigetome
- Reina Washio
- Mio Nakajima
- Harumi Sato
- Nozomi Bando

=== Former members ===
- Elina Mizuno
- Chiharu Muto
- Kyoka Ichiki
- Shuuka Fujii

== Discography ==
=== Singles ===
Number	Release	Title	Oricon Chart	Ref.
1st	October 12, 2011	"Still"	5	
2nd	February 29, 2012	"SAKURA Regret" (SAKURAリグレット)	12	
3rd	August 22, 2012	"forget-me-not 〜Wasurenagusa〜" (forget-me-not 〜ワスレナグサ〜)	13	
4th	November 28, 2012	"Koibito ga Santa Claus" (恋人がサンタクロース)	10	
5th	August 7, 2013	"Taiyō to Himawari" (太陽と向日葵)	5	
6th	December 25, 2013	"Shirayukihime" (白雪姫)	3	
7th	June 11, 2014	"Nettaigyo no Namida" (熱帯魚の涙)	5	
8th	November 12, 2014	"Akikaze no Answer" (秋風のアンサー)	3	
9th	February 18, 2015	"Sayonara Alice" (さよなら、アリス) "TOMORROW 〜Shiawase no Housoku〜" (TOMORROW 〜しあわせの法則〜)	7	
10th	April 29, 2015	"Blue Sky Blue"	6	
11th	December 16, 2015	"Hitomi no Oku no Milkyway" (瞳の奥の銀河)	2	
12th	June 1, 2016	"Yasashisa de Afureru yōni" (やさしさで溢れるように)	2	
13th	January 11, 2017	"Monochrome" (モノクロ) "Colorful" (カラフル)	2	
14th	April 26, 2017	"MOON JELLYFISH"	6	
15th	August 23, 2017	"Taiyō no Elegy" (たいようの哀悼歌)	1	
16th	January 23, 2019	"Kurenai no Dress" (紅のドレス)	Digital Download Only	

=== Studio albums ===
Number	Release	Title	Oricon Chart	Ref.
1st	January 22, 2014	Flower	3	
2nd	March 4, 2015	Hanadokei (花時計)	2	
3rd	March 27, 2019	F	6	

=== Compilation albums ===
Number	Release	Title	Oricon Chart	Ref.
1st	September 14, 2016	THIS IS Flower THIS IS BEST	1	

=== Participating works ===
Year	Song	Artist	Album	Ref.
2013	"Hatsukoi (First Love)"	E-girls	Single Gomennasai no Kissing You	
2014	"Nandodemo"	Dreams Come True	Watashi to Dream Come -DREAMS COME TRUE 25th ANNIVERSARY BEST COVERS-	

== Tours ==
Year	Period	Title
2015	from June 5 to July 10	Flower LIVE TOUR 2015 "Hanadokei"
2016 - 2017	from October 21, 2016 to January 16, 2017	Flower Theater 2016 ~THIS IS Flower~
