= List of Japanese films of 2016 =

A list of Japanese films that were first released in 2016.

== Highest-grossing films ==
The following is a list of the 10 highest-grossing Japanese films at the Japanese box office during 2016.

| Rank | Title | Gross |
|---|---|---|
| 1 | Your Name | ¥21.32 billion (US$182.2 million) |
| 2 | Shin Godzilla | ¥8.11 billion (US$69.3 million) |
| 3 | Detective Conan: The Darkest Nightmare | ¥6.33 billion (US$54.1 million) |
| 4 | Yo-kai Watch: Enma Daiō to Itsutsu no Monogatari da Nyan! | ¥5.53 billion (US$47.3 million) |
| 5 | One Piece Film: Gold | ¥5.20 billion (US$44.4 million) |
| 6 | Nobunaga Concerto: The Movie | ¥4.61 billion (US$42.6 million) |
| 7 | Doraemon: Nobita and the Birth of Japan 2016 | ¥4.12 billion (US$58.4 million) |
| 8 | Assassination Classroom: Graduation | ¥3.52 billion (US$32.6 million) |
| 9 | Orange | ¥3.25 billion (US$28.2 million) |
| 10 | Girls und Panzer der Film | ¥2.40 billion (US$22.9 million) |

== Film releases ==
=== January – March ===
| Opening | | Title | Director | Cast | Ref(s) |
|---|---|---|---|---|---|
| J A N U A R Y | 8 | Kizumonogatari Part 1: Tekketsu | Tatsuya Oishi | Hiroshi Kamiya, Maaya Sakamoto, Yui Horie, Takahiro Sakurai, Miyu Irino, Masashi Ebara | |
| J A N U A R Y | 8 | Garakowa: Restore the World | Masashi Ishihama | Yumiri Hanamori, Ayane Sakura, Risa Taneda | |
| J A N U A R Y | 8 | Jinsei no Yakusoku | Kan Ishibashi | Yutaka Takenouchi, Yōsuke Eguchi, Tori Matsuzaka, Yūka | |
| J A N U A R Y | 9 | King of Prism Series | Masakazu Hishida | Tetsuya Kakihara, Tomoaki Maeno, Toshiki Masuda, Shinichiro Miki | |
| J A N U A R Y | 9 | Pink and Gray | Isao Yukisada | Yuto Nakajima, Masaki Suda, Kaho, Yukino Kishii | |
| J A N U A R Y | 22 | Persona 3 The Movie: No. 4, Winter of Rebirth | Tomohisa Taguchi | Akira Ishida, Megumi Toyoguchi, Kōsuke Toriumi, Rie Tanaka | |
| J A N U A R Y | 22 | Nobunaga Concerto | Hiroaki Matsuyama | Shun Oguri, Kō Shibasaki, Osamu Mukai, Takayuki Yamada, Kiko Mizuhara, Arata Furuta | |
| J A N U A R Y | 29 | Dangerous Cops: Final 5 Days | Toru Murakawa | Hiroshi Tachi, Kyōhei Shibata, Atsuko Asano, Tōru Nakamura | |
| J A N U A R Y | 29 | The Inerasable | Yoshihiro Nakamura | Yūko Takeuchi, Ai Hashimoto, Kentaro Sakaguchi, Kenichi Takitō | |
| F E B R U A R Y | 6 | New Initial D the Movie Legend 3: Dream | Masamitsu Hidaka, Tomohito Naka | Mamoru Miyano, Hiroaki Hirata, Maaya Uchida, Hiroshi Tsuchida | |
| F E B R U A R Y | 12 | selector destructed WIXOSS | Takuya Satō | Ai Kakuma, Ayane Sakura, Ai Kayano, Chinatsu Akasaki | |
| F E B R U A R Y | 12 | Lychee Light Club | Eisuke Naito | Shuhei Nomura, Yuki Furukawa, Shotaro Mamiya, Ayami Nakajo | |
| F E B R U A R Y | 12 | Children of Iron | Koki Fukuyama | Tomoko Tobata, Jyonmyon Pe, Taishi Sato, Mau Konishi | |
| F E B R U A R Y | 26 | Defying Kurosaki-kun | Sho Tsukikawa | Kento Nakajima, Nana Komatsu, Yudai Chiba, Sara Takatsuki | |
| F E B R U A R Y | 27 | Tantei Opera Milky Holmes the Movie: Milky Holmes' Counterattack | Hiroaki Sakurai | Suzuko Mimori, Sora Tokui, Mikoi Sasaki, Izumi Kitta | |
| M A R C H | 4 | Sailor Suit and Machine Gun: Graduation | Kōji Maeda | Kanna Hashimoto, Hiroki Hasegawa, Masanobu Andō, Takurō Ōno | |
| M A R C H | 4 | Doraemon: Nobita and the Birth of Japan 2016 | Shinnosuke Yakuwa | Wasabi Mizuta, Megumi Ohara, Yumi Kakazu, Subaru Kimura, Tomokazu Seki | |
| M A R C H | 11 | PriPara Minna no Akogare Let's Go PriPari | Makoto Moriwaki | Yuri Chinen, Taishi Nakagawa, Nana Komatsu, Erina Mano | |
| M A R C H | 11 | What a Wonderful Family! | Yoji Yamada | Isao Hashizume, Kazuko Yoshiyuki, Masahiko Nishimura, Yui Natsukawa | |
| M A R C H | 11 | Everest: The Summit of the Gods | Hideyuki Hirayama | Junichi Okada, Hiroshi Abe, Machiko Ono, Pierre Taki | |
| M A R C H | 18 | Chihayafuru Part 1 | Norihiro Koizumi | Suzu Hirose, Shuhei Nomura, Mackenyu, Mone Kamishiraishi | |
| M A R C H | 18 | Erased | Yūichirō Hirakawa | Tatsuya Fujiwara, Kasumi Arimura, Rio Suzuki, Tsubasa Nakagawa, Mitsuhiro Oikawa, Tetta Sugimoto, Yuriko Ishida | |
| M A R C H | 18 | Pretty Cure All Stars: Singing with Everyone♪ Miraculous Magic! | Yutaka Tsuchida | Rie Hosaka, Rina Honnizumi, Yui Ogura, Konomi Tada | |
| M A R C H | 25 | Assassination Classroom: Graduation | Eiichirō Hasumi | Sota Fukushi, Yuma Nakayama, Yuki Furukawa, Renn Kiriyama | |

=== April - June ===
| Opening | | Title | Director | Cast | Ref(s) |
|---|---|---|---|---|---|
| A P R I L | 6 | Tamayura ~Sotsugyō Shashin~ Part 4: Ashita | Junichi Sato | Ayana Taketatsu, Kana Asumi, Yuko Gibu, Yuka Iguchi | |
| A P R I L | 8 | Joshikō | Kōki Yamamoto | Minami Minegishi, Riho Takada, Haru Izumi, Erina Nakayama | |
| A P R I L | 15 | Detective Conan: Zero the Enforcer | Kōbun Shizuno | Minami Takayama, Wakana Yamazaki, Rikiya Koyama, Tōru Furuya | |
| A P R I L | 15 | Crayon Shin-chan: Fast Asleep! The Great Assault on Dreamy World! | Wataru Takahashi | Akiko Yajima, Miki Narahashi, Toshiyuki Morikawa, Satomi Kōrogi, Mari Mashiba, Tamao Hayashi | |
| A P R I L | 22 | I've Always Liked You | Tetsuya Yanagisawa | Hiroshi Kamiya, Haruka Tomatsu, Yūki Kaji, Kana Asumi | |
| A P R I L | 22 | Yu-Gi-Oh!: The Dark Side of Dimensions | Satoshi Kuwabara | Shunsuke Kazama, Kenjiro Tsuda, Hiroki Takahashi, Maki Saitō | |
| A P R I L | 22 | I Am a Hero | Shinsuke Sato | Yo Oizumi, Kasumi Arimura, Masami Nagasawa, Hisashi Yoshizawa | |
| A P R I L | 23 | Sound! Euphonium: The Movie – Welcome to the Kitauji High School Concert Band | Tatsuya Ishihara | Tomoyo Kurosawa, Ayaka Asai, Moe Toyota, Chika Anzai | |
| A P R I L | 29 | Terra Formars | Takashi Miike | Hideaki Itō, Emi Takei, Tomohisa Yamashita, Takayuki Yamada | |
| A P R I L | 29 | Chihayafuru Part 2 | Norihiro Koizumi | Suzu Hirose, Shuhei Nomura, Mackenyu, Mone Kamishiraishi | |
| M A Y | 6 | 64: Part I | Takahisa Zeze | Kōichi Satō, Nana Eikura, Gō Ayano, Yui Natsukawa | |
| M A Y | 13 | The Whispering Star | Sion Sono | Megumi Kagurazaka, Kenji Endō, Yūto Ikeda | |
| M A Y | 13 | Hentai Kamen: Abnormal Crisis | Yūichi Fukuda | Ryohei Suzuki, Fumika Shimizu, Yūya Yagira, Tsuyoshi Muro | |
| M A Y | 13 | If Cats Disappeared from the World | Akira Nagai | Takeru Satoh, Aoi Miyazaki, Gaku Hamada, Eita Okuno | |
| M A Y | 20 | After the Storm | Hirokazu Kore-eda | Hiroshi Abe, Kirin Kiki, Yōko Maki, Satomi Kobayashi | |
| M A Y | 21 | Destruction Babies | Tatsuya Mariko | Yūya Yagira, Masaki Suda, Nijiro Murakami, Nana Komatsu, Sosuke Ikematsu, Takumi Kitamura | |
| M A Y | 21 | Garo: Divine Flame | Yuichiro Hayashi | Daisuke Namikawa, Katsuhito Nomura, Romi Park, Kenyu Horiuchi, Miyu Tomita, Arisa Komiya, Masato Hagiwara | |
| M A Y | 27 | Wolf Girl and Black Prince | Ryūichi Hiroki | Fumi Nikaidō, Kento Yamazaki, Mugi Kadowaki, Ryusei Yokohama | |
| M A Y | 27 | Himeanole | Keisuke Yoshida | Gō Morita, Gaku Hamada, Aimi Satsukawa, Tsuyoshi Muro | |
| J U N E | 4 | The Kodais | Masato Hijikata | Haruka Ayase, Takumi Saito, Kiko Mizuhara, Shotaro Mamiya | |
| J U N E | 4 | Evergreen Love | Kōichirō Miki | Takanori Iwata, Mitsuki Takahata, Hana Imai, Joji Abe | |
| J U N E | 10 | 64: Part II | Takahisa Zeze | Kōichi Satō, Nana Eikura, Gō Ayano, Yui Natsukawa | |
| J U N E | 17 | Sadako vs. Kayako | Kōji Shiraishi | Mizuki Yamamoto, Tina Tamashiro, Masahiro Komoto, Masanobu Andō | |
| J U N E | 17 | CREEPY | Kiyoshi Kurosawa | Hidetoshi Nishijima, Yūko Takeuchi, Haruna Kawaguchi, Masahiro Higashide | |
| J U N E | 18 | Mars | Saiji Yakumo | Taisuke Fujigaya, Masataka Kubota, Marie Iitoyo, Hirona Yamazaki | |
| J U N E | 24 | Twisted Justice | Kazuya Shiraishi | Gō Ayano, YOUNG DAIS, Yukio Ueno, Haruna Yabuki | |
| J U N E | 24 | Too Young to Die! | Kankurō Kudō | Tomoya Nagase, Ryunosuke Kamiki, Machiko Ono, Aoi Morikawa | |

=== July - September ===
| Opening | | Title | Director | Cast | Ref(s) |
|---|---|---|---|---|---|
| J U L Y | 1 | Setoutsumi | Tatsushi Ōmori | Sosuke Ikematsu, Masaki Suda, Ayami Nakajo, Takuji Suzuki | |
| J U L Y | 8 | Kingsglaive: Final Fantasy XV | Takeshi Nozue | Gō Ayano, Shiori Kutsuna, Tsutomu Isobe, Shōzō Iizuka | |
| J U L Y | 15 | High & Low: The Movie Series | Shigeaki Kubo | Akira, Sho Aoyagi, Hiroyuki Takaya, Yushin Okami | |
| J U L Y | 15 | Pokémon the Movie: Volcanion and the Mechanical Marvel | Kunihiko Yuyama | Rica Matsumoto, Ikue Ōtani, Megumi Hayashibara, Shinichiro Miki | |
| J U L Y | 22 | Accel World: Infinite Burst | Masakazu Obara | Sachika Misawa, Yūki Kaji, Aki Toyosaki, Shintarō Asanuma | |
| J U L Y | 22 | One Piece Film: Gold | Hiroaki Miyamoto | Mayumi Tanaka, Kazuya Nakai, Akemi Okamura, Kappei Yamaguchi | |
| J U L Y | 29 | Shin Godzilla | Hideaki Anno, Shinji Higuchi | Hiroki Hasegawa, Satomi Ishihara, Yutaka Takenouchi, Kengo Kora | |
| J U L Y | 30 | Corpse Party Book of Shadows | Masafumi Yamada | Rina Ikoma, Ryōsuke Ikeoka, Nozomi Maeda, Ren Ishikawa | |
| A U G U S T | 5 | Rudolf the Black Cat | Kunihiko Yuyama | Ryohei Suzuki, Mao Inoue, Akio Ōtsuka, Arata Furuta | |
| A U G U S T | 13 | Aikatsu!: The Targeted Magical Aikatsu Card and Aikatsu Stars! | Shin'ya Watada, Ryuichi Kimura | Sumire Morohoshi, Azusa Tadokoro, Ayaka Ōhashi, Miyu Tomita | |
| A U G U S T | 19 | Kizumonogatari Part 2: Nekketsu | Akiyuki Shinbo, Tatsuya Oishi | Hiroshi Kamiya, Maaya Sakamoto, Yui Horie, Takahiro Sakurai, Miyu Irino, Masashi Ebara | |
| A U G U S T | 19 | Aozora Yell | Takahiro Miki | Tao Tsuchiya, Ryoma Takeuchi, Shōno Hayama, Arata Horii | |
| A U G U S T | 26 | Your Name | Makoto Shinkai | Ryunosuke Kamiki, Mone Kamishiraishi, Masami Nagasawa, Etsuko Ichihara | |
| S E P T E M B E R | 2 | Planetarian: Storyteller of the Stars | Naokatsu Tsuda | Daisuke Ono, Keiko Suzuki, Tamio Ōki, Sanae Fukui | |
| S E P T E M B E R | 9 | Your Lie in April | Takehiko Shinjō | Kento Yamazaki, Suzu Hirose, Anna Ishii, Taishi Nakagawa | |
| S E P T E M B E R | 16 | A Silent Voice | Naoko Yamada | Miyu Irino, Saori Hayami, Aoi Yūki, Kenshō Ono | |
| S E P T E M B E R | 16 | Rage | Lee Sang-il | Ken Watanabe, Mirai Moriyama, Kenichi Matsuyama, Gō Ayano | |
| S E P T E M B E R | 16 | Over the Fence | Nobuhiro Yamashita | Joe Odagiri, Yū Aoi, Shota Matsuda, Yukiya Kitamura | |
| S E P T E M B E R | 30 | SCOOP! | Hitoshi Ōne | Masaharu Fukuyama, Fumi Nikaidō, Yō Yoshida, Kenichi Takito | |
| S E P T E M B E R | 30 | Cutie Honey: Tears | Asai Takeshi | Mariya Nishiuchi, Takahiro Miura, Nicole Ishida, Sousuke Takaoka | |

=== October - December ===
| Opening | | Title | Director | Cast | Ref(s) |
|---|---|---|---|---|---|
| O C T O B E R | 7 | Night's Tightrope | Yukiko Mishima | Tsubasa Honda, Mizuki Yamamoto, Mackenyu, Ryo Sato | |
| O C T O B E R | 7 | The Good Morning Show! | Ryoichi Kimizuka | Kiichi Nakai, Masami Nagasawa, Mirai Shida, Saburō Tokitō | |
| O C T O B E R | 8 | My Dad and Mr. Ito | Yuki Tanada | Juri Ueno, Tatsuya Fuji, Lily Franky, Tomoharu Hasegawa | |
| O C T O B E R | 14 | The Long Excuse | Miwa Nishikawa | Masahiro Motoki, Eri Fukatsu, Pistol Takehara, Kenshin Fujita | |
| O C T O B E R | 14 | Gantz: O | Keiichi Sato | Daisuke Ono, M.A.O, Tomohiro Kaku, Saori Hayami | |
| O C T O B E R | 14 | Someone | Daisuke Miura | Takeru Satoh, Masaki Suda, Kasumi Arimura, Fumi Nikaidō | |
| O C T O B E R | 15 | Zegapain ADP | Masami Shimoda | Shintarō Asanuma, Kana Hanazawa, Ayako Kawasumi, Romi Park | |
| O C T O B E R | 28 | Her Love Boils Bathwater | Ryōta Nakano | Rie Miyazawa, Hana Sugisaki, Joe Odagiri, Tori Matsuzaka | |
| O C T O B E R | 29 | Death Note: Light Up the New World | Shinsuke Sato | Masahiro Higashide, Sosuke Ikematsu, Masaki Suda, Erika Toda, Rina Kawaei | |
| N O V E M B E R | 4 | Galactic Armored Fleet Majestic Prince: Genetic Awakening | Keitaro Motonaga | Hiroki Aiba, Yōko Hikasa, Yuka Iguchi, Junya Ikeda | |
| N O V E M B E R | 4 | Drowning Love | Yūki Yamato | Nana Komatsu, Masaki Suda, Daiki Shigeoka, Mone Kamishiraishi | |
| N O V E M B E R | 11 | In This Corner of the World | Sunao Katabuchi | Rena Nōnen, Yoshimasa Hosoya, Mayumi Shintani, Shigeru Ushiyama | |
| N O V E M B E R | 11 | Museum | Keishi Ōtomo | Shun Oguri, Satoshi Tsumabuki, Machiko Ono, Shūhei Nomura | |
| N O V E M B E R | 18 | Satoshi: A Move for Tomorrow | Yoshitaka Mori | Kenichi Matsuyama, Masahiro Higashide, Lily Franky, Keiko Takeshita | |
| N O V E M B E R | 25 | KanColle: The Movie | Keizō Kusakawa | Sumire Uesaka, Rina Hidaka, Yumi Tanibe, Saki Fujita | |
| N O V E M B E R | 25 | Itazura na Kiss the Movie ~High School-Hen~ | Minoru Mizoguchi | Kanta Satō, Reina Bisa, Nonoka Yamaguchi, Simon Ohkura | |
| N O V E M B E R | 26 | Shippu Rondo | Teruyuki Yoshida | Hiroshi Abe, Tadayoshi Okura, Yuko Oshima, Tsuyoshi Muro | |
| D E C E M B E R | 9 | Monster Strike The Movie | Shinpei Ezaki | Maaya Sakamoto, Tomo Muranaka, Yūsuke Kobayashi, Lynn | |
| D E C E M B E R | 9 | Fueled: The Man They Called Pirate | Takashi Yamazaki | Junichi Okada, Hidetaka Yoshioka, Shōta Sometani, Tōru Nomaguchi | |
| D E C E M B E R | 14 | The Moment You Fall in Love | Tetsuya Yanagisawa | Momo Asakura, Natsuki Hanae, Tsubasa Yonaga, Yoshimasa Hosoya | |
| D E C E M B E R | 14 | My Tomorrow, Your Yesterday | Takahiro Miki | Sota Fukushi, Nana Komatsu, Masahiro Higashide, Yuki Yamada | |
| D E C E M B E R | 14 | Yo-kai Watch: Soratobu Kujira to Double no Sekai no Daibōken da Nyan! | Shigeharu Takahashi, Shinji Ushiro | Ryōka Minamide, Haruka Tomatsu, Tomokazu Seki, Etsuko Kozakura | |
| D E C E M B E R | 23 | Pop in Q | Naoki Miyahara | Asami Seto, Shiori Izawa, Tomoyo Kurosawa, Atsumi Tanezaki | |
| D E C E M B E R | 23 | The Mole Song: Hong Kong Capriccio | Takashi Miike | Toma Ikuta, Eita, Tsubasa Honda, Shinichi Tsutsumi | |
| D E C E M B E R | 31 | Kabaneri of the Iron Fortress Pt.1 | Nobuhiro Yamashita, Tetsurō Araki | Tasuku Hatanaka, Sayaka Senbongi, Maaya Uchida, Toshiki Masuda | |

== See also ==
- 2016 in Japan
- 2016 in Japanese television
- List of 2016 box office number-one films in Japan
