= Rie Mimura =

Japanese actress (born 1984)

- 美村 里江
- Born: 15 June 1984 (age 42); Fukaya, Saitama, Japan
- Occupation: Actress
- Years active: 2003–present

Rie Mimura (美村 里江, Mimura Rie; born 15 June 1984 in Fukaya, Saitama, Japan) is a Japanese actress. Her former stage name was Mimula. She is best known for her performance as Kyoko Okudera in One Missed Call 2.

== Filmography ==
=== Television ===
- Gō (2011), Hosokawa Gracia
- Doctor Ume (2012)
- Segodon (2018), Ōkubo Masu
- The Great White Tower (2019), Kimiko Kameyama
- Reach Beyond the Blue Sky (2021), Tokushin-in
- The Grand Family (2021), Ichiko Mima
- Takasugi-san's Obento (2024), Miya Takasugi
- The Great Passage (2024), Kaguya Majime
- Kamen Rider Zeztz (2025–2026), The Lady

=== Films ===
- One Missed Call 2 (2005)
- Living in the Sky (2020)
- Taste and Tears (2025), Minami Kazama
- Frontline: Yokohama Bay (2025), Sakura Kawamura
- Sham (2025), Shoko Hakozaki
- Never Guilty (2026), Mina Hayashi
