= The Untold Tale of the Three Kingdoms =

- Poster
- 新解釈・三國志
- Directed by: Yuichi Fukuda
- Written by: Yuichi Fukuda
- Based on: Records of the Three Kingdoms
- Produced by: Naoaki Kitajima; Shinzo Matsuhashi
- Starring: Yo Oizumi
- Narrated by: Toshiyuki Nishida
- Cinematography: Tetsuya Kudo; Yasuyuki Suzuki
- Edited by: Eri Usuki
- Music by: Eishi Segawa
- Production company: CREDEUS Inc.
- Distributed by: Toho
- Release date: December 11, 2020
- Running time: 113 minutes
- Country: Japan
- Language: Japanese
- Box office: ¥4.01 billion

The Untold Tale of the Three Kingdoms (Japanese: 新解釈・三國志, Hepburn: Shinkaishaku Sangokushi) is a 2020 Japanese comedy film directed by Yuichi Fukuda from his own script. Starring Yo Oizumi as Liu Bei with an ensemble cast portraying other people of the three kingdoms, it is an adaptation of Records of the Three Kingdoms with a new comedic interpretation by Fukuda himself.

Before the release of the film on in Japan, it was set to be released in South Korea, Hong Kong and Taiwan. It premiered in Taipei on December 10, 2020, and an online event was held to celebrate its premiere as the cast could not travel to Taiwan due to the COVID-19 pandemic. On December 11, 2020, the film was released in Japan, South Korea, and Taiwan.

It grossed 4.01 billion yen in Japan.

== Plot ==
Eighteen hundred years ago, the three kingdoms of Wei, Shu, and Wu were rivalling each other for the unification of China. In such a world, Liu Bei, a warlord who wishes for peace for his people, stands up. Liu Bei and other warlords from various countries run through the turbulent times, and eventually the Battle of Red Cliffs occurs where the overwhelming difference in military strength between the Wei army of 800,000 and the combined forces of Shu and Wu of 30,000 clashes.

== Cast ==
- Yo Oizumi as Liu Bei.He founds the kingdom of Shu and became its first emperor. Concerned about the stormy state of the world, he starts a volunteer army with Guan Yu and Zhang Fei, with whom he shared a brotherly relationship. He is known for his compassion and popularity, but in this film, he is portrayed as a petulant man who hates to fight, complaining and whining when he opens his mouth. However, when he gets drunk, he becomes overzealous and says things in a brash manner, and many people fall in love with him because of this high aspirations.
- Tsuyoshi Muro as Kong Ming. He is a genius military strategist who pledges his loyalty to Liu Bei, to whom he owes "the courtesy of the three visits". He is a charismatic figure who uses his clear judgment and foresight to toy with the enemy and create divine calculations on the battlefield. However, in the film, he is conspicuously shallow in his thinking, accepting Zhou Yu's unreasonable requests even though he doesn't have a chance to win. His words are often light-hearted and off-the-cuff, but he is also a man of exceptional luck.
- Satoshi Hashimoto as Guan Yu. Wielding his huge Green Dragon Crescent Blade sword with ease, Guan Yu's trademark is his magnificent beard, which has earned him the nickname "Lord of the Beautiful Beard.
- Tsutomu Takahashi as Zhang Fei. He is exceptionally brave, short-tempered and dynamic. Like his brother-liked fellow Guan Yu, he loves Liu Bei's personality and adore him as their "big brother". They have a hard time motivating Liu Bei, who is troublesome and tries to run away whenever there is a chance, to do the thing he should do as their king and general.
- Kanna Hashimoto as Lady Zhuge. She is a clever woman who supports her husband with her wit. Though she appears as a devil-may-care wife who abuses her useless husband, Zhuge Liang owns her his success.
- Takanori Iwata as Zhao Yun. A loyal general who serves Liu Bei. He has many episodes of bravery and courage, such as carrying Liu Zen, Liu Bei's son who was still a baby, through the enemy lines single-handedly. He is the "most handsome man in the Three Kingdoms" by his own admission, and Liu Bei and his friends are bewildered by the narcissistic atmosphere.
- Naomi Watanabe as Diaochan.A beautiful woman who was sent to turn Dong Zhuo and Lü Bu against each other by inciting jealousy between them. She excels at singing and dancing, and bewitches the two with her bewitching charm. She is a woman with a strong will and determination, but in fact, she has a surprising secret.
- Yu Shirota as Lü Bu, a powerful general who serves Dong Zhuo. He rides a famous horse, The Red Hare, which is said to run a thousand miles a day, and is as strong as a demon god. However, there are rumors that he is not very smart.
- Jiro Sato as Dong Zhuo, a warlord who becomes the de facto ruler of China in a boy-emperor's name. He is feared as the greatest and fiercest general in the world. He is also very fond of beautiful woman.
- Kento Kaku as Zhou Yu, the supreme commander of the country of "Wu". He is a military commander with superior intelligence and wisdom who has led many battles to victory and is a devoted supporter of his master, Sun Quan. However, he is also emotional, quick to anger, and narrow-minded.
- Mizuki Yamamoto as Xiao Qiao, Zhou Yu's wife and a famous beauty. She is pure and knows nothing about the cruelty of war.
- Kenshi Okada as Sun Quan, the ruler of Wu, following in the footsteps of his father, Sun Jian, and his brother, Sun Saku. He is as a straightforward and serious king, and he accepts whatever his vassals say and changes his opinion frequently. He immediately trusts Kong Ming when he proposes an alliance, which irritates Zhou Yu.
- Yuma Yamoto as Huang Gai, a veteran general of the country of "Wu", who uses his wisdom and his experience of life to guide the youngs.
- Kazuaki Hankai as Lu Su, a military general and politician of the country of "Wu", who serves as Zhou Yu's assistant.
- Shun Oguri as Cao Cao, the penultimate grand chancellor of the Eastern Han dynasty. He aid the foundations for what was to become the state of Cao Wei and ultimately the Jin dynasty, with his intelligence, political power, and amazing leadership skills that showed no mercy to those who opposed him. He is seen as Liu Bei's greatest nemesis. Meanwhile, he is completely bored with his daily life of warfare and has a large number of maids at his beck and call. He is often scolded by his cousin and aide, Xiahou Dun, for such behavior.
- Hayato Isomura as Xun Yu, the main advisor to Cao Cao.
- Shinnosuke Abe as Xiahou Dun, a military general serving under the warlord Cao Cao. He is brave and powerful as a one-eyed warrior.
- Takayuki Yamada as Yellow Turban, with yellow turban on his head, he and his fellows rebels the control of the Han dynasty and add to the chaos of the Turbulent world.
- Toshiyuki Nishida (narrator) as Soga Munemitsu, a historian who challenges the Records of the Three Kingdoms with a "new interpretation".

Suzu Hirose also appears in the film as Diaochan.

== Release ==
The film had its premiere at Lux Cinema in Taipei on December 10, 2020, and opened in Japan, South Korea, and Taiwan on the next day. Its Hong Kong release date was postponed from December 11, 2020, to March 4, 2021, due to the COVID-19 pandemic.

=== Marketing ===
The film was announced on June 5, 2019, as Yuichi Fukuda's first film starring Yo Oizumi. It was revealed that it would be a film about the three kingdoms, and Yo Oizumi would portray Liu Bei. Then from June to September, six short making-ofs was released on the third day of each month with the announcement of new cast. On October 3, it was also announced that Toshiyuki Nishida has also joined the film as narrator. Masaharu Fukuyama was announced to be the man who sang the theme song of the film on October 8, and a trailer with the song as its soundtrack was released on the same day. On December 10, Yo Oizumi, Tsuyoshi Muro, Takanori Iwata, Kento Kaku, Shun Oguri and director Yuichi Fukuda attended an online event on the eve of the release of the film. The event was livestreamed in Tokyo, South Korea and Hong Kong, where the film would be distributed, and Taiwan, where the film would premiere after the event.

== Reception ==
=== Box office ===
The Untold Tale of the Three Kingdoms was second placed at the Japanese box office on its opening, grossing ¥770 million with 550,000 audiences. The film grossed 4.01 billion yen in total while under the influence of restrictions on the operation of cinema because of COVID-19 pandemic.

=== Critical response ===
Film critic Onodera Kei criticized the film for its expression of "comedy" being making fun of people's characteristics, such as their appearance and personality, but he also pointed out that the "new interpretation" of the story focused on the existence of Lady Huang, Zhuge Liang's wife, writing "The film boldly proposes that it was a single woman who had influenced the course of events" and described it the only part that is interesting and diverse of the film.
