= Nobunaga Concerto (film) =

- Poster
- Japanese: 信長協奏曲
- Directed by: Hiroaki Matsuyama
- Written by: Masafumi Nishida; Michitaka Okada; Keisuke Uyama
- Screenplay by: Masafumi Nishida (manga)
- Story by: Ayumi Ishii
- Based on: Nobunaga Concerto by Ayumi Ishii
- Produced by: Naoto Inaba; Ken Murase; Shinya Furugori
- Starring: Shun Oguri
- Edited by: Shoji Ehara
- Music by: ☆Taku Takahashi
- Production companies: Fuji TV; Akita Television; Ehime Broadcasting
- Distributed by: Toho
- Release date: 23 January 2016
- Running time: 126 minutes
- Country: Japan
- Language: Japanese
- Box office: $42.6 million

Nobunaga Concerto (信長協奏曲) is a 2016 Japanese jidaigeki adventure film directed by Hiroaki Matsuyama, starring Shun Oguri and based on the manga series of the same name by Ayumi Ishii. It was released in Japan by Toho on 23 January 2016.

== Plot ==
Saburo (Shun Oguri) is a high school student good in sports, but not very good with his studies. One day, Saburo travels back in time and arrives in the Sengoku period of 1549. There, Saburo meets Nobunaga Oda who looks and sounds just like Saburo. Nobunaga Oda is the son of a warlord and magistrate of the lower Owari Province. Nobunaga Oda though is physically weak and he asks Saburo to take his place. Then, Saburo as Nobunaga Oda attempts to unify the country of Japan.

== Cast ==
- Shun Oguri as Saburō/Oda Nobunaga/Akechi Mitsuhide
- Kō Shibasaki as Kichō
- Osamu Mukai as Ikeda Tsuneoki
- Takayuki Yamada as Hashiba Hideyoshi
- Gaku Hamada as Tokugawa Ieyasu
- Arata Furuta as Matsunaga Hisahide
- Taisuke Fujigaya as Maeda Toshiie
- Kiko Mizuhara as Oichi
- Masahiro Takashima as Shibata Katsuie
- Denden
- Katsuya as Hachisuka Koroku
- Masanobu Sakata
- Shinnosuke Abe
- Takumi Kitamura

== Reception ==
The film was number-one on its opening weekend in Japan, with 465,956 admissions and ¥616 million (US$5.2 million) in gross. It was the 9th highest-grossing film in Japan in 2016 and also the 6th highest-grossing Japanese film of the year in the country, with ¥4.6 billion (US$39.11 million).
