= List of 2016 box office number-one films in Japan =

The following is a list of 2016 box office number-one films in Japan. When the number-one film in gross is not the same as the number-one film in admissions, both are listed.

== Number-one films ==
| † | This implies the highest-grossing movie of the year. |

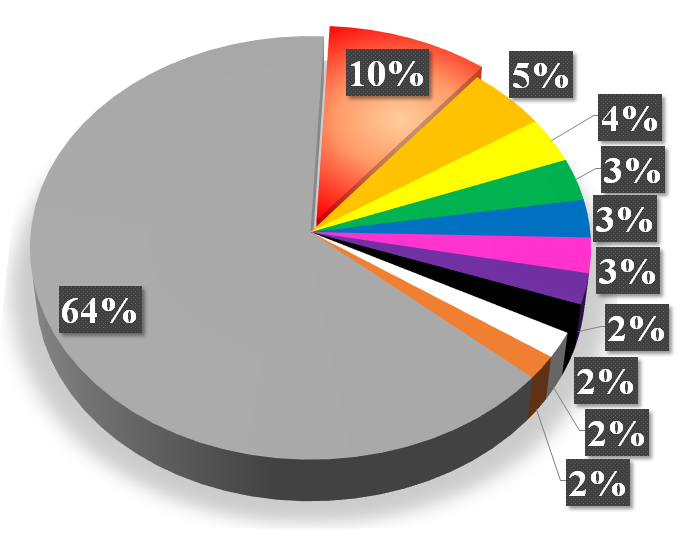
Your Name: 23.56 billion yen Star Wars: The Force Awakens: 11.63 billion yen Shin Godzilla: 8.25 billion yen Zootopia: 7.63 billion yen Finding Dory: 6.83 billion yen Detective Conan: The Darkest Nightmare: 6.33 billion yen Yo-kai Watch: Soratobu Kujira to Double no Sekai no Daibōken da Nyan!: 5.53 billion yen One Piece Film Gold: 5.18 billion yen Nobunaga Concerto: 4.61 billion yen The Secret Life of Pets: 4.24 billion yen Others: 151.79 billion yen Total: 235.58 billion yen

| # | Date | Film | Gross | Notes |
|---|---|---|---|---|
| 1 | January 3, 2016 | Star Wars: The Force Awakens | US$6.9 million | |
| 2 | January 10, 2016 | Star Wars: The Force Awakens | US$5.3 million | |
| 3 | January 17, 2016 | Star Wars: The Force Awakens | US$3.3 million | |
| 4 | January 24, 2016 | Nobunaga Concerto: The Movie | US$5.2 million | |
| 5 | January 31, 2016 | Nobunaga Concerto: The Movie | US$5.1 million | |
| 6 | February 7, 2016 | The Martian | US$4.2 million | |
| 7 | February 14, 2016 | The Martian | US$3.6 million | |
| 8 | February 21, 2016 | The Martian | US$2.5 million | |
| 9 | February 28, 2016 | The Martian | US$1.9 million | In gross |
| 9 | February 28, 2016 | Kurosaki-kun no Iinari ni Nante Naranai | US$1.7 million | In attendance |
| 10 | March 6, 2016 | Doraemon: Nobita and the Birth of Japan 2016 | US$8.6 million | |
| 11 | March 13, 2016 | Doraemon: Nobita and the Birth of Japan 2016 | US$7.84 million | |
| 12 | March 20, 2016 | Doraemon: Nobita and the Birth of Japan 2016 | US$6.41 million | |
| 13 | March 27, 2016 | Assassination Classroom: Graduation | US$5.64 million | |
| 14 | April 3, 2016 | Assassination Classroom: Graduation | US$3.5 million | |
| 15 | April 10, 2016 | Assassination Classroom: Graduation | US$1.8 million | |
| 16 | April 17, 2016 | Detective Conan: The Darkest Nightmare | US$11.0 million | |
| 17 | April 24, 2016 | Detective Conan: The Darkest Nightmare | US$6.1 million | |
| 18 | May 1, 2016 | Detective Conan: The Darkest Nightmare | US$5.3 million | |
| 19 | May 8, 2016 | Zootopia | US$3.6 million | |
| 20 | May 15, 2016 | Zootopia | US$4.2 million | |
| 21 | May 22, 2016 | Zootopia | US$4.6 million | |
| 22 | May 29, 2016 | Zootopia | US$3.10 million | |
| 23 | June 5, 2016 | Deadpool | US$6.5 million | In gross |
| 23 | June 5, 2016 | Evergreen Love | US$3.2 million | In attendance |
| 24 | June 12, 2016 | 64: Part II | US$3.3 million | |
| 25 | June 19, 2016 | Sadako vs. Kayako | US$1.10 million | |
| 26 | June 26, 2016 | Too Young To Die! | US$2.5 million | |
| 27 | July 3, 2016 | Alice Through the Looking Glass | US$4.1 million | |
| 28 | July 10, 2016 | Independence Day: Resurgence | US$6.06 million | |
| 29 | July 17, 2016 | Finding Dory | US$7.07 million | |
| 30 | July 24, 2016 | One Piece Film: Gold | US$10.89 million | |
| 31 | July 31, 2016 | Shin Godzilla | US$6.12 million | |
| 32 | August 7, 2016 | Shin Godzilla | US$5.30 million | |
| 33 | August 14, 2016 | The Secret Life of Pets | US$9.63 million | |
| 34 | August 21, 2016 | Shin Godzilla | US$3.79 million | |
| 35 | August 28, 2016 | Your Name † | US$9.1 million | |
| 36 | September 4, 2016 | Your Name † | US$11.36 million | |
| 37 | September 11, 2016 | Your Name † | US$11.09 million | |
| 38 | September 18, 2016 | Your Name † | US$10.7 million | |
| 39 | September 25, 2016 | Your Name † | US$8.6 million | |
| 40 | October 2, 2016 | Your Name † | US$7.8 million | |
| 41 | October 9, 2016 | Your Name † | US$6.8 million | |
| 42 | October 16, 2016 | Your Name † | US$4.5 million | |
| 43 | October 23, 2016 | Your Name † | US$4.56 million | |
| 44 | October 30, 2016 | Death Note: Light Up the New World | US$4.38 million | |
| 45 | November 6, 2016 | Your Name † | US$2.8 million | |
| 46 | November 13, 2016 | Your Name † | US$2.4 million | |
| 47 | November 20, 2016 | Your Name † | US$2.32 million | |
| 48 | November 27, 2016 | Fantastic Beasts and Where to Find Them | US$7.3 million | |
| 49 | December 4, 2016 | Fantastic Beasts and Where to Find Them | US$5.9 million | |
| 50 | December 11, 2016 | Fantastic Beasts and Where to Find Them | US$4.9 million | In gross |
| 50 | December 11, 2016 | Monster Strike The Movie | US$3.8 million | In attendance |
| 51 | December 18, 2016 | Rogue One: A Star Wars Story | US$5.6 million | In gross |
| 51 | December 18, 2016 | Yo-kai Watch: Soratobu Kujira to Double no Sekai no Daibōken da Nyan! | US$5.2 million | In attendance |
| 52 | December 25, 2016 | Resident Evil: The Final Chapter | US$5.27 million | |

== See also ==
- List of Japanese films of 2016
