= Yūichi Satō =

Japanese film director

- Born: August 18, 1962 (age 63); Tokyo, Japan
- Occupation: Film director

Yūichi Satō (佐藤祐市, Satō Yūichi; born August 18, 1962 in Tokyo) is a Japanese film director.

== Filmography ==
- Pray (2005)
- Simsons (ja) (2006)
- Kisaragi (2007)
- Guardian Angel (ja) (2009)
- A Man on the Verge at a Black Company (ja) (2009)
- Strawberry Night (2013)
- Poison Berry in My Brain (2015)
- Kasane: Beauty and Fate (2018)
- You, I Love (2018)
- The Master Plan (2021)
- City Hunter (2024)
- 6 Lying University Students (2024)
