= Hearts and Flowers for Tora-san =

- Theatrical release poster
- Directed by: Yoji Yamada
- Written by: Yoji Yamada; Yoshitaka Asama
- Starring: Kiyoshi Atsumi; Ayumi Ishida
- Cinematography: Tetsuo Takaba
- Edited by: Iwao Ishii
- Music by: Naozumi Yamamoto
- Distributed by: Shochiku
- Release date: August 7, 1982
- Running time: 110 minutes
- Country: Japan
- Language: Japanese

Hearts and Flowers for Tora-san (男はつらいよ 寅次郎あじさいの恋, Otoko wa Tsurai yo: Torajirō Ajisai no Koi) is a 1982 Japanese comedy film directed by Yōji Yamada. It stars Kiyoshi Atsumi as Torajirō Kuruma (Tora-san), and Ayumi Ishida as his love interest or "Madonna". Hearts and Flowers for Tora-san is the twenty-ninth entry in the popular, long-running Otoko wa Tsurai yo series.

== Synopsis ==
During his travels, Tora-san gets drunk with an old man in Kyoto. Though Tora-san never fully comprehends his importance, the old man is a Living National Treasure ceramist. At his home, Tora-san makes a good impression on the old man's maid, who apparently falls in love with Tora-san.

== Cast ==
- Kiyoshi Atsumi as Torajirō
- Chieko Baisho as Sakura
- Ayumi Ishida as Kagari
- Nizaemon Kataoka as Kanō
- Shimojo Masami as Kuruma Tatsuzō
- Chieko Misaki as Tsune Kuruma (Torajiro's aunt)
- Gin Maeda as Hiroshi Suwa
- Hidetaka Yoshioka as Mitsuo Suwa
- Hisao Dazai as Boss (Umetarō Katsura)
- Gajirō Satō as Genkō
- Chishū Ryū as Gozen-sama
- Akira Emoto as Kondō

== Critical appraisal ==
Ayumi Ishida was nominated for Best Actress, and Akira Emoto for Best Supporting Actor at the Japan Academy Prize for their roles in Hearts and Flowers for Tora-san. Long-time composer for the series, Naozumi Yamamoto, was nominated for Best Music Score. Enomoto won the award for Best Supporting Actor at the Blue Ribbon Awards.

Stuart Galbraith IV writes that the film "is no better than average for this series, but then again this series' average is awfully high." He notes that this is the first episode in the series in which Tora-san's nephew Mitsuo plays a significant role in the plot. The German-language site molodezhnaja gives Hearts and Flowers for Tora-san three and a half out of five stars.

== Availability ==
Hearts and Flowers for Tora-san was released theatrically on August 7, 1982. In Japan, the film was released on videotape in 1986 and 1996, and in DVD format in 2002 and 2008.
