= Akira Emoto =

Japanese actor (born 1948)

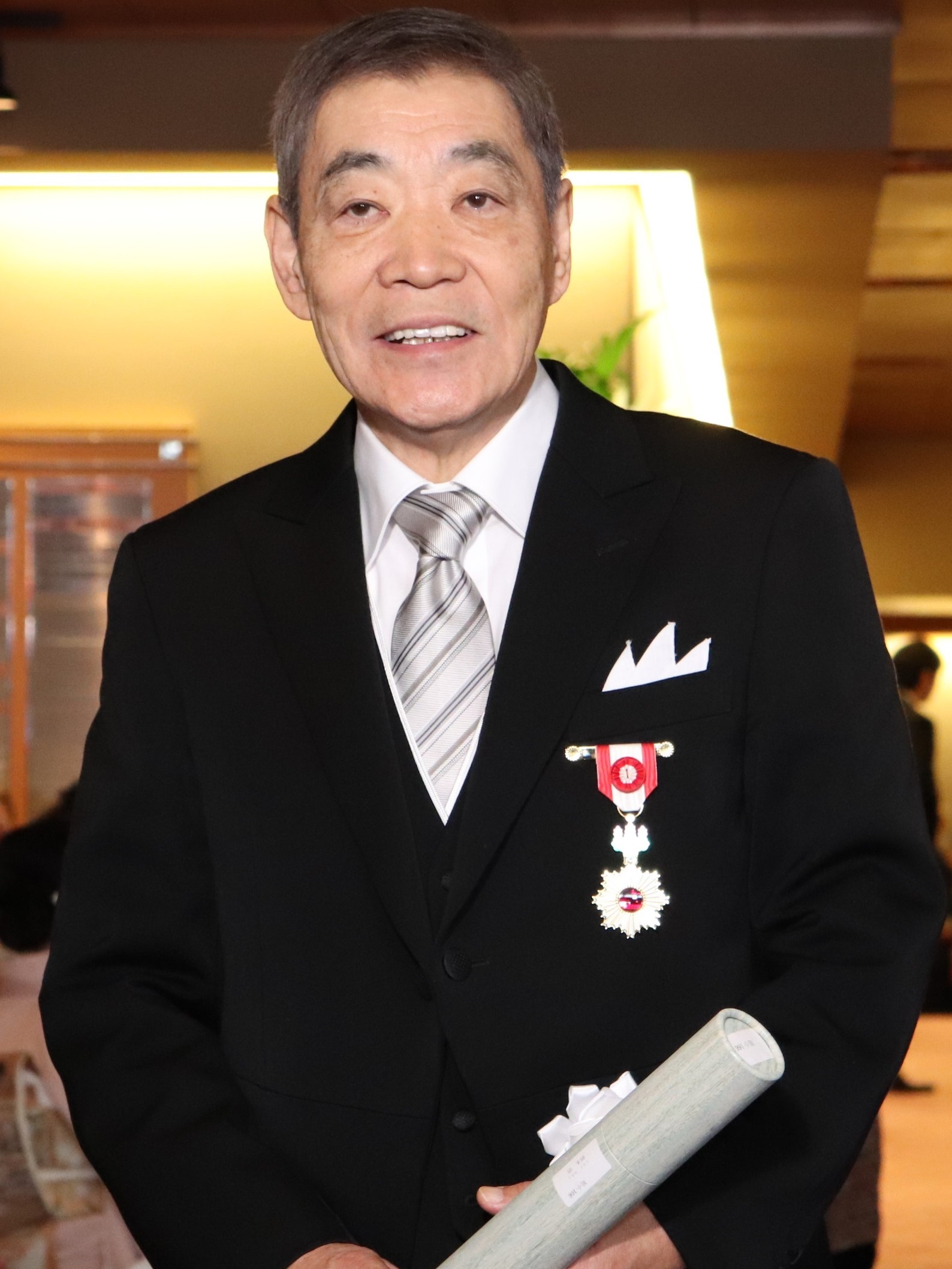
- Emoto in 2019
- Born: 3 November 1948 (age 78); Chūō, Tokyo, Japan
- Occupation: Actor
- Years active: 1974–present
- Spouse: Kazue Tsunogae (m. 1981; died 2018)
- Children: Tasuku Emoto; Tokio Emoto
- Relatives: Sakura Ando (daughter-in-law); Honami Sato (daughter-in-law)

Akira Emoto (柄本 明, Emoto Akira; born November 3, 1948) is a Japanese actor.

== Career ==
In 1999, he won the Japanese Academy Award for Best Actor for his performance in the title role in Dr. Akagi. He also won the award for best supporting actor at the 7th Hochi Film Award for Dotonbori River and Hearts and Flowers for Tora-san.

== Personal life ==
His wife was the actress Kazue who died in 2018. Together they have two sons, actors Tasuku and Tokio. Emoto has two grandchildren from each of his two sons.

== Selected filmography ==
=== Film ===
Year	Title	Role	Notes	Ref.
1980	Disciples of Hippocrates	Katō		
1981	Sailor Suit and Machine Gun	Kuroki		
1982	Dotonbori River	Ishizuka		
1982	Hearts and Flowers for Tora-san	Kondō		
1982	Suspicion	Shigekazu Akitani		
1983	Amagi Goe			
1984	Kesho	Kikuo Tsutano		
1984	Location	Konno		
1985	Capone Cries a Lot	Ushiemon		
1985	Ikite mitai mō ichido: Shinjuku Basu Hōka Jiken	Hirofumi Maruyama		
1985	Nidaime wa Christian	Detective Kumashiro		
1986	Final Take	Director Saeki		
1987	Bedtime Eyes	Ooguro		
1987	The Heartbreak Yakuza	Shoji Kato		
1988	Angel Guts: Red Vertigo	Yakuza		
1988	Kimurake no Hitobito	Shinichi Amemiya		
1988	The Silk Road			
1989	Tora-San Goes to Vienna	Heiba Sakaguchi		
1990	Uchū no hōsoku	Nagayama		
1991	Bakumatsu Junjoden	Katsura Kogorō		
1992	Sumo Do, Sumo Don't	Professor Tokichi Anayama		
1993	Ahiru no Uta ga Kikoete kuru yo	Ryosuke Kaji		
1994	Natsu no niwa	Nagatomo		
1994	Godzilla vs. SpaceGodzilla	Major Akira Yuki		
1995	Maborosi	Yoshihiro		
1996	Shall We Dance?	Toru Miwa		
1996	Tsuribaka Nisshi 8	Yukawa		
1997	The Eel	Tamotsu Takasaki		
1998	Dr. Akagi	Dr. Fuu Akagi	Lead role	
1999	Kaizokuban Bootleg Film	Tatsuo		
2000	Another Heaven			
2000	The City of Lost Souls	Kuwata		
2001	Turn	Matsubara		
2001	Waterboys	Mama-san		
2001	Onmyoji	Fujiwara no Motokata		
2002	KT	Hiroshi Uchiyama		
2002	11'09"01 September 11		segment "Japan"	
2003	Owl			
2003	Samurai Resurrection			
2003	Zatōichi	Tavern Owner Pops		
2003	Drugstore Girl	Nabeshima		
2004	Zebraman	Kani-Otoko		
2004	Lakeside Murder Case	Tomoharu Fujima		
2005	Tetsujin 28: The Movie			
2005	The Great Yokai War	Screaming Farmer		
2005	Scrap Heaven	Detective Yabuta		
2006	Japan Sinks	Prof. Fukuhara		
2006	Memories of Matsuko	Kozo Kawajiri		
2006	The Go Master	Kensaku Segoe	Chinese film	
2007	Tokyo Tower: Mom and Me, and Sometimes Dad	Doctor		
2007	Mōryō no Hako	Koshiro Mimasaka		
2008	All Around Us			
2008	Tsukiji Uogashi Sandaime	Shojiro Sanada		
2008	Ishiuchi Jinjo Koto Shogakko: Hana wa chiredomo	Yoshio Ichikawa		
2008	Ikigami	Counselor		
2008	Asahiyama Zoo Story: Penguins in the Sky	Itsuro Usui		
2008	Ichi	Takeshi Hyoue		
2008	Happy Flight	Etsuko's father		
2008	The Chasing World	Doctor		
2009	Rain Fall	Tatsu Ishikura		
2009	John Rabe	General Iwane Matsui	German-Chinese-French film	
2009	April Bride	Teishi Nagashima		
2010	Villain			
2010	Raiou	Kakunoshi Enokido		
2010	Postcard	Ykichi Morikawa		
2010	Haru's Journey			
2010	The Lone Scalpel			
2011	Antoki no Inochi			
2011	Isoroku	Mitsumasa Yonai		
2011	Karate-Robo Zaborgar	Dr. Akunomiya		
2011	In His Chart			
2012	Gyakuten Saiban	The Judge		
2012	A Sower of Seeds			
2013	Unforgiven	Kingo Baba		
2014	0.5 mm			
2015	The Big Bee			
2015	Journey to the Shore			
2016	Shippu Rondo			
2016	Shin Godzilla	The Chief Cabinet Secretary		
2016	Black Widow Business			
2017	Survival Family	Shigeomi Sasaki		
2017	Nariyuki na Tamashii			
2017	Mukoku	Seppō Mitsumura		
2017	Lu Over the Wall	Kai's grandfather (voice)		
2018	Evil and the Mask	Detective Aida		
2018	Recall	Nomura		
2018	Color Me True	Tadashi Honda		
2018	Shoplifters			
2018	Oz Land	Miyagawa		
2019	The Promised Land	Gorō Fujiki		
2019	Iwane: Sword of Serenity			
2019	Show Me the Way to the Station			
2019	They Say Nothing Stays the Same		Lead role	
2020	Nōten Paradise			
2020	Family Bond			
2020	Stardust Over the Town			
2020	I Never Shot Anyone			
2020	The Legacy of Dr. Death: Black File			
2020	Nosari: Impermanent Eternity			
2020	Living in the Sky			
2020	Independence of Japan	Jōji Matsumoto		
2020	Underdog			
2021	The Master Plan			
2021	Baragaki: Unbroken Samurai	Marujū Tenshu		
2021	Utsusemi no Mori			
2021	The Great Yokai War: Guardians	Old man		
2021	Inori			
2022	A Man	Norio Omiura		
2022	Noise	Shōkichi Yokota		
2022	Wandering			
2022	No Place to Go	Homeless		
2022	The Setting Sun	Dr. Miyake		
2023	Yudo: The Way of the Bath	Hermit		
2023	Umami	The Salaryman	Japanese-French film	
2023	Shylock's Children	Hajime Sawazaki		
2023	Egoist	Yoshio Saito		
2023	Do Unto Others			
2023	September 1923			
2023	Ripples	Tarō Kadokura		
2023	Hard Days			
2023	Ai no Komuragaeri	Hiroshi Saionji		
2023	The Innocent Game	Nagura		
2024	Don't Lose Your Head!	Yanagisawa Yoshiyasu		
2024	Samurai Detective Onihei: Blood for Blood			
2024	Maru			
2024	Curling Dream			
2025	Muromachi Outsiders	Master Karasaki		
2025	The Boy and the Dog	Yaichi Katano		
2025	Rental Family	Kikuo Hasegawa	American film	
2025	One Last Throw	Kozo Kawato		
2025	The Final Piece	Motoji Kanesaki		
2026	Kyoto Hippocrates			
2026	The Imaginary Dog and the Lying Cat			
2026	The Hikikomori Extraction			
2026	The Sound of You			
2027	Hara o Kukutte			

=== Television ===
Year	Title	Role	Notes	Ref.
1991	Taiheiki	Kō no Moronao	Taiga drama	
1995	Hachidai Shōgun Yoshimune	Tokugawa Munenao	Taiga drama	
1999	Genroku Ryōran	Shindō Genshirō	Taiga drama	
2006	Kōmyō ga Tsuji	Toyotomi Hideyoshi	Taiga drama	
2009–11	Clouds Over the Hill	Nogi Maresuke		
2012	Man of Destiny	Masayoshi Kodaira		
2012–17	Folktales from Japan	Narrator		
2013	The Partner	Ōkuma Shigenobu	TV movie	
2017	A Life	Toranosuke Danjō		
2017	Frankenstein's Love	Toshifumi Tsurumaru		
2017	Silver and Gold	Hitoshi Kuramae		
2018	Segodon	Ryu Samin	Taiga drama	
2018	Good Doctor	Akira Shiga		
2019	Castle of Sand	Chiyokichi	TV movie	
2020	Hanzawa Naoki	Keiji Minobe	Season 2	
2021	Bullets, Bones and Blocked Noses	Chōsuke	Miniseries	
2022	Teen Regime	Prime Minister Tsuguaki Washida	Miniseries	
2022	Lost Man Found	Himself		
2025	Scandal Eve	Shigeru Kodama		
2026	Song of the Samurai	Nagakura Shinpachi (old)		
2026	Rosanjin's Stove	Shigeru Yoshida	Miniseries	
2027	The Shogunate Rebel	Tokugawa Nariaki	Taiga drama	

=== Japanese dub ===
Year	Title	Role	Notes	Ref.
2024	Blind Willow, Sleeping Woman	The owner		
2025	Zootopia 2	Jesús	Animated film	

== Honours ==
- Medal with Purple Ribbon (2011)
- Order of the Rising Sun, 4th Class, Gold Rays with Rosette (2019)
