= Vision (2018 film) =

2018 film by Naomi Kawase

- Film poster
- Directed by: Naomi Kawase
- Written by: Naomi Kawase
- Produced by: Satoshi Miyazaki; Marianne Slot; Kumie
- Starring: Juliette Binoche; Masatoshi Nagase; Takanori Iwata; Minami; Mirai Moriyama
- Cinematography: Arata Dodo
- Edited by: Francois Gedigier, Yoichi Shibuya
- Music by: Makoto Ozone
- Production companies: LDH Japan; Slot Machine; Naomi Kawase
- Release date: 8 June 2018
- Running time: 109 minutes
- Countries: Japan; France
- Languages: English; Japanese; French

Vision is a 2018 drama film directed by Naomi Kawase from her own script. It stars Juliette Binoche and Masatoshi Nagase, with Takanori Iwata, Minami, Mirai Moriyama in supporting roles.The film tells the story of a French woman who goes to look for vision, the plant she hears legends about, in an ancient forest of Japan. There she meets Tomo, and starts a story with him that crosses cultures and languages.

After a Japanese release on June 8, 2018, Vision made its North American debut at the 2018 Toronto International Film Festival and its European debut at the 66th San Sebastián International Film Festival.

== Plot ==
Jeanne is a French essayist who writes travelogues while traveling around the world. She visits Yoshino, Nara Prefecture, with her assistant Hana to do some research for her essay. Jeanne is determined to find a mythical herb known as "vision", as she has heard the legend that it can alleviate human pain when it scatters its spores every 997 years. She meets Tomo, a mountain guardian who lives in a mountainous area covered in cedar trees, as she arrives at the ancient forest, and the two gradually transcend cultural barriers and develop a rapport during the search for the herb. She also gets to know Rin, a mountain guardian like Tomo, Aki, the older, blind forest denizen, Gaku, a hunter, and Gen; they all live in the mountains, and the mountain protect them. Their fates intersect in unexpected ways.

== Cast ==
- Juliette Binoche - Jeanne
- Masatoshi Nagase - Tomo
- Takanori Iwata - Rin
- Mari Natsuki - Aki
- Minami - Hana
- Mirai Moriyama - Gaku
- Min Tanaka - Minamoto

== Production ==
The film started shooting in September 2017 and was shot for two and a half weeks in September before it resumed shooting in November. The film was tailored to suit Binoche's schedule. When it transpired that she would be available during September and November, Kawase opted to write a story that was split into two halves. The feature is set in Kawase's native Nara Prefecture as many of her films are, with the local Yoshino Mountains and forests figuring prominently in the film. The film's location, deep in the mountains of the director's native Nara, was chosen partly to satisfy the actress's eagerness to see rural Japan.

Kawase and Binoche first met at an official dinner at the Cannes Film Festival in 2017, and Kawase recalled that "the moment I met her, I knew I wanted to work with her." The project of the two working together was accelerated by Paris-based production company founder Marianne Slot, who was seated next to Kawase at a dinner at 2017's Cannes Festival, and their discussion led to a decision in June for Slot Machine and Kawase's production house Kumie Inc. to collaborate on a film, with Slot bringing in Binoche to star. Wild Bunch handled international sales and Haut et Court pre-bought French rights.

== Release ==
The film opened in Japan on June 8, 2018, and then made its North American debut at the 2018 Toronto International Film Festival and its European debut at the 66th San Sebastián International Film Festival. It was released on November 28 in France, 2018, on December 28, 2018 in Spain, and on February 14, 2019 in Germany.

=== Marketing ===
Vision was announced on September 7, 2017, revealing that Juliette Binoche would co-star with Masatoshi Nagase in this new project of Naomi Kawase. On January 18, 2018, it was announced that Takanori Iwata, Mari Natsuki, Minami, Mirai Moriyama, and Min Tanaka would appear in the film and that the film had finished shooting in early December. On April 26, a special press conference was held in Hotel Gajoen Tokyo, with director Naomi Kawase and Masatoshi Nagase, Takanori Iwata, Mari Natsuki, Minami attending. The poster and the first trailer of the film were released on the same day, while it was also announced that the film would be released on June 8. The second trailer was released on May 17. On May 25, it was announced that Juliette Binoche would come to Japan for the release of the film. On June 9, Juliette Binoche, Masatoshi Nagase, Takanori Iwata, Mari Natsuki, Minami, and director Naomi Kawase attended a special greeting event at Shinjuku Piccadilly Cinema in Tokyo.

A preview screening was held at Cinémathèque française in Paris on July 18, 2018, with Naomi Kawase, Juliette Binoche, and Taro Kono, the Japanese Minister for Foreign Affairs at the time, attending. It was the first screening of the film outside of Japan.

== Reception ==
Vision has an approval rating of 42% on review aggregator website Rotten Tomatoes, based on 12 reviews, and an average rating of 5.9/10.

Variety Critic Guy Lodge described the film as "a mixed hessian bag of Kawase's best and worst creative impulses", and stated that "still buoyed by Binoche's ever-disarming presence, it should be her most widely distributed work to date." Meanwhile, Cinema Scope critic Michael Sicinski was disappointed with the film, writing that "despite the presence of an international superstar (Juliette Binoche) for the first time in Naomi Kawase's filmography, Vision will not convert anyone to the Kawase cause." Hollywood Reporter critic Leslie Felperin gave also wrote that the film did not work for her, and called the film "the soporific pace and twee quasi-environmentalist, semi-mystical guff about life cycles and dreams foretold will annoy some viewers."
