= Last Winter, We Parted =

- Film poster

Japanese name
- Kanji: 去年の冬、きみと別れ
Transcriptions
- Revised Hepburn: Kyonen no fuyu Kimi to wakare
- Directed by: Tomoyuki Takimoto
- Written by: Tetsuya Oishi
- Based on: Last Winter, We Parted by Fuminori Nakamura
- Produced by: Osamu Kubota
- Starring: Takanori Iwata; Mizuki Yamamoto; Takumi Saitoh
- Cinematography: Taro Kawazu
- Edited by: Nobuyuki Takahashi
- Music by: Kōji Ueno
- Production companies: C&I entertainment
- Distributed by: Warner Bros. Pictures
- Release date: 10 March 2018 (Japan)
- Running time: 118 minutes
- Country: Japan
- Language: Japanese

Last Winter, We Parted (Japanese: 去年の冬、きみと別れ, Hepburn: Kyonen no fuyu Kimi to wakare) is a 2018 Japanese crime film directed by Tomoyuki Takimoto, based on the 2013 novel of the same name by Fuminori Nakamura. The film stars Takanori Iwata, Mizuki Yamamoto and Takumi Saitoh.

The film was distributed by Warner Bros. Pictures Japan. It was released in Japan on March 10, 2018, and was released in Hong Kong on June 28 of the same year.

== Plot ==
Kyosuke Yakumo, a young reporter looking for a scoop, is preparing to marry his beloved Yuriko while continuing his chase to talented photographer Yudai Kiharazaka. Kiharazaka is the prime suspect of a still riddle-laden incident involving the death of a beautiful blind woman in a fire, and Yakumo manages to interview him so that he can writes a book about the case. The closer Yakumo gets to the truth, the deeper he plunges into Kiharazaka's devilry. Meanwhile, his fiancée Yuriko is falling slowly into a trap.

== Cast ==
- Takanori Iwata as Kyosuke Yakumo, an ambitious reporter who is about to get married. But as he becomes obsessed with investigating the case of a blind girl who was burned to death, his life and that of his fiancée Yuriko change drastically.
- Mizuki Yamamoto as Yuriko Matsuda, Yakumo's fiancée, who is beautiful and happy. But in the course of Yakumo's investigation into the case, their relationship gradually develops a rift. At this point, she meets Yudai Kiharazaka and agrees to be his photo model, stepping into a dangerous situation.
- Takumi Saitoh as Yudai Kiharazaka, a talented photographer and the prime suspect of the blind-woman-burnt-to-death case. He has an unusual obsession with butterflies and Ryūnosuke Akutagawa's novel "Hell Screen". He waits for an opportunity to approach Yuriko and lures her into agreeing to be his model with flowery words.
- Reina Asami as Akari Kiharazaka, Yudai's older sister who has an extremely wild personality. Although she has a successful career, she has a dark past that is not well known. She was abused by her father as a child and had an ambiguous relationship with her brother.
- Kazuki Kitamura as Yoshiki Kobayashi, the editor of a weekly magazine that Yakumo works for. Though he seems to be objective and impartial about Yakumo's investigation into the death of the blind woman, he seems to be hiding something. As Yakumo's investigation progresses, he begins to suspect Yakumo's true motives for pursuing the case.
- Kaho Tsuchimura as Akiko Yoshioka, the blind woman who was burnt to death.

== Release ==
Last Winter, We Parted had its Japanese premiere on February 21, 2021, at Tokyo Dome City Hall, and was released in Japan on March 10. It was released in Hong Kong on June 28 of the same year, and was shown on Shanghai International Film Festival.

=== Marketing ===
The film was announced on August 1, 2017, as the film adaption of the award-winning novel of the same title, with Takanori Iwata leading and Mizuki Yamamoto, Takumi Saitoh joining the cast. A teaser was released on October 2, 2017, and the poster of the film was released on October 24. On December 15, it was announced that m-flo would provide the theme song for the film, and a trailer using that song as background music was released on January 22, 2018. The main cast of the film including Takanori Iwata, Mizuki Yamamoto and Takumi Saitoh attended a series of special greeting events before and after the release of the film in cinemas of Tokyo to promote it.
