= Living in the Sky =

2020 Japanese romance film

- Poster
- 空に住む (Sora ni sumu)
- Directed by: Shinji Aoyama
- Written by: Masato Odake
- Screenplay by: Shinji Aoyama; Chihiro Ikeda
- Based on: Living in the Sky by Masato Odake
- Produced by: Tetsuhiro Inoue; Hiroaki Saito
- Starring: Mikako Tabe
- Cinematography: Mio Nakajima
- Edited by: Genta Tamaki
- Music by: Hiroyuki Nagashima
- Production companies: KAZUMO; HIGH BROW CINEMA
- Distributed by: Asmik Ace
- Release date: October 23, 2020
- Running time: 118 minutes
- Country: Japan
- Language: Japanese

Living in the Sky is a 2020 romance film directed by Shinji Aoyama (which was his final film before his death in 2022) from a screenplay written by himself and Chihiro Ikeda, based on lyricist Masato Odake's novel of the same title. It stars Mikako Tabe, with Yukino Kishii, Rie Mimura, Takanori Iwata in supporting roles. The film tells the story of a young lady moving to a high-rise apartment owned by her uncle and his wife to recover from the loss of her parents, where she meets actor Tokito Morinori, and her life begins to change as she struggles to figure the road she should choose. The theme song of the film is Sandaime J Soul Brothers' "Sora ni Sumu～Living in your sky～".

The project was announced on August 24, 2020, as Shinji Aoyama's first feature film after a seven-year lapse. Released by Asmik Ace, the film had its premiere on October 4, 2020, in Tokyo, and was released on October 23, 2020. It was screened at Busan International Film Festival on October 25, and at Taipei Golden Horse Film Festival on November 14,16 and 18.

Living in the Sky received critical acclaim, and was listed in Kinema Junpo 2020's list of the top 10 Japanese films of the year.

== Plot ==
Naomi, who works at a small publishing house in the suburbs, is unable to accept the sudden death of her parents, so she starts living at a high-rise apartment owned by her uncle and his wife, who kindly allow her to stay there on her own. She lives with her long-time partner, Haru, a black cat, and is surrounded by like-minded colleagues, including a junior colleague who is pregnant. After a dream-like encounter in an elevator, her neighbor, actor Tokito Morinori, starts to pursue Naomi, which makes her flutter. The sight outside the window of the high-rise building that cuts through the clouds seems to reflect her dazed present and confusing future. Floating between her workplace, love, and life goals, Naomi is still searching and finding her true self.

== Cast ==
- Mikako Tabe as Naomi Kobayakawa, editor of a small publishing house. Her parents are both dead, and with the help of her uncle Masahiro, she lives in an apartment in a tower with her beloved cat Haru. Even though she did not shed any tears about the death of her parents, she always feels a bit lonely and empty. One day, she meets Morinori Tokido, a star actor who lives in the same apartment.
- Yukino Kishii as Aiko Kinoshita, Naomi's junior colleague and also an editor. She is hiding a big secret that although she is close to marriage and childbirth, the child in her belly is not the child of her fiance. Although she hides the secret by showing a cheerful face to everyone around her, the time to give birth is finally approaching.
- Mimula as Asuko Kobayakawa, Masahiro's wife and Naomi's aunt. She lives in a high-class apartment in a harmonious relationship with her husband and has been taking care of Naomi since she moves to the same apartment. She seems to be living a free life, but she has a sense of loss that only she can understand.
- Takanori Iwata as Tokito Morinori, a star actor who is getting a lot of attention. One day, he meets Naomi by chance in the elevator of his apartment and started to have a relationship with her from then on. Although the relationship starts by chance, it went through a special development afterward.
- Shingo Tsurumi as Masahiro Kobayakawa，Naomi's uncle and Asuko's husband. He is gentle to his wife, and he cares for Naomi, but he doesn't notice the troubles Asuko is facing.
- Hisafumi Iwashita as the owner of the publishing house where Naomi and Aiko works. His publishing house was converted from an old private house, and he has the belief that he would only publish books that he is proud of. Although he is a bit puffed up with pride, he has gained deep trust from his staff.
- Yô Takahashi as Kashiwagi, the editor-in-chief of the publishing house where Naomi works. He negotiated repeatedly about whether to publish the new work of novelist Yoshida directly or to serialise it. He has a good grasp of Naomi's weaknesses.
- Nao Ōmori as Osamu Yoshida, novelist. After winning a literary award and being highly anticipated, he hopes to release his new work at the publishing house where Naomi works and begins to negotiate. He and Aiko have a big secret between them that no one knows.
- Akira Emoto as Kondō, the concierge of the tower apartment where Naomi lives.
- Masatoshi Nagase as a funeral director for pets.

== Release ==
The film had its premiere at Marunouchi Piccadilly in Tokyo on October 4, 2020, and opened in Japan on October 23 of the same year.

It was also screened at Busan International Film Festival on October 25, 2020 and at Taipei Golden Horse Film Festival on November 14,16 and 18.

=== Marketing ===
On August 24, 2020, the film adaptation of the novel of the same title written by lyricist Masato Odake was announced, and the cast of the film was revealed. On September 3, a poster and trailer for the film were released, and the theme song of the film was revealed to be Sandaime J Soul Brothers' "Sora ni Sumu～Living in your sky～", which was released in 2017 with lyrics written by Masato Odake. Some stills from the film were released on September 8, and on September 14, a full-length trailer for the film with the lyrics of the theme song was released. On October 4, the premiere for the film was held in Tokyo, with cast members Mikako Tabe, Yukino Kishii, Rie Mimura, Takanori Iwata, and director Shinji Aoyama attending. More stills from the film were released on October 6, and on October 10, stills and a video clip of the black cat, the only living being who understands the heroine in the film, were released.

== Reception ==
Kentaro Muramatsu described the film as "an incredible film", writing "Director Shinji Aoyama's style of work is mostly sharp and experimental, but he is someone who can be both intense and yet make warm, smooth work. And Living in the Sky is exactly along these lines. The film has neither big events nor extremely emotional parts, not to mention the story of the protagonist who is completely free of violent atmosphere. The film penetrates into the human heart in addition to memories. While director Aoyama aims to tell the stories of women living in modern society, the film Living in the Sky is a work that contains universal things that have nothing to do with whether they are female or male. It is not that there is anything special or that is particularly conspicuous, but somehow it leaves a deep impression."
