= Hope: Kitai Zero no Shinnyu Shain =

Japanese television series

- Genre: Drama
- Written by: Yuichi Tokunaga
- Directed by: Keita Kono; Hidenori Joho
- Starring: Yuto Nakajima; Kenichi Endō; Kōji Seto; Mizuki Yamamoto; Akito Kiriyama; Takaya Yamauchi; Mayumi Asaka; Morio Kazama
- Country of origin: Japan
- Original language: Japanese

Production
- Producer: Masataka Takamaru
- Running time: 54 minutes

Original release
- Network: Fuji Television
- Release: July 17, 2016 – present

Hope: Kitai Zero no Shinnyu Shain (HOPE〜期待ゼロの新入社員〜) is a Japanese television drama series based on the South Korean webtoon Misaeng and TV series Misaeng.

The drama premiered on Fuji Television on July 17, 2016.
