= High&Low: The Story of S.W.O.R.D. =

2015 Japanese action television series

- Season 1 Poster
- Genre: Action
- Written by: Team HI-AX; Keisuke Makino(seasons 2); Takako Murayama(seasons 2)
- Directed by: Shigeaki Kubo; Toshimitsu Chimura(seasons 1); Hiroki Kubota(seasons 1); Yūdai Yamaguchi; Tsuyoshi Nakakuki(seasons 2); Takanori Tsujimoto(seasons 2)
- Composers: Yuta Nakano; Agung Gede
- Country of origin: Japan
- Original language: Japanese
- No. of seasons: 2
- No. of episodes: 20

Production
- Executive producers: Chiaki Furuno; Hirotaka Mori
- Cinematography: Yasutaka Nagano; Junichi Kato
- Editor: Makoto Suzuki
- Production companies: LDH; Nippon TV

Original release
- Network: Nippon TV
- Release: October 22, 2015 – June 26, 2016

High&Low:The Story of S.W.O.R.D. is a Japanese Action television series produced by LDH and NTV. As the first media production of the High&Low franchise, it began the franchise and introduced the basic background of the world of High&Low, serving as a prelude for the High&Low films released in 2016 and later.

The story is set in a town where five gangs of young people, Sannoh Rengokai (Hoodlum Squad), White Rascals, Oya Koukou (Oya High School), Rude Boys, and Daruma Ikka, took control of the town on their separate territory. Based on the initials of the five gangs that lead each territory, the town began to be known as the SWORD area. However, the yakuza organization Kuryu Group tried to take control of it, and it got help from newcomer groups like Mighty Warriors, who also have their own angles. The show introduced all the groups in the SWORD area and the conflict between the SWORD gangs and Kuryu Group.

The main director of High＆Low:The Story of S.W.O.R.D. is Shigeaki Kubo, while Toshimitsu Chimura, Hiroki Kubota, Yūdai Yamaguchi, Tsuyoshi Nakakuki and Takanori Tsujimoto also serve as directors for different episodes. The series's ensemble cast includes not only a large number of members of the Exile Tribe, Takanori Iwata, Akira, Sho Aoyagi, Takahiro and Hiroomi Tosaka for instances, but also actors like Kento Hayashi, Masataka Kubota, and Yuki Yamada. Season 1 began to be aired on NTV on October 22, 2015, and season 2 began to be aired on April 17, 2016. Shortly after the broadcast of its last episode, the first High&Low film, High&Low The Movie, was released.

== Synopsis ==
After the sudden disbanding of the legendary group Mugen, who used to control the town, 5 new groups appeared. Sannoh Rengokai (Hoodlum Squad), White Rascals, Oya Koukou (Oya High School), Rude Boys, and Daruma Ikka, took control of the town on their separate territory, and the town began to be known as the SWORD area. When they tried to protect their town from the yakuza organization Kuryu Group, their epic stories began.

== Cast and characters ==
See High&Low The Movie#Cast, as cast and characters in High＆Low:The Story of S.W.O.R.D. are the same with the movie version.

- Takanori Iwata as Cobra, leader of Sannoh Rengokai (Hoodlum Squad), and a member of the former legendary gang Mugen.
- Nobuyuki Suzuki as Yamato, a childhood friend of Cobra and Noboru and Sannoh Rengokai (Hoodlum Squad) 's a second man.
- Keita Machida as Noboru, a childhood friend of Cobra and Yamato.
- Kenjiro Yamashita as Dan, a member of Sannoh Rengokai (Hoodlum Squad) and the "D" of the small sub-unit DTC.
- Kanta Sato as Tettsu, a member of Sannoh Rengokai (Hoodlum Squad) and the "T" of the small sub-unit DTC.
- Taiki Sato as Chiharu, a member of Sannoh Rengokai (Hoodlum Squad) and the "C" of the small sub-unit DTC.
- Akira as Kohaku, leader of the former legendary gang Mugen.
- Sho Aoyagi as Tsukumo, Kohaku's right arm man and the vice-leader of the former Mugen.
- Arata Iura as Tatsuya, one of Kohaku's best friends since childhood.
- Shuuka Fujii as Naomi, Tatsuya's sister and the owner of the diner "Itokan".
- Takahiro as Masaki Amamiya.
- Hiroomi Tosaka as Hiroto Amamiya.
- Keiji Kuroki as Rocky, leader of White Rascals.
- Yuya Endo as Koo, a White Rascals member.
- Shuntarō Yanagi as Kaito, a member of White Rascals.
- Yu Inaba as Kizzy, a member of White Rascals.
- Yuki Yamada as Yoshiki Murayama, leader of Oya Koukou (Oya High School).
- Gōki Maeda as Yosuke Todoroki, leader of Oya Koukou (Oya High School)'s full-time school.
- Masataka Kubota as Smoky, leader of Rude Boys.
- Reo Sano as Takeshi, a member of Rude Boys.
- Tasuku Nagase as Shion, a member of Rude Boys.
- Karen Fujii as Lala, sister of Smoky.
- Kento Hayashi as Norihisa Hyuga, leader of Daruma Ikka.
- Kenchi Tachibana as Nikaido, an executive of Iemurakai of Kuryu Group.
- Tatsuya Nakamura as Tatsumi Iemura, leader of Iemurakai of Kuryu Group, and one of Kuryu Group's nine dragons.
- V.I as Lee, son of Chanson's boss Chang.
- Elly as ICE, leader of Mighty Warriors.
- Alan Shirahama as Bernie, a member of Mighty Warriors and a hacker.
- Kana Oya as Sarah, the only female member of Mighty Warriors.
- Shintaro Akiyama as Takano, a member of Doubt.
- Fujiko Kojima as Junko, leader of female gang Ichigo Milk.
- Kyōko Koizumi as Odake, who has a bar on Sannoh shopping street.
- You as Hisako Asahina, Yamato's mother.
- Kōsuke Toyohara as Saigo, the cop who is in charge of the SWORD area.

== Episodes ==
=== Season 1 (2015) ===
No.	Title	Directed by	Written by	Original release date
1	"Sannoh Rengokai (Hoodlum Squad)"	Shigeaki Kubo	Team HI-AX	October 22, 2015
The legend begins in a town. Once, a legendary gang called Mugen ruled this area. With their overwhelming power, they were able to control the area. However, there was a pair of brothers who refused to bow to Mugen's reign, and they can even equal Mugen in fights. The two are known as the Amamiya brothers. However, Mugen suddenly disbanded after an incident, and the Amamiya brothers disappeared. Then, five new gangs emerge in the town, and the town begins to be known as the SWORD area, with S.W.O.R.D. stands for the initials of the five gangs. These five gangs, Sannoh Rengokai (Hoodlum Squad)'s second generational fighters, White Rascals, the tempting white demons, Oya Koukou (Oya High School), the ruthless dark high school, Rude Boys, the ghosts of the merciless street, Daruma Ikka, a family of revenging demolishers, are called G-SWORD.A battle for pride is about to begin between these five gangs. The story begins with Sannoh Rengokai (Hoodlum Squad). Cobra, Yamato, Dan, and Tettsu, the members of Sannoh Rengokai (Hoodlum Squad) only have one thing in their mind: to protect their hometown. They avoid any kind of conflict that would disrupt the peace of the town, but things take a turn for the worse when a man shows up. The balance of SWORD is shifting...
2	"Oya Koukou (Oya High School)"	Shigeaki Kubo	Team HI-AX	October 29, 2015
For some reason, Chiharu has become the target of attack by all students of Oya Koukou (Oya High School). Yamato, who happened to be present at the scene of the lynching, though worried about causing conflicts with Oya Koukou (Oya High School), saves Chiharu with his natural sense of justice. After that, Chiharu begs Yamato for a chance to join the Sannoh Rengokai (Hoodlum Squad). Yamato agrees, but he is rebuffed by the other members of the gang. Meanwhile, Oya Koukou (Oya High School) discovers that Chiharu is being sheltered by Sannoh Rengokai (Hoodlum Squad). They rush to diner ITOKAN, where the members of Sannoh Rengokai (Hoodlum Squad) loves to hangout. In Cobra's absence, Yamato adamantly refuses to hand over Chiharu, and therefore Murayama, the leader of Oya Koukou (Oya High School) declares wars to Sannoh Rengokai (Hoodlum Squad).
3	"Sannoh Rengokai (Hoodlum Squad) vs Oya Koukou (Oya High School)"	Shigeaki Kubo	Team HI-AX	November 5, 2015
In the midst of a volatile situation with Oya Koukou (Oya High School), Yamato is facing fierce opposition from his fellow members Sannoh Rengokai (Hoodlum Squad). He is struggling to find a way to somehow save Chiharu, who has nowhere to go. Yamato thinks of his former comrade, Noboru, and Chiharu in the same light. Even now, he is still unable to escape the guilt he feels for not being able to save Noboru. In order to make up for the damage and conflicts he has caused, Chiharu goes to Oya Koukou (Oya High School) by himself. The students of Oya Koukou (Oya High School) are merciless in their attempts to hurt Chiharu, while Yamato, followed by Cobra and other members of Sannoh Rengokai (Hoodlum Squad), rushes to the scene to save Chiharu. In fact, Cobra feels responsible for not being able to save Noboru as well. And finally, Sannoh Rengokai (Hoodlum Squad) and Oya Koukou (Oya High School) clash...
4	"White Rascals"	Toshimitsu Chimura	Team HI-AX	November 12, 2015
The members of Sannoh Rengokai (Hoodlum Squad) are enjoying their peaceful life for a while after the battle with Oya Koukou (Oya High School), and Dan and Tettsu are so bored that they want to find themselves some girls. Dan is fascinated by a beautiful woman, Lala, who happened to call out to him, and she takes him into "Heaven", a club that is run by the man who is in charge of the White Rascals. When Dan tries to leave early for fear of collision, Lala asks him to do something for her. Induced by Lala's beauty, Dan tries to do it as Lala has requested, but...
5	"Noboru"	Toshimitsu Chimura	Team HI-AX	November 19, 2015
When Sannoh Rengokai (Hoodlum Squad) is about to have a fight with White Rascals, Noboru, Cobra and Yamato's friend from the past, suddenly appears. In contrary to Cobra and Yamato's wishes, Noboru announced that he has become a member of Iemurakai of Kuryu Group, and he presses Cobra to come under the umbrella of his organization. As Cobra has refused his request, Noboru leaves with a wry smile, leaving Cobra and Yamato in shock. What happened to these three childhood friends who were once the best of friends?
6	"Rude Boys"	Toshimitsu Chimura, Hiroki Kubota	Team HI-AX	November 26, 2015
The SD card Dan received from Lala, which triggered the clash between Sannoh Rengokai (Hoodlum Squad) and White Rascals, has got into Chiharu's possession for some reason, though it should have been taken by someone in club Heaven. Yamato tries to question him, but Chiharu escapes and disappears. Yamato returns the SD card to ROCKY and explains to him that Sannoh Rengokai (Hoodlum Squad) has nothing to do with everything around the SD card, they are just some outsiders who have been caught up into the whole thing by accident. However, ROCKY refuses his explanation, and the rift between the two gangs deepens for the worse. Meanwhile, Dan follows Lala when he happens to see her in town. And he finds out that...
7	"Chiharu"	Hiroki Kubota	Team HI-AX	December 3, 2015
Dan, who followed Lala to the Nameless Street, the territory of Rude Boys and they enter a crowded building, where they see a kind of new drug, Red Rum, being manufactured. What's more, Chiharu, who had disappeared, is there as well. Dan's shocking testimony on his return to Sannoh Rengokai (Hoodlum Squad) is enough to change the thoughts of the members of Sannoh Rengokai (Hoodlum Squad), but Yamato is determined to find out the truth. He rides into the Nameless Street alone. Smoky, the leader of the RUDE BOYS, does not welcome the sudden visit and is stubborn about admitting the fact that he is not a drug manufacturer. With the help of Dan and Tettsu, who have rushed to the scene, Yamato avoids a collision with Rude Boys. However, Yamato is still not satisfied and decides to go to the Red Rum manufacturing plant...
8	"Iemurakai of Kuryu Group"	Hiroki Kubota	Team HI-AX	December 10, 2015
Members of Sannoh Rengokai (Hoodlum Squad), White Rascals, and Rude Boys are now standing in the Red Rum manufacturing plant, facing one another. When a volatile situation is about to break out, they realize that Iemurakai of Kuryu Group has been causing a series of disturbances to stimulate clash between the SWORD gangs. They avoid collisions at the last minute, and as a result, Noboru is blamed by his superior for his failure. Cobra ponders if he could manage to save Noboru, but he can't come up with any solution at all. Meanwhile, Hyuga, the leader of Daruma Ikka, is finally released from prison. As Hyuga has ordered, Daruma Ikka starts a "Hunt of SWORD".
9	"Daruma Ikka"	Yūdai Yamaguchi	Team HI-AX	December 24, 2015
As Hyuga has ordered, Daruma Ikka attacks Sannoh Rengokai (Hoodlum Squad), White Rascals, Oya Koukou (Oya High School)， and Rude Boys. Daruma Ikka is formed around Hyuga, whose family's organization, Hyuga Ikka used to follow Kuryu Group, but were crushed by Mugen. Therefore, Daruma Ikka is full of members with the same grudge against Mugen, but they could not revenge as Mugen has suddenly disbanded, and now they use their rage to attack the other SWORD gangs fiercely. On the other hand, Cobra and Yamato find out that the only way to save Noboru is to disband Sannoh Rengokai (Hoodlum Squad), and they don't know what to do. While they are unable to reach a conclusion, they receive news that Sannoh Rengokai (Hoodlum Squad) is under attack by Daruma Ikka.
10	"Iemurakai of Kuryu Group"	Yūdai Yamaguchi	Team HI-AX	December 24, 2015
The deadly fight between Cobra and Hyuga is about to end, but as Daruma doesn't fall, Hyuga is still relentlessly challenging the Cobra. With neither team able to pull back, Noboru appears. He is cut off from the path of retreat, and his gun is clutched in his hand. Though held at gunpoint, Yamato and Cobra still desire to save their friend Noboru. What would be the decision of Noboru?

=== Season 2 (2016) ===
No.	Title	Directed by	Written by	Original release date
1	TBA	Shigeaki Kubo	Keisuke Makino, Takako Murayama/Team HI-AX	April 17, 2016
The story goes back to the past. Kohaku and Tatsuya, two best friends since childhood, were both motorcycle enthusiasts. They founded "Mugen" together, hoping that their happy time together will last forever. Ohta, Konishi, Tsukumo, and Tatsuya's younger friend Cobra, and Yamato joined the gang, making the total number of members seven. It was a happy time for them. Meanwhile, Tatsuya announces that he wants to open a Western-style restaurant, a dream he has had since he was a child, and declares that he wants to leave Mugen. All of Mugen's member started working together to open the diner "ITTOKAN", but Kohaku's feelings were mixed. ... In the present, a raid on the nefarious Scout gang "Doubt" begins in the coastal regions. When carrying out the raid, the newcomer gang Mighty Warriors happens to rescue a stranger who was kidnapped by Doubt. Her name is Sarah. The story begins to unfold...
2	TBA	Tsuyoshi Nakakuki, Yūdai Yamaguchi	Keisuke Makino, Takako Murayama/Team HI-AX	April 24, 2016
Mighty Warriors is found when a bunch of people gathered with a dream of building their own utopia. At first, Sarah has doubts about their belief of music and fashion being able to save people, but after ICE tells her their miserable pass, she understands them and joins the gang. In the past, Iemurakai of Kuryu Group is finally making its move. Cobra is attacked by Kuryu Group's faction, the Hyugakai, and Tatsuya stops them from making a mess. Mugen's members, including Kohaku, become adamant about retaliation. As a result, Six Mugen members have a fight with the Hyugakai, who outnumbers them and is using weapons in a despicable manner, with their bare hands.
3	TBA	Tsuyoshi Nakakuki, Yūdai Yamaguchi	Keisuke Makino, Takako Murayama/Team HI-AX	May 8, 2016
After the fight with Hyugakai, Mugen becomes well-known for its strength. The little gang started by Kohaku and Tatsuya suddenly grows to be a giant. However, Ohta and Konishi leave the gang for their dream, and Kohaku couldn't accept the fact that his old friends are leaving one by one. He forgets the feeling when he found Mugen with his friend Tatsuya and begins to lead the gang as its leader, leaving Tsukumo, Cobra, and Yamato in complex feelings. Meanwhile, Mugen has a conflict with the Amamiya Brothers, and finally, they decide to get into a fight.
4	TBA	Takanori Tsujimoto	Keisuke Makino, Takako Murayama/Team HI-AX	May 15, 2016
When Mugen was still a small group of friends with Kohaku, Tatsuya, Ohta, and Konishi as its only members, they met Tsukumo. Tsukumo, who has lived in solitude, have no idea about friends, turned on Mugen. In order to end their fight, Kohaku and Tsukumo had a bet with their beloved motorcycle. On an uninhabited pier, the one-on-one race began. What would be the outcome of the race, and how did Tsukumo become Mugen's companion? The past begins to be unraveled.
5	TBA	Tsuyoshi Nakakuki	Keisuke Makino, Takako Murayama/Team HI-AX	May 22, 2016
The tragedy that befell Noboru is superimposed on Tatsuya, and he died in front of his friend Kohaku. Since then, a strong belief of never letting any friend die has grown inside Cobra. After Novor's arrest, a negative chain of events piled up to follow. The father of Miho, Noboru's girlfriend, is heavily in debt, and Miho has to work at Doubt's club to pay off the debt. Meanwhile, Miho learns that Noboru has an accident. Miho rushes to the hospital, worried about Noboru, but a group of dummies blocks her way. Just then, a mysterious pair of men appear and save Miho from Doubt. Who are these two men? In the present time, Mighty Warriors and Iemurakai of Kuryu Group begin to cause disturbing events in the SWORD area...
6	TBA	Tsuyoshi Nakakuki	Keisuke Makino, Takako Murayama/Team HI-AX	May 29, 2016
Kaito and Kizzy were members of Doubt, and were the most violent members even in this gang of people who kidnapped women for members. But now, they comes to follow Rocky, and they found White Rascals to protect woman, which is the principle of Rocky. In the present, Meanwhile, Noboru's condition takes a sudden turn for the worse... and members of Sannoh Rengokai (Hoodlum Squad) rush to the hospital. What will happen to Noboru ...
7	TBA	Takanori Tsujimoto	Keisuke Makino, Takako Murayama/Team HI-AX	June 5, 2016
Todoroki transfers to Oya Koukou (Oya High School) with the ambition to become the strongest man there, and now he is fighting for the position of the leader of Oya Koukou (Oya High School) with his bare fist. Meanwhile, Murayama is not himself. He used to think that it would mean something for him to become the leader of Oya Koukou (Oya High School), but after the fierce battle with Cobra, he almost loses sight of his goal. Todoroki, who has beaten the leader of The Full-time School in the blink of an eye, sends a letter to a duel to Murayama, the guardian of Oya Koukou (Oya High School). A fierce battle between the new students and the gang leader is about to begin...
8	TBA	Takanori Tsujimoto	Keisuke Makino, Takako Murayama/Team HI-AX	June 12, 2016
Believing that becoming the leader of Oya Koukou (Oya High School) would bring him fame and glory, and therefore he uses despicable means to beat the student of The Part-time School and provokes Murayama to fight. On the other hand, Murayama finds Todoroki similar to his former self, and when he is asking himself repeatedly the question of who he is, he faces the fight. The Part-time School vs. The Full-time School battle finally begins. With their friends on their sides, they engage in heated one-on-one combat. It's a back and forth battle that can hardly end. Meanwhile, Iemurakai of Kuryu Group finally began to make a concerted effort to control the SWROD area.
9	TBA	Tsuyoshi Nakakuki	Keisuke Makino, Takako Murayama/Team HI-AX	June 19, 2016
Visiting the tomb of Tatsuya, Kohaku tells him that Tsukumo has waken from his coma. Tatsuya also comes to the tomb, and he makes up his mind there that he will follow Kohaku no matter what happens. Meanwhile, people living at the Nameless Street continues to harvest those underground minerals that provide their livelihood. Iemurakai of Kuryu Group, who knows the existence of the minerals, bring a proposal of attacking the SWORD area to a man.
10	TBA	Tsuyoshi Nakakuki	Keisuke Makino, Takako Murayama/Team HI-AX	June 26, 2016
As Noboru's health improves, a revival celebration is held at ITOKAN to celebrate Noboru's release from the hospital. Members of Sannoh Rengokai (Hoodlum Squad) hopes that with the return of Noboru, Sannoh Rengokai (Hoodlum Squad) can also have its revival. What decision will Kobra make? Meanwhile, a mysterious man, 'Lee', approaches Kohaku, who has become desperate after the death of her best friend, Tatsuya. What is his plan? The balance of the SWORD area is slowly collapsing.

== Reception ==
=== Critical response ===
Japanese online streaming service dTV introduced the drama as impressive and points out that the most appealing part of the drama is its action scenes, beautifully performed with the exercised flesh of Exile Tribe's member. They wrote that " Powerful action scenes just keep coming and coming, which makes the drama overall compelling. At first, you may complain that there are too many fights, but as your eyes get used to it, it would make you feel like you were there and even makes you cheer for them before you realize it. It's a fun feeling of being in the middle of something. Meanwhile, these action scenes also make the best use of the actors' characteristics."

dTV was also impressed by the production design of the drama, writing that "One of the most memorable scenes is the appearance of the Rude Boys, who are located in an area that makes you wonder if there are any Rude Boys in Japan. Such ruins and abandoned factory scenes also feel like they cost a lot of money and are very impressive."
