= Bump.y =

Japanese girl idol group

bump.y
- Origin: Japan
- Genres: J-pop; pop
- Years active: 2009–2014
- Labels: Sony Music Records (2010–2012); Pony Canyon (2012–2014)
- Past members: Mary Matsuyama; Nanami Sakuraba; Sara Takatsuki; Mio Miyatake; Matsuri Miyatake; Hikari Kikuzato
- Website: www.bump-y.com

bump.y is a girl idol group, founded in 2009 by Sweet Power (スウィートパワー).

The concept of the group is to bring six actresses together as an idol group; the group's name is an acronym and each member's attributed characteristic is supposed to correspond to each component of the acronym: Brilliant, Universal, Miracle, Power, the period is intended to represent "moving freely", and finally Youthful. The group "graduated" in end of June 2014.

== Members ==
=== Current members ===
- Mary Matsuyama (松山 メアリ, Matsuyama Meari), born September 2, 1991 (age 34)
- Nanami Sakuraba
- Sara Takatsuki
- Mio Miyatake (宮武 美桜, Miyatake Mio), born May 11, 1996 (age 30)
- Matsuri Miyatake (宮武 祭, Miyatake Matsuri), born June 1, 1999 (age 26)

== Discography ==
=== Singles ===
==== CD singles ====
#	Title	Release date	Charts	Album
#	Title	Release date	Oricon Weekly Singles Chart	Album
#	Title	Release date	Top position	Album
1	"voice"	August 25, 2010	50	—
2	"Futari no Hoshi ~Hanarete Itemo~" (2人の星〜離れていても〜)	November 24, 2010	48	—
3	"Sotsugyo Made ni..." (卒業までに・・・)	March 2, 2011	30	—
4	"kiss!"	August 10, 2011	25	—
5	"Gotta Getcha"	June 20, 2012	35	—
6	"Cosmo no Hitomi" (COSMOの瞳)	January 16, 2013	23	—
7	"Savage Heaven"	July 24, 2013	29	—
8	"pinpoint"	December 18, 2013		

==== Digital singles ====
#	Title	Release date	Album
1	"Smileflower"	June 1, 2011	—
