= The Master Plan (2021 film) =

- Film poster

Japanese name
- Kanji: 名も無き世界のエンドロール
Transcriptions
- Revised Hepburn: Na mo Naki Sekai no End Roll
- Directed by: Yūichi Satō
- Written by: Mitsutoshi Saijo
- Based on: Na mo Naki Sekai no End Roll by Kaoru Yukinari
- Produced by: Kentaro Uchibe; Takuro Nagai; Satoko Kashikawa
- Starring: Takanori Iwata; Arata Mackenyu
- Cinematography: Ryuto Kondo
- Edited by: Takuya Taguchi
- Music by: Naoki Satō
- Production companies: Kyodo Television; RIKI Project
- Distributed by: Avex Pictures
- Release date: 29 January 2021
- Running time: 100 minutes
- Country: Japan
- Language: Japanese

The Master Plan (Japanese: 名も無き世界のエンドロール, Hepburn: Na mo Naki Sekai no End Roll; also known as The End of the Tiny World) is a 2021 Japanese suspense-drama film. Based on Kaoru Yukinari's 2013 novel of the same title (published by Shueisha), the film is directed by Yuichi Sato, written by Mitsutoshi Saijo, and stars Takanori Iwata and Arata Mackenyu. It tells the story of Kida (Iwata) and Makoto (Arata), who grow up together and share a powerful bond. As former outcasts, they spend a decade fighting tooth and nail to reach the apex of the underworld and legit society respectively, so that Makoto can propose to a certain rich and powerful woman. However, the proposal on Christmas Eve turns out to be an epic scheme involving all of Japan.

The film is distributed by Avex Pictures and was released in Japan on January 29, 2021.

== Plot ==
Kida and Makoto are childhood friends who both grew up without parents. The two become friends with transfer student Yocchi, who shares the same experience. They lead a happy life growing up together, however, when they turn 20, "an incident" completely wrecks their lives and Yocchi suddenly disappears from the lives of Kida and Makoto.

Following this, Lisa, the daughter of a politician and a top model in the entertainment industry appears. Makoto takes an unusual interest in Lisa and invites her out to dinner, but she doesn't take any notice of him. Kida advises him to give up on her because she lives in a different world, but Makoto quits his job and disappears without a trace.

Two years later, Kida has entered the criminal world to find Makoto, and finally meets him again with the help of his boss. Makoto has been dying to earn money to become a man worthy of Lisa. When Kida learns of Makoto's obsession and the reason behind it, he vows to risk his life to help his best friend. Since then, Kida has been working as a "dark negotiator" who uses whatever means for his purposes, and Makoto becomes the president of a trading company, the two of them rising to the top of the underworld and the legit society respectively. Finally, the fatal night of Christmas Eve comes. Makoto plans to propose to Lisa with Kida's help. But in fact, it is a grand plan that these two have spent 10 year hatching to take revenge on the twisted society which changed their fates.

== Cast ==
- Takanori Iwata as Kida
- Mackenyu Arata as Makoto
- Anna Yamada as Yocchi
- Anne Nakamura as Lisa
- Kenjirō Ishimaru as Ando
- Kohei Otomo as Miyazawa
- Akira Emoto as Kawabata

== Release ==
The film was released in Japan on January 29, 2021.

=== Marketing ===
The film was announced on June 16, 2020, as the film adaption of the award-winning novel of the same title. It was the first time that Takanori Iwata and Arata Mackenyu starred in the same film. On August 25, Anna Yamada was announced to be the heroine, playing Kida and Makoto's childhood friend Yocchi. On September 7, 2021, Anne Nakamura was announced to have joined the cast as Lisa, the spoiled daughter of a politician. The first trailer of the film was released on September 17, 2020, with a new poster. On October 22, with the release of more stills and the official poster, it was announced that the theme song of the film would be "Loose" by Keina Suda, who wrote the song based on his impression of the film after seeing it. The song was first released on November 17 in a new trailer for the film. On December 18, a spin-off drama, Re:Na mo Naki Sekai no End Roll~Half a Year Later~ was announced, with its first wave of stills ready for the audiences. A video of the opening scenes of a fatal Christmas Eve in the film was released on December 24, 2020, to celebrate Christmas Eve. A greeting event celebrating the completion of the film was held on January 7, 2021, in Tokyo, with director Yuichi Sato and Takanori Iwata, Mackenyu Arata, Anna Yamada, and Anne Nakamura attending. Another 3 minute cut of the film showing Takanori Iwata(as Kida) holding a gun was released on January 14, 2021. A special event praying for the sales of the film was held at Kanda Shrine on January 20, 2021. Director Yuichi Sato attended the event with the main cast. A screening event was held on the same day, before a special movie of the making of the film was released on the next day, showing Takanori Iwata and Arata Mackenyu in school uniforms. On January 29, director Yuichi Sato and Takanori Iwata, Mackenyu Arata, Anna Yamada, and Anne Nakamura attended the greeting event that celebrated the release of the film in Tokyo, with the event live streamed to 314 cinema around Japan.

== Spin-off ==
=== Re:Na mo Naki Sekai no End Roll~Half a Year Later~ ===
Re:Na mo Naki Sekai no End Roll~Half a Year Later~ is a spin-off drama about the life of Kida half a year after the end of the film. Based on a script by Hikari Souma and directed by Yuichi Sato, the drama was released on online streaming service dTV on the same day as the film released in theatres.
