= One Missed Call 2 =

2005 film by Renpei Tsukamoto

- Directed by: Renpei Tsukamoto
- Written by: Yasushi Akimoto; Minako Daira
- Produced by: Yoichi Arishige; Naoki Satō
- Starring: Mimura; Yū Yoshizawa; Renji Ishibashi; Haruko Wanibuchi; Peter Ho; Asaka Seto
- Cinematography: Tokusho Kikumura
- Edited by: Soichi Ueno
- Release date: February 5, 2005
- Running time: 105 minutes
- Country: Japan
- Language: Japanese

One Missed Call 2 (Japanese: 着信アリ2, Hepburn: Chakushin ari 2) is a 2005 Japanese horror film directed by Renpei Tsukamoto and a sequel to the 2004 film One Missed Call.

== Plot ==
Kindergarten teacher Kyoko Okudera is invited by her friend Madoka Uchiyama to dinner at a Chinese restaurant, where Kyoko's boyfriend Naoto Sakurai, a photographer's assistant, works part-time. The chef, Jianfeng Wang, intercepts the cursed phone call from his daughter Meifeng's phone, redirecting the curse towards him. Meifeng later arrives with a new phone and exchanges her new phone number with Kyoko and Madoka, with Madoka receiving the cursed call immediately afterward. Naoto heads to the kitchen and discovers Mr. Wang dead with half of his face burned off.

At the crime scene, journalist Takako Nozoe learns from Detective Yusaku Motomiya about traces of coal found in Mr. Wang's body as well as the fact that Yumi Nakamura is still declared missing ever since she killed Hiroshi Yamashita a year before. She personally questions Naoto the next day and tells him about the cursed call, the victims it claimed over the previous year, and its origin: Mimiko Mizunuma. Meanwhile, Kyoko's video chat with Madoka is interrupted when the former sees a black-haired figure about to reach her through the phone. She races to Madoka's residence but arrives too late to rescue her from being fatally mutilated in the shower. Shortly after Naoto and Takako arrive, Kyoko receives the cursed call.

To help solve the case, Motomiya orders autopsies on all cursed call victims, including Mimiko, all of whom show positive results of having traces of coal dust. Meanwhile, Kyoko, Naoto, and Takako visit Mimiko's grandmother Sachie, who describes that Mimiko was conceived after her mother Marie was raped by a crazed intruder. Marie's father Wei Zhang, a Taiwanese immigrant, caught the rapist and stabbed him to death. While serving his term in prison, he felt chased by a little girl and decided to move to his hometown of Taipei after his release. Takako contacts her estranged husband, Yuting Chen, who lives in Taipei, and from him learns that similar deaths related to cursed calls also happen all over Taiwan. Takako flies to Taipei to personally visit Wei, only to find his rotten corpse holding a cellphone.

Kyoko and Naoto decide to assist Takako in resolving the curse; she informs them that she found that the curse originally started from an abandoned coal mining town. The town's only surviving resident, Shumei Gao, recounts that a bullied girl named Li Li had developed the power to verbally curse someone into imminent death. The enraged town residents sewed her mouth shut and sealed her alive in the mines. Takako then receives a call from Yuting, who has received the cursed call himself.

Heading to the town, the trio split up. Motomiya notifies Takako, explaining that Yumi Nakamura's body has been found and that she was actually evil all along, rather than being possessed by Mimiko, before the call abruptly cuts off. Takako heads into an open mine, encounters Mimiko, and is incapacitated. After awakening from a dream where she rescues her twin sister Mariko, who died after receiving the cursed call many years ago, from answering a ringing payphone, she dashes to Yuting's apartment, arriving exactly when his time of death is to occur, but nothing happens; she concludes that Mariko's spirit has rescued them. Meanwhile, Naoto manages to free Kyoko, who has been trapped by Li Li, but upon realizing that Li Li will never release Kyoko, he sacrifices himself by answering Kyoko's incoming phone call and replacing her, devastating Kyoko.

Takako becomes increasingly suspicious upon hearing that Motomiya perished in a car crash the day before while en route to confirm Yumi's corpse. Simultaneously, Kyoko becomes perplexed when Detectives Lin and Huang of the Taipei Police reveal two bodies were found in the mines earlier that night. At Yuting's apartment, Takako discovers that he has been repeatedly stabbed with a knife in the bathroom, which she learns from video camera footage is her own doing. Checking her cellphone, she discovers that she had also received the cursed call at 5:58 PM; noticing the current time is 8:05 PM, she realizes Mimiko killed her in the mines before using her image to kill Yuting. Spitting out a red hard candy, she smiles and drops it as the death ringtone plays.

== Cast ==
- Mimura as Kyoko Okudera (奥寺 杏子, Okudera Kyōko)
- Yū Yoshizawa as Naoto Sakurai (桜井 尚人, Sakurai Naoto)
- Chisun as Madoka Uchiyama (内山 まどか, Uchiyama Madoka)
- Asaka Seto as Takako Nozoe (野添 孝子, Nozoe Takako)
- Peter Ho as Chen Yuting (陳 雨亭 (チェン・ユーティン, Chen Yūtin)
- Shadow Liu as Wang Meifeng (王 美鳳 (ワン・メイフォン), Wan Meifon)
- Hakobu Okubo as Wang Jianfeng (王 健峰 (ワン・ジェンフォン), Wan Jenfon)
- Karen Oshima as Mimiko Mizunuma (水沼 美々子, Mizunuma Mimiko)
- Nana Koizumi as Li Li (李 麗 (リー・リィー), Rī Ryī)
- Toshie Kobayashi as Gao Shumei (高 淑梅 (ガオ・スウメイ), Gao Sūmei)
- Mariko Tsutsui as Marie Mizunuma (水沼 マリエ, Mizunuma Marie)
- Renji Ishibashi as Yusaku Motomiya (本宮 勇作, Motomiya Yūsaku)
- Haruko Wanibuchi as Sachie Mizunuma (水沼 サチエ, Mizunuma Sachie)

Kou Shibasaki, Shinichi Tsutsumi, Kazue Fukiishi, Anna Nagata, Atsushi Ida, and Kana Ito additionally appear as Yumi Nakamura, Hiroshi Yamashita, Natsumi Konishi, Yoko Okazaki, Kenji Kawai, and Rina Tsuchiya, respectively, through archive footage from the first film.
