= Mizuki Yamamoto =

Japanese actress and model (born 1991)

- 山本 美月
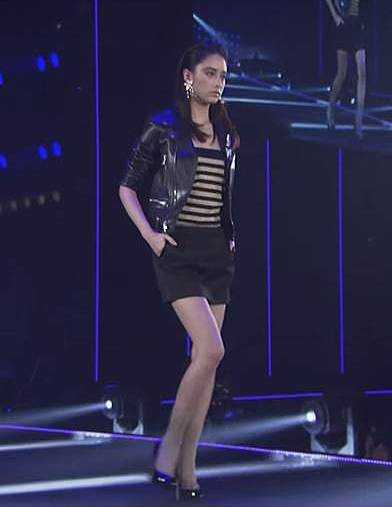
- Yamamoto in 2015
- Born: 18 July 1991 (age 35); Fukuoka, Japan
- Education: Meiji University
- Occupations: Actress; model
- Years active: 2009–present
- Agent: Incent
- Known for: The Kirishima Thing; Black Butler
- Height: 1.67 m (5 ft 5 1/2 in)
- Spouse: Kōji Seto (m. 2020)
- Children: 1
- Website: Agency profile

Mizuki Yamamoto (山本 美月, Yamamoto Mizuki; born July 18, 1991) is a Japanese actress and model.

== Career ==
Yamamoto was born in Fukuoka Prefecture. She started her career as an exclusive model for the women's fashion magazine CanCam in 2009. Two years later, she made her acting debut in the Fuji TV drama Shiawase ni Narōyo.

She also appears in various television commercials. In 2011, she was chosen as the image character for Samantha Thavasa. On August 11, 2012, she made her film debut playing Kirishima's girlfriend in The Kirishima Thing. From 2012 to 2014, she hosted the NTV's variety show Woman on the Planet.

In 2014, she graduated from Meiji University where she studied life science.

== Personal life ==
On 7 August 2020, Yamamoto married her costar in TV dramas Hope: Kitai Zero no Shinnyu Shain and Perfect World, Kōji Seto.

On 29 January 2023, Yamamoto announced her pregnancy. On 16 May 2023, she gave birth to their first child.

== Appearances ==
=== TV dramas ===
- Shiawase ni Narōyo Episode 6-7 (Fuji TV, 2011), Emi Kirishima
- The Quiz (NTV, 2012), Hitomi Arisato
- Doctor X: Gekai Daimon Michiko (TV Asahi, 2012), Rie Koike
- Piece – Kanojo no Kioku Episode 10-11 (NTV, 2012), Kumi
- Summer Nude (Fuji TV, 2013), Aoi Horikiri
- Andō Lloyd: A.I. knows Love? (TBS, 2013), Kaoru Kuriyama
- Boku no Ita Jikan (Fuji TV, 2014), Hina Murayama
- Aoi Honō (TV Tokyo, 2014), Tonko Morinaga
- Oyaji no Senaka Episode 2 (TBS, 2014), Arisa Takajō
- Hell Teacher Nūbē (NTV, 2014), Izuna Hazuki
- 64 (NHK, 2015), Shiori Mikumo
- Koinaka (Fuji TV, 2015), Mirei Tominaga
- Rinshō Hanzai Gakusha Himura Hideo no Suiri (NTV, 2016), Akemi Kijima
- Hope: Kitai Zero no Shinnyu Shain (Fuji TV, 2016), Akane Katsuki
- Uso no Sensou (Fuji TV, 2017), Kaede Nishina
- Detective Yugami (Fuji TV, 2017), Hizumi
- The Midnight Supercar (NHK, 2018), Shirayuki
- The Count of Monte-Cristo: Great Revenge (Fuji TV, 2018), Sumire Meguro
- Kono Manga ga Sugoi! (TV Tokyo, 2018), Utena Tenjou
- Idaten (NHK, 2019), Honjō
- Les Misérables: Owarinaki Tabiji (Fuji TV, 2019), Yui Fuwa
- The Lone Scalpel (WOWOW, 2019), Shoko Okawa
- Perfect World (Fuji TV, 2019), Tsugumi Kawana

=== Films ===
- The Kirishima Thing (2012), Risa Īda
- Zekkyō Gakkyū (2013), Yomi
- Daily Lives of High School Boys (2013), Yanagin
- Hunter × Hunter: The Last Mission (2013), Rengoku
- Black Butler (2014), Rin
- Tokyo Nanmin (2014), Rui Kawabe
- Jossy's (2014), Sumire Konno/Navy
- Close Range Love (2014), Kikuko Nanami
- Onodera no Otouto, Onodera no Ane (2014), Kaoru Okano
- Pikachu to Pokémon Ongakutai (2015), narrator
- Tokyo PR Woman (2015), Rena Misaki
- I am a Monk (2015), Kyoko Ochi
- Sadako vs. Kayako (2016), Yūri Kurahashi/Sadakaya
- Night's Tightrope (2016), Atsuko Kusano
- Peach Girl (2017), Momo Adachi
- Last Winter, We Parted (2018), Yuriko Matsuda
- My Friend "A" (2018), Kiyomi Sugimoto
- Hugtto! Pretty Cure Futari wa Pretty Cure: All Stars Memories (2018), Reporter (voice)
- The Fable (2019), Misaki
- Threads: Our Tapestry of Love (2020), Reiko Takagi
- The Untold Tale of the Three Kingdoms (2020), Younger Qiao
- The Fable: The Killer Who Doesn't Kill (2021), Misaki
- Immersion (2023), Tamaki Sonoda
- Once Upon a Crime (2023)
- Saint Young Men: The Movie (2024), Mara's oldest daughter
- Under the Big Onion (2025), Saki Shinoda

=== Web dramas ===
- Kyō Kara Hitman (dTV, 2014), Chinatsu
- Uchū no Shigoto (Amazon prime, 2016), Alien Somiaru
- Tokyo Alice (Amazon prime, 2017), Fuu Arisugawa
- Gintama 2: Yonimo Kimyou na Gintama-chan (dTV, 2018), Maetel
- 星 から 来 た あなた My Love from the Stars (Amazon Original, KyodoTV 2022)
- Even Though We're Adults (Hulu, 2025), Ayano Ōkubo

=== Stage ===
- Kaidan Nise Sara Yashiki (Aoyama Theatre, 19 June 2014 – 23 June 2014) as Okiku

=== Music video appearances ===
- Moumoon - Yey (2010) with Aiku Maikawa, Mew Azama, Hazuki Tsuchiya
- Cliff Edge - Endless Tears feat. Maiko Nakamura (2011)
- Nerdhead - Tomorrow feat. Hiroko from Mihimaru GT (2012)
- Back Number - Watagashi (2012)

== Bibliography ==
=== Photobooks ===
- Mizuki (Takarajimasha, 15 December 2018). ISBN 978-4800284136.

=== Calendars ===
- 2015 Mizuki Yamamoto Calendar (Shogakukan, 21 November 2014). ISBN 978-4091057617.
- 2016 Mizuki Yamamoto Calendar (Shogakukan, 21 November 2015). ISBN 978-4091057716.

=== Magazines ===
- CanCam, Shogakukan 1982–, as an exclusive model from December 2009 to September 2017

== Awards ==
- 1st Tokyo Supermodel Contest (2009): won
