= Takanori Iwata =

Japanese dancer and actor (born 1989)

Takanori Iwata 岩田 剛典
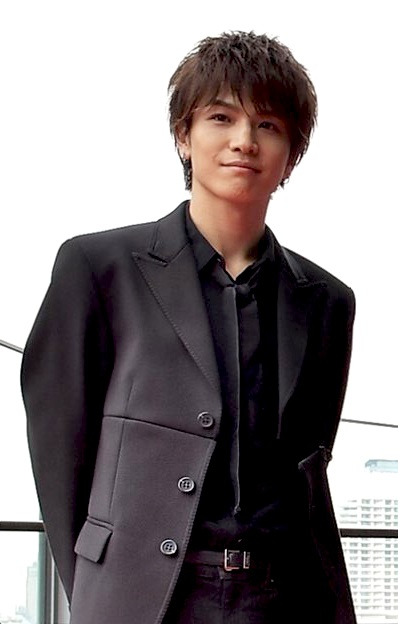
- Iwata at SSFF Asia 2018

Background information
- Also known as: Gun; Boi Twiggz; Gun-chan
- Born: 6 March 1989 (age 37); Nagoya, Aichi Prefecture, Japan
- Origin: Keio Futsubu School; Keio Senior High School; Keio University
- Genre: J-pop
- Occupations: Dancer; actor; singer
- Years active: 2010–present
- Label: Rhythm Zone
- Website: Official website

Takanori Iwata (岩田 剛典, Iwata Takanori; born March 6, 1989, in Nagoya, Aichi Prefecture, Japan) is a Japanese dancer and actor. He performs with the J-pop groups Sandaime J Soul Brothers and Exile. As a member of Sandaime J Soul Brothers, he has received the Japan Record Awards twice. He earned his first leading role as an actor in the film Shokubutsu Zukan ("Evergreen Love") in 2016, which won him the "Newcomer of the Year Award" at the 40th Japan Academy Film Prize. Since then, he has appeared in many more television dramas and films. In 2019, he starred as Junichi Wakamiya, the Japanese version of Dr. Watson, in Fuji TV's drama Sherlock: Untold Stories.

On September 15, 2021, he debuted as a singer with the single "Korekara".

Takanori Iwata is a graduate of Keio University. His nickname is Gun-chan (がんちゃん, Gan-chan).

== Biography ==
=== Early life ===
Takanori Iwata was born into an upper-class family in Nagoya on March 6, 1989. Both his grandfather and father are graduates of Keio University, so he was expected to follow the family's tradition. To live up to such an expectation, he started to attend juku ("cram school") after classes when he was still in elementary school while also meeting with a tutor at home at the same time. Eventually, he successfully enrolled in Keio Futsubu School (an all-male junior high school) and moved from Nagoya to Tokyo with his mother to attend it. He was admitted to Keio Senior High School subsequently, and began to play Lacrosse as an extra-curricular activity. He chose Lacrosse because it is only available as an extra-curricular activity for high school or higher education, so he thought he could have what it took to play on the same level as everyone else. He even made it to the short list of the Japan national Lacrosse team for the AFC U-19 Championship.

Iwata started dancing (Krumping) after seeing RIZE, an American documentary film about Clowning and Krumping. He used "GUN" as his stage name, which is another pronunciation for the first character (岩) of his first name Iwata (岩田). He performed publicly for the first time at the cultural festival in his senior 3, and he was so overwhelmed by the elation of dancing that he decided to quit Lacrosse and focused on dancing in university. After his enrollment in the Faculty of Law at Keio University, Iwata joined Dancing Crew JADE, a dance club on campus, and later became its 22nd leader. He met Krump dance group Twiggz Fam at a dance battle event held by JUN aka Twiggz, the pioneer of the Japanese Krump scene. He joined the group after the event and used the alias Boi Twiggz as a member of Twiggz Fam. In 2009, he also participated in 2009 Mr Keio Contest, an event whose winners are determined via online voting.

=== Career ===
Iwata did not initially pursue a career in dancing. Like any other normal university students, he already had a job offer from a big company in his final year of university. However, as LDH announced that they wanted to revive J Soul Brothers and form Sandaime J Soul Brothers ("The Third Generation of J Soul Brothers") in July 2010, Naoki Kobayashi, the appointed leader of the new group and Iwata's friend from Twiggz Fam, invited him to participate in the audition for performers of Sandaime J Soul Brothers. On 18 September, at the rehearsal for Exile's Exile Live Tour 2010 'Fantasy' in Noevir Stadium Kobe, Hiro, producer of Sandaime J Soul Brothers, announced that Iwata had passed the audition and was selected as one of the performers of the group. Despite the objection of his parents, Iwata declined the job offer he previously got from a big company and pursued a career in the world of entertainment instead.

On September 27, 2010, Iwata made his first public appearance as a performer of Sandaime J Soul Brothers during the Fantasy Goya-sai: Exile Tamashī (FANTASY後夜祭～EXILE魂～; FANTASY Late Night Festival ~EXILE Soul~) live performance from Exile at Toyota Stadium. On 10 November, Iwata made his major debut as a member of Sandaime J Soul Brothers with the release of the group's first single, "Best Friend's Girl", which debuted at number three on the Oricon Singles Chart. At the time of his debut, he was still a university student. He graduated in March, 2011.

In September 2013, Iwata started his acting career with the play "Attack No.1". In 2014, he was cast in his first film role, playing the grotesquely scarred Hiroki Shibata, head of Kurosaki Industrial in Toshiaki Toyoda's Crows Explode, a sequel to 2007's Crows Zero and 2009's Crows Zero 2. On March 6, 2014, his 25th birthday, Iwata released his first photo-book G Takanori Iwata Sandaime J Soul Brothers from Exile Tribe. Meanwhile, on April 27, 2014, Iwata was chosen to join Exile as a new performer along with four othernew members after he won the "EXILE PERFORMER BATTLE AUDITION" final held in Nippon Budokan. He joined Exile while remaining a member of Sandaime J Soul Brothers. In October of the same year, he appeared with Satomi Ishihara and Nao Matsushita in Fuji TV's drama Dear Sister, in which he played Eito Sakuraba("Hachi"), the best friend of Satomi Ishihara's character Misaki's best friend. As his character was dreaming of becoming a professional skateboarder, Iwata spent lots of time practicing skateboarding to finish the skateboard tricks in the drama.

In 2015, Iwata appeared in two NTV dramas, Wild Heroes in April and High＆Low: The Story of S.W.O.R.D. in October. Starring alongside Exile Tribe's members Takahiro, Sho Aoyagi, Shuhei Nogae, Masayasu Yagi, Taiki Sato, and Keiji Kuroki, he played Harutaro Saeki("Choko"), a former bad boy and a handsome Karaoke manager who was loved by all older women in town in Wild Heroes. On 21 October, the first season of the drama High＆Low: The Story of S.W.O.R.D. was broadcast, which was part of the High&Low franchise, the action and music franchise produced by the Exile Tribe. Iwata played Cobra, leader of Sanno Hoodlum Squad, which was one of the gangs that controlled the S.W.O.R.D. area in the world of the High&Low franchise. As the High&Low franchise continued to produce more films, concerts, games, manga in the following years, Iwata continued to reprise his role in those follow-ups. On 15 October, Iwata teamed up with Sandaime J Soul Brothers' vocalist Hiroomi Tosaka and performer Naoki Kobayashi to form dance and vocal group The Sharehappi from Sandaime J Soul Brothers from Exile Tribe, and released their one and only single, Share The Love, which is a theme song used in the advertisement for Pocky. The Pocky Dance (Pocky Sharehappi Dance) used in the song and the Pocky advertisement became quite a national hit as people around the country continual to imitate the dance move.

In 2016, Iwata appeared opposite Mitsuki Takahata in the romance film Shokubutsu Zukan ("Evergreen Love"). As the mysterious herbs lover Itsuki, he fell in love with Mitsuki Takahata 's character Sayaka, an office girl. This was the first time he got a leading role in a film, for which he won many awards, including the Best New Artist Award at the 41st Hochi Film Awards, the New Actor Award at the 26TH Japan Movie Critics Awards, and the Newcomer of the Year Award as well as Popularity Award at the 40th Japan Academy Film Prize for his role as Itsuki. He also appeared in the TBS's TV drama Suna no Tou ("Tower of Sand") as Kohei Ubukata, the childhood friend of heroin Aki.

In 2017, Iwata got a lead role in Fate Detector, one of the four mystery stories of Yo Nimo kimyô na Monogatari: Autumn 2017 Special. He also reprised his role as Cobra in the film High&Low The Movie 2 / End Of Sky released in August and High&Low The Movie 3 / Final Mission released in November.

Iwata appeared in more TV dramas and films in 2018. He played the lead character in the short film Swan Song, one of the stories of the anthology film Cinema Fighters released on 26 January. (Cinema Fighters is a joint project by Exile Hiro, Tetsuya Bessho, who is the representative director of SSFF & ASIA, and lyricist Masato Odake.). He also starred in the film Kyonen no Fuyu, Kimi to Wakare ("Last Winter We Parted") as Kyosuke Yakumo, the freelance writer looking for the truth behind a burned to death murder case involving a beautiful blind woman. The film was released on 10 March. On 15 April, Gakeppuchi Hoteru ("Hotel on the Brink") began to broadcast, in which he led as Deputy Manager Naoya Ukai of "Hotel Grande Inversao", the mysterious man who saved the hotel from bankruptcy. This was his first lead role in a TV drama. He also appeared in Naomi Kawase's Vision, a film starred by Juliette Binoche and released on June 8, 2019. On 22 June, the anthology film Uta Monogatari: Cinema Fighters Project, the second film of the Cinema Fighters project, was released. Iwata starred in one of the six stories of the anthology, Funky, which was directed and written by Yuya Ishii. Then, co-starred with Hana Sugusaki, he appeared in the romance film Perfect World, which was released on 5 October. The romance was based on the manga of the same title by Rie Aruga, which depicted a love story between office girl Tsugumi Kawana and her disable lover, Itsuki Ayukawa, who was bound to the wheelchair after an accident. Iwata spent lots of time practicing how to use a wheelchair properly and learned about the life of disabled people, while he also learned to play wheelchair basketball. At the end of the year, he appeared as Akira Baba in TV special Enjo Bengonin ("Attorney for the Flamed") alongside Yôko Maki and Riisa Naka. He won the Yujiro Ishihara Newcomer Award at The 31st Nikkan Sports Film Award for his performance in Last Winter We Parted, Vision and Perfect World.

In 2019, Iwata appeared in Yuya Ishii's Machida-kun no Sekai (Almost a Miracle). Although he turned 30 this year, he played a high school student, who was also a boy model and the popular kid in school, in the unique world of the film. He published his third photo-book Spin on 2 August, which was photographed by his Vision co-star, Japanese actor and photographer Masatoshi Nagase. The photo-book was so popular that a second impression was announced even before the book official release day on 2 August. In July, Iwata was cast in Fuji TV's drama Sherlock, a Japanese adaption of Sir Arthur Conan Doyle's Sherlock Holmes. The story was about a Sherlock Holmes based in modern Tokyo, and Iwata portrayed Junichi Wakamiya, a psychiatrist and the Japanese version of Dr. Watson. His character got this slightly unusual name so that the abbreviation for the name would be J.W., the same as John H. Watson. The TV drama started broadcasting on October 7, 2019.

In 2020, Iwata appeared in Yu Irie's new original film AI Collapse (AI Houkai) as Elite Police officer Makoto Sakuraba, who focused on cybercrime. The film was released on January 31, 2020. He also appeared in Shinji Aoyama's Living in the Sky, in which he played actor Morinori Tokito, who started a relationship with the heroin. The film was released on 23 October. Starting with the July issue of Elle Japan, which went on sale on 28 May, Iwata landed a regular column "ASK! Gun-chan: Takanori Iwata's Counseling Room" on the magazine to answer all kinds of questions from readers. He also made a guest appearance in crime drama Cold Case: Shinjitsu no Tobira's third season alongside Kasumi Arimura as Kouharu Shiromoto, the head of publicity who supports the famous actress Misa Takifune behind the scenes. The episode was broadcast on 5 December. He played Zhao Yun in Fukuda Yuichi's The Untold Tale of the Three Kingdoms, which was released on 11 December. Apart from acting, he also works as a voice actor to read the diaries left by a young soldier who lost his life in a suicide mission in the last days of the Pacific War in"Kamikaze: Why did those young men take off?", which was aired on 11 December and is an episode of the NHK documentary show Historical Anecdote.

On January 29, 2021, the suspense film Na mo Naki Sekai no End Roll (The End of the Nameless World, The Master Plan), starring Iwata as Kida, a fatherless and motherless "black market bargaining house", was released. On the same day, the spin-off drama Re: The End of the Nameless World ~Half a Year Later was broadcast on Japanese streaming service platform dTV. On September 15, 2021, he debuted as a singer with the single korekara.

== Personal life ==
Iwata got fairly good grades as a student and was ranked top in the national mock examinations for elementary school students. He is a graduate of Keio University. When he was looking for jobs in his university day, one of the jobs he applied for was the position of NTV's anchor.

He is a fan of Christopher Nolan.

== Participating groups ==
- Sandaime J Soul Brothers from Exile Tribe (10 November 2010–present)
- Exile (27 April 2014–present)
- AG Pound (2015–present)
- The Sharehappi from Sandaime J Soul Brothers from Exile Tribe (2015–unknown)
- Twiggz Fam
- Street Kingdom Japan

== Filmography ==
=== TV series ===
Year	Title	Role	Notes	Ref.
2011	Rokudenashi Blues		Episode 7	
2014	Dear Sister	Eito Sakuraba		
2015	Senryoku-gai Sōsa-kan		2-hour special	
2015	Wild Heroes	Harutaro "Choco" Saeki		
2015	High&Low : The Story of S.W.O.R.D.	Junpei "Cobra" Hino		
2016	High&Low Season 2	Junpei "Cobra" Hino		
2016	Night Hero Naoto	Himself	Episode 1, 4, 10; ending dance (Episode 5)	
2016	Suna no Tou: Shiri Sugita Rinjin (Tower of Sand)	Kohei Ubukata		
2018	Gakeppuchi Hoteru (Hotel on the Brink)	Naoya Ukai	Lead role	
2018	Enjo Bengonin (Attorney for the Flamed)	Akira Baba	2-hour special	
2019	Sherlock: Untold Stories	Jun'ichi Wakamiya		
2020	Cold Case 3: Shinjitsu no Tobira	Shiromoto Mitsuharu (Young)	Episode 3	
2021	Promise Cinderella	Seigo Kataoka		
2022	Fishbowl Wives	Haruto		
2023	Even If You Don't Do It	Makoto Niina		
2024	The Tiger and Her Wings	Satoru Hanaoka	Asadora	
2024	Antihero	Keita Hiyama		
2025	Doctor Price	Kanenari Naruki	Lead role	
2025	Simulation: Defeat in the Summer of 1941	Kazumasa Murai	Miniseries	
2027	The Shogunate Rebel	Abe Masahiro	Taiga drama	

=== Film ===
Year	Title	Role	Notes	Ref.
2014	Crows Explode	Hiroki Shibata		
2016	Evergreen Love	Itsuki Kusakabe	Lead role	
2016	Road to High&Low	Junpei "Cobra" Hino		
2016	High&Low The Movie	Junpei "Cobra" Hino		
2016	High&Low The Red Rain	Junpei "Cobra" Hino		
2017	High&Low The Movie 2 / End of Sky	Junpei "Cobra" Hino		
2017	High&Low The Movie 3 / Final Mission	Junpei "Cobra" Hino		
2018	Last Winter, We Parted	Kyosuke Yakumo	Lead role	
2018	Vision	Rin		
2018	Perfect World	Itsuki Ayukawa	Lead role	
2019	Almost a Miracle	Yu Himuro		
2020	AI Amok	Makoto Sakuraba		
2020	The Untold Tale of the Three Kingdoms	Zhao Yun		
2020	Living in the Sky	Morinori Tokito		
2021	The Master Plan	Kida	Lead role	
2022	The Hound of the Baskervilles	Jun'ichi Wakamiya		
2022	Wedding High	Yūya Yashiro		
2022	Lesson in Murder	Itsuki Kanayama		
2023	Once Upon a Crime	Prince Gilbert		
2024	Saint Young Men: The Movie	Michael		
2025	Blonde (Note: World Premiere ar the TIFF on October 28)	Ichikawa	Lead role	
2025	New Interpretation of the End of Edo Period	Okada Izō		
2026	Bad Lieutenant: Tokyo		American-Japanese film	
2026	The Secret Battlefield	Kazumasa Murai		

=== Short films ===
Year	Title	Role	Notes	Ref.
2018	CINEMA FIGHTERS "SWAN SONG"	Asahi	Lead role	
2018	Uta Monogatari: Cinema Fighters Project-"Funky"	Junji	Lead role	

=== Stage ===
Year	Title	Role
2013	Gekidan Exile: Attack No. 1	Shigemichi Furuse
2013	Monsieur!	Eishi Tozaki

=== Voice acting ===
Year	Title	Role
2017	HiGH&LOW g-sword Animation DVD Special Edition	Cobra

=== Narration ===
Year	Title	Role	Notes	Ref.
2019	Historical Anecdote	Voice actor for	NHK	

=== Advertisements ===
Year	Title	Ref.
2014–2016	Samantha Thavasa	
2015–2018	Ezaki Glico "Pocky"	
2015–2016	Suntory The Malts	
2016	Yōfuku no Aoyama "Aoyama Prestige Technology"	
2016	SoftBank Spo Navi Live	
2018	Nissin (Cup Noodle)	
2018	24/7 Workout	
2018	Dip (Baitoru Next)	
2018	Ajinomoto AGF (Blendy) stick	
2018	UHA Mikakuto (Cororo)	
2018	Kosé sekkisei	
2019	NTT Docomo × AG POUND	
2019	Kirin beer	
2020	Yoshinoya	

=== Others ===
Year	Title	Role
2013	43rd Tokyo Motor Show Supporter Family Kuruma-ka no Hitobito	Takanori Kuruma
2016	Gentosha Bunko	20-shūnenkinen Fair character
2017	Movie " Dunkirk "	Ambassador
2018	Kosé sekkisei "SAVE the BLUE"	Project Ambassador
2019	Louis Vuitton	Ambassador

=== Dubbing ===
- Jurassic World Rebirth (Dr. Henry Loomis (Jonathan Bailey))

== Bibliography ==
=== Photobooks ===
Year	Title	Ref.
2014	G Takanori Iwata Sandaime J Soul Brothers from Exile Tribe	
2019	Spin	
2021	Layer〜Evolution from Spin and to the future〜	

=== Photo essays ===
Year	Title	Ref.
2016	Azzurro	

== Awards and nominations ==
Year	Organisation	Award	Work	Result	Ref.
2016	41st Hochi Film Awards	Best New Artist	Evergreen Love	Won	
2016	26th Japanese Movie Critics Awards	New Actor Award	Evergreen Love	Won	
2017	40th Japan Academy Film Prize	Newcomer of the Year	Evergreen Love	Won	
2017	40th Japan Academy Film Prize	Popularity Award	Evergreen Love	Won	
2018	43rd Hochi Film Awards	Best Actor	Last Winter, We parted / Perfect World	Nominated	
2018	31st Nikkan Sports Film Awards	Yūjirō Ishihara Newcomer Award	Last Winter, We Parted / Vision / Perfect World	Won	
