= Joshikō =

- Poster

Japanese name
- Kanji: 女子高
- Directed by: Kōki Yamamoto
- Screenplay by: Kōki Yamamoto
- Starring: Minami Minegishi
- Release date: April 9, 2016
- Running time: 100 minutes
- Country: Japan
- Language: Japanese

Joshikō (girl's high school) is a Japanese mystery suspense film written and directed by Kōki Yamamoto and starring Minami Minegishi. It was released on April 9, 2016.

== Cast ==
- Minami Minegishi as Katsuki Takahashi
- Riho Takada as Mifuyu Tachibana
- Haru Izumi as Natsumi Shirakawa
- Erina Nakayama as Takako Minefuji
- Shiori Kitayama as Erika Uchida
- Ayana Sōgawa as Arisa Kida
- Mika Ushio as Yuka Kawasaki
- Ami Tomite as Aki Yazawa
- Taiyo Ayukawa
- Ryohei Abe
- Toru Kazama
- Ruika
- Ryutaro Maeda

== Production ==
The theme song of the film is "Higurashi no Naku Koro ni feat. Senga Taro" by ET-KING.
