= Defying Kurosaki-kun =

Japanese manga series

- First volume cover

黒崎くんの言いなりになんてならない (Kurosaki-kun no Iinari ni Nante Naranai)
- Manga
- Written by: Makino
- Published by: Kodansha
- English publisher: Kodansha USA
- Magazine: Bessatsu Friend
- Original run: 2014 – 2021
- Volumes: 19
- Television drama
- Directed by: Hayato Kawai
- Written by: Yūko Matsuda
- Original network: Nippon TV
- Original run: December 22, 2015 – December 23, 2015
- Episodes: 2
- Live-action film

The Black Devil and the White Prince
- Directed by: Shō Tsukikawa
- Written by: Yūko Matsuda
- Music by: Tarō Makido
- Released: February 27, 2016
- Manga

Kurosaki-kun no Iinari ni Nante Naranai S
- Written by: Makino
- Published by: Kodansha
- Magazine: Palcy
- Original run: 2023 – present
- Volumes: 1
- icon

Defying Kurosaki-kun (黒崎くんの言いなりになんてならない, Kurosaki-kun no Iinari ni Nante Naranai; lit. "I'm Not Following Any of Kurosaki's Orders", alternatively titled The Black Devil and the White Prince internationally for the live-action adaptations) is a Japanese manga series written and illustrated by Makino. It was serialized in Kodansha's shōjo manga magazine Bessatsu Friend from 2014 to 2021.

A live-action film adaptation with the international title The Black Devil and the White Prince was released on February 27, 2016, with a short Japanese television drama mini-series in airing on Nippon TV in December 2015 to promote the film.

A sequel manga titled Kurosaki-kun no Iinari ni Nante Naranai S began serialization on Kodansha's Pixiv-based Palcy manga app in 2023.

== Characters ==
Yū Akabane (赤羽 由宇, Akabane Yū)
Voiced by: Mikako Komatsu; portrayed by: Nana Komatsu
She was bullied in her middle school years, thus resulting her to change. After being kissed by Haruto, she has become obedient to him. Unaware that she was already falling for him, she only remembers the bad things he made her do.
Haruto Kurosaki (黒崎 晴人, Kurosaki Haruto)
Voiced by: Kaito Ishikawa; portrayed by: Kento Nakajima
He is called the Black Prince since his hair was cut but Yū still calls him Black Demon. Even though he shows a bad expression, it is stated by Takumi that he is really kind. He stated that the only person he could never beat is Takumi.
Takumi Shirakawa (白河 タクミ, Shirakawa Takumi)
Voiced by: Kensho Ono; portrayed by: Yudai Chiba
He is called the White Prince because of his good attitude. When he found out that Haruto is interested in Yū, he treats her as a game but falls in love with her. He tells Haruto if Haruto and Yū becomes a couple, they won't be friends anymore. In the manga, Yuu called him a White Demon when she found out about him using her as a game.
Yūsuke Kaji (梶 祐介, Kaji Yūsuke)
Voiced by: Hiro Shimono; portrayed by: Yūta Kishi
He is a big fan of Haruto and is willing to do everything to please him. He stated that if he was a girl, he will fall in love with Haruto.
Meiko Ashigawa (芦川 芽衣子, Ashigawa Meiko)
Portrayed by: Sara Takatsuki
Meiko is Yuu's best friend. She is in love with Haruto ever since he saved her from the pool. When she found out that Yuu has feelings for him, She didn't want their friendship to be destroyed

== Media ==
=== Manga ===
- 1 (June 13, 2014)
- 2 (September 12, 2014)
- 3 (January 13, 2015)
- 4 (May 13, 2015)
- 5 (November 13, 2015)
- 6 (February 12, 2016)
- 7 (July 13, 2016)
- 8 (November 11, 2016)
- 9 (April 13, 2017)
- 10 (September 13, 2017)
- 11 (February 13, 2018)
- 12 (July 13, 2018)
- 13 (January 11, 2019)
- 14 (June 13, 2019)
- 15 (November 13, 2019)
- 16 (April 13, 2020)
- 17 (October 13, 2020)

=== Film ===
The film is also titled The Black Devil and the White Prince for international markets.

The theme song of the TV series and film is "Make my day" by Sexy Zone.

== Reception ==
Volume 3 reached the 27th place on the weekly Oricon manga charts, with 34,442 copies sold; volume 4 reached the 13th place and, as of May 24, 2015, had sold 60,592 copies; volume 5 reached the 12th place and, as of November 22, 2015, had sold 71,084 copies.

The film was number-one in admissions on its opening weekend in Japan, with 157,680, and number-two by gross, with US$1.67 million.
