= Shippu Rondo =

2016 book by Keigo Higashino

Shippū Rondo (Japanese: 疾風ロンド) is a 2016 Japanese action/comedy film directed by Teruyuki Yoshida based on the novel by Keigo Higashino. The movie was produced by Kazuma Kuryu and Takako Oki. Its release date was November 26, 2016. By the first screenings, the film had earned ¥103 million (US$0.917 million).

== Storyline ==
An employee of a University, of his own accord, creates a bio weapon (named "weapon K-55"). Upon being sacked for creating the weapon, he steals it from the laboratory. The university faces a challenge in that they can't contact the police, due to the weapon being created against protocol. The University laboratory then receives a message that the weapon will be deployed and used on the nation of Japan unless a huge ransom is paid. The laboratory staff agonises over what to do, but finally the manager of the lab, Akira Emoto selects one of the lab managers and senior researchers, Kazuyuki Kuribayashi (played by Hiroshi Abe) to try to retrieve the stolen bio weapon. Kazuyuki, a single father already dealing with family problems mainly caused by his son, also has to deal with the challenge of how to conduct a covert mission with no training. The extra challenge is, the weapon is hidden somewhere in a Ski Resort and Kazuyuki can't ski and is generally not athletic. Once at the resort, he forms an alliance with a local snowboarder Yuko Oshima and resort employee (Tadayoshi Okura) and with his son, tackles the challenge of finding the weapon.

== Cast ==
- Hiroshi Abe as Kazuyuki Kuribayashi
- Tadayoshi Okura
- Yuko Oshima
- Akira Emoto
- Taiyō Yoshizawa
- Tatsuomi Hamada
- Keiko Horiuchi
- Yumi Asō
- Tsuyoshi Muro
- Shigeyuki Totsugi
