= Sara Takatsuki =

Japanese actress

- 高月 彩良
- Born: 10 August 1997 (age 29); Kanagawa Prefecture, Japan
- Occupation: Actress
- Years active: 2008–present
- Agent: Sweet Power (2008-2025) Transworld Japan (2026–present)
- Height: 168 cm (5 ft 6 in)
- Website: https://www.transworldjapan.co.jp/

Sara Takatsuki (高月 彩良, Takatsuki Sara; born 10 August 1997) is a Japanese actress from Kanagawa Prefecture, Japan. She is represented by the agency Transworld Japan.

In July 2008, Sara Takatsuki was scouted in her hometown while on her way to swimming school. She subsequently joined Sweet Power and entered the entertainment industry. She has stated that she had no interest in the entertainment industry before being scouted. In September of the same year, she made her acting debut in the online drama TSC Tokyo Girl. In August 2009, she was selected to play the childhood version of the protagonist in the television drama Otomen. In October of that year, the idol group bump.y was formed. On August 25, 2010, bump.y made its major-label debut with the single "voice."

In April 2011, she made her stage debut in Shinsetsu Ten'ichibō Sōdō. In December 2012, she was selected through an audition from among 1,000 candidates to play the lead role in the stage production BASARA. This marked Takatsuki's first time starring in a stage production.

On June 30, 2014, she graduated from bump.y. In July of the same year, she voiced the protagonist, Anna Sasaki, in the animated film When Marnie Was There (Omoide no Marnie).

In 2015, she starred in Jinrō Game: Crazy Fox, marking her first leading role in a feature film.

She was scheduled to appear in the stage production Jujutsu Kaisen 0 WITH LIVE BAND, which began performances on December 13, 2024. However, she had to withdraw from the production after experiencing a recurrence of her pre-existing herniated disc condition. Rina Takeda was appointed as her replacement.

On September 30, 2025, she announced that she would be leaving Sweet Power, the agency she had been affiliated with for 17 years, effective that day.

On November 1, 2026, she announced that she had joined the entertainment agency Transworld Japan.

== Biography ==
Takatsuki made her acting debut in the television drama "TSC Tokyo Girl" in September 2008. She was a member of the idol group, bump.y from 2009 to 2014.

== Filmography ==
=== Film ===
Year	Title	Role	Notes	Ref.
2009	Yoru no Kuchibue	Kana Uchida		
2012	Joker Game	Kana Ōno		
2013	GOGO♂ Ikemen 5	Rima Sakota		
2013	Joker Game Escape	Kana Ōno		
2013	Daily Lives of High School Boys	Mei Tadakuni		
2014	Haganai	Yukimura Kusunoki		
2014	When Marnie Was There	Anna	Lead Voice Role	
2015	Strayer's Chronicle	Shizuka		
2015	The Werewolf Game: Crazy Fox	Ayaka Morii		
2016	Defying Kurosaki-kun	Meiko Ashigawa		
2019	Fly Me to the Saitama	Group A Girls		
2019	L-DK: Two Loves, Under One Roof	Moe Shibuya		
2020	Flight on the Water	Michiru Murakami		
2022	My Boyfriend in Orange			
2024	Last Turn	Kaori Kishimoto		

=== Television ===
Year	Title	Role	Notes	Ref.
2008	TSC Tokyo Girl	Saya Mishiro		
2009	Otomen -natsu-	Asuka Masamune		
2009	Otomen -aki-	Asuka Masamune		
2009	Shōkōjo Seira	Makoto Asahina		
2010	Tōbō Bengoshi	Yūki Minami		
2011	Saijō no Meii	Nasuka Sawa	Ep. 3	
2012	Black Board -Jidai to Tatakatta Kyōshitachi-	Mitsue Yamamoto		
2012	GTO	Haruka Kuwae		
2013	Toshi Densetsu no Onna	Ayano Hamanaka		
2014	Black President	Natsumi Matsumura		
2014	Hell Teacher Nūbē	Shizuka Kikuchi		
2015	Itsutsuboshi Tourist: Saikō no Tabi, Goannai Shimasu!	Momiji Sawamura		
2016	Juhan Shuttai!	Kinu Agarie		
2016	The Girl Who Leapt Through Time	Miho Matsuyama	Ep. 2	
2016	Ishikawa Goemon	Katada no Kosuzume		
2017	Gin to Kin	Mio Itō		
2017	Kirawareru Yūki	Megumi Nishina	Ep. 3	
2017	Osaka Kanjōsen Part 2	Yuki Enami	Ep. 3	
2017	Tokyo Vampire Hotel	M	Ep. 2	
2017	Nō ni Sumaho ga Umerareta	Asahina		
2017	Ima kara Anata wo Kyōhaku Shimasu	Eru Tachibana	Ep. 2	
2017	Kataomoi	Mutsumi Suenaga		
2018	Izakaya Bottakuri	Kaoru		
2018	Myubu	Eimi Ōtsuru		
2020	Kuroi Gashū 〜 Shogen 〜	Saki Sugiyama		
2020	13	Misa Matsuoka		
2020	Something's Wrong with Us	Misuzu Matsubara	Ep. 4–5	
2021	Hoshi ni Naritakatta Kimi to	Shiori Kotosaka		
2021	Kyojo 2	Shinya Domoto		

=== Theatre ===
Year	Title	Role	Notes	Ref.
2011	Shinsetsu Tennichibousoudou	Chiyo		
2012	BASARA	Sarasa	Lead	
2013	Hiroshima ni Genbaku wo Otosuhi	Bianka		
2014	BASARA 2	Sarasa	Lead	

== Bibliography ==
=== Photobooks ===
- 16 (Wani Books, 10 August 2013) ISBN 9784847045684

== See also ==
- Maki Horikita (same agency)
- Meisa Kuroki (same agency)
