= Evergreen Love =

- Poster

Japanese name
- Kanji: 植物図鑑 運命の恋、ひろいました
- Directed by: Kōichirō Miki
- Screenplay by: Chiho Watanabe
- Based on: Shokubutsu Zukan by Hiro Arikawa
- Produced by: Yoshitaka Ishizuka; Satoko Ishida; Ryuta Inoue
- Starring: Takanori Iwata; Mitsuki Takahata
- Cinematography: Yoko Itakura
- Edited by: Naoya Bando
- Music by: Takeshi Haketa
- Production companies: Horipro; LDH Japan; Gentosha; Kinoshita Group; Pony Canyon; Lawson Entertainment
- Distributed by: Shochiku
- Release date: June 4, 2016 (Japan)
- Running time: 112 minutes
- Country: Japan
- Language: Japanese
- Box office: US$20.1 million

Evergreen Love (Japanese: 植物図鑑 運命の恋、ひろいました, Hepburn: Shokubutsu Zukan: Unmei no Koi, Hiroimashita) is a 2016 Japanese romance film directed by Kōichirō Miki, starring Takanori Iwata and Mitsuki Takahata and based on the romance novel Shokubutsu Zukan by Hiro Arikawa. It was released in Japan on June 4, 2016.

== Plot ==
Sayaka (Mitsuki Takahata) works at an office. She's not very good at her job or with love. One night, she finds a man, Itsuki (Takanori Iwata), collapsed in front of her home. She takes him inside and they begin to live together. Itsuki teaches Sayaka about cooking wild herbs and collecting wild herbs, but he has a secret.

== Cast ==
- Takanori Iwata as Itsuki
- Mitsuki Takahata as Sayaka
- Hana Imai

== Reception ==
On its opening weekend in Japan, the film was number-one by admissions, with 264,270, and number-three by gross, with US$3.2 million.
