= Erina Nakayama (actress, born 1995) =

Japanese actress and model (born 1995)

- 中山 絵梨奈
- Born: June 1, 1995 (age 30); Chiba Prefecture, Japan
- Occupations: Actress, model
- Years active: 2008–2019
- Height: 167 cm (5 ft 6 in)

Erina Nakayama (中山 絵梨奈, Nakayama Erina; born June 1, 1995 in Chiba Prefecture, Japan) is a Japanese actress and model. She is best known for dual roles in the 2012-13 Kamen Rider Series Kamen Rider Wizard as Misa/Medusa and as Mayu Inamori/Kamen Rider Mage. She was represented by the agency Stardust Promotion.

== Filmography ==
=== TV series ===
Year	Title	Role	Network	Notes
2010	Hammer Session!	Shiori Kawahara	TBS	
2011	Kingyo Club	Saori Ueno	NHK	
2012	Kamen Rider Wizard	Misa/Medusa, Mayu Inamori/Kamen Rider Mage	TV Asahi	
2015	Minami kun no Koibito: My Little Lover	Sayori Nomura	Fuji TV	

=== Films ===
Year	Title	Role	Notes
2010	Aruyo no Dekigoto		
2012	Kamen Rider × Kamen Rider Wizard & Fourze: Movie War Ultimatum	Misa/Medusa	
2013	Kamen Rider Wizard in Magic Land	Misa/Medusa	
2013	Kamen Rider × Kamen Rider Gaim & Wizard: The Fateful Sengoku Movie Battle	Mayu Inamori/Kamen Rider Mage	
2014	Hokago Lost	Ogino	
2015	Red Cow	Rin Rin	
2016	Joshikō	Takako Minefuji	
