= Tsuyoshi Muro =

Japanese actor (born 1976)

- Born: January 23, 1976 (age 50); Kanagawa, Japan
- Occupation: Actor
- Years active: 1999–present

Tsuyoshi Muro (ムロツヨシ, Muro Tsuyoshi; born January 23, 1976) is a Japanese actor who appears on stage and screen. He debuted as an actor in 1999 and has appeared in the "Bayside Shakedown" series, NHK's Gochisosan, and Yūsha Yoshihiko.

== Filmography ==
=== Film ===
- Summer Time Machine Blues (2005)
- Tôbôsha: Kijima Jôichirô (2005)
- Hayashiya Sanpei monogatari (2006)
- Like A Dragon (2007)
- Shôrin shôjo (2008)
- Yatterman (2009)
- Ju-On: White Ghost (2009)
- Hentai Kamen (2013)
- Jossy's (2014)
- Himeanole (2016)
- Gold Medal Man (2016)
- Shippu Rondo (2016)
- Hentai Kamen: Abnormal Crisis (2016)
- Gin Tama (2017), Gengai Hiraga
- The Disastrous Life of Saiki K. (2017), Uryoku Chōno
- Destiny: The Tale of Kamakura (2017)
- Recall (2018), Shigemichi Komaki
- 50 First Kisses (2018)
- Gin Tama 2 (2018), Gengai Hiraga
- Dance with Me (2019), Yoshio Watanabe
- The Bucket List (2019)
- NiNoKuni (2019), old man (voice)
- Wotakoi: Love Is Hard for Otaku (2020)
- From Today, It's My Turn!! (2020)
- State of Emergency (2020)
- The Untold Tale of the Three Kingdoms (2020), Zhuge Liang
- My Daddy (2021), Kazuo Midō
- Riverside Mukolitta (2022), Shimada
- God Seeks in Return (2022), Tamogami
- Ripples (2023)
- Once Upon a Crime (2023), Paul the rat
- Don't Lose Your Head! (2024), Kira Kōzuke no suke / Kira Takaaki
- Saint Young Men: The Movie (2024)
- Under Ninja (2025), Ono
- New Interpretation of the End of Edo Period (2025), Sakamoto Ryōma
- Your Own Quiz (2026), Yasuhiko Sakata
- Sakamoto Days (2026), Pizza Nakajima
- Shin Gekijōban Keroro Gunsō: Fukkatsu Shite Sokkō Chikyū Metsubō no Kiki de Arimasu! (2026), Merebu (voice)
- Sins of Kujo: The Movie (2027), Kiyoshi Kyogoku

=== Television ===
- Taira no Kiyomori (2012), Taira no Tadanori
- Aoi Honō (2014), Hiroyuki Yamaga
- Montage (2016), Daisuke Mizuhara
- Kidnap Tour (2016)
- Naotora: The Lady Warlord (2017), Seto Hōkyū
- Hello, Detective Hedgehog (2017)
- Don't Forget Me (2018)
- From Today, It's My Turn!! (2018)
- Two Homelands (2019)
- Daddy is My Classmate (2020), Tarō "Gatarō" Obika
- The Sunflower Disappeared in the Rain (2022), Ken'ichi Nara
- What Will You Do, Ieyasu? (2023), Toyotomi Hideyoshi
- Sins of Kujo (2026), Kiyoshi Kyogoku

=== Dubbing roles ===
==== Animation ====
- Original voice: Alec Baldwin
  - The Boss Baby - Theodore Lindsey "Ted" Templeton Jr./The Boss Baby
  - The Boss Baby: Family Business - Theodore Lindsey "Ted" Templeton Jr./The Boss Baby

== Other ==
- "The Open Call" audition project (2026) as himself

== Awards and nominations ==
Year	Award	Category	Work(s)	Result	Ref.
2018	42nd Elan d'or Awards	Newcomer of the Year	Himself	Won	
2022	47th Hochi Film Awards	Best Supporting Actor	Riverside Mukolitta	Nominated	
