= List of Japanese films of 2017 =

A list of Japanese films that were first released in 2017.

== Highest-grossing films ==
The following is a list of the 10 highest-grossing Japanese films at the Japanese box office during 2017.

Rank	Title	Gross
1	Detective Conan: Crimson Love Letter	¥6.89 billion ($61.43 million)
2	Doraemon the Movie 2017: Great Adventure in the Antarctic Kachi Kochi	¥4.43 billion ($39.49 million)
3	Gintama	¥3.84 billion ($34.23 million)
4	Pokémon the Movie: I Choose You!	¥3.55 billion ($31.65 million)
5	Let Me Eat Your Pancreas	¥3.52 billion ($31.38 million)
6	Mary and the Witch's Flower	¥3.29 billion ($29.33 million)
7	Yo-kai Watch: Soratobu Kujira to Double no Sekai no Daibōken da Nyan!	¥3.26 billion ($29.06 million)
8	Sword Art Online The Movie: Ordinal Scale	¥2.52 billion ($22.47 million)
9	Mumon: The Land of Stealth	¥2.51 billion ($22.38 million)
10	Memoirs of a Murderer	¥2.41 billion ($21.49 million)

== Film releases ==
=== January – March ===
Opening		Title	Director	Cast	Ref(s)
J A N U A R Y	6	Kizumonogatari Part 3: Reiketsu	Tatsuya Oishi	Hiroshi Kamiya, Maaya Sakamoto, Yui Horie, Takahiro Sakurai, Miyu Irino, Masashi Ebara	
J A N U A R Y	7	Kabaneri of the Iron Fortress Pt.2	Tetsurō Araki	Tasuku Hatanaka, Sayaka Senbongi, Maaya Uchida, Toshiki Masuda, Yūki Kaji, Kanae Oki	
J A N U A R Y	14	Honnōji Hotel	Masayuki Suzuki	Haruka Ayase, Shinichi Tsutsumi, Gaku Hamada, Hiroyuki Hirayama, Hiromasa Taguchi, Masahiro Takashima	
J A N U A R Y	14	Chain Chronicle ~Light of Haecceitas~	Masashi Kudō	Akira Ishida, Ayane Sakura, Maaya Uchida, Toshiyuki Toyonaga, Asami Imai, Aya Uchida	
J A N U A R Y	21	Black Butler: Book of the Atlantic	Noriyuki Abe	Daisuke Ono, Maaya Sakamoto, Junichi Suwabe, Yukari Tamura, Jun Fukuyama, Kenn	
J A N U A R Y	27	KISEKI Sobito of That Day	Atsushi Kaneshige	Tori Matsuzaka, Masaki Suda, Ryusei Yokohama, Ryo Narita, Shiori Kutsuna, Yosuke Sugino, Yuna Taira	
J A N U A R Y	27	A Loving Husband	Kazuhiko Yukawa	Hiroshi Abe, Yūki Amami, Miho Kanno, Saki Aibu, Asuka Kudoh, Akari Hayami	
J A N U A R Y	27	Itazura na Kiss the Movie 2 ~Campus-Hen~	Minoru Mizoguchi	Kanta Satō, Reina Bisa, Nonoka Yamaguchi, Simon Ohkura, Atsuki Tomori, Hidehiko Ishizuka	
F E B R U A R Y	3	Saki	Yuichi Onuma	Minami Hamabe, Nana Asakawa, Aika Hirota, Mai Kikuchi, Rena Takeda	
F E B R U A R Y	3	Genocidal Organ	Shūkō Murase	Yuichi Nakamura, Satoshi Mikami, Kaito Ishikawa, Yūki Kaji	
F E B R U A R Y	3	Demons Covered by Scars	Santa Yamagishi	Rika Adachi, Manami Enosawa, Kayano Masuyama, Kayano Masuyama	
F E B R U A R Y	3	The 100th Love with You	Sho Tsukikawa	Miwa, Kentaro Sakaguchi, Ryo Ryusei, Erina Mano	
F E B R U A R Y	11	Survival Family	Shinobu Yaguchi	Fumiyo Kohinata, Eri Fukatsu, Yuki Izumisawa, Wakana Aoi	
F E B R U A R Y	11	Ao Oni The Animation	Toshirō Hamamura	Eri Kitamura, Ryōta Ōsaka, Takahiro Mizushima, Ayane Sakura	
F E B R U A R Y	17	Sword Art Online The Movie: Ordinal Scale	Tomohiko Itō	Haruka Tomatsu, Yoshitsugu Matsuoka, Ayana Taketatsu, Kanae Itō	
F E B R U A R Y	17	One Week Friends	Shōsuke Murakami	Kento Yamazaki, Haruna Kawaguchi, Takashi Matsuo, Shuhei Uesugi	
F E B R U A R Y	17	Gukoroku -Traces of Sin-	Kei Ishikawa	Satoshi Tsumabuki, Hikari Mitsushima, Keisuke Koide, Asami Usuda	
F E B R U A R Y	25	Kyō no Kira-kun	Taisuke Kawamura	Taishi Nakagawa, Marie Iitoyo, Shono Hayama, Yuna Taira	
F E B R U A R Y	25	Close-Knit	Naoko Ogigami	Kenta Kiritani, Toma Ikuta, Rinka Kakihara, Rie Mimura	
M A R C H	3	Haruta & Chika	Masahide Ichii	Shori Sato, Kanna Hashimoto, Keisuke Koide, Yuri Tsunematsu	
M A R C H	3	PriPara the Movie: Everyone Shine! Kirarin Star Live	Nobutaka Yoda	Coco Hayashi, Miyu Kubota, Nanami Atsugi, Himika Akaneya	
M A R C H	3	Doraemon the Movie 2017: Great Adventure in the Antarctic Kachi Kochi	Atsushi Takahashi	Wasabi Mizuta, Megumi Ohara, Yumi Kakazu, Subaru Kimura, Tomokazu Seki	
M A R C H	11	Let's Go, Jets!	Hayato Kawai	Suzu Hirose, Ayami Nakajo, Hirona Yamazaki, Miu Tomita, Sakurako Ohara, Mackenyu	
M A R C H	17	Ancien and the Magic Tablet (a.k.a. Napping Princess)	Kenji Kamiyama	Mitsuki Takahata, Shinnosuke Mitsushima, Arata Furuta, Yōsuke Eguchi	
M A R C H	17	Pretty Cure Dream Stars!	Hiroshi Miyamoto	Haruka Fukuhara, Karen Miyama, Tomo Muranaka, Saki Fujita	
M A R C H	17	Yuki Yuna wa Yūsha-bu Shozoku and Yuki Yuna: Washio Sumi Chapter Series	Seiji Kishi	Ryunosuke Kamiki, Kuranosuke Sasaki, Hideaki Itō, Ryo Kase	
M A R C H	17	March Comes in Like a Lion: Part 1	Keishi Ōtomo	Rie Hosaka, Rina Honnizumi, Yui Ogura, Konomi Tada	
M A R C H	18	Kuroko's Basketball The Movie: Last Game	Shunsuke Tada	Kensho Ono, Yūki Ono, Hiroshi Kamiya, Junichi Suwabe, Daisuke Ono, Ryōhei Kimura, Kenichi Suzumura, Hikaru Midorikawa, Tetsu Inada	
M A R C H	24	Daytime Shooting Star	Takehiko Shinjō	Mei Nagano, Shohei Miura, Alan Shirahama, Maika Yamamoto	
M A R C H	24	P and JK	Ryūichi Hiroki	Kazuya Kamenashi, Tao Tsuchiya, Mahiro Takasugi, Tina Tamashiro	
M A R C H	24	Sakurada Reset: Part 1	Yoshihiro Fukagawa	Shūhei Nomura, Yuina Kuroshima, Yuna Taira, Kentarō	

=== April - June ===
Opening		Title	Director	Cast	Ref(s)
A P R I L	1	Ankoku Joshi	Saiji Yakumo	Fumika Shimizu, Marie Iitoyo, Nana Seino, Tina Tamashiro	
A P R I L	7	The Night Is Short, Walk On Girl	Masaaki Yuasa	Gen Hoshino, Kana Hanazawa, Hiroshi Kamiya, Ryuji Akiyama	
A P R I L	7	Neko Atsume no Ie	Masatoshi Kurakata	Atsushi Itō, Shiori Kutsuna, Masahiro Toda, Kayoko Ohkubo	
A P R I L	14	Detective Conan: The Crimson Love Letter	Kobun Shizuno	Minami Takayama, Wakana Yamazaki, Rikiya Koyama, Tōru Furuya	
A P R I L	14	Crayon Shin-chan: Invasion!! Alien Shiriri	Masakazu Hashimoto	Akiko Yajima, Miki Narahashi, Toshiyuki Morikawa, Satomi Kōrogi, Mari Mashiba, Tamao Hayashi	
A P R I L	14	ReLIFE	Takeshi Furusawa	Taishi Nakagawa, Yuna Taira, Mahiro Takasugi, Elaiza Ikeda	
A P R I L	21	March Comes in Like a Lion: Part 2	Keishi Ōtomo	Ryunosuke Kamiki, Kuranosuke Sasaki, Hideaki Itō, Ryo Kase	
A P R I L	28	Blade of the Immortal	Takashi Miike	Takuya Kimura, Hana Sugisaki, Sota Fukushi, Hayato Ichihara	
A P R I L	28	Teiichi: Battle of Supreme High	Akira Nagai	Masaki Suda, Shūhei Nomura, Ryoma Takeuchi, Shotaro Mamiya, Jun Shison, Yudai Chiba, Mei Nagano	
M A Y	3	LAST COP The Movie	Ryuichi Inomata	Toshiaki Karasawa, Masataka Kubota, Ryo Yoshizawa, Nozomi Sasaki, Naohito Fujiki	
M A Y	5	Fairy Tail Movie 2: Dragon Cry	Tatsuma Minamikawa	Tetsuya Kakihara, Aya Hirano, Rie Kugimiya, Yuichi Nakamura	
M A Y	5	Reminiscence	Yasuo Furuhata	Junichi Okada, Shun Oguri, Tasuku Emoto, Masami Nagasawa	
M A Y	12	Hurricane Polymar	Koichi Sakamoto	Junpei Mizobata, Yuki Yamada, Mikie Hara, Yurina Yanagi	
M A Y	12	Sakurada Reset: Part 2	Yoshihiro Fukagawa	Shūhei Nomura, Yuina Kuroshima, Yuna Taira, Kentarō	
M A Y	12	Lu Over the Wall	Masaaki Yuasa	Kanon Tani, Shōta Shimoda, Akira Emoto, Sōma Saitō	
M A Y	12	Peach Girl	Koji Shintoku	Mizuki Yamamoto, Kei Inoo, Mackenyu, Mei Nagano	
M A Y	12	Blame!	Hiroyuki Seshita	Kana Hanazawa, Takahiro Sakurai, Sora Amamiya, Mamoru Miyano	
M A Y	26	Resident Evil: Vendetta	Takanori Tsujimoto	Kevin Dorman, Matthew Mercer, Erin Cahill, Kari Wahlgren	
M A Y	26	What a Wonderful Family 2!	Yoji Yamada	Isao Hashizume, Kazuko Yoshiyuki, Masahiko Nishimura, Yui Natsukawa	
M A Y	26	A Beautiful Star	Daihachi Yoshida	Lily Franky, Kazuya Kamenashi, Ai Hashimoto, Tomoko Nakajima	
M A Y	27	Radiance	Naomi Kawase	Masatoshi Nagase, Ayame Misaki, Misuzu Kanno, Mantaro Koichi	
J U N E	1	Flower and Sword	Tetsuo Shinohara	Mansai Nomura, Ichikawa En'nosuke IV, Kōichi Satō, Kiichi Nakai	
J U N E	8	Confession of Murder (a.k.a. Memoirs of a Murderer)	Yu Irie	Tatsuya Fujiwara, Hideaki Itō, Kaho, Shuhei Nomura	
J U N E	15	Kodomo Tsukai	Takashi Shimizu	Hideaki Takizawa, Daiki Arioka, Mugi Kadowaki, Hiroyuki Onoue	
J U N E	17	The Irregular at Magic High School: The Movie – The Girl Who Summons the Stars	Risako Yoshida	Yuichi Nakamura, Saori Hayami, Yumi Uchiyama, Takuma Terashima	
J U N E	30	My Brother Loves Me Too Much	Hayato Kawai	Tao Tsuchiya, Ryota Katayose, Yudai Chiba, Takuya Kusakawa	
J U N E	30	Mumon: The Land of Stealth	Yoshihiro Nakamura	Satoshi Ohno, Satomi Ishihara, Ryohei Suzuki, Yūsuke Iseya	

=== July - September ===
Opening		Title	Director	Cast	Ref(s)
J U L Y	7	Mary and the Witch's Flower	Hiromasa Yonebayashi	Hana Sugisaki, Ryunosuke Kamiki, Yūki Amami, Fumiyo Kohinata	
J U L Y	14	No Game, No Life Zero	Hiroshi Nishikiori, Atsuko Ishizuka	Yoshitsugu Matsuoka, Ai Kayano, Yōko Hikasa, Yukari Tamura	
J U L Y	14	Gintama	Yūichi Fukuda	Shun Oguri, Masaki Suda, Kanna Hashimoto, Yūya Yagira, Ryo Yoshizawa, Masami Nagasawa, Masaki Okada	
J U L Y	14	Pokémon the Movie 20: I Choose You!	Tetsuo Yajima	Rica Matsumoto, Ikue Ōtani, Megumi Hayashibara, Shinichiro Miki	
J U L Y	21	Magical Girl Lyrical Nanoha Reflection	Takayuki Hamana	Yukari Tamura, Nana Mizuki, Kana Ueda, Haruka Tomatsu	
J U L Y	21	The Anthem of the Heart	Tatsuyuki Nagai, Naoto Kumzawa	Kyoko Yoshine, Kento Nakajima, Anna Ishii, Ichiro Kan	
J U L Y	28	Let Me Eat Your Pancreas	Sho Tsukikawa	Minami Hamabe, Takumi Kitamura, Shun Oguri, Keiko Kitagawa	
J U L Y	28	Tokyo Ghoul	Kentarō Hagiwara	Masataka Kubota, Fumika Shimizu, Nobuyuki Suzuki, Hiyori Sakurada	
A U G U S T	4	JoJo's Bizarre Adventure: Diamond Is Unbreakable Chapter I	Takashi Miike	Kento Yamazaki, Ryunosuke Kamiki, Mackenyu, Nana Komatsu, Masaki Okada	
A U G U S T	18	The Ancient Magus’ Bride: Those Awaiting a Star	Norihiro Naganuma	Atsumi Tanezaki, Ryota Takeuchi, Kōki Uchiyama, Yūko Kaida	
A U G U S T	18	Fireworks	Akiyuki Shinbo, Nobuyuki Takeuchi	Suzu Hirose, Masaki Suda, Mamoru Miyano, Takako Matsu	
A U G U S T	25	Fate/kaleid liner Prisma Illya: Oath Under Snow	Shin Ōnuma	Kaori Nazuka, Noriaki Sugiyama, Mai Kadowaki, Noriko Shitaya	
A U G U S T	25	Kimi no Koe o Todoketai	Naoyuki Itō	Mina Katahira, Yuki Tanaka, Iwabuchi Momoka, Kobe Mitsuaki	
A U G U S T	26	Sekigahara	Masato Harada	Junichi Okada, Kōji Yakusho, Kasumi Arimura, Takehiro Hira	
A U G U S T	26	Asura Girl: Blood-C Another Story	Shutaro Oku	Kaede Aono, Ryūnosuke Matsumura, Arata Furuta, Kanon Miyahara, Eiji Takigawa	
S E P T E M B E R	8	The Third Murder	Hirokazu Kore-eda	Masaharu Fukuyama, Kōji Yakusho, Suzu Hirose, Yuki Saito	
S E P T E M B E R	Before We Vanish	Kiyoshi Kurosawa	Masami Nagasawa, Ryuhei Matsuda, Hiroki Hasegawa, Mahiro Takasugi		
S E P T E M B E R	15	Haikyū Third Season Movie	Susumu Mitsunaka	Ayumu Murase, Kaito Ishikawa, Satoshi Hino, Miyu Irino	
S E P T E M B E R	15	Eureka Seven: Hi-Evolution	Hisatoshi Shimizu, Tomoki Kyoda	Yuko Sanpei, Keiji Fujiwara, Kaori Nazuka, Kōji Tsujitani	
S E P T E M B E R	15	Tornado Girl	Hitoshi Ōne	Satoshi Tsumabuki, Kiko Mizuhara, Hirofumi Arai, Sakura Ando	
S E P T E M B E R	22	Asahinagu	Tsutomu Hanabusa	Nanase Nishino, Mai Shiraishi, Reika Sakurai, Sayuri Matsumura	
S E P T E M B E R	22	Miracles of the Namiya General Store	Ryūichi Hiroki	Ryosuke Yamada, Nijiro Murakami, Kanichiro, Riko Narumi	
S E P T E M B E R	22	Yurigokoro	Naoto Kumazawa	Yuriko Yoshitaka, Tori Matsuzaka, Kenichi Matsuyama, Nana Seino	
S E P T E M B E R	29	Ajin	Katsuyuki Motohiro	Takeru Satoh, Gō Ayano, Tetsuji Tamayama, Yu Shirota, Rina Kawaei	
S E P T E M B E R	30	Sound! Euphonium: The Movie – May the Melody Reach You!	Taichi Ogawa	Tomoyo Kurosawa, Ayaka Asai, Moe Toyota, Chika Anzai	

=== October - December ===
Opening		Title	Director	Cast	Ref(s)
O C T O B E R	13	Fate/stay night: Heaven's Feel I. presage flower	Tomonori Sudō	Noriaki Sugiyama, Noriko Shitaya, Kana Ueda, Yuu Asakawa, Mai Kadowaki	
O C T O B E R	13	Yowamushi Pedal: Re:GENERATION!	Osamu Nabeshima	Nobunaga Shimazaki, Tatsuhisa Suzuki, Tsubasa Yonaga, Daisuke Kishio	
O C T O B E R	Love and Lies	Takeshi Furusawa	Aoi Morikawa, Kanta Sato, Takumi Kitamura, Nana Asakawa		
O C T O B E R	20	The Disastrous Life of Saiki K.	Yūichi Fukuda	Kento Yamazaki, Kanna Hashimoto, Ryo Yoshizawa, Hirofumi Arai, Hideyuki Kasahara, Kento Kaku	
O C T O B E R	20	Mixed Doubles!	Junichi Ishikawa	Yui Aragaki, Eita Nagayama, Ryōko Hirosue, Hayato Sano	
O C T O B E R	21	Code Geass Lelouch of the Resurrection the Movie: Awakening Path	Gorō Taniguchi	Jun Fukuyama, Takahiro Sakurai, Yukana, Ami Koshimizu	
O C T O B E R	27	Birds Without Names	Kazuya Shiraishi	Yū Aoi, Sadao Abe, Yutaka Takenouchi, Tori Matsuzaka	
O C T O B E R	27	My Teacher	Takahiro Miki	Toma Ikuta, Suzu Hirose, Ryo Ryusei, Aoi Morikawa	
O C T O B E R	N O V E M B E R	3	Hyouka: Forbidden Secrets	Mari Asato	Kento Yamazaki, Alice Hirose, Kanata Hongō, Amane Okayama, Fujiko Kojima
O C T O B E R	N O V E M B E R	3	The Last Recipe	Yōjirō Takita	Kazunari Ninomiya, Hidetoshi Nishijima, Gō Ayano, Aoi Miyazaki
10	N O V E M B E R	Gekijōban Haikara-san ga Tōru Zenpen ~Benio, Hana no 17-sai~	Kazuhiro Furuhashi	Saori Hayami, Kazuya Nakai, Mamoru Miyano, Kazuya Nakai	
10	N O V E M B E R	Make a Bow and Kiss	Takeshi Furusawa	Elaiza Ikeda, Masaki Nakao, Takashi Matsuo, Katsuhiro Suzuki	
10	N O V E M B E R	Foreboding	Kiyoshi Kurosawa	Kaho, Shōta Sometani, Masahiro Higashide, Eriko Nakamura	
16	N O V E M B E R	Godzilla: Planet of the Monsters	Hiroyuki Seshita, Kōbun Shizuno	Mamoru Miyano, Takahiro Sakurai, Kana Hanazawa, Yūki Kaji	
24	N O V E M B E R	Hibana	Itsuji Itao	Masaki Suda, Kenta Kiritani, Fumino Kimura, Shūshi Kawatani	
24	N O V E M B E R	Anonymous Noise	Koichiro Miki	Ayami Nakajo, Jun Shison, Yuta Koseki, Yosuke Sugino, Hayato Isomura, Miyuki Sawashiro	
25	N O V E M B E R	Itazura na Kiss the Movie 3 ~Proposal-Hen~	Minoru Mizoguchi	Kanta Satō, Reina Bisa, Nonoka Yamaguchi, Simon Ohkura	
D E C E M B E R	1	Fullmetal Alchemist	Fumihiko Sori	Ryosuke Yamada, Atomu Mizuishi, Tsubasa Honda, Dean Fujioka	
D E C E M B E R	1	Laughing Under the Clouds Gaiden	Tetsuya Wakano	Yuichi Nakamura, Yūki Kaji, Kōsuke Toriumi, Tsubasa Yonaga	
D E C E M B E R	1	Phone Call to the Bar 3.0	Teruyuki Yoshida	Yo Oizumi, Ryuhei Matsuda, Keiko Kitagawa, Atsuko Maeda	
D E C E M B E R	8	Destiny: The Tale of Kamakura	Takashi Yamazaki	Masato Sakai, Mitsuki Takahata, Shinichi Tsutsumi, Sakura Ando	
D E C E M B E R	9	Girls und Panzer das Finale: Part 1	Tsutomu Mizushima	Mai Fuchigami, Ai Kayano, Mami Ozaki, Ikumi Nakagami	
D E C E M B E R	15	The 8-Year Engagement	Takahisa Zeze	Takeru Satoh, Tao Tsuchiya, Kazuki Kitamura, Kenta Hamano	
D E C E M B E R	15	Yo-kai Watch Shadowside: Oni-ō no Fukkatsu	Shinji Ushiro	Mone Kamishiraishi, Yudai Chiba, Mutsumi Tamura, Ako Mayama	
D E C E M B E R	22	Teen Bride	Tsutomu Hanabusa, Hayato Kawai	Kento Nakajima, Yuna Taira, Yuri Chinen, Maika Yamamoto	
D E C E M B E R	22	Revenge Girl	Koichiro Miki	Mirei Kiritani, Nobuyuki Suzuki, Sho Kiyohara, Fumika Baba	

== See also ==
- 2017 in Japan
- 2017 in Japanese television
- List of 2017 box office number-one films in Japan
