= TV Setouchi =

Television station in Okayama Prefecture, Japan

Coordinates: 34°39′29.1″N 133°55′12.7″E

JOPH-DTV
- Logo used since 2004

- Headquarters at the Sanyo Shimbun building at Yanagimachi, Kita-ku, Okayama
- Okayama and Kagawa; Japan
- City: Okayama
- Channels: Digital: 18 (UHF); Virtual: 7
- Branding: TV Setouchi; TSC

Programming
- Language: Japanese
- Affiliations: TX Network

Ownership
- Owner: TV Setouchi Broadcasting Co., Ltd.

History
- Founded: October 9, 1984
- First air date: October 1, 1985
- Former call signs: JOPH-TV (1985–2011)
- Former channel numbers: Analog: 23 (UHF, 1985–2011)

Technical information
- Licensing authority: MIC

Links
- Website: https://www.webtsc.co.jp/

TV Setouchi Broadcasting Co., Ltd. (テレビせとうち株式会社, Terebi Setouchi Kabushikigaisha) (TSC), callsign JOPH-DTV (channel 7) is a Japanese television station based in Okayama, serving as the affiliate of the TX Network for the Okayama and Kagawa prefectures.

== History ==
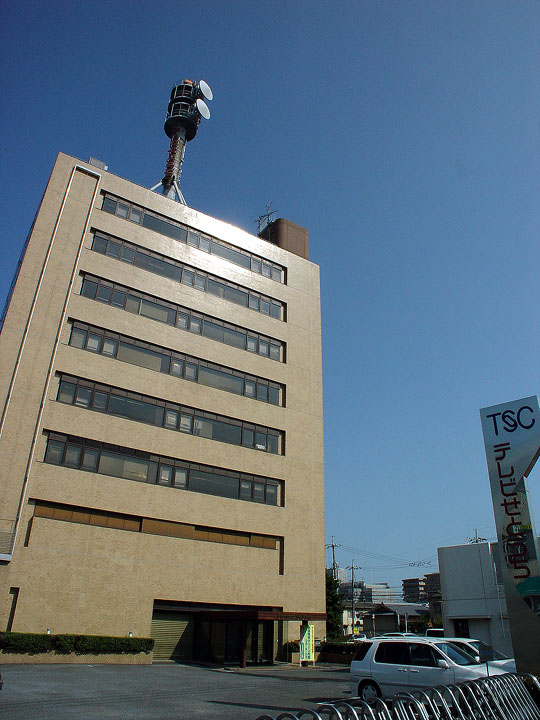
Former headquarters in Noda, Okayama, until 2006.

In 1978, when prefectures with the economic size of Okayama (Fukushima, Niigata, Nagano, Kumamoto and Kagoshima) were gearing up for their third commercial stations, Chutetsu Bus president Shozo Fujita and others campaigned for the establishment of Eastern Chugoku Television Broadcasting (東中国テレビ放送). At the time, there were only two commercial stations in Okayama, JNN affiliate RSK Sanyo Broadcasting and FNN/FNS affiliate Okayama Broadcasting. The plan stalled due to the 1981 merger of the Okayama and Kagawa television markets, which enabled the area to have four commercial stations instead of two stations in each prefecture; facing this background, the Ministry of Posts and Telecommunications granted a new UHF frequency, channel 23. 352 companies were attracted by the bid. After two years of adjustments, the companies merged their bids and TV Setouchi was formed, obtaining its license on July 24, 1984. On October 3, 1984, the company held its founding ceremony; at the time of founding, its capital was estimated to be at 800 million yen. Shozo Fujita was its president and Chutetsu Bus was its largest shareholder. On November 20, 1984, it started building its headquarters, an eight-floor facility with 2,818 square meters. The work was completed on July 29, 1985.

On September 25, 1985, test broadcasts started; on October 1, at 6:18am, TV Setouchi started broadcasting, becoming the 104th private television station in Japan. At 7am on launch day, it aired a one-hour special launch program. After opening an office in Takamatsu, within its coverage area, TSC also opened offices in Osaka and Tokyo. Its advertising sales in 1989 surpassed the 2 billion yen mark, with a total of 2.51 billion yen. The station only made profits in fiscal 1991, achieving 80 million yen.

In 1992, to improve its financial situation, it increased its capital to 1.6 billion yen. However, in 1995, it had accumulated losses of 1.934 billion yen. In 1997, its advertising rates were adjusted to those practiced by the four other stations in the region (RNC, KSB, RSK, OHK). In 1998, its daily average share was of 4.2%, reaching 9.4% during primetime (7-10 pm) and 8.5% during the wider evening slot (8.5%). However, the station was hit by the effects of the Japanese financial crisis, resulting in reduced ad sales. The operational conditions of its parent company Chutetsu Group began to deteriorate and could not continue under these conditions. On December 20, 1999, Chutetsu Bus sold its shares to the Sanyo Shimbun printing company, which continues to this day. When they took over the station's management, they began to implement measures to strengthen its advertising revenue. In fiscal 2000, the station initiated the 5-4-2 plan: sales per capita worth 50 million yen, total sales of 4 billion yen and an operating profit margin of 20%. Simultaneously, it became the last station in the TXN network to launch its official website, WebTSC. During fiscal 2003, TV Setouchi achieved its goal to pay all of its accumulated debts one year ahead of schedule, achieving a debtless operation for the first time. In 2004, its operating margin reached 23%, achieving second place among the Japanese commercial stations.

In order to update its corporate image, the station unveiled a new logo on April 1, 2004, which included its mascot Nana-chan (ななちゃん). Both the new logo and Nana-chan were created by TSC employee Yoshie Kitai. The station made a series of events for its twentieth anniversary in 2005, which included special programming such as Warm Welcome! Family Dining Room. On December 1, 2006, TSC started digital broadcasts on virtual channel 7, while moving earlier in the year to the Sanyo Shimbun building. In 2017, Masato Doi succeeded Hideo Kawabata as president of TV Setouchi.

On November 20, 2023, its digital master control room was upgraded for the first time since 2006. The new equipment uses an IP-based system devised by NEC in 2021 which accommodates the possibility of using the internet and delivering 4K broadcasts. An operation was held alongside Television Hokkaido from March 11 to March 22, 2024, in which both stations tested remote playout systems for TXN, producing signals for Tokyo.
