= The 8-Year Engagement =

- Theatrical release poster
- Directed by: Takahisa Zeze
- Written by: Yoshikazu Okada
- Produced by: Shinya Watanabe; Daisuke Fukushima; Akiko Ikuno
- Starring: Takeru Satoh; Tao Tsuchiya
- Cinematography: Koichi Saito
- Edited by: Ryo Hayano
- Music by: Takatsugu Muramatsu
- Production companies: TBS Holdings; Kinoshita Group; Amuse Inc.; CBC; MBS; KDDI; Hokkaido Broadcasting; RKB Mainichi Broadcasting; GyaO; RSK Sanyo Broadcasting; Sanyo Shimbun
- Distributed by: Shochiku
- Release date: 16 December 2017 (Japan)
- Running time: 119 minutes
- Country: Japan
- Language: Japanese
- Box office: ¥2.5 billion

The 8-Year Engagement (Japanese: 8年越しの花嫁 奇跡の実話, Hepburn: 8-nengoshi no Hanayome: Kiseki no Jitsuwa) is a 2017 Japanese drama film directed by Takahisa Zeze. It is based on an autobiographical book by Hisashi Nishozawa and Mai Nakahara.

== Plot ==
Living in Okayama, Hisashi meets Mai for the first time at a restaurant party, but she lets him know she doesn't like his sullen attitude. He apologizes, saying he had been nauseous all day, and Mai, feeling guilty, cheerfully sees him off. The two begin dating and after a few months, the shy Hisashi finally asks for her hand in marriage. She says yes and they go so far as to reserve a place for the ceremony when Mai starts suffering lapses of memory. One day she suddenly experiences an extreme seizure accompanied by hysteria.

At the hospital, she suffers a heart attack, but even after the doctors save her, she remains in a coma. She is diagnosed with anti-NMDA receptor encephalitis, a form of brain inflammation. Hisashi visits the hospital every day and helps take care of her with her parents, Hatsumi and Kōji. They begin to worry about Hisashi, however, and tell him one day not to come anymore, suggesting he get on with his life. He refuses, remembering his promise of marriage to Mai. Hatsumi is still glad to hear of his resolve, thinking of him now as a member of the family. More than a year later, Mai finally wakes from the coma, but in the words of the doctor, needs to start all over again, re-learning how to speak and move her body.

After several years of rehabilitation, Mai remains in a wheelchair, but is mostly back to her old cheerful self. But it becomes clear she remembers nothing of Hisashi from before the coma. She desperately tries to remember, even going to places they once visited, but her efforts are only a burden on her still frail body. Hisashi decides it is best to not see Mai anymore and moves to Shodo Island.

One day, Mai happens upon the ceremony hall where they had reserved a date for their marriage. The attendant recognizes her and tells her that Hisashi had still maintained the reservation, postponing it each year, but keeping the same date: March 17, the day they first met. Realizing that date was the password she had forgotten for her phone, she opens it to see that Hisashi had been sending her videos for years to encourage her even as she was in a coma. Mai rushes to Shodo to meet Hisashi. She says that even if she cannot remember, she still wants to marry him. The story ends with their marriage.

== Cast ==
- Takeru Satoh as Hisashi
- Tao Tsuchiya as Mai
- Hiroko Yakushimaru as Mai's mother
- Tetta Sugimoto as Mai's father
- Kazuki Kitamura as Shibata
- Kenta Hamano as Murota
- Yuri Nakamura as Shimao
- Keisuke Horibe as Dr. Wada
- Kanji Furutachi as President of Kiyomen Factory
- Ramu Matsumoto as Miho

== Reception ==
The film was a success at the Japanese box office, selling over two million tickets and earning ¥2.5 billion at the box office by 28 January 2018.

== Awards ==
Award ceremony	Category	Nominee	Result
41st Japan Academy Prize	Best Actor	Takeru Satoh	Nominated
41st Japan Academy Prize	Best Actress	Tao Tsuchiya	Nominated
41st Japan Academy Prize	Best Supporting Actress	Hiroko Yakushimaru	Nominated
41st Japan Academy Prize	Best Music	Takatsugu Muramatsu	Nominated
