= List of 2017 box office number-one films in Japan =

The following is a list of 2017 box office number-one films in Japan. When the number-one film in gross is not the same as the number-one film in admissions, both are listed.

#	Date	Film	Gross	Notes
1	January 8, 2017	Resident Evil: The Final Chapter	US$2.5 million	In gross
1	January 8, 2017	Yo-kai Watch: Soratobu Kujira to Double no Sekai no Daibōken da Nyan!	US$1.95 million	In attendance
2	January 15, 2017	Honnōji Hotel	US$1.8 million	
3	January 22, 2017	Your Name	US$1.5 million	
4	January 29, 2017	Doctor Strange	US$3.4 million	
5	February 5, 2017	Miss Peregrine's Home for Peculiar Children	US$2.06 million	
6	February 12, 2017	Partners: The Movie IV	US$3.5 million	
7	February 19, 2017	Sword Art Online The Movie: Ordinal Scale	US$3.76 million	
8	February 26, 2017	La La Land	US$3.7 million	
9	March 5, 2017	Doraemon the Movie 2017: Great Adventure in the Antarctic Kachi Kochi	US$6.1 million	
10	March 12, 2017	Moana	US$6.2 million	
11	March 19, 2017	Sing	US$5.8 million	
12	March 26, 2017	Sing	US$4.1 million	
13	April 2, 2017	Sing	US$4.2 million	
14	April 9, 2017	Sing	US$2.8 million	
15	April 16, 2017	Detective Conan: Crimson Love Letter	US$14.0 million	
16	April 23, 2017	Beauty and the Beast	US$12.5 million	
17	April 30, 2017	Beauty and the Beast	US$9.98 million	
18	May 7, 2017	Beauty and the Beast	US$7.9 million	
19	May 14, 2017	Beauty and the Beast	US$5.06 million	
20	May 21, 2017	Beauty and the Beast	US$3.9 million	
21	May 28, 2017	Beauty and the Beast	US$3.15 million	
22	June 4, 2017	Beauty and the Beast	US$2.77 million	
23	June 11, 2017	Confession of Murder	US$2.92 million	
24	June 18, 2017	Confession of Murder	US$2.35 million	
25	June 25, 2017	Confession of Murder	US$2.1 million	
26	July 2, 2017	Pirates of the Caribbean: Dead Men Tell No Tales	US$9.25 million	
27	July 9, 2017	Pirates of the Caribbean: Dead Men Tell No Tales	US$6.5 million	
28	July 16, 2017	Gintama	US$6.3 million	In gross
28	July 16, 2017	Pokémon the Movie 20: I Choose You!	US$4.6 million	In attendance
29	July 23, 2017	Despicable Me 3	US$5.4 million	
30	July 30, 2017	Despicable Me 3	US$4.8 million	
31	August 6, 2017	Despicable Me 3	US$3.39 million	
32	August 13, 2017	Spider-Man: Homecoming	US$4.01 million	In gross
32	August 13, 2017	Despicable Me 3	US$3.7 million	In attendance
33	August 20, 2017	High&Low The Movie 2 / End of Sky	US$3.2 million	
34	August 27, 2017	Sekigahara	US$3.6 million	
35	September 3, 2017	Sekigahara	US$2.5 million	
36	September 10, 2017	Dunkirk	US$2.98 million	
37	September 17, 2017	Dunkirk	US$1.82 million	In gross
37	September 17, 2017	Alien: Covenant	US$1.72 million	In attendance
38	September 24, 2017	Miracles of the Namiya General Store	US$1.72 million	
39	October 1, 2017	Ajin: Demi-Human	US$2.41 million	
40	October 8, 2017	Outrage Coda	US$3.1 million	
41	October 15, 2017	Fate/stay night: Heaven's Feel I. presage flower	US$3.6 million	
42	October 22, 2017	Mixed Doubles	US$2.1 million	
43	October 29, 2017	Blade Runner 2049	US$1.99 million	In gross
43	October 29, 2017	Kirakira PreCure a la Mode the Movie: Crisply! The Memory of Mille-feuille!	US$1.7 million	In attendance
44	November 5, 2017	Thor: Ragnarok	US$2.0 million	
45	November 12, 2017	High&Low The Movie 3 / Final Mission	US$2.7 million	
46	November 19, 2017	It	US$1.73 million	
47	November 26, 2017	Justice League	US$1.82 million	
48	December 3, 2017	Fullmetal Alchemist	US$3.3 million	
49	December 10, 2017	Kamen Rider Heisei Generations Final: Build & Ex-Aid with Legend Rider	US$3.2 million	
50	December 17, 2017	Star Wars: The Last Jedi	US$9.9 million	
51	December 24, 2017	Star Wars: The Last Jedi	US$6.14 million	
52	December 31, 2017	Star Wars: The Last Jedi	US$4.2 million	

== Highest-grossing films ==
International film Japanese film

Highest-grossing films of 2017
Rank	Title	Gross
1	Beauty and the Beast	¥12.40 billion ($110.55 million)
2	Fantastic Beasts and Where to Find Them	¥7.34 billion ($65.44 million)
3	Despicable Me 3	¥7.31 billion ($65.17 million)
4	Case Closed: The Crimson Love Letter	¥6.89 billion ($61.43 million)
5	Pirates of the Caribbean: Dead Men Tell No Tales	¥6.71 billion ($59.82 million)
6	Moana	¥5.16 billion ($46 million)
7	Sing	¥5.11 billion ($45.56 million)
8	Rogue One	¥4.63 billion ($41.28 million)
9	Doraemon the Movie 2017: Great Adventure in the Antarctic Kachi Kochi	¥4.43 billion ($39.49 million)
10	La La Land	¥4.42 billion ($39.41 million)

== See also ==
- List of Japanese films of 2017
