= Tomodachiga Yatteru Cafe =

Café where actors play friends of customers

- 友達がやってるカフェ
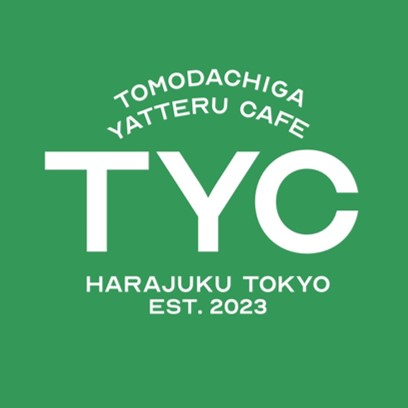
- Location: Shibuya, Tokyo, Japan
- Coordinates: 35°40′3.0″N 139°42′20.5″E
- Address: Jingūmae6chome 6-2 Harajuku Berupia 3rd floor
- Opened: April 22, 2023; 3 years ago
- Closed: September 30, 2024; 2 years ago
- Manager: Kakeru Inc.
- Public transit: Meiji-jingumae Station; Harajuku Station; Omote-sandō Station
- Website: www.instagram.com/tyc_harajuku/

Tomodachiga Yatteru Café (Japanese: 友達がやってるカフェ; lit. 'Cafe Run by My Friend', TYC) was a concept café located in Jingūmae, Shibuya, Tokyo, which operated from 2023 to 2024. The café hired staff who were experienced actors or models to act as if they were old friends of the customers and speak with them casually. The TYC concept went viral on social media, and was particularly popular with Generation Z. The café was ranked in several top trend lists for 2023.

TYC operated as Tomodachiga Yatteru Bar (友達がやってるバー; lit. 'bar run by my friend', TYB), serving alcoholic beverages in the evening. Beverage company Suntory also launched a line of alcoholic drinks it developed with input from TYC.

== Etymology ==
The name of the restaurant, "cafe run by my friends", originated from a conversation between Suguru Myoen and one of his employees. When Myoen was on a company trip about six months prior to the opening of the store and an employee asked, "Can we go to the café that my friend runs?", Myoen felt it was "special and enviable", and Myoen thought it would be fun if everyone could say "Why don't we go to the café that my friend runs?".

== History ==
TYC was planned as an experimental restaurant by Suguru Myoen, the representative director of the advertising and planning production company Kakeru.

=== Before establishment ===
In 2014, Myoen began working as a commercial planner and copywriter at the advertising agency Dentsu. Myoen left Dentsu in 2020 and founded Kakeru, an advertising and planning production company. He presided over the coffee speakeasy "JANAI COFFEE" ("not coffee"), a bar that pretended to be a café, and the "Yadana" (an expression of dislike) exhibition, which gathered together things that he thought were "yadana". Myoen started his own business with the intention of doing advertising work, but he also started a restaurant business and doing special exhibitions because he wanted to create the kind of things he liked.

=== Establishment ===
According to Myoen, TYC was an experiment to see what the experience would be like if the relationships between customers and waitstaff were established as "friends" from the beginning, so that the waitstaff and customers would treat each other as equals. He wanted to create a magical experience where the more the staff treats the customers in a messy way, the happier they will be. Myoen questioned Japan's "customer supremacy" and said that the restaurant industry, being influenced by the ratings of online reviews, results in a customer service culture that requires perfect service to customers. Myoen describes the positive reactions and atmosphere after the opening of the café as a pleasant discovery, and says, "I have no desire to destroy or eliminate the culture in which the customer is God. I just hope this can be taken as one suggestion that this kind of customer service could also be acceptable."

=== Staff recruitment ===
On February 20, 2023, a job opening was announced for experienced professionals in the entertainment industry, such as actors, entertainers, models, and social media creators. Due to the unexpectedly large response to the pre-opening in April, additional positions were advertised for experienced baristas, bartenders, etc., in addition to the above requirements. Over 300 people applied to become waitstaff.

=== Cafe ===
The Harajuku district was chosen because it is "a town where new things are born" and also because it is close to the office of Kakeru and "a town full of cheerful people and pleasant atmosphere". The store was chosen within about two weeks of conception. To make the café accessible to everyone, regardless of age or gender, the interior was designed with a base of deep green and white, with flowers decorating the counters and tables. There were no fancy decorations or unusual pieces inside or outside the store, and it was a clean and common restaurant. The restaurant had an area of approximately 40 square meters. It had 18 seats.

=== Opening ===
TYC opened its doors on 22 April 2023. The pre-opening store introduction video received a total of 1.5 million views on Twitter and TikTok, and the store operated as reservation-only on April 22 and 23.

=== Closing ===
TYC closed at the end of September 2024. The former site is scheduled to reopen in February 2025 by Kakeru as a store for another project. Myoen has announced that "the next store is also a fun project that probably doesn't exist in the world yet".

== Waitstaff ==
The recruitment of employees for TYC was limited to those who had acting experience, such as actors, models, SNS creators, and members of theater circles, and those who were active in the entertainment industry. They practiced improvisation acting for about a month, so they could comfortably play the role of someone's friend with people they just met.

TYC did not provide explicit instruction or manuals, but rather simulated "what would happen if I went to my friend's place of work" by conducting a series of role-playing sessions. Every day after business hours, employees gave each other feedback on how they should respond to given situations to develop their customer service skills, so that no two customers were treated in the same way.

According to actress Karin Hashiguchi, who worked at the café, Myoen was also present at the hiring interview and asked about her motivation for acting and what kind of actress she wanted to be, rather than her experience in the foodservice industry. Hashiguchi said that serving customers at TYC required completely different skills than at ordinary cafes, and cited the need to improvise to match the customers' energy as a point of difficulty. Hashiguchi said that she was not good at improvisation in theater, so she thought that working in TYC would allow her to polish her acting skills.

Singer-songwriter and rapper Sheer, a waitress, applied for the job after seeing a job tweet from Myoen. When the café first opened, she was nervous because many of her colleagues were actors and were doing some kind of artistic work. For the first month or so, she was a little tense about the café's customer service style, which is to treat customers as friends, but by the time the café closed, she felt more at ease with that style of service.

=== Customer service ===
TYC differed in the way they served their customers. When entering the restaurant, instead of saying "Hello, welcome", they address their customers with "Hey, long time no see!" or "You came?!" as if they were friends. According to Myoen, the key to serving customers as friends is to do it with 80% tension, not 100 or 120%. When talking with friends in real life, they do not speak at full tension every time, but rather, most of the time they speak in a slightly relaxed and rough state, so the slightly relaxed temperature leads to a friendly atmosphere. One of the rules of customer service was "never raise hands above the shoulders", and they acted it out by waving their hands below their shoulders, for example. The relaxed atmosphere was said to be "friend-like".

They had a hard time setting up the subtle nuances of what level of distance would be comfortable regarding the relationship between customers and waitstaff. As a result, he decided on a frank customer service style that was reminiscent of his own friend's part-time job, rather than the brightness of a theme park.

== Customers ==
According to Myoen, the fun of TYC lies in the fact that the customers also have to put on an act. From the moment they enter the restaurant, the staff, who have never met them before, talk to them in a friendly manner as if they have known them for a long time, so the customers are required to put aside any embarrassment and act as if they are friends.

According to an interview with entertainment information site Crank In, it is important for customers to "act the part" to enjoy this café, and if they respond with the feeling that they are "visiting a friend's store" based on the viewpoint that their "friends are running the café", the conversation will naturally flow. The waitstaff takes the lead in the conversation, so the customer should just talk with a casual "let's be friends" feeling.

According to Sheer, the waitress, the customers at TYC were very responsive, and most of them spoke casually to the waitresses as if they were friends. The clientele's ages ranged from overwhelmingly younger to older than the waitstaff, and customers came from all over Japan and sometimes even from overseas.

== Menu ==
Since it was necessary for the customers to act "friend-like", the menu names were given in a conversational style to make the experience easier for everyone. The name of the cream soda is "Which is the most popular among the waitstaff?", café latte is "I remember that latte was delicious, wasn't it?" The menu is presented in the form of a "dialogue-style menu", which allows customers to form a conversation by simply reading the menu items out loud. The menu offers about 30 types of drinks, and if you ask for "the one I always drink", a soft drink chosen at random by the staff is suggested.

- "Looks like a busy day, so anything that's ready to go will be fine." (drip coffee)
- "Which is the most popular among the waitstaffs?"(Cream soda)
- "What was that Tanaka always drinking?"(Apple juice)
- "Is this the one we all drank in the summer?" (Tropical Clover Club)
- (pronounce it well while coughing) (cough)... "Brownie please" (Brownie)
- What are some snacks that come out quick and easy? (Olives)

== Social media ==
For restaurants, the content that users post on social networking sites is important, so TYC promoted social networking posts by customers. The café allowed photography inside the restaurant, including the staff, and anyone could easily post about what is going on inside the café. Within a few months of its opening, SNS video of the café had received a total of over 30 million views and 1.5 million likes.

According to Myoen, in a typical restaurant, all the users posts on social networking sites are similar, whether it is about the signature menu or the interior and exterior, but TYC offered different customer service each time, so unique posts were published every day. The constant buzz from the posts continuously drew in new people who had learned about TYC from them. The café did not emphasize repeat customers and did not require the same people to visit repeatedly.

TYC was constructed in a way that it is easy for third parties to spread the word on social networking sites. As an example, the waitstaff stood at a slightly elevated level compared to the customers to make it easier to capture the waitstaff on video from the moment customers open the door and enter the café.

== Reception ==
=== Trend awards ===
The video of TYC spread around TikTok in such a short period of time that it was selected for various awards honoring trends in the first half of the year. It was nominated in the "Gourmet Category" of the "TikTok H1 Trend Awards 2023", ranked first in the "Places and Events Category" of the "2023 Generation Z Hit Trend Ranking" by major web advertising company CyberAgent, and ranked second in the "Experience Category" of the "2023 Trend Grand Prize" by fashion building brand SHIBUYA109, and first place in the ‘things/object’ category in the ‘Generation Z Trend Ranking for the First Half of 2023’ by Trepo, a trend media platform for women in their teens and twenties.

=== Collaborations ===
In February 2024, Japanese alcoholic beverage manufacturer Suntory launched a canned alcoholic beverage jointly developed with TYC. Suntory, which was looking for an opportunity to get younger people to drink alcohol, approached the company in June of the same year, leading to the commercialization of the product. According to a Suntory representative, when they were looking for a way to develop products for the younger generation, a development team visited TYC/TYB and was so impressed that they approached Myoen about commercializing the product and began joint development. The person in charge was intrigued by the communication generated by TYB's worldview. It was unusual for Suntory to collaborate with a store to develop a product, but it was made possible by the enthusiastic support of young employees.

The web commercial for the collaborative product featured actor Ryota Katayose. In April of the same year, due to the positive response to the initial release, the sales channel was expanded and the new product was launched nationwide for a limited time.

=== Appeal ===
Sara Fukamori, a writer for the comprehensive culture website Real Sound, examined the appeal of TYC, and concluded the "TikTok-friendly" design of the café, and two points of ease and comfort attracted Generation Z.

TikTok-friendly design
TYC allowed photography and social networking posts inside the restaurant, allowing visitors to make TikTok videos without requiring them to ask for permission at the restaurant. Furthermore, each visitor's experience was unique since it depended on how they played the role of the staff's friend, allowing for an easy way to generate novel content to share on TikTok.

Common understanding of mutual acting
In Japanese restaurants the staff is professionally obligated to act friendly towards customers. Customers, by contrast, act friendly towards staff of their own volition. Therefore there is a potential fear that a staff-customer relationship may involve a one-sided emotional investment where the customer's friendliness is due a feeling of closeness with the staff which reciprocates the same outward friendliness without any feeling of closeness.
TYC may have eased this fear by creating a common understanding between staff and customer that they were both playing the part of each other's friend.
Professional actors
TYC requiring staff to have professional acting or performance experience may have helped their customers feel more secure that their interactions wouldn't lead to an awkward silence or social embarrassment.

== See also ==
- Theme restaurant
- Improvisational theatre
