= S The Last Policeman - Recovery of Our Future =

S: The Last Policeman - Recovery of Our Future
- Poster
- Ｓ -最後の警官- 奪還 RECOVERY OF OUR FUTURE
- Directed by: Shunichi Hirano
- Screenplay by: Kazunao Furuya
- Based on: S -Saigo no Keikan-
- Release date: August 29, 2015
- Running time: 120 minutes
- Country: Japan
- Language: Japanese
- Box office: ¥510 million

S: The Last Policeman - Recovery of Our Future (Ｓ -最後の警官- 奪還 RECOVERY OF OUR FUTURE) is a 2015 Japanese suspense action drama film directed by Shunichi Hirano and based on the Japanese television drama series S -Saigo no Keikan- (S: The Last Policeman).

== Cast ==
- Osamu Mukai
- Gō Ayano
- Yui Aragaki
- Kazue Fukiishi
- Munetaka Aoki
- Hiroyuki Ikeuchi
- Hiroyuki Hirayama
- Tsutomu Takahashi (actor)
- Yūsuke Hirayama
- Yasukaze Motomiya

== Reception ==
The film grossed ¥204 million on its opening weekend.
