= 41st Japan Academy Film Prize =

Japanese film awards in 2018

- Date: March 2, 2018
- Site: Grand Prince Hotel New Takanawa, Tokyo, Japan
- Hosted by: Toshiyuki Nishida; Rie Miyazawa

Highlights
- Best Picture: The Third Murder
- Most awards: The Third Murder (6)
- Most nominations: The Third Murder (10); Sekigahara (10)

The 41st Japan Academy Film Prize (第41回日本アカデミー賞) is the 41st edition of the Japan Academy Film Prize, an award presented by the Nippon Academy-Sho Association to award excellence in filmmaking. It awarded the best films of 2017 and it took place on March 2, 2018 at the Grand Prince Hotel New Takanawa in Tokyo, Japan.

== Winners & Nominees ==
=== Awards ===
Picture of the Year	Animation of the Year
The Third Murder; Let Me Eat Your Pancreas; Sekigahara; The Miracles of the Namiya General Store; Flower and Sword	The Night Is Short, Walk on Girl; Fireworks, Should We See It from the Side or the Bottom?; Napping Princess; Mary and the Witch's Flower; Detective Conan: Crimson Love Letter
Director of the Year	Screenplay of the Year
Hirokazu Kore-eda – The Third Murder; Kiyoshi Kurosawa – Before We Vanish; Tetsuo Shinohara – Flower and Sword; Masato Harada – Sekigahara; Ryūichi Hiroki – The Miracles of the Namiya General Store	Hirokazu Kore-eda – The Third Murder; Hiroshi Saitō – The Miracles of the Namiya General Store; Yoshiko Morishita – Flower and Sword; Yoji Yamada and Emiko Hiramatsu – What a Wonderful Family! 2; Tomoko Yoshida – Let Me Eat Your Pancreas
Outstanding Performance by an Actor in a Leading Role	Outstanding Performance by an Actress in a Leading Role
Masaki Suda – Wilderness: Part One; Yo Oizumi – The Last Shot in the Bar; Junichi Okada – Sekigahara; Takeru Satoh – The 8-Year Engagement; Tatsuya Fujiwara – Memoirs of a Murderer	Yū Aoi – Birds Without Names; Yui Aragaki – Mixed Doubles; Tao Tsuchiya – The 8-Year Engagement; Masami Nagasawa – Before We Vanish; Yuriko Yoshitaka – Yurigokoro
Outstanding Performance by an Actor in a Supporting Role	Outstanding Performance by an Actress in a Supporting Role
Kōji Yakusho – The Third Murder; Toshiyuki Nishida – The Miracles of the Namiya General Store; Masahiko Nishimura – What a Wonderful Family! 2; Ryuhei Matsuda – The Last Shot in the Bar; Nijirō Murakami – Mukoku; Kōji Yakusho – Sekigahara	Suzu Hirose – The Third Murder; Machiko Ono – The Miracles of the Namiya General Store; Keiko Kitagawa – The Last Shot in the Bar; Yui Natsukawa – What a Wonderful Family! 2; Hiroko Yakushimaru – The 8-Year Engagement
Outstanding Achievement in Music	Outstanding Achievement in Cinematography
Keiichi Suzuki – Outrage Coda; Harumi Fūki – Sekigahara; Takatsugu Muramatsu – The 8-Year Engagement; Ludovico Einaudi – The Third Murder; Jin – Kiseki: Sobito of That Day	Takahide Shibanushi – Sekigahara; Tokushō Kikumura – Flower and Sword; Kōzō Shibasaki – Destiny: The Tale of Kamakura; Mikiya Takimoto – The Third Murder; Masashi Chikamori – What a Wonderful Family! 2
Outstanding Achievement in Lighting Direction	Outstanding Achievement in Art Direction
Takaaki Miyanishi – Sekigahara; Tatsuya Osada – Flower and Sword; Nariyuki Ueda – Destiny: The Tale of Kamakura; Norikiyo Fujii – The Third Murder; Kōichi Watanabe – What a Wonderful Family! 2	Tomoko Kurata – Flower and Sword; Tomoko Kurata and Hisayuki Kobayashi – What a Wonderful Family! 2; Anri Jōjō – Destiny: The Tale of Kamakura; Tetsuo Harada – Sekigahara; Tomoyuki Maruo and Rihito Nakagawa – The Miracles of the Namiya General Store
Outstanding Achievement in Sound Recording	Outstanding Achievement in Film Editing
Masato Yano – Sekigahara; Satoshi Ozaki – Flower and Sword; Kazumi Kishida – What a Wonderful Family! 2; Yoshifumi Kureishi – Outrage Coda; Kazuhiko Tomita – The Third Murder	Hirokazu Kore-eda – The Third Murder; Hirohide Abe – Flower and Sword; Iwao Ishii – What a Wonderful Family! 2; Takeshi Kitano and Yoshinori Ota – Outrage Coda; Masato Harada – Sekigahara
Outstanding Foreign Language Film	Newcomer of the Year
La La Land; Dunkirk; Hidden Figures; Beauty and the Beast; Miss Sloane	Ayami Nakajo – Let's Go, Jets!; Minami Hamabe – Let Me Eat Your Pancreas; Takumi Kitamura – Let Me Eat Your Pancreas; Ryoma Takeuchi – Teiichi: Battle of Supreme High
