= Shinichi Hatori =

Japanese announcer (born 1971)

- 羽鳥 慎一
- Born: 24 March 1971 (age 55); Ageo, Saitama, Japan
- Other name: Bird
- Education: Waseda University Faculty of Political Economy Department of Economics
- Occupations: Free announcer; tarento; television presenter
- Years active: 1994–present
- Agent: Take Off (2011–)
- Style: News; informal; entertainment
- Television: Shinichi Hatori Morning Show; Guruguru Ninety Nine; Jinsei ga Kawaru 1-funkan no Fukaīhanashi; Morning Bird; Zoom In!! Super; Zoom In!! Saturday
- Spouse: Chiho Watanabe (m. 2014)
- Website: Official profile

Shinichi Hatori (羽鳥 慎一, Hatori Shin'ichi; born 24 March 1971 in Ageo, Saitama) is a Japanese free announcer, tarento, and television presenter. He is a former Nippon TV announcer. He is currently represented with Take Off. He is nicknamed Bird (バード, Bādo) by Tatsunori Hara.

== Filmography ==
=== TV series ===
==== Current appearances ====
Year	Title	Network	Notes	Ref
1998	Guruguru Ninety Nine	NTV	Since NTV Announcer era	
2008	Jinsei ga Kawaru 1-funkan no Fukaīhanashi	NTV	Since NTV Announcer era	
2013	Ano News de Tokusuru Hito Sonsuru Hito	NTV		
2015	Shinichi Hatori Morning Show	TV Asahi		
2015	Chikarauta	NTV		
2016	Hashimoto×Hatori no Bangumi	TV Asahi		
2021 – 2025	Show Channel	NTV		

One-shot appearances

Year	Title	Network	Notes
2009	NTV Kei Ongaku no Saiten: Best Artist	NTV	Since NTV Announcer era
2011	Birdman Rally	YTV	Moderator, commentator
2011	24-Jikan TV: Ai wa Chikyū o Sukuu	NTV	General presenter
2013	Suntory 1 Man-ri no Daiku "10000 Freude"	TBS, HBC, CBC, RKB, TBC	General presenter
2013	The Music Day	NTV	Presenter

==== Former appearances ====
===== As Nippon TV announcer =====
Year	Title	Role	Notes	Ref.
	Osugi to Peeco no Kanemochi A-sama×Binbō B-sama			
	NNN News Plus 1	Sportscaster, newsreader		
	Kin no A-sama×Gin no A-sama			
	Donmai!! Sports & Wide			
	Zoom In!! Asa!			
	Zoom In!! Super			
	Zoom In!! Saturday			
	Tunnels no Namade Daradara ika sete!!			
	Shinshun Sports Special Hakone Ekiden			
	Geki Kūkan Pro-yagu			
	Gokujō no Tsukiyo			
	Monomane Battle			
	NNN24			
	Ojisans 11			
2001	Mayonaka no Arashi	Moderator		
2010	Tensai janakute mo Yume o tsukameru 10 no Hōsoku		Co-presented with Tetsuya Takeda and Becky	

===== As free announcer =====
Year	Title	Network	Notes
2011	Morning Bird	TV Asahi	
2011	Shinichi Hatori: Toku Mori! Kayō Saturday	NBS	Although he was the current presenter of the Zoom In!! series at the time, Kazuo Tokumitsu, also a former NTV announcer, was the original host, he realized when he was directly offered a vacation by Hatori.
2011	Koi no Synchro-ritsu	NHK-G	Presenter
2012	NTV Kei Ongaku no Saiten: Ongaku nochi kara 2012	NTV	
2012	Mirai Theater	NTV	
2015	Kyaraoke 18-ban	NTV	

==== TV drama ====
Year	Title	Role	Network	Notes	Ref.
2007	Bambino!	Customer A	NTV	Episode 6	
2013	Machigawa re chatta Otoko	Kokichi Hasegawa	Fuji TV		
2015	Aibō Season 13	Reporter	TV Asahi	Episode 10	

==== Anime ====
Title	Network	Notes
Glitter Force	ABC	Cameo

=== Films ===
Year	Title	Role	Notes
2004	Godzilla: Final Wars	TV reporter	
2005	House of Himiko	Announcer	
2005	Always Sanchōme no Yūhi	Passerby	
2007	Always Zoku Sanchōme no Yūhi	Newspaper reporter	
2009	20 Seiki Shōnen Dai 2-shō: Saigo no Kibō	Announcer	
2009	Yatterman	Announcer	
2009	Gokusen: The Movie		Cameo
2009	Carrasco Rider		Cameo
2010	Shodo Girls	Fishmonger's husband	
2010	Beck		Cameo
2017	Tori Girl		

=== Anime films ===
Year	Title	Role	Ref.
2003	Nasu: Summer in Andalusia	Play-by-play announcer	
2008	Ponyo	Announcer	
2009	Summer Wars	Announcer, Keishume Ikezawa's father	
2010	Arrietty	Postman	
2012	Crayon Shin-chan: The Storm Called!: Me and the Space Princess	Himawari announcer Shin Hatori	
2020	Stand by Me Doraemon 2		

=== Music videos ===
Title
TVXQ "Kiss the Baby Sky"
Funky Monkey Babys "Hero"

=== Magazines ===
Year	Title
2007	TV Japan

== Discography ==
Year	Title	Notes
2010	Shodo Girls Original Soundtrack	Recorder performance in "Yukari to Fue"

== Videography ==
Title
Zoom shika Shiranai Fanmon no subete: Me no Mae ni wa Mirai ga Matte iru
