= Ride Your Wave =

2019 Japanese animated film

- Theatrical release poster
- Directed by: Masaaki Yuasa
- Screenplay by: Reiko Yoshida
- Produced by: Eunyoung Choi; Yuka Okayasu
- Starring: Ryota Katayose; Rina Kawaei; Honoka Matsumoto; Kentaro Ito
- Cinematography: Toru Fukushi
- Edited by: Kiyoshi Hirose
- Music by: Michiru Oshima
- Production company: Science Saru
- Distributed by: Toho
- Release dates: June 10, 2019 (Annecy); June 21, 2019
- Running time: 96 minutes
- Country: Japan
- Language: Japanese
- Box office: $4 million (worldwide)

Ride Your Wave (Japanese: きみと、波にのれたら, Hepburn: Kimi to, Nami ni Noretara) is a 2019 Japanese animated romantic fantasy film directed by Masaaki Yuasa and produced by Science Saru. It premiered at the Annecy International Animated Film Festival on June 10, 2019, and was released in Japan on June 21, 2019.

== Plot ==
19-year-old Hinako Mukaimizu moves to an oceanside town to attend college and go surfing, without future thoughts. When a fireworks display sets her apartment building ablaze, she is rescued by Minato Hinageshi, a 21-year-old firefighter with a strong sense of justice. Hinako is drawn to his capable personality, and they bond when he learns how to surf. They spend time together. After telling Hinako the waves are the best to surf in after Christmas because if you make a wish it will come true, he goes to the beach the next day by himself and goes surfing without Hinako, but dies when attempting to save a jetskiier.

Hinako is distraught by his death and moves to an apartment away from the beach. One day, she finds out he appears in water whenever she sings "Brand New Story", a song the two of them often sang together. While the others cannot see him, Hinako and Minato spend time with each other again, even in public. However, Minato is reminded of his mortality, after realizing he cannot physically touch Hinako and when his co-worker, Wasabi, confesses to her. He asks Hinako to move on with her life, but she declines. However, she realizes she is too reliant on him after she stops him from going to heaven. When Hinako goes to pay her respects at Minato's house, his sister Yōko tells her what inspired Minato to become a firefighter. Hinako learns she was the one who saved Minato from drowning when they were young. When she unlocks the phone, she reads the drafted text message, telling her to "ride her own wave." She enrolls in a lifeguard training course, hoping to stop being dependent on Minato. Meanwhile, Yōko confesses to Wasabi, reminding him he had inspired her to return to school when she was bullied.

At her part-time job, Yōko overhears the same group that set off the previous fireworks planning to do so again at the abandoned building housing a large Christmas tree. Hinako accompanies her as they tail the group to collect evidence. The fireworks cause the building set ablaze, and Hinako and Yōko are trapped. However, Hinako summons Minato, who sends a wave of water up the building, extinguishing the fire. Hinako and Yōko ride on a backboard down the wave. After exchanging final farewells with Yōko, Wasabi, and Hinako, Minato's spirit ascends to heaven. The next Christmas, Hinako, Yōko and Wasabi, the latter two now dating, visit the Chiba Port Tower to celebrate Hinako receiving her lifeguard certification. As Yōko and Wasabi leave, Hinako sings to a fountain, but Minato does not appear. The tower reads a message he wrote for her the previous year and Hinako breaks down. Afterwards, Hinako continues her lifeguard duty and surfing.

== Voice cast ==
Minato Hinageshi (雛罌粟港, Hinageshi Minato)
Voiced by: Ryota Katayose, Tomohisa Yamazaki (young) (Japanese); Joey Richter (English)
A 21-year-old firefighter interested in Hinako, whom he calls a "hero". He is also a sous-chef.
Hinako Mukaimizu (向水ひな子, Mukaimizu Hinako)
Voiced by: Rina Kawaei, Hina Kino (young) (Japanese); Merit Leighton (English)
A 19-year-old college student, part-time florist, and a surfer.
Yōko Hinageshi (雛罌粟洋子, Hinageshi Yōko)
Voiced by: Honoka Matsumoto (Japanese); Sarah Anne Williams (English)
Minato's younger sister and a high school student working part-time at a café. Her nickname is blue-ringed octopus.
Wasabi Kawamura (川村山葵, Kawamura Wasabi)
Voiced by: Kentaro Ito (Japanese); Michael Johnston (English)
Minato's firefighting partner.

== Production ==
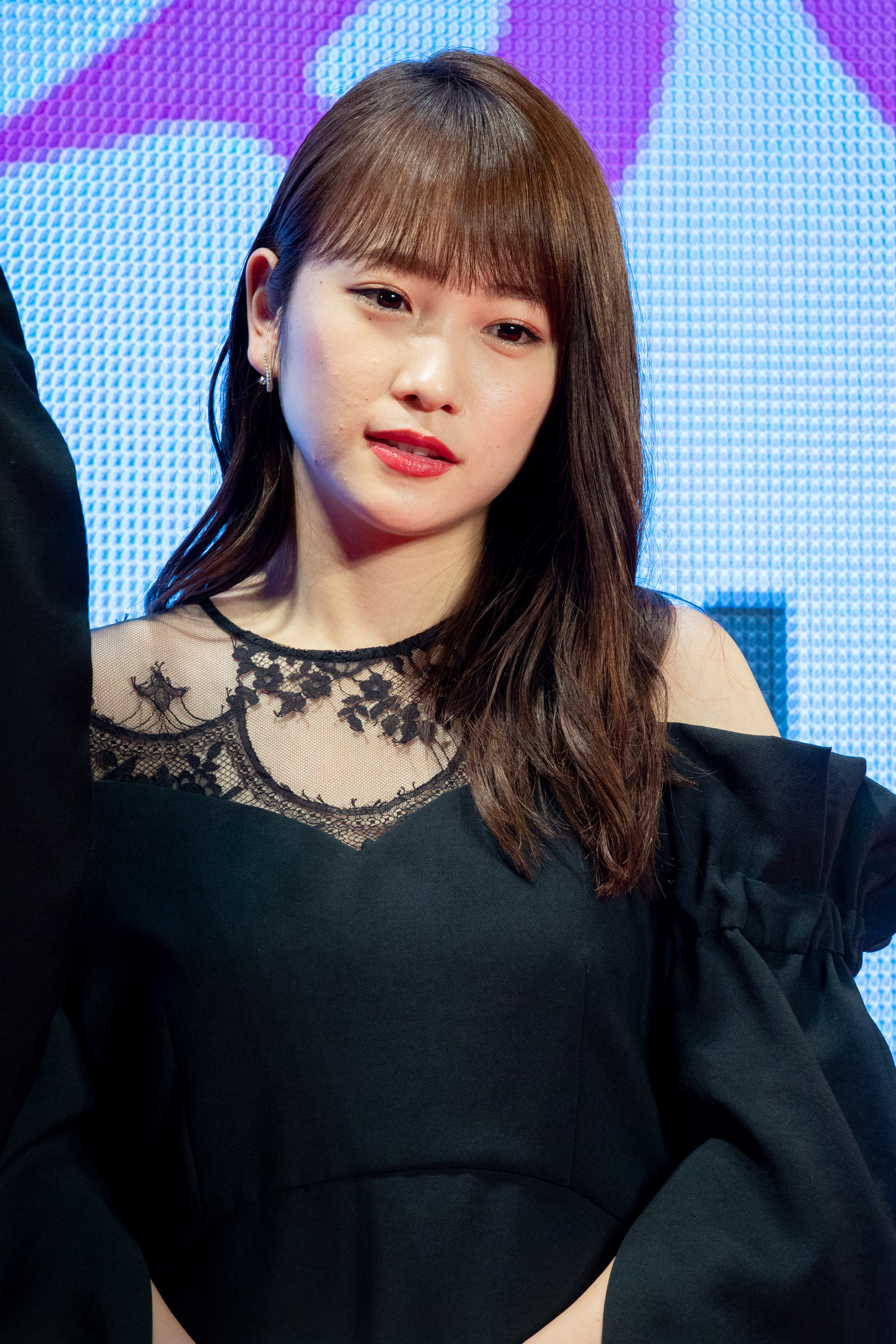
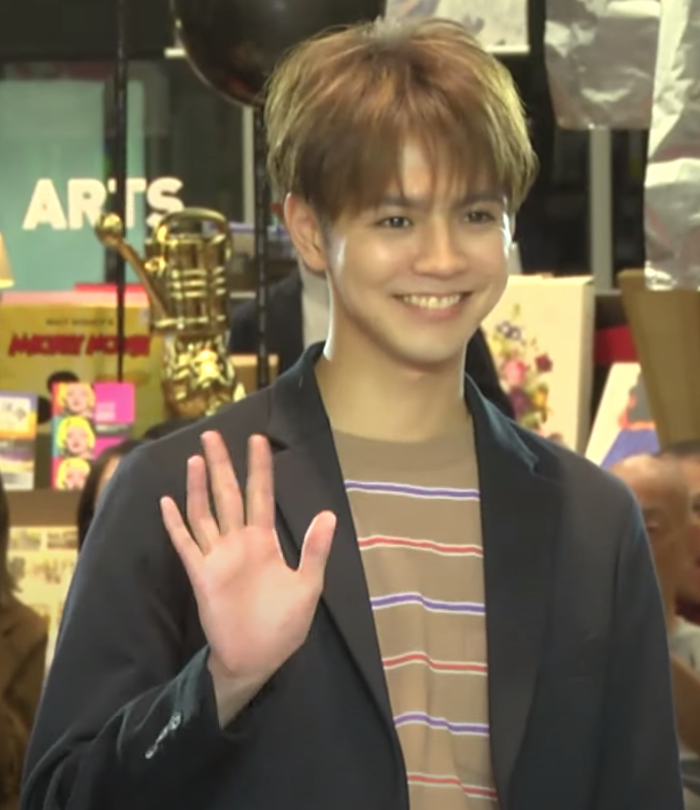
Rina Kawaei (left, pictured in 2018) and Ryota Katayose (right, pictured in 2019) starred as Hinako and Minato in the film.

The film was announced at the Tokyo International Film Festival in 2018, with Yuasa served as a director. He described it as a "simple romantic comedy" that will have "a lot of exciting scenes", including some depicting the contrast between water and fire. Yuasa compared life to "riding a wave", using it as the basis for the story. The film was produced by Science Saru. Reiko Yoshida served as the screenwriter and Michiru Oshima served as a music composer. Rina Kawaei and Generations from Exile Tribe member Ryota Katayose joined the cast on leading roles in January 2019, with the film being Katayose's first voice acting role. Honoka Matsumoto and Kentaro Ito joined the cast on supporting roles in February 2019. The film's theme song is "Brand New Story" by Generations from Exile Tribe. A music video animated by Science Saru, featuring the members and new original scenes from the film, released on June 21, 2019. To promote the film, a two-chapter manga adaptation by Machi Kiachi was serialized in Deluxe BetsuComi, which contains an original story about Hinako and Minato. On July 2, 2019, GKIDS announced they had licensed the film in North America and was released in 2020.

== Release ==
The film premiered in Japan on June 21, 2019. It premiered in the United Kingdom at Scotland Loves Anime on October 11, 2019, ahead of a home-video release via distributor Anime Limited on November 23, 2020. JL Film Entertainment released the film in China. It was delayed and released on December 7, 2019. The film was released theatrically in North America by GKIDS, first as a one-day special screening on February 19 in cooperation with Fathom Events, and subsequently via traditional release on February 21, 2020. It was later released by GKIDS and Shout! Factory on Blu-ray and DVD on August 4, 2020, with a streaming release on HBO Max following on January 12, 2021.

== Reception ==
The film was released in 299 theaters across Japan on June 21, 2019, and debuted at ninth in the opening week with ¥80 million. On review aggregator Rotten Tomatoes, the film holds a 93% approval rating based on 29 reviews, with an average rating of 7.8/10. On Metacritic, which assigns a weighted average score out of 100 to reviews from mainstream critics, the film received an average score of 65 out of 100 based on 10 reviews, indicating "generally favorable reviews".

Matt Schley from The Japan Times gave the film four out of five stars, complimenting the "charming cast of characters," while mentioning the film seemed too "normal" for a work by Yuasa. Writing for the Los Angeles Times, Charles Solomon called the film Yuasa's "best anime yet", citing its believable characters and polished animation style. Peter Debruge from Variety noted that the film's use of a hit single as its theme song helped broaden its appeal to a more mainstream audience, but also criticized it for pushing its romance themes too strong.

The film became one of the Jury Recommended Works in the Animation category at the 23rd Japan Media Arts Festival in 2020.

== Accolades ==
Year	Award	Category	Recipient	Result
2019	Annecy International Animated Film Festival	Cristal du long metrage	Ride Your Wave	Nominated
2019	Shanghai International Film Festival	Best Animation	Ride Your Wave	Won
2019	Fantasia International Film Festival	Best Animated Feature	Ride Your Wave	Won
2019	Sitges International Fantastic Film Festival	Best Animated Feature	Ride Your Wave	Won
2019	Scotland Loves Anime	Jury Award (Golden Partridge)	Ride Your Wave	Won
2020	Mainichi Film Awards	Best Animation Film	Ride Your Wave	Nominated
2020	Florida Film Critics Circle	Best Animation Film	Ride Your Wave	Nominated
2020	48th Annie Awards	Annie Award for Best Animated Feature – Independent	Ride Your Wave	Nominated
2020	48th Annie Awards	Annie Award for Outstanding Achievement for Directing in a Feature Production	Masaaki Yuasa	Nominated
