= Tori Girl =

- Directed by: Tsutomu Hanabusa
- Screenplay by: Izumi Takahashi
- Based on: Tori Girl by Kō Nakamura
- Starring: Tao Tsuchiya
- Cinematography: Takashi Komatsu
- Edited by: Naoichirō Sagara
- Music by: Kōji Endō
- Distributed by: Showgate
- Release date: September 1, 2017
- Running time: 98 minutes
- Country: Japan
- Language: Japanese

Tori Girl (トリガール！, Tori Gāru; "Bird Girl") is a 2017 comedy movie from Japan, directed by Tsutomu Hanabusa. The film featured at the 2017 Melbourne Japanese Film Festival. It is based on the novel "Tori Girl" by Kō Nakamura (published 2012 by KADOKAWA MAGAZINES).

== Plot ==
Yukina (Tao Tsukiya) has always been an easygoing type. However, while trying to get into architecture, she ends up through no fault of her own, in the Yuhi Institute of Technology, a second rate University, in the engineering faculty.

The engineering course Yukina takes is full of male engineering otaku nerds. In class, she meets Kazumi (Elaiza Ikeda), the only other girl in the course. Kazumi has come to the University specially to compete in the institute's Birdman Rally, a long running competition in human powered flight.

They visit the man powered flight club. While there, Kei, another student and also the president of the club, immediately rushes over to her. He compliments her on her body, because he sees it as suitable for the human-powered flight. She mistakenly interprets it as him being interested in her. While initially being half-hearted about the attempt, she quickly gets involved in the effort. She enters a test of potential pilots for the competition, using exercise bikes, and because of her previous regular use of a "10 kilo grandmother bike" for daily transport, she easily comes first.

Yukina meets the rogue Sakaba (Shotaro Mamiya), who has been missing for some time. He is the long-standing pilot in the plane. He is aggressive and unfriendly, though serious and dedicated to the team effort.

While initially, Sakaba and Kei are the designated pilots, Kei injures his leg in a crash of the plane in a test run. Though Sakaba and Yukina continues clash as their natural personalities conflict, Sakaba chooses her to replace Kei as it appears his injuries will not improve in time.

Yukina learns that the long-term goal of the club is to not only achieve flight, but to fly out to Takei island to see a buddhist monk who looks like Japanese comedian and actor Jiro Todoroki lives. So far, no one has flown this far or seen the monk.

Yukina and Sakaba continue to train, despite the natural clash of their personalities, and prepare to compete at the long running Japan International birdman rally at Lake Biwa.

== Cast ==
- Tao Tsuchiya as Yukina Toriyama
- Shotaro Mamiya as Taishi Sakaba
- Mahiro Takasugi as Kei Takahashi
- Elaiza Ikeda as Kazumi Shimamura
- Yūma Yamoto
- Shinichi Hatori
