= Ani ni Aisaresugite Komattemasu =

Japanese manga series and its adaptations

- Cover of vol. 1, first released on October 26, 2015

兄に愛されすぎて困ってます
- Genre: Romance
- Manga
- Written by: Rina Yagami
- Published by: Shogakukan
- Imprint: Flower Comics
- Magazine: Sho-Comi
- Original run: June 21, 2015 – March 20, 2018
- Volumes: 11
- Television drama
- Directed by: Hayato Kawai
- Written by: Yuko Matsuda
- Original network: Nippon TV
- Original run: April 13, 2017 – May 11, 2017
- Episodes: 5
- Live-action film
- Directed by: Hayato Kawai
- Written by: Yuko Matsuda
- Released: June 30, 2017
- Runtime: 99 minutes
- icon

Ani ni Aisaresugite Komattemasu (Japanese: 兄に愛されすぎて困ってます; lit. "My Brother Loves Me So Much That It Bothers Me", titled My Brother Loves Me Too Much internationally for the live-action film) is a Japanese manga series by Rina Yagami. Ani ni Aisaresugite Komattemasu was serialized in the semi-monthly shōjo manga magazine Sho-Comi from June 21, 2015, to March 20, 2018. By 2017, the series sold more than 1.8 million copies in print.

A live-action film adaptation was released in Japan on June 30, 2017. To promote the live-action film, a television drama adaptation featuring the same cast was broadcast on Nippon TV from April 13, 2017, (Note: Nippon TV lists the broadcast date as April 12, 2017, at 0:59, which is April 13, 2017, at 12:59 a.m.) to May 11, 2017.

== Plot ==
High school student Setoka was adopted into the Tachibana family as a child, and despite only finding out recently, she still lives a peaceful life with them. She has a close relationship with her older brother, Haruka, but recently, he has started becoming distant from her. One night, Haruka admits to Setoka that he has always loved her romantically. Setoka navigates through her feelings for Haruka, while realizing that several other boys are also attracted to her.

== Characters ==
Setoka Tachibana (橘 せとか, Tachibana Setoka)
Portrayed by: Tao Tsuchiya
Setoka is an unpopular but romantic high school student who was adopted into the Tachibana family. She has a close relationship with her older brother, Haruka, and constantly worries about him.
Haruka Tachibana (橘 はるか, Tachibana Haruka)
Portrayed by: Ryota Katayose
Haruka is Setoka's older brother who is delinquent and described as "cool". He has been in love with Setoka since they were young and has known that they are not blood-related since childhood.
Takane Serikawa (芹川 高嶺, Serikawa Takane)
Portrayed by: Yudai Chiba
Takane is Setoka and Haruka's childhood friend and her first love.
Chinatsu Mioka (美丘 千夏, Mioka Chinatsu)
Portrayed by: Ito Ohno
Chinatsu is Haruka's friend. He is later revealed to be an otokonoko who crossdresses as a girl, as well as having feelings for Setoka. His older brother is Chiaki. In the live-action film adaptation, the character was renamed Chiyuki Mioka (美丘 千雪, Mioka Chiyuki) and changed into a girl.
Chiaki Mioka (美丘 千秋, Mioka Chiaki)
Portrayed by: Takuya Kusakawa
Chiaki is a womanizer who Setoka meets at a group date. He is intrigued by Setoka's personality and later falls in love with her for real. He becomes Setoka's first boyfriend, but they break up after Setoka realizes she is truly in love with Haruka. Chiaki is Chinatsu's older brother.
Kunimitsu Serikawa (芹川 国光, Serikawa Kunimitsu)
Portrayed by: Yosuke Sugino
Kunimitsu is Takane's younger brother.
Aika Himegami (姫神 亜依加, Himegami Aika)
Portrayed by: Asuka Kawazu
Aika is the winner of the school's beauty contest and sets her sights on Haruka. In the live-action film adaptation, the character was renamed Aika Kirino (桐野 愛華, Kirino Aika).
Miyu (みゆー, Miyū)
Portrayed by: Ai Moritaka
Miyu is Setoka's best friend.
Hokuto Yataka (矢高 北斗, Yataka Hokuto)
Hokuto is Setoka's blood-related older brother and a student teacher at her school. Rina Yagami wanted to introduce a character who would be Setoka's real older brother; she took the name of the character from an original character created for the live-action film adaptation, who was played by comedian Yūsuke Inoue from the comedy duo Non Style. Hokuto was intentionally created to be the opposite of the character that Inoue had portrayed.
Suzuki (鈴木)
Portrayed by: Fūju Kamio
Suzuki is Setoka's classmate. He and Setoka first express interest in each other until he is deterred by Haruka.

== Media ==
=== Manga ===
Ani ni Aisaresugite Komattemasu was written and illustrated by Rina Yagami. It was serialized in the semi-monthly shōjo manga magazine Sho-Comi from 2015's issue 14 released on June 21, 2015, to 2018's issue 8 released on March 20, 2018. The chapters were later released in eleven bound volumes by Shogakukan under the Flower Comics imprint. Volume 11 also includes a 16-page prologue to Yagami's next work, Wake Atte Kinō Ubawaremashita.

In 2018, Yagami stated through an interview with Natalie that she felt the only way she could create a happy ending for Setoka and Haruka was for them to not be blood-related siblings. She sought to introduce this plot point early on, so that she could focus on the "action", using the 1998 American film Die Hard as an example. Yagami stated the fast pace of Ani ni Aisaresugite Komattemasu was partially due to the Sho-Comi being released on a semi-monthly basis.

| No. | Japanese release date | Japanese ISBN |
|---|---|---|
| 1 | October 26, 2015 | 978-4091378132 |
| 2 | January 26, 2016 | 978-4091382412 |
| 3 | March 25, 2016 | 978-4091383303 |
| 4 | September 26, 2016 | 978-4091385093 |
| 4.5 | December 26, 2016 | 978-4091388193 |
| 5 | March 24, 2017 | 978-4091391605 |
| 6 | June 9, 2017 | 978-4091393692 |
| 7 | June 9, 2017 | 978-4091393708 |
| 8 | October 26, 2017 | 978-4091397478 |
| 9 | December 26, 2017 | 978-4091397836 |
| 10 | February 26, 2018 | 978-4098700455 |
| 11 | May 25, 2018 | 978-4098700868 |

=== Film ===
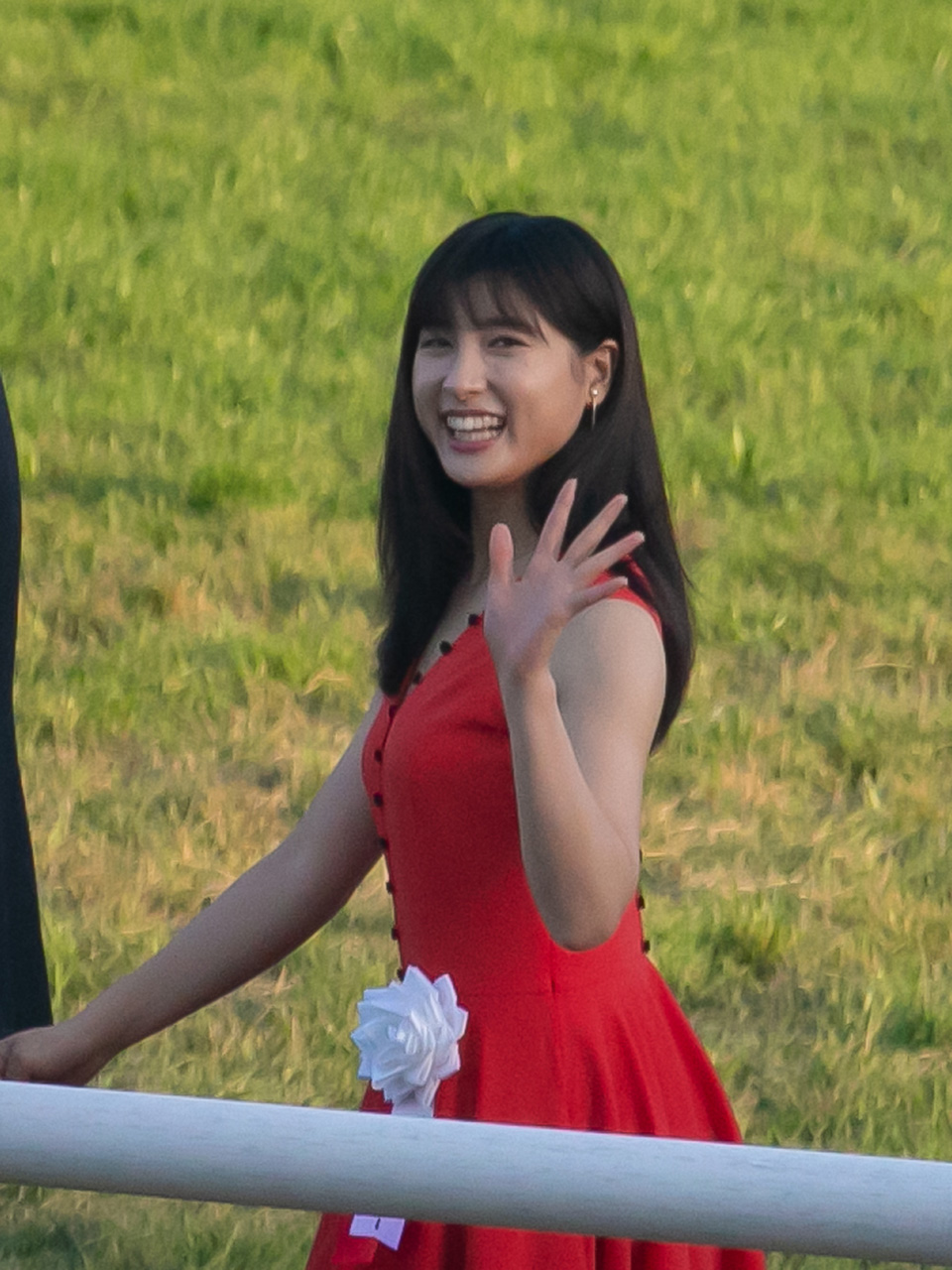
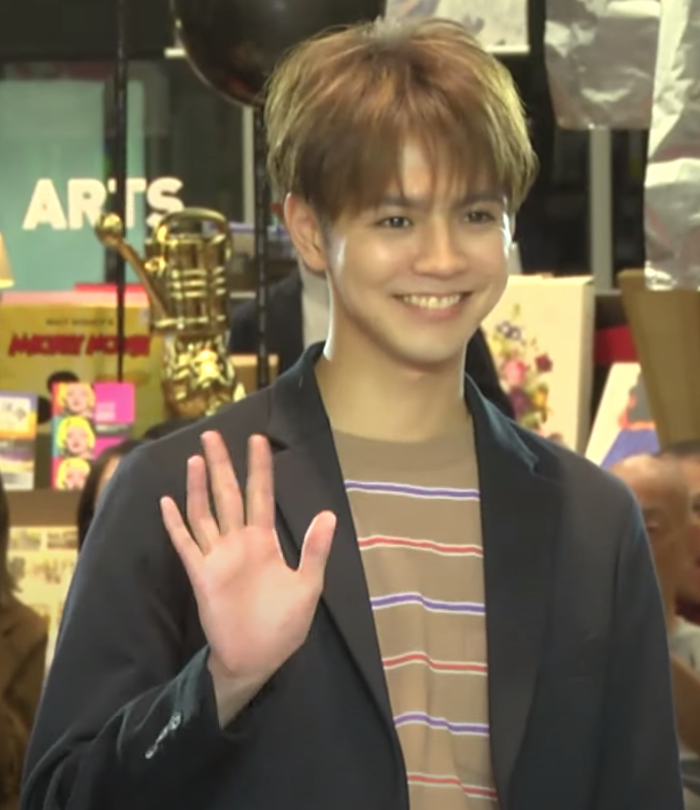
Tao Tsuchiya (left, pictured in 2018) and Ryota Katayose (right, pictured in 2019) co-starred in the live-action film and drama adaptations.

A live-action film adaptation of Ani ni Aisaresugite Komattemasu was announced on September 19, 2016. The film stars Generations from Exile Tribe member Ryota Katayose as Haruka, Tao Tsuchiya as Setoka, and Yudai Chiba as Takane. Additional cast members include Bullet Train member Takuya Kusakawa and Yosuke Sugino.

At the time of the film project's announcement, only two volumes of the manga had been released. The film was produced by the same production team as the live-action film adaptation of Defying Kurosaki-kun. It was directed by Hayato Kawai and written by Yuko Matsuda. The film's theme song, "Sora", was performed by Generations from Exile Tribe. "Koise yo Watashi" and "Your Melody..." were both performed by Leola and featured as insert songs.

The film adaptation was released nationwide in 251 theaters in Japan on June 30, 2017, opening at No. 3 on opening weekend and grossing a total of ¥9.26 billion. It was released on Blu-ray and DVD on January 1, 2018.

=== Television drama ===
To promote the live-action film adaptation, a five-episode promotional television drama was broadcast weekly on Nippon TV from April 13, 2017, to May 11, 2017. The main cast reprised their roles from the film. The drama adaptation was released onto Blu-ray and DVD on May 11, 2017. In addition, a special virtual reality video where the viewer can experience the events of the drama and film from Setoka's perspective was released on dTV on March 16, 2017.

==== Episodes ====
| No. | Title | Directed by | Written by | Original release date |
|---|---|---|---|---|
| 1 | "My Brother Loves Me So Much It Bothers Me!"; Transliteration: "Ani ni Aisaresugite Komattemasu!" (Japanese: 兄に愛されすぎて困ってます！) | Hayato Kawai | Yuko Matsuda | April 13, 2017 |
| 2 | "My Heart Racing from Our First Date Bothers Me!"; Transliteration: "Hatsu Dēto ni Dokidoki Shite Komattemasu!" (Japanese: 初デートにドキドキして困ってます！) | Hayato Kawai | Yuko Matsuda | April 20, 2017 |
| 3 | "Reuniting with My First Love Bothers Me!"; Transliteration: "Hatsukoi no Hito ni Saikai Shite Komattemasu!" (Japanese: 初恋の人に再会して困ってます！) | Hayato Kawai | Yuko Matsuda | April 27, 2017 |
| 4 | "Encountering a Real Kiss Bothers Me!"; Transliteration: "Hontō no Kisu ni Sōgū Shite Komattemasu!" (Japanese: 本当のキスに遭遇して困ってます！) | Hayato Kawai | Yuko Matsuda | May 4, 2017 |
| 5 | "These Hot Guys Love Me So Much It Bothers Me!"; Transliteration: "Ikemenzu ni Aisaresugite Komattemasu!" (Japanese: イケメンズに愛されすぎて困ってます！) | Hayato Kawai | Yuko Matsuda | May 11, 2017 |

== Reception ==
In 2017, Ani ni Aisaresugite Komattemasu sold a consecutive total of 1.8 million copies in print.

Kono Manga ga Sugoi! reviewed the live-action film adaptation favorably, stating that there were many scenarios that were "funny" and "heart-pounding".
