= RSK Sanyo Broadcasting =

Radio and television station in Okayama

Coordinates: 34°39′52.5″N 133°55′57.5″E

RSK Holdings Co., Ltd.

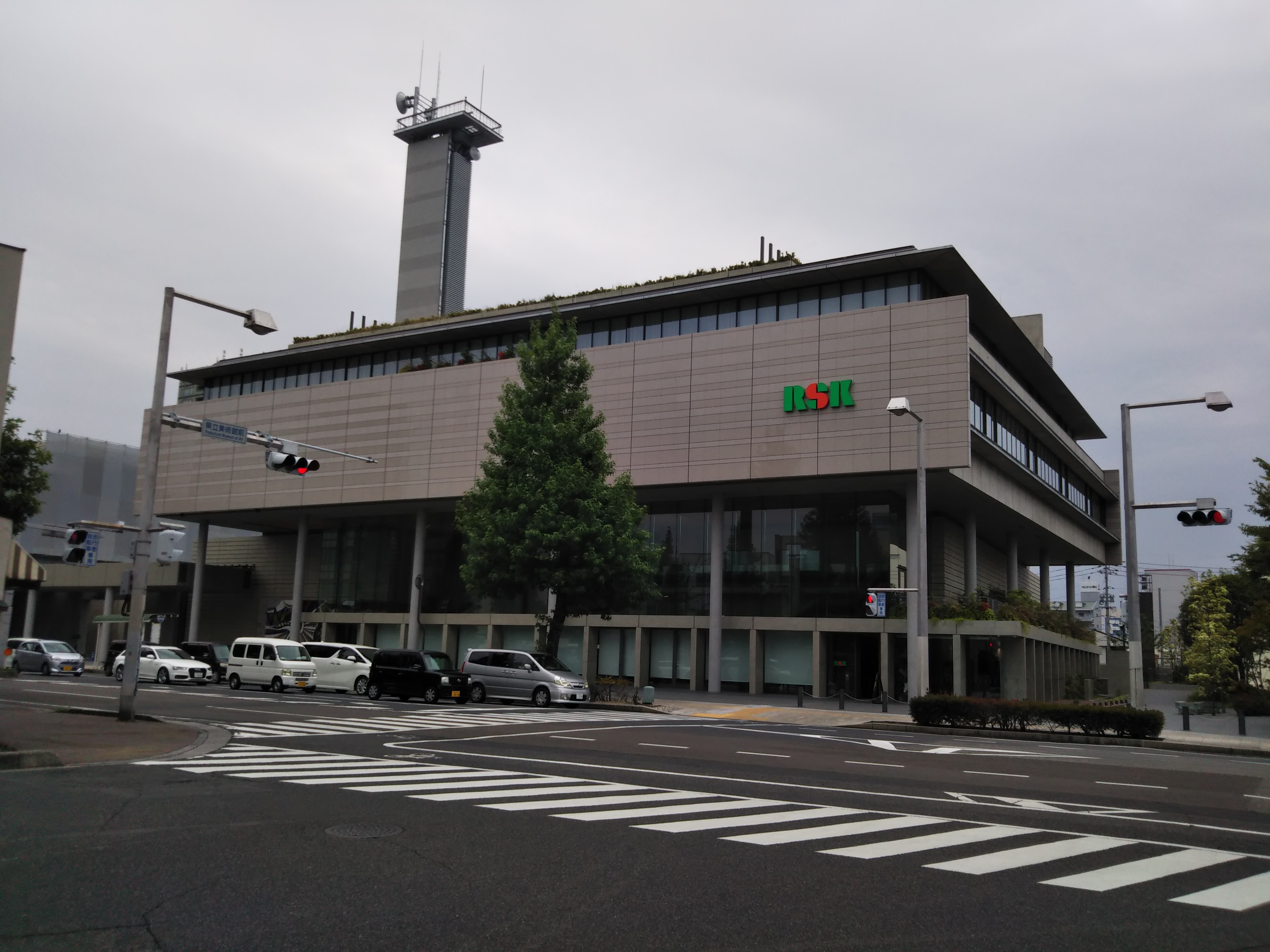
- Headquarters in Kita-ku, Okayama
- Native name: RSKホールディングス株式会社
- Formerly: Sanyo Broadcasting Co., Ltd. (1953-2018)
- Company type: Kabushiki kaisha
- Industry: Media
- Founded: April 1, 1953; 73 years ago
- Headquarters: Marunouchi, Kita-ku, Okayama, Okayama Prefecture, Japan
- Subsidiaries: RSK Sanyo Broadcasting; RSK Provision; RSK Service
- Website: rsk.co.jp/company/

JOYR
- Okayama; Japan
- Broadcast area: Okayama
- Frequencies: 1494 kHz (AM); 91.4 MHz (FM)
- Branding: RSK Radio; RSK

Programming
- Language: Japanese
- Format: Talk, Sports
- Affiliations: Japan Radio Network (JRN)/ National Radio Network (NRN)

Ownership
- Owner: RSK Sanyo Broadcasting Co., Ltd.

History
- First air date: October 1, 1953; 72 years ago
- Call sign meaning: Sanyo Hoso Kabushikigaisha (Radio)

Technical information
- Licensing authority: MIC
- Power: 10 kW

Links
- Website: www.rsk.co.jp/radio/

JOYR-DTV
- Okayama and Kagawa; Japan
- City: Okayama
- Channels: Digital: 21 (VHF); Virtual: 6
- Branding: RSK Television; RSK

Programming
- Affiliations: Japan News Network

Ownership
- Owner: RSK Sanyo Broadcasting Co., Ltd.

History
- First air date: June 1, 1958; 68 years ago
- Former call signs: JOYR-TV (1953-2011)
- Former channel numbers: 11 (analog VHF, 1953-2011)

Technical information
- Licensing authority: MIC

Links
- Website: rsk.co.jp/tv/

Corporate information
- Company
- Native name: RSK山陽放送株式会社
- Company type: Subsidiary
- Industry: Radio and television network
- Founded: May 25, 2018; 8 years ago
- Headquarters: Tejincho, Kita-ku, Okayama, Okayama Prefecture, Japan
- Owner: RSK Holdings Co., Ltd.
- Website: www.rsk.co.jp

RSK Sanyo Broadcasting Co., Ltd. (RSK山陽放送株式会社, Āruesukē San'yō Hōsō Kabushikigaisha) is a Japanese television and radio broadcaster in Okayama and Kagawa. The abbreviation, RSK originates in the former name in Japanese (ラジオ山陽株式会社, Radio San'yō Kabushikigaisha). It is affiliated with Japan Radio Network (JRN), National Radio Network (NRN), and Japan News Network (JNN).

Due to its connections with flagship TBS, RSK joined JRN as one of its first members of the network on May 2, 1965, making Sanyo Hōsō a JRN-only station, serving on the Okayama part of the market. In October 1997, after years of being a single JRN affiliate, RSK joined NRN, becoming the last radio station to join the network, expanding its programming with All Night Nippon and NPB games. RNC, initially an NRN-only affiliate, joining JRN on the same year, serving only the Kagawa part of the market, making RSK Radio the default JRN-NRN station for the entire Okayama prefecture.

== History ==
In 1952, against the background of an upsurge in applications for the establishment of private broadcasting across Japan, there was also a movement in the political and financial circles of Okayama Prefecture to request the establishment of private broadcasting. On November 1 of the same year, Sanyo Shimbun, Okayama Prefectural Government, Okayama City Government, and Tenmanya held the first founders' meeting of Radio Sanyo (ラジジオ山陽), and submitted an application for the establishment of private broadcasting to the Ministry of Post and Post on November 29, and began preparations for the establishment of Radio Sanyo. On April 1 of the following year, Radio Sanyo held the founding general meeting, and on May 1 of the same year, it began to renovate the Tenmanya Annex building as its headquarters.

At 10 a.m. on October 1, 1953, Radio Sanyo officially began broadcasting radio programs, becoming the 21st private radio station in Japan. In the first half year after its launch, Sanyo Radio recorded a loss of 3.8 million yen. However, starting from the first half of 1954, Radio Sanyo turned losses into profits, and its operating conditions began to improve. In 1954, Radio Sanyo achieved a profit of 1.53 million yen. In 1956, Radio Sanyo also implemented its first stock dividend and established a relay station in Tsuyama City, expanding its reach in the northern part of Okayama Prefecture. In 1955, Sanyo Radio built the first employee residence in Japan's private broadcasting industry.

Radio Sanyo applied for a television license on October 27, 1953, less than a month after the start of broadcasting. In order to cover Kagawa Prefecture Radio Sanyo decided to build its main TV signal transmitting station in Mount Kinka. On June 1, 1958, Radio Sanyo officially began broadcasting TV programs, becoming the seventh private television station in Japan. At the time of its launch, Radio Sanyo broadcast an average of less than 6 hours of television programs every day, 50% of which came from Radio Tokyo, 20% from Nippon Television, 10% from Osaka Television, and the other 20% were produced in-house. However, with the launch of Nishinippon Broadcasting's television division, Radio Sanyo began to stop broadcasting NTV programs in October of the same year. In 1959, Radio Sanyo's television department joined the Japan News Network.

As the office space became increasingly smaller due to the increase in business, Radio Sanyo decided to start building a broadcast hall in advance in 1960. In June 1961, Radio Sanyo began to build its new headquarters. In the same year, in order to reflect the current situation that television replaced radio as its main business, Radio Sanyo changed its company name to Sanyo Broadcasting on September 1. Starting from March of the following year, all departments of Sanyo Broadcasting moved into the Broadcasting Hall one after another, and began to work entirely in the Broadcasting Hall from May 1st. In October 1963, Sanyo Broadcasting achieved a single-month turnover of more than 1 billion yen for the first time. The following year, Sanyo Broadcasting opened a branch in Takamatsu City to strengthen its business in Shikoku. In 1981, Sanyo Broadcasting's Takamatsu Branch was renamed Shikoku Branch.

In 1966, Sanyo Broadcasting began airing color TV programs. Two years later, Sanyo Broadcasting realized the colorization of its own local news. In 1973, the 20th anniversary of the broadcast, Sanyo Broadcasting introduced a corporate identification system and launched the second-generation trademark (also the current trademark). In the same year, Sanyo Broadcasting opened its first overseas branch, the Beirut branch (it moved to Cairo in 1976 due to the deterioration of the situation in Lebanon). In 1979, Sanyo Broadcasting expanded its headquarters.

In 1980, Sanyo Broadcasting began broadcasting stereo TV programs, becoming the first TV station in the Okayama and Kagawa area to broadcast stereo programs. When the Seto Ohashi Bridge was opened to traffic in 1988, Sanyo Broadcasting assisted the JNN network stations in jointly producing news special programs, and opened a satellite studio at the Seto Ohashi Expo to provide the latest information about the expo. The following year, Sanyo Broadcasting opened a new news studio and introduced the Satellite News Broadcasting (SNG) system. During the 1991 Persian Gulf War, since Sanyo Broadcasting established the Cairo branch to be responsible for news in the Middle East and was included in JNN's coverage of the Persian Gulf War, playing an important role. In 1999, Sanyo Broadcasting was recognized by the National Liberation Federation of China with the Grand Prize for its continuous reporting on industrial waste in Toshima, Kagawa Prefecture. In 2001, Sanyo Broadcasting produced a high-definition TV program for the first time.

On December 1, 2006, Sanyo Broadcasting began to broadcast digital TV signals, and stopped broadcasting analog TV signals on July 24, 2011. In 2012, RSK closed its Cairo branch.

In 2017, Sanyo Broadcasting purchased the land of Korakukan Middle School from Okayama City for the construction of a new headquarters. On July 22, 2020, the new headquarters of RSK Sanyo Broadcasting was completed. The building has 5 floors above ground and 1 floor underground, with a total floor area of 11,421 square meters. There is also a concert hall on the first floor. The relief sculpture "Leap Forward" by artist Taro Okamoto has also been moved to the new headquarters. RSK was expected to open its new headquarters in 2021. In May 2018, Sanyo Broadcasting announced its plan to establish a broadcast holding company. On April 1, 2019, after completing the legal procedures and obtaining approval from the Minister of Internal Affairs and Communications, Sanyo Broadcasting rebranded to RSK Holdings, and the radio and television business was inherited by the newly established RSK Sanyo Broadcasting. RSK Sanyo Broadcasting thus became the 10th broadcasting holding company in Japan and the first broadcasting holding company outside the main five regions (Tokyo, Nagoya, Osaka, Fukuoka, and Hokkaido).

== Supplement ==
- Though the number of employees is a few, this broadcasting station has the first NETA in the whole country, and is putting in power to NETA of national advance.
  - It applied for license of the first FM broadcast in commercial broadcasting at the time of the end of the 1950s. (It became license withdrawal 1970)
  - The local evening news program "the San-yo TV evening news" in the evening was started on RSK television in 1971. (the first in the measure of composing a local news in the evening, and the whole country)
  - 1980, according to the inside of area, the frequency of RSK radio is unified into 1494 kHz, and will become the same frequency broadcast. (the first in the example of the same frequency broadcast in area of a radio station, and the whole country)
  - The Okayama office and the Takahashi office of RSK radio changed to a stereophonic broadcast from monophonic broadcast in October, 1992 (the first stereophonic broadcast in a relay station of a radio station, the key station and several relay stations] in the whole country)
- Since the affiliation network of RSK radio was only JRN till the autumn of 1997, the network of NRN was the form which the RNC radio (Nishinippon Broadcasting Corporation) of on-the-opposite-shore Kagawa covers.
  - However, the judgment considered to be disadvantageous for business as being related with this was struck by the organization after 1:00 at midnight on a weekday and Saturday of those days. Therefore, in the autumn of 1997, the network of the JRN program of the midnight of a weekday was closed and frame movement was carried out on Sunday etc. for broadcast of the all genre program of the midnight on Saturday. And "all night NIPPON" resulted in the broadcast start of the 35th game.
- RSK radio was broadcasting slightly some programs of JFN(s), such as "Masaharu Fukuyama's SUZUKI Talking FM", until FM Okayama of JFN affiliation was opened in April, 1999.

== Item ==
- Sanyo News Paper
