= My Boy in Blue =

Japanese manga series

- The cover of the first volume of My Boy in Blue

PとJK (P to JK)
- Genre: Romantic comedy
- Manga
- Written by: Maki Miyoshi
- Published by: Kodansha
- English publisher: NA: Kodansha USA
- Magazine: Bessatsu Friend
- Original run: December 13, 2012 – February 13, 2020
- Volumes: 16
- Live-action film
- Directed by: Ryūichi Hiroki
- Written by: Nami Kikkawa
- Studio: Shochiku
- Released: March 25, 2017

My Boy in Blue (PとJK, Pi to Jeikei; lit. "Policeman and Schoolgirl") is a Japanese romantic comedy shōjo manga series by Maki Miyoshi and serialized by Kodansha in Bessatsu Friend. The Japanese title is composed of acronyms for Police Officer and Joshi Kōsei, "high school girl". The first volume was published on April 12, 2013. A live-action film adaptation was announced in May 2016 with Ryūichi Hiroki as director, and premiered on March 25, 2017. The manga won the 41st Annual Kodansha Manga Award in the "Shojo" category in 2017. The manga ended in February 2020 with a total of sixteen volumes.

== Plot ==
The story revolves around Kako Motoya, a first-year high school student, and Kota Sagano, a police man. The two meet at a mixer and begin to fall for each other until Kota realizes Kako is a high schooler. Nonetheless, the two marry in secret; the story follows their bizarre marriage and the troubles that occur.

== Characters ==
Kako Motoya
Portrayed by: Tao Tsuchiya
Kota Sagano
Portrayed by: Kazuya Kamenashi
Heisuke Ōkami
Portrayed by: Mahiro Takasugi
Mikado Yaguchi
Portrayed by:Tina Tamashiro
Jiro Nagakura
Portrayed by: Daigo Nishihata
Fumi Komori
Portrayed by: Aya Ōmasa
Yamamoto
Portrayed by: Tomorowo Taguchi
Kako's father
Portrayed by: Jun Murakami
Kako's mother
Portrayed by: Rie Tomosaka

== Reception ==
It was number fourteen in the Nationwide Bookstore Employees' Recommended Comics of 2014.

Volume 3 reached the 25th place of the weekly Oricon manga charts and, as of December 22, 2013, has sold 69,261 copies. Volume 4 reached the 12th place and, as of April 20, 2014, has sold 112,796 copies. Volume 5 reached the 5th place and, as of August 17, 2014, has sold 104,905 copies. As of May 2016, the series has sold 2.1 million copies.
