= Flower and Sword =

- Film poster
- Directed by: Tetsuo Shinohara
- Screenplay by: Yoshiko Morishita
- Based on: Hana Ikusa by Tadashi Onitsuka
- Produced by: Shōhei Kotaki
- Starring: Mansai Nomura; Ichikawa En'nosuke IV; Kiichi Nakai; Kuranosuke Sasaki; Kōichi Satō
- Cinematography: Tokushō Kikumura
- Edited by: Hirohide Abe
- Music by: Joe Hisaishi
- Distributed by: Toei
- Release date: June 3, 2017 (Japan)
- Running time: 127 minutes
- Country: Japan
- Language: Japanese

Flower and Sword (Japanese: 花戦さ, Hepburn: Hana Ikusa) is a 2017 Japanese film about kadō, the Japanese art of flower arrangement, directed by Tetsuo Shinohara.

== Cast ==
- Mansai Nomura as Ikenobō Senkō
- Ichikawa En'nosuke IV as Toyotomi Hideyoshi
- Kōichi Satō as Sen no Rikyū
- Kiichi Nakai as Oda Nobunaga
- Kuranosuke Sasaki as Maeda Toshiie
- Katsumi Takahashi
- Takaya Yamauchi
- Masato Wada
- Aoi Morikawa as Ren
- Eisaku Yoshida as Ishida Mitsunari
- Keiko Takeshita as Jōchin'ni

== Awards ==
Award	Category	Nominee	Result
41st Japan Academy Prize	Picture of the Year	Flower and Sword	Nominated
41st Japan Academy Prize	Director of the Year	Tetsuo Shinohara	Nominated
41st Japan Academy Prize	Screenplay of the Year	Yoshiko Morishita	Nominated
41st Japan Academy Prize	Best Cinematography	Tokushō Kikumura	Nominated
41st Japan Academy Prize	Best Lighting Direction	Tatsuya Osada	Nominated
41st Japan Academy Prize	Best Art Direction	Tomoko Kurata	Won
41st Japan Academy Prize	Best Sound Recording	Satoshi Ozaki	Nominated
41st Japan Academy Prize	Best Film Editing	Hirohide Abe	Nominated
