= Ryota Katayose =

Japanese singer and actor (born 1994)

- 片寄涼太
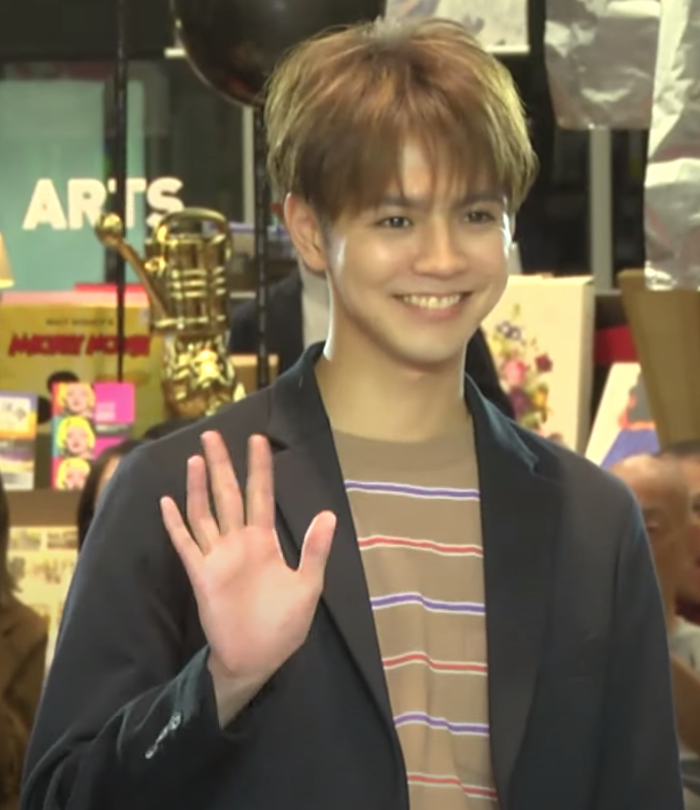
- Katayose in Taiwan in 2019
- Born: 29 August 1994 (age 32); Yao, Osaka, Japan
- Occupations: Singer; actor
- Years active: 2011–present
- Height: 181 cm (5 ft 11 in)
- Spouse: Tao Tsuchiya (m. 2023)
- Children: 1
- Relatives: Shimba Tsuchiya (brother-in-law)
- Musical career
- Genres: J-pop; dance
- Instruments: Vocal; piano
- Labels: LDH; Rhythm Zone
- Website: LDH profile

Ryota Katayose (片寄 涼太, Katayose Ryōta; born 29 August 1994) is a Japanese singer and actor. He is a vocalist of Generations from Exile Tribe and is represented by LDH.

== Early life and career ==
Katayose is the only child. He learned to play piano from his grandfather and father. He was a keen football player in his youth. He joined the National Training Center to join the team. In February 2010, Katayose participated in the Vocal Audition 2: Yume o Motta Wakamono-tachi e, becoming a finalist. He then joined Osaka's EXPG (Exile Professional Gym) on a scholarship. On 19 July 2011, Katayose became a candidate for Generations and an official member on 17 April 2012. On 21 November 2011, they made a major debut with the single "Brave It Out". He made his acting debut in the drama GTO. Katayose starred in a leading role for the films, My Brother Loves Me Too Much and Ride Your Wave.

=== Personal life ===
On January 1, 2023, Katayose married actress Tao Tsuchiya, and announced that they are expecting their first child together. On August 29, 2023, Tsuchiya and Katayose announced the birth of their first child.

== Discography ==
=== Lyrics ===
Year	Title	Artist	Album
2015	"Story"	Generations from Exile Tribe	Generation Ex
2017	"Pray"	Generations from Exile Tribe	Namida o Nagasenai Pierrot wa Taiyō mo Tsuki mo Nai Sora o Miageta

=== Participating works ===
Year	Title	Artist	Ref.
2018	"Psychic Magic"	M-Flo presents Prince Project feat. Ryota Katayose	

=== Digital singles ===
Year	Title	Ref.
2020	"Possible"	

== Filmography ==
=== Television ===
Year	Title	Role	Network	Notes	Ref(s).
2014	Great Teacher Onizuka	Masaru Kiritani	KTV		
2017	My Brother Loves Me Too Much	Haruka Tachibana	NTV	Co-starring with Tao Tsuchiya	
2018	Prince of Legend	Kanade Suzaku	NTV	Lead role	
2019	Mr. Hiiragi's Homeroom	Kai Hayato	NTV		
2019	Nippon Noir	Kai Hayato	NTV	Episode 6	
2020	Prayers in the Emergency Room	Reiichi Tanaka	TBS		
2021	Radiation House 2	Takeshi Muto	Fuji TV	Episode 6	
2022	Unmei Keisatsu	"Seven" / Nanase Fukuyama	TV Tokyo	Lead role	
2023	Born to Be on Air!	Chūya Nakahara	TV Asahi		

=== Web dramas ===
Year	Title	Role	Network	Notes	Ref.
2019	Tokyo Coin Laundry	Yuto Kurashima	GyaO!	Lead role	

=== Film ===
Year	Title	Role	Notes	Ref.
2017	My Brother Loves Me Too Much	Haruka Tachibana	Lead role	
2019	Prince of Legend	Kanade Suzaku	Lead role	
2019	Ride Your Wave	Minato Hinageshi (voice)	Lead role	
2019	Kiss Me at the Stroke of Midnight	Kaede Ayase	Lead role	
2020	Kizoku Kourin -Prince of Legend	Kanade Suzaku		
2020	Threads: Our Tapestry of Love	Sasaki		
2023	Sana	Himself	Lead role	

=== Game ===
Year	Title	Role	Notes
2019	Prince Of Legend Love Royale	Kanade Suzaku	Available on iOS / Android

=== Advertisements ===
==== CM ====
Year	Title	Ref.
2015	Moist Diane "Extra Shine"	
2015	Samantha Thavasa "Samantha Vega"	
2017	Tokyo Nishikawa "Afit"	
2017	Recruit Jobs "Town work"	
2019	Tokyo Nishikawa "Afit" (Season movie "Spring & Summer")	
2019	Zoff "Zoff SMART meets 0kiss"	
2023	Tomodachiga Yatteru Cafe	

==== Other ====
Year	Title	Role	Ref.
2017	Gentosha Bunko	Fair Character	

=== Live ===
Year	Title	Ref.
2014	Vocal Battle Audition Presents: Vocal Battle Stage 2014	

== Awards ==
Year	Organisation	Award	Work	Result
2018	WEIBO Account Festival in Japan 2018	Popular Artist Award	—	Won
2019	4th International Film Festival and Awards Macao	Asian Stars: Up Next Award	—	Won

== Photobook ==
	Release date	Title	Ref.
1st	7 August 2018	Goodbye.White (グッバイ、ホワイト)	
