= Hiroyuki Hirayama =

Japanese actor (born 1977)

- Born: 17 October 1977 (age 48); Mizuho, Gifu, Japan
- Occupation: Actor
- Years active: 2003–present

Hiroyuki Hirayama (平山浩行, Hirayama Hiroyuki; born 17 October 1977) is a Japanese actor. He appeared in more than 40 films since 2003.

== Selected filmography ==
=== Film ===
Year	Title	Role	Notes	Ref.
2005	Yamato			
2006	Retribution			
2011	Paradise Kiss			
2012	Brave Hearts: Umizaru			
2015	S The Last Policeman - Recovery of Our Future			
2017	Honnō-ji Hotel	Yoshioka		
2019	Haruka no Sue			
2025	Kaiju Guy!			

=== Television ===
Year	Title	Role	Notes	Ref.
2008	Atsuhime	Kaieda Nobuyoshi	Taiga drama	
2011	Full Throttle Girl	Kyoichi Shindo		
2020	Kamen Rider Saber	Daichi Kamijo/Previous Saber/Calibur		
