= Tao Tsuchiya =

Japanese actress and model (born 1995)

- 土屋 太鳳
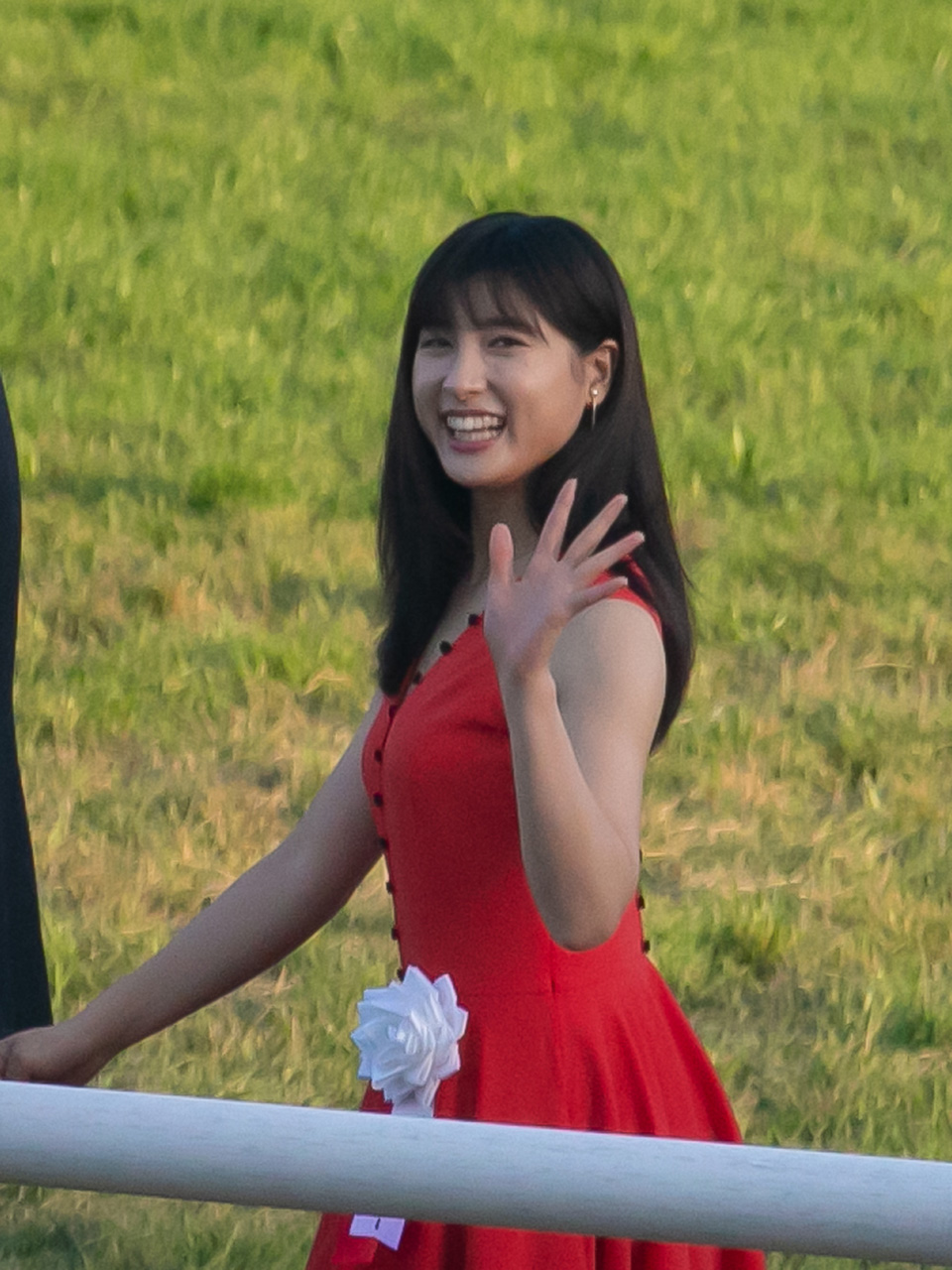
- Tsuchiya at the 43rd Queen Elizabeth II Cup, 2018
- Born: February 3, 1995 (age 31); Tokyo, Japan
- Occupation: Actress
- Years active: 2005–present
- Agent: Sony Music Artists
- Known for: Rurouni Kenshin: Kyoto Inferno; Mare; Alice in Borderland
- Spouse: Ryota Katayose (m. 2023)
- Children: 1
- Relatives: Honoka Tsuchiya (sister); Shimba Tsuchiya (brother)
- Musical career
- Genre: J-pop
- Instrument: Vocals
- Label: Sony Music Records
- Member of: Taotak

Tao Tsuchiya (土屋太鳳, Tsuchiya Tao; born February 3, 1995) is a Japanese actress. She is best known for her memorable role of Makimachi Misao in the movie series Rurouni Kenshin, as Mai Nakahara in The 8-Year Engagement, Koharu in The Cinderella Addiction and most recently as Yuzuha Usagi in Netflix's Alice in Borderland. Her older sister, Honoka, works as a model, while her younger brother, Shimba Tsuchiya, is also an actor.

== Career and stage play ==
Chosen from among 2,020 women auditioning for the part, Tsuchiya was cast in the starring role of Mare, a morning drama serial aired on Japan's public television which first aired on March 30, 2015.

In 2018, Tsuchiya performed in a theatre production in five cities within four countries around the world. The production was an adaptation from the manga Pluto. She played two main characters: a little cyborg girl named Uran and a cyborg woman named Helena.

She was that Japanese voice of Félicie in the 2016 film Ballerina and sung a new ending theme titled "Félicies" in the Japanese dub.

She planned to participate in another Stage Play challenge in Tokyo during the summer of 2020, joining a Madam Mari Natsuki production called Neo Vol. 4.

== Personal life ==
On January 1, 2023, Tsuchiya announced on her Instagram that she had married the Generations from Exile Tribe singer and actor Ryota Katayose, who was her co-star in the 2017 film My Brother Loves Me Too Much. At the same time, she also announced her pregnancy with her first child. On August 29, 2023, Tsuchiya and Katayose announced the birth of their first child.

== Filmography ==
=== Film ===
Year	Title	Role	Notes	Ref.
2008	Tokyo Sonata	Mika Kurosu		
2009	Tsurikichi Sanpei	Yuri Takayama		
2010	Ultraman Zero: The Revenge of Belial	Princess Emerana Luludo Esmeralda		
2011	The Legacy of the Sun	Sū-chan		
2012	Hatenu Mura no Mina	Kanna Matsushita	Lead role	
2013	Arcana	Maki / Satsuki	Lead role	
2013	Suzuki Sensei: The Movie	Somi Ogawa		
2013	Sekiseki Renren	Juri	Lead role	
2014	Rurouni Kenshin: Kyoto Inferno	Makimachi Misao		
2014	Rurouni Kenshin: The Legend Ends	Makimachi Misao		
2014	The Werewolf Game: The Beast Side	Yuka Kabayama	Lead role	
2015	Orange	Naho Takamiya	Lead role	
2015	Library Wars: The Last Mission	Marie Nakazawa		
2016	Gold Medal Man	Midori Yokoi		
2016	Yell for the Blue Sky	Tsubasa Ono	Lead role	
2017	Policeman and Me	Kako Motoya	Lead role	
2017	Tori Girl	Yukina Toriyama	Lead role	
2017	My Brother Loves Me Too Much	Setoka Tachibana	Lead role	
2017	The 8-Year Engagement	Mai Nakahara	Lead role	
2018	My Little Monster	Shizuku Mizutani	Lead role	
2018	Kasane: Beauty and Fate	Nina Tanzawa and Kasane	Lead role	
2018	Waiting for Spring	Mitsuki Haruno	Lead role	
2019	Whistleblower	Nanako Misawa		
2020	Food Luck	Shizuka Takenaka	Lead role	
2021	Jump!! The Heroes Behind the Gold	Yukie Nishikata		
2021	The Cinderella Addiction	Koharu Fukuura	Lead role	
2021	Rurouni Kenshin: The Final	Makimachi Misao		
2021	Every Trick in the Book	Nahomi Torikai		
2022	What to Do with the Dead Kaiju?	Yukino Amane		
2023	As Long as We Both Shall Live	Sumi	Special appearance	
2024	Matched	Rinka	Lead role	
2024	Dangerous Cops: Home Coming	Ayaka Nagamine		
2024	Honeko Akabane's Bodyguards	Masachika Jingū		
2024	Hakkenden: Fiction and Reality	Princess Fuse		
2025	The Final Piece	Natsuko		
2026	Matched: True Love	Rinka	Lead role	
2026	Sukiyaki	Yukiko Kashiwagi		

=== Television ===
Year	Title	Role	Notes	Ref.
2010	Ryōmaden	Otome Sakamoto (as a teenager)	Episode 1; Taiga drama	
2011	Ohisama	Hana Kimura	Asadora	
2011	Ouran High School Host Club	Renge Houshakuji		
2011	Suzuki Sensei	Somi Ogawa		
2012	Ultraman Retsuden	Princess Emerana Luludo Esmeralda		
2012	Chūshingura: Sono Gi Sono Ai	Yae Isaka	TV movie	
2012	Miss Double Faced Teacher	Shiori Matsumoto		
2013	Limit	Chieko Kamiya		
2013	Mayonaka no Panya-san	Nozomi Shinozaki		
2014	Konya wa Kokoro Dake Daite	Miu Masaoka	Lead role	
2014	Hanako and Anne	Momo Ando	Asadora	
2015	Mare	Mare Tsumura	Lead role; Asadora	
2015	Library Wars: Book of Memories	Marie Nakazawa	TV movie	
2015–18	Downtown Rocket	Rina Tsukuda	2 seasons	
2016	Whose Is the Cuckoo's Egg?	Kazami Hida	Lead role	
2016	Goodbye Ghosts!	Sachi Aguma	Lead role	
2016	IQ246: The Cases of a Royal Genius	Sōko Watō		
2018	We Are Rockets!	Wakaba Fujitani	Lead role	
2019	Castle of Sand	Rieko Naruse	TV movie	
2019	Dream Stage	Tsubasa Ozawa	Lead role; TV movie	
2019	W's Tragedy	Mako Watsuji	Lead role; TV movie	
2020	Bones of Steel	Moe Nomura		
2020–2025	Alice in Borderland	Yuzuha Usagi	Lead role; 3 seasons	
2022	Involvement in Family Affairs	Sato Shinohara	Lead role	
2024	Shrink: Psychiatrist Yowai	Yuri Amemiya	Miniseries	
2024	The Diamond Sleeping Under the Sea	Yuriko		

=== Voice acting ===
Year	Title	Role	Notes	Ref.
2016	Erased	Satoru Fujinuma (young)	TV anime	
2016	Ballerina	Félicie	Japanese dubbing	
2018	Bumblebee	Charlie Watson (Hailee Steinfeld)	Live-action Japanese dubbing	
2021	Sing a Bit of Harmony	Shion Ashimori	Anime film	
2026	Anpanman: Pantan to Yakusoku no Hoshi	Pantan	Anime film	

=== Music video appearances ===
- Greeeen – Dream (2016)
- Lang Lang – Classical Music Mashup (2019)
- Taiking ft. Tsuchiya Tao - Rules (2022)

=== Others ===
- 60th Japan Record Awards (2018), host
- 61st Japan Record Awards (2019), host

== Discography ==
=== Singles ===
- "Fēlicies" (2017)
- "Anniversary" (2018) released as Taotak (duo with Takumi Kitamura)
- " Lead Your Partner " (2021)
- "Umbrella" (2021)
- "You Got Friends" (2021)
- "Rules" (2022) (featuring with Taiking of Suchmos )

== Print publications ==
=== Magazines ===
- Hanachu, Shufunotomo 2003-, as an exclusive model from May 2008 to June 2010

=== Photobooks ===
- Tsubomi 1 (13 October 2011, Magazine House) ISBN 9784838723492
- Document (3 February 2015, Tokyo News Service) ISBN 9784863364561
- Marezora (16 September 2015, NHK Publishing) ISBN 9784140553473

== Awards and nominations ==
Year	Award ceremony	Category	Nominee / Work	Result	Ref.
2005	Miss Phoenix Super Heroine Audition	Special Jury Award	Tao Tsuchiya	Won	
2015	3rd Japan Action Awards	Best Action Actress	Rurouni Kenshin: Kyoto Inferno, Rurouni Kenshin: The Legend Ends	Won	
2015	28th Shogakukan DIME Trend Awards	Person of the Year Award	Mare	Won	
2016	40th Elan d'or Awards	Newcomer of the Year	Mare, Orange	Won	
2016	39th Japan Academy Film Prize	Newcomer of the Year	Orange	Won	
2017	30th Japan Best Dressed Eyes Awards	Entertainment Category – Female	Tao Tsuchiya	Won	
2017	15th Clarino Beautiful Legs Awards	20s Category	Tao Tsuchiya	Won	
2017	9th Tama Film Awards	Best Rising Actress	My Brother Loves Me Too Much, Policeman and Me, Tori Girl	Won	
2017	1st Pen Creator Awards	Actress	My Brother Loves Me Too Much, Policeman and Me, Tori Girl	Won	
2018	41st Japan Academy Film Prize	Best Actress	The 8-Year Engagement	Nominated	
2018	31st Nikkan Sports Film Awards	Best Actress	Kasane: Beauty and Fate, The 8-Year Engagement	Nominated	
2019	29th Japan Jewelry Fair	7th Woman of the Year	Tao Tsuchiya	Won	
2021	3rd Asia Contents Awards	Best Actress	Alice in Borderland	Nominated	
2025	48th Japan Academy Film Prize	Best Supporting Actress	Hakkenden: Fiction and Reality	Nominated	
