= Nishinippon Broadcasting =

Radio and television broadcaster in Takamatsu, Japan

Nishinippon Broadcasting Co., Ltd.
- Logo used since 1985

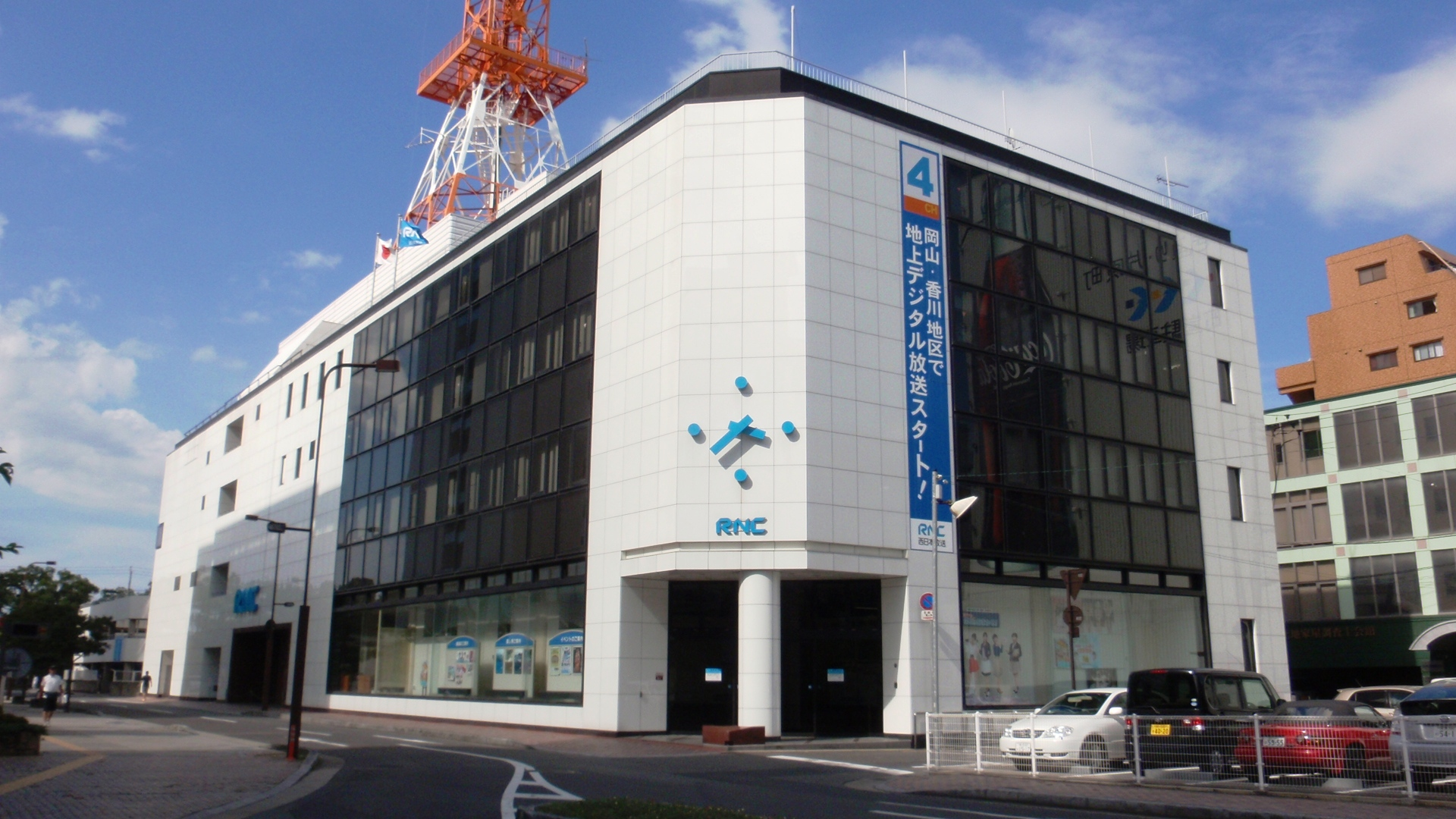
- Headquarters in Marunochi, Takamatsu
- Trade name: RNC
- Native name: 西日本放送株式会社
- Romanized name: Nishinipponhōsō kabushikigaisha
- Formerly: Radio Shikoku Co., Ltd. (1953); Radio Kagawa Co., Ltd. (1953-1956)
- Type: Kabushiki gaisha
- Industry: Television & Radio broadcasting
- Founded: July 29, 1953; 73 years ago
- Headquarters: 8-15 Marunouchi, Takamatsu City, Kagawa Prefecture, Japan
- Website: www.rnc.co.jp

JOKF
- Takamatsu; Japan
- Broadcast area: Kagawa Prefecture
- Frequencies: 1449 kHz (AM); 90.3 MHz (FM)
- Branding: RNC Radio; Nishinippon Hōsō Radio

Programming
- Language: Japanese
- Format: Talk/Sports
- Affiliations: JRN/NRN

Ownership
- Owner: Nishinippon Broadcasting Co., Ltd.

History
- First air date: October 1, 1953

Technical information
- Licensing authority: MIC
- Power: 5,000 watts
- Transmitter coordinates: 34°19′15″N 134°4′21.75″E

Links
- Website: www.rnc.co.jp/radio

JOKF-DTV
- Kagawa and Okayama; Japan
- City: Takamatsu
- Channels: Digital: 20 (UHF); Virtual: 4
- Branding: RNC; Nishinippon Hōsō TV

Programming
- Affiliations: Nippon News Network and Nippon Television Network System

Ownership
- Owner: Nishinippon Broadcasting Co., Ltd.

History
- First air date: July 1, 1958
- Former call signs: JOKF-TV (1958–2011)
- Former channel numbers: Analog: 9 (VHF, 1958–2011)

Technical information
- Licensing authority: MIC
- ERP: 2 kW (digital); 10kW (analog)
- Transmitter coordinates: 34°33′32.8″N 133°57′54.23″E

Links
- Website: www.rnc.co.jp/tv/

Nishinippon Broadcasting Co., Ltd. (西日本放送株式会社, Nishinippon Hōsō Kabushikigaisha) is a Japanese television and radio broadcaster in Kagawa and Okayama. The abbreviation, RNC originates in the radio service name (Radio Nishinippon Broadcasting Company, 西日本放送ラジオ). It is affiliated with Japan Radio Network (JRN), National Radio Network (NRN), Nippon News Network (NNN), and Nippon Television Network System (NNS).

RNC's radio division was initially an NRN-only station for the Okayama-Takamatsu market since they joined during radio network's creation in May 3, 1965. Years later, in October 1997, both RNC and cross-market rivals RSK Radio joined JRN and NRN respectively. Currently, RNC Radio serves as the default JRN-NRN affiliate in the entire prefecture.

== History ==
The company was founded as Radio Shikoku on July 29, 1953 by members of the Shikoku Shimbun Company and the prefecture's chamber of commerce and industry; regular broadcasts started on October 1, using the JOKF callsign on 1060kc, output 100W. On December 25, nearly three months after opening, it was renamed to Radio Kagawa. Taro Hirai was its first president, but was replaced by Jinnosuke Hirai on December 1, 1955. On October 1, 1956, it changed its name to the current Nishinippon Broadcasting, increasing its output to 1 kW. Its television broadcasts started on July 1, 1958, becoming the eighth commercial television station overall to begin broadcasting in Japan (JOKF-TV, channel 9, video output 1 kW, audio 250W). In October, it opened an office in Hiroshima and in November, in Imabari, later in 1959, two further offices opened in Himeji and Fukuyama.

On October 5, 1964, RNC started color broadcasts.
