= Honnōji Hotel =

2017 Japanese comedy mystery fantasy film by Masayuki Suzuki

- Poster
- Kanji: 本能寺ホテル
- Directed by: Masayuki Suzuki
- Screenplay by: Tomoko Aizawa
- Starring: Haruka Ayase; Shinichi Tsutsumi; Gaku Hamada; Hiroyuki Hirayama; Hiromasa Taguchi; Masahiro Takashima; Masaomi Kondō; Morio Kazama
- Distributed by: Toho
- Release date: 14 January 2017
- Running time: 120 minutes
- Country: Japan
- Language: Japanese
- Box office: US$1.8 million

Honnōji Hotel (本能寺ホテル) is a 2017 Japanese comedy mystery fantasy film directed by Masayuki Suzuki, written by Tomoko Aizawa and starring Haruka Ayase, Shinichi Tsutsumi, Gaku Hamada, Hiroyuki Hirayama, Hiromasa Taguchi, Masahiro Takashima, Masaomi Kondō and Morio Kazama. It was released in Japan by Toho on 14 January 2017.

== Plot ==
A woman visiting Kyoto finds that she has no reservation at the hotel where she intended to stay. She then finds a quaint, historic hotel, built near the site of the Honnō-ji incident, that happens to have a room available. On riding the elevator to her room she consumes a piece of konpeitō, and unexpectedly finds herself transported to the namesake temple in feudal Japan. Despite the perils of her unexplained presence, over several such trips she befriends the warlord Oda Nobunaga, who turns out to be a well-known but tragic historical figure.

== Cast ==
- Haruka Ayase as Mayuko Kuramoto
- Shinichi Tsutsumi as Oda Nobunaga
- Gaku Hamada as Mori Ranmaru
- Hiroyuki Hirayama
- Hiromasa Taguchi
- Masahiro Takashima as Akechi Mitsuhide
- Masaomi Kondō
- Morio Kazama
- Kiichi Nakai as Narrator

== Reception ==
The film was number-one in Japan on its opening weekend, with 167,000 admissions and US$1.8 million in gross.
