= Sanyo Shimbun =

Newspaper based in Okayama, Japan

- Front page of Sanyo Shimbun on September 28, 2026
- Type: Daily newspaper
- Format: Blanket (54.6 cm x 40.65 cm)
- Owner(s): The Sanyo Shimbun Co., Ltd
- Publisher: Takamasa Koshimune
- Founded: January 4, 1879
- Language: Japanese
- Headquarters: Okayama
- Circulation: 438,200 (morning edition)
- Website: www.sanyonews.jp

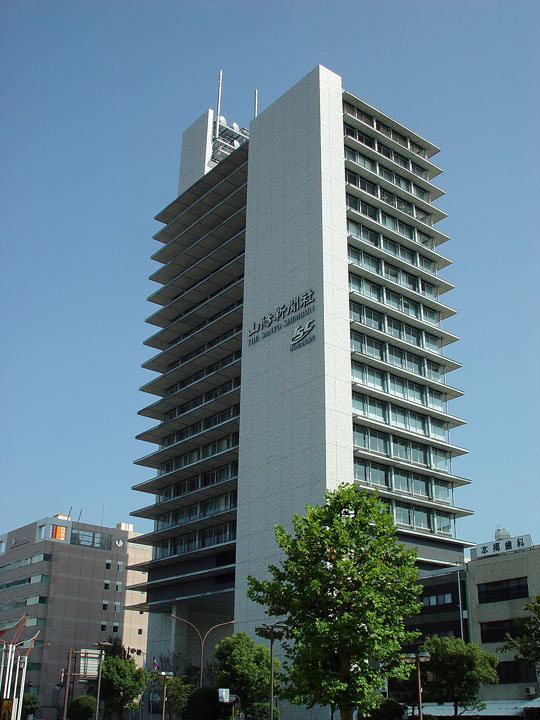
Headquarters of Sanyo Shimbun in Okayama

The Sanyo Shimbun (山陽新聞, San'yō Shinbun) is a Japanese language daily newspaper published by The Sanyo Shimbun Co., Ltd (株式会社山陽新聞社, Kabushiki-gaisha San'yō Shinbunsha). The company was founded on January 4, 1879.

The newspaper is based in Okayama, Japan. The newspaper covers national and international news stories and also news from Okayama and neighboring prefectures. It is distributed throughout Okayama prefecture, eastern Hiroshima, and parts of Kagawa. Stories can be read online, though most stories are only available to subscribers.

With The Nikkei, the newspaper owns shares in TV Setouchi.
