= Awaiting Kirin =

Taiga drama about samurai Akechi Mitsuhide

- Promotional poster
- Kirin ga Kuru
- Written by: Shunsaku Ikehata; Yōichi Maekawa
- Directed by: Taku Ōhara and others
- Starring: Hiroki Hasegawa; Shōta Sometani; Mugi Kadowaki; Takashi Okamura; Fumino Kimura; Masahiko Nishimura; Sayuri Ishikawa; Osamu Mukai; Haruna Kawaguchi; Hideaki Itō; Shunsuke Kazama; Yūsuke Santamaria; Kenichi Takitō; Machiko Ono; Kuranosuke Sasaki; Tsurutaro Kataoka; Kōtarō Yoshida; Takanori Jinnai; Katsunori Takahashi; Masaaki Sakai; Masahiro Motoki
- Narrated by: Ichikawa Ebizō XI
- Theme music composer: John R. Graham
- Opening theme: "Warrior Past" by the NHK Symphony Orchestra
- Composer: John R. Graham
- Country of origin: Japan
- Original language: Japanese
- No. of episodes: 44

Production
- Producers: Masaru Ochiai (chief); Hideki Fujinami; Ryōhei Nakano
- Running time: 45 minutes

Original release
- Network: NHK
- Release: January 19, 2020 – February 7, 2021

Awaiting Kirin (麒麟がくる; Kirin ga Kuru) is a 2020 Japanese historical drama television series starring Hiroki Hasegawa as Akechi Mitsuhide, a samurai and general during the Sengoku period. The series is the 59th NHK taiga drama, premiering on January 19, 2020. It is the first regular taiga drama to be fully shot in 4K resolution, (Note: Moribito: Guardian of the Spirit, a taiga fantasy drama from 2016 to 2018, was fully shot in 4K, but it is not counted as part of the official list of taiga dramas.) as well as the first taiga drama to be composed by a non-Japanese (John R. Graham).

== Plot ==
The story is based on the life of Akechi Mitsuhide, a general under Oda Nobunaga.

== Cast ==
=== Akechi clan ===
- Hiroki Hasegawa as Akechi "Jūbei" Mitsuhide
  - Hinata Igarashi as young Mitsuhide
- Fumino Kimura as Hiroko, Mitsuhide's wife
- Mana Ashida as Tama, Mitsuhide's third daughter
  - Saki Takenoya as young Tama (about 10 years old)
  - Kokone Shimizu as young Tama (about 5 years old)
- Nazuki Amano as Kishi, Mitsuhide's eldest daughter
  - Nanaka Hirao as young Kishi
- Sayuri Ishikawa as Maki, Mitsuhide's mother
- Masahiko Nishimura as Akechi Mitsuyasu, Mitsuhide's uncle
- Satoshi Tokushige as Fujita Dengo
- Shotaro Mamiya as Akechi Hidemitsu
- Shinji Ozeki as Akechi Mitsutsuna, Mitsuhide's father
- Takamasa Suga as Saitō Toshimitsu

=== Oda clan ===
- Shōta Sometani as Oda Nobunaga
- Katsunori Takahashi as Oda Nobuhide, Nobunaga's father
- Rei Dan as Dota Gozen, Nobunaga's mother
- Haruna Kawaguchi as Kichō, Saitō Dōsan's daughter, and the legal wife of Nobunaga
- Ryo Kimura as Oda Nobuyuki (Nobukatsu), Nobunaga's younger brother
- Yasuomi Sano as Oda Nobuhiro, Nobunaga's half-brother
- Houka Kinoshita as Oda Nobumitsu, Nobunaga's uncle
- Yoshiaki Umegaki as Oda "Hikogorō" Nobutomo
- Mizuki Inoue (HiHi Jets) as Oda Nobutada
  - Fūga Shibasaki as teen Nobutada (then known as Kimyōmaru)
  - Yahiro Katō as baby Nobutada (then known as Kimyōmaru)
- Ayaka Imoto as Oichi, Nobunaga's younger sister

The vassals

- Kuranosuke Sasaki as Hashiba Hideyoshi
- Kōtarō Yoshida as Matsunaga Hisahide
- Shōzō Uesugi as Hirate Masahide
- Masanobu Ando as Shibata Katsuie
- Jingi Irie as Maeda Toshiie
- Yūsuke Suga as Sassa Narimasa
- Kazuhiro Muroyama as Sakuma Morishige
- Nobuaki Kaneko as Sakuma Nobumori
- Tsubasa Imai as Mōri Shinsuke
- Tsutomu Ikeda as Hattori Koheita
- Kenshi Uchida as Yanada Masatsuna
- Yoshihiro Nozoe as Chūjō Ietada
- Takashi Hirota as Murai Sadakatsu
- Kenji Matsuda as Niwa Nagahide
- Yōhei Matsukado as Araki Murashige, Kishi's father-in-law
- Mizuki Itagaki as Mori Ranmaru
- Gaku Hamada as Kuroda Kanbei

=== Saitō clan ===
- Masahiro Motoki as Saitō Dōsan, the "Viper of Mino"
- Hideaki Itō as Saitō Yoshitatsu
- Jun Hasegawa as Saitō Magoshirō
- Naoki Inukai as Saitō Kiheiji
- Kaho Minami as Miyoshino, Dōsan's concubine
- Kyōko Kataoka as Omi no kata, Dōsan's legal wife
- Takehiro Murata as Inaba Yoshimichi (Inaba Ittetsu)
- Kōki Yamamoto as Hineno Hironari

=== Hosokawa clan ===
- Hidekazu Mashima as Hosokawa Fujitaka, Mitsuhide's best friend
- Shōsuke Tanihara as Mitsubuchi Fujihide
- Ayumu Mochizuki as Hosokawa Tadaoki, Tama's husband

=== Imagawa clan ===
- Kataoka Ainosuke VI as Imagawa Yoshimoto
- Goro Ibuki as Taigen Sessai
- Chikau Satō as Udono Nagateru
- Makiya Yamaguchi as Asahina Chikanori

=== Tokugawa (Matsudaira) clan ===
- Shunsuke Kazama as Tokugawa Ieyasu
  - Yūto Ikeda as Matsudaira Motonobu (Teen Ieyasu)
  - Ryusei Iwata as Takechiyo (Child Ieyasu)
- Yosuke Asari as Matsudaira Hirotada, Ieyasu's father
- Wakana Matsumoto as Odai no Kata, Ieyasu's mother
- Eiji Yokota as Mizuno Nobumoto, Ieyasu's uncle
- Kyōko Maya as Gen'ōni, a.k.a. Keyōin, Ieyasu's grandmother
- Yuriko Ono as Lady Tsukiyama, Ieyasu's wife
- Takashi Okamura as Kikumaru, a ninja

=== Toki clan ===
- Toshinori Omi as Toki Yorinari
- Masato Yano as Toki Yorizumi

=== Asakura clan ===
- Yūsuke Santamaria as Asakura Yoshikage
- Takaaki Enoki as Yamazaki Yoshiie
- Tōru Tezuka as Asakura Kageaki
- Yurito Mori as Kumagimimaru

=== Azai clan ===
- Hiroto Kanai as Azai Nagamasa

=== Ashikaga shogunate ===
- Kenichi Takitō as Ashikaga Yoshiaki, the 15th and final shōgun of the Ashikaga shogunate.
- Osamu Mukai as Ashikaga Yoshiteru, the 13th shōgun
- Hayate Ichinose as Ashikaga Yoshihide, the 14th shōgun
- Tomiyuki Kunihiro as Hosokawa Harumoto
- Tsurutaro Kataoka as Settsu Harukado
- Shuhei Uesugi as Isshiki Fujinaga

=== Miyoshi clan ===
- Kazuhiro Yamaji as Miyoshi Nagayoshi
- Hiroyasu Kurobe as Miyoshi Yoshitsugu
- Shōgo Miyahara as Miyoshi Nagayasu
- Hiroki Takano as Iwanari Tomomichi
- Kenji Oka as Miyoshi Sōi

=== Takeda clan ===
- Ryo Ishibashi as Takeda Shingen

=== The imperial court ===
- Bandō Tamasaburō V as Emperor Ōgimachi
  - Rui Sudō as Prince Michihito
- Seishiro Kato as Prince Sanehito
- Kanata Hongō as Konoe Sakihisa
- Kazutoyo Koyabu as Nijō Haruyoshi
- Renji Ishibashi as Sanjōnishi Sanezumi

=== Others ===
- Mugi Kadowaki as Koma
  - Noa Tanaka as young Koma
- Masaaki Sakai as Dr. Mochizuki Tōan
- Machiko Ono as Iroha-dayū
  - Yua Tanaka as young Iroha-dayū
- Takanori Jinnai as Imai Sōkyū
- Shunpūtei Koasa as Kakujo
- Taro Suruga as Tsutsui Junkei
- Yasukaze Motomiya as a bandit leader
- Reo Tamaoki as Iheiji
- Akio Ōtsuka as Sōjirō
- Bengal as Hōjin
- Takayuki Hamatsu as a seller of tea
- Manabu Hosoi as an old man
- Jiyū Arima as Shiba Yoshimune
- Shū Matsuda as Shiba Yoshikane
- Guin Poon Chaw as Naka, Hideyoshi's mother
- Kenichi Ogata as a monk
- Kozo Takeda as Kennyo
- Mansour Fakher as a missionary
- Shin'ichi Shirahata as Hatano Hideharu
- Mutsumi Sasaki as Nikkai

== Production ==
Production Credits

- Music – John R. Graham
- Titling – Suitō Nakatsuka
- Historical research – Tetsuo Owada
- Costume designer – Kazuko Kurosawa

On April 19, 2018, NHK announced Awaiting Kirin as its 59th taiga drama, starring Hiroki Hasegawa as Akechi Mitsuhide, a samurai and general during the Sengoku period, with Shunsaku Ikehata as writer. Ikehata previously wrote the 29th taiga drama, Taiheiki (1991). The drama aims to shed light on the first half of Akechi's life, of which little is known about due to lacking historical records. On March 8, 2019, NHK announced that John R. Graham will be Awaiting Kirin's composer, having previously been a composer for Kingsglaive: Final Fantasy XV; he is the first American hired to compose the score and the main theme of a taiga drama. Meanwhile, Junichi Hirokami acts as conductor of the NHK Symphony Orchestra. Historical researcher Tetsuo Owada, a professor emeritus at Shizuoka University who specializes in the Sengoku period of Japanese history, previously advised taiga dramas such as Hideyoshi (1996), Tenchijin (2009), and Gunshi Kanbei (2014).

=== Casting ===
After Hasegawa, the rest of the main cast was announced on March 8, 2019, which included Mugi Kadowaki, Takashi Okamura, Sayuri Ishikawa, Masahiko Nishimura, Katsunori Takahashi, Erika Sawajiri, and Masahiro Motoki among others. The second cast announcement on June 17, 2019, included Fumino Kimura as Hiroko, as well as Kaho Minami, Takehiro Murata, Satoshi Tokushige, Kataoka Ainosuke VI, Rei Dan, and Kuranosuke Sasaki. The third cast announcement on August 7, 2019, included Machiko Ono, Osamu Mukai, Shunsuke Kazama, and Goro Ibuki. Ono previously had the main roles in Ashio Kara Kita Onna (2014) and Natsume Soseki no Tsuma (2016), two NHK drama series written by Shunsaku Ikehata. The fourth cast announcement on February 19, 2020, included Yūsuke Santamaria, Shotaro Mamiya, Kanata Hongō, Masanobu Ando, Kyōko Maya, and Bengal.

=== Filming ===
The usual taiga drama production would first have one-third of the expected number of scripts finished before shooting begins. Afterwards, audience reception is taken into account as the rest of the series is written.

Shooting for the series began on June 3, 2019. Awaiting Kirin is the first regular taiga drama to be fully shot in 4K resolution. Chief producer Masaru Ochiai stated that the colorful costumes to be worn are made with adherence to feng shui.

On November 16, 2019, Erika Sawajiri, playing Oda Nobunaga's wife Kichō, was arrested over MDMA possession. She was replaced by Haruna Kawaguchi five days after being taken into custody. The series' start date was delayed by a fortnight as all of Sawajiri's scenes in the first 10 episodes – along with advertising and promotional footage – had to be reshot.

On April 1, 2020, NHK announced that filming schedules for both Awaiting Kirin and Yell were cancelled until April 12 to consider the safety of performers and staff during the COVID-19 pandemic. By April 7, NHK extended the cancellation of shooting for both series after Prime Minister Shinzo Abe proclaimed a one-month state of emergency for Tokyo and other prefectures. The series resumed on August 30, 2020.

== Reception ==
According to Kaori Shoji of The Japan Times, observers during the reshoots of the first 10 episodes criticized Haruna Kawaguchi's performance as being "too flimsy".

Ryusei Iwata's performance as Takechiyo, the child Ieyasu, has received praise from viewers online.

== TV schedule ==
Episode	Title	Directed by	Original airdate	Rating
1	"Mitsuhide, Nishi e" (光秀、西へ, Mitsuhide, to the West)	Taku Ōhara	January 19, 2020	19.1%
2	"Dōsan no Wana" (道三の罠, Dōsan's Snare)	Taku Ōhara	January 26, 2020	17.9%
3	"Mino no Kuni" (美濃の国, Mino Province)	Taku Ōhara	February 2, 2020	16.1%
4	"Owari Sennyū Shirei" (尾張潜入指令, Infiltration Order: Owari)	Hideki Fujinami	February 9, 2020	13.5%
5	"Iheiji wo Sagase" (伊平次を探せ, Find Iheiji!)	Hideki Fujinami	February 16, 2020	13.2%
6	"Miyoshi Nagayoshi Shūgeki Keikaku" (三好長慶襲撃計画, Miyoshi Nagayoshi's Battle Plan)	Taku Ōhara	February 23, 2020	13.8%
7	"Kichō no Negai" (帰蝶の願い, Kichō's Wish)	Takashi Isshiki	March 1, 2020	15.0%
8	"Dōmei no Yukue" (同盟のゆくえ, The Future of the Alliance)	Taku Ōhara	March 8, 2020	13.7%
9	"Nobunaga no Shippai" (信長の失敗, Nobunaga's Failure)	Yoshiharu Sasaki	March 15, 2020	15.0%
10	"Hitoribocchi no Wakagimi" (ひとりぼっちの若君, The Lonely Young Lord)	Takashi Isshiki	March 22, 2020	16.5%
11	"Shōgun no Namida" (将軍の涙, The Shogun's Tears)	Taku Ōhara	March 29, 2020	14.3%
12	"Jūbei no Yome" (十兵衛の嫁, Jūbei's Bride)	Yoshiharu Sasaki	April 5, 2020	14.6%
13	"Kichō no Hakarigoto" (帰蝶のはかりごと, Kichō's Scheme)	Takashi Fukagawa	April 12, 2020	15.7%
14	"Shōtoku-ji no Kaiken" (正徳寺の会見, The Audience at Shotokuji)	Taku Ōhara	April 19, 2020	15.4%
15	"Dōsan, Waga Chichi ni Arazu" (道三、わが父に非ず, Dōsan is not my father)	Takashi Isshiki	April 26, 2020	14.9%
16	"Ōkina Kuni" (大きな国, A Great Land)	Takashi Isshiki	May 3, 2020	16.2%
17	"Nagaragawa no Taiketsu" (長良川の対決, Showdown at Nagaragawa)	Taku Ōhara	May 10, 2020	14.9%
18	"Echizen e" (越前へ, To Echizen)	Yoshiharu Sasaki	May 17, 2020	15.1%
19	"Nobunaga wo Ansatsu seyo" (信長を暗殺せよ, Assassinate Nobunaga!)	Takashi Fukagawa	May 24, 2020	15.7%
20	"Ieyasu e no Fumi" (家康への文, The Letter to Ieyasu)	Takashi Isshiki	May 31, 2020	15.3%
21	"Kessen! Okehazama" (決戦！桶狭間, The Battle of Okehazama)	Takashi Isshiki	June 7, 2020	16.3%
The production was suspended for about three months due to the COVID-19 pandemic.
22	"Kyō yori no Shisha" (京よりの使者, The Messenger from Kyōto)	Taku Ōhara	August 30, 2020	14.6%
23	"Yoshiteru, Natsu no Owari ni" (義輝、夏の終わりに, The End of Yoshiteru's Summer)	Yoshiharu Sasaki	September 13, 2020	13.4%
24	"Shōgun no Utsuwa" (将軍の器, Fit to be Shogun)	Yoshiharu Sasaki	September 20, 2020	13.1%
25	"Hane Hakobu Ari" (羽運ぶ蟻, The Ant and the Wing)	Takashi Fukagawa	September 27, 2020	12.9%
26	"Mitsubuchi no Kankei" (三淵の奸計, Mitsubuchi's Scheme)	Takashi Fukagawa	October 4, 2020	13.0%
27	"Sōkyū no Yakusoku" (宗久の約束, Sokyu's Promise)	Takashi Isshiki	October 11, 2020	13.0%
28	"Atarashiki Bakufu" (新しき幕府, A New Shogunate)	Taku Ōhara	October 18, 2020	12.5%
29	"Settsu Harukado no Keiryaku" (摂津晴門の計略, Settsu Harukado's Plot)	Taku Ōhara	October 25, 2020	13.2%
30	"Asakura Yoshikage wo Ute" (朝倉義景を討て, Defeat Asakura Yoshikage)	Yoshiharu Sasaki	November 1, 2020	11.9%
31	"Nigeyo Nobunaga" (逃げよ信長, Run, Nobunaga)	Takashi Isshiki	November 8, 2020	13.8%
32	"Hangeki no Nihyakuchō" (反撃の二百挺, 200 Guns)	Takashi Fukagawa	November 15, 2020	13.3%
33	"Hieizan ni Sumu Mamono" (比叡山に棲む魔物, The Demons of Mount Hiei)	Takashi Isshiki	November 22, 2020	13.1%
34	"Yakiuchi no Daishō" (焼討ちの代償, The Price of the Massacre)	Yoshiharu Sasaki	November 29, 2020	13.6%
35	"Yoshiaki, Mayoi no Naka de" (義昭、まよいの中で, Yoshiaki Bewildered)	Taku Ōhara	December 6, 2020	12.7%
36	"Ketsubetsu" (訣別, Parting Ways)	Takashi Isshiki	December 13, 2020	12.3%
37	"Nobunaga-kō to Ranjatai" (信長公と蘭奢待, Nobunaga and the Ranjatai)	Takashi Fukagawa	December 20, 2020	12.2%
38	"Tanba Kōryaku Meirei" (丹波攻略命令, The Order to Conquer Tanba)	Hideki Fujinami	December 27, 2020	11.5%
39	"Hongan-ji wo Tatake" (本願寺を叩け, Crushing Honganji)	Takashi Fukagawa	January 3, 2021	11.4%
40	"Matsunaga Hisahide no Hiragumo" (松永久秀の平蜘蛛, Matsunaga Hisahide's Hiragumo)	Taku Ōhara	January 10, 2021	13.6%
41	"Tsuki ni Noboru Mono" (月にのぼる者, Reaching for the Moon)	Yoshiharu Sasaki	January 17, 2021	13.4%
42	"Hanare-yuku Kokoro" (離れゆく心, Fading Heart)	Takashi Isshiki	January 24, 2021	13.8%
43	"Yami ni Hikaru Ki" (闇に光る樹, A Tree that Shines In the Dark)	Takashi Isshiki	January 31, 2021	13.9%
44	"Honnō-ji no Hen" (本能寺の変, The Honnoji Incident)	Takashi Isshiki and Taku Ōhara	February 7, 2021	18.4%
Average rating 14.4% - Rating is based on Japanese Video Research (Kantō region).

=== Omnibus ===
Episode	Title	Original airdate	Original airtime
1	"Mino Chapter" (美濃編)	February 23, 2021	13:05 - 14:00
2	"Jōraku Chapter" (上洛編)	February 23, 2021	14:00 - 15:00
3	"Shin-Bakufu Chapter" (新幕府編)	February 23, 2021	15:05 - 16:20
4	"Honnō-ji Chapter" (本能寺編)	February 23, 2021	16:20 - 17:35

== Soundtrack ==
- Kirin ga Kuru NHK Taiga Drama Original Soundtrack Vol. 1 (January 29, 2020)
- Kirin ga Kuru NHK Taiga Drama Original Soundtrack Vol. 2
- Kirin ga Kuru NHK Taiga Drama Original Soundtrack Vol. 3 (December 23, 2020)

== Accolades ==
Ceremony	Category	Nominees	Result	Ref
24th Nikkan Sports Drama Grand Prix	Best Actor	Hiroki Hasegawa	Won	
24th Nikkan Sports Drama Grand Prix	Best Supporting Actor	Shōta Sometani	Won	

== See also ==
- Sengoku period
