= Yūki Yamato =

Japanese screenwriter and director

- 山戸 結希
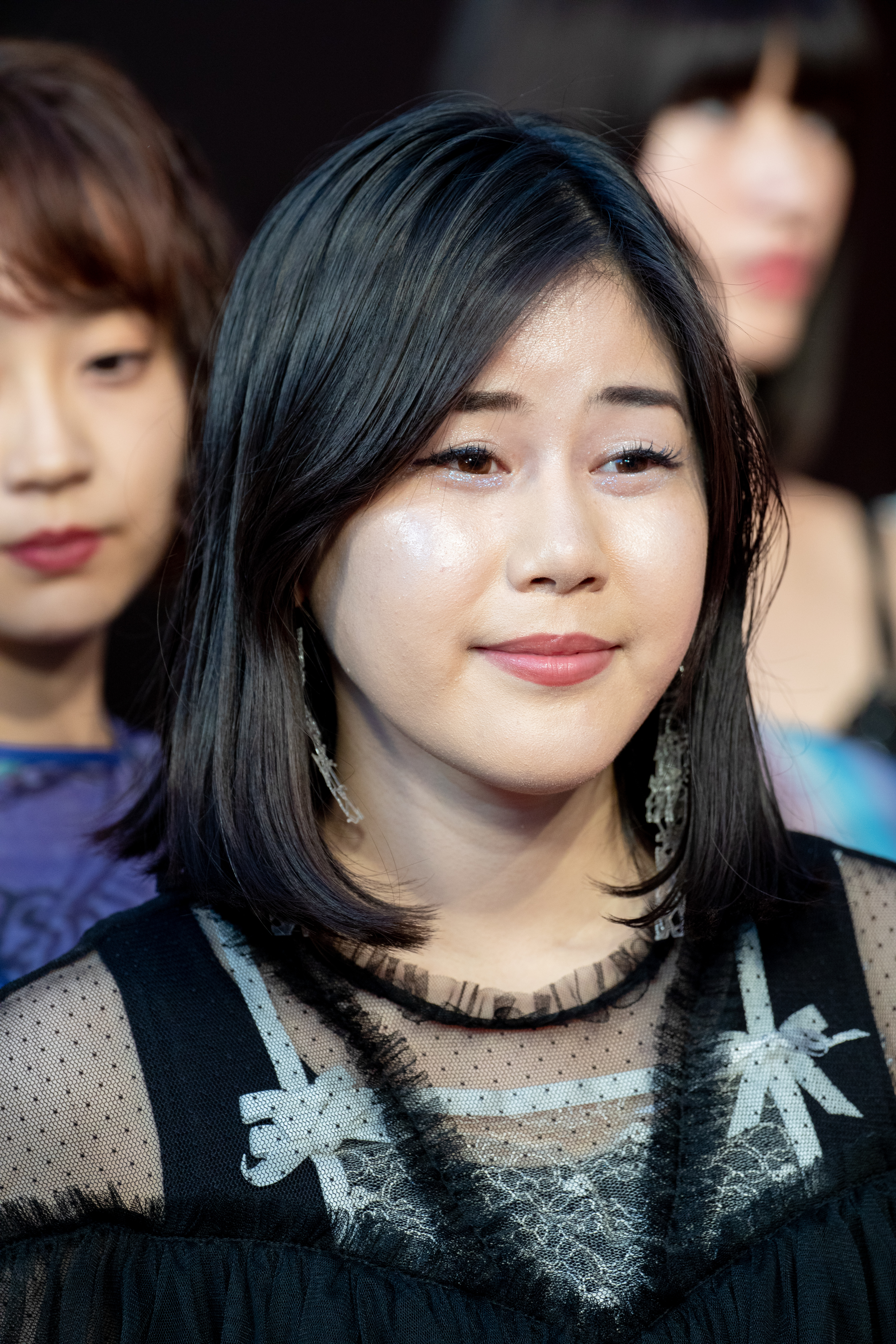
- Yamato in 2018
- Born: 1989 (age 36–37); Kariya, Aichi, Japan
- Occupations: Screenwriter; director
- Writing career
- Language: Japanese
- Notable works: Oboreru Knife; Hot Gimmick: Girl Meets Boy
- Notable awards: Japan Film Professional Award

Yūki Yamato (山戸 結希, Yamato Yūki) (born 1989) is a Japanese screenwriter and director. She has adapted and directed film versions of Hot Gimmick and Drowning Love, and was named Best New Director at the 24th Japan Film Professional Awards. She has also directed music videos for Nogizaka46, Momoiro Clover Z, and Radwimps.

== Early life and education ==
Yamato was born in 1989 in Kariya, Aichi. While studying philosophy at Sophia University, Yamato joined the school's film society and made her first film, titled That Girl is Dancing by the Seaside (あの娘が海辺で踊ってる), in 2012. The film, a story about one summer in the lives of two high school girls, won a Special Jury Prize at the Tokyo Student Film Festival.

== Career ==
Yamato wrote and directed her first major film, titled Count Five to Dream of You (5つ数えれば君の夢, Itsutsu Kazoereba Kimi no Yume) and starring the members of idol group Tokyo Girls' Style as students in a girls' high school preparing for a cultural festival, in 2014. For her work on the film, Yamato was named Best New Director at the 24th Japan Film Professional Awards.

Yamato continued her involvement with musical groups by directing music videos for Nogizaka46 member Nanase Nishino's solo song "Gomen ne, zutto", the Nogizaka46 single "Harujion ga Sakukoro", the Radwimps song "Hikari", and the Momoiro Clover Z song "Sweet Wanderer". In 2016, Yamato adapted the George Asakura manga Drowning Love into a film titled Oboreru Knife (溺れるナイフ), starring Nana Komatsu. Yamato chose to adapt the story because young girls could relate to the main character's experiences.

For her third major film, Yamato wrote and directed Hot Gimmick: Girl Meets Boy, a 2019 adaptation of the Miki Aihara manga Hot Gimmick, about a teenager who gets blackmailed by the son of a powerful corporate executive. The film starred Miona Hori, a member of Nogizaka46 whom Yamato had initially met during the filming of the music video for the group's single "Harujion ga Sakukoro". That same year, Yamato organized and produced 21st Century Girl (21世紀の女の子), an anthology of short films by directors born in the 1980s and 1990s.

== Recognition ==
- 2014: Best New Director, 24th Japan Film Professional Awards

== Filmography ==
- Count Five to Dream of You (2014)
- Drowning Love (2016)
- Hot Gimmick: Girl Meets Boy (2019)
- All Our Tomorrows (2026)

== See also ==
- List of female film and television directors
