= 24th Japan Film Professional Awards =

Japanese film awards in 2015

- Date: May 9, 2015
- Site: Theatre Shinjuku, Tokyo, Japan

The 24th Japan Film Professional Awards (第24回日本映画プロフェッショナル大賞) was the 24th edition of the Japan Film Professional Awards. Films of 2014 which had not already won a major domestic film award were eligible. The ceremony took place on May 9, 2015 at Theatre Shinjuku in Tokyo.

== Awards ==
- Best Film: 100 Yen Love
- Best Director: Masaharu Take (100 Yen Love)
- Best Actress: Fumi Nikaidō (My Man, Au Revoir L'Ete)
- Best Actor: Sosuke Ikematsu (Love's Whirlpool, Undulant Fever, Drops in Your Hand, Pale Moon)
- Best New Director: Yūki Yamato (Like a Fairy Tale, Count Five to Dream of You)
- Best New Actress: Rina Takeda (The Tale of Iya)
- Popularity: The Sex Cannon Ball Run 2013
- Special: Tōru Shinagawa (Seven Weeks)

== 10 best films ==
1. 100 Yen Love (Masaharu Take)
2. My Man (Kazuyoshi Kumakiri)
3. Au Revoir L'Ete (Kōji Fukada)
4. Love's Whirlpool (Daisuke Miura)
5. Seven Weeks (Nobuhiko Obayashi)
6. Our Family (Yuya Ishii)
7. Undulant Fever (Hiroshi Ando)
8. Nishino Yukihiko no Koi to Bōken (Nami Iguchi)
9. The Voice of Water (Masashi Yamamoto)
10. Like a Fairy Tale (Yūki Yamato)
10. Tokyo Refugees (Kiyoshi Sasabe)
