= Drowning Love (film) =

- Theatrical release poster
- Kanji: 溺れるナイフ
- Directed by: Yūki Yamato
- Based on: Oboreru Knife by George Asakura
- Starring: Nana Komatsu; Masaki Suda; Daiki Shigeoka; Mone Kamishiraishi
- Distributed by: Gaga Corporation
- Release date: November 5, 2016 (Japan)
- Running time: 111 minutes
- Country: Japan
- Language: Japanese

Drowning Love (Japanese: 溺れるナイフ, Hepburn: Oboreru Knife) is a 2016 Japanese film directed by Yūki Yamato and based on George Asakura‘a manga series of the same name. It stars Nana Komatsu, Masaki Suda, Daiki Shigeoka, and Mone Kamishiraishi. It was released in Japan by Gaga Corporation on November 5, 2016.

== Synopsis ==
Natsume Mochizuki (Nana Komatsu) is a beautiful teen idol working in Tokyo. She is forced to give up her dream and move to her father's hometown of Ukigumo to help run her ailing grandfather's inn. There, she meets Koichiro Hasegawa (Masaki Suda), a young heir to a wealthy and deeply influential family, and for whom she will quickly start developing a romantic interest that will blossom in a tale of rough, passionate, and dangerous love.

The film calls to question sexuality, adult desires & roles assigned to members of society. The end considers what must occur when violence is used and the impact it has on others. Natsume, who everyone finds very beautiful, is often the desire of boys and men which makes her life dangerous.

== Cast ==
- Nana Komatsu as Natsume Mochizuki
- Masaki Suda as Kōichirō Hasegawa
- Daiki Shigeoka as Katsutoshi Ōtomo
- Mone Kamishiraishi as Kana Matsunaga
- Ryōhei Shima
- Yōichirō Saitō
- Gōichi Mine
- Ayumu Itō
- Masami Horiuchi
- Miwako Ichikawa as Meiko Mochizuki
- Mickey Curtis

== Production ==
Drowning Love was shot in Wakayama Prefecture. The Japanese band the Dress Codes were recruited for the movie's theme song, a rerecord of their song titled "Comic Generation".

== Reception ==
Edmund Lee of South China Morning Post rated the film 2.5/5, saying that the emotions are captured in an "alternately ecstatic and frustrating" fashion, and criticizing the film's decision to anchor the central narrative around the sexual assault scene.

The Member of Parliament Robert-Falcon Ouellette, who viewed the film at the Japanese Embassy in Canada, said “it is a film which should be seen by high school students and discussed in class. The violence pushes questions about what is acceptable and unacceptable in society.”
