= Yoshikatsu =

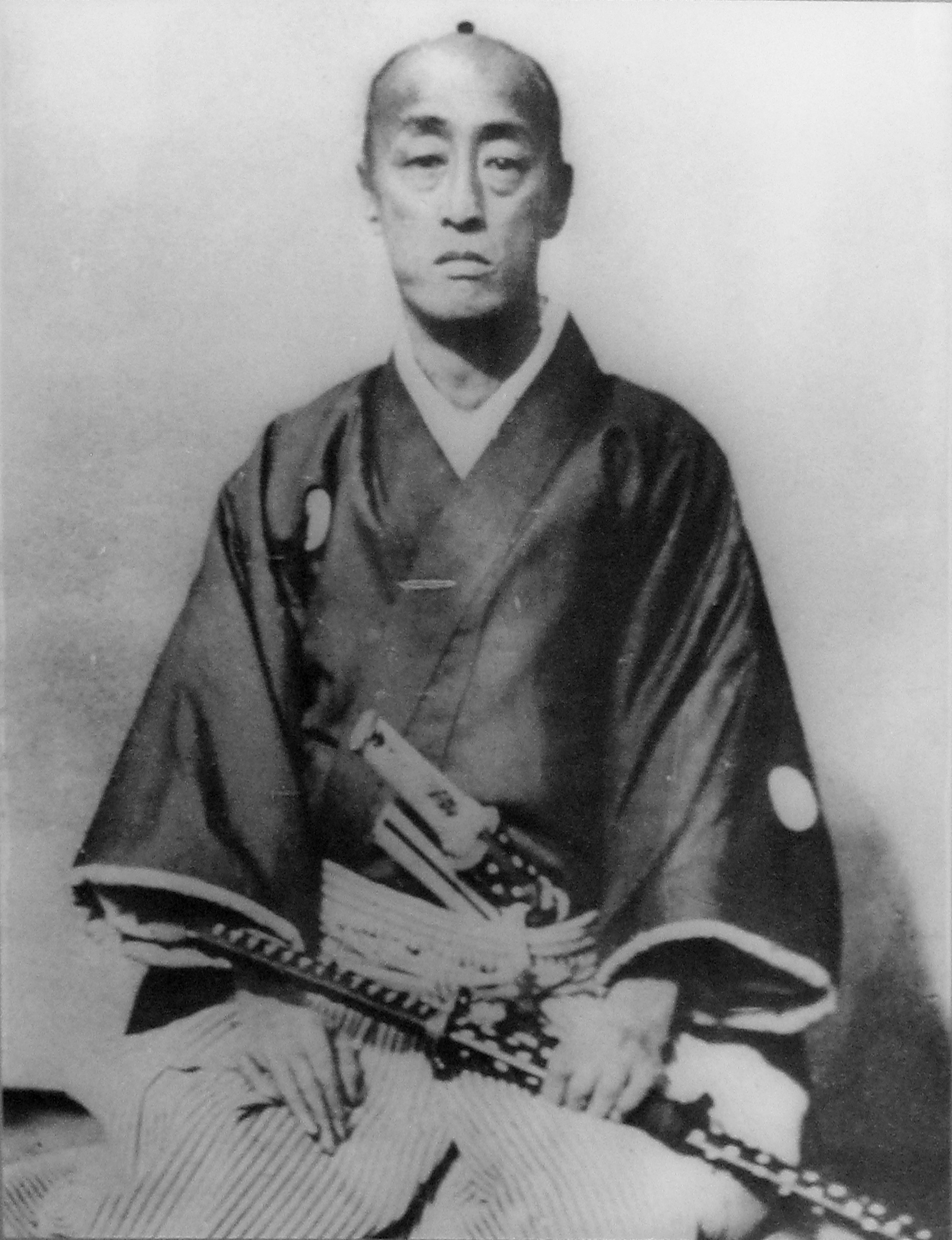
- Yoshikatsu Tokugawa (1824–1883), Japanese daimyō of the late Edo period
- Pronunciation: joɕikatsɯ (IPA)
- Gender: Male

Origin
- Origin: Japanese
- Meaning: Different meanings depending on the kanji used

Other names
- Alternative spelling: Yosikatu (Kunrei-shiki) Yosikatu (Nihon-shiki) Yoshikatsu (Hepburn)

Yoshikatsu is a masculine Japanese given name.

== Written forms ==
Yoshikatsu can be written using many different combinations of kanji characters. Here are some examples:

- 義克, "justice, overcome"
- 義勝, "justice, victory"
- 義活, "justice, alive"
- 吉克, "good luck, overcome"
- 吉勝, "good luck, victory"
- 吉活, "good luck, alive"
- 善克, "virtuous, overcome"
- 善勝, "virtuous, victory"
- 善活, "virtuous, alive"
- 芳克, "virtuous/fragrant, overcome"
- 芳勝, "virtuous/fragrant, victory"
- 芳活, "virtuous/fragrant, alive"
- 良克, "good, overcome"
- 良勝, "good, victory"
- 良活, "good, alive"
- 喜克, "rejoice, overcome"
- 慶克, "congratulate, overcome"

The name can also be written in hiragana よしかつ or katakana ヨシカツ.

== Notable people with the name ==
- Yoshikatsu Ashikaga (足利 義勝; 1434–1443), Japanese shōgun
- Yoshikatsu Fujiki (藤木 義勝; born 1964), Japanese actor and voice actor
- Yoshikatsu Kawaguchi (川口 能活; born 1975), Japanese footballer
- Yoshikatsu Mori (毛利 良勝; died 1582), Japanese samurai
- Yoshikatsu Nakayama (中山 義活; born 1945), Japanese politician
- Yoshikatsu Tokugawa (徳川 慶勝; 1824–1883), Japanese daimyō
- Yoshikatsu Yoshida (吉田 義勝; born 1941), Japanese sport wrestler
- Yoshikatsu ikeuchi (池内ヨシカツ; born), Japanese musician
