= Love's Whirlpool =

Love's Whirlpool may refer to:

- Love's Whirlpool (1924 film), an American silent crime drama film
- Love's Whirlpool (2014 film), a Japanese erotic romantic drama film
