= List of Hot Gimmick chapters =

The cover of Viz's English version of the first volume of Hot Gimmick, released in North America on October 29, 2003.

The chapters of the Japanese shōjo manga series Hot Gimmick were written and illustrated by Miki Aihara and serialized in the monthly manga anthology Betsucomi from the December 2000 issue to the August 2005 issue. Shogakukan then collected the 54 chapters into 12 tankōbon volumes, with volume 1 released on May 26, 2001, and volume 12 released on October 26, 2005. Shogakukan later re-released the series in six bunkoban volumes, with the first volume released on October 15, 2008 and the sixth on December 16, 2008.

In July 2003, Viz Media announced that they had licensed Hot Gimmick for an English-language translation and distribution in North America. Volume 1 was released on October 29, 2003, and volume 12 on September 19, 2006. Viz announced at Anime Expo 2008 that they would re-release Hot Gimmick in an omnibus "Vizbig" edition. The first omnibus volume, containing volumes 1 through 3, was released on March 17, 2009. Hot Gimmick has also been licensed in Italian by Planet Manga.

Hot Gimmick was adapted into a novel titled Hot Gimmick S (ホットギミックS, Hotto Gimikku S), written by Nishizaki Megumi and featuring illustrations by Miki Aihara. It was released in Japan by Shogakukan on November 1, 2005, and in North America by Viz Media on February 20, 2007. The novel features an alternate ending from the manga, focusing instead on the relationship between Hatsumi and Shinogu.

== Volume list ==
No.	Original release date	Original ISBN	English release date	English ISBN
01	May 26, 2001	978-4-09-135381-8	October 29, 2003	978-1-59116-214-8
Chapters 1–4; A Neighborhood Tour; Extra!! Gimmick
02	December 20, 2001	978-4-09-135382-5	December 31, 2003	978-1-59116-227-8
Chapters 5–9; A Neighborhood Tour
03	May 25, 2002	978-4-09-135383-2	March 17, 2004	978-1-59116-228-5
Chapters 10–14; Extra!! Gimmick
04	August 23, 2002	978-4-09-135384-9	May 12, 2004	978-1-59116-389-3
Chapters 15–19
05	December 19, 2002	978-4-09-135385-6	July 21, 2004	978-1-59116-144-8
Chapters 20–23
06	April 24, 2003	978-4-09-135386-3	September 7, 2004	978-1-56931-965-9
Chapters 24–27; Extra!! Gimmick
07	September 26, 2003	978-4-09-135387-0	November 24, 2004	978-1-59116-502-6
Chapters 28–32; Extra!! Gimmick
08	April 26, 2004	978-4-09-135388-7	March 1, 2005	978-1-59116-706-8
Chapters 33–36; Hot Gimmick01; Extra!! Gimmick
09	September 24, 2004	978-4-09-135389-4	July 5, 2005	978-1-59116-845-4
Chapters 37–41
10	February 25, 2005	978-4-09-135390-0	December 20, 2005	978-1-4215-0109-3
Chapters 42–46
11	July 26, 2005	978-4-09-130174-1	June 20, 2006	978-1-4215-0712-5
Chapters 47–51; Extra!! Gimmick
12	October 26, 2005	978-4-09-130233-5	September 19, 2006	978-1-4215-0825-2
Chapters 52–54; Bonus Episode: Hot Gimmick megamix; Extra!! Gimmick; Ten Days
