= Hot Gimmick =

Japanese shōjo manga series

- The English cover of the first manga volume, featuring Hatsumi Narita

ホットギミック (Hotto Gimikku)
- Genre: Romance
- Manga
- Written by: Miki Aihara
- Published by: Shogakukan
- English publisher: NA: Viz Media
- Imprint: Flower Comics
- Magazine: Betsucomi
- Original run: November 2000 – July 13, 2005
- Volumes: 12
- Light novel

Hot Gimmick S
- Written by: Megumi Nishizaki
- Illustrated by: Miki Aihara
- Published by: Shogakukan
- English publisher: NA: Viz Media
- Published: 2005
- Volumes: 1
- Other
- Hot Gimmick Compact Disk (HGCD) (2003 drama CD); Hot Gimmick Compact Disk 2 (HGCD2) (2004 drama CD); Hot Gimmick: Girl Meets Boy (2019 live-action film)

Hot Gimmick (Japanese: ホットギミック, Hepburn: Hotto Gimikku) is a Japanese shōjo manga series written and illustrated by Miki Aihara. It was serialized in Shogakukan's Betsucomi magazine from the December 2000 issue (released in November) to the August 2005 issue (released in July). Shogakukan collected the individual chapters into 12 bound volumes under the Flower Comics imprint. Viz Media licensed the series for an English-language release in North America.

Hot Gimmick inspired two drama CDs and an alternate-ending light novel, the latter of which is licensed by Viz Media. A live-action film adaptation, titled Hot Gimmick: Girl Meets Boy and directed by Yūki Yamato, was released in Japan on June 28, 2019.

== Plot ==
The story revolves around Hatsumi Narita, a passive sixteen-year-old girl who lives in a company housing complex that is ruled by the tyrannical Mrs. Tachibana, the wife of the company's vice president. How a family behaves in the housing complex can affect an employee's status in the company. When her promiscuous younger sister Akané thinks she might be pregnant, Hatsumi gets talked into buying her a pregnancy test. Unfortunately, things do not go as planned and Hatsumi is blackmailed by Ryōki Tachibana, the arrogant teenage son of the powerful Tachibana family who bullied her as a child, into being his slave.

== Characters ==
=== The Narita Family ===
Hatsumi Narita (成田初, Narita Hatsumi)

Portrayed by: Yui Horie/Tamaki Nakanishi (drama CDs), Miona Hori (film)

The main character of the series. At the beginning of the series, she is a second-year student at Takazono High School, a public school. When her younger sister Akané's fear of being pregnant leads Hatsumi into purchasing a pregnancy test for her, Ryōki Tachibana sees her with it and, in exchange for keeping this secret, Hatsumi becomes Ryōki's personal slave. However, when Hatsumi's childhood friend, Azusa Odagiri, moves back into the complex, she finds she has feelings for him. These feelings do not waver even after certain events rise up that would ordinarily cause her to sever ties with Azusa. Near the middle of the series however an absence of Azusa causes Hatsumi to shift attention and rationalize her now developing feelings for Ryōki, which she later concludes is love, with the hope Ryōki's actions will become less domineering.
Hatsumi is good-hearted but gullible. She does not form her own opinions and, despite talking herself up and reassuring herself that she will be assertive, has extreme difficulty standing up to people who misuse her. She is almost incapable of making her own decisions and spends more time thinking about others' well-being than her own. Hatsumi's low self-esteem is most likely the product of her upbringing; it is improbable she has ever been encouraged to set goals for herself outside of schoolwork and staying below the radar of the complex gossip hounds.
Akané Narita (成田茜, Narita Akané)

Portrayed by: Akeno Watanabe (drama CDs), Hiyori Sakurada (film)

Hatsumi's younger sister; somewhat of a floozy. She dates many boys, and early on harbors a conspicuous crush on Ryōki. After being rejected by him (and briefly taking out her anger on Hatsumi), she begins to develop feelings for Ryōki's best friend, Subaru Yagi. At the beginning of the series, she is a third-year junior high school student (it is mistakenly stated in earlier publications that Akané is a second-year). Despite being beautiful and popular, Akané is very insecure. She supports Hatsumi and Ryōki's relationship, occasionally offering her sister romantic advice.
Shinogu Narita (成田凌, Narita Shinogu)

Portrayed by: Shin-ichiro Miki/Yoshinori Ogino (drama CDs), Shotaro Mamiya (film)

The eldest of the Narita children. At the beginning of the series, he is a freshman law student at Hitotsubashi University. He is not home much due to various part-time jobs. Hatsumi learns later that Shinogu is adopted. He was taken in by the Naritas when he was a child, and his parents left him in extreme debt after they died. In an attempt to repay his adoptive parents, Shinogu moves out and holds down a slew of part-time jobs, putting aside his dreams of medical school.
Shinogu is kind and helpful. Like Hatsumi, he often puts others before himself. He is very dedicated and believes in doing the right thing, but is often wracked with guilt concerning the trouble he put his parents through, and his feelings for Hatsumi. Shinogu is in love with Hatsumi but, in an effort to not burden her with his feelings, tries to put distance between them. In the end, he tries to dissolute his adoption from the Naritas in an attempt to distance himself from Hatsumi further and become a priest.
Hikaru Narita (成田輝, Narita Hikaru)

Portrayed by: Etsuko Kozakura/Noriko Shitaya (drama CDs)

Hatsumi's younger brother. At the beginning of the series, he is in kindergarten.
Shihoko Narita (成田志保子, Narita Shihoko)
Hatsumi and Akane's mother. She is very afraid of Mrs. Tachibana, and does whatever she can to please her. Later in the series, she overcomes this fear and addresses Mrs. Tachibana about her continued mistreatment of their family.
Toru Narita (成田徹, Narita Tōru)
Hatsumi and Akane's father. He takes the blame for Miho Odagiri's death by confirming Azusa's conclusion that he was her lover, but it is later revealed that he was paid by his office superior, Shūichirō Tachibana, to be his scapegoat. He spends much time working away from home due to his unfavorably low position on the company ladder, but in the end returns to Tokyo under Shūichirō's orders as an apology for all the hardships the latter had given him and his family, he is presumably living again with his wife and children. Went to college with both Azusa's and Ryōki's fathers.

=== The Tachibana Family ===
Ryōki Tachibana (橘亮輝, Tachibana Ryōki)

Portrayed by: Kosuke Toriumi/Masazumi Ozo (drama CDs), Hiroya Shimizu (film)

Hatsumi's biggest fear since she was a child, due to him pushing her down the stairs. He turns Hatsumi into his personal slave, but also wants her as his girlfriend. Although he is abusive to her, there are times when he lets his guard down and shows that, despite his abusive way of showing it, he genuinely cares about her. At the beginning of the series, he is a second-year student at the prestigious private school, Kaisei Academy. It is revealed that when Hatsumi and Ryōki were kids in the company housing complex, that Hatsumi was Ryōki's sole friend, while Hatsumi was also friends with Azusa. Nevertheless, Ryōki did not treat Hatsumi well, even as a child, going as far as pushing Hatsumi down a flight of stairs, emotionally scarring her. This is revealed later to have been unintentional, giving young Ryōki an anxiety attack.
Ryōki becomes easily angry or jealous and does not like displaying other emotions. It is clear he has only ever been prized for his intelligence (which he reaffirms constantly around Hatsumi by calling her "dimwit," "birdbrain," etc.). Ryōki's family is disjointed and loveless, which is why he finds Hatsumi's devotion to her family incomprehensible. His family's past actions have influenced his views on relationships as well, such as strictly practicing and prizing monogamy in his relationship with Hatsumi, no doubt because of his father's past known affair with Azusa's mother. Ryōki displays great insecurity in his trust with relations involving Hatsumi, feeling at any second that she is off "flirting with other men". He expects just the same level of commitment and monogamic views from Hatsumi, which is seen throughout the series as a humorous assertion of power; with Ryōki demanding she should keep conversations with all men under one minute, answer the phone on the first ring when he calls, show up at least an hour early to all dates, and often overreacts when a male's name is mentioned in conversation, even if it's just Hikaru, Hatsumi's little brother. However, he is also seen often struggling to understand Hatsumi's reactions, helping her out of difficult situations and giving her his support.
Natsué Tachibana (橘奈津江, Tachibana Natsué)
Ryōki's mother and the undisputed "queen" of the company housing complex. She delights in manipulating the lives of those beneath her, starting malicious rumors and relocating workers based on their family's reputation. Multiple times she tries to separate Hatsumi and Ryōki, seeing Hatsumi as unsuitable and undeserving of her son. Natsué is presumably obsessed with controlling the people of the complex because she has almost no control in her own family (Ryōki never listens to a word she says and rebuffs her concerns with no emotion, and Shūichirō, in his rare appearances, easily undermines her at every turn). Natsué and Shūichirō are in an arranged marriage due to the wishes of their parents.
Shūichirō Tachibana (橘柊一郎, Tachibana Shūichirō)
Ryōki's father, he mostly stays at a hotel near the company so he hardly ever returns to the complex. Shūichirō and Natsué have an arranged marriage. As such, Shūichirō feels no love toward his wife or his son. When a young Ryōki asks his father why he's never around, Shūichirō alludes to a lover, whose identity is later revealed to be Miho Odagiri, Azusa's mother. The reason for Shūichirō never showing up to meet her was because he claims he asked her to leave her life, but she always chose Azusa and her husband. The reader assumes this is because Miho thought Shūichirō would remain persistent, as he did after their first separation.

=== The Odagiri Family ===
Azusa Odagiri (小田切梓, Odagiri Azusa)

Portrayed by: Hiroyuki Yoshino/Taisuke Yamamoto (drama CDs), Mizuki Itagaki (film)

An old friend of Hatsumi's. They were very good friends when they were younger; he always protected her from Ryōki. When he returns, he is a popular model doing magazine work and TV commercials. His return prompts Hatsumi to realize she has loved him since childhood.
At the beginning of the series, Azusa is outwardly nice, protective, caring and generous. As time goes on and secrets are revealed, Hatsumi discovers he is manipulative, self-destructive and severely depressed. Azusa is obsessed with revenge, using all his money from modeling to pay private detectives to discover who the lover of his mother was, and consequentially who was responsible for her death. He blamed Ryōki's family at one point, and tried to let his friends gang-rape Hatsumi in front of Ryōki. He is unconvinced that anyone truly cares for him and remains emotionally distant. Although, he has feelings for Hatsumi and cares for Shinogu as well, whom he supports his feelings for Hatsumi.
At the end of the series he decides to take Hatsumi away from Ryōki as revenge on Shūichirō.
Minoru Odagiri (小田切実, Odagiri Minoru)
Azusa's father who works mostly overseas so he hardly lives with his son. Divorced Azusa's mother, supposedly because she was having an affair. He is about to remarry, but worries about Azusa's opinion of it.
Miho Odagiri (小田切美宝, Odagiri Miho)
Azusa's mother, Minoru's ex-wife, and Shūichirō's former lover. She left with Azusa when Minoru divorced her and she became ostracized by the other wives in the complex. She soon fell ill but remained optimistic that her lover will return to her, as he promised. Died three years prior to the beginning of the series.

=== The Yagi Family ===
Subaru Yagi (八木すばる, Yagi Subaru)

Portrayed by: Soichiro Hoshi (drama CDs), Kaisei Kamimura (film)

Ryōki's dorky best friend, who is also a friend of Hatsumi. His hobbies are video games and anime (especially Gundam), and collecting models and action figures. He develops feelings for Akané, even though she often scares him, coming on too strong for him (as she's had many boyfriends and/or flings, and Subaru has never had a girlfriend). At the beginning of the series he is a second-year student at Takazono High School (Class A). Early on, it is implied that Subaru has a crush on Hatsumi, though these later fade when he develops feelings for Akané. He often worries about Ryōki and often tries to help him with Hatsumi.
Asahi Yagi (八木あさひ, Yagi Asahi)
Subaru's older sister. She graduated from beauty school and is currently working as an intern at a hair salon. She has a secret crush on Shinogu, but fails to tell him because he is "too unattainable." She often laments the dorkiness of her brother, and is fairly good friends with the Narita siblings as she worries about them often.

=== Others ===
Mariko Takatō (高遠万里子, Takatō Mariko)
The Tachibana family's maid. She has been in love with Shūichirō Tachibana ever since she was young, but he does not reciprocate her feelings. She's one of the few who truly cares about Ryōki, helping Hatsumi see that she is misreading his loneliness, jealousy, and his love for her as him being a cold, aloof tyrant.
Rina Katsuragi (葛城リナ, Katsuragi Rina)

Portrayed by: Akiko Hiramatsu (drama CDs), Riho Yoshioka (film)

Owner of a modeling agency and Azusa's manager. She has claimed her relationship with Azusa is one of "give and take," which started when she took him in as a runaway. He initially offered to sleep with her for money - instead, she took him on as a model. She cares for Azusa, though her emotions do not seem to matter to him.
Shūji Kazama (風間柊司, Kazama Shūji)
Shinogu's friend from work, and roommate. He has a crush on Akané and constantly flirts with her, fully aware that she is dating Subaru. Despite being very flirtatious, he offers good advice to characters experiencing relationship problems, especially Shinogu. He does not attempt to destroy Akané's relationship with Subaru (he helps them to grow closer). Kazama refers to himself as a "good guy."
Ruri Saionji (西園寺瑠璃, Saionji Ruri)
A girl who attends Teitoko Girls Academy and Ryōki's intellectual equal. After learning of Hatsumi and Ryōki's relationship, Natsué Tachibana makes multiple attempts to have her son enter date Ruri instead, considering her more deserving of his time. Ruri is obsessed with beating Ryōki on practice exams and proving she is more intelligent than he is.

== Light novel ==
Hot Gimmick S is a light novel spin-off of the manga, published in Japan in November 2005. It was written by Megumi Nishizaki and illustrated by Miki Aihara. The story focuses on the relationship between Hatsumi and Shinogu, with Hatsumi narrating. Characters from the manga also make brief appearances and play small roles in the story. A few new characters are introduced, as well.

The novel also introduces new nicknames never used in the manga: Hatsumi calls Akane "Aka-chin" and Hikaru "Hii-kun". At the age of two, she refers to herself as "Hami-tan" as opposed to "Hami-chan," like in the manga.

At the very end of the novel, a scene from volume nine of the manga where Shinogu and Hatsumi recall childhood memories while trapped in an elevator is featured. This section was falsely advertised as being an entirely new manga chapter about the two.

Viz Media licensed the novel for an English-language release in North America, published on February 20, 2007.

=== New characters ===
Wakana Nanami
A friend of Shinogu's who works with him as a tour conductor. She frequently visits him at the café where he works. Upon meeting Hatsumi, Wakana urges her to "root" for her in her quest to have Shinogu as her boyfriend. She is ambitious, good-looking, and not unkind despite her pursuit of Shinogu. Shinogu calls her "Nana".
Satoko Shinoda
Shihoko's mother and a probation officer. She was assigned to Yuko's family, among others. She died before Akané was born.
Yuko Tanizaki
Shinogu's biological mother and an old friend of Shihoko. Both her parents have criminal records (her father for theft, her mother for drugs), and she routinely shoplifts. Years later she becomes an alcoholic, dates an abusive gambler, and often beats her son.
Yuko's boyfriend
Yuko's unnamed boyfriend has no job and amasses drastic gambling debts. When he loses, he vents his anger by beating Yuko and Shinogu.
Satoru Shionoya
Shihoko's first love and biological father of Shinogu. After being introduced to Yuko, he falls in love with her instead, and the two elope. Years later he leaves Yuko and Shinogu to attend university, claiming "This is not my life."

== Live-action film ==
On September 24, 2018, a live-action film adaptation was announced for release in the following year. The following day, Aihara posted about the film on her blog. On December 17, Toei Company, the film's distributor, confirmed the release date as June 28, 2019. On March 14, 2019, the film's full title was revealed to be Hot Gimmick: Girl Meets Boy. The same day, the first poster and teaser trailer were released.

=== Cast ===
- Miona Hori as Hatsumi Narita
- Shotaro Mamiya as Shinogu Narita
- Hiyori Sakurada as Akané Narita
- Hiroya Shimizu as Ryōki Tachibana
- Mizuki Itagaki as Azusa Odagiri
- Riho Yoshioka as Rina Katsuragi
- Kaisei Kamimura as Subaru Yagi
