= Tsubasa Imai =

Tsubasa Imai 今井 翼
- Born: October 17, 1981 (age 44); Fujisawa, Kanagawa, Japan
- Origin: Shonan
- Genres: J-pop
- Years active: 1995–present
- Label: Avex

Tsubasa Imai (今井 翼, Imai Tsubasa; born October 17, 1981) is a Japanese singer, actor and dancer formerly in the Japanese agency Johnny & Associates. He joined Johnny & Associates in 1995 and officially debuted in 2002 in the duo Tackey & Tsubasa with Hideaki Takizawa. They are signed to the record label Avex Trax. Imai released his first solo single, "Backborn", on February 24, 2010.

== Profile ==
Tsubasa Imai was born in Fujisawa, Japan, on October 17, 1981. Among his colleagues, he is known as a very talented dancer. His close friends among those in Johnny Entertainment agency are Hideaki Takizawa, Tsuyoshi Domoto, Toma Ikuta and Sho Sakurai. His nicknames are Tsuba and Imai-kun. He is an avid fan of the Japanese baseball team, the Yokohama BayStars, having supporting them since the time they were known as Taiyou Whales.

Tsubasa is known as one of the "Four Dancing Kings" in the Johnny & Associate agency along with Koichi Domoto of KinKi Kids. He has also appeared in many dramas and was the second lead in the annual musical production Shock. He returned to play the second lead role in the 2005 production of Endless Shock.

== Career ==
=== Audition ===
Tsubasa's older sister who was a fan of TOKIO sent in his application. During the audition, Johnny Kitagawa noticed his dancing and remarked, "YOU dance well." Tsubasa was originally supposed to debut solo, but decided along with Takizawa they would debut as a unit, Tackey & Tsubasa.

=== Flamenco ===
In 2007 Tsubasa took a trip to Spain where he instantly fell in love with flamenco. He studied under the professional flamenco artist Hiroki Sato.

=== Ménière's Disease ===
While rehearsing for Playzone in 2014, Tsubasa began to experience vertigo and found difficulty standing. He was admitted to the hospital where he was diagnosed with Ménière's Disease.

== Filmography ==
=== Television ===
- Mokuyou no kaidan (1995)
- Brothers (ブラザーズ) (1998)
- Summer Snow (2000)
- Never Land (2001)
- Saigo no Bengonin (The Last Lawyer) (2003)
- Haru to Natsu (2005)
- Yoshitsune (2005), Nasu no Yoichi
- Kirin ga Kuru (2020), Mōri Shinsuke
- Pops Loves Kawaii Stuff (2020)

=== Film ===
- Life in Overtime (2018)
- What She Likes... (2021)
- Tell Me (2022), Hiroshi
- Ice on the Moon (2025), Ryuji Kitamura

=== Anime ===
- Layton Detective Agency ~Katrielle's Mystery Solving Files~ as Simon Wright (2018)

== Discography ==
See: Tackey & Tsubasa Discography

=== Singles ===
Title	Information	Sales
"Backborn"	Released: February 24, 2010; Format: CD5; Oricon Top 200 weekly peak: #2	32,110

=== Radio ===
- To base (翼のto base) is Tsubasa's weekly radio show which is broadcast on the Japanese radio station JORQ AM 1134 kHz.

=== TV ===
- TV de Spain-Go

=== Commercials ===
- Tongari Corn Commercial spokesperson ( 2001–2006 )
- Nissin (2011)

=== Concerts ===
- "TSUBACON" 2004 (August 6–18, 2004)
- "23 to 24" First Solo Tour 2005 (September 17 - November 6; December 28–29, 2005)
- "STYLE" 2006 Tour (August 12 - October 1, 2006)
- "Dance and Rock Tour '09 (2009)
- LHTOUR 2011 Dance & Rock Third Floor ~DiVelN to SExaLiVe (2011)

=== Stage ===
An annual musical production, Shock is performed in the Imperial Garden Theater in Tokyo. The lead role is played by Koichi Domoto of KinKi Kids and Tsubasa acts in the second leading role.

- Shock 2000 - Millenium Shock (November 2–26)
- Shock 2001-2002 - Shock (December 1–25; January 3–27)
- Shock 2002 - Shock (June 4–28)
- Shock 2004 - Shocking Shock (February 6–29）
- Shock 2005 - Endless Shock (January 8 - February 28）
- Shock 2006 - Endless Shock (February 6 - March 29）
- "World Wing 翼 Premium (2007)
- "World Wing 翼 Premium (2008)
- PLAYZONE 2010 - ROAD TO PLAYZONE
- PLAYZONE 2011 - SONG & DANC'N
- PLAYZONE 2012 - SONG & DANC'N PART II
- PLAYZONE 2013 - SONG & DANC'N PART III
- PLAYZONE 1986….2014 ★Arigatou! ~AOYAMA THEATRE★ (July 6 - September)
- PLAYZONE 2015 - ★Sayonara! ~AOYAMA THEATRE★ PLAYZONE 30YEARS
- Burn the Floor 2012 - Around the World Tour (December 5–9 TOKYU Theatre Orb; December 12–16 Orix Theatre Osaka)
- Burn the Floor 2014 - Dance with You (May 2–7 TOKYU Theatre Orb; May 9–13 Festival Hall; May 16–18 Nagoya Congress Center)
- GOEMON (2014)
- GOEMON (2016)
- Marius (2017)
- Musical GOYA (2021) title role

=== Videos/DVDs ===
- "TSUBACON" 2004
- "23 to 24" First Solo Tour 2005
- Dance and Rock Tour '09
- LHTOUR 2011 Dance & Rock Third Floor ~DiVelN to SExaLiVe
