= Hot Gimmick: Girl Meets Boy =

2019 film by Yûki Yamato

- Film poster
- Directed by: Yūki Yamato
- Written by: Yûki Yamato; Miki Aihara
- Based on: Shōjo manga Hot Gimmick
- Starring: Miona Hori; Hiroya Shimizu; Mizuki Itagaki; Shotaro Mamiya
- Distributed by: Toei Company; Netflix
- Release date: 28 June 2019 (Japan)
- Running time: 119 minutes
- Country: Japan
- Language: Japanese

Hot Gimmick: Girl Meets Boy is a 2019 Japanese coming-of-age romance film written and directed by Yūki Yamato. The film stars Mizuki Itagaki, Miona Hori and Hiroya Shimizu in the lead roles. The film is based on the manga series, Hot Gimmick. The film had its theatrical release on 28 June 2019 and received negative reviews from critics. It was also streamed via Netflix on 28 December 2019.

== Synopsis ==
Hatsumi Narita (Miona Hori) is an ordinary high school girl. She shares an apartment with her adopted older brother, Shinogu Narita (Shotaro Mamiya), and biological younger sister Akane Narita (Hiyori Sakurada), and parents. One day, she allows the neighbourhood teenage boy Ryoki Tachibana (Hiroya Shimizu) who also lives in the same apartment building to see her. However things go wrong for Hatsumi as Ryoki takes advantage of her weakness and blackmails her to get his wishes fulfilled. Suddenly Hatsumi's neighbour/childhood friend, Azusa Odagiri (Mizuki Itagaki) comes to see Hatsumi and it causes further trouble for Hatsumi as she is bullied and blackmailed by both boys.

== Cast ==
- Miona Hori as Hatsumi Narita
- Shotaro Mamiya as Shinogu Narita
- Hiyori Sakurada as Akane Narita
- Hiroya Shimizu as Ryoki Tachibana
- Mizuki Itagaki as Azusa Odagiri
- Riho Yoshioka as Rina Katsuragi
- Kaisei Kamimura as Subaru Yagi

== Production ==
The film announcement was made by director Yûki Yamato in 2018 stating that the film would be a live-action film based on the manga series, Hot Gimmick. Principal photography of the film was commenced on 24 September 2018 and shooting of the film concluded in October 2018. On 25 September 2018, Aihara posted regarding the details of the film on her blog. On 17 December 2018, Toei Company, the film's distributor, confirmed the release date as June 28, 2019. On March 14, 2019, the film's full title was revealed to be Hot Gimmick: Girl Meets Boy. and the subtitle was kept as Girl Meets Boy in order to avoid the confusion with the manga Hot Gimmick.
