= Shock (musical) =

2000 Japanese musical

- 2024 promotional poster
- Book: Johnny Kitagawa
- Setting: Broadway, New York City
- Premiere: November 2, 2000; 25 years ago: Imperial Theatre
- Productions: 2000 Tokyo; 2001 Tokyo; 2002 Tokyo; 2003 Tokyo; 2004 Tokyo; 2005 Tokyo; 2006 Tokyo; 2007 Tokyo; 2008 Tokyo; 2009 Tokyo; 2010 Tokyo; 2011 Tokyo; 2012 Tokyo; 2013 Tokyo, Osaka, Fukuoka; 2014 Tokyo, Osaka, Fukuoka; 2015 Tokyo, Osaka, Fukuoka; 2016 Tokyo; 2017 Tokyo, Osaka, Fukuoka; 2018 Tokyo; 2019 Tokyo, Osaka; 2020 Tokyo, Osaka; 2021 Tokyo; 2022 Tokyo, Fukuoka; 2023 Tokyo; 2024 Tokyo, Osaka, Fukuoka
- Awards: 33rd Kazuo Kikuta Theater Award; 45th Kazuo Kikuta Theater Award

Shock (ショック) is a series of musical works starring Koichi Domoto (from the duo KinKi Kids), who is also in charge of the planning, music, story, and production under Johnny Kitagawa’s direction. Shock was originally based on the musical 1991 Playzone '91 Shock (1991, starring Shonentai), and premiered at the Imperial Theater in November 2000 under the title Millenium Shock. It has been performed at the same theater every year since, with different modifications in the title, cast, plot and programs each year. In 2005, it was revamped entirely as Endless Shock, which has been its title until now. Shock's annual performances are greatly anticipated, and it is dubbed “the stage of which tickets are the hardest to get in Japan” by the media.

Shock reached its 400th performance in 2006, and its 499th performance in 2007, attracting more than 80,000 audiences up until that point. Shock is the solo-starring stage play to achieve this feat in the shortest time at the Imperial Theater.

April 2008, Endless Shock received the Grand Prize Award at the 33rd "Kikuta Kazuo Theater Award" for high achievements in stage performance. This was the first time a musical starring an idol from Johnny & Associates won such an honor.

March 2009, Koichi Domoto set a new record for the highest number of solo-starring musical performances at the Imperial Theater.

March 21, 2013, 12 years 5 months after its premiere, Shock reached its 1,000th performance, became the solo-starring musical play to achieve this in the shortest time in Japan.

In April 2020, Koichi Domoto alone was awarded the Grand Prize of the 45th Kazuo Kikuta Theater Awards for his achievement for leading Shock series for twenty years, becoming the youngest single winner of this award.

Until 2021, Shock has been performed for more than 1,800 times, becoming the 2nd most-performed musical with the same leading actor in Japan, after Mitsuko Mori's Hourouki (performed 2,017 times).

== Overview ==
Shock is about the conflicts happening in a theater company, interspersed with the shows performed by said company - a "play within a play". The series focuses on the theme "Show must go on" with Koichi, the company's leader as the protagonist. Through his collaborations, conflicts, and reconciliations with the company members, the musical portrays a "stage of life" where even life is sacrificed for the ultimate performances. Koichi Domoto said “I'm completely different from Koichi”, but they both share an unyielding, uncompromising attitude to the stage, even when facing injuries or accidents. Koichi Domoto himself also stated that he was able to cultivate such mindset thanks to continuously performing this play.

The play has a diverse combination of famous musical numbers and original songs in various style, from New York Broadway to traditional Japanese. Aside from difficult choreographies, Shock also includes numerous flashy, dangerous acts such as flying, falling down an 8-metre high staircase... , and is said to be able to “surprise the audience every 5 minutes”.

Under Johnny Kitagawa's production, Shock was originally intended to be a play that can impress the audiences even if they don't understand the speech. However, as an actor, Koichi Domoto wanted the stage to convey deeper meaning, and asked Kitagawa to make thorough changes, including the plot. With Kitagawa's approval (“Just do what you like.”), Koichi started taking a substantial role in screenwriting, music composing and producing since 2005.

After Endless Shock 2006, there were plans to end the Shock series and start a new play in 2007, also with Koichi Domoto as the producer and lead actor. However, due to high demand (demand for tickets was 14 times higher than supply), it was decided that the play would be performed again in 2007. Shock continues to be performed every year since, and is said to be “the stage of which tickets are the hardest to get in Japan”.

During the noon performance on January 23, 2008, due to electricity failure, the play was cancelled and moved to another date (February 17, 2008) for the first time. Koichi Domoto deeply regretted this, and wrote on the official site: "It is truly regrettable that the performance couldn't continue like the theme 'Show must go on'. To the audiences who was looking forward to the stage, I sincerely apologize." After the cancellation decision was made, all the cast came out to see the audiences off to the last one. The night performance that day still went on as scheduled.

March 11, 2011, the Great Tohoku earthquake occurred during the noon performance's intermission. The audiences and some of the cast were evacuated to Koukyogaien, and the performance - incidentally, also Shock's 800th performance - was cancelled. Due to aftershocks and planned power outage, performances could not resume as planned, and the rest of the performances that year were also cancelled. Cancellation announcement was made before the performance on the 13th by Koichi Domoto himself. He then shook hand with and saw all the audiences off.

During the noon performance on March 19, 2015, a 650 kilograms (1,430 lb) LED panel used in stage setting collapsed, injured 6 people: trainees Takayoshi Kishi, 2 dancers, 2 acrobat actors, and 1 staff member. The two performances that day were cancelled, and Koichi Domoto came out in full stage costume to apologize to the audiences for the accident and the cancellation. Performance restarted the next day without the use of LED panel and part of the program changed. There were mixed opinions about restarting performances so soon after such a serious accident, but the decision was made with support from the cast and staff, even the injured ones, to convey the theme of the play: continue to move forward despite unfavorable circumstances. May 20, 2015, Toho announced that the accident was caused by an inclination due to partial failure of the stage floor, and that reinforcement work was planned to correct this. Toho also officially prohibit future use of mobile LED panels on its stage for caution's sake.

On September 17 of the same year, during the Osaka tour, the actress who played the owner role, Bibari Maeda, fell and broke her left shoulder while walking to Umeda Arts Theatre from her hotel. She still acted in two performances on the 17th, but was hospitalized after the night performance and was told to rest for 1.5 month for the break to heal. Katsuhide Uekusa from Shonentai, who played the owner during 2009 - 2012, stepped in for Maeda from the performance on the 18th until the last one in 2015. Uekusa received direct appeal from Johnny Kitagawa and Koichi Domoto on the evening of the 17th, arrived in Osaka around noon on the 18th, and only had 4 hours to practice with all the cast. Nevertheless, the performances went on smoothly as usual.

In April 2020, Koichi alone was awarded the Grand Prize of the 45th Kazuo Kikuta Theater Awards for his achievement for leading Shock series for twenty years, becoming the youngest single winner of this award.

In 2021, Endless Shock was made into a movie.

It was announced that the Shock series starring Koichi would end after the 2024 performance. The reasons given were that the Imperial Theatre will be closed for reconstruction in February 2025, and since Koichi created it around the age of 25 and the age setting was about the same, he thought that 2024, when he would be 45, would be a good time.

On April 22, 2024, the play reached 2000 performances and on May 9, 2018. It broke the record of 2017 times that Mitsuko Mori had accumulated between 1961 and 2009 with "Hourouki" and also became the single largest single starring role record in a domestic play.

== Milleninum Shock (2000) ==
=== Performance period ===
November 2–26, 2000 (Imperial Theatre) (38 performances)

=== Story ===
Koichi, leader of a travelling theatre company, decides to carry on performances despite the injuries of fellow member TSUBASA, and this brings about conflicts with other members of the company. At such a time, the company receives an invitation to perform at Broadway - where Koichi's older brother died 3 years before. Despite opposition from others, Koichi pushes on to Broadway, and meets a mysterious person who claimed to be his deceased brother's friend...

=== Cast ===
- Koichi Domoto as Koichi: he seeks to realize his dreams on behalf of his deceased brother
- Noriyuki Higashiyama as Koichi's elder brother: he took his life on Broadway
- Tsubasa Imai as Koichi's brother-in-law: he lost his dream of going on stage in an accident and closed his mind.
- Akira Akasaka as rival
- Honoka Suzuki as brother-in-sister (Higashiyama's wife)
- Eisuke Sasai
- Jun Akiyama
- Shingo Machida
- Tsuyoshi Yonehara
- Tomoyuki Yara
- Tatsuya Ueda
- Nakamaru Yuuichi
- Akanishi Jin

== Show Geki Shock (2001 - 2002) ==
=== Performance period ===
- December 1, 2001 - January 27, 2002 (Imperial Theatre) (76 performances)
- June 4–28, 2002 (38 performances)

=== Story ===
To fulfill his deceased brother's wish, Koichi continues performing every day with “Show must go on” in mind. His performances are popular, and he receives invitation to perform at the Broadway theatre Imperial Garden Theatre. However, he faces strong opposition from the company because it was where his brother died, and because he wants to leave behind TSUBASA, whose future as a dancer was abruptly cut off due to an accident when performing. Still, Koichi leaves for New York, leaving behind his brother's ex-wife SAKIHO, SAKIHO's current husband TAKU, and a disappointed TSUBASA. A lot of troubles are waiting for Koichi there...

=== Cast ===
- Koichi Domoto as Koichi and Koichi's brother
- Juri Sakiho as Tsubasa's sister and Koichi's brother's ex-wife
- Tsubasa Imai as Brother-in-law. He was in a motorcycle accident.
- Ryo Nishikido as Sakiho's son
- Takuya Kon as Taku: Sakiho's current husband and company manager
- Jun Akiyama
- Shingo Machida
- Tsuyoshi Yonehara
- Tomoyuki Yara
- Kamenashi Kazuya
- Akanishi Jin
- Tatsuya Ueda
- Taguchi Junnosuke
- Hagesawa Jun
- Shota Totsuka
- Yoshikazu Toshin
- Yudai Tatsumi
- Koyama Keiichirou
- Yabu Kota

== Shock is Real Shock (2003) ==
=== Performance period ===
January 8 - February 25, 2003 (Imperial Theatre) (76 performances)

=== Story ===
Almost the same as Show Geki Shock, the last production, but with some changes in characters’ names (characters are named based on the casts’ real names) and the mastermind.

=== Cast ===
- Koichi Domoto
- Mie
- Toma Ikuta
- Jun Inoue
- Jun Akiyama
- Shingo Machida
- Tsuyoshi Yonehara
- Tomoyuki Yara
- Yoshikazu Toshin
- Shunsuke Kazama
- KAT-TUN
- A.B.C.

== Shocking Shock (2004) ==
=== Performance period ===
February 6–29, 2004 (Imperial Theatre) (38 performances)

=== Story ===
Generally the same as Shock is real Shock (different production).

=== Cast ===
- Koichi Domoto
- Tsubasa Imai
- Iori Naoka
- Isao Bitou
- Yoshikazu Toshin
- Jun Akiyama
- Shingo Machida
- Tsuyoshi Yonehara
- Tomoyuki Yara
- Shunsuke Kazama
- Shota Totsuka

== Endless Shock (2005 - 2024) ==
Plot and characters were significantly changed. Starting 2013, the owner's role was changed to a woman, new songs and programs were added, but the main storyline remains the same.

=== Performance period ===
- 2005: January 8 - February 28 (Imperial Theatre) (76 performances)
- 2006: February 6 - March 29 (Imperial Theatre) (76 performances)
- 2007: January 6 - February 28 (Imperial Theatre) (81 performances)
- 2008: January 6 - February 26 (Imperial Theatre) (76 performances)
- 2009: February 5 - March 30 (Imperial Theatre) (76 performances)
- 2010: February 14 - March 30, July 4 - 31st (Imperial Theatre) (100 performances) (first time the play was performed in summer as Endless Shock)
- 2011: February 5 - March 10 (Imperial Theatre) (48 performances) (performances from March 11 cancelled due to the Great Tohoku earthquake)
- 2012:
  - January 7–31 (Hakata-za) (34 performances) (first time Shock was performed in another province outside Tokyo)
  - February 7 - April 30 (Imperial Theatre) (105 performances)
- 2013:
  - February 4 - March 31 (Imperial Theatre) (76 performances)
  - April 8–30 (Hakataza) (29 performances)
  - September 2–29 (Umeda Arts Theater) (35 performances) (first time Shock was performed in Osaka)
- 2014:
  - February 4 - March 31 (Imperial Theatre) (76 performances)
  - September 8–30 (Umeda Arts Theater) (30 performances)
  - October 8–31 (Hakataza) (30 performances)
- 2015:
  - February 3 - March 31 (Imperial Theatre) (73 performances)
  - September 8–30 (Umeda Arts Theatre) (30 performances)
  - October 7–31 (Hakataza) (30 performances)
- 2016: February 4 - March 31 (Imperial Theatre) (75 performances)
- 2017:
  - February 1 - March 31 (Imperial Theatre) (78 performances)
  - September 8–30 (Umeda Arts Theatre) (30 performances)
  - October 10–31 (Hakataza) (30 performances)
- 2018: February 4 - March 31 (Imperial Theatre) (70 performances)
- 2019
  - February 4 - March 31 (Imperial Theatre) (70 performances)
  - September 11 - October 5 (Umeda Arts Theatre) (31 performances)
- 2020: February 4–26 (Imperial Theatre) (26 performances) (performances from February 27 cancelled due to coronavirus pandemic)
- 2022
  - September 5, 2022 - October 2 (Hakata-za)
- 2023
  - April 9, 2023 - May 31, (Imperial Theatre)
- 2024
  - April 11 - May 31, (Imperial Theatre) (56 performances)
  - July 26 - August 18 (Umeda Arts Theatre) (29 performances)
  - September 1-29 (Hakata-za) (31 performances)
  - November 8-29 (Imperial Theatre) (26 performances)
  - The final performance, on November 29, 2024, will be live viewed in movie theaters throughout Japan.

=== Story ===
The show Koichi performs at his childhood friend's small off-Broadway theater (starting 2013, the childhood friend setting was removed) receives high acclaim on the newspaper. This opens up a way to go on-Broadway for the theater. Koichi who sets his heart on Broadway, the owner (name changed depended on the cast) who wants to protect his theater, the fellow company member (name changed depended on the cast) who considers Koichi as his rival, RIKA who blindly worships Koichi,... Each of them pursued their own ambition, and the company that used to be so close to each other starts falling apart. One day, the rival member who often clashes with Koichi switches the prop sword used on stage for a real one to test Koichi's creed of beliefs “Show must go on”...

=== Cast ===
==== Endless Shock 2005 ====
- Koichi Domoto as Koichi
- Tsubasa Imai / Ryo Nishikido (double cast as the rival)
- Meisa Kuroki / Komiyama Mika (double cast as Rika)
- Jun Akiyama as the owner
- Shingo Machida as Machida
- Tomoyuki Yara as Yara
- Tsuyoshi Yonehara as Yonehara
- Koichi Goseki
- Shota Totsuka
- Ryoichi Tsukada
- Fumito Kawai
- Yuya Takaki
- Yuto Nakajima
- Daiki Arioka
- Naoki Ishikawa

==== Endless Shock 2006 ====
- Koichi Domoto (Koichi)
- Tsubasa Ima / Nishikido Ryo (double cast as the rival)
- Tabata Aya (as Rika)
- Jun Akiyama (the owner)
- Shingo Machida
- Tomoyuki Yara
- Tsuyoshi Yonehara
- Yuta Fukuda
- Yusuke Matsuzaki
- Yudai Tatsumi
- Yusuke Koshioka
- Naoki Ishikawa

==== Endless Shock 2007 ====
- Koichi Domoto (Koichi)
- Toma Ikuta (the rival)
- Marika Matsumoto (Rika)
- Jun Akiyama (the owner)
- Shingo Machida
- Tomoyuki Yara
- Tsuyoshi Yonehara
- Yuta Fukuda
- Yusuke Matsuzaki
- Yudai Tatsumi
- Yusuke Koshioka
- Naoki Ishikawa

==== Endless Shock 2008 ====
- Koichi Domoto (Koichi)
- Tomoyuki Yara (the rival)
- RiRiKA (Rika)
- Tadayoshi Okura (the owner)
- Shingo Machida
- Tsuyoshi Yonehara
- Yuta Fukuda
- Yusuke Matsuzaki
- Yudai Tatsumi
- Yusuke Koshioka
- Naoki Ishikawa

==== Endless Shock 2009 ====
- Koichi Domoto (Koichi)
- Tomoyuki Yara (the rival)
- Satou Megumi (the owner's daughter)
- Katsuhide Uekusa (the owner)
- Shingo Machida
- Tsuyoshi Yonehara
- Yuta Fukuda
- Yusuke Matsuzaki
- Yudai Tatsumi
- Yusuke Koshioka
- Naoki Ishikawa

==== Endless Shock 2010 ====
- Koichi Domoto (Koichi)
- Tomoyuki Yara (the rival) (February and March performances)
- Hiroki Uchi (the rival) (July performances)
- Katsuhide Uekusa (the owner)
- Satou Megumi (Rika)
- Shingo Machida
- Tsuyoshi Yonehara
- Yuta Fukuda
- Yusuke Matsuzaki
- Yudai Tatsumi
- Yusuke Koshioka
- Naoki Ishikawa

==== Endless Shock 2011 ====
- Koichi Domoto (Koichi)
- Hiroki Uchi (the rival)
- Katsuhide Uekusa (the owner)
- Harada Natsuki (Rika)
- Shingo Machida
- Tsuyoshi Yonehara
- Yuta Fukuda
- Yusuke Matsuzaki
- Yudai Tatsumi
- Yusuke Koshioka
- Naoki Ishikawa

==== Endless Shock 2012 ====
- Koichi Domoto (Koichi)
- Hiroki Uchi (the rival)
- Katsuhide Uekusa (the owner)
- Kanda Sayaka (Rika)
- Shingo Machida
- Tsuyoshi Yonehara
- Yuta Fukuda
- Yusuke Matsuzaki
- Yudai Tatsumi
- Yusuke Koshioka
- Naoki Ishikawa

==== Endless Shock 2013 ====
- Koichi Domoto (Koichi)
- Bibari Maeda (the owner)
- Tomoyuki Yara (the rival) (February - April performances)
- Hiroki Uchi (the rival) (September performances)
- Santos Anna (Rika)
- Yuta Fukuda
- Yusuke Matsuzaki
- Yudai Tatsumi
- Yusuke Koshioka
- Ryota Yamamoto
- Yuta Kishi
- Naoki Ishikawa

==== Endless Shock 2014 ====
- Koichi Domoto (Koichi)
- Mori Kumiko (the owner)
- Tomoyuki Yara (the rival) (February - March performances)
- Hiroki Uchi (the rival) (September - October performances)
- Iriki Mari (Rika)
- Yuta Fukuda
- Yusuke Matsuzaki
- Yudai Tatsumi
- Yusuke Koshioka
- Ryota Yamamoto
- Yuta Kishi (February - March performances)
- Nishihata Daigo (September - October performances)
- Naoki Ishikawa

==== Endless Shock 2015 ====
- Koichi Domoto (Koichi)
- Bibari Maeda (the owner) (until the night performance of September 17)
- Katsuhide Uekusa (the owner) (since September 18)
- Tomoyuki Yara (the rival) (February - March performances)
- Hiroki Uchi (the rival) (September - October performances)
- Ema Miyazawa (Rika) (February - March performances)
- Kikuchi Mika (Rika) (September - October performances)
- Yuta Fukuda (February - March performances)
- Yusuke Koshioka (February - March performances)
- Yudai Tatsumi (September - October performances)
- Yusuke Matsuzaki (September - October performances)
- Nozawa Yuuki
- Yuta Kishi (February - March performances)
- Shoki Motoyoshi
- Takayoshi Kishi
- Kaito Matsukura (September - October performances)
- Naoki Ishikawa

==== Endless Shock 2016 ====
- Koichi Domoto (Koichi)
- Bibari Maeda (the owner)
- Tomoyuki Yara (the rival)
- Kominami Mayuko (Rika)
- Yudai Tatsumi (February performances)
- Yusuke Koshioka (February performances)
- Yuta Fukuda (March performances)
- Yusuke Matsuzaki (March performances)
- Nozawa Yuuki
- Shoki Motoyoshi
- Takayoshi Kishi
- Kaito Matsukura
- Naoki Ishikawa

==== Endless Shock 2017 ====
- Koichi Domoto (Koichi)
- Bibari Maeda (the owner)
- Tomoyuki Yara (the rival) (February - March performances)
- Hiroki Uchi (the rival) (September - October performances)
- Miyabi Matsuura (Rika)
- Yuta Fukuda (February - March performances)
- Yusuke Matsuzaki (February - March performances)
- Yudai Tatsumi (September - October performances)
- Yusuke Koshioka (September - October performances)
- Hamanaka Bunichi
- Takuto Teranishi
- Genta Matsuda
- Kaito Matsukura
- Naoki Ishikawa (February - March and October performances)

==== Endless Shock 2018 ====
- Koichi Domoto (Koichi)
- Kuno Akiko (the owner)
- Yuma Nakayama (the rival)
- Takimoto Miori (Rika)
- Yuta Fukuda
- Yusuke Matsuzaki
- Yudai Tatsumi (September - October performances)
- Takuto Teranishi
- Genta Matsuda
- Kaito Matsukura
- Noel Kawashima
- Naoki Ishikawa

==== Endless Shock 2019 ====
- Koichi Domoto (Koichi)
- Bibari Maeda (the owner)
- Hiroki Uchi (the rival) (February - March performances)
- Yuma Nakayama (the rival) (September - October performances)
- Ayaka Umeda (Rika)
- Yuta Fukuda
- Yusuke Matsuzaki
- Yusuke Koshioka
- Takuto Teranishi
- Genta Matsuda
- Kaito Matsukura
- Naoki Ishikawa

==== Endless Shock 2020 ====
- Koichi Domoto (Koichi)
- Bibari Maeda (the owner)
- Tatsuya Ueda (the rival)
- Ayaka Umeda (Rika)
- Yusuke Matsuzaki
- Yusuke Koshioka
- Takuto Teranishi
- Sho Takada
- Taiga Tsubaki
- Minatio Matsui
- Naoki Ishikawa

==== Endless Shock 2022 ====
- Koichi Domoto
- Hiromitsu Kitayama (the rival)
- Hiroki Koshioka
- Yusuke Matsuzaki
- Sho Takada
- Yoshitaka Hara
- Ritsuki Oohigashi
- Hayato Imamura
- Naoki Ishikawa
- Airi Kisaki (Rika)
- Uta Shimada (the owner and Rika's mother)

==== Endless Shock 2023 ====
- Koichi Domoto: a young entertainer who is always aiming for the top
- Shori Sato (April 9 - May 4) (childhood friend and the rival) (W cast with Hiromitsu Kitayama)
- Hiromitsu Kitayama (May 7 - 31) (childhood friend and the rival) (W-cast with Hiromitsu Sato)
- Hiroki Koshioka
- Yusuke Matsuzaki
- Sho Takada
- Yoshitaka Hara
- Fukada Ryusei
- Kei Adachi
- Reino Nakamura (Rika) She continues to have a single-minded love for Koichi
- Naoki Ishikawa
- Bibari Maeda (April 9 - May 4) (the owner) (*W-cast with Kaho Shimada)
- Kaho Shimada (May 7 - 31) (the owner) (*W cast with Bibari Maeda)

==== Endless Shock 2024 ====
- Koichi Domoto: young up-and-coming entertainer
- Shori Sato (the rival)
- Hiroki Koshioka (Koichi's right-hand man)
- Yusuke Matsuzaki
- Sho Takada
- Takuto Teranishi
- Ryu Matsuo
- Ryusei Ozaki
- Reino Nakamura (Rika)
- Sunao Ishikawa
- Bibari Maeda (April 11 - May 5) (the owner) (*W cast with Kaho Shimada)
- Kaho Shimada (May 7 - 31): Owner (*W cast with Bibari Maeda)

== Endless Shock -Eternal- (2020 - 2024) ==
A spin-off of the original Endless Shock to comply with the prevention of coronavirus. The musical is shortened to 2 hours, and some of the performances are deleted (such as falling down the staircase and some flying).

=== Performance Period ===
- 2020: September 15 - October 12 (Umeda Arts Theater) (31 performances)
- 2021: February 4 - March 31 (Imperial Theatre) (60 performance)
- 2022: April 10 - May 31 (Imperial Theatre) (50 performances)
- 2023: April 9 - May 31 (Imperial Theatre)
- 2024: April 11 - May 31 (Imperial Theatre) (56 performances)

=== Story ===
Three years after Koichi's death, the same members gathered again to mourn Koichi and looked back to what happened during that period.

=== Cast ===
Role	2020	2021	2022	2023	2024
Koichi	Koichi Domoto	Koichi Domoto	Koichi Domoto	Koichi Domoto	Koichi Domoto
Owner	Bibari Maeda	Bibari Maeda	Bibari Maeda	Bibari Maeda	Bibari Maeda
Rival	Tatsuya Ueda	Tatsuya Ueda	Shori Sato	Shori Sato/Hiromitsu Kitayama (W cast)	Shori Sato
Rika	Ayaka Umeda	Ayaka Umeda	Airi Kisaki	Reno Nakamura	Reno Nakamura
others	Yusuke Matsuzaki, Yuki Koshioka, Takuto Teranishi, Sho Takada, Taiga Tsubaki, Minatio Matsui, Naoki Ishikawa				

== "Play within a play" ==
Mainly famous scenes from popular works, including:

- Hamlet
- Richard III
- Romeo and Juliet
- Electra
- The Love Suicides at Sonezaki
- Shinsengumi
- Notre Dame de Paris
- Yotsuya Kaidan
- Chushingura
- Mobydic
- West Side Story

== Musical numbers ==
- Take the 'A' Train
- Carmina Burana
- BROADWAY MELODY

=== Endless Shock ===
- OVERTURE(INST)
  Composition / Arrangement: Sato Yasumasa
- So Feel It Coming
  Lyrics: 3 + 3, Composition: Koichi Domoto, Arrangement: Sato Yasumasa
- NEW HORIZON
  Lyrics: Kubota Youji, Composition: Iida Takehiko, Arrangement: Funayama Motoki
- Yes we can (Yes my dream)
  Lyrics: Koichi Domoto, Composition: Chujo Misa
- ONE DAY
  Lyrics: Shirai Yuuki, Composition / Arrangement: Sato Yasumasa
- DANCING ON BROADWAY
  Lyrics: Hasegawa Masahiro, Composition / Arrangement: Sato Yasumasa
- AMERICA
  Lyrics: 3+3, Composition / Arrangement: Funayama Motoki, Co-arrangement: Chino Yoshihiko
- Love and Loneliness
  Lyrics / Composition: Anders Barren / Nina Woodford / Jany Schel, Arrangement: Funayama Motoki / Japanese lyrics: Shirai Yuuki / Arata Mika
- Solitary
- 花魁 (INST)
  Composition / Arrangement: Sato Yasumasa
- 戦車 (INST)
  Composition / Arrangement:Sato Yasumasa
- 合戦 (INST)
  Composition / Arrangement: Sato Yasumasa
- 死闘 (INST)
  Composition / Arrangement: Sato Yasumasa
- 罠 (INST)
  Composition / Arrangement: Sato Yasumasa
- In the Cemetery
  Lyrics: Kubota Youji, Composition / Arrangement: Iwata Masayuki
- 戻れない日々
  Lyrics: Shirai Yuuki / Arata Mika, Composition: Koichi Domoto
- Why don't you dance with me?
  Lyrics: Shirai Yuuki / Arata Mika, Composition: Koichi Domoto Arrangement: ha-j / Yoshioka Taku
- Higher
  Lyrics: Shirai Yuuki, Composition: Kawada Ruka, Arrangement : Funayama Motoki / 中西裕之
- Flying2 (INST)
  Composition / Arrangement: Sato Yasumasa
- マスク (INST)
  Composition / Arrangement: Sato Yasumasa
- 夜の海
  Lyrics: Shirai Yuuki / Arata Mika, Composition: Koichi Domoto, Arrangement: ha-j / Yoshioka Taku
- 大桜 (INST)
  Composition・Arrangement: Sato Yasumasa
- CONTINUE
  Lyrics: Kubota Youji, Composition: Koichi Domoto, Arrangement: Sho Takada Testuya

== Related products ==
=== DVD / BD ===
- Koichi Domoto Shock Digest (June 19, 2002)
- Koichi Domoto Shock (January 16, 2003) (recording date: June 25th 2002)
- Endless Shock (February 15, 2006) (recording date: February 22nd 2005)
- Endless Shock 2008 (October 29, 2008) (recording date: February 6th 2008)
- Document of Endless Shock 2012 -明日の舞台へ- (February 6, 2013)
- Endless Shock 2012 (September 18, 2013) (recording date: April 21st 2012)
- Endless Shock 1000th Performance Anniversary (September 17, 2014) (recording date: March 23rd 2013 - the 1,001st performance)

=== CD ===
- Koichi Domoto Endless Shock Original Sound Track (January 11, 2006)
- Koichi Domoto Endless Shock Original Sound Track 2 (April 19, 2017)
