= Ōmuta murders =

Gang killings in Japan

The Ōmuta murders (大牟田殺人, Ōmuta Satsujin) were committed by four members of the Kitamura-gumi (北村組), a yakuza gang based in Omuta, Fukuoka, Japan. The Kitamura-gumi was affiliated with the Dojin-kai crime syndicate. The four were sentenced to death for the murder of four people between 18 and 20 September 2004.

== Summary ==
Mami Kitamura had borrowed money from a 58-year-old woman, Sayoko Takami. On 18 September 2004, Mami, her husband and two sons strangled Sayoko and shot her 18-year-old son Tatsuyuki and his 17-year-old friend Junichi Hara. They put the victims in a car, which they dumped into a river. On 20 September, they strangled Sayoko's 15-year-old son Joji, whose half-naked body was found on 21 September. When the police arrested Mami the following day, she confessed to the killing of the other three victims. The police found the car containing the bodies of the three victims in the Suwa River in Omuta.

The other participants in the murders included Mami's husband Jitsuo Kitamura, the leader of Kitamura-gumi; Takashi Kitamura, her son from a previous marriage; and Takahiro Kitamura, her second son. Both Takashi and Takahiro were former sumo wrestlers, known respectively as Kyokuryūjin (旭竜神) and Miikezan (三池山), with the family name Ishibashi. As police were closing in, Jitsuo made an attempt to kill himself with a handgun. Takashi escaped from the police, but was recaptured. Jitsuo insisted that he had committed the murders alone, but the police regarded Mami as the main offender.

They were disruptive during their trials. On 17 October 2006, Mami and Takahiro were sentenced to death. Jitsuo and Takashi were sentenced to death on 28 February 2007. On December 25, the Fukuoka high court upheld the original sentence for Mami and Takahiro, and then Takahiro screamed in the court, "Merry Christmas!" On 27 March 2008, the Fukuoka high court also upheld the original sentence for Jitsuo and Takashi.

=== Takashi Kitamura's Criminal record ===
Takashi Kitamura had a previous conviction for beating an 18-year-old boy with six of his friends with a bokken in June 2000, then dropping him into an irrigation canal and drowning him. For this crime, Takashi was sentenced to three years and six months in prison.

== Popular culture ==
- Waga Ikka Zenin Shikei (我が一家全員死刑) – 2010 book about the murder by Tomohiko Suzuki
  - Death Row Family -2017 film based on the book
