= Mugi Kadowaki =

Japanese actress (born 1992)

- 門脇 麦
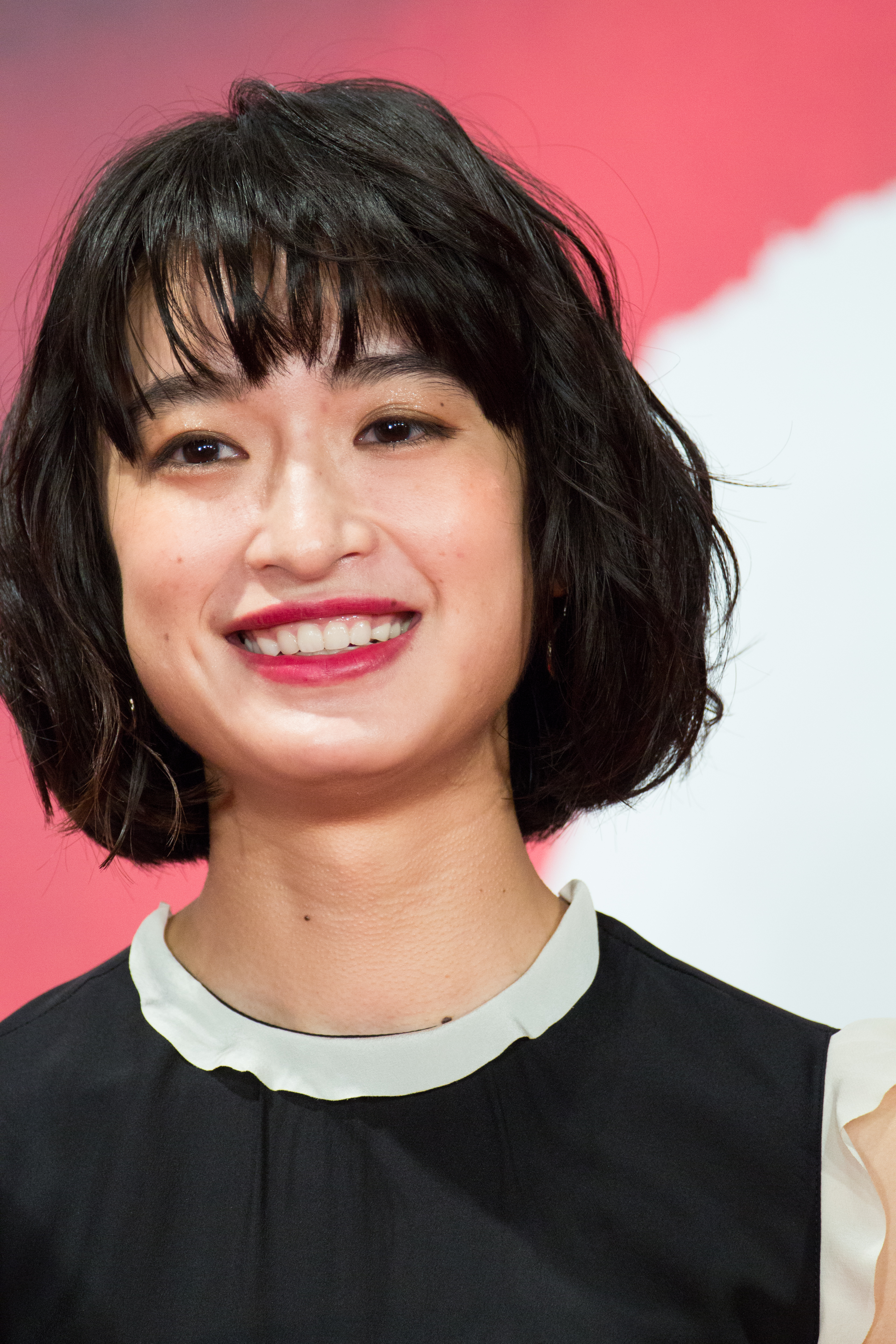
- Kadowaki at the 2017 Tokyo International Film Festival
- Born: 10 August 1992 (age 33); New York, U.S.
- Occupation: Actress
- Years active: 2011–present

Mugi Kadowaki (門脇 麦, Kadowaki Mugi; born 10 August 1992) is a Japanese actress.

== Biography ==
In 2011, Kadowaki debuted in the television drama Misaki Number One!!. At the time of her debut she was signed to Blooming Agency.

In 2013, Kadowaki became a hot topic because of a commercial for "Chocola BB Fe Charge (Eisai)", and appeared in the film School Girl Complex Hōsōbu Hen with Aoi Morikawa. In 2014, she appeared in the film Love's Whirlpool as a college student. The same year, Kadowaki earned her first main role in a drama in NTV's Sailor-fuku to Uchūbito (Alien)〜Chikyū ni Nokotta Saigo no 11-ri〜.

Her special skill was classical ballet, which she had studied for twelve years. During her second year in high school, she realized she had to abandon ballet. She did take advantage of her skills, and appeared in a commercial for Tokyo Gas as a ballerina.

== Filmography ==
=== TV series ===
| Year | Title | Role | Notes | Ref(s) |
|---|---|---|---|---|
| 2013 | Yae's Sakura | Yamamoto Hisae | Taiga drama | |
| 2015 | Mare | Minori Teraoka | Asadora | |
| 2018 | Kiss that Kills | Saiko Satō | | |
| 2020–21 | Awaiting Kirin | Koma | Taiga drama | |
| 2021 | Sekai wo Kaeta Onnanoko | Gabrielle (voice) | Short drama | |
| 2022 | Don't Call It Mystery | Raika | | |
| 2023–26 | Nagatan to Ao to: Ichika no Ryōrichō | Ichika Kuwanoki | Lead role; 2 seasons | |
| 2025 | Himitsu – Top Secret | Yukiko Miyoshi | | |

=== Films ===
| Year | Title | Role | Notes | Ref(s) |
|---|---|---|---|---|
| 2013 | School Girl Complex Hōsōbu Hen | Chiyuki Mitsuzuka | Lead role | |
| 2014 | Love's Whirlpool | College student | | |
| 2015 | Again | Nami Sha | | |
| 2016 | Double Life | Tama | Lead role | |
| 2017 | Her Sketchbook | Mami Konuma | Lead role | |
| 2018 | Dare to Stop Us | Megumi | Lead role | |
| 2019 | Farewell Song | Haru | Lead role | |
| 2021 | Aristocrats | Hanako | Lead role | |
| 2021 | Asakusa Kid | Chiharu | | |
| 2021 | Your Turn to Kill: The Movie | The mysterious woman | | |
| 2022 | The Three Sisters of Tenmasou Inn | Kanae | | |
| 2023 | The Dry Spell | Yuki Koide | | |
| 2023 | Fly On | | Lead role | |
| 2023 | Old Fox | Yang Jun-Mei | | |
| 2024 | Dare to Stop Us 2 | | | |
| 2025 | Blonde | Akasaka | | |
| 2025 | White Flowers and Fruits | | | |
| 2026 | Paris ni Saku Étoile | Olga (voice) | | |
| 2026 | Ghost of Ueno | Satsuki | Lead role | |

== Awards and nominations ==
| Year | Award | Category | Work(s) | Result | Ref. |
|---|---|---|---|---|---|
| 2018 | 42nd Elan d'or Awards | Newcomer of the Year | Herself | Won | |
| 2018 | 31st Nikkan Sports Film Awards | Best Actress | Dare to Stop Us | Nominated | |
| 2019 | 73rd Mainichi Film Awards | Best Actress | Dare to Stop Us | Nominated | |
| 2019 | 61st Blue Ribbon Awards | Best Actress | Dare to Stop Us | Won | |
| 2019 | 28th Tokyo Sports Film Awards | Best Actress | Dare to Stop Us | Nominated | |
| 2019 | Elle Cinema Awards 2019 | Elle Best Actress | Farewell Song and Chiwawa | Won | |
| 2020 | 41st Yokohama Film Festival | Best Actress | Farewell Song | Won | |
| 2022 | 76th Mainichi Film Awards | Best Actress | Aristocrats | Nominated | |
