= 100 Yen Love =

- Poster
- 百円の恋
- Directed by: Masaharu Take
- Screenplay by: Shin Adachi
- Produced by: Gen Sato; Yuji Hiradai; Yoshinori Kano
- Starring: Sakura Ando
- Cinematography: Hiromitsu Nishimura
- Edited by: Chieko Suzaki
- Music by: Shogo Kaida
- Production company: Spotted Productions
- Distributed by: Toei Video
- Release dates: October 25, 2014 (Tokyo); December 20, 2014 (Japan)
- Running time: 113 minutes
- Country: Japan
- Language: Japanese

100 Yen Love (Japanese: 百円の恋, Hepburn: Hyakuen no Koi) is a 2014 Japanese sports drama film directed by Masaharu Take and starring Sakura Ando. The film was released in Japan on December 20, 2014. It was selected as the Japanese entry for the Best Foreign Language Film at the 88th Academy Awards but it was not nominated.

== Plot ==
32-year-old Ichiko lives a self-indulgent and slovenly existence with her parents. Her younger sister Fumiko also lives there, having moved back with her son after her divorce. Within a week, sibling rivalry has led to a physical fight and the mother asks to Ichiko move out. With few opportunities, Ichiko works night shift in a discount store. On her commute home, she passes a boxing gym where she watches Yuji Kano practice, and develops a crush on him. The pair starts seeing each other and her life improves.

== Cast ==
- Sakura Ando as Ichiko Saito
- Hirofumi Arai as Yuji Kano
- Miyoko Inagawa as Keiko
- Saori Koide as Fumiko
- Shohei Uno as Okano
- Tadashi Sakata as Noma
- Hiroki Okita as Sada
- Yōzaburō Itō as Takao
- Osamu Shigematsu as Kinoshita
- Toshie Negishi as Ikeuchi
- Ako Masuki

== Reception ==
=== Critical response ===
100 Yen Love has an approval rating of 100% on review aggregator website Rotten Tomatoes, based on 10 reviews, and an average rating of 8/10.

On Film Business Asia, Derek Elley gave the film a 7 out of 10, calling it "a quirky tale of a social misfit's transformation". Stephen Dalton of The Hollywood Reporter called the film "a powerful portrait of punch-drunk love."

=== Awards and nominations ===
The film won the Japanese Cinema Splash Award at the 27th Tokyo International Film Festival. It was in competition at the 15th Japanese Film Festival Nippon Connection for the Nippon Connection Award and was chosen for third place in the Nippon Cinema Award. At the 88th Kinema Junpo Awards, the film was chosen as the 8th best Japanese film of the year and Sakura Ando won the Award for Best Actress. At the 57th Blue Ribbon Awards, Sakura Ando won the Award for Best Actress. At the 24th Japan Film Professional Awards, the film won the Award for Best Film and Masaharu Take won the Award for Best Director. The film's North American Premiere was presented by North America's largest festival of Japanese cinema, Japan Cuts on July 16, 2015.

== See also ==
- Cinema of Japan
- List of submissions to the 88th Academy Awards for Best Foreign Language Film
- List of Japanese submissions for the Academy Award for Best Foreign Language Film
- YOLO (film), a 2024 Chinese comedic film remake of this film
