= School Girl Complex Hōsōbu Hen =

- Directed by: Yūichi Onuma
- Starring: Aoi Morikawa; Mugi Kadowaki; Maaya Kondō; Aoi Yoshikura; Ayuri Konno; Tsukina Takai
- Release date: August 17, 2013 (Japan)
- Country: Japan
- Language: Japanese

School Girl Complex Hōsōbu Hen (スクールガール・コンプレックス 放送部篇) is a 2013 Japanese film directed by Yūichi Onuma.

== Cast ==
- Aoi Morikawa as Manami
- Mugi Kadowaki as Chiyuki
- Maaya Kondō
- Aoi Yoshikura
- Ayuri Konno
- Tsukina Takai
