= Death Row Family =

2017 Japanese film

Death Row Family (全員死刑) is a 2017 Japanese film directed by Yuki Kobayashi. The film is based on the Ōmuta murders.

== Plot ==
Four members of a family are in debt and struggle financially. They plan to rob a wealthy family who runs a loan shark operation. Due to a reckless plan, they kill one person in the wealthy family. The family goes on to commit more crimes and kill more people.

== Cast ==
- Shotaro Mamiya as Takanori (Tetsuji's son, local gangster)
- Naomasa Musaka as Tetsuji (Yakuza boss)
- Katsuya Maiguma as Takashi (Tetsuji's son, Takanori's big brother)
- Kanako Irie as Naomi (Tetsuji's wife)
- Haduki Shimizu as Kaori (Takanori's lover)
- Motoki Ochiai as Katsuyuki (Yoshida's son)
- Kisetsu Fujiwara as Shoji (Yoshida's son)
- Miyuki Torii as Patra / Ms.Yoshida (Loan shark)
