= You Don't Know Gunma Yet =

Japanese manga series

- Cover of You Don't Know Gunma Yet volume 1 by Shinchosha

お前はまだグンマを知らない (Omae wa Mada Gunma o Shiranai)
- Genre: Comedy
- Manga
- Written by: Hiroto Ida
- Published by: Shinchosha
- Imprint: Bunch Comics
- Magazine: Kurage Bunch
- Original run: October 2013 – May 31, 2019
- Volumes: 11
- Television drama
- Directed by: Itaru Mizuno
- Written by: Shogo Kishida
- Music by: Taro Makido
- Studio: Nippon Television
- Original network: Nippon TV
- Original run: March 6, 2017 – March 27, 2017
- Episodes: 4
- Live-action film
- Directed by: Itaru Mizuno
- Written by: Shogo Kishida
- Music by: Taro Makido
- Studio: Nippon Television; KATSU-do
- Released: July 22, 2017
- Anime television series
- Directed by: Mankyū
- Written by: Mankyū
- Music by: Kyōhei Matsuno
- Studio: Asahi Production
- Licensed by: Crunchyroll
- Original network: Gunma TV, Animax
- Original run: April 2, 2018 – June 18, 2018
- Episodes: 12
- Anime television series

You Don't Know Gunma Yet: Reiwa Version
- Directed by: Tetsuya Tatamitani
- Written by: Tetsuya Tatamitani; Emi Saito; Kohei Nakayama
- Studio: Imagica Infos; Imageworks Studio
- Licensed by: Remow
- Original network: Tetsudō Channel
- Original run: January 10, 2026 – March 14, 2026
- Episodes: 12

You Don't Know Gunma Yet (Japanese: お前はまだグンマを知らない, Hepburn: Omae wa Mada Gunma o Shiranai) is a Japanese manga series written and illustrated by Hiroto Ida. It was serialized online via Shinchosha's Kurage Bunch website form October 2013 to May 2019 and was collected into eleven tankōbon volumes. A 4-episode live-action television series adaptation aired between March 6 and 27, 2017, and a live-action film adaptation was released in July 2017, both starring Shotaro Mamiya. An anime television series adaptation produced by Asahi Production aired from April to June 2018. A new "light anime" television series adaptation produced by Imagica Infos and Imageworks Studio, titled You Don't Know Gunma Yet: Reiwa Version (お前はまだグンマを知らない～令和版～, Omae wa Mada Gunma o Shiranai: Reiwa-ban), aired from January to March 2026.

== Plot ==
Nori Kamitsuki, a high school student who transfers from Chiba Prefecture to a school in Gunma Prefecture after his family relocates. Nori initially looks down on Gunma, viewing it as rural and unsophisticated. However, he is immediately confronted by the region's fiercely proud students, who treat Gunma not as a prefecture but as a sovereign and powerful territory with its own unspoken rules.

Nori becomes embroiled in escalating conflicts with classmates who embody Gunma's extreme local patriotism, including encounters that parody territorial warfare, secret police, and survival trials. As he struggles to adapt, Nori learns the customs, rivalries, and exaggerated dangers associated with life in Gunma, gradually shedding his prejudices.

== Characters ==
Nori Kamitsuki (神月 紀)
Voiced by: Gakuto Kajiwara
Portrayed by: Shotaro Mamiya
Otoya Todoroki (轟 二矢)
Voiced by: Jun Kasama
Kyō "Shinocchi" Shinooka (篠岡 京)
Voiced by: Aya Uchida
Portrayed by: Fumika Baba

== Media ==
=== Anime ===
An anime television series adaptation produced by Asahi Production aired from April 2, to June 18, 2018, on Gunma TV and Animax. The ending theme is "So Happy", performed by Aya Uchida. Crunchyroll streamed the series.

A new "light anime" television series adaptation was announced on October 28, 2025. Titled You Don't Know Gunma Yet: Reiwa Version, the series is produced by AnimationID and animated by Imagica Infos and Imageworks Studio and aired from January 10 to March 14, 2026, on SKY PerfecTV!'s Tetsudō Channel. The theme song is "Jōmo Karuta ~Reiwa-ban" (Jōmo Karuta~Reiwa Version), performed by Masayuki Deguchi. Remow licensed the series for streaming on the "It's Anime" free ad-supported streaming television (FAST) channel on Samsung TV Plus.
