= Heibon Punch (manga) =

Japanese manga series

- First tankōbon volume cover, featuring Mika Wanibuchi (front) and Aki Majima (back)

平凡ポンチ (Heibon Ponchi)
- Genre: Romantic comedy
- Manga
- Written by: George Asakura
- Published by: Shogakukan
- Imprint: Ikki Comix
- Magazine: Monthly Ikki
- Original run: March 25, 2003 – September 24, 2005
- Volumes: 4
- Live-action film
- Directed by: Sakichi Sato
- Released: November 22, 2008
- Runtime: 105 minutes
- icon

Heibon Punch (Japanese: 平凡ポンチ, Hepburn: Heibon Ponchi; lit. 'Ordinary Punch') is a Japanese manga series written and illustrated by George Asakura. It was serialized in Shogakukan's seinen manga magazine Monthly Ikki from March 2003 to September 2005, with its chapters collected in four tankōbon volumes. A live-action film adaptation, directed by Sakichi Sato, premiered in Japan in November 2008.

== Plot ==
Director Aki Majima (真島 アキ, Majima Aki), an independent filmmaker, is on the verge of making his commercial directorial debut when his rival, Eiji Shinkai (新開 エージ, Shinkai Ēji), secures the position instead. Falling into despair, Aki coincidentally encounters Mika Wanibuchi (鰐淵 ミカ, Wanibuchi Mika), a high school girl who aspires to be an actress and claims to be a fan of his work. Drawn to the prospect of filming her, Aki finds himself on the run with Mika after she commits a murder. During their flight, Aki continues to shoot footage, and over the course of their journey, the two gradually develop a mutual attraction.

== Media ==
=== Manga ===
Written and illustrated by George Asakura, Heibon Punch was serialized in Shogakukan's seinen manga magazine Monthly Ikki March 25, 2003, to September 24, 2005. (Note: It finished in the magazine's November 2005 issue, released on September 24 of that same year.) Shogakukan collected its chapters in four tankōbon volumes, released from April 30, 2004, to June 30, 2006.

==== Volumes ====
No.	Japanese release date	Japanese ISBN
1	April 30, 2004	4-09-188451-2
2	August 30, 2004	4-09-188452-0
3	July 29, 2005	4-09-188453-9
4	June 30, 2006	4-09-188324-9

=== Live-action film ===
A live-action film adaptation, directed by Sakichi Sato, premiered in Japan on November 22, 2008. The film was released on DVD on March 25, 2009.
