= Hineno Hironari =

Japanesesamurai

Hineno Hironari (日根野 弘就, 1518 – July 17, 1602) was a Japanese samurai of the Sengoku period through Azuchi–Momoyama period, who served the Oda clan.

He served Saitō Tatsuoki, and later became a monk after Saitō's defeat in 1567.
