= Shotaro Mamiya =

Japanese actor (born 1993)

- 間宮 祥太朗
- Mamiya in 2026
- Born: 11 June 1993 (age 33); Yokohama, Kanagawa Prefecture, Japan
- Occupation: Actor
- Years active: 2008–present
- Agent: Tristone Entertainment Inc.
- Spouse: Unknown (m. 2024)
- Children: 1
- Website: Official Profile

Shotaro Mamiya (間宮 祥太朗, Mamiya Shōtarō; born June 11, 1993) is a Japanese actor. He is represented by Tristone Entertainment.

== Personal life ==
On July 8, 2024, Mamiya announced his marriage to his non-celebrity partner, whom he has been dating for quite some time. Mamiya announced through his agency that his wife had given birth to their first child on May 2, 2025.

== Filmography ==
=== TV dramas ===
Year	Title	Role	Notes	Ref.
2008	Scrap Teacher	Shotaro Hioki		
2013	Public Affairs Office in the Sky	Fleur Vocal	Episode 6	
2014	Nobunaga Concerto	Saitō Tatsuoki	Episode 4	
2014	Time Taxi	Tatsuya	Episode 2	
2014	Water Polo Yankees	Ryo Chiaki		
2014	Baseball Brainiacs	Kei Okaori		
2015	The Girl's Speech	Natsuki Sudo		
2016	Hayako-sensei, Kekkon suru tte Hontōdesuka?	Minatozuke		
2016	The Kodai Family	Shigemasa "Masao" Kōdai Jr.	Lead role	
2016	Mr. Nietzsche in the Convenience Store	Chie Nii (Mr. Nietzsche)	Lead role	
2017	You Don't Know Gunma Yet	Noriko Shinko	Lead role	
2018	BG Personal Bodyguard	Seitarō Sawaguchi		
2018	Half Blue Sky	Ryōji Moriyama	Asadora	
2020–21	Awaiting Kirin	Akechi Hidemitsu	Taiga drama	
2021	Oh My Boss! Love is a Separate Volume	Ryota Nakazawa		
2022	Fight Song	Haruki Ashida		
2022	Nanba MG-5	Tsuyoshi Nanba	Lead role	
2023	Cinderella of Midsummer	Kento Mizushima	Lead role	
2024	Acma: Game	Teruaki Oda	Lead role	
2026	Plastic Beauty	Rui Komiya		
2026	Brothers in Arms	Saizo	Taiga drama	

=== Films ===
Year	Title	Role	Notes	Ref.
2016	Lychee Light Club	Jaibo		
2016	The Kodai Family	Hayato Hakadai		
2016	Ganguro Gals Riot	Takahiro Shibata		
2016	Ushijima the Loan Shark: The Final	Mizoido Sanzo		
2017	Teiichi: Battle of Supreme High	Himuro Roland		
2017	Tori Girl	Daisuke Sakamoto		
2017	Death Row Family	Takanori Kubizuka	Lead role	
2017	You Still Don't Get Gunma	Noriko Shinko	Lead role	
2018	Impossibility Defense	Takeru Kawabata		
2018	Eating Women	Shinozaki		
2019	Hot Gimmick: Girl Meets Boy	Shinogu Narita		
2019	Fly Me to the Saitama			
2019	He Won't Kill, She Won't Die	Rei Kosaka	Lead role	
2020	Shape of Red	Shin Muranushi		
2021	Tokyo Revengers	Tetta Kisaki		
2022	The Broken Commandment	Ushimatsu	Lead role	
2023	Blue Giant	Yukinori Sawabe (voice)		
2023	Tokyo Revengers 2: Bloody Halloween Part 1	Tetta Kisaki		
2023	Tokyo Revengers 2: Bloody Halloween Part 2	Tetta Kisaki		
2023	G-Men	Tsuyoshi Nanba		
2024	In an Isolated Cottage on a Snowy Mountain	Yūichi Honda		
2024	The Floor Plan	Ame-otoko/Amemiya	Lead role	
2024	Acma:Game: The Final Key	Teruaki Oda	Lead role	
2025	Under Ninja	Kato		
2025	Babanba Banban Vampire	Gangster		
2025	Dive in Wonderland	Ko Urai (voice)		
2026	Street Kingdom	Deep		
2026	Bad Lieutenant: Tokyo		American-Japanese film	

=== Stage production ===
Year	Title	Role	Notes	Ref.
2013	Legend of the Galactic Heroes: Uijin: Mō hitotsu no Teki	Reinhard von Müsel		

=== Dubbing ===
Year	Title	Role	Dub for	Notes	Ref.
2016	War & Peace	Andrei Volkonskii	James Norton		

== Awards and nominations ==
Year presented, name of the award ceremony, category, nominee(s) of the award, and the result of the nomination
Year	Award ceremony	Category	Nominated work(s)	Result	Ref.
2022	35th Nikkan Sports Film Awards	Best Actor	The Broken Commandment	Nominated	
2023	47th Elan d'or Awards	Newcomer of the Year	Himself	Won	
