= Mizuki Itagaki =

Japanese actor, singer and fashion model (2000–2025)

- 板垣瑞生
- Born: 25 October 2000; Tokyo, Japan
- Died: c. February 2025 (aged 24); Tokyo, Japan
- Occupations: Actor; singer; fashion model
- Years active: 2011–2025

Mizuki Itagaki (板垣瑞生, Itagaki Mizuki; 25 October 2000 – c. February 2025) was a Japanese actor and singer. From 2014 to 2020, he was a member of the boy band Milk, a part of Stardust Promotion's male musical collective Ebidan.

== Life and career ==
Itagaki was born in Tokyo, Japan on 25 October 2000. At the age of 10, Itagaki was scouted by Stardust Promotion in front of the Statue of Hachikō while he and his mother were on their way home from shopping. He later joined Stardust Promotion's all-male musical collective Ebidan when he was 11 years old. Itagaki appeared in Fujifabric music video as his debut work.

In 2014 he made his movie debut in Dark Gold Ushima-kun Part 2. He also got a major role as Kazuhiko Kambara in Solomon's Perjury, which was released in 2015. In 2014, he was announced as a member of Milk, a sub-group of Ebidan, at Stardust Promotion's Star Festival in November 2014. In November 2015 he appeared in the NHK taiga drama Hana Moyu as Mōri Motoakira.

On 9 March 2024 Stardust Promotion announced that Itagaki's official fan club and social media accounts were closed. On 29 November 2024, Itagaki revealed through his Instagram account that he had been hospitalized in January 2024 for an unspecified mental illness and had decided to quit acting after facing stress and pressure. In the same post, he also revealed that he had developed anorexia and insomnia. However, he also stated that he was transitioning back into his acting career through live-streaming and searching for other talent companies. In another Instagram post on 31 December 2024, Itagaki stated that he was "looking forward" to "new challenges" in 2025.

=== Disappearance and death ===
In late January 2025, Itagaki was reported missing. On 17 April 2025, his family posted on his Instagram account that the police notified them a few days prior that he was found dead in Tokyo. Itagaki's family also stated that he had been suffering from an undisclosed mental illness since 2024. Investigation revealed that he was believed to have died in early February and his body was found in mid-March.

== Filmography ==
=== Film ===
Year	Title	Role	Notes	Ref.
2014	Ushijima the Loan Shark Part 2	Boy D		
2014	Blue Spring Ride	Young Kou Mabuchi		
2015	Solomon's Perjury Part 1: Suspicion	Kazuhiko Kanbara		
2015	Solomon's Perjury Part 2: Judgement	Kazuhiko Kanbara		
2018	Hibiki	Ryōtarō Tsubaki		
2019	Hot Gimmick: Girl Meets Boy	Azusa Odagiri		
2019	Boy Detectives Club Neo			
2019	Love Stoppage Time		Lead role	
2019	Ghost Master	Sakuraba		
2020	Keep Your Hands Off Eizouken!	Ono		
2020	Demon Girl	Ren Aotsuki		
2021	Heartbeats	Yasuhiro Hasebe		
2021	Between Us			
2022	That Disappearance		Filmed in 2018	
2022	The Blue Skies at Your Feet	Yūto Motoyama		
2022	HiGH&LOW THE WORST X	Miyauchi Kozo (Binzo)		
2022	Two Outs Bases Loaded	Hachi		
2023	Our Secret Diary	Hiroto Yano		
2024	Don't Lose Your Head!	Katō Taemon		

=== Television ===
Year	Title	Role	Network	Notes	Ref.
2015	Shuriken Sentai Ninninger	Tetsunosuke Saika the 22nd	TV Asahi		
2015	Burning Flower	Mōri Motoakira	NHK	Taiga drama	
2017–18	Moribito: Guardian of the Spirit	Chagum	NHK	2 seasons	
2020	In-House Marriage Honey	Miura Manatsu	MBS	Lead role	
2020	Yell	Tadashi Shigemori	NHK	Asadora	
2021	Awaiting Kirin	Mori Ranmaru	NHK	Taiga drama	
2022	Hiru	Tetris	Wowow		

=== Dubbing ===
- Safe House, Liam Duke (Joel MacCormack)

== See also ==
- List of solved missing person cases (2020s)
