= Hattori Kazutada =

Hattori Kazutada (服部 一忠, died July, 1595) was a samurai during Sengoku period in Japan. He was also known as Hattori Koheita (服部 小平太) and Hattori Unemenokami (服部 采女正).

Kazutada was born in Owari Province in central Japan. He started out as a page to Oda Nobunaga and fought as a pikeman against Imagawa Yoshimoto during the Battle of Okehazama in 1560. During the battle, Kazutada was the first of Nobunaga's men to mount a personal attack on Imagawa Yoshimoto, but received a sword cut across the legs and was about to be killed when Mōri Yoshikatsu came to his rescue and killed Yoshimoto. He was rewarded by Nobunaga for his role in the victory, but little is known about his subsequent service.

After Nobunaga's assassination, he transferred his allegiance to Toyotomi Hideyoshi and was awarded with lower 5th court rank in 1585. Following the Battle of Odawara in 1590, he was awarded with Matsuzaka Castle in Ise Province, with revenues of 35,000 koku, and was appointed to assist Hideyoshi's proclaimed successor, Toyotomi Hidetsugu. He fought in the Bunroku Campaign in Korea (1592-1593), successfully taking the Korean capital of Seoul. He was subsequently purged with other supporters of Hidetsugu in 1595, and was forced to commit seppuku.
