= Drowning Love =

Japanese shōjo manga series

- Cover of volume 1

溺れるナイフ (Oboreru Knife)
- Genre: Romantic drama, slice of life
- Manga
- Written by: George Asakura
- Published by: Kodansha
- English publisher: Kodansha USA
- Magazine: Bessatsu Friend
- Original run: October 13, 2004 – December 13, 2013
- Volumes: 17
- Manga

Oboreru Knife: Yūgyo no Shizuku Iwa no Yume
- Published: 2012
- Live-action film
- Oboreru Knife

Drowning Love (溺れるナイフ, Oboreru Knife) is a Japanese slice of life romantic drama shōjo manga series written and illustrated by George Asakura and published by Kodansha. The chapters were serialized on Bessatsu Friend from October 13, 2004, to December 13, 2013, and compiled into 17 tankōbon volumes. It was published in French by Delcourt. A live action film adaptation of the same name was released on November 5, 2016. Kodansha USA have licensed the manga and will release it in a digital-only format.

== Volumes ==
- 1 (March 11, 2005)
- 2 (October 13, 2005)
- 3 (April 13, 2006)
- 4 (October 13, 2006)
- 5 (February 13, 2007)
- 6 (July 13, 2007)
- 7 (December 13, 2007)
- 8 (August 10, 2009)
- 9 (January 13, 2010)
- 10 (June 11, 2010)
- 11 (November 12, 2010)
- 12 (May 13, 2011)
- 13 (July 13, 2012)
- 14 (November 13, 2012)
- 15 (May 13, 2013)
- 16 (November 13, 2013)
- 17 (February 13, 2014)

== Reception ==
Volume 8 reached the 4th place on the Oricon weekly manga charts, selling 32,037 copies as of August 16, 2009; volume 9 reached the 23rd place, selling 29,902 copies as of January 17, 2010; volume 12 also reached the 23rd place, with 18,588 copies sold as of May 15, 2011; volume 14 reached the 22nd place, with 27,609 copies sold as of November 18, 2012; volume 15 reached the 40th place, selling 30,738 copies as of May 18, 2013; volume 16 reached the 25th place, selling 23,898 copies as of November 17, 2013; volume 17 reached the 18th place, selling 22,092 copies as of February 16, 2014.
