= Masaharu Take =

Japanese film director (born 1967)

Masaharu Take (武 正晴, Take Masaharu; born 1967 in Chita, Aichi) is a Japanese film director.

Take began working in the film industry without any formal training. Among his first contributions to film productions as an assistant director were Gonin (1995) and Gonin 2 (1996, both directed by Takashi Ishii). After some more years as an assistant director, his first own film as director followed in 2006, Boy Meets Pusan (ボーイ・ミーツ・プサン, Bōi mītsu Pusan). After that he worked for several years as both director and assistant director. An important role model for Take at that time was the director Kazuyuki Izutsu for whom Take worked as assistant director in many films, including Get Up! / Geroppa! in 2003, Break Through! / Pacchigi! in 2005, and Fly with the Gold / Ōgon o daite tobe in 2012.

Take achieved some popularity when his film 100 Yen Love (百円の恋, Hyakuen no koi, 2014) was submitted for the 88th Academy Awards as Best Foreign Language Film (though ultimately not nominated). For Take, this honour came as a surprise, as he himself said. 100 Yen Love is about a woman working as a shop assistant in a 100-yen shop who takes up boxing. In 2017, Take revisited the theme of combat sport in The Ringside Story (リングサイド・ストーリー, Ringusaido sutōrī), a film about wrestling.

The Gun (銃, Jū) from 2018 is Take's first and to date only film for which he also wrote the script. It is based on Fuminori Nakamuras debut novel of the same title from 2002. The Gun is about a university student who accidentally comes into possession of a handgun. In a review, a critic compared the film to Japanese New Wave cinema and Nagisa Ōshima, and praised the performance of main actor Nijirō Murakami. Another critic praised the film for illustrating the phantasmatic nature of the phallus and the role it plays within male subjectivity.

In 2019, Take directed a television series for the first time (The Naked Director). His 2018 film We Make Antiques (嘘八百, Uso happyaku) was so successful that a sequel followed in 2020, also directed by Take.

As his influences and personal favourites, Take names the directors Yūzō Kawashima, Martin Scorsese and the aforementioned Kazuyuki Izutsu, as well as actress Ayako Wakao.
