= George Asakura =

Japanese manga artist

- Born: May 11, 1974 (age 52)
- Area: manga
- Awards: 2005 Kodansha Manga Award for shōjo manga

George Asakura (Japanese: ジョージ朝倉, Hepburn: Jōji Asakura; born May 11, 1974) is a Japanese manga artist. She took her pen name from one of the title characters in Gatchaman and made her debut in 1995 with Punky Cake Junkie, which was published in the magazine Bessatsu Friend DX Juliet. She is best known for A Perfect Day for Love Letters, for which she received the 2005 Kodansha Manga Award for shōjo manga, and Knock Your Heart Out! A Perfect Day for Love Letters was adapted as a live-action movie and has been licensed in English by Del Rey Manga.

Asakura is known for her unconventional style and storytelling, which often focuses on introspective, everyday themes. Her past works include Shōnen Shōjo Romance, Bara Ga Saita, Suimitsuto No Yoru, Happy End (published by Kodansha), Heart wo Uchinomese, Piece of Cake, Karaoke Baka Ichidai (published by Shodensha), Heibon Punch (published by Shogakukan), Oboreru Knife ("The Drowning Knife", published by Kodansha), and TEKE TEKE★RENDEZ-VOUS (published by Shodensha). Her current series is Dance Dance Danseur (published by Shogakukan).

In the afterword to A Perfect Day for Love Letters volume 2, she says her arms are long but her legs are short, and complains about her appearance by drawing herself as male. She also claims "I can eat everything. I have no sense of taste. Tone deaf. I have no sense of direction. I'm uncoordinated at sports." Her favorites foods include coffee with milk in it, cream cheese and dairy products, and natto.
