= Love's Whirlpool (2014 film) =

Japanese film about group sexual activity based on award-winning play

- Poster
- 愛の渦
- Directed by: Daisuke Miura
- Screenplay by: Daisuke Miura
- Based on: Ai no Uzu by Daisuke Miura
- Produced by: Makoto Fujimoto; Makoto Okada; Toshiki Kimura
- Starring: Sosuke Ikematsu; Mugi Kadowaki; Kenichi Takitō; Eriko Nakamura; Hirofumi Arai
- Cinematography: Sawako Ohzu
- Edited by: Zensuke Hori
- Music by: Shogo Kaida
- Production companies: THE KLOCKWORX; Toei Video Company; Stairway
- Distributed by: Toei Company
- Release date: March 1, 2014 (Japan)
- Running time: 123 minutes
- Country: Japan
- Language: Japanese

Love's Whirlpool (Japanese: 愛の渦, Hepburn: Ai no Uzu) is a 2014 Japanese erotic romantic drama film directed by Daisuke Miura. The film was adapted from Miura's own award-winning play of the same name, and portrays a group of men and women who pay to come to a common location to take part in organized promiscuous sexual activity. It was released in Japan on March 1, 2014.

== Plot ==
The entire film is in located in a high-rise residential building in Roppongi, Japan where four anonymous men and four anonymous women pay to enter an anonymous sex club. At the beginning of the night the owner comes out and lets them know that they will have from midnight until 5:00 A.M. to continue whatever sexual activities they desire. The rules include showering every time after sex and using the restroom, condoms must be worn at all times, and men must respect the wishes of the women.

When the owner leaves, they are left in silence to continue spending the night as they wish in sexual activity. After the clerk/bartender leaves to get snacks, the men and women slowly begin small talk amongst themselves until the Freeter finally propositions the office lady to go downstairs. From here the remaining men and women slowly paired: the salaried man with the kindergarten teacher, the NEET with the college student, and the factory worker with the regular customer. Despite her timid nature, the college student is revealed to have a powerful hidden sex drive, while the factory worker is revealed to have been a virgin up until this night.

After everyone has had their first round downstairs the men and women open up more to conversation, while the clerk returns with sex toys to be freely used for the rest of the night. As the characters begin to expose their darker secrets, the salary man reveals to be cheating on his wife and the kindergarten teacher reveals to have had sexual fantasies of one of her students. As some of the men and women begin switching partners, the NEET and the college student begin showing a deeper attraction to each other beyond lust. The factory worker, on the other hand, is left to continue pairing up with the regular customer, as neither of them are desired by the other men and women. After more sessions downstairs, the freeter expresses interest in pairing up with the college student based on her energetic passion in bed, but the NEET tries to stop them, to which the freeter asks him if he loves her. Admitting that he does not, the NEET subdues and withdraws, leaving the others to pair up as they choose. However, the scene cuts to show a couple who have joined the others in the living room, creating an awkward silence once again amidst the group. After strong encouragement from her boyfriend, the couple woman propositions and partners up with the NEET, while the couple man pairs up with the college student. Both the college student and the NEET are shown watching each other during their separate intercourse, further implying their growing attraction towards each other. Frustrated with his girlfriend's passion in bed with the NEET, the couple man becomes frustrated with her, explaining how this was a test of their love and she should not have genuinely enjoyed it, and both leave for the rest of the night.

As the night continues, the men and women continue to pair up, with the NEET and college student together once again. After assembling back upstairs, the group appears to be all together again until loud noises are heard downstairs. Re-assembling downstairs, the group applaud upon finding the factory worker and regular customer actively finishing up, with the regular customer proclaiming to have just had the best sex she has ever had, much to the satisfaction of the factory worker.

As 5 A.M. draws the night to a close, the clerk opens the blinds, letting in a blinding white light on the characters. Now under the light, the women shyly put their clothes back on away from the men while the men silently re-dress. When the college student loses her phone, the clerk uses the NEET's phone to call her, accidentally giving him her number. The owner comes downstairs to inform the men that they are required to give the women 15 minutes to leave before they may leave themselves, in order to discourage stalking, and it is revealed that the regular customer and him are in a relationship. After leaving, the NEET receives a text to meet up with the college student, and proceeds to happily meet her at a cafe. The college student, however, asks him to delete her number, claiming that she was not herself that night, and that they cannot see each other again. The film concludes with the college student sitting with her friends at school, while the clerk cleaning up at the club receives a picture message of his newborn child.

=== Adaptation ===
The movie is based on the novel “Ai no Uzu” by Daisuke Miura which was published in 1996. The storyline was formerly written as a stage play and first performed in 2005.

== Cast ==
- Sosuke Ikematsu as NEET
- Mugi Kadowaki as College student
- Kenichi Takitō as Salaried man
- Eriko Nakamura as Child care teacher
- Hirofumi Arai as Freeter
- Yoko Mitsuya as Office lady
- Ryusuke Komakine as Factory worker
- Muck Akazawa as Regular customer
- Tokio Emoto as Couple man
- Yōsuke Kubozuka as Clerk
- Tetsushi Tanaka as Shop manager

== Themes ==
=== Gender roles ===
In Love's Whirlpool, the men and women are sexualized relatively equally, challenging Laura Mulvey's "male gaze" theory which claims that cinema objectifies women through the empowered eyes of the male lens. By requiring the male characters to respect the wishes and consent of the women when propositioning for sex, it is shown that this is not a sex house for men alone but for the equal pleasure of both men and women searching for sex. This equal sexualization also challenges common Asian stereotypes in cinema, including the hyper-sexualization of Asian women and the desexualization of Asian men, with the naked bodies of both men and women equally portrayed throughout the film.

=== Human interaction ===
In the film these primary four men and four women characters come together and are a faced with an immense amount of pressure at the beginning of their encounter, with long pauses of awkward silence precluding small talk. After the women begin casually conversing amongst themselves, the men one by one drag themselves nonchalantly to be included. Although everyone is solely here to have sex, it still takes a while before any of the characters can make their way up to instigating intercourse and selecting a partner. In many societies and other communities sex is seen as a very intimate and personal act, but here in the film there is no connection between the men and women, so because of this initial lack of a bond of attraction or connection, it naturally takes the group a long amount of time to finally start. In the beginning of the film the characters' bodies are largely obscured during intercourse, but as the characters developed and began to open up more with each other the sexual scenes in the film became more graphic as well. Thus, the character development parallels the revealing nature of their sexual encounters.

Critic Christopher Bourne writes in his review that, "The sex is visually discreet at first, but as the night goes on and more details about the characters are revealed during the course of the film, the encounters become gradually more revealing, both physically and emotionally," explaining how this gradual exposure culminates in one of the film's most striking shots, showing a circling bird's eye view of all eight characters during simultaneous intercourse.

=== Japanese cultural reflection ===
The film shows a revealing look at Fuzoku, the Japanese sex industry, which has been embedded as one of the major Japanese subcultures for a long history. As Mark Schilling has mentioned in his work, ‘Ai no Uzu (Love’s Whirlpool): Searching for meaning in the meaningless sex,’ in Japan, the culture of sex industry is constructed with two reaches. In the first and lower reaches of the industry, “Sex is regarded as a service to be offered in defined ways for specified times.” In this regard, sex is more utilized and considered as a type of business, where the level of emotional change is low, and the extent of psychological interaction is limited. However, in the upper reaches of this industry, a deeper interaction between human relations is needed in this context. Upon this reaches, “Love is suggested and even promised, but the adage ‘no money, no honey’ still applies.” The film Love’s Whirlpool has revealed the relationship between those two reaches of Japan's sex industry in a holistic approach.

The film begins by illustrating the industry's lower reaches, in which four men and four women all pay to join an anonymous sex party in a high-rise building in Roppongi. In this organized sexual activity, sex was required by all participants, but love was forbidden. However, as the film progresses and each of the characters begin to reveal more about themselves, the film was then transformed from the first stage to the second stage - the industry's upper reaches.

== Distribution ==
- 2014 (18th) Puchon International Fantastic Film Festival, July 17–27, 2014
- 2014 (9th) Japan Cuts, July 10–20, 2014
- 2014 San Diego Asian Film Festival, November 6–15, 2014
