= Mōri Yoshikatsu =

Mōri Yoshikatsu (毛利 良勝; died June 21, 1582) was a vassal under Oda Nobunaga during Japan's Sengoku period. He was also known as Mōri Shinsuke (毛利 新助 or 毛利 新介) and Mōri Shinsaemon (毛利 新左衛門).

In 1560, he participated in the Battle of Okehazama on Nobunaga's side and assisted Hattori Kazutada after he was injured. Later, he accompanied Nobunaga and his son Oda Nobutada to Kyoto and died with Nobutada during the Incident at Honnō-ji.
