= Miki Aihara =

Japanese manga artist

- Born: June 10; Shizuoka, Japan
- Occupation: Manga artist
- Known for: Hot Gimmick
- Website: http://www.mikiniki.net

Miki Aihara (相原実貴, Aihara Miki) (born June 10 in Shizuoka, Japan) is a Japanese shojo manga artist best known for creating the manga series Hot Gimmick. She debuted with Lip Conscious! in Betsucomi. Aihara frequently serialized her series in Betsucomi but has had her works serialized in Cheese! in the past several years. Although none of Aihara's series have been adapted into anime, Hot Gimmick has received two drama CDs, a light novel spinoff titled Hot Gimmick S and a live-action film adaptation, while From Five to Nine has been adapted into a live-action television drama.

== Works ==
A † indicates the work has been published in English.

=== Series ===
Year	Title	Volumes	Magazine	Notes
1994	Atashi ni Tsuiterasshai (あたしについてらっしゃい)	1	Betsucomi	
1994	Oyani wa Naisho (親にはナイショ)	2	Betsucomi	
1995-6	Tokyo Boys & Girls† (東京少年少女, Tōkyō Shōnen Shōjo)	5	Betsucomi	
1996-8	So Bad!	6	Betsucomi	
1998	Sora ni Taiyou ga Arukagiri. (空に太陽がある限りっ。)	3	Betsucomi	A bonus chapter was included in the 2003 oneshot anthology Sweet: Torokechau Koimonogatari (Sweet - トロけちゃう恋物語).
1999-2000	Seiten Taisei (青天大晴)	6	Betsucomi	
2000-5	Hot Gimmick† (ホットギミック)	12	Betsucomi	
2004	Sensei no Okiniiri! (先生のお気に入り！)	1	Cheese!	
2006	Oujisama no Kanojo (王子様の彼女)	1	Betsucomi	
2006	Zoku Sensei no Okiniiri! (続・先生のお気に入り！)	1	Cheese!	Sequel to Sensei no Okiniiri!
2006-9	Honey Hunt† (ハニーハント)	6	Cheese! (Japan) Shojo Beat (United States)	Aihara's first, and so far only, series to be serialized in a magazine outside Japan. Has not officially ended, but is currently on hiatus.
2010–20	From Five to Nine (5時から9時まで, 5-ji Kara 9-ji Made)	16	Cheese!	5-ji Kara 9-ji Made concluded in the May 2020 edition of Cheese.

=== Oneshots ===
Year	Title	Magazine	Notes
1991	Lip Conscious! (Lip・コンシャス!)	Betsucomi	
1994	Shirayukihime '94 (白雪姫'94)	Betsucomi	
2004	10 Days† (10日間, 10 Kakan)	Betsucomi	
2006	Getsuyoubi ga Machidoshii (月曜日が待ち遠しい)	Big Comic Spirits	Aihara's first, and so far only, seinen manga.

=== Other ===
Year	Title	Notes
2005	Hot Gimmick S† (ホットギミックS)	A light novel spinoff of Hot Gimmick written by Megumi Nishizaki. Aihara only did the illustrations.
2008	Aihara Miki: The Best Selection (相原実貴The Best Selection)	Part of the Best Selection series. Each instalment in the series is a collection of oneshots by a famed shojo mangaka who mainly serializes their works in Shogakukan magazines.
