= Fumika Baba =

Japanese actress and model (born 1995)

- 馬場 ふみか
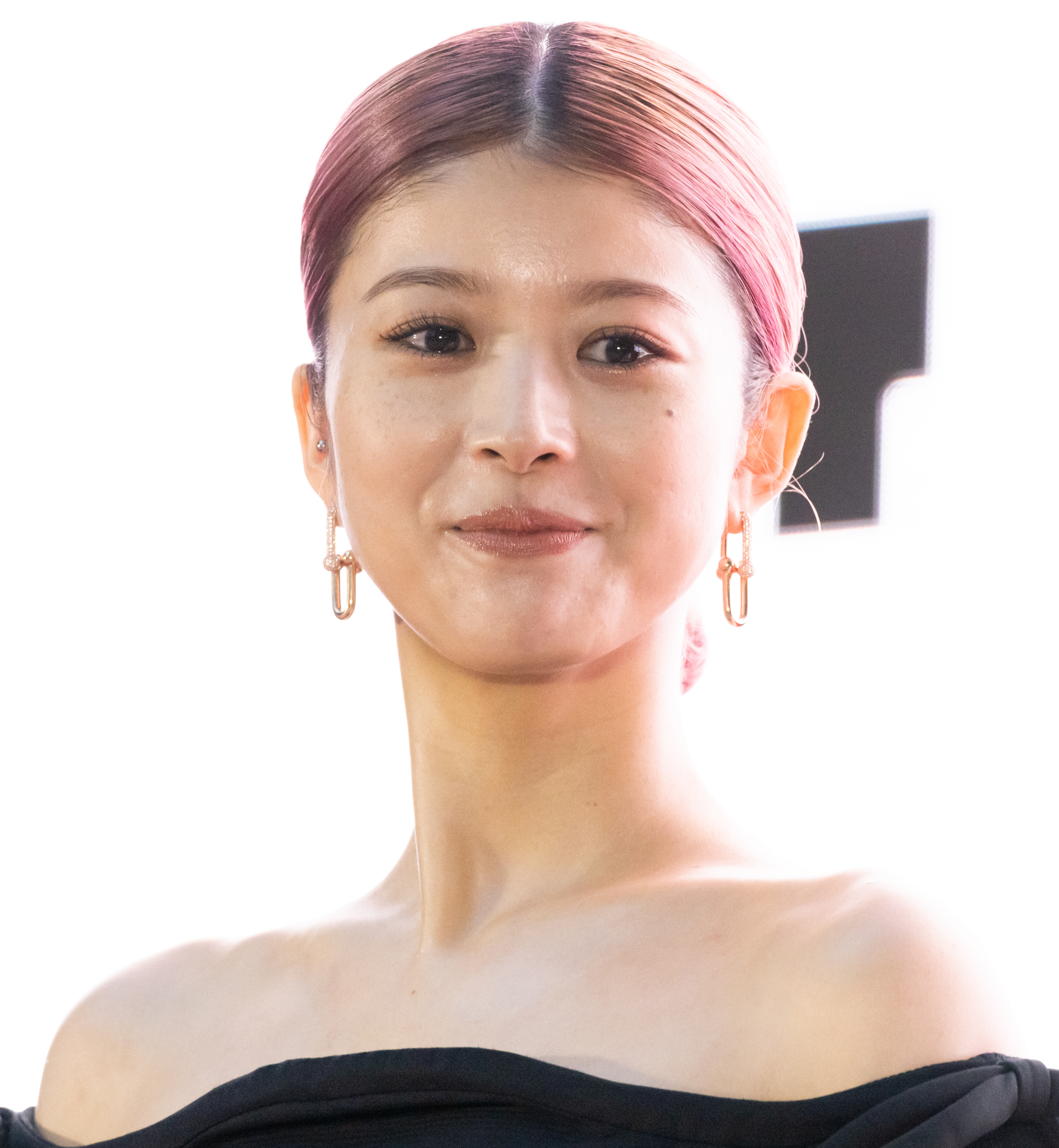
- Baba at the 2022 Tokyo International Film Festival
- Born: June 21, 1995 (age 31); Niigata, Japan
- Occupations: Actress; model
- Years active: 2014–present
- Agent: Name Management

Fumika Baba (馬場 ふみか, Baba Fumika; born June 21, 1995) is a Japanese actress and model. She was scouted on a local street when she was in high school, and started working as a model for the local free newspaper, Niigata Bishōjo Zukan. Baba was also part of a young performers troupe called Apricot.

Baba made her acting debut in the 2014 film Puzzle, and won the Yokohama Film Festival's Best Newcomer Award in 2023 for her performance in Love is Light. She has expressed her admiration for the actress Fumi Nikaidō.

== Filmography ==
=== Film ===
Year	Title	Role	Notes	Ref.
2014	Puzzle	Sayaka	Debut	
2015	Kamen Rider Drive: Surprise Future	Medic		
2015	Kamen Rider × Kamen Rider Ghost & Drive: Super Movie War Genesis	Medic / Medic Roidmude		
2016	Ganguro Gals Riot	Miu	Lead role	
2017	Revenge Girl	Mariko		
2018	Kuso-yarō to Utsukushiki Sekai	Fujiko		
2019	Life on the Longboard: 2nd Wave	Mika Kudō		
2020	Threads: Our Tapestry of Love	Yumi Gotō		
2020	Awake	Shiori Isono		
2022	Love Is Light	Yadorigi		
2022	Violence Action			
2022	Tyida	Madoka Takahashi	Lead role	
2023	In Her Room	Miyako		
2023	Corpo a Corpo	Yuri	Lead role	
2024	Rude to Love	Nao		
2025	Love Doesn't Matter to Me	Miyabi Enaga		

=== Television series ===
Year	Title	Role	Notes	Ref.
2014	Kamen Rider Drive	Medic / Medic Roidmude / Misuzu Hatori		
2017	You Don't Know Gunma Yet	Kyo Shinooka		
2017	Final Fantasy XIV: Dad of Light	Yoko Shoda		
2017	Kaiju Club	Yuriko		
2017	Code Blue Season 3	Futaba Yukimura		
2017	Shimokitazawa Die Hard	Miwa	Episode 8	
2017	Love and Hong Kong	Aya Hirakawa		
2018	The Confidence Man JP	Yuki Sudo	Episode 3	
2018	Code Blue: Another Everyday	Futaba Yukimura		
2018	The Guide to Late Night Bad Love	Madoka Koga	Lead role	
2019	Queen	Anri Shiraishi		
2019	Secret Unrequited Love	Teru Uehara		
2019	Is It A Lily?	Yuri Shinohari	Lead role	
2019	Nameless Revenge Zegen	Li Xue Lan		
2019	Please Do Not Attempt, Never	Iijima		
2019	Hey Sensei, Don't You Know?	Hana Aoi	Lead role	
2020	Love Distance	Anna		
2020	The Way of the Househusband	Lisa	Episode 8	
2021	The 3Bs You Shouldn't Date	Haru Kobayashi	Lead role	
2022	Short Program	Michiko	Episode 7	
2022	Involvement in Family Affairs	Arisa Miyama (Kagawa)		
2022	Dangerous Lover	Yuri		
2023	Giver Taker	Satomi Tsuyama		
2025	Beside the Hearth at Alice-san's House	Alice Minase	Lead role	

== Awards ==
Year	Award	Category	Work(s)	Result	Ref.
2023	44th Yokohama Film Festival	Best Newcomer	Love Is Light	Won	
