= Tokyo Boys & Girls =

Japanese manga series

- The cover of the first manga volume from the 2003 Japanese shinsōban release

東京少年少女 (Tōkyō Shōnen Shōjo)
- Genre: Comedy, romance
- Manga
- Written by: Miki Aihara
- Published by: Shogakukan
- English publisher: NA: Viz Media
- Imprint: Flower Comics
- Magazine: Bessatsu Shōjo Comic
- Original run: 1994 – 1996
- Volumes: 5

Tokyo Boys & Girls (Japanese: 東京少年少女, Hepburn: Tōkyō Shōnen Shōjo) is a Japanese shōjo manga series written and illustrated by Miki Aihara. It was serialized in Shogakukan's Bessatsu Shōjo Comic magazine, starting in 1994. Shogakukan later collected the individual chapters into five bound volumes from March 1995 to June 1996. Viz Media licensed the series for an English-language release in North America and published five volumes, from July 2005 to July 2006.

== Plot ==
Mimori Kosaka is accepted into Meidai Attached High School, which is her dream school because of its fashionable uniforms. Mimori dreams of being cute and feminine and finding a boyfriend in high school. Although Mimori looks forward to enjoying her first year of high school, things do not go as planned. After befriending a girl named Nana, Mimori reunites with her childhood friend, Haruta. However, instead of being friendly towards Mimori, Haruta is seeking revenge against her. A love triangle also develops when Nana falls in love with Kazukita Kuniyasu, who is in love with Mimori. As Mimori only likes Haruta, things get complicated.

== Characters ==
Mimori Kosaka (香坂美森, Kōsaka Mimori)
The heroine of the story and a classmate of Haruta Atsushi in elementary school. She fell in love with Haruta when they reunited in high school.
Haruta Atsushi (暑しはるた, Atsushi Haruta)
The hero of the story and a classmate of Mimori when they were in elementary school. He was known as 'Haru-chan' in elementary school since he looked like a girl back then. He also developed feelings for Mimori. Haruta becomes jealous when another boy gives Mimori his button at their graduation ceremony, and he believes he was betrayed by Mimori. After that, Haruta became a delinquent and changed his look after being "rejected" by Mimori. It is hinted that he likes Mimori because when she cuts her finger and Kuniyasu sucks her finger to relieve her pain, he gets mad at him.
Nana Takaichi (高市七, Takaichi Nana)
Mimori's first friend in high school. She has been a very popular girl amongst the boys in school since junior high. She is madly in love with Kuniyasu and once dated a college student.
Kuniyasu Kazukita (数北国安, Kazukita Kuniyasu)
A brainy and popular student who is also a playboy. Mimori is the first girl that he had actually fallen in love with, and he tries everything to make Mimori like him.
Ran Shingyogi (寝具宵らん, Shingyogi Ran)
A friend of Kuniyasu since junior high. He is in love with Nana and tries very hard to win her heart.

== Volumes ==
No.	Original release date	Original ISBN	English release date	English ISBN
1	March 1995	978-4-09-136381-7	July 5, 2005	978-1-42-150020-1
2	May 1995	978-4-09-136382-4	October 4, 2005	978-1-42-150021-8
3	September 1995	978-4-09-136383-1	January 3, 2006	978-1-42-150202-1
4	January 1996	978-4-09-136384-8	April 4, 2006	978-1-42-150400-1
5	June 1996	978-4-09-136385-5	July 5, 2006	978-1-42-150589-3
