= The King's Beast =

Japanese manga series

- Cover of the first volume

王の獣 (Ō no Kemono)
- Genre: Adventure; Fantasy; Romance
- Manga
- Written by: Rei Toma
- Published by: Shogakukan
- English publisher: NA: Viz Media
- Magazine: Cheese!
- Original run: January 24, 2019 – January 24, 2025
- Volumes: 18
- Other
- Dawn of the Arcana

The King's Beast (Japanese: 王の獣, Hepburn: Ō no Kemono) is a Japanese manga series written and illustrated by Rei Toma. Set in the same world as Toma's previous work Dawn of the Arcana, the series was serialized in Shogakukan's Cheese! magazine from January 2019 to January 2025, with the series' individual chapters collected into eighteen volumes.

== Characters ==
Ko Rangetsu (胡 藍月)
Voiced by: Mariya Ise (voice comic)
Tenyou (天輝, Tenyō)
Voiced by: Kaito Ishikawa (voice comic)
Taihaku (太博)
Voiced by: Yuma Uchida (voice comic)
Reiun (麗雲)
Voiced by: Yuichi Nakamura (voice comic)
Youbi (謡尾, Yōbi)
Voiced by: Ayumu Murase (voice comic)

== Media ==
=== Manga ===
Written and illustrated by Rei Toma, the series was serialized in Shogakukan's Cheese! magazine from January 24, 2019, to January 24, 2025. Shogakukan published the series' individual chapters in eighteen tankōbon volumes.

In July 2020, Viz Media announced that they licensed the series for English publication. On May 9, 2023, Viz Media launched their Viz Manga digital manga service, with the series' chapters receiving simultaneous English publication in North America as they are released in Japan.

The series is also licensed in Indonesia by Elex Media Komputindo.

==== Volume list ====
| No. | Original release date | Original ISBN | English release date | English ISBN |
|---|---|---|---|---|
| 1 | September 26, 2019 | 978-4-09-870627-3 | February 2, 2021 | 978-1-9747-2054-5 |
| 2 | September 26, 2019 | 978-4-09-870628-0 | May 4, 2021 | 978-1-9747-2062-0 |
| 3 | January 24, 2020 | 978-4-09-870798-0 | August 3, 2021 | 978-1-9747-2081-1 |
| 4 | June 10, 2020 | 978-4-09-871002-7 | November 2, 2021 | 978-1-9747-2302-7 |
| 5 | September 25, 2020 | 978-4-09-871080-5 | February 1, 2022 | 978-1-9747-2303-4 |
| 6 | February 25, 2021 | 978-4-09-871252-6 | May 3, 2022 | 978-1-9747-2904-3 |
| 7 | June 25, 2021 | 978-4-09-871322-6 | August 2, 2022 | 978-1-9747-2905-0 |
| 8 | October 26, 2021 | 978-4-09-871511-4 | November 1, 2022 | 978-1-9747-3393-4 |
| 9 | February 25, 2022 | 978-4-09-871576-3 | February 7, 2023 | 978-1-9747-3623-2 |
| 10 | June 24, 2022 | 978-4-09-871645-6 | May 2, 2023 | 978-1-9747-3857-1 |
| 11 | October 26, 2022 | 978-4-09-871838-2 | October 3, 2023 | 978-1-9747-4068-0 |
| 12 | March 24, 2023 | 978-4-09-871895-5 | March 5, 2024 | 978-1-9747-4368-1 |
| 13 | July 26, 2023 | 978-4-09-872253-2 | June 4, 2024 | 978-1-9747-4637-8 |
| 14 | December 26, 2023 | 978-4-09-872449-9 | December 3, 2024 | 978-1-9747-4983-6 |
| 15 | April 25, 2024 | 978-4-09-872633-2 | May 6, 2025 | 978-1-9747-5491-5 |
| 16 | August 26, 2024 | 978-4-09-872761-2 | September 2, 2025 | 978-1-9747-5843-2 |
| 17 | February 26, 2025 | 978-4-09-873012-4 | February 3, 2026 | 978-1-9747-6151-7 |
| 18 | July 25, 2025 | 978-4-09-873092-6; 978-4-09-943205-8 (SE) | July 7, 2026 | 978-1-9747-6585-0 |

=== Other media ===
A voice comic adaptation was released on the Flower Comics YouTube channel on June 24, 2021. It featured the voice performances of Mariya Ise, Kaito Ishikawa, Yuma Uchida, Yuichi Nakamura, Ayumu Murase.

An official fan book was released on July 25, 2025.

== Reception ==
Rebecca Silverman from Anime News Network praised the story and use of silent panels, though she felt that some of the characters were too similar. Danica Davidson from Otaku USA praised the story and artwork. John C. Smith from Comic Book Resources praised the artwork and characters, though he felt the story shared many similarities to other shōjo manga. Gina DiGiovancarlo, also from Comic Book Resources, likened the series' storytelling to that of the Chinese folk tale Mulan.

In 2022, the series was nominated for the 68th Shogakukan Manga Award in the shōjo manga category.

Upon the release of the series' final volume on the 25th of July 2025, the publisher reported that the series had sold over 4 million copies. To commemorate this achievement, Shogakukan released both a special B5-sized edition of the final 18th volume and an official fanbook alongside the mass market edition of volume 18.

== See also ==
- The Water Dragon's Bride, another manga series by the same creator
