= Honey Hunt =

Japanese manga series

- English cover of the first manga volume

ハニーハント (Hanīhanto)
- Genre: Romance
- Manga
- Written by: Miki Aihara
- Published by: Shogakukan
- English publisher: NA: Viz Media
- Magazine: Cheese!
- English magazine: NA: Shojo Beat
- Original run: December 22, 2006 – 2009 (hiatus)
- Volumes: 6
- Manga

Ore wa Idol wo Yametai
- Written by: Miki Aihara
- Published by: Shogakukan
- Magazine: Cheese!
- Original run: December 22, 2023 – present

Honey Hunt (ハニーハント, Hanīhanto) is a Japanese manga series written and illustrated by Miki Aihara. The series began serialization in the manga magazine Cheese! in December 2006, with the first tankobon published on June 26, 2007, and the latest volume, the 6th volume, on December 24, 2009. A spin-off manga, titled Ore wa Idol wo Yametai, began serialization in the same magazine on December 22, 2023.

Honey Hunt is licensed for English language publication in North America by Viz Media. It premiered in Viz's monthly manga anthology Shojo Beat in the September 2008 issue. The first volume was published on April 7, 2009. In 2009, Honey Hunt went on hiatus.

== Plot ==
Quiet and unassuming Yura Onozuka lives in the shadow of her famous parents - Yukari, a beautiful and talented actress, and Takayuki, the first Japanese composer to win an Academy Award. When Yukari coldly announces that she and Takayuki are getting divorced, and Yura learns that Yukari has been sleeping with her best friend and crush, Shinsuke, Yura feels abandoned and left alone by everyone around her.

Yura decides to become an actress with the goal of becoming better than Yukari so that she can show everyone that she is worth something as an individual, and not be judged as a disappointment because she is continuously compared to her parents. Keiichi Mizorogi, a professional manager formerly employed by Takayuki, scouts Yura and aids her in her quest.

Yura gradually develops the confidence to land the lead role in an upcoming television drama series. Along the way, she also gains the interest of two rising male idols - composer Q-Ta Minamitani, who first meets Yura when she is running away from her hotel during her parents' divorce, and his twin brother Haruka, a member of popular band Knights and the male lead of the drama Yura will star in.

== Characters ==
Yura Onozuka (小野塚 ゆら, Onozuka Yura)
The protagonist of the series, Yura is a quiet and unassuming third-year high schooler. She is used to people trying to get close to her because of her famous parents. She is betrayed by her neighbor, best friend, and first love, Shinsuke, who she thought was the only one on her side, when she learns he is sleeping with Yukari. With some help from others, she decides to embark into the entertainment industry to get back at Yukari. As Yura follows through with her journey as an actress, it is then when her previously unknown potential becomes evident.
Yukari Shiraki (白木 紫, Shiraki Yukari)
Yukari is Yura's mother, a talented actress whose beauty conceals a selfish and cold personality. Though she publicly says that she and Yura are close and often spend time together, she is rarely at home and is very distant toward her daughter. She and her husband have mutually agreed to remain together only for their careers and divorce only when their extramarital affairs are exposed. She expresses no interest in being Yura's mother and belittles Yura's efforts to become an actress. It is eventually revealed that Yukari actually loves Takayuki and had been confident in her own beauty. After Yura's birth, Yukari became extremely jealous of how Takayuki gave all his attention to their daughter. She began to emotionally invest in remaining beautiful so that her daughter would never upstage her. When Takayuki only wanted to bring Yura with him to New York, Yukari is deeply hurt and prevented him from taking Yura. She extends her efforts to keep Takayuki away from his daughter by lying to Yura that her father stayed away from home because he hated Yura.
Keiichi Mizorogi (溝呂木 恵一, Mizorogi Keiichi)
Keiichi Mizorogi is Yura's manager, who used to manage her father. He is young, but he knows what he's doing as a manager. He knows show business like the back of his hand, and has the big production company, "Baisho Entertainment", behind him. While at the same time, he's the president of the "Meteorite Productions". He has managed many award-winning celebrities, such as Yura's father. Because of his vast knowledge of the show-biz world, he knows exactly what he needs to do to have his talents go to the top. Yura likes to call him "Shachou", meaning "Boss". It is later revealed that Keiichi's feelings for Yura might be more than just a manager/employee relationship. This becomes evident when he starts to forbid the relationship between Q-Ta and Yura, claiming that it will hurt her future career, though he also secretly wants Yura to himself. He denies being jealous of Q-Ta, or having feelings for Yura, but his actions prove otherwise.
Q-Ta Minamitani (南谷 Q太, Minamitani Q-Ta)
Q-Ta is a famous singer and composer for the band, Assha. He is a big fan of Takayuki Onozuka, Yura's father, and idolizes him. His real name is Kyuuta (久太); his nickname came from a meeting with Takayuki Onozuka, who mistakenly wrote "Q-ta" on an autograph when Q-Ta introduced himself. One of his songs, "Crystal", is the theme song for Yukari Shiraki's popular show The Moon's Waltz. He is nineteen years old and attends Tokyo University.
Yura first meets Q-Ta in an elevator when she runs out of the hotel at which she was staying during her parents' divorce problems. When he finds out who Yura is, he tells her he wants to marry her so he can become her famous father's son-in-law, despite not actually liking Yura. Because of his supportive nature and kindness, Yura trusts him a lot. However, Q-Ta's feelings towards Yura are less certain, since Yura suspects he is using her as a way to get to her father. Yura steadily grows fond of him and wants to know more about him; however, Q-Ta becomes increasingly possessive of her and shows little genuine interest in learning what Yura truly wants.
Haruka Minamitani (南谷 遥 (ハルカ), Minamitani Haruka)
Haruka is the leading man in the drama Yura is to star in. But his first job and passion is music, as he is a member of the popular music group "KNIGHTS". He is Q-Ta's twin brother, but does not get along with his brother or like being compared to Q-Ta. He lives in his own apartment alone while Q-Ta lives with their parents. Like Q-Ta, he takes an interest in Yura and frequently tries to help her succeed with her goals, though he does not do so directly.
Yura initially encounters Haruka when Mizorogi takes her to several parties to avoid the media after Yura's outburst regarding her parents' divorce. Since she also met Q-Ta earlier that day, Yura feels that Haruka looks familiar, but does not learn why until she meets him again at her audition for the drama they are to star in. Despite his rudeness towards her, Haruka supports Yura indirectly and is constantly amazed by her ability when she finds her confidence. However, he becomes jealous when he notices how his brother is growing closer to Yura and tells her that Q-Ta's strong point is that he can manipulate things the way he wants to by emotional-blackmailing. To encourage Yura's interest in him rather than Q-Ta, Haruka invites her to one of his concerts with a promise to give her more information on Q-Ta. However, despite earning Yura's admiration and respect, she is still more interested in Q-Ta.
Haruka's respect for Yura gradually grows into a one-sided crush on her, despite knowing Q-Ta has the advantage of winning over her. He supports Yura's dream of becoming an actress, so he was not only surprised but also angry upon discovering that Q-Ta didn't care about what scandals could hurt Yura's career if it meant they could spend more time with each other.
Nanase Shinohara (篠原 七瀬, Shinohara Nanase)
Nanase is a friend and roommate of Yura's from her manager's place. He addresses Yura by "Yura-pon". He takes care of everything around Mizorogi's house, including housekeeping and cooking meals. At the same time he is studying to be a make-up artist and hair stylist at a technical school; he is the one who gives Yura her new look. He is an old friend of Haruka and was a member of "KNIGHTS" before their debut. He has a crush on his childhood friend, Uehara, from "KNIGHTS".
Ryouko Nishiwaki (西脇 涼子, Nishiwaki Ryōko)
One of Mizurogi's office assistants, Nishiwaki supports Yura's efforts to become an actress and offers encouragement when Yura feels she is not doing well. She initially accompanies Yura to auditions when Mizurogi is unable to.
Kenji Nakazono (中園 ケンジ, Nakazono Kenji)
The director of the drama Yura will star in. While his first impression of her was unfavourable, she captures his interest with her honesty and sudden confidence during her auditions. As a result, he chooses her to be Natsuki, the protagonist of his drama revolving around an udon noodle shop and its tie-in commercial, despite the fact she is the least experienced. Nakazono has a great deal of faith in Yura's abilities and finds her ingenuity remarkable, but is aware that her career is still delicate and that she can be overshadowed by her parents' fame.
Takayuki Onozuka (小野塚 孝行, Onozuka Takayuki)
Yura's father, the first Japanese composer to win an Academy Award. He currently lives in New York with his mistress and their family. Yura's mother suggests that he has little interest in his daughter and is unlikely to care for her after their divorce. Despite being apparently distant from her father, Yura recalls how he would play the piano as she woke up in the morning. After Yura chooses to become an actress, she receives an ultimatum from her father through Mizorogi stating that if she does not achieve success within a year, Yura will move to New York to join her father. Unknown to Yura, her father actually loves her greatly and had originally wanted to bring her to New York with him, but had been prevented from doing so by his jealous wife. When he and Yukari divorce, Takayuki reveals that he is willing to pay any amount of alimony to gain custody of Yura, which Yukari refuses in order maintain a hold on him.

== Reception ==
Reviewing volume 1, Eva Volin of ICv2 said "There isn't anything here that you wouldn't find in any average to above average shojo manga". However, she added that volume one is too early to give an accurate review of the series, saying "While I can't call volume one a powerhouse introduction, it is an effective set-up for the series and I'll be looking for volume two to see where the story goes".

In a review of the first volume, Casey Brienza of Anime News Network criticised the plot as "a transparent rip off of Skip Beat!. With a mopey heroine instead of a magnificently angry one and a cast of pretty boys with potentially bad intentions", but favorably compared Yura to Hatsumi Narita (protagonist of Hot Gimmick, a previous work by Aihara), stating the former "has a bit more backbone". In a review of the second volume, Brienza applauded Aihara's restraint, regarding her characterisation to be improving. In particular, she praised the introduction of a rival for Yukari, stating "It's both rare and refreshing to see an older woman character of this sort in manga, and I hold out hope that she will become a permanent recurring member of the series' supporting cast".
