= Enako =

Japanese cosplayer, voice actress and singer (born 1994)

- えなこ
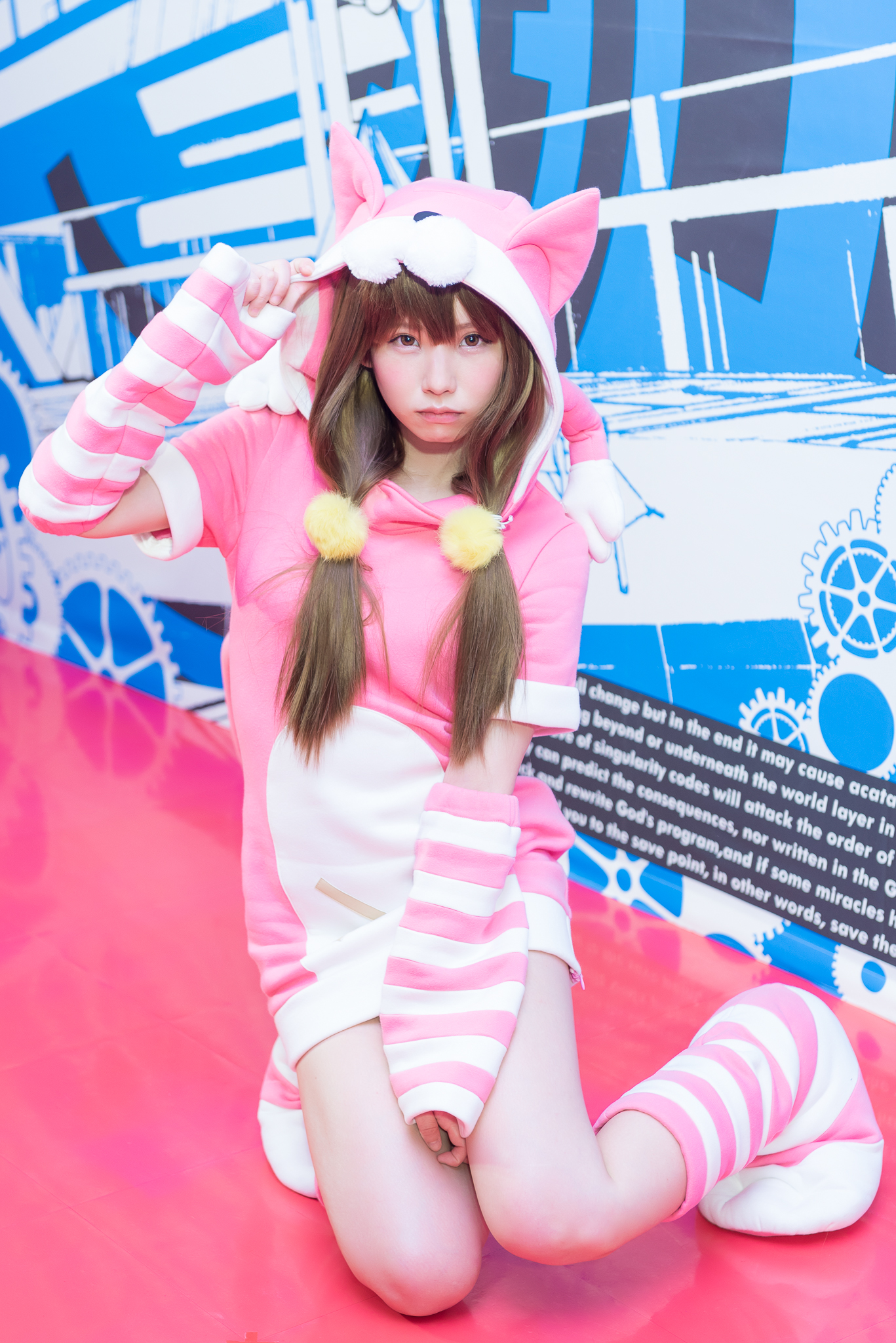
- Enako in character as Momo Aizaki from Anonymous;Code, April 2018
- Born: January 22, 1994 (age 32); Nagoya, Aichi, Japan
- Other name: Enakorin
- Occupations: cosplayer; singer; voice actress
- Years active: 2008–present
- Partner: Kenki
- Modeling information
- Agencies: PP Enter Prise inc.

YouTube information
- Channel: Enako Channel
- Years active: 2021–present
- Subscribers: 604 thousand
- Views: 32.5 million
- Last updated: 4 September 2024
- Musical career
- Genre: J-pop
- Years active: 2012–2013; 2020–present
- Formerly of: Panache!
- Website: Official website

Enako (Japanese: えなこ; born January 22, 1994) is a Japanese professional cosplayer, voice actress, and singer from Nagoya.

== Biography ==
Enako started cosplaying in second year of middle school after she became interested in the animated series The Melancholy of Haruhi Suzumiya and saw other cosplayers portraying the main character in Akihabara.

On October 24, 2012, Enako and fellow cosplayers Kuroneko and Akira Itsuki made their major label debut as the idol group Panache! under the label Defstar Records. The group disbanded on April 26, 2013 and Enako entered a temporary hiatus in her idol activities.

On March 4, 2015, Enako announced the resumption of her cosplay activities on her newly opened Twitter account.

In 2016, Enako revealed on a television show that she made over 1 million yen a month, and made 10 million yen in two days at that year's Comiket event. The Straits Times later reported that Enako made 130,000 Singapore dollars in one day at Comiket 2018. She also made an appearance at Comiket 2019.

On December 16, 2020, Enako made her debut as a solo singer with the release of her first mini-album, Dress Re Code.

On April 11, 2021, Enako launched her YouTube channel.

On July 30, 2022, PP Enterprises, Enako's agency, formed the idol group PPE41, and Enako became a member.

== Personal life ==
On July 1, 2021, Enako announced that she is dating Kenki, a professional gamer.

== Discography ==
=== Panache! ===
==== Album ====
Year	Title	Peak chart positions	Notes	Ref.
Year	Title	JPN Oricon	Notes	Ref.
2013	Reincarnation	86		

==== Singles ====
Year	Title	Peak chart positions	Notes	Ref.
Year	Title	JPN Oricon	Notes	Ref.
2012	"Kirameki Miraizu"	67		
2013	"Skybelieve"	86		

=== Solo ===
==== Album ====
Year	Title	Peak chart positions	Notes	Ref.
Year	Title	JPN Oricon	Notes	Ref.
2020	Dress Re Code	33		

==== Singles ====
Year	Title	Peak chart positions	Notes	Ref.
Year	Title	JPN Oricon	Notes	Ref.
2021	"Sp-lush Road"	31		

== Filmography ==
=== Photo CDs ===
Year	Titles
2011	Enako to Love Ru (えなことLOVEる); Ena Plus+ (エナプラス+); Toho Enakorin (東方えなこりん)
2012	Ena Sotu: Last High School (えな卒 ~Last High School~); Ena Cat; Ena Collection: Memorial (えなコレクション ~Memorial~)
2013	Koku no Kanaria (虚空のカナリア); Mini Enako Rin
2015	Uchi wa Otokonoko (ウチは男の娘。); Chuka Niian Niian (中華娘娘); Maid for Enakorin
2016	Ena Sotu: After School (えな卒 ~after school~); Little Tea Party

=== TV ===
- Idol Ouen Variety Seiji Chihara no Bazu Doru with Rena Matsui (アイドル応援バラエティ 千原せいじのバズ☆ドルwith松井玲奈) (2016)
- Motokare Retry (2022) — Nina Yamashita

=== Internet delivery ===
- ToukaigiTV no Ongaku Bangumi Geon! (闘会議TVの音楽番組げーおん!) (2015)
- Bemani Namahōsō (Kari) Dai 125-kai Volzza 2 Kadō Chokuzen Special!! (BEMANI生放送(仮)第125回!Volzza 2稼働直前スペシャル!!) (2016)

=== Video games ===
==== 2015 ====
- Mobile Strike (モバイルストライク; Nov.7, running)

==== 2016 ====
- Sangokushiranbu (三国志乱舞; Jan.22)
- Reflec Beat Volzza 2 (Mar.24) – Recorded Music「Precioue☆Star DJ Totto feat. Enako」
- Shinkukan Dolls (真空管ドールズ; The end of April) – Hime Takatsuki Voice acting

=== Anime ===
- Armor Shop for Ladies & Gentlemen (2018–2021) – Maō
- Yu-Gi-Oh! Go Rush!! (2022–2024) – Princess of the Flock - Miss Mutton and Energy Copyko
- Isshiki-san Wants to Know About Love (2027) – Nene Haneshita
