= Asuka Kawazu =

Japanese actress and gravure idol

- 川津 明日香
- Born: February 12, 2000 (age 26); Tokyo, Japan
- Occupations: Actress; gravure model
- Years active: 2014–present
- Agent: Irving
- Height: 1.65 m (5 ft 5 in)
- Website: Official profile

Asuka Kawazu (川津 明日香, Kawazu Asuka; born February 12, 2000 in Tokyo, Japan) is a Japanese actress, fashion model and gravure idol. She is represented by the agency Irving.

== Biography ==
In 2014, Kawazu won the title of Miss Seventeen 2014 and first started her career as an exclusive model for the Japanese Seventeen magazine.

She made her acting debut in the 2016 live-action film Defying Kurosaki-kun.

She starred as the female lead in the 2020 tokusatsu drama Kamen Rider Saber.

== Filmography ==
=== Films ===
Year	Title	Role	Notes	Ref.
2016	Defying Kurosaki-kun	Takako Kurusu		
2017	My Brother Loves Me Too Much	Aika Kirino		
2019	17-Year-Old Cinderella	Aoi		
2020	Kamen Rider Saber Theatrical Short Story: The Phoenix Swordsman and the Book of Ruin	Mei Sudo		
2021	Between Us	Hikari Mashiba		
2021	Saber + Zenkaiger: Super Hero Senki	Mei Sudo		
2022	Once Hit the Bottom			

=== Television series ===
Year	Title	Role	Network	Notes
2015	Defying Kurosaki-kun	Takako Kurusu	NTV	
2016	Tower of Sand	Narumi Hashiguchi	TBS	
2017	My Brother Loves Me Too Much	Aika Kirino	NTV	
2018	Saki: Achiga-hen episode of side-A	Yuka Tatsumi	MBS	
2019	Mr. Hiiragi's Homeroom	Reina Kageyama in the fake video	NTV	Final episode
2020	My Housekeeper Nagisa-san	Aki Hibino	TBS	Episodes 3 and 7
2020	Kamen Rider Saber	Mei Sudo	TV Asahi	
2021	Kasouken no Onna Season 21	Mitsuki Shiina	TV Asahi	Episode 11
2022	Motokare Retry	Mitsu Haneki	MBS	
2022	I Will Be Your Bloom	Ririka	TBS	
2023	Keishicho Outsider	Rina Mizushima	TV Asahi	Episode 1
2023	Akai Ringo	Yu Minase	ABC	
2023	Himitsu wo Motta Shonentachi	Azusa Tsuda	NTV	
2024	Sugar Sugar Honey	Mizuki Sahara	Tokyo MX	
2024	Black Girl's Talk	Fuka Sakashita	TV Tokyo	Episode 6
2024	Shanai Shokeinin: Kanojo wa Teki wo Keshite Iku	Saki Shiraishi	Kansai TV	
2024	Kao ni Doro wo Nuru	Chinatsu Tani	TV Asahi	
2024	Toshishita Kareshi Season 2	Arisa	ABC	Episode 4
2024	Rikon Koya	Akari Ikeda	ABC	
2025	Konya wa... Junretsu	Narumi Mineta	TV Tokyo	

=== Web series ===
Year	Title	Role	Network	Notes
2019	Renai Drama na Koi ga Shitai Season 3	Asuka	AbemaTV	
2020	Followers		Netflix	Episode 2
2020	Kamen Rider Saber Spin-off: Swordsman History	Mei Sudo	Telasa	Episodes 3 and 4
2021	Kamen Rider Saber × Ghost	Mei Sudo	Toei Tokusatsu Fan Club	
2021	Kamen Rider Specter × Blades	Mei Sudo	Toei Tokusatsu Fan Club	
2022	Motokare Retry: Kanoko ga Shiranai Bokutachi no Honne	Haneki Mitsuki	dTV	
2022	Fukumen D	Mizuho Hashimoto	AbemaTV	
2023	Kuro-chan's Love: Yappari, Aidashin		Paravi	Episode 3
