= Yūta Furukawa =

Japanese actor, singer, and model

Yūta Furukawa (古川 雄大, Furukawa Yūta; born July 9, 1987) is a Japanese actor, singer, and model. He is best known for his roles as Shusuke Fuji in Musical: The Prince of Tennis; Sebastian Michaelis in the Black Butler musicals, and Kirikaze in Fuma no Kojiro. He is managed by Ken-On.

== Biography ==
Furukawa was born on July 9, 1987, in Nagano Prefecture.

== Filmography ==
=== Television ===
- The Way of the Househusband (2020), Tatsuki Sakai
- Yakuza Lover (2022), Toshiomi Oya
- Hayabusa Fire Brigade (2023), Akimitsu Manabe
- Ōoku: The Inner Chambers (2023), Takiyama
- Unbound (2025), Santō Kyōden
- The Scent of the Wind (2026), Masuo Imai

=== Film ===
- The Way of the Househusband (2022), Tatsuki Sakai
- My Boyfriend in Orange (2022), Kazuma Shindō
- Tokyo MER: Mobile Emergency Room – Capital Crisis (2026)

=== Stage ===
- The Prince of Tennis Musical: The Progressive Match Higa Chuu feat. Rikkai (In Winter 2007–2008)
- Mozart! (2018)
- PATi★Night Episode 03 (ZEPP TOKYO)2009
- PATi★Night Episode 04 (AKASAKA BLITZ)2009
- FULL COLOR VARiATiON ★FIRST ONE MAN LIVE (LIQUID ROOM)2010
- FULL SUMMER VACATiON (SHIBUYA 0-EAST, NAGOYA E.L.L, OSAKA MUSE)2010
- Acoustic Live ENDLESS SUMMER VACATiON (SHINJUKU FACE)2010
- Musical PHANTOM (as Earl Philippe de Chandon)(2010 11/2～)
- Musical ELISABETH (Chunichi Theatre) 2012 8/3~26
- Musical Shōwa Genroku Rakugo Shinjū as Yakumo
- Kuroshitsuji Musical 3: Lycoris that blazes the earth (2015 rerun as Sebastian Michaelis)
- Kuroshitsuji Musical 4: Noah's Ark Circus (2016) as Sebastian Michaelis
- Kuroshitsuji Musical 5: Tango on the Campania (2018) as Sebastian Michaelis
- Romeo et Juliette (Toho Black 2019) as Romeo
- Fuuma no Kojirou as Kirikaze

TENIMYU: THE PRINCE OF TENNIS MUSICAL SERIES (as Shusuke Fuji)

- The Prince of Tennis Musical: Dream Live 5th (2008)
- The Prince of Tennis Musical: The Imperial Presence Hyotei Gakuen feat. Higa Chuu (2008)
- The Prince of Tennis Musical: The Treasure Match Shitenhouji feat. Hyotei Gakuen (2008-2009)
- The Prince of Tennis Musical: Dream Live 6th (2009)

== Discography ==
- FULL COLOR VARiATiON (May 26, 2010)
- Kako no Sora, Mirai no Boku (2010)
- I (August 28, 2009)
- Sunday (April 1, 2009)
- COLOR VARiATiON (October 28, 2009)
- PASTEL GRAFFiTi (October 29, 2008)
- Fuma no Kojiro Character Songs Collection (December 19, 2007)

=== CD ===
- Fuma no Kojiro Character Songs Collection (December 19, 2007)
- PASTEL GRAFFiTi (October 29, 2008)
- COLOR VARiATiOn (October 28, 2009)
- SUMMER VACATiON (August 25, 2010)
- STUDIO SUNSHINE (February 5, 2013)

== Photobook ==
- Tokyo Jitensha Monogatari Photo Movie Book (2009)
- MEN'S Photobook "Lu" (March 19, 2008)
- Musical The Prince Of Tennis Photo Book (2009)
