= Snow Angel (manga) =

Japanese manga series

- First tankōbon volume cover

この雪原で君が笑っていられるように (Kono Setsugen de Kimi ga Waratteirareru yō ni)
- Genre: Drama; Romance
- Manga
- Written by: Haruka Chizu
- Published by: Shogakukan
- English publisher: NA: Viz Media
- Imprint: Flower Comics Special
- Magazine: Cheese!
- Original run: 24 May 2023 – 24 September 2024
- Volumes: 4

Snow Angel (Japanese: この雪原で君が笑っていられるように, Hepburn: Kono Setsugen de Kimi ga Waratteirareru yō ni; "May This Snowfield Keep You Smiling All The Time") is a Japanese manga series written and illustrated by Haruka Chizu. It was serialized in Shogakukan's Cheese! magazine from May 2023 to September 2024.

== Plot ==
Muku Shiraka is laid off after her company disbands, and after her father is killed in an accident, she and her sister Inori Shiraka move to a rural area of Japan to work as young carers for their grandfather, who is diagnosed with dementia. While dealing with a family that controls her obsessively, she reunites with her childhood friends Yuto and Saku Amasawa.

== Publication ==
Haruka Chizu had initially planned to write a romance manga, and even devised personalities for the Shiraka sisters and the Amasawa brothers (as well as relationships with each other), but changed the focus to young carers to add more interest to the story. She did research on the young carer community to portray them sensitively, including book readings and visits to NPOs. Chizu recalled in an interview that "more people than [she] expected said that they were young carers or that their friends were young carers", which influenced her decision to refocus the manga.

Snow Angel began serializing in Shogakukan's Cheese! magazine in its July 2023 issue, released on 24 May 2023. Shogakukan released the manga's first tankōbon volume on 24 November 2023 under its Flower Comics Special imprint. Viz Media licensed Snow Angel for English-language distribution, and released the first volume on 13 May 2025. It is part of Viz's Shojo Beat imprint.

Snow Angel features several locations within Fukui Prefecture (Chizu is a native of Tsuruga, which is in central Fukui), with Chizu herself visiting the area to get references. In July 2024, in tandem with the third volume's publication, the manga announced a collaboration with its setting Minamiechizen, Fukui. It promoted the young carer issue the work is centered on with freely-distributed pamphlets.

=== Volumes ===
No.	Original release date	Original ISBN	English release date	English ISBN
1	24 November 2023	978-4-09-872446-8	13 May 2025	978-1-9747-5465-6
2	26 February 2024	978-4-09-872560-1	12 August 2025	978-1-9747-5543-1
3	25 July 2024	978-4-09-872696-7	13 January 2026	978-1-9747-5903-3
4	25 December 2024	978-4-09-873008-7	3 March 2026	978-1-9747-6196-8

== Reception ==
Danica Davidson of Otaku USA said that the "first volume starts off sweetly, implies it could go in different ways, and offers some food for thought with the struggles Muku experiences with her family". MrAJCosplay of Anime News Network gave it three stars out of five, praising its realistic handling of domestic abuse but expressing skepticism over the work's ability to simultaneously handle a romance arc alongside such sensitive subject matter Piedra praised the plentiful character development, which he "didn't expect to find right out of the gate", as well as the relatively lighthearted tone in contrast to his expectations of "something along the lines of Boy's Abyss". He was less enthused about the pacing, such as the quick resolution of the initial drama regarding an abusive home life, but felt it improved in the second volume.

Rebecca Silverman of Anime News Network gave the manga a four out of five, saying that "Snow Angel understands the toll [caregiving] can take, especially if you're not allowed to do or be anything else, and how the added burden of being the eldest daughter can compound everything", but criticized Yuto's character and nature as a love interest. VTuber Ken Isshou recommended the manga on the 10 December 2023 episode of the Nippon Broadcasting System radio show Mucomi VR, citing three reasons: "It was the first time I had a vivid understanding of young carers, [...] good intentions are painful [...] and the childhood friend is extremely handsome".

The art style was generally well received. Davidson called the art "cute and fitting, with a shojo style," with a "very wintry feel" due to its snowy setting. Piedra called the flashback sequences "cute and charming" and opined that "if you're looking for an unconventional romance story with quite a few cute moments, this will do the job". Silverman praised Muku's "zoning out scene", where she appears in a watery tank, as one of the "strongest parts" of volume 1, writing that "Chizu makes each panel of dissociation feel claustrophobic and suffocating".
