= Alice-san Chi no Iroribata =

Japanese manga series

- First tankōbon volume cover

アリスさんちの囲炉裏端 (Arisu-san Chino irori-tan)
- Genre: Gourmet; Romance
- Manga
- Written by: Bunta Kinami
- Published by: Shueisha
- Imprint: Young Jump Comics
- Magazine: Ultra Jump
- Original run: October 17, 2020 – March 17, 2023
- Volumes: 4
- Television drama
- Directed by: Tetsuo Shinohara; Miki Tomita; Takanori Takahashi
- Written by: Yūko Imanishi
- Studio: Canter; TBS
- Original network: BS-TBS, tvk, RKB, CBC, HBC
- Original run: January 7, 2025 – March 11, 2025
- Episodes: 10
- icon

Alice-san Chi no Iroribata (Japanese: アリスさんちの囲炉裏端, Hepburn: Arisu-san Chino irori-tan; "Beside the Hearth at Alice-san's House") is a Japanese manga series written and illustrated by Bunta Kinami. It was serialized in Shueisha's seinen manga magazine Ultra Jump from October 2020 to March 2023, with its chapters collected in four tankōbon volumes. A ten-episode live-action television drama adaptation aired from January to March 2025.

== Plot ==
Alice returns to her rural hometown after spending ten years living in Tokyo. She begins living alone in her childhood home, a traditional Japanese house centered around an irori, a sunken hearth used for cooking and warmth. Adjusting to the slower pace of countryside life, Alice resumes her daily routines of cooking, maintaining the house, and reconnecting with the local community. Soon after returning, she reunites with her childhood friend Harumi, who visits her home and begins spending time with her again. As they share meals and conversations around the hearth, the two gradually rebuild their relationship after years apart.

== Characters ==
Alice Minase (水瀬アリス, Minase Arisu)
Portrayed by: Fumika Baba

== Media ==
=== Manga ===
Written and illustrated by Bunta Kinami, Alice-san Chi no Iroribata was serialized in Shueisha's seinen manga magazine Ultra Jump from October 17, 2020, to March 17, 2023. Shueisha collected its chapters in four tankōbon volumes, released from June 18, 2021, to May 19, 2023. A special one-shot chapter, to celebrate the series' live-action drama adaptation, was published in Ultra Jump on January 18, 2025.

==== Volumes ====
No.	Release date	ISBN
1	June 18, 2021	978-4-08-892020-7
2	March 18, 2022	978-4-08-892255-3
3	September 16, 2022	978-4-08-892442-7
4	May 19, 2023	978-4-08-892698-8

=== Drama ===
A live-action television drama adaptation was announced on November 22, 2024. The drama will be directed by Tetsuo Shinohara, Miki Tomita, and Takanori Takahashi, with scripts by Yūko Imanishi and stars Fumika Baba in the lead role as Alice Minase. It aired for ten episodes on BS-TBS and other networks from January 7 to March 11, 2025. The ending theme song is "Aloe" (アロエ, Aroe), performed by Manato Funatsu.
