= Dawn of the Arcana =

Japanese manga series

黎明のアルカナ (Reimei no Arukana)
- Genre: Fantasy, romance
- Manga
- Written by: Rei Toma
- Published by: Shōgakukan
- English publisher: Viz Media
- Imprint: Flower Comics
- Magazine: Cheese!
- Original run: 24 January 2009 – 24 June 2013
- Volumes: 13
- Other
- The King's Beast (spin-off)

Dawn of the Arcana (Japanese: 黎明のアルカナ, Hepburn: Reimei no Arukana) is a Japanese manga series written and illustrated by Rei Toma. It was serialized in Cheese! and licensed by Viz Media. This is Rei Toma's first manga to be published in English as well as its original language.

== Plot ==
Nakaba, a princess of Senan is forced to marry Caesar, a prince of Belquat in an attempt to ease the bad relations between the two kingdoms. Because of the marriage, Loki, and Nakaba have to move to Senan's rival kingdom Belquat. Nakaba discover she holds the bloodline for the Arcana of time, a power that was feared, and as a result everyone that was discovered to have the Arcana was slaughtered, but a few have survived. Every Arcana is different to each tribe, and Nakaba's allows her to see in the past or future, dubbed the "Arcana of Time". Ajin are half-human and half-animal, a sub-species, and are usually looked down upon or mistreated and forced to be the labour force, and the rebellion grows stronger with every day. Nakaba soon finds herself in the middle of a love triangle with Loki and Caesar, a struggle between Belquat and Senan, as well as the battle for equality between Ajin and ordinary humans.

=== Main characters ===
- Nakaba (ナカバ), is a red-haired princess of Senan (セナン) and possesses the Arcana of Time. She is brought to the Senan court by Loki after her mother was butchered by Belquat men. Although she first believes her marriage is a sentence of eventual death, she begins to see ways to change the injustices of both her own nation of Senan as well as those of Belquat, although she fears she must surrender her own happiness to achieve these goals. She is beautiful with red hair that is deemed unroyal, has large green eyes, and a small and slim body. Nakaba finds out that she is also Loki's little sister after she hears that Loki has died.
- Caesar (シーザ, Shiiza), a prince of Belquat (ベルクート, Beruqūto), as well as Nakaba's husband. Originally second in line to the throne of Belquat, he is made heir to the throne later after various political machinations force him to decide Belquat needs to change its policies. He has a child with Nakaba at the end of the series.
- Loki (ロキ, Roki), Princess Nakaba's attendant, guard, and brother also a Half-Ajin. Loki wishes to help the Ajin gain more freedom and self-determination instead of being treated as slaves who aren't worth acknowledging. He dies in the final volume of Dawn of the Arcana as he overused his Arcana. He is Nakaba's older brother though Nakaba only finds that out after he has died. At the start of the series, he is 27 years old.

=== Other characters ===
- Bellinus (ベリナス, Berinasu), a fair haired young man, slightly older than Prince Caesar who acts as a political adviser and confidante to Caesar. The two have been together since Caesar was very young. Loves his younger sister Lemiria greatly.
- Cain (カイン, Kain), prince and heir of the kingdom of Belquat, Caesar's half-brother, engaged to Louise. Due to his blond hair, he is seen as being less royal than Caesar. Is handsome and kind, but hates Caesar as he envies him. In love with Louise and admires Nakaba for her bravery and boldness. Dies at Loki's hand.
- Louise (ルイス, Ruisu), a dark-haired young noble woman, fiancée at first to Cain. In the beginning, she continually flirts with Caesar, to Cain's discomfort. Later develops a genuine affection for Cain but by then he had died.
- Lemiria (レミリア, Remiria), Bellinus's sister, who possesses the Arcana of Heartsight and becomes Nakaba's first female friend. She is 18 years old.
- Adel (アデル, Aderu), dark-haired prince of Senan. As a young boy, he used to constantly bully Nakaba, particularly making fun of her red hair, because he liked to see her cry. Later implied that he has an interest in Nakaba, but realises that her heart has been given to Caesar. Heir to the throne of Senan. Nakaba steals his crown and he says he'll never forgive her. Evidence suggests that he was in love with her.

== Manga ==
The manga was serialized in Cheese! from 24 January 2003 until 24 June 2013 in issues dated from March 2003 to August 2013. Thirteen volumes have been published in Japanese by Shogakukan, in English by Viz Media, in Chinese by Tong Li Publishing, in French by Kazé Manga, in German by Carlsen Verlag, and in Italian by Flashbook.

=== Volume list ===
No.	Original release date	Original ISBN	English release date	English ISBN
1	26 May 2009	978-4-09-132364-4	6 December 2011	978-1-4215-4104-4
2	25 September 2009	978-4-09-132666-9	7 February 2012	978-1-4215-4105-1
3	26 February 2010	978-4-09-133050-5	3 April 2012	978-1-4215-4106-8
4	25 June 2010	978-4-09-133217-2	5 June 2012	978-1-4215-4107-5
5	26 October 2010	978-4-09-133544-9	7 August 2012	978-1-4215-4213-3
6	25 February 2011	978-4-09-133718-4	2 October 2012	978-1-4215-4214-0
7	24 June 2011	978-4-09-133866-2	4 December 2012	978-1-4215-4215-7
8	26 October 2011	978-4-09-134200-3	5 February 2013	978-1-4215-4314-7
9	16 January 2012	978-4-09-134339-0	2 April 2013	978-1-4215-4920-0
10	26 June 2012	978-4-09-134446-5	4 June 2013	978-1-4215-5245-3
11	26 November 2012	978-4-09-134817-3	1 October 2013	978-1-4215-5889-9
12	26 April 2013	978-4-09-135280-4	8 April 2014	978-1-4215-6457-9
13	26 September 2013	978-4-09-135525-6	2 September 2014	978-1-4215-6950-5

== Reception ==
"Young readers looking for shojo fantasy will want to try Dawn of the Arcana." – Leroy Douresseaux, Comic Book Bin. "With hints of magic powers, complex international relations, and a variety of twisted pasts, fantasy and romance fans alike will want to pick this up, particularly with the promise that this series will only get more interesting as it gets going." – Rebecca Silverman, Anime News Network. "I will tell you the premise of this manga, and it will then become obvious to you why it was chosen to translate, because it's got a ton of hooks that will be of interest to the target teen female reader." – Johanna Draper Carlson, Manga Worth Reading. "The tale has romance, combat, politics and a host of other things... think of it as a bit like A Game of Thrones, but accessible to a younger audience." – Nick Smith, ICv2.

== See also ==
- The Water Dragon's Bride, another manga series by the same creator
