= Namete, Kajitte, Tokidoki Medete =

Japanese manga series

- First tankōbon volume cover

なめて、かじって、ときどき愛でて
- Genre: Erotic comedy; Romantic comedy
- Manga
- Written by: Shin Yumachi
- Published by: Shogakukan
- Imprint: Flower Comics
- Magazine: Cheese!
- Original run: September 24, 2016 – December 23, 2022
- Volumes: 15

Namete, Kajitte, Tokidoki Medete (なめて、かじって、ときどき愛でて) is a Japanese manga series written and illustrated by Shin Yumachi. It was serialized in Shogakukan's Cheese! magazine from September 2016 to December 2022.

== Publication ==
Written and illustrated by Shin Yumachi, Namete, Kajitte, Tokidoki Medete was serialized in Shogakukan's Cheese! magazine from September 24, 2016, to December 23, 2022. The series' chapters were collected into fifteen tankōbon volumes from February 24, 2017, to February 24, 2023.

No.	Release date	ISBN
1	February 24, 2017	978-4-09-139138-4
2	July 26, 2017	978-4-09-139489-7
3	January 26, 2018	978-4-09-139874-1
4	June 26, 2018	978-4-09-870080-6
5	October 26, 2018	978-4-09-870255-8
6	February 26, 2019	978-4-09-870394-4
7	June 26, 2019	978-4-09-870491-0
8	October 25, 2019	978-4-09-870654-9
9	March 26, 2020	978-4-09-870801-7
10	July 27, 2020	978-4-09-871073-7
11	December 25, 2020	978-4-09-871207-6
12	June 25, 2021	978-4-09-871323-3
13	February 25, 2022	978-4-09-871573-2
14	September 26, 2022	978-4-09-871726-2
15	February 24, 2023	978-4-09-871894-8

== Reception ==
By February 2023, the series had over 2.3 million copies in circulation.
