= Hazuki Tanda =

Japanese singer and actress

- 反田 葉月
- Born: 28 February 2001 (age 25)
- Occupations: Singer; actress
- Years active: 2017–present
- Employer: Platinum Production
- Notable work: D4DJ as Miyu Sakurada; BanG Dream! as Mana Sumita
- Musical career
- Member of: Lyrical Lily
- Formerly of: Palet; Nankin Pepper

Hazuki Tanda (Japanese: 反田 葉月, Hepburn: Tanda Hazuki; born 28 February 2001) is a Japanese singer and actress from Hiroshima Prefecture, affiliated with Platinum Production. After being part of the idol groups Palet and Nankin Pepper, she joined the D4DJ franchise as Miyu Sakurada and became a voice actress for anime such as Remake Our Life!, Cardfight!! Vanguard will+Dress, and BanG Dream! It's MyGO!!!!!.

== Biography ==
Hazuki Tanda, a native of Hiroshima Prefecture, was born on 28 February 2001. After hearing her mother sing the BoA song "Sweet Impact" at a karaoke as an elementary school student, she was inspired to go into dancing and enrolled in Actor's School Hiroshima. She was part of the Reremon-tai group on TV Shin-Hiroshima's morning news show Hiroshima Manten Mama!!.

In October 2015, while visiting Tokyo with Miina Yoneda (who would later become an idol singer), she was scouted by Platinum Production twice. Afterwards, she moved to Tokyo when she became a high school student because she felt it would be easier to audition there. On 17 January 2017, she joined the idol group Palet. After Palet disbanded, she joined the newly-formed idol group Nankin Pepper in March 2018, before they later disbanded in January 2020.

In April 2020, she became part of the D4DJ franchise as Miyu Sakurada, one of four members of Lyrical Lily. She voiced the character in D4DJ Groovy Mix (2020), D4DJ Petit Mix (2021), and D4DJ All Mix (2023).

In June 2021, she was cast as Miyoko Hashiba in Remake Our Life!. In April 2022, she was cast as Himari Kanoashi in Cardfight!! Vanguard will+Dress. In 2023, she voiced Mana in BanG Dream! It's MyGO!!!!!.

She also appeared in the music videos of Non Stop Rabbit's 2019 song "Kimi to Saigo ni Erabu Kotoba" and Silent Siren's 2019 song "Hero".

== Filmography ==
=== Live-action television ===
2019

- Hajimete Koi o Shita Hi ni Yomu Hanashi (episode 2)
- Hey Sensei, Don't You Know?, Makoto

2020

- Shiranakute Iikoto (episode 9)

=== Anime television ===
2021

- D4DJ Petit Mix, Miyu Sakurada
- Remake Our Life!, Miyoko Hashiba

2022

- Cardfight!! Vanguard will+Dress, Himari Kanoashi

2023

- BanG Dream! It's MyGO!!!!!, Mana Sumita
- D4DJ All Mix, Miyu Sakurada

2025

- Ave Mujica - The Die is Cast -, Mana Sumita

=== Anime films ===
- BanG Dream! Ave Mujica prima aurora (2026), Mana Sumita

=== Music videos ===
2019

- "Kimi to Saigo ni Erabu Kotoba" (2019) by Non Stop Rabbit
- "Hero" (2019) by Silent Siren

=== Stage productions ===
2019

- Gekidan Episode 0: Anata no Ban

2022

- Butai Lyrical Lily: Senri! no Michi mo Ippo Kara

=== Video games ===
2020

- D4DJ Groovy Mix, Miyu Sakurada
