= Hey Sensei, Don't You Know? =

Japanese manga series

- Cover of the Japanese version of vol. 1, first released on November 8, 2019

ねぇ先生、知らないの? (Nē Sensei, Shiranai no?)
- Genre: Romance
- Manga
- Written by: Aya Asano
- Published by: Shogakukan
- Imprint: Flower Comics Alpha
- Magazine: Premier Cheese! (2018–2020); Cheese! (2020–2022)
- Original run: November 5, 2018 – October 24, 2022
- Volumes: 10
- Television drama
- Directed by: Smith; Keijirō Tsubakimoto; Tatsuya Aoki
- Produced by: Yuichi Sakurai
- Written by: Yuko Shimoda
- Licensed by: Rakuten Viki
- Original network: MBS TV
- Original run: December 6, 2019 – January 17, 2020
- Episodes: 6
- icon

Hey Sensei, Don't You Know? (Japanese: ねぇ先生、知らないの？, Hepburn: Nē Sensei, Shiranai no?) is a Japanese manga series by Aya Asano. Hey Sensei, Don't You Know? is serialized in the digital monthly shōjo manga magazine Premier Cheese! beginning on November 5, 2018. The series was later moved to the print monthly magazine Cheese! beginning on September 24, 2020, where it ran until its conclusion on October 24, 2022. A live-action television drama adaptation was broadcast from December 6, 2019, to January 17, 2020, as the fifth entry to MBS TV's programming block Drama Tokku.

== Plot ==
Hana Aoi lives a busy life as a shōjo manga artist, leaving herself with no time to focus on her personal life and relationships. While visiting an upscale salon, she meets Riichi Kido, a popular beautician, who offers to cut her hair. Riichi falls in love with Hana at first sight and asks her if they could be in a relationship. Having no boyfriend before, Hana accepts, and throughout their relationship, she learns how to face challenges between balancing both work and relationships.

== Characters ==
Hana Aoi (青井 華, Aoi Hana)
Portrayed by: Fumika Baba
Hana is a popular shōjo manga artist. Her job keeps her busy to the point where she is unable to focus on her personal life. Baba described her as "clumsy" with a "[tendency] to prioritize her work."
Riichi Kido (城戸 理一, Kido Ri'ichi)
Portrayed by: Eiji Akaso
Riichi is a beautician who is popular at the salon he works at, and he falls in love with Hana at first sight. Akaso described him as "loyal, honest, having tolerance, and a very cool guy."
Nanase Hoshino (星野 七瀬, Hoshino Nanase)
Portrayed by: Honoka Yahagi
Nanase is a famous young actress and a big fan of Hana's manga series. She has been in love with Riichi for a long time.
Asahi Kiritani (桐谷 朝陽, Kiritani Asahi)
Portrayed by: Masanari Wada
Kiritani is Hana's editor.
Jun (潤)
Portrayed by: Tsuyoshi Furukawa
Jun is Riichi's co-worker who greatly admires him.

== Media ==
=== Manga ===
Hey Sensei, Don't You Know? is written and illustrated by Aya Asano. It was first serialized in the digital monthly shōjo manga magazine Premier Cheese! from the December 2018 issue released on November 5, 2018. The series was transferred to Cheese! beginning with the November 2020 issue released on September 4, 2020, and ran until its conclusion in December 2022 issue released on October 24, 2022. The chapters were later released in ten bound volumes by Shogakukan under their Flower Comics Alpha imprint.

| No. | Japanese release date | Japanese ISBN |
|---|---|---|
| 1 | November 8, 2019 | 978-4098706563 |
| 2 | December 26, 2019 | 978-4098708123 |
| 3 | May 26, 2020 | 978-4098710034 |
| 4 | October 26, 2020 | 978-4098712007 |
| 5 | February 25, 2021 | 978-4098712557 |
| 6 | July 26, 2021 | 978-4098714056 |
| 7 | November 26, 2021 | 978-4098715145 |
| 8 | April 26, 2022 | 978-4098716371 |
| 9 | August 26, 2022 | 978-4098717200 |
| 10 | December 26, 2022 | 978-4098718498 |

=== Television drama ===
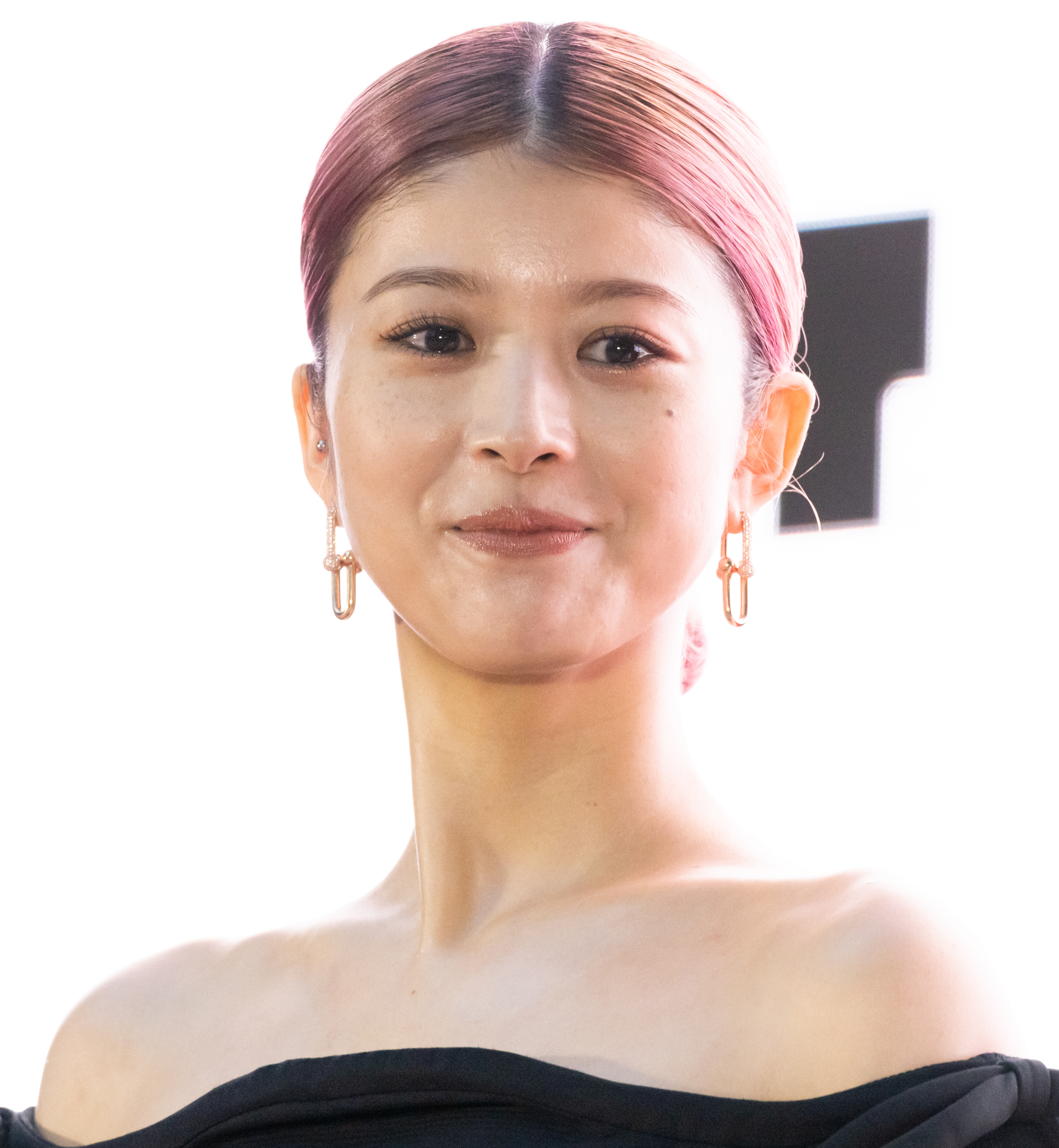
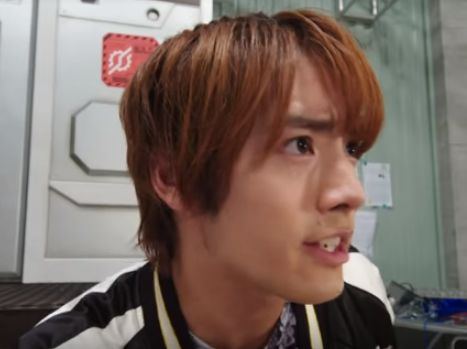
Fumika Baba (left, pictured in 2022) and Eiji Akaso (right, pictured in 2018) co-starred in the live-action drama adaptation.

A live-action television series adaptation was announced on November 3, 2019, as the fifth entry to MBS TV's late-night Thursday television block, Drama Tokku. The series aired on MBS TV from December 6, 2019, (Note: MBS lists the broadcast date as December 5, 2019, at 00:59, which is December 6, 2019, at 12:59 a.m.) to January 17, 2019, for 6 episodes. Other broadcasts include TV Kanagawa, Chiba TV, and TV Saitama.

The series stars Fumika Baba as Hana and Eiji Akaso as Riichi. To prepare for the drama adaptation, Baba had to learn how to hold a pen properly to draw, while Akaso took a brief course in hairdressing. Additional cast members include Masanari Wada as Kiritani, Honoka Yahagi as Nanase, and Super Dragon member Tsuyoshi Furukawa as Jun. Milk member Ryubi Miyase and Nankin Pepper member Hazuki Tanda play two original characters created for the drama, Koinuma and Makoto respectively, who are Hana's manga assistants.

The drama adaptation is directed by Keijirō Tsubakimoto and Tatsuya Aoki, with Smith as the supervising director and Yuko Shimoda in charge of the script. The opening theme song is "Sunny" by MaRuRi and Ryuga, and the ending theme is "Love" by Bolbbalgan4.

| No. | Title | Original release date |
|---|---|---|
| 1 | "Episode 1"; Transliteration: "Dai-ichi-wa" (Japanese: 第1話) | December 6, 2019 |
| 2 | "Episode 2"; Transliteration: "Dai-ni-wa" (Japanese: 第2話) | December 13, 2019 |
| 3 | "Episode 3"; Transliteration: "Dai-san-wa" (Japanese: 第3話) | December 20, 2019 |
| 4 | "Episode 4"; Transliteration: "Dai-yon-wa" (Japanese: 第4話) | December 27, 2019 |
| 5 | "Episode 5"; Transliteration: "Dai-go-wa" (Japanese: 第5話) | January 10, 2020 |
| 6 | "Episode 6"; Transliteration: "Dai-roku-wa" (Japanese: 第6話) | January 17, 2020 |

== Reception ==
The Television reported that the manga was downloaded 250,000 times within five months from Premier Cheese!.
