= 5→9 From Five to Nine =

Japanese TV drama series

- Promotional poster
- Genre: Romance; Comedy
- Starring: Satomi Ishihara; Tomohisa Yamashita
- Ending theme: "Christmas Song" by Back Number
- Country of origin: Japan
- Original language: Japanese
- No. of episodes: 10

Production
- Producers: Hiroyuki Gotō; Ayaka Kinjō
- Running time: Mondays at 21:00 to 21:54 (JST)

Original release
- Network: Fuji TV
- Release: 12 October – 14 December 2015

5-ji Kara 9-ji Made: Watashi ni Koi Shita Obōsan (5→9（5時から9時まで）〜私に恋したお坊さん〜) is a 2015 Fuji TV Japanese television drama series starring Satomi Ishihara and Tomohisa Yamashita. The drama is based on the manga series From Five to Nine by Miki Aihara. It aired from 12 October 2015 to 14 December 2015 with a total of 10 episodes. The first episode received a viewership rating of 12.6% in the Kantō region.

== Plot ==
Junko Sakuraba (Satomi Ishihara) is a 29-year-old English teacher who dreams of working in New York. One day, she causes an embarrassing accident resulting in her encountering a handsome Buddhist priest during a funeral service at a temple. Hoping to never see him again, she is later deceived by her family and forced to go to a matchmaking session. The other party is none other than that priest, Takane Hoshikawa (Tomohisa Yamashita).

== Cast ==
- Satomi Ishihara as Junko Sakuraba
- Tomohisa Yamashita as Takane Hoshikawa
- Yuki Furukawa as Satoshi Mishima
- Yuri Tsunematsu as Nene Sakuraba
- Saeko as Masako Mōri
- Rin Takanashi as Momoe Yamabuchi
- Mokomichi Hayami as Arthur Kimura (Arthur Lange in manga)
- Miyu Yoshimoto as Kaori Ashikaga
- Jun Shison as Amane Hoshikawa
- Mariko Kaga as Hibari Hoshikawa
- Kokoro Terada as Sankyu Naha

== Episodes ==
No.	Title	Directed by	Original release date	Viewers (%)
1	"ありえないプロポーズ!?"	Shin Hirano	12 October 2015	12.6
2	"あなたじゃないとダメなんです!私は絶対に離れない"	Shin Hirano	19 October 2015	12.1
3	"あなたを好きになることは一生絶対にありません!"	Shin Hirano	26 October 2015	10.7
4	"大波乱!!一触即発の四角関係!!禁断の秘密、バレる"	Masaki Tanimura	2 November 2015	11.6
5	"イケナイ一夜!?大波乱の四角関係に禁断のジエンド"	Hideyuki Aizawa	9 November 2015	11.7
6	"ハッピーウェディングは悪夢!?最強のライバル現る"	Shin Hirano	16 November 2015	10.6
7	"今夜決着!負けたら終わり!ラブトーナメント決勝!"	Masaki Tanimura	23 November 2015	12.1
8	"今夜限定!二人に訪れる切なすぎるラブエピソード..."	Hideyuki Aizawa	30 November 2015	11.4
9	"さよなら潤子さん...引き裂かれる恋、衝撃のラスト"	Shin Hirano	7 December 2015	11.6
10	"聖なる夜に恋の奇蹟!涙、涙のラストサプライズ"	Shin Hirano	14 December 2015	12.7

== Awards ==
Year	Award	Category	Recipients	Result
2015	87th Television Drama Academy Awards	Best Actress	Satomi Ishihara	Won
2015	87th Television Drama Academy Awards	Best Supporting Actor	Tomohisa Yamashita	Nominated
2015	87th Television Drama Academy Awards	Best Drama Song	Christmas Song	Won
