= The Water Dragon's Bride =

Japanese manga series

- Cover of the first Manga volume

水神の生贄〈はなよめ〉 (Suijin no Hanayome)
- Genre: Fantasy, Romance
- Manga
- Written by: Rei Toma
- Published by: Shogakukan
- English publisher: NA: Viz Media
- Magazine: Cheese!
- Original run: February 24, 2015 – January 25, 2019
- Volumes: 11

The Water Dragon's Bride (水神の生贄(はなよめ), Suijin no Hanayome) (Note: The kanji used in the title mean "The Water Dragon's Sacrifice", with the kanji for "sacrifice", ikenie (生贄) made to be read as "bride", hanayome (花嫁), instead using furigana.) is a shōjo manga by Rei Toma which was serialized in Shogakukan's Cheese! and is licensed in North America by Viz Media.

== Plot ==
Asahi, a modern-day child, is whisked away to a strange land set in a village in the past. She then befriends a boy named Subaru, who helps Asahi grow accustomed to her new life. Despite Subaru's efforts, Asahi gets in trouble when she's offered as a human sacrifice to a water dragon god! On what seems to be a whim, the god takes a liking to Asahi and decides to make her his bride once she grows older. However, he steals her voice with the intention of returning it to her when she comes of age.

Without any way to return to her home, she becomes the priestess (Miko) of the village, though many villagers do not completely trust her. However, only she knows that all her prayers would be for naught as the gods in this world generally do not want to get involved with humans in the first place. Despite this, other villages find out about the strange priestess with reddish pink hair and grey eyes and want to take her in hopes of having the water dragon's power on their side.

As time goes on, the water dragon begins to develop human-like emotions as he watches over the child growing up, and the conflict of power grows between the two.

== Characters ==
Asahi Arisa (朝日 アリサ)
Asahi is described as having curly red hair and strangely-colored eyes, but is stated to be pretty until she starts talking. Asahi becomes the water-priestess, when she is supposedly under the "protection" of the water dragon god. She also wins the affection of a boy named Subaru. At the beginning of the story, she is about eight years old when she is taken to this land and meets the water god, and she asks if he is a "pervert or a molester" for wanting a child as a bride. Not too long after the beginning of the story, there is a few year time skip, where she is a pre-teen or so. At the end of the series, she is still a minor at a high school age when she becomes officially engaged to become the water god's bride. She returns home on two different occasions.
Water God (水の神, Mizu no Kami)
Described as being at least 1,000 years old, the Water God is disinterested in human affairs. He is oftentimes cruel without meaning to, such as watching Asahi starve to death for 3 days straight in his domain because he had no idea humans needed to eat, or taking her voice away as punishment and never returning it to her until she was about 14. Though it is noted that all the gods seem to have some sort of grasp on human emotions, making him the only one who is like this. However, as he begins to get involved in Asahi's life, he starts to become more and more human to his surprise. He gives her the power to summon rain when she cries.
Subaru (スバル)
Subaru is Asahi's aid and is in love with Asahi after Book 1. He grows up with her and wants to protect her from his mother and other dangers that they face. Despite their closeness, Asahi is unaware of his feelings. He is set to inherit the village when he is older, but he is much more concerned with being Asahi's protector and travels with her to different villages. Oftentimes, he has an inner conflict with the Water God because of how callous the god was when he met him as a child. He gradually begins to accept the god as Asahi's love interest, though he still manages to confess his love when she leaves for the final time at the end of the series, but it goes completely unanswered. Ironically, the water god finds him a bother but believes Asahi would be a better match with him, often times keeping the two together.
Tsukihiko (月彦)
Tsukihiko is a man ten years older than the protagonist, and he becomes a sort of mentor or guide to her after she has returned from the lake that she was supposed to be sacrificed in. As it turns out, he is actually from a different village, where "someone like Asahi" had lived. The woman was a doctor from modern day, but without any way to go back, she lived out her life there in the village and died. The doctor is later revealed to be Tsukihiko's mother, though she hardly told him about where she had come from.
Kogahiko
Kogahiko is introduced as an enemy village leader, who wants to kidnap the water priestess for the sake of his village. He is brutish and underhanded, taking relative drastic measures to try and claim her as his woman. On two different occasions, he attempts to sexually assault or force a kiss on Asahi, but it's glossed over because Asahi is immediately swayed into thinking he's a good person because he is kind to the people in his village.
Subaru's Mother
Subaru's mother has an irrational hatred of Asahi, believing that the girl has bewitched her son. She abuses both children because of their bond, often slapping either one, or setting Asahi up to be ostracized or killed. She is never given repercussions for her actions, and her only concern is establishing her family's wealth and position in the village.
Shiina (紫衣那)
Shiina is the sister of Subaru. She is fearful of Asahi's unique appearance and demands that her brother to stay away from her. When she is later nursed by Asashi from an illness, she is reluctant to trust her but is barely present enough to have shown to reconcile.
Haruki (春姫)
Asahi's younger brother, who was born years after Asahi's unexplained disappearance. Growing up, there was a locked room in the house, and out of curiosity, he fakes a fever in order to sneak out of his elementary school and go home early before his mom returned. He's confused when all he found was a child's room, noticing a photograph of his parents with a girl he's never met. When his mother finds him there, he immediately apologizes for breaking the rule, but in her desperation, she mistook him as Asahi coming back home. After this, Haruki realizes that the girl in the picture is his sister and that his parents have been suffering this whole time. When Asahi returns for the first time, he's already a middle schooler and he's aloof and cold towards her. However, he constantly keeps a watch on her to make sure she doesn't disappear again for their mom's sake. Haruki and Asahi are later seen walking together at the end of the series now that she is in the real world for good.

== Media ==
=== Manga ===
Toma began the manga in Shogakukan's shōjo manga magazine, Cheese! on February 24, 2015. Viz Media announced during their Anime Expo 2016 panel that they have licensed the manga.

==== Volumes ====
No.	Original release date	Original ISBN	North America release date	North America ISBN
1	November 26, 2015	978-4-09-137727-2	April 4, 2017	978-1-4215-9255-8
2	December 25, 2015	978-4-09-138046-3	July 4, 2017	978-1-4215-9256-5
3	April 26, 2016	978-4-09-138452-2	October 3, 2017	978-1-4215-9257-2
4	September 26, 2016	978-4-09-138579-6	January 2, 2018	978-1-4215-9507-8
5	January 26, 2017	978-4-09-139130-8	April 3, 2018	978-1-4215-9655-6
6	May 26, 2017	978-4-09-139179-7	July 3, 2018	978-1-4215-9858-1
7	September 26, 2017	978-4-09-139499-6	October 2, 2018	978-1-9747-0187-2
8	January 26, 2018	978-4-09-139873-4	January 1, 2019	978-1-9747-0228-2
9	May 25, 2018	978-4-09-870077-6	April 2, 2019	978-1-9747-0562-7
10	September 26, 2018	978-4-09-870157-5	July 2, 2019	978-1-9747-0503-0
11	January 25, 2019	978-4-09-870256-5	November 5, 2019	978-1-9747-0958-8

== See also ==
- Dawn of the Arcana, another manga series by the same author
- The King's Beast, another manga series by the same author

== Reception ==
On average, The Water Dragon's Bride is often thought to be the least popular series by the author. The age gap between the child and god- and the fact that he somewhat raised her since then- can be problematic for many readers. The series also suffers from the pacing. Many of the problems are either immediately dealt with because of the Water God's interference or they are never addressed again in the series. The main protagonist almost never solves anything on her own merit because of this, so she is often reduced to crying and being saved by another character just in time. There is also little to no substance in the world building or characters that readers sometimes believe that they have no reason to care in depth about them.

The ending is also seen as controversial. Asahi is returned to her world as the Water Dragon God is dying from sharing his power with her. He becomes droplets of water, and the other gods, including the god of darkness, who was introduced late as an enemy, allow him to go to the real world as well. However, he is sent to the past of the real world, and he waits thousands of years in a body of water until Asahi is born. It is later revealed that the series becomes a paradox, as it is his own power that dragged Asahi into the pond when she was a child into the first place, leading her to a life of suffering and conflict in order to meet him and fall in love. After she has gone through all that, and is sent back to her world, her brother (who was born while she was missing for years) mentions hearing her voice coming from the pond in their backyard. She runs back and manages to pull out the god, and they agree to be engaged. However, she is wearing a high school uniform, so she is still a minor. Oddly enough, the god is never actually given a name, so she really does just call him "Water God" or Suijin in the original language.

Despite the negative opinions, it tends to have an average score.
