= From Five to Nine (manga) =

Japanese manga series

- First tankōbon volume cover

5時から9時まで (Go-ji kara Ku-ji made)
- Genre: Romance, drama
- Manga
- Written by: Miki Aihara
- Published by: Shogakukan
- Imprint: Flower Comics
- Magazine: Cheese!
- Original run: January 23, 2010 – March 24, 2020
- Volumes: 16
- Manga

Elevator Orite Hidari: Five to Nine Next Door
- Written by: Miki Aihara
- Published by: Shogakukan
- Imprint: Flower Comics
- Magazine: &Flower; Cheese!
- Original run: September 11, 2020 – June 25, 2024
- Volumes: 3
- Television drama
- 5→9 From Five to Nine

From Five to Nine (Japanese: 5時から9時まで, Hepburn: Go-ji kara Ku-ji made) is a Japanese manga series written and illustrated by Miki Aihara. It was serialized in Shogakukan's shōjo manga magazine Cheese! from January 2010 to March 2020.

A 10-episode television drama adaptation aired on Fuji TV from October to December 2015.

== Publication ==
Written and illustrated by Miki Aihara, From Five to Nine was serialized in Shogakukan's shōjo manga magazine Cheese! from January 23, 2010, to March 24, 2020. Its chapters were collected into sixteen tankōbon volumes from June 25, 2010, to April 24, 2020.

A spin-off manga, titled Elevator Orite Hidari: Five to Nine Next Door, began serialization in Shogakukan's &Flower digital magazine on September 11, 2020. It also began serialization in Cheese! on November 24 the same year. The spin-off ended serialization on June 25, 2024. The spin-off's chapters were collected into three tankōbon volumes released from October 26, 2021, to July 25, 2024.

=== Volume list ===
No.	Release date	ISBN
1	June 25, 2010	978-4-09-133214-1
2	December 24, 2010	978-4-09-133558-6
3	May 26, 2011	978-4-09-133859-4
4	February 24, 2012	978-4-09-134196-9
5	August 24, 2012	978-4-09-134653-7
6	January 25, 2013	978-4-09-134899-9
7	July 26, 2013	978-4-09-135508-9
8	January 24, 2014	978-4-09-135814-1
9	August 26, 2014	978-4-09-136335-0
10	February 26, 2015	978-4-09-136830-0
11	September 25, 2015	978-4-09-137717-3
12	February 26, 2016	978-4-09-138298-6
13	February 24, 2017	978-4-09-139137-7
14	February 26, 2018	978-4-09-139878-9
15	March 26, 2019	978-4-09-870403-3
16	April 24, 2020	978-4-09-870895-6

=== Elevator Orite Hidari: Five to Nine Next Door ===
No.	Release date	ISBN
1	October 26, 2021	978-4-09-871549-7
2	October 26, 2022	978-4-09-871861-0
3	July 25, 2024	978-4-09-872756-8

== Reception ==
By October 2021, the series, including its spin-off, had over 5 million copies in circulation.
