= Motokare Retry =

Japanese manga series

- Cover of the Japanese version of vol. 1, first released on June 26, 2015

モトカレ←リトライ (Motokare Ritorai)
- Genre: Romance
- Manga
- Written by: En Hanaya
- Published by: Shogakukan
- Imprint: Flower Comics
- Magazine: Cheese!
- Original run: February 24, 2015 – January 24, 2017
- Volumes: 7
- Television drama
- Directed by: Chihiro Ikeda; Hajime Hatakeyama
- Written by: Atsumi Dojō; Nana Yamamoto
- Studio: Robot Communications
- Licensed by: Rakuten Viki
- Original network: MBS TV; dTV (special)
- Original run: April 7, 2022 – May 26, 2022
- Episodes: 8
- icon

Motokare Retry (Japanese: モトカレ←リトライ; lit. 'Ex-Boyfriend Retry') is a Japanese manga series by En Hanaya. Motokare Retry was serialized in the monthly shōjo manga magazine Cheese! from February 24, 2015, to January 24, 2017. A live-action television drama adaptation was broadcast from April 7, 2022, to May 26, 2022, (Note: TV Kanagawa broadcast the episodes two hours earlier than MBS TV's scheduled time.) as the 19th entry to MBS TV's programming block Drama Tokku.

== Plot ==
After moving to Tokyo for college, Mitsu Haneki discovers that her next-door neighbor is Kaede Hirako, her ex-boyfriend from middle school. Mitsu and Kaede realize their feelings for each other have not changed, and after clearing up misunderstandings about their break-up, they start dating each other again.

== Characters ==
Mitsu Haneki (羽木 蜜, Haneki Mitsu)
Voiced by: Sayumi Suzushiro (movie comic), Portrayed by: Asuka Kawazu (TV drama)
Mitsu is a college student who has not gotten over her break-up with Kaede in middle school, but she is shocked to discover he is now her next-door neighbor.
Kaede Hirako (平子 楓, Hirako Kaede)
Voiced by: Kōhei Amasaki (movie comic), Portrayed by: Jin Suzuki (TV drama)
Kaede is Mitsu's ex-boyfriend from middle school who was also on the baseball team. In middle school, he asked Mitsu to take a break from their relationship so he could focus on getting back onto the baseball team's starting line-up, to which she interpreted as them breaking up. He is still in love with Mitsu to this day. Kaede is described as having excellent grades and is good at sports. Jin Suzuki, who portrays him in the live-action drama adaptation, stated that he had only played high school students in live-action dramas based on shōjo manga, so he found it challenging to portray the romantic expressions of a high school student turning into college student.
Kazuha Yamashita (山下 和葉, Yamashita Kazuha)
Voiced by: Yoshitaka Yamaya (movie comic), Portrayed by: Jinto Yoshida (TV drama)
Kazuha is Kaede's friend from high school. Despite his lazy demeanor, he earns top scores in class and is highly intuitive about other people's feelings. He falls in love with Mitsu.
Nina Yamashita (山下 仁菜, Yamashita Nina)
Voiced by: Chiyo Tomaru (movie comic), Portrayed by: Enako (TV drama)
Nina is Kazuha's cousin and Kaede's friend from high school. Nina is also Kaede's ex-girlfriend, having dated him briefly in high school and being involved in his first sexual relationship.
Nonoka Yamada (山田 野乃花, Yamada Nonoka)
Portrayed by: Riho Nakamura (TV drama)
Nonoka is Mitsu's best friend. In the live-action drama adaptation, the character was renamed Norika Nonohana (野々花 のりか, Nonohana Norika).

== Media ==
=== Manga ===
Motokare Retry is written and illustrated by En Hanaya. It was serialized in the monthly shōjo manga magazine Cheese! from the April 2015 issue released on February 24, 2024, to the March 2017 issue released on January 24, 2017. The chapters were later released in seven bound volumes by Shogakukan under the Flower Comics imprint.

In the May 2022 issue of Cheese! released on March 24, 2022, Hanaya released a side story for Motokare Retry to celebrate the announcement of the live-action drama adaptation.

| No. | Japanese release date | Japanese ISBN |
|---|---|---|
| 1 | June 26, 2015 | 978-4091373465 |
| 2 | July 24, 2015 | 978-4091377098 |
| 3 | December 25, 2015 | 978-4091377876 |
| 4 | April 26, 2016 | 978-4091384492 |
| 5 | August 26, 2016 | 978-4091385765 |
| 6 | December 26, 2016 | 978-4091387899 |
| 7 | March 24, 2017 | 978-4091391391 |

=== Television drama ===
A live-action television series adaptation was announced on March 15, 2022, as the 19th entry to MBS TV's late-night Thursday television block, Drama Tokku. The series aired on MBS TV from April 8, 2022, (Note: MBS lists the broadcast date as April 7, 2022, at 00:59, which is April 8, 2022, at 12:59 AM.) to May 27, 2022, for 8 episodes. Other broadcasts include TV Kanagawa, Chiba TV, TV Saitama, Tochigi Television, and Gunma Television. TV Kanagawa broadcast the episodes from April 7 to May 26, 2022, two hours earlier than its scheduled time on MBS TV.

The series stars Jin Suzuki as Kaede and Asuka Kawazu as Mitsu. Regarding the casting, Hanaya, the original author of the manga, stated that Suzuki and Kawazu "fit the image" she had in mind for Kaede and Mitsu. Additional cast members include Milk member Jinto Yoshida as Kazuha and Enako as Nina, and Riho Nakamura as Norika Nonohana, and Hidekazu Mashima as Mitsu's father. Chikara Honda plays Professor Watanuki, an original character made for the drama, who appears as an imaginary figure in Kaede and Mitsu's daydreams.

The drama adaptation is directed by Chihiro Ikeda and Hajime Hatakeyama, with Atsumi Dojō and Nana Yamamoto writing the script. It is produced by Robot Communications. The opening theme is "My Boy" by Chilli Beans. and the ending theme is "Akai" by Ezoshika Gourmet Club.

==== Episodes ====
| No. | Title | Directed by | Written by | Original release date |
|---|---|---|---|---|
| 1 | "Lovesickness"; Transliteration: "Koiwazura" (Japanese: 恋煩い) | Chihiro Ikeda | Atsumi Dojō | April 7, 2022 |
| 2 | "Strategy"; Transliteration: "Sakusen" (Japanese: 作戦) | Chihiro Ikeda | Atsumi Dojō | April 14, 2022 |
| 3 | "What's Their Relationship?"; Transliteration: "Futari no Kankei wa?" (Japanese: 二人の関係は?) | Chihiro Ikeda | Atsumi Dojō, Nana Yamamoto | April 21, 2022 |
| 4 | "Rival of Love"; Transliteration: "Koi no Raibaru" (Japanese: 恋のライバル) | Hajime Hatakeyama | Atsumi Dojō, Nana Yamamoto | April 28, 2022 |
| 5 | "Love Triangle"; Transliteration: "Sankaku Kankei" (Japanese: 三角関係) | Hajime Hatakeyama | Atsumi Dojō | May 5, 2022 |
| 6 | "Revenge of the Ex-Girlfriend"; Transliteration: "Motokano no Gyakushū" (Japanese: モトカノの逆襲) | Hajime Hatakeyama | Atsumi Dojō | May 12, 2022 |
| 7 | "About the Future"; Transliteration: "Shōrai ni Tsuite" (Japanese: 将来について) | Chihiro Ikeda | Atsumi Dojō | May 19, 2022 |
| 8 | "Going Forward with Retrying"; Transliteration: "Ritorai no Sono Saki ni" (Japanese: リトライのその先に) | Chihiro Ikeda | Atsumi Dojō | May 26, 2022 |

==== Special ====
A two-part spin-off episode of the drama adaptation, titled Motokare Retry: Our True Feelings That She Doesn't Know (モトカレ←リトライ ～カノジョが知らない僕たちの本音～, Motokare Ritorai: Kanojo ga Shiranai Boku-tachi no Honne) was released on the streaming service dTV as part of its original drama programming. The series focuses on Kaede's life in high school, with the original cast from the television drama returning to reprise their roles. Unlike the original drama adaptation, the spin-off episode was written to portray "conversations between men" and male friendship through Kaede and Kazuha. The first part was released on May 27, 2022, and the second part was released on June 3, 2022. (Note: dTV lists the broadcast date as May 26, 2022, at 25:39, which is May 27, 2022, at 1:39 AM. The second part is listed with the broadcast date of June 2, 2022, at 24:00, which is June 3, 2022, at 12:00 AM.)

=== Movie comic ===
A movie comic, featuring voiceovers to comic panels, was broadcast on dTV and YouTube on May 21, 2022, to promote the release of the two-part special, Motokare Retry: Our True Feelings That She Doesn't Know.
