= Chilli Beans. =

Japanese all-female band formed in 2019

Chilli Beans. チリビーンズ
- Origin: Tokyo, Japan
- Genres: Pop rock; indie rock; j-pop
- Years active: 2019–present
- Labels: Spicy Records; A.S.A.B
- Members: Moto; Maika; Lily
- Website: https://chilli-beans.com/

Chilli Beans. (Japanese: チリビーンズ, Hepburn: Chiribiinzu) is a Japanese band formed in 2019, consisting of members Moto (vocals), Maika (bass and vocals), and Lily (guitar and vocals). All members met while attending the same music school in Tokyo, where they formed the band, naming it after Red Hot Chili Peppers.

Their first EP "d a n c i n g a l o n e" (2021) peaked at No. 38 on Oricon's weekly album charts, while its opening track "Lemonade" topped Spotify's "Viral 50 – Japan" playlist. The band's fourth single "Rose"(2023) ranked No. 1 on Billboard Japan Heatseekers chart. They have released a total of 4 EPs and 2 studio albums. The band's music has been featured on various Japanese TV shows and commercials including the anime series "One Piece".

== History ==
=== 2019–2021: Formation and early works ===
Moto, Maika and Lily all met while attending "Ongaku Juku Voice" music school in Tokyo, where they were enrolled in the singer-songwriter course. In 2019, they formed a band following a suggestion from their teacher. The initial portion of the band's name, Chilli Beans, was inspired by Red Hot Chilli Peppers, as they felt that they shared the American's band's forward-looking approach to music. The latter component, 'beans', was incorporated to signify the band's potential for growth in the future. Shortly after the band's formation Lily switched over to "DTM course" to learn music production. The band started work on new material, completing their first song "Lemonade" in August of the same year. The song was jointly written by all members based on a chord progression made by Lily. While discussing the song during their class, their classmate Vaundy suggested some modifications, and subsequently co-arranged the final version of the song. He would go on to collaborate with the band on future projects.

Chilli Beans. released their debut EP titled "d a n c i n g a l o n e" in August 2021, debuting at rank 38 on Oricon's weekly album charts. The first track from the EP "Lemonade" took the number one spot on Spotify's "Viral 50 – Japan" playlist. Music video for the song "Lemonade" was also released simultaneously, which was followed by a music video for "Shekirara" in November of the same year. Their 2nd single "Andron" was released on 24 November, exclusively on digital platforms. The band's 2nd EP "Daydream was released in March 2022. It peaked at #43 on Oricon's weekly charts. In the same month, their first set of two-man live shows titled "Dancing Room" were held at Tokyo and Osaka. A second set of two-man live shows were held in Tokyo on 18 June in Tokyo and 25 September in Osaka, with the latter being rescheduled after a member was tested positive for COVID-19.

=== 2022–2023: Chilli Beans. ===
A new single "My Boy", was released a digitally in April 2022. The song was adopted as the opening theme for the TV drama adaptation of "Motokare Retry". The band's official fan club was launched on 19 June. Their first full album "Chilli Beans." was released in July 2022. The song "School" from the album reached the top spot of USEN request J-pop hot 30. The group embarked on their first one-man tour "Hi Tour" which lasted from 2 November to 14 December. The tour included shows in 8 cities across Japan. During the tour, a Christmas themed song "Daylight" was released as a digital single. At the 15th "CD Shop Awards" held by the Japan CD shop clerk's association the album "Chilli Beans." won the blue award.

The third EP by the band "mixtape" was released in February 2023. One of the tracks from the EP, "Rose" had already been released as a digital single in January prior to the EP's release. The song reached number one spot on Billboard Japan Heatseeker songs chart. During a concert titled "Dancing Room 003" held at Nanba Hatch Osaka with WurtS on 10 March, a new song " Time Lag" was performed. The song was a collaboration between Moto and WurtS and was written shortly before the performance. It was released on streaming platforms on the same day. On May 26 the 3rd single by the band "You N me" was released which was also adopted as the theme of "Play It Cool, Guys", a Japanese TV drama series.

The band's 4th single "for you" was released on 9 August. An accompanying one-man tour title "for you TOUR" was also announced simultaneously and held from August to September. The group also participated in a promotional campaign by the restaurant "Otoshoko Osaka" from 9 to 24 September. The campaign saw the band members formulating a new dish which was included in the restaurant's menu.

=== 2024–present: Welcome to my Castle ===
Chilli Beans' second studio album "Welcome to my Castle" was released on 13 December 2023. A song from the album, "I love you" was adopted as the ending theme for the Fuji TV drama "Don't waste your time lovers". Music video for the song "Welcome" was also released at the same time. The song track was also available as a free download for "au Smart Pass Premium" users. The band performed at Nippon Budokan in February 2024. The live video of the performance later released on DVD/Blue-Ray as "Chilli Beans. Welcome to my Castle at Budokan". Before the release a commemorative panel exhibition was held from 4 to 10 June at Tower Records Shinjuku store in Tokyo. In June 2024 "open my mind live house tour" saw the band performing in Tokyo, Nagoya and Osaka. During the tour a new song titled "Mum" was performed. It was later released as a single on 26 June 2024.

== Members ==
=== Current members ===
- Moto – lead vocals (2019–present)
- Lily – guitar, vocals (2019–present)
- Maika – bass, vocals (2019–present)

=== Support musicians ===
- Yuumi – drums (2021–present)

== Discography ==
=== Studio albums ===
Title	Album details	Peak chart positions
Title	Album details	JPN Oricon
Chilli Beans.	Released: 13 July 2022; Format: CD+DVD, CD+BD	28
Welcome to My Castle	Released: 13 December 2023; Format: CD+DVD, CD+BD	31

=== EPs ===
Title	Album details	Peak chart positions
Title	Album details	JPN Oricon
d a n c i n g a l o n e	Released: 25 August 2021	38
Daydream	Released: 2 March 2022	43
mixtape	Released: 1 February 2023; Format: CD+DVD	24
for you	Released: 9 August 2023; Format: CD+DVD	35
