= Uchi no Inu ga Koneko Hiroimashita =

Japanese manga series

- First tankōbon volume cover

うちの犬が子ネコ拾いました
- Manga
- Written by: Sayuri Tatsuyama
- Published by: Shogakukan
- Imprint: Flower Comics
- Magazine: Cheese!
- Original run: April 24, 2017 – present
- Volumes: 9

Uchi no Inu ga Koneko Hiroimashita (うちの犬が子ネコ拾いました) is a Japanese manga series written and illustrated by Sayuri Tatsuyama. It began serialization in Shogakukan's shōjo manga magazine Cheese! in April 2017.

== Synopsis ==
Peritas, a dog belonging to a novelist, picks up two stray kittens without the novelist's knowledge. The series focuses on the everyday adventures of Peritas and those two kittens.

== Characters ==
Peritas (ペリタス, Peritasu)
Voiced by: Hiroki Yasumoto (voice comic)
Kip (キップ, Kippu)
Voiced by: Shōya Chiba (voice comic)
Maro Omo (マロ・主)
Voiced by: Daisuke Nagumo (voice comic)

== Media ==
=== Manga ===
Written and illustrated by Sayuri Tatsuyama, Uchi no Inu ga Koneko Hiroimashita began serialization in Shogakukan's shōjo manga magazine Cheese! on April 24, 2017. Its chapters have been collected in nine tankōbon volumes as of September 2026.

No.	Release date	ISBN
1	July 26, 2018	978-4-09-870226-8
2	June 26, 2019	978-4-09-870544-3
3	August 26, 2020	978-4-09-871143-7
4	July 26, 2021	978-4-09-871407-0
5	July 26, 2022	978-4-09-871761-3
6	June 26, 2023	978-4-09-872282-2
7	June 26, 2024	978-4-09-872634-9
8	August 26, 2025	978-4-09-873086-5
9	September 25, 2026	978-4-09-873502-0

=== Other ===
A voice comic adaptation was uploaded to the Ciao YouTube channel on April 30, 2021. It featured performances from Hiroki Yasumoto and Shōya Chiba.

== Reception ==
By August 2025, the series had over 600,000 copies in circulation.

The series was nominated for the 71st Shogakukan Manga Awards in 2025.
