= Kaiju Club =

- Title card
- Genre: Drama
- Developed by: Kensaku Sakai
- Written by: Kōta Fukihara; Yu Tomisaka
- Directed by: Takashi Sumida; Takahiro Aoyama
- Starring: Kanata Hongō; Ryusei Yokohama; Masato Yano; Ryo Kato; Shogo Yamaguchi; Tokio Emoto; Muga Tsukaji; Fumika Baba
- Opening theme: "Recollections" by Riko Sasaki
- Ending theme: "GEEKDOM" by Traffic Light
- Composer: NAOTO
- Country of origin: Japan
- No. of episodes: 4

Production
- Producer: Keiko Matsumoto
- Production company: Mainichi Broadcasting System

Original release
- Network: MBS; TBS
- Release: June 4 – June 26, 2017

Kaiju Club (怪獣倶楽部〜空想特撮青春記〜, Kaijū Kurabu Kūsō Tokusatsu Seishunki; lt. "Monster Club: Fictional Special Effects Youth Chronicle") is a four-episode late night Japanese television drama series. The series received collaboration with Tsuburaya Productions for the production and appearance of Ultra Monsters in the series.

The series takes place in mid-1970s and focuses on club members who are devoted to the Kaiju of Tokusatsu shows while trying to self-publish a magazine that deals with the topic. Each episode features the guest appearance of monsters from Ultra Series.

== Production ==
Kaiju Club was produced by Keiko Matsumoto. The series aired four episodes, with episodes one, three and four being written by Kōta Fukihara, while episode two was written by Yu Tomisaka. Episodes one and three were directed by Takashi Sumida, while episodes two and four were directed by Takahiro Aoyama. NAOTO composed the music.

== Characters ==
- Ryōta (リョウタ): The main protagonist. A 22 years old college student and an ace member of Kaiju Club.
- Katsuo (カツオ): 17 years old. A high school student who is rather mature despite his age.
- Yuriko (ユリコ): 22 years old. An honorable college student.
- Shingo (シンゴ): 22 years old. An otaku who has a habit of fixing other's mistake.
- Yūsuke (ユウスケ): 24 years old. An artistic member of Kaiju Club who can draw monsters.
- Nishi (ニシ): 33 years old. A salaryman who supports the Kaiju Club. He is also knowledgeable in musics.
- Jō (ジョー): 33 years old. Number 2 member of Kaiju Club who often gave ideas to others. He is also a magazine writer.
- Cap (キャップ, Kyappu): Age unknown, he is the mysterious founder of the Kaiju Club.

=== Ultra Monsters ===
- Alien Metron (メトロン星人, Metoron Seijin):
- Alien Guts (ガッツ星人, Gattsu Seijin):
- Zetton (ゼットン):
- Alien Ghos (ゴース星人, Gōsu Seijin):

== Cast ==
- Kanata Hongō as Ryōta
- Ryusei Yokohama as Katsuo
- Masato Yano as Shingo
- Ryo Kato as Yūsuke
- Shogo Yamaguchi as Nishi
- Tokio Emoto as Jō
- Muga Tsukaji as Cap
- Fumika Baba as Yuriko
