= Yakuza Lover =

Japanese manga series by Nozomi Mino

- Cover of the first volume

恋と弾丸 (Koi to Dangan)
- Genre: Romance
- Manga
- Written by: Nozomi Mino
- Published by: Shogakukan
- English publisher: NA: Viz Media
- Magazine: Premium Cheese!; Cheese!
- Original run: March 5, 2018 – June 24, 2022
- Volumes: 12
- Television drama
- Directed by: Smith; Kenjiro Tsubakimoto; Hiroto Totsuka
- Written by: Sorami Date
- Licensed by: Disney Platform Distribution
- Original network: MBS TV
- Original run: October 27, 2022 – December 23, 2022
- Episodes: 9

Yakuza Lover (Japanese: 恋と弾丸, Hepburn: Koi to Dangan; lit. "Love and Bullets", titled Dangerous Lover in Japan) is a Japanese manga series written and illustrated by Nozomi Mino. It was serialized in Shogakukan's Premium Cheese! from March 2018 to March 2019 and in Cheese! from April 2019 to June 2022. As of November 2022, the series' individual chapters have been collected into twelve volumes. A live-action television drama adaptation aired from October to December 2022.

== Media ==
=== Manga ===
Written and illustrated by Nozomi Mino, the series began serialization in Shogakukan's Premium Cheese! magazine on March 5, 2018. In April 2019, the series moved to the Cheese! magazine. The series completed its serialization on June 24, 2022. An epilogue chapter is set to be released in August 2022. As of November 2022, the series' individual chapters have been collected into twelve tankōbon volumes.

In October 2020, Viz Media announced that they licensed the series for English publication.

==== Volume list ====
No.	Original release date	Original ISBN	English release date	English ISBN
1	February 26, 2019	978-4-09-870395-1	June 1, 2021	978-1-97-472055-2
2	May 24, 2019	978-4-09-870486-6	September 7, 2021	978-1-97-472063-7
3	September 26, 2019	978-4-09-870611-2	December 7, 2021	978-1-97-472064-4
4	January 24, 2020	978-4-09-870797-3	March 1, 2022	978-1-97-472065-1
5	May 26, 2020	978-4-09-871001-0	June 14, 2022	978-1-97-472419-2
6	September 25, 2020	978-4-09-871079-9	September 13, 2022	978-1-97-472420-8
7	January 26, 2021	978-4-09-871249-6	December 13, 2022	978-1-9747-3105-3
8	May 26, 2021	978-4-09-871319-6	March 14, 2023	978-1-9747-3106-0
9	September 24, 2021	978-4-09-871416-2	June 13, 2023	978-1-9747-3708-6
10	January 26, 2022	978-4-09-871571-8	September 12, 2023	978-1-9747-4052-9
11	May 26, 2022	978-4-09-871642-5	December 12, 2023	978-1-9747-4114-4
12	November 25, 2022	978-4-09-871841-2; 978-4-09-943120-4 (SE)	March 12, 2024	978-1-9747-4331-5

=== Live-action ===
A live-action television drama adaptation was announced in June 2022. The series is set to be directed by Smith, Kenjiro Tsubakimoto, and Hiroto Totsuka, with Sorami Date writing the scripts and Yuta Furukawa and Fumika Baba performing the leads. It aired on MBS TV's Drama Tokku programming block from October 27, 2022, to December 23, 2022. Disney Platform Distribution licensed the drama for an international release.

== Reception ==
Caitlin Moore from Anime News Network praised the sex scenes and their emphasis on consensuallity, while also criticizing the story and artwork. Sheena McNeil from Sequential Tart praised the main characters and their relationship, though she also felt the art gave too much focus to Yuri.

The series was nominated for the 65th Shogakukan Manga Award in the shōjo manga category in 2019. The third volume had an initial print run of 170,000 copies, being the eleventh largest print run of any Shogakukan title in 2019. The series has sold 4.5 million copies.
