= Cheese! =

Japanese manga magazine

- Magazine cover for March 2007
- Categories: Shōjo manga
- Frequency: Monthly
- Circulation: 8,000; (July–September 2026)
- First issue: July 1996
- Company: Shogakukan
- Country: Japan
- Based in: Tokyo
- Language: Japanese
- Website: cheese.shogakukan.co.jp

Cheese! (Japanese: チーズ!, Hepburn: Chīzu) is a monthly Japanese shōjo manga magazine under the publication of Shogakukan. In their official website, they also refer to themselves as Monthly Cheese!

The magazine caters to young female readers. The theme of the featured manga revolves around romance and mature relationships. The serialization is said to be running as of 1996 and is sister comics to Shogakukan's other magazines like Sho-Comi.

== Manga series listed in Cheese! ==
=== Current ===
- Uchi no Inu ga Koneko Hiroimashita (2017)
- Ore wa Idol wo Yametai (2023)

=== Past ===
- Dawn of the Arcana (2003–2013)
- Honey Hunt (2006–2009)
- Pin to Kona (2009–2015)
- Kanojo wa Uso o Aishisugiteru (2009–2017)
- From Five to Nine (2010–2020)
- 37.5°C no Namida (2013–2022)
- Coffee & Vanilla (2015–2024)
- The Water Dragon's Bride (2015–2019)
- Motokare Retry (2015–2017)
- Namete, Kajitte, Tokidoki Medete (2016-2022)
- The King's Beast (2019–2025)
- Yakuza Lover (2019–2022)
- Hey Sensei, Don't You Know? (2020–2022)
- Elevator Orite Hidari: Five to Nine Next Door (2020–2024)
- Snow Angel (2023-2024)
- Suteinu ni Honey Toast
- Bonnou Puzzle
- 1 Manbun no 1
- Watashi wa Tensai o Katte Iru.
- Kurogenji Monogatari – Hana to Miruramu
