= The Way of the Househusband =

Manga series by Kousuke Oono and its adaptations

- First tankōbon volume cover, featuring Tatsu

極主夫道 (Gokushufudō)
- Genre: Action; Comedy; Slice of life
- Manga
- Written by: Kousuke Oono
- Published by: Shinchosha
- English publisher: NA: Viz Media
- Imprint: Bunch Comics
- Magazine: Kurage Bunch
- Original run: February 23, 2018 – present
- Volumes: 17
- Television drama
- Directed by: Tōichirō Rutō
- Written by: Manabu Uda
- Music by: Eishi Segawa
- Studio: ytv
- Original network: NNS (ytv, Nippon TV)
- Original run: October 11, 2020 – December 13, 2020
- Episodes: 10
- Original net animation
- Directed by: Chiaki Kon
- Written by: Susumu Yamakawa
- Music by: Gin
- Studio: J.C.Staff
- Licensed by: Netflix
- Released: April 8, 2021 – January 1, 2023
- Runtime: 16–19 minutes
- Episodes: 15
- Live-action film
- Directed by: Tōichirō Rutō
- Studio: Sony Pictures Entertainment Japan
- Released: June 3, 2022
- icon

The Way of the Househusband (Japanese: 極主夫道, Hepburn: Gokushufudō; lit. 'Extreme Way of the Househusband') is a Japanese manga series written and illustrated by Kousuke Oono. Published in the online manga magazine Kurage Bunch since 2018, The Way of the Househusband follows an ex-yakuza member who retires from crime to become a househusband. The series was adapted into a live-action television drama by Nippon TV in 2020.

An original net animation (ONA) series produced by J.C.Staff was released from April to October 2021 on Netflix. A second season premiered in January 2023.

== Synopsis ==
Tatsu, an infamous and feared yakuza boss nicknamed "the Immortal Dragon", retires from crime to become a househusband so that he can support Miku, his kyariaūman wife. The episodic series depicts a variety of comedic scenarios, typically wherein Tatsu's banal domestic work as a househusband is juxtaposed against his intimidating personality and appearance, and his frequent run-ins with former yakuza associates and rivals.

== Characters ==
Tatsu (龍)
Voiced by: Kenjiro Tsuda (promotional video and anime) (Japanese); Jonah Scott (English)
Portrayed by: Hiroshi Tamaki
A former yakuza boss who applies the skill and intensity he possessed as a crime lord to housework and domestic tasks as a househusband.
Miku (美久)
Voiced by: Maaya Sakamoto (promotional video), Shizuka Itō (anime) (Japanese); Laura Post (English)
Portrayed by: Haruna Kawaguchi
A career-focused designer with a strong work ethic, and Tatsu's wife. She is secretly an otaku and obsessed with magical girl anime, notably a parody of Pretty Cure named "Policure".
Masa (雅)
Voiced by: Kenichi Suzumura (promotional video), Kazuyuki Okitsu (anime) (Japanese); Andres Paul Ramacho (English)
Portrayed by: Jun Shison (drama)
An underling in Tatsu's former gang. He often unwittingly comes to assist Tatsu in his chores and errands.
Torajirō (虎二郎)
Voiced by: Yoshimasa Hosoya (promotional video and anime) (Japanese); Ben Pronsky (English)
Portrayed by: Kenichi Takitō (drama)
A former yakuza boss. Tatsu dismantled his gang while he was in prison, and he now owns a food truck that sells crêpes. He still has a strong rivalry with Tatsu, even when it is about home chores.
Hibari Torii (酉井雲雀)
Voiced by: Atsuko Tanaka (anime) (Japanese); Melissa Greenspan (English)
Portrayed by: Izumi Inamori
A former yakuza leader. After her gang was disbanded, she started working at a grocery store. In the live-action she is named Hibari Eguchi and is married to Tatsu's former boss.
Gin (銀)
Voiced by: M.A.O (anime) (Japanese); Laura Stahl (English)
Portrayed by: Yuki Kaji (drama spinoff)
Tatsu and Miku's cat. He has many adventures on his own walking around the neighborhood and meeting other animals.
Young Yakuza Lieutenant (むヤクザの若頭)
Voiced by: Jun Fukushima (anime) (Japanese); Billy Kametz (season 1), Stephen Fu (season 2) (English)
Chairperson (の会長)
Voiced by: Kimiko Saitō (anime) (Japanese); Barbara Goodson (English)
Policemen (をする警官)
Voiced by: Masashi Nogawa and Junichi Yanagita (anime) (Japanese); Keith Silverstein (English)
Portrayed by: Junpei Yasui and Yūta Furukawa (drama)
A couple of policemen. One of them recognizes Tatsu as a dangerous yakuza and tries to find evidence to put him in jail, leading to hilarious mistakes.
Former Yakuza Boss (組長のおやじ)
Voiced by: Hōchū Ōtsuka (anime) (Japanese); Jason Marnocha (English)
Portrayed by: Naoto Takenaka (drama)
Tatsu's former boss in the yakuza. He tries to make Tatsu come back to his own ways only to discover how skilled Tatsu became as a househusband when Tatsu fed his dog with a tasty plate he cooked himself. In the drama he is named Kikujiro Eguchi and is married to Hibari.
Bob (ボブ, Bobu)
Voiced by: Tomokazu Sugita (anime) (Japanese); Gogo Lomo-David (English)
An immigrant that lives in the same building as Tatsu. He nearly suffocates from an incident where he tried to make a BBQ in his own home.
Gōda (剛田)
Voiced by: Subaru Kimura (promotional video and anime) (Japanese); Kaiji Tang (English)
Koharu (小春)
Voiced by: Ami Koshimizu (Japanese); Ryan Bartley (English)
Portrayed by: Marika Matsumoto (film)
An employee at the Lovely Donuts fast food chain and the little sister of Torajirō. In the film she is a gang leader.
Yukari Ōmae (大前ゆかり)
Portrayed by: Tina Tamashiro (drama)
A college student working at a cafe, she is a character original to the drama.
Himawari (ひまわり)
Portrayed by: Tamaki Shiratori (drama)
Miku's daughter and Tatsu's stepdaughter, she is a character original to the drama. She is an elementary school student who is often more serious than her parents.

== Media ==
=== Manga ===
The Way of the Househusband, written and illustrated by Kousuke Oono, was initially published on the Shinchosha's online manga magazine Kurage Bunch as a five chapter limited series from February 23 to March 23, 2018, but became popular enough to be serialized as an ongoing series, starting on May 18 of the same year. It has been collected into seventeen tankōbon volumes by Shinchosha.

In North America, Viz Media announced it had acquired the rights to publish an English-language translation of the series in February 2019, the first volume of which was published in September of that year.

==== Volumes ====
No.	Original release date	Original ISBN	English release date	English ISBN
1	August 8, 2018	978-4-10-772104-4	September 17, 2019	978-1-9747-1389-9
2	December 7, 2018	978-4-10-772137-2	January 21, 2020	978-1-9747-1044-7
3	June 8, 2019	978-4-10-772191-4	May 19, 2020	978-1-9747-1346-2
4	December 9, 2019	978-4-10-772238-6	September 15, 2020	978-1-9747-1767-5
5	June 9, 2020	978-4-10-772291-1	May 18, 2021	978-1-9747-2177-1
6	November 9, 2020	978-4-10-772338-3	September 21, 2021	978-1-9747-2461-1
7	March 9, 2021	978-4-10-772368-0	January 18, 2022	978-1-9747-2728-5
8	September 9, 2021	978-4-10-772419-9	August 16, 2022	978-1-9747-3223-4
9	March 9, 2022	978-4-10-772482-3	February 21, 2023	978-1-9747-3615-7
10	July 7, 2022	978-4-10-772516-5	August 22, 2023	978-1-9747-3876-2
11	January 7, 2023	978-4-10-772562-2	February 20, 2024	978-1-9747-4310-0
12	July 7, 2023	978-4-10-772619-3	August 20, 2024	978-1-9747-4638-5
13	December 8, 2023	978-4-10-772672-8	March 18, 2025	978-1-9747-5199-0
14	May 9, 2024	978-4-10-772714-5	August 19, 2025	978-1-9747-5534-9
15	January 8, 2025	978-4-10-772788-6	January 20, 2026	978-1-9747-6130-2
16	October 9, 2025	978-4-10-772878-4	November 17, 2026	978-1-9747-6648-2
17	June 9, 2026	978-4-10-772950-7	—	—

=== Promotional videos ===
External videos
- Vol. 1 promotional video, YouTube
- Vol. 2 promotional video, YouTube
- Vol. 3 promotional video, YouTube
- Vol. 4 promotional video, YouTube
- Live action promotional video, YouTube
- Vol. 5 promotional video, YouTube

Multiple motion comic videos have been produced to promote the release of the series' tankōbon volumes. The videos feature Kenjiro Tsuda as the voice of Tatsu, Kenichi Suzumura as the voice of Masa, Yoshimasa Hosoya as the voice of Torajiro, and Subaru Kimura as the voice of G-Goda.

In December 2019, a live-action promotional video adapting scenes from The Way of the Househusband was produced to commemorate the series reaching 1.2 million copies in print. The video stars Tsuda reprising his role as Tatsu and Maaya Sakamoto as Miku, and is co-directed by Tsuda and Hayato Yazaki.

=== Television drama ===
On July 8, 2020, Nippon TV announced that it would adapt The Way of the Househusband into a live-action television drama, which premiered in October 2020. The series stars Hiroshi Tamaki as Tatsu, is produced by FINE Entertainment, and features Tōichirō Rutō as director and Manabu Uda as screenplay writer.

==== Episodes ====
No.	Title	Original release date
1	"The Legendary Gangster Devotes His Life To Household Chores!" (Japanese: 伝説の極道が家事に命をかける 仁義なきヒューマン任俠コメディ)	October 11, 2020
2	"Sweets confrontation without morality!" (Japanese: 玉木宏が元極道の専業主夫に！ 仁義なきスイーツ対決&主婦抗爭！)	October 18, 2020
3	"The Strongest Husband Joins the PTA!?" (Japanese: 最強主夫がPTAに入門!? ハロウィンに仮裝カチコミ！)	October 25, 2020
4	"A Parental Mess!? Immortal Catch & A Couple's Marriage Secret" (Japanese: 両親がガサ入れ!? 不死身のキャッチボール&夫婦の結婚秘話)	November 1, 2020
5	"A Couple's Secret Marriage Story!" (Japanese: 知られざる夫婦の結婚秘話! 最後まで見逃さないでください)	November 8, 2020
6	"The Strongest Husband's Apprentice! Spartan Training!" (Japanese: 最強主夫に弟子入り! スパルタ家事修業&デートにカチコミ!)	November 15, 2020
7	"Geek Love Explosion! A Big Blunder on a Rainy Day!" (Japanese: オタク愛が爆発! フィギュア抗爭! まさかの大失態で大奔走!)	November 22, 2020
8	"Desperate! Attacked by the Sweets Gang!" (Japanese: 絶體絶命! スイーツギャング襲來&婦人會の最強ラスボス參戦)	November 29, 2020
9	"Finally the Climax! My Beloved Daughter Disappears...A Family in Crisis!?" (Japanese: ついにクライマックス! 愛する娘が失蹤...家族崩壊の危機!?)	December 6, 2020
10	"Thank you Dragon...Goodbye Dragon..." (Japanese: ありがとう龍... さようなら龍... 笑いと涙の最後のカチコミ!)	December 13, 2020

On July 29, 2021, Netflix announced that they would be releasing their own live-action adaptation special titled The Ingenuity of the Househusband. This special was released on August 29, 2021, starring Kenjiro Tsuda as himself, who previously voiced Tatsu in the anime adaptation and manga promotional videos.

=== Anime ===
At the Netflix Anime Festival on October 26, 2020, an original net animation (ONA) anime series adaptation of The Way of the Househusband was announced. The series is produced by J.C.Staff and directed by Chiaki Kon, with Susumu Yamakawa handling the series' scripts. Kenjiro Tsuda reprised his role as Tatsu from the manga promotional videos. The series was released on April 8, 2021. A second part of the series was released on October 7, 2021. The opening theme is "Shufu no Michi" (The Path of the Househusband), while the ending theme is "Gokushufukaidō" (The Highway of the Househusband), both performed by Uchikubigokumon-Dōkōkai. A second season was announced at the Netflix Tudum Japan event on September 25, 2022. It premiered on January 1, 2023.

==== Episodes ====
===== Season 1 (2021) =====
No. overall	No. in season	Title	Original release date
Part 1
1	1	"Episode 1"	April 8, 2021
Miku rushes off to work but forgets her bento. Tatsu tracks down a Policure Blu-ray for Miku's birthday. Gin takes a walk around the neighborhood.
2	2	"Episode 2"	April 8, 2021
Masa realizes that housewives – and househusbands – have a lot in common with the yakuza. Tatsu takes a yoga class and thoroughly enjoys himself.
3	3	"Episode 3"	April 8, 2021
Tatsu and Masa bump into Torajirō, a fellow ex-gangster now running a crepe truck. The cops grow suspicious of Tatsu's balcony herb garden.
4	4	"Episode 4"	April 8, 2021
Miku's dad tries to bond with Tatsu over a game of catch. A cockroach infiltrates the apartment. The Immortal Claus stops by a kids' Christmas party.
5	5	"Episode 5"	April 8, 2021
Tatsu takes a part-time job at a cafe. Then he bumps into a deceased yakuza boss's wife, who is now working at the supermarket. It's Tatsu's birthday!
Part 2
6	1	"Episode 6"	October 7, 2021
While at the mall, Tatsu catches a live Policure show. Later, he goes on a date with Miku to an amusement park, then takes a trip to the beach.
7	2	"Episode 7"	October 7, 2021
Torajirō hits up Tatsu for some street-level information on the latest craze: bubble tea. Tatsu takes Masa on a confusing trip to the 100-yen shop.
8	3	"Episode 8"	October 7, 2021
Tatsu gets pulled into a rap battle, then enters a Halloween costume contest with Miku. Things get intense during a trip to a buffet restaurant.
9	4	"Episode 9"	October 7, 2021
A battle ensues inside Tatsu's body when he catches a fever. Masa stops by for New Year's. In a baking class, Tatsu drives home the value of heart.
10	5	"Episode 10"	October 7, 2021
To buy Miku a limited edition Policure DVD, Tatsu has to memorize a confusing discount code catchphrase. Tatsu and Miku dogsit; Gin takes another walk.

===== Season 2 (2023) =====
No. overall	No. in season	Title	Original release date
11	1	"Episode 1"	January 1, 2023
Miku needs to eat her way through a huge pile of pastries. Tatsu's no match for the typhoon. Then, Tatsu, Miku and Masa go camping.
12	2	"Episode 2"	January 1, 2023
Tatsu gets intimidated at a meeting of women's group leaders. Gokudon visits a little girl in the hospital. Miku finds Tatsu collapsed on the floor!
13	3	"Episode 3"	January 1, 2023
Torajiro gets a formidable rival – his sister. It's snowing! The popcorn is popped, but Tatsu, Miku and Masa can't decide on what DVD to watch.
14	4	"Episode 4"	January 1, 2023
Tatsu gives Miku pointers on how to play golf. A group of scary looking guys walk into the woods. Tatsu, Miku and Masa can't take the heat.
15	5	"Episode 5"	January 1, 2023
Little Suzu refuses to eat her veggies. To really get rid of weeds, you've got to pull them up by the roots. Tatsu and Torajiro have a bug fight.

=== Film ===
On November 3, 2021, Sony Pictures Entertainment Japan announced a live-action film set to be released on Summer 2022, with Tōichirō Rutō returning as director. Hiroshi Tamaki, Haruna Kawaguchi, Jun Shison, Tamaki Shiratori, Naoto Takenaka, Izumi Inamori, Kenichi Takitō, Yūta Furukawa, Junpei Yasui, Tina Tamashiro, Megumi, and Michiko Tanaka will also return as their characters from the television drama. On February 24, 2022, it was revealed that Kōtarō Yoshida as Kondō, Yumi Adachi as Shiraishi-sensei, Marika Matsumoto as Koharu, Kenta Izuka as Yamamoto, Tomoko Fujita as Katō, Kunito Watanabe as Kazuma and Yua Shinkawa as Kasumi joined the cast.

== Reception ==
=== Critical reception ===
The Way of the Househusband has been positively received by critics. Reviewing the first volume of the series for Polygon, writer Julia Lee called The Way of the Househusband "the perfect blend of comedy and action" and "a nice, silly pick-me-up manga." Anime News Network gave the series 4.5 out of 5 stars, calling it "confident and expertly paced, with gorgeous artwork and perfect comic timing." Conversely, Reuben Baron of Comic Book Resources summarized the series as having a "cute premise, but not one with a ton of variation", though he offered praise for the quality of its art.

The anime series, while originally highly anticipated, was heavily criticized for its limited animation, which resembled a motion comic rather than anime. Meanwhile, in the Chinese version which was released on bilibili, the tattoos were completely removed due to television censorship in China.

=== Sales ===
By December 2019, The Way of the Househusband had 1.2 million copies in print. In Oricon's sales rankings, the first volume of The Way of the Househusband had sold 95,637 copies by September 2018, while the second volume had sold 143,051 copies by January 2019. The first volume of the English-language translation of the series placed sixteenth in Nielsen BookScan's best-selling graphic novels for adults in September 2019.

=== Awards ===
Year	Category	Institution or publication	Result	Notes	Ref.
2018	Best Overall Series	Pixiv Comic Ranking	Won		
2018	Best Comedy Series	Pixiv Comic Ranking	Won		
2018	Best Web Manga Series	Next Manga Awards	Runner-up		
2018	Annual Ranking	Web Manga General Election	Ninth Place		
2018	Annual Ranking	Nationwide Bookstore Employees' Recommended Comics of 2018	Second Place		
2019	Best Series for Male Readers	Kono Manga ga Sugoi!	Eighth Place		
2020	Best Humor Publication	Eisner Awards	Won	English-language translation by Viz Media	
