= Sandaime J Soul Brothers discography =

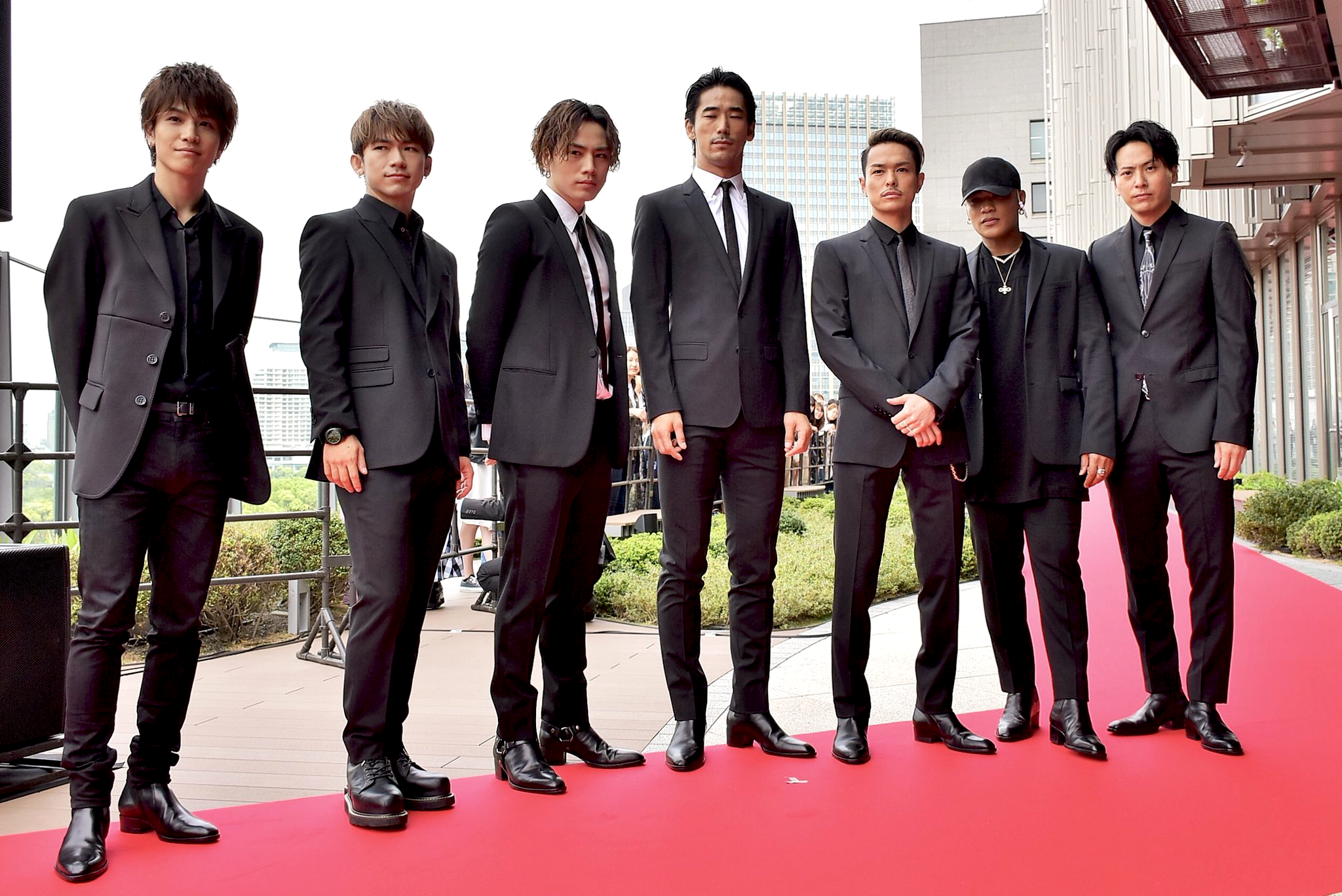
- The members of Sandaime J Soul Brothers at the SSFF Asia festival, 2018
- Studio albums: 10
- EPs: 1
- Compilation albums: 3
- Singles: 26
- Video albums: 5 (Note: This includes the music videos and concert DVDs.)
- Music videos: 40 (Note: This does not include the alternate versions of some music videos.)

The discography of the Japanese pop group Sandaime J Soul Brothers consists of ten studio albums, three compilation albums, one extended play, and twenty-six singles. Since the group's original formation in 1999, the group has experienced two line-up changes and reboots, and currently consists of seven members: Naoto Kataoka, Naoki Kobayashi, Ryuji Imaichi, Hiroomi Tosaka, Elly, Takanori Iwata, Kenjiro Yamashita. The group was formed by producer and former Exile member Hiroyuki Igarashi who founded the group's management agency LDH Japan.

Sandaime J Soul Brothers released their first single "Best Friend's Girl" in November 2010, which was certified gold by the Recording Industry Association of Japan and peaked at number three on the Oricon Weekly Chart. Their first studio album J Soul Brothers was released a year after, also peaking at number three on the Oricon Weekly Chart. The group first saw major success in 2012 with the release of their promotional single "Hanabi", which became a major hit that year, being certified Triple Platinum and reaching number two on the Billboard Japan Hot 100. The song went on to win an Excellence Work award and received a nomination for the Grand Prix at the Japan Record Awards. The following year, the group's third studio album Miracle became their first number-one album on the Oricon Albums Chart.

In 2014, their single "R.Y.U.S.E.I" hit number one on both the Oricon and Billboard Japan charts, becoming the group's biggest commercial single at the time and earning Sandaime J Soul Brothers their first grand prix award at the Japan Record Awards. "R.Y.U.S.E.I." would eventually be certified Gold, Million and Silver by the Recording Industry Association of Japan on physical, digital and streaming certifications, respectively. The song ranked at number nineteen on the yearly Billboard Japan Hot 100 chart and rose to number one yet again in 2015. The group's eighteenth single "Summer Madness" also peaked at number seven on the same Billboard yearly charts on that year.

The group released their best selling album Planet Seven, which was also the second best selling album of the year in Japan, in 2015. The album also received a Million certification. The group followed up in 2016 with the release of their sixth studio album The JSB Legacy, which had the group's highest daily sales for any of their albums and eventually sold 648,415 physical copies as well as being certified Triple Platinum.

Sandaime J Soul Brothers have achieved six number-one albums and eight number-one singles throughout their career, selling a total of more than 11.15 million records since their debut in 2010. The group has consistently been ranked among the highest earning groups in Japan since 2015, peaking twice as the highest earning group in mid 2016 and 2018 as reported by Oricon.

== Discography ==
=== Studio albums ===
List of albums, with selected chart positions
| Title | Album details | Peak positions | | Sales | Certifications |
| Title | Album details | JPN | TWN East Asia | Sales | Certifications |
|---|---|---|---|---|---|
| J Soul Brothers | Released: June 1, 2011 (JPN); Label: Rhythm Zone; Formats: CD, CD/DVD, digital download | 3 | — | JPN: 137,366 | RIAJ: Gold |
| Tribal Soul | Released: December 7, 2011 (JPN); Label: Rhythm Zone; Formats: CD, CD/DVD, CD/3DVD, digital download | 2 | — | JPN: 156,894 | RIAJ: Gold |
| Miracle | Released: January 1, 2013 (JPN); Label: Rhythm Zone; Formats: CD, CD/DVD, CD/2DVD, digital download | 1 | 9 | JPN: 264,345 | RIAJ: Platinum |
| Blue Impact (Note: Sandaime J Soul Brothers' fourth studio album Blue Impact was packaged together with their first compilation album The Best as a 2CD set.) | Released: January 1, 2014 (JPN); Label: Rhythm Zone; Formats: 2CD, 2CD/2DVD, 2CD/2Blu-ray, digital download | 1 | — | JPN: 391,217 | RIAJ: Platinum |
| Planet Seven | Released: January 28, 2015 (JPN); Label: Rhythm Zone; Formats: CD, CD/DVD, CD/Blu-ray, digital download | 1 | — | JPN: 912,903 | RIAJ: Million |
| The JSB Legacy | Release: March 30, 2016 (JPN); Label: Rhythm Zone; Formats: CD, CD/DVD, CD/Blu-ray, digital download | 1 | — | JPN: 648,415 | RIAJ: 3× Platinum |
| Future | Released: June 6, 2018 (JPN); Label: Rhythm Zone; Formats: CD, CD/DVD, CD/Blu-ray, digital download | 1 | — | JPN: 227,705 | RIAJ: Platinum |
| Raise the Flag | Released: March 18, 2020 (JPN); Label: Rhythm Zone; Formats: CD, CD/DVD, CD/Blu-ray, digital download | 2 | — | JPN: 136,045 | |
| Land of Promise | Released: March 27, 2024 (JPN); Label: Rhythm Zone; Formats: CD, CD/Blu-ray, digital download | 1 | — | JPN: 67,933 | |
| Echoes of Duality | Released: November 13, 2024 (JPN); Label: Rhythm Zone; Formats: CD, CD/Blu-ray, digital download | 3 | — | JPN: 39,199 | |
Figure numbers displayed here are compiled from data by Oricon drawn from approximately 39,700 retail outlets and do only represent physical sales. Certifications by the Recording Industry Association of Japan reflect the gross number of physical albums shipped to record stores. In late 2018, Oricon announced a reworking of their charts by introducing a new main chart that combines digital sales, physical sales and online streams. The new scoring system is based on total combined points from different formats.

=== Compilation albums ===
List of albums, with selected chart positions
| Title | Album details | Peak positions | Certifications |
| Title | Album details | JPN | Certifications |
|---|---|---|---|
| The Best | Released: January 1, 2014 (JPN); Label: Rhythm Zone; Formats: 2CD, 2CD/2DVD, 2CD/2Blu-ray, digital download | 1 | RIAJ: Platinum |
| The JSB World | Released: March 29, 2017 (JPN); Label: Rhythm Zone; Formats: 3CD, 3CD/2DVD, digital download | 1 | RIAJ: 2× Platinum |
| 24/7: JSB Forever | Released: October 21, 2026 (JPN); Label: Rhythm Zone; Formats: 2×CD/DVD, 2×CD/Blu-ray, digital download | 6 | |

=== Extended plays ===
List of EPs, with selected chart positions
| Title | EP details | Peak positions | Sales |
| Title | EP details | JPN | Sales |
|---|---|---|---|
| One | Released: March 18, 2026; Label: Rhythm Zone; Formats: CD, CD/DVD, CD/Blu-ray, digital download | 4 | JPN: 34,244 |

=== Singles ===
==== As lead artists ====
List of singles, with selected chart positions
| Title | Year | Peak chart positions | | Certifications | Album |
| Title | Year | JPN | JPN Hot (Note: Sources for chart positions are as follows: "Best Friend's Girl", "On Your Mark (Hikari no Kiseki)", "Love Song", "Japanese Soul Brothers", "Fighters", "Refrain", "Go My Way", "Hanabi", "Powder Snow (Eien ni Owaranai Fuyu)", "Spark", "Burning Up", "So Right", "Fuyu Monogatari", "S.A.K.U.R.A.", "R.Y.U.S.E.I.", "Wedding Bell", "Summer Dreams Come True", "C.O.S.M.O.S.", "Glory", "Orion", "Eeny, Neeny, Miny, Moe!", "Link", "All Love". "Starting Over", "Storm Riders", "J.S.B. Dream" "Summer Madness", "Unfair World", "Scarlet", "Movin' On", "Hand in Hand", "Baby Don't Cry", "What Is Your Secret?".) | Certifications | Album |
|---|---|---|---|---|---|
| "Best Friend's Girl" | 2010 | 3 | 3 | RIAJ (digital): Platinum; RIAJ (physical): Gold | J Soul Brothers |
| "On Your Mark (Hikari no Kiseki)" (ヒカリのキセキ; "Miracle of Light") | 2010 | 3 | 5 | RIAJ (cellphone): Gold | J Soul Brothers |
| "Love Song" | 2011 | 7 | 8 | RIAJ (digital): Platinum | J Soul Brothers |
| "Fighters" | 2011 | 1 | 7 | RIAJ (digital): Gold; RIAJ (physical): Gold | Tribal Soul |
| "Refrain" (リフレイン, Rifurein) | 2011 | 2 | 7 | RIAJ (digital): Gold | Tribal Soul |
| "Go My Way" | 2012 | 3 | 3 | RIAJ (digital): Gold; RIAJ (physical): Gold | Miracle |
| 0: Zero | 2012 | 3 | — (Note: As a non-eponymous single featuring four promoted A-sides ("Hanabi", "(You Shine) The World", "Kiss You Tonight" and "Let's Party"), 0: Zero did not chart on the Billboard Japan Hot 100, however peaked at number three on the Hot Single Sales sub-chart.) | RIAJ (physical): Gold | Miracle |
| "Powder Snow (Eien ni Owaranai Fuyu)" (永遠に終わらない冬; "Endless Winter") | 2012 | 3 | 3 | RIAJ (digital): Platinum; RIAJ (physical): Gold | Miracle |
| "Spark" | 2013 | 2 | 3 | RIAJ (physical): Gold | Blue Impact |
| "Fuyu Monogatari" (冬物語; "Winter Story") | 2013 | 2 | 10 | RIAJ (digital): Platinum; RIAJ (physical): Gold | Blue Impact |
| "So Right" | 2013 | 2 | 3 | RIAJ (digital): Gold | Blue Impact |
| "S.A.K.U.R.A." ("Cherry Blossoms") | 2014 | 2 | 2 | RIAJ (physical): Gold | Planet Seven |
| "R.Y.U.S.E.I." ("Meteor") | 2014 | 1 | 1 | RIAJ (digital): Million; RIAJ (physical): Gold; RIAJ (streaming): Platinum | Planet Seven |
| "C.O.S.M.O.S." (秋桜, Kosumosu) | 2014 | 3 | 2 | RIAJ (digital): Platinum; RIAJ (physical): Gold; RIAJ (streaming): Gold | Planet Seven |
| "O.R.I.O.N." | 2014 | 2 | 1 | RIAJ (digital): Platinum; RIAJ (physical): Gold | Planet Seven |
| "Starting Over" | 2015 | 1 | 1 | RIAJ (digital): Gold; RIAJ (physical): Platinum | The JSB Legacy |
| "Storm Riders" (featuring Slash) | 2015 | 3 | 2 | RIAJ (digital): Gold; RIAJ (physical): Gold | The JSB Legacy |
| "Summer Madness" (featuring Afrojack) | 2015 | 1 | 1 | RIAJ (digital): Platinum; RIAJ: (physical): Platinum | The JSB Legacy |
| "Unfair World" | 2015 | 2 | 2 | RIAJ (digital): Gold; RIAJ (physical): Platinum | The JSB Legacy |
| "Welcome to Tokyo" | 2016 | 2 | 2 | RIAJ (digital): Gold; RIAJ (physical): Platinum | The JSB World |
| "Happy" | 2017 | 1 | 1 | RIAJ (digital): Gold; RIAJ (physical): Gold | The JSB World |
| "J.S.B. Happiness" | 2017 | 1 | 1 | RIAJ (physical): Gold | Future |
| "Yes We Are" | 2019 | 2 | 2 | RIAJ (physical): Gold | Raise the Flag |
| "Scarlet" (featuring Afrojack) | 2019 | 2 | 1 | RIAJ (physical): Gold | Raise the Flag |
| "Fuyuzora / White Wings" (冬空/White Wings; "Winter Sky/White Wings") | 2019 | 2 | 4 | | Raise the Flag |
| "Movin' On" | 2020 | 1 | 4 | | Non-album singles |
| "Hand in Hand" | 2023 | — | 64 | | Non-album singles |
| "Baby Don't Cry" | 2024 | — | 91 | | Echoes of Duality |
| "What Is Your Secret?" | 2025 | — | 88 | | Non-album single |
"—" denotes items that did not chart.

==== As featured artists ====
List of singles, with selected chart positions
| Title | Year | Peak chart positions | | Certifications | Album |
| Title | Year | JPN | JPN Hot | Certifications | Album |
|---|---|---|---|---|---|
| "Burning Up" (among Exile Tribe) (Note: Instead of featuring all members of Exile Tribe, "Burning Up" was a collaboration between Sandaime J Soul Brothers and Generations from Exile Tribe.) | 2013 | 1 | 3 | RIAJ (physical): Gold | Exile Tribe Revolution |

==== Promotional singles ====
List of promotional singles with selected chart positions
| Title | Year | Peak chart positions | Certifications | Album |
| Title | Year | JPN Hot | Certifications | Album |
|---|---|---|---|---|
| "Japanese Soul Brothers" (Nidaime J Soul Brothers + Sandaime J Soul Brothers) | 2011 | 29 | | J Soul Brothers |
| "Hanabi" (花火; "Fireworks") | 2012 | 2 | RIAJ (digital): 3× Platinum | 0: Zero / Miracle |
| "(You Shine) The World" | 2012 | — | | 0: Zero / Miracle |
| "Kiss You Tonight" | 2012 | — | | 0: Zero / Miracle |
| "Let's Party" | 2012 | — | | 0: Zero / Miracle |
| "Summer Dreams Come True" | 2014 | 70 | | "R.Y.U.S.E.I." (single) / Planet Seven |
| "Wedding Bell (Subarashiki Kana Jinsei)" (素晴らしきかな人生; "Maybe Wonderful Life") | 2014 | 42 | RIAJ (digital): Gold | "R.Y.U.S.E.I." (single) / Planet Seven |
| "Glory" | 2014 | 57 | | "C.O.S.M.O.S." (single) / Planet Seven |
| "Eeny, Neeny, Miny, Moe!" | 2015 | 8 | RIAJ (digital): Gold | Planet Seven |
| "Link" | 2015 | 92 | | Planet Seven |
| "All Love" | 2015 | 93 | | Planet Seven |
| "J.S.B. Dream" | 2015 | 59 | | "Storm Riders" (single) |
| "Feel So Alive" | 2016 | 5 | RIAJ (digital): Gold | The JSB Legacy |
| "Mugen Road" | 2016 | 6 | RIAJ (digital): Gold | High & Low Original Best Album |
| "Koi to Ai" (恋と愛; "Affection and Love") | 2018 | 9 | | Future |
| "Rainbow" | 2018 | 15 | | Future |

== Videography ==
=== Video albums ===
List of media, with selected chart positions
| Title | Album details | Peak positions | | Certifications |
| Title | Album details | JPN DVD | JPN Blu-ray | Certifications |
|---|---|---|---|---|
| Live Tour 2012 0: Zero | Released: March 13, 2013 (JPN); Label: Rhythm Zone; Formats: DVD, Blu-ray | 2 | 3 | |
| Live Tour 2014: Blue Impact | Released: June 25, 2014 (JPN); Label: Rhythm Zone; Formats: DVD, Blu-ray | 1 | 1 | RIAJ: Gold |
| Live Tour 2015: Blue Planet | Released: December 16, 2015 (JPN); Label: Rhythm Zone; Formats: DVD, Blu-ray | 1 | 2 | RIAJ: 2× Platinum |
| Live Tour 2016-17: Metropoliz | Released: December 13, 2017 (JPN); Label: Rhythm Zone; Formats: DVD, Blu-ray | 1 | 1 | RIAJ: Platinum |
| Live Tour 2017: Unknown Metropoliz | Released: March 21, 2018 (JPN); Label: Rhythm Zone; Formats: DVD, Blu-ray | 1 | 2 | RIAJ: Gold |

=== Music videos ===
| Year | Title | Artist(s) | Album |
|---|---|---|---|
| 2010 | "Best Friend's Girl" | Sandaime J Soul Brothers | J Soul Brothers |
| 2010 | "On Your Mark ～ヒカリのキセキ～" | Sandaime J Soul Brothers | J Soul Brothers |
| 2011 | "24karats Stay Gold" | Exile (feat. Sandaime J Soul Brothers) | J Soul Brothers |
| 2011 | "Love Song" | Sandaime J Soul Brothers | J Soul Brothers |
| 2011 | "Japanese Soul Brothers" | Nidaime J Soul Brothers + Sandaime J Soul Brothers | J Soul Brothers |
| 2011 | "Fighters" | Sandaime J Soul Brothers | Tribal Soul |
| 2011 | "Refrain" | Sandaime J Soul Brothers | Tribal Soul |
| 2012 | "Go My Way" | Sandaime J Soul Brothers | Miracle |
| 2012 | "Hanabi" (花火) | Sandaime J Soul Brothers | Miracle |
| 2012 | "24karats Tribe of Gold" | Exile Tribe | The Best |
| 2012 | "Powder Snow ～永遠に終わらない冬～" | Sandaime J Soul Brothers | Miracle |
| 2013 | "Looks @ Us Now!" | Sandaime J Soul Brothers | Miracle |
| 2013 | "Spark" | Sandaime J Soul Brothers from Exile Tribe | Blue Impact |
| 2013 | "Burning Up" | Sandaime J Soul Brothers vs. Generations | Blue Impact |
| 2013 | "Fuyu Monogatari" (冬物語) | Sandaime J Soul Brothers from Exile Tribe | Blue Impact |
| 2013 | "So Right" | Sandaime J Soul Brothers from Exile Tribe | Blue Impact |
| 2014 | "S.A.K.U.R.A." | Sandaime J Soul Brothers from Exile Tribe | Planet Seven |
| 2014 | "R.Y.U.S.E.I." | Sandaime J Soul Brothers from Exile Tribe | Planet Seven |
| 2014 | "The Revolution" | Exile Tribe | Exile Tribe Revolution |
| 2014 | "24World" | Exile Tribe | Exile Tribe Revolution |
| 2014 | "C.O.S.M.O.S. ～秋桜～" | Sandaime J Soul Brothers from Exile Tribe | Planet Seven |
| 2014 | "O.R.I.O.N." | Sandaime J Soul Brothers from Exile Tribe | Planet Seven |
| 2015 | "Storm Riders" | Sandaime J Soul Brothers from Exile Tribe (feat. Slash) | Storm Riders Single Album |
| 2015 | "J.S.B. Dream" | Sandaime J Soul Brothers from Exile Tribe | Storm Riders Single Album |
| 2015 | "Summer Madness" | Sandaime J Soul Brothers from Exile Tribe (feat. Afrojack) | Summer Madness Single Album |
| 2015 | "Unfair World" | Sandaime J Soul Brothers from Exile Tribe | Unfair World Single Album |
| 2016 | "Feel So Alive" | Sandaime J Soul Brothers from Exile Tribe | Single Album |
| 2016 | "Welcome to Tokyo" | Sandaime J Soul Brothers from Exile Tribe | Welcome to Tokyo Single Album |
| 2017 | "Happy" | Sandaime J Soul Brothers from Exile Tribe | HAPPY Single Album |
| 2017 | "J.S.B. Happiness" | Sandaime J Soul Brothers from Exile Tribe | J.S.B Happiness Single Album |
| 2017 | "J.S.B. Love" | Sandaime J Soul Brothers from Exile Tribe | |
| 2018 | "Koi to Ai" (恋と愛) | Sandaime J Soul Brothers from Exile Tribe | Future |
| 2018 | "Rainbow" | Sandaime J Soul Brothers from Exile Tribe (feat. Yellow Claw) | Future |
| 2019 | "Yes We Are" | Sandaime J Soul Brothers from Exile Tribe | |
| 2019 | "Raise the Flag" | Sandaime J Soul Brothers from Exile Tribe | |
| 2019 | "Scarlet" | Sandaime J Soul Brothers from Exile Tribe (feat. Afrojack) | |
| 2019 | "White Wings" | Sandaime J Soul Brothers from Exile Tribe | |
| 2019 | "Fuyuzora" (冬空) | Sandaime J Soul Brothers from Exile Tribe | |
