= Taiko no Tatsujin: Drum 'n' Fun! =

2018 video game

- Japanese box art
- Developers: Bandai Namco Studios; DokiDoki Groove Works
- Publisher: Bandai Namco Entertainment
- Series: Taiko no Tatsujin
- Platform: Nintendo Switch
- Release: JP: July 19, 2018; SEA: August 9, 2018; WW: November 2, 2018
- Genre: Rhythm
- Modes: Single-player, multiplayer

Taiko no Tatsujin: Drum 'n' Fun!, released in Asia as Taiko no Tatsujin: Nintendo Switch Version!, (Note: Japanese: 太鼓の達人 Nintendo Switchば~じょん!, Hepburn: Taiko no Tatsujin: Nintendo Switch Bājon!) is a rhythm game developed by Bandai Namco Studios & DokiDoki Groove Works and published by Bandai Namco Entertainment. It was first released in Japan and other parts of Asia in July 2018, and in North America, Europe and Australia in November. The title's release marks the first release of a Taiko no Tatsujin game to Western audiences in over a decade. It was delisted from the Nintendo eShop in November 2023.

== Gameplay ==
Similar to past entries in the series, music notes, represented by circular faces of the series' mascots, move across a timeline in the middle of the screen from right to left. Red notes (ドン, don) represent the face of the drum, while blue notes (カッ, ka) represent the drum's rim. Successfully playing the correct note as each one reaches the end of the timeline builds up a "Soul Gauge". If the gauge reaches a certain point by the end of the song, the stage is cleared.

There are several control options for Drum n' Fun!. The most accurate and consistent option is a specific peripheral controller developed by Hori, in the shape of a drum, as well as non-electronic plastic "drumsticks". These drums are sold separately or in a bundle with the game. It's possible, however, to use a regular controller to play, through use of a buttons-only mode. One could also use the Nintendo Switch's native controllers, the Joy-Con, through a mechanic called "virtual drumsticks" that utilizes the advanced motion controls of the Joy-Con. This method is considered unreliable and best for casual gameplay.

Besides traditional gameplay for a maximum of two players, a multitude of multiplayer rhythm-based party games are present to further expand upon the concept for up to 4 players. Additional updates to the game further added a head-to-head competitive multiplayer mode for two players, as well as online head-to-head and tournament competitive multiplayer modes.

== Tracklist ==
Similar to previous games in the series, the tracklist is organized into seven categories. The game also features downloadable song packs which can be purchased through the Nintendo eShop. The game contains 300 songs (inclusive of all downloadable songs) as of July 2020.

List of songs

Pop

Song	Artist	Year	DLC
"Takaneno Hanakosan" (高嶺の花子さん)	Back Number	2013	No
"TT -Japanese ver.-"	Twice	2016	No
"Mita Koto mo Nai Keshiki" (見たこともない景色)	Masaki Suda	2017	No
"Tomoni" (ともに)	Wanima	2016	No
"Zenzenzense" (前前前世)	Radwimps	2016	No
"R.Y.U.S.E.I."	Sandaime J Soul Brothers	2014	No
"Sugar Song & Bitter Step" (シュガーソングとビターステップ)	Unison Square Garden	2015	No
"RPG"	Sekai no Owari	2013	No
"Memeshikute" (女々しくて)	Golden Bomber	2009	No
"Silent Jealousy"	X Japan	1991	No
"One Night Carnival"	Kishidan	2001	No
"Train-Train"	The Blue Hearts	1988	No
"Natsumatsuri" (夏祭り)	Whiteberry	2000	No
"Sayonara Elegy" (さよならエレジー) (Note: Available through purchase of Pops Pack Volume 1.)	Masaki Suda	2018	Yes
"U.S.A."	Da Pump	2018	Yes
"Koi" (恋)	Gen Hoshino	2016	Yes
"Zassou" (雑草) (Note: The song was available for free download from December 6, 2018 (Japan and Asia) / December 20, 2018 (North America) / January 17, 2019 (UK, Europe and Australia) to January 31, 2019. Become paid DLC from February 1, 2019 onwards.)	Hikakin & Seikin	2017	Yes
"Garasu wo Ware" (ガラスを割れ！) (Note: Available through purchase of Pops Pack Volume 2.)	Keyakizaka46	2018	Yes
"Synchronicity" (シンクロニシティ)	Nogizaka46	2018	Yes
"Koisuru Fortune Cookie" (恋するフォーチュンクッキー)	AKB48	2013	Yes
"Mezase Pokémon Master -20th Anniversary-" (めざせポケモンマスター -20th Anniversary-) (Note: The song was available as Pokémon Let's Go! Pikachu/Let's Go! Eevee" & Pokémon Anime Music Pack on February 7, 2019 at Japan and other parts of Asia. Meanwhile in North America, UK, Europe and Australia it was available as an individual DLC from February 14.)	Rika Matsumoto	2017	Yes
"Mirai Connection" (未来コネクション)	ЯeaL	2018	Yes
"Marigold" (マリーゴールド) (Note: Available as an individual DLC.)	Aimyon	2018	Yes
"Ainokatachi feat.HIDE (GReeeeN)" (アイノカタチ feat.HIDE(GReeeeN))	Misia feat. Hide from Greeeen	2018	Yes
"Anata to Tourattatta♪" (あなたとトゥラッタッタ♪)	Dreams Come True	2018	Yes
"Uma to Shika" (馬と鹿)	Kenshi Yonezu	2019	Yes
"Kimi wa Rock wo Kikanai" (君はロックを聴かない)	Aimyon	2017	Yes
"Christmas Song" (クリスマスソング)	Back Number	2015	Yes
"Dramaturgy" (ドラマツルギー)	Eve	2017	Yes
"Himawari no Yakusoku" (ひまわりの約束) (Note: Available through purchase of Pops Pack Volume 3.)	Motohiro Hata	2014	Yes
"Silent Majority" (サイレントマジョリティー)	Keyakizaka46	2016	Yes
"Gimme Chocolate!!" (ギミチョコ！！)	Babymetal	2015	Yes
"Hakujitsu" (白日) (Note: Available through purchase of Pops Pack Volume 4.)	King Gnu	2019	Yes
"366 Nichi" (366日)	HY	2008	Yes
"Mikazuki" (三日月)	Ayaka	2006	Yes
"Ambivalent" (アンビバレント) (Note: Available through purchase of Pops Pack Volume 5.)	Keyakizaka46	2018	Yes
"Sekai wa Anata ni Warai Kaketeiru" (世界はあなたに笑いかけている)	Little Glee Monster	2018	Yes
"Winding Road"	Man with a Mission	2018	Yes
"GODSONG" (ゴッドソング) (Note: The song was available for free download from July 9, 2020 as a collaboration event with the band Band Ja Naimon! MAXX NAKAYOSHI.)	Band Ja Naimon! MAXX NAKAYOSHI	2020	Yes
"Literary Nonsense" (ナンセンス文学) (Note: Available through purchase of Rock Music Pack.)	Eve	2017	Yes
"Rocket Dive"	Hide with Spread Beaver	1998	Yes
"Yes we are" (Note: Available through purchase of Dance Music Pack.)	Sandaime J Soul Brothers	2019	Yes
"EZ Do Dance"	TRF	1993	Yes
"Kibun Joujou" (気分上々↑↑)	Mihimaru GT	2006	Yes
"Tada Kimi ni Hare" (ただ君に晴れ)	Yorushika	2018	Yes

Anime

Song	Artist	Origin	Year	DLC
"Howling"	Flow×Granrodeo	The Seven Deadly Sins: Revival of The Commandments	2018	No
"Pop Team Epic"	Sumire Uesaka	Pop Team Epic	2018	No
"Lupinranger VS Patranger" (ルパンレンジャーVSパトレンジャー)	Project.R	Kaitou Sentai Lupinranger VS Keisatsu Sentai Patranger	2018	No
"Be The One"	Pandora feat. Beverly	Kamen Rider Build	2017	No
"How Far I’ll Go" (どこまでも～How Far I’ll Go～)	Tomona Yabiku	Moana	2016	No
"Alola!!" (アローラ!!)	Satoshi with Pikachu (Rika Matsumoto & Ikue Otani)	Pokémon the Series: Sun & Moon	2016	No
"Yo-kai Exercise No. 1" (ようかい体操第一)	Dream5	Yo-kai Watch	2014	No
"Odore Dore Dora Doraemon Ondo" (踊れ・どれ・ドラ ドラえもん音頭)	Wasabi Mizuta, Morinoki Jidou Gasshoudan	Doraemon (2005)	2005	No
"Itsumo Nandodemo" (いつも何度でも)	Youmi Kimura	Spirited Away	2001	No
"Kimi ni 100 Percent" (キミに100パーセント)	Kyary Pamyu Pamyu	Crayon Shin-chan	2013	No
"We Are!" (ウィーアー!)	Hiroshi Kitadani	One Piece	1999	No
"A Cruel Angel's Thesis" (残酷な天使のテーゼ)	Yoko Takahashi	Neon Genesis Evangelion	1995	No
"Cha-La Head-Cha-La"	Hironobu Kageyama	Dragon Ball Z	1989	No
"Odoru Pompokolin" (おどるポンポコリン)	B.B.Queens	Chibi Maruko-chan	1990	No
"SANPO" (さんぽ)	Azumi Inoue	My Neighbor Totoro	1988	No
"Anpanman’s March" (アンパンマンのマーチ)	Dreaming	Anpanman	1988	No
"Shinka Riron" (進化理論) (Note: Available only in Japan. It was available for free download from July 19-August 31, 2018. Become paid DLC from September 1, 2018 onwards.)	Boys and Men	Shinkansen Henkei Robo Shinkalion	2018	Yes
"Carrying You" (君をのせて) (Note: Available through purchase of Studio Ghibli Pack.)	Azumi Inoue	Castle in the Sky	1986	Yes
"My Neighbor Totoro - Ending Theme Song" (となりのトトロ)	Azumi Inoue	My Neighbor Totoro	1988	Yes
"Rougeno Dengon" (ルージュの伝言)	Yumi Matsutoya	Kiki's Delivery Service	1989	Yes
"A Town with an Ocean View" (海の見える街)	Joe Hisaishi	Kiki's Delivery Service	1989	Yes
"Ponyo on the Cliff by the Sea" (崖の上のポニョ)	Fujioka Fujimaki, Nozomi Ōhashi	Ponyo	2008	Yes
"Try Everything" (トライ・エヴリシング) (Note: Available through purchase of Winter Holiday Anime Pack.)	Dream Ami	Zootopia	2016	Yes
"Let It Go" (Let It Go ～ありのままで～)	Takako Matsu	Frozen	2013	Yes
"Do You Want to Build a Snowman?" (雪だるまつくろう)	Sayaka Kanda	Frozen	2013	Yes
"CHOUZETSU☆DYNAMIC!" (超絶☆ダイナミック！) (Note: Available through purchase of Dragon Ball Anime Song Pack.)	Kazuya Yoshii	Dragon Ball Super	2015	Yes
"Dragon Soul"	Takayoshi Tanimoto (Dragon Soul)	Dragon Ball Kai	2009	Yes
"MAKAHUSHIGI ADVENTURE!" (魔訶不思議アドベンチャー！)	Hiroki Takahashi	Dragon Ball	1986	Yes
"The Path of the Wind" (風のとおり道) (Note: Available through purchase of Studio Ghibli Pack Volume 2.)	Joe Hisaishi	My Neighbor Totoro	1988	Yes
"Merry-o-Round of Life" (人生のメリーゴーランド)	Joe Hisaishi	Howl's Moving Castle	2004	Yes
"YASASHISANI TSUTSUMARETANARA" (やさしさにつつまれたなら)	Yumi Matsutoya	Kiki's Delivery Service	1989	Yes
"Kishiryu Sentai Ryusoulger" (騎士竜戦隊リュウソウジャー)	Tomohiro Hatano	Kishiryu Sentai Ryusoulger	2019	Yes
"Butter-Fly"	Koji Wada	Digimon Adventure	1999	Yes
"Blue Sapphire" (Note: Available through purchase of Case Closed Pack.)	Hiroomi Tosaka	Case Closed: The Fist of Blue Sapphire	2019	Yes
"Countdown" (カウントダウン)	NormCore	Case Closed	2018	Yes
"Detective Conan Main Theme" (名探偵コナン メイン・テーマ)	Katsuo Ōno	Detective Conan	1996	Yes
"OVER THE TOP" (Note: Available through purchase of One Piece Anime Song Pack.)	Hiroshi Kitadani	One Piece	2019	Yes
"We Go!" (ウィーゴー！)	Hiroshi Kitadani	One Piece	2011	Yes
"We Can!" (ウィーキャン！)	Kishidan and Hiroshi Kitadani	One Piece	2016	Yes
"Ai ni Dekiru koto wa Mada Arukai" (愛にできることはまだあるかい) (Note: Available through purchase of Weathering with You Anime Song Pack.)	Radwimps	Weathering with You	2019	Yes
"Grand Escape" (グランドエスケープ)	Radwimps feat. Tōko Miura	Weathering with You	2019	Yes
"Kazetachi no Koe" (風たちの声)	Radwimps	Weathering with You	2019	Yes
"Inferno" (インフェルノ) (Note: Available through purchase of Late Night Anime Pack Vol.1.)	Mrs. Green Apple	Fire Force	2019	Yes
"Mission! Ken-kou-dai-ichi" (ミッション！健・康・第・イチ)	Red Blood Cell, White Blood Cell, Killer T. Cell, Monocyte (Kana Hanazawa, Tomoaki Maeno, Daisuke Ono, Kikuko Inoue)	Cells at Work!	2018	Yes
"crossing field"	LiSA	Sword Art Online	2012	Yes
"Connect" (コネクト)	ClariS	Puella Magi Madoka Magica	2011	Yes
"Kimi no Shiranai Monogatari" (君の知らない物語)	Supercell	Bakemonogatari	2009	Yes
"Gurenge" (紅蓮華)	LiSA	Demon Slayer: Kimetsu no Yaiba	2019	Yes

Vocaloid

Song	Artist	Year	DLC
"Haikei Doppelganger" (拝啓ドッペルゲンガー)	kemu feat. GUMI	2017	No
"Jumenso - Colorful Version" (十面相; colorful ver.)	YM feat. GUMI	2011	No
"Onigiri wa Dokokashira♪" (おにぎりはどこかしら♪)	Yomi feat. Hatsune Miku	2016	No
"Senbonzakura" (千本桜) (Note: Available through purchase of Vocaloid Music Pack.) (Note: The song is not included in South Korea.)	Kurousa-P (WhiteFlame) feat. Hatsune Miku	2011	Yes
"Charles" (シャルル)	Balloon feat. flower	2016	Yes
"Asu no Yozora Shoukaihan" (アスノヨゾラ哨戒班)	Orangestar feat. IA	2014	Yes
"Hatsune Miku no Shoushitsu -Gekijouban-" (初音ミクの消失‐劇場版‐)	cosMo feat. Hatsune Miku	2011	Yes
"Tooriyo" (トオリヨ)	Tezuka feat. Kagamine Rin/Kagamine Len	2015	Yes
"Dance Robot Dance" (ダンスロボットダンス) (Note: Available through purchase of Vocaloid Music Pack Volume 2.)	Nayutan Seijin feat. Hatsune Miku	2016	Yes
"A Tale of Six Trillion Years and a Night" (六兆年と一夜物語)	kemu feat. IA	2012	Yes
"Happy Synthesizer" (ハッピーシンセサイザ)	EasyPop feat. Megurine Luka and GUMI	2010	Yes
"Woof Meow World" (わんにゃーワールド)	feat. Kagamine Rin/Kagamine Len starring Asami Shimoda	2011	Yes
"Mirai" (ミライ)	Mirai Komachi	2018	Yes
"Roki" (ロキ) (Note: Available through purchase of Vocaloid Music Pack Volume 3.)	Mikito-P feat. Kagamine Rin	2018	Yes
"Ame to Petra" (雨とペトラ)	Balloon feat. flower	2017	Yes
"Cantabile×Passione" (カンタービレ×パッシオーネ)	OSTER project feat. Hatsune Miku	2017	Yes
"Heavymetal Fugitive" (重金属フューギティブ)	Ryuitti feat. GUMI	2013	Yes
"future beat"	Mifumei feat. Mirai Komachi	2019	Yes

Variety

Song	Artist	Year	DLC
"YouTube Theme Song" (YouTubeテーマソング)	HIKAKIN & SEIKIN	2015	No
"JONETSU - TAIRIKU" (情熱大陸)	Taro Hakase	1999	No
"The Alphabet Song" (ABCの歌)	Nursery rhyme	1835	No
"Grip & Break down!! -Tatsujin Edit.-" (Grip & Break down!! -達人Edit.-)	Toho Project Arrange (SOUND HOLIC feat. Nana Takahashi)	2008	No
"Iro wa Niho e do Chiri nuru o" (色は匂へど散りぬるを)	Toho Project Arrange (Yu-Hei Satellite)	2010	No
"Bad Apple!! feat. nomico"	Toho Project Arrange (Alstroemeria Records)	2007	No
"Omae Butamen!" (おまえブタメン!)	Oyatsu Company & The Puh	2018	No
"Night of Knights / Knight of Nights" (ナイト・オブ・ナイツ) (Note: Available through purchase of Toho Project Arrange Pack.)	Toho Project Arrange (beatMARIO (COOL&CREATE))	2007	Yes
"Tsuki ni Murakumo Hana ni Kaze" (月に叢雲華に風)	Toho Project Arrange (Yu-Hei Satellite)	2011	Yes
"Kero⑨destiny" (ケロ⑨destiny)	Toho Project Arrange (Silver Forest)	2007	Yes
"Jingle Bells No.765" (ジングルベル第765番) (Note: Available through purchase of Tatsujin Challenge Pack Volume 1.)		2006	Yes
"Hypnosis Mic -Division Battle Anthem-" (ヒプノシスマイク -Division Battle Anthem-)	Division All Stars	2019	Yes

Classical

Song	Composer	Year	DLC
"Kurapopuporusuka" (クラポルポルスカ)	Original adaptation of Clarinet Polka	2018	No
"Flight of the Bumblebee" (熊蜂の飛行)	Nikolai Rimsky-Korsakov	1900	No
"Turkish March" (トルコ行進曲)	Ludwig van Beethoven	1809	No
"A Little Serenade" (アイネクライネナハトムジーク)	Wolfgang Amadeus Mozart	1787	No
"Overture from Orpheus in the Underworld" (天国と地獄 序曲)	Jacques Offenbach	1858	No
"Toy Symphony" (おもちゃのシンフォニー) (Note: Available in Japan as pre-order bonus from various retailers until November 1, 2018. It added to all regions as an individual paid DLC from November 2 onwards.)	Joseph Haydn	1770	Yes
"Symphony No.25 in G Minor - First Movement" (交響曲第25番ト短調第一楽章)	Wolfgang Amadeus Mozart	1773	Yes
"From Symphony No.7" (交響曲第7番から)	Ludwig van Beethoven	1812	Yes
"La Campanella" (ラ・カンパネラ)	Franz Liszt	1851	Yes
"Hungarian Dance No.5" (ハンガリー舞曲第5番)	Johannes Brahms	1869	Yes
"Requiem - Days of Wrath" (レクイエム 怒りの日より)	Giuseppe Verdi	1874	Yes
"March from The Nutcracker" (行進曲「くるみ割り人形」から)	Pyotr Ilyich Tchaikovsky	1892	Yes
"Jupiter" (木星)	Gustav Holst	1914	Yes
"Montagues and Capulets" (モンタギュー家とキャピュレット家)	Sergei Prokofiev	1935	Yes
"Kare Kano Canon" (カレ・カノ・カノン)	Original adaptation of Pachelbel's Canon	2008	Yes
"Mao-u" (まおぅ) (Note: Available through purchase of Tatsujin Challenge Pack Volume 2.)	Yuu (pLumsonic!)	2015	Yes
"Alborada del gracioso" (道化師の朝の歌) (Note: Available through purchase of Tatsujin Challenge Pack Volume 3.)	Maurice Ravel & Yukiko 'YMY' Yamamoto		Yes
"The Entertainer" (エンターテイナー) (Note: Available through purchase of Tatsujin Challenge Pack Volume 4.)	Scott Joplin	1902	Yes
"O sole mio" (オーソレ・ミオ) (Note: Available through purchase of Tatsujin Challenge Pack Volume 5.)	Eduardo di Capua	1898	Yes
"Fantaisie-Impromptu" (幻想即興曲) (Note: Available through purchase of Tatsujin Challenge Pack Volume 7.)	Frédéric Chopin	1834	Yes
"Sonata, Gekkou" (其方、激昂) (Note: Available through purchase of Donder Pack -Lightning-.)	Original adaptation of Piano Sonata No. 14	2019	Yes

Game Music

Song	Artist	Origin	Year	DLC
"Jump Up, Super Star! Short Version"	Pauline (Kate Davis)	Super Mario Odyssey	2017	No
"Splatoon 2 Medley" (スプラトゥーン2 メドレー)	Toru Minegishi	Splatoon 2	2017	No
"Kirby Medley" (星のカービィメドレー)	Hirokazu Ando	Kirby's Return to Dream Land	2011	No
"PAC-MAN CHAMPIONSHIP EDITION 2" (Pac Toy-Box)	Hiroyuki Kawada	Pac-Man Championship Edition 2	2016	No
"Happy Family - Neko Tomo Theme Song" (ほんわか家族～ネコトモのうた～)	Misaki Machiya	Neko Tomo	2018	No
"Anzu no Uta" (あんずのうた)	Anzu Futaba (Hiromi Igarashi)	The Idolm@ster Cinderella Girls	2012	No
"TD - 28619029byte remix -"	Shinji Hosoe (Sampling Masters MEGA)	Techno Drive	1998	No
"Racing the Storm"	George Nishigomi	Critical Velocity	2005	No
"Assault BGM1" (アサルト BGM1)	Kazuo Noguchi	Assault	1988	No
"Ridge Racer"	Shinji Hosoe (Sampling Masters MEGA)	Ridge Racer	1993	No
"Kagekiyo" (KAGEKIYO ～源平討魔伝メドレー～)	Yuji Masubuchi	The Genji and the Heike Clans	1986	Yes
"Pokémon: Let's Go! Pikachu & Pokémon: Let's Go! Eevee" (ポケットモンスター Let's Go! ピカチュウ - Let's Go! イーブイ)	Shota Kageyama	Pokémon: Let's Go! Pikachu & Pokémon: Let's Go! Eevee!	2018	Yes
"URBAN FRAGMENTS"	Kohta Takahashi feat. Reiko Nagase	R4 -Ridge Racer Type4-	1999	Yes
"MEGALOVANIA" (Note: Available through purchase of Undertale Pack.)	Toby Fox	Undertale	2015	Yes
"Heartache (心の痛み)"	Toby Fox	Undertale	2015	Yes
"Hopes and Dreams (夢と希望)"	Toby Fox	Undertale	2015	Yes
"HimitsuKiTuber (ヒミツキチューバー)" (Note: Available through purchase of Ninja Box Pack.)	Tonkachi, Hiroto, Megahon and Pump (Emiri Katō, Megumi Han, Yuichi Nakamura and Ayumu Murase)	Ninja Box	2019	Yes
"Highschool love!" (Note: The song is available as a reward through the Online Ranking Match mode.)	Go Shiina	Tekken Tag Tournament 2	2012	No
"Boku no→Chikyu, Bokura no Chikyu (僕の→地球 僕らの地球)" (Note: Available through download of I LOVE Games Pack.)	Go Shiina	Mr. Driller Drill Land	2002	Yes
MOJIPITTAN Medley (もじぴったんメドレー)"	Satoru Kōsaki	Kotoba no Puzzle: Mojipittan	2001	Yes
"KATAMARI on the rock ~main theme (塊オンザロック～メインテーマ)"	Yuu Miyake	Katamari Damacy	2004	Yes
"No Way Back"	Go Shiina	God Eater	2010	Yes
"The arrow was shot"	Motoi Sakuraba	Tales of the Abyss	2005	Yes
"IN THE ZONE"	Go Shiina	Ace Combat: Joint Assault	2010	Yes
"Brave Sword, Braver Soul"	Yoshihito Yano	Soulcalibur II	2002	Yes
"KARMA (Tatsujin Mix)"	AJURIKA	Tekken 6	2007	Yes
"NAMCOT Medley" (ナムコットメドレー)	Masako Oogami	Various games from Namco Museum		Yes
"Fun-Filled Drum-Filled Taiko Dojo" (たのしい太鼓道場)	Jesahm	Various games by Namco	2002	Yes

Namco Original

Song	Artist	Year	DLC
"Furifuri♪Norinori♪" (フリフリ♪ノリノリ♪)	Mana	2018	No
"Wa Arudo Herite Iji - Jo" (和有るど経りて維持・序)	Yako from Danchinomiya	2018	No
"Tabetemo Tabetemo" (タベテモタベテモ)	☆shoji☆ feat. Honoka♡Erika	2018	No
"void setup"	Kaori Aihara	2018	No
"Écran Le Blanc" (エクラン ルブラン)	Miho Tsujibayashi	2018	No
"Tonde Mite" (トンデ・ミテ)	Tadahiko Yokogawa feat. Yako from Danchinomiya	2018	No
"Angel Dream" (エンジェル ドリーム)	Youko Takamizu	2007	No
"Doki-Doki Mune-Kyun Omatsuri Time" (ドキドキ胸きゅん おまつりタイム)	Namiko	2011	No
"Nijiiro Yumeiro Taikoiro" (虹色・夢色・太鼓色)	Yoko Takahashi	2002	No
"Negai wa Esperanto" (願いはエスペラント)		2017	No
"Antonio" (アントニオ)	You'll Melt More!	2016	No
"Hiyokko Fantasy" (ひよっこファンタジー)	Tsuyomy	2016	No
"The Carnivorous Carnival”	AJURIKA	2007	No
"Hyakka Ryoran" (百花繚乱)	Kakumi Nishigomi	2008	No
"Ho-oh Tenbu Mugen Kuzure" (鳳凰天舞無限崩れ)	Takahito Eguchi	2014	No
"Chikuzei ~GEAR UP~" (蓄勢 ~GEAR UP~)	Zhan Xun Wei (Chai Found Music Workshop)	2009	No
"Carnation" (和蘭撫子)		2011	No
"Boku wa Synth" (ボクハシンセ)	Nobuyoshi Sano	2013	No
"Jotei ~Imbiratula~" (女帝 ～インバラトゥーラ～)	Saori Terai	2015	No
"Souryu no Ran" (双竜ノ乱)	Xeami	2014	No
"My Mine"	setzer from MintJam	2011	Yes
"Saitama 2000" (さいたま2000)	LindaAI-CUE	2003	Yes
"Scroll Mika" (スクロール・ミカ)	Mika Satoh	2004	Yes
"Pastel Dream" (パステル ドリーム)	Youko Takamitsu	2011	Yes
"Karuizawameki" (軽いざわめき)	micazo	2006	Yes
"Inunonorimono" (イヌノノリモノ)	Kaoru Katai	2019	Yes
"Mecha DESU." (メカデス。)	Yuji Masubuchi	2003	Yes
"Diet Padaraisu" (ダイエット・パダライス)	Mika Satoh	2004	Yes
"Namahage no Uta" (ナマハゲノウタ)	DAIKI	2019	Yes
"Gold Armor"		2019	Yes
"VICTORIA"	Cranky	2016	Yes
"LOVE Ikusa!!" (LOVE戦!!)	Miyu	2010	Yes
"SORA-II Gliese 581" (SORA-II グリーゼ581)	Ryuuichi Takada	2009	Yes
"Bokura no Mae ni Michi wa Aru" (ボクらのまえに道はある)	Honoka	2019	Yes
"Shonin YokkQ" (承認欲Q)	Chiharu Kaneko feat. Haxch	2016	Yes
"Uso-uso Doki" (うそうそ時)	Bana Inoue	2013	Yes
"Itoshi no Mille-sama" (いとしのミルさま)	Yuji Masubuchi	2011	Yes
"ON SAY GO SAY"	Sho-kun	2019	Yes
"Bubbly☆Queen" (バブリィ☆クイーン) (Note: Available through purchase of Tatsujin Challenge Pack Volume 6.)	Hiromi Shibano	2010	Yes
"Chiheisen no Aeolia" (地平線のエオリア)	Natsumi of Silver Forest	2011	Yes
"Menkui Miracle" (メンクイミラクル)	Mika Satoh	2008	Yes
"Mahoushiki Tousou Kitan ☆ミ" (魔法式逃走奇譚☆ミ)	MOES feat. Erika Kaiho	2019	Yes
"Yo~i-don!" (よーいドン！)	Kiddish	2018	Yes
"OK I’m blue rat"	E.G.G.	2017	Yes
"Phoenix"	Yuriko Keino, Hirapon	2013	Yes
"Yumeiro Coaster" (夢色コースター)	Haruki Shimotsuki	2009	Yes
"Mr. Runner" (Mr.ランナー)	MOES feat. Singman	2019	Yes
"Kagayaki o motomete" (輝きを求めて)	Versus	2016	Yes
"Lightning Passion" (らいとにんぐ ぱっしょん)	Ayako Saso (Sampling Masters AYA)	2011	Yes
"Shiny Kung-fu Revival"	t+pazolite	2015	Yes
"Taiyou mo Yappappa" (太陽もヤッパッパー)	Yuri Misumi	2001	Yes
"Itadaki" (頂) (Note: Available through purchase of Donder Pack -Winter Moon-.)	CHUBAY	2019	Yes
"Blessed Bouquet Buskers"	steμ	2017	Yes
"Reitoko CJ ~Amen Taiko Brothers~" (冷凍庫CJ ～鳴呼面太鼓ブラザーズ～)	DJKurara	2016	Yes
"Toryu" (冬竜 ～Toryu～)	Azu♪	2012	Yes
"All Night de Indenai" (オールナイトdeインデナイ)	Yoshi	2011	Yes

== Release ==
Taiko Drum Master game was confirmed for Switch in Japan, revealing features such as motion control and HD rumble support for the game. The game was released on July 19, 2018. A licensed drum controller by HORI was later released.

Bandai Namco Entertainment Asia published the game in Southeast Asia, which comes with official English translation of the game, on August 9. The game arrived with Japanese voice-overs and Japanese, Chinese, and Korean text while the English text was made available via a free patch.

Bandai Namco Entertainment America published the Western release of the game alongside Taiko no Tatsujin: Drum Session! for the PlayStation 4. The Western features the identical tracklist as the Japanese/Asia version while adding more language options. The game was digital-only in US while a physical version was released alongside the HORI licensed drum controller in Europe. It was released on November 2.

== Reception ==
Taiko no Tatsujin: Drum & Fun!

Aggregate score
Aggregator	Score
Metacritic	78/100

Review scores
Publication	Score
Destructoid	8/10
GameSpot	7/10
Nintendo Life	7/10
Nintendo World Report	8.5/10

Heidi Kemps of Gamespot rated the game 7/10. She praised the simplicity and variety of control modes for the rhythm portion of the games, while also praising the inclusion of numerous rhythm-based mini-games for the party mode, which is compared favorably to the Rhythm Heaven series of games. However, she feels that most of the control schemes are not always optimal and that the Japanese-oriented tracklist might be daunting for newcomers. Gavin Lane of Nintendo Life also scored the game 7/10, praising the touch controls of the game and the fun selection of party games, while criticizing the excess loading screens and lackluster motion controls which is described as "unworkable".

Chris Carter of Destructoid gave the game an 8/10, praising the wide variety of songs and the various difficulty level available that allows players of all skill levels to enjoy the game. He also praised the cute presentation and solid performance of the game in portable mode. Mitchell Parton of Nintendo World Report gave the game 8.5/10 and described the game as "polished, fun and incredibly weird at times". He criticized the English translation and the broken motion controls, but feels that the solid core gameplay and inclusion of party games makes this game enjoyable with just about anyone.

== Sales ==
Taiko no Tatsujin: Drum & Fun! sold 69,984 retail copies during its first week of release in Japan according to Media Create sales figures, which made it the best selling game of the week. This is also the best debut for the series to date. As of December 2018, the game has sold more than 260,000 retail copies in Japan.

By July 2020, the game had sold over 1 million copies worldwide. By the end of 2022 the game had sold 2.24 million copies worldwide.
