= Ryuji Imaichi =

Japanese singer and actor (born 1986)

Ryuji Imaichi 今市隆二
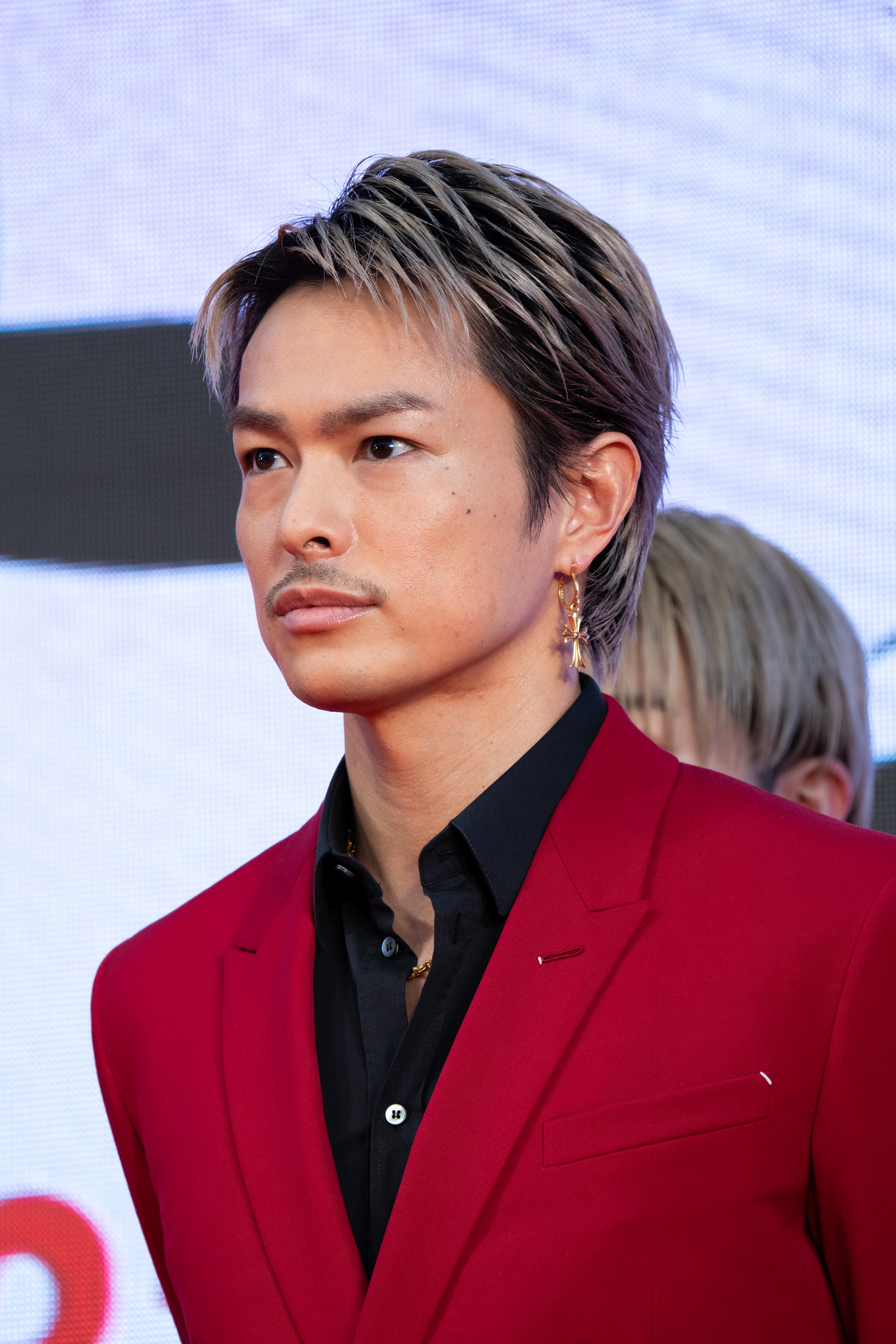
- Imaichi in 2019

Background information
- Born: September 2, 1986 (age 39); Kyoto Prefecture, Japan
- Occupation: Singer actor
- Musical career
- Genres: J-pop
- Instrument: Vocals
- Years active: 2010–present
- Label: Rhythm Zone
- Website: Official website

Ryuji Imaichi (今市 隆二, Imaichi Ryūji; born September 2, 1986, in Kyoto Prefecture, Japan) is a Japanese singer and actor. He is a vocalist of the J-pop dance and vocal group Sandaime J Soul Brothers from Exile Tribe. He joined the group after winning the Vocal Battle Audition 2, alongside Hiroomi Tosaka. As a member of Sandaime J Soul Brothers, he has received the Japan Record Awards twice. Since 2014, he has become the Thursday host for J-Wave's "Spark".

The first solo single was released in January 2018 with the digital single "One Day", while remaining a member of Sandaime J Soul Brothers. For his solo activities he uses his birth name stylized as RYUJI IMAICHI.

He debuted as an actor in 2019 in the short film On The Way of the drama anthology Sono Shunkan, Boku wa Nakitaku Natta -Cinema Fighters project-.

== Early life ==
Ryuji Imaichi was born on September 2, 1986, in Kyoto Prefecture, Japan, but was raised in Kawasaki, Kanagawa Prefecture. He played baseball in elementary school and junior high school as a pitcher. According to himself, he was a rebellious teenager and dropped out of high school at the age of 16. He then started to do different part-time jobs, including dish washing at a ramen shop, and spent his wages playing with the pachinko and slot machines in his free time. After a year and a half, one of his friends, a construction worker in the neighboring city, invited Imaichi to work together at his company and become a construction worker too. Imaichi chose to specialize in pressure welding since the job paid a higher salary than for a normal construction worker. He achieved to earn all the required licenses to become a welder.

Imaichi became a big fan of Atsushi as early as 2000 when he saw him taking part in the Asayan talent search TV show. When Atsushi debuted as the vocalist of Exile later on, Imaichi quickly became a big fan of the group and learned to sing their songs. However, he did not initially have the dream of becoming a singer. In 2006, his then girlfriend encouraged him to participate in the Vocal Battle Audition 2006: Asian Dream, an audition to find a new vocalist for Exile. He passed the first round without much preparation but failed to pass the second round. Despite his loss, he became serious about pursuing a career as a singer, and he was determined to get revenge for his failure. From that point on he started attending vocal training lessons at the Vocal Academy of Tokyo at nights, after a full day of work as a construction worker.

In 2009, he won runner up Grand Prix in the artist category of the avex WORLD AUDITION 2008, and started being enrolled in the Avex Artist Academy as a scholarship student. From 2006 to 2010, he took part in more than 100 different auditions.

== Career ==
In February 2010, Imaichi participated in the Vocal Battle Audition 2: ~Yume o Motta Wakamono-tachi e~. As he turned 24 that year, he considered this chance as the last try for his dream to become a professional singer. He passed the first round and met Hiroomi Tosaka in the second round, and they both considered each other to be strong competitors after seeing their performances for the first round on Shûkan Exile's coverage of the audition. As Imaichi and Tosaka both were selected as two of the ten finalists after the third round, it was announced that the two winners of Vocal Battle Audition 2 would become the vocalists of the new dance and vocal group Sandaime J Soul Brothers. On September 15, 2010, the final round of the audition was held at Akasaka Blitz music venue and Imaichi won the audition alongside Hiroomi Tosaka. The two officially became the vocalists of Sandaime J Soul Brothers. A few days later, as they finished recording Sandaime's first single, the seven members of the group met each other for the first time. On September 27, Imaichi and Tosaka made their first public appearance as singers during the Fantasy Goya-sai: Exile Tamashī (FANTASY後夜祭～EXILE魂～; FANTASY Late Night Festival ~EXILE Soul~) live performance from Exile at Toyota Stadium. On November 10, Sandaime J Soul Brothers with the single "Best Friend's Girl".

In February and March 2012, Tosaka participated in VBA Live Tour 2012 Vocal Battle Stage held in Tokyo and Osaka, alongside other LDH's vocalists who have participated in Vocal Battle Audition. From November 2012 to March,2013, Imaichi appeared in TBS's music variety show EX-LOUNGE. In 2013, he sang the national anthem of Japan on the stage of the IBF World Boxing Championship held in Kagawa Prefecture.

In 2014, Imaichi composed the lyrics for Sandaime J Soul Brothers' song "PRIDE", which was his first attempt at lyric composition. Since October 2014, he has become the Thursday host for J−WAVE's "SPARK". On the radio, Imaichi shares the songs and musicians that he loves with his listeners, and he introduced Brian McKnight on his very first broadcast.

In 2015, he released his first solo song "All LOVE" as part of Sandaime J Soul Brothers' album Planet Seven under the name of the group. Furthermore, he was featured on Dance Earth Party's cover of "Beautiful Name" originally by Godiego, which was released on August 5. He also featured on Crystal Kay's Japanese cover of "Very Special" by Debra Laws.

In 2016, Sandaime J Soul Brothers released a documentary about themselves, Born in the EXILE. The theme song of the documentary had the same title as the film and Ryuji Imaichi and Hiroomi Tosaka composed the lyrics of the song together to express the "soul" of the group. In the same year, Imaichi also released his first solo song under his own name titled "Forever Young At Heart" in HiGH & LOW ORIGINAL BEST ALBUM, and the song was used as part of the soundtrack for the TV shows and films of the High & Low franchise, an action and music franchise produced by LDH.

In September 2017, as Sandaime J Soul Brothers' member Kenjiro Yamashita starred in dTV×FOD's romance drama Love or Not, Imaichi was appointed as the host of a music television program titled Love or Not♪, which was part of the Love or Not project. The show ended in February 2018.

On January 12, 2018, while remaining a member of Sandaime J Soul Brothers, Imaichi made his solo debut with the digital single "ONE DAY". The single immediately took first place on Oricon's weekly digital single chart. He continued to release more digital singles throughout the year, such as "Angel" on February 16, "Thank you" on March 16 and "Alter Ego" on April 20. He also befriended his longtime idol Brian McKnight, and the two collaborated to produce Imaichi's song "Thank you" when Imaichi stayed at Mcknight's home. Furthermore, Imaichi released his first photo essay titled TIMELESS TIME on March 26, which was produced by American Artist Daniel Arsham. After releasing his first solo album LIGHT>DARKNESS on August 1, he concluded his solo activities in 2018 by going on his first tour titled Ryuji Imaichi Live Tour 2018 "Light>Darkness" from August 11 to December 24. Brian Mcknight took part in Imaichi's show in Saitama Super Arena as a guest star, and the two performed Brian McKnight's "Back At One" together.

Prior to the release of the live footage from his first solo tour on March 6, 2019, Imaichi released his 5th digital single "Yoake Mae / Kore ga Unmei Nara" (夜明け前 / これが運命なら; Before Dawn / If This is Destiny) on February 15. Furthermore, he made his acting debut in fall 2019 in the short film Uta Monogatari -CINEMA FIGHTERS project-. It was also announced that he would release his first physical single "RILY" on October 30. Furthermore, he appeared on the cover of anan's issue 2175 at the end of the year, making it first solo magazine cover in his career.

On January 15, 2020, Imaichi released his second studio album ZONE OF GOLD. In January and February, Imaichi and Hiroomi Tosaka held their first joint dome tour titled LDH PERFECT YEAR 2020 SPECIAL SHOWCASE RYUJI IMAICHI / HIROOMI TOSAKA. In January, Imaichi was also appointed as the 30th-anniversary ambassador of Jalan magazine, one of Japan's largest travel magazines. On July 1, the live footage of the joint tour, LDH PERFECT YEAR 2020 SPECIAL SHOWCASE RYUJI IMAICHI / HIROOMI TOSAKA, was released and was ranked No.1 on Oricon's weekly DVD, BD and joint DVD/BD ranking at the same time with about 50.547 copies sold in the first week.

== Personal life ==
Imaichi has a brother and a sister.

He has been a fan of Atsushi since he was a teenager, and is a big fan of Brian McKnight. Both artists deeply influenced his music style. He is often compared to Atsushi, for his resemblance to him while wearing sunglasses.

As a baseball lover, he built up a baseball team called NAKAMEGURO RYUJI 'S inside LDH, with the company's staff members and artists as its players and himself as the coach.

== Discography ==
=== Studio albums ===
Title	Details	Peak chart positions
Title	Details	JPN
Light>Darkness	Released: August 1, 2018; Label: Rhythm Zone; Formats: CD, CD/DVD, CD/Blu-ray	2
Zone of Gold	Released: January 15, 2020; Label: Rhythm Zone; Formats: CD, CD/DVD, CD/Blu-ray	4
Good Old Future	Released: November 2, 2022; Label: Rhythm Zone; Formats: CD	2
R	Released: June 26, 2024; Label: Rhythm Zone; Formats: CD	3

=== Singles ===
Title	Year	Peak chart positions		Certifications
Title	Year	JPN Oricon	JPN Hot 100	Certifications
"RILY"	2019	2	TBA	TBA

=== Digital singles ===
Year	Title	Release date	Album
2018	One Day	January 12	LIGHT>DARKNESS
2018	Angel	February 16	LIGHT>DARKNESS
2018	Thank You	March 16	LIGHT>DARKNESS
2018	Alter Ego	April 20	LIGHT>DARKNESS
2019	Yoake Mae / Kore ga Unmei Nara	February 15	

=== Other Solo Songs ===
Year	Title	Release date	Album
2015	All LOVE	January 28	Sandaime J Soul Brothers "PLANET SEVEN"
2016	Over & Over	March 30	Sandaime J Soul Brothers "The JSB Legacy"
2016	FOREVER YOUNG AT HEART	June 15	V.A."HiGH&LOW ORIGINAL BEST ALBUM"

=== Participating works ===
Year	Title	Artist	Recording	Notes	Ref.
2015	Dance Earth Party	I	Cover by Godiego		
2015	Very Special	Crystal Kay	Shine	Cover by Debra Laws	
2016	FOREVER YOUNG AT HEART	Ryuji Imaichi	HiGH & LOW ORIGINAL BEST ALBUM		
2017	P.B.E.	Jay'ed	Here I Stand		
2017	No more cry	CrazyBoy	NEOTOKYO FOREVER		

=== Video releases ===
Title	Details	Peak Chart Positions		Certifications
Title	Details	JPN DVD	JPN BD	Certifications
RYUJI IMAICHI LIVE TOUR 2018 "LIGHT>DARKNESS"	Released: March 6, 2019; Label: Rhythm Zone; Formats: 2DVD/CD, 2Blu-ray/CD	TBA	TBA	TBA
LDH PERFECT YEAR 2020 SPECIAL SHOWCASE RYUJI IMAICHI / HIROOMI TOSAKA	Insert paragraph: Released: July 1, 2020; Label: Rhythm Zone; Formats: 3DVD/CD, 3Blu-ray/CD	1	1	

=== Lyrics ===
Year	Title	Artist	Recording	Notes
2014	PRIDE	Sandaime J Soul Brothers from Exile Tribe	The Best/Blue Impact	
2015	ALL LOVE	Sandaime J Soul Brothers from Exile Tribe	Planet Seven	
2016	Born in the EXILE	Sandaime J Soul Brothers from Exile Tribe	The JSB Legacy	
2017	HAPPY	Sandaime J Soul Brothers from Exile Tribe	FUTURE	
2019	Yes We Are	Sandaime J Soul Brothers from Exile Tribe		
2019	Hanauta ~Flowers for you~	Sandaime J Soul Brothers from Exile Tribe		

== Tie-ups ==
Title	Notes	Recording
All Love	Theme song for the TV Tokyo drama, Kuroi Gashū: Kusa	Planet Seven
RILY	Theme song for the AOYAMA PRESTIGE TECHNOLOGY CM 2019	Zone of Gold
Church by the sea	Title song of the short film Cinema Fighters Project "On The Way"	

== Filmography ==
=== TV programmes ===
Year	Title	Network	Notes
2012	Ex-Lounge	TBS	
2017	Love or Not♪	dTV×FOD	MC

=== TV Dramas ===
Year	Title	Role	Network	Notes	Ref.
2016	Night Hero NAOTO	Himself	TV Tokyo	Episode 1, 4, 9	

=== Short film ===
Year	Title	Role	Ref.
2019	Cinema Fighters Project "On The Way"	Kenta	

=== Advertisements ===
Year	Title	Notes	Ref.
2013	Moist Diane "Oil Shampoo"		
2014	Samantha Thavasa		
2014	Beats by Dre		
2015	Aoyama Trading "Yōfuku no Aoyama"		
2019	AOYAMA PRESTIGE TECHNOLOGY	with Keita Machida and Nobuyuki Suzuki	

=== Radio series ===
Year	Title	Network	Notes
2011–2013	Keep On Dreaming	FM Yokohama	
2014–present	SPARK	J-Wave	Thursday's MC

=== Radio shows ===
Year	Title	Notes	References
2012	VBA Live Tour 2012 Vocal Battle Stage	February 29 to March 1 in Zepp Osaka, Osaka; March 6 and 7 in Shibuya-AX, Tokyo	
2014	Vocal Battle Audition Presents "Vocal Battle Stage 2014"	April 24 and 25, in Nippon Budokan, Tokyo	
2015	J-Wave Live Summer Jam 2015	August 9, in Yoyogi National Gymnasium, Tokyo	

== Bibliography ==
=== Photo essays ===
Year	Title	Notes	Ref.
2018	TIMELESS TIME	produced by Daniel Arsham.	

== Tours ==
Ryuji Imaichi Live Tour 2018 "Light>Darkness" (2018)

LDH Perfect Year 2020 Special Showcase Ryuji Imaichi / Hiroomi Tosaka(2020)
