= 56th Japan Record Awards =

2014 Japanese music awards ceremony

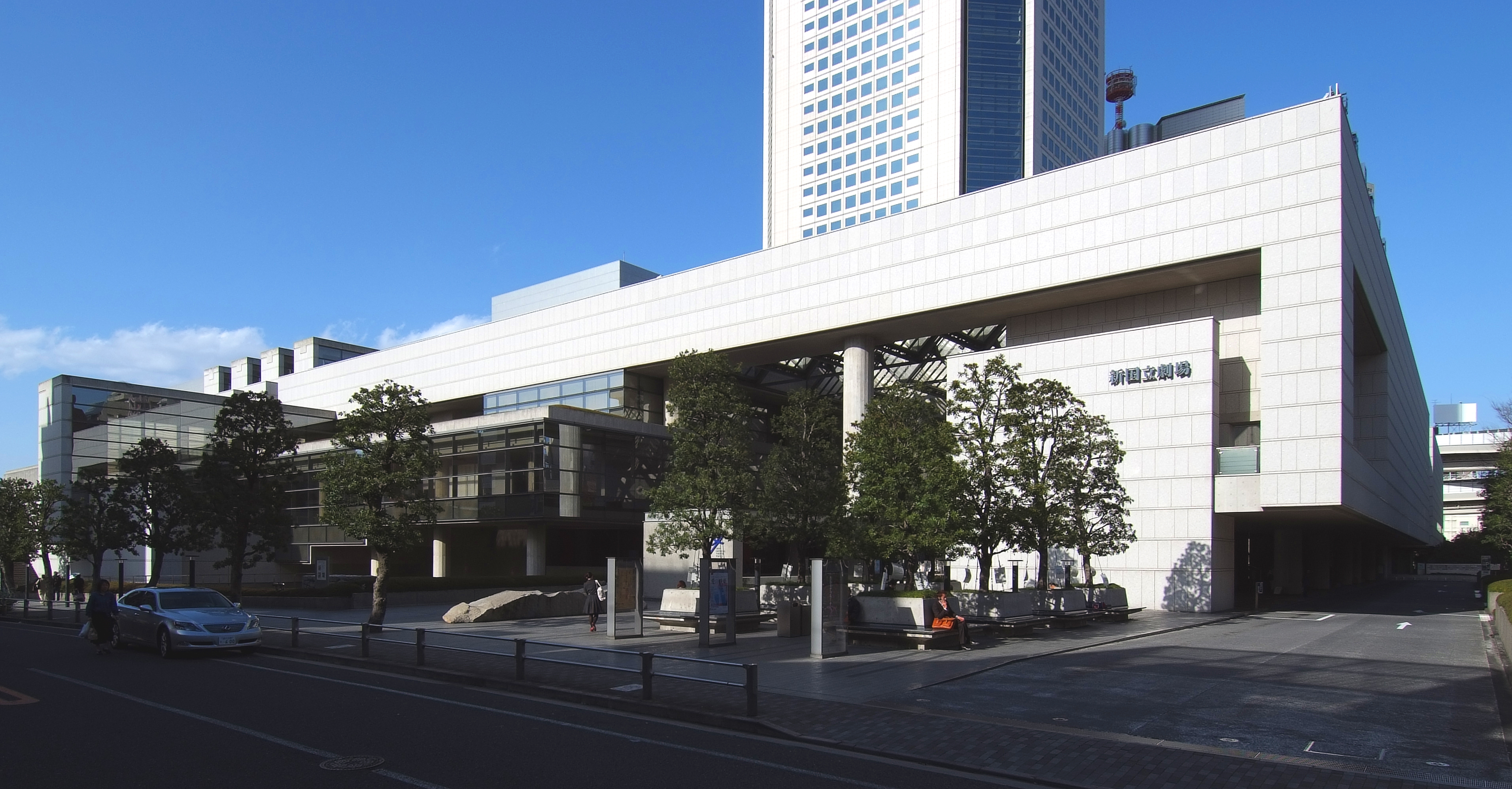
- The New National Theater where the ceremony took place
- Date: December 30, 2014
- Venue: New National Theater, Tokyo
- Country: Japan

Television/radio coverage
- Network: TBS

The 56th Japan Record Awards (第56回日本レコード大賞) took place at the New National Theater in Tokyo on December 30, 2014. The ceremony was televised in Japan on TBS.

== Presenters ==
- Shin'ichirō Azumi (TBS commentator)
- Yukie Nakama

== Winners and winning works ==
=== Grand Prix ===
- "R.Y.U.S.E.I." — Sandaime J Soul Brothers from Exile Tribe

=== Best Singer Award ===
- EXILE ATSUSHI

=== Best New Artist Award ===
- Mariya Nishiuchi (西内まりや)

=== Best Album Award ===
- TRAD - Mariya Takeuchi (竹内まりや)

=== New Artist Award ===
The artists who are awarded the New Artist Award are nominated for the Best New Artist Award.

- Sakurako Ohara (大原櫻子)
- SOLIDEMO
- Yuki Tokunaga (徳永ゆうき)
- Mariya Nishiuchi (西内まりや)

=== Lifetime Achievement Award ===
- Eiichi Ohtaki
