= List of Oricon number-one albums of 2014 =

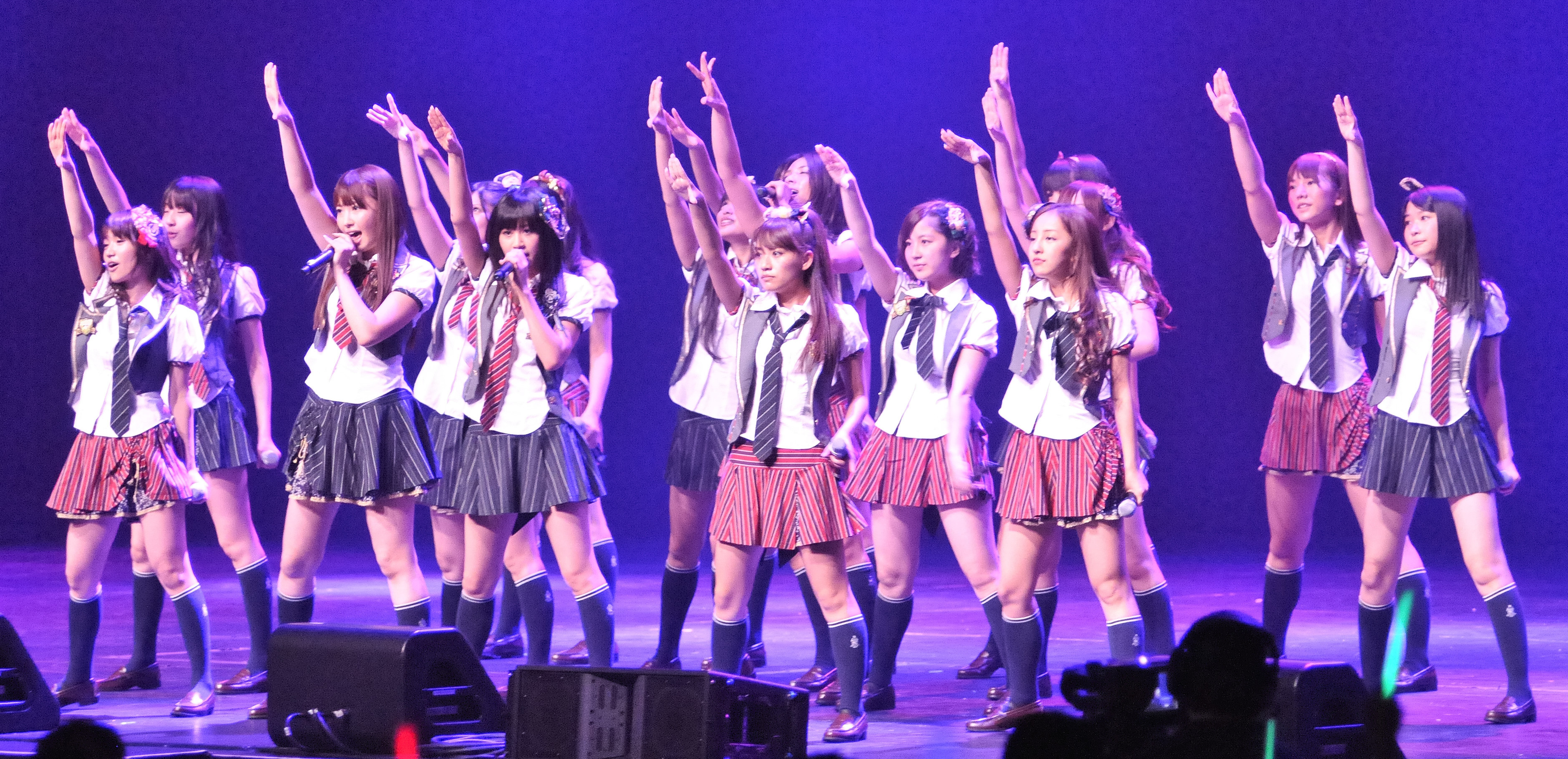
AKB48's (pictured) fifth studio album, Tsugi no Ashiato, was the best-selling album of 2014. It sold over 962,000 copies in the first week of its release becoming the best selling album in Japan in just one week.

The highest-selling albums in Japan are ranked in the weekly Oricon Albums Chart, which is published by Oricon Style magazine. The data is compiled by Oricon based on each albums' weekly physical sales. This list includes the albums that reached the number one place on that chart in 2014.

In 2014, a total of 43 albums claimed the top position of the chart. Beginning with dance and vocal group Sandaime J Soul Brothers's greatest hits/studio album, The Best/Blue Impact, issue dated January 6. AKB48's Tsugi no Ashiato was the best-selling album of 2014. The soundtrack, Frozen: Original Motion Picture Soundtrack, was the second best-selling album. With 980,000 copies sold, it became the best-selling animation film soundtrack album in Oricon history. Boy band Arashi's thirteenth studio album, The Digitalian was the third best-seller, with 785,000 copies sold.

== Chart history ==
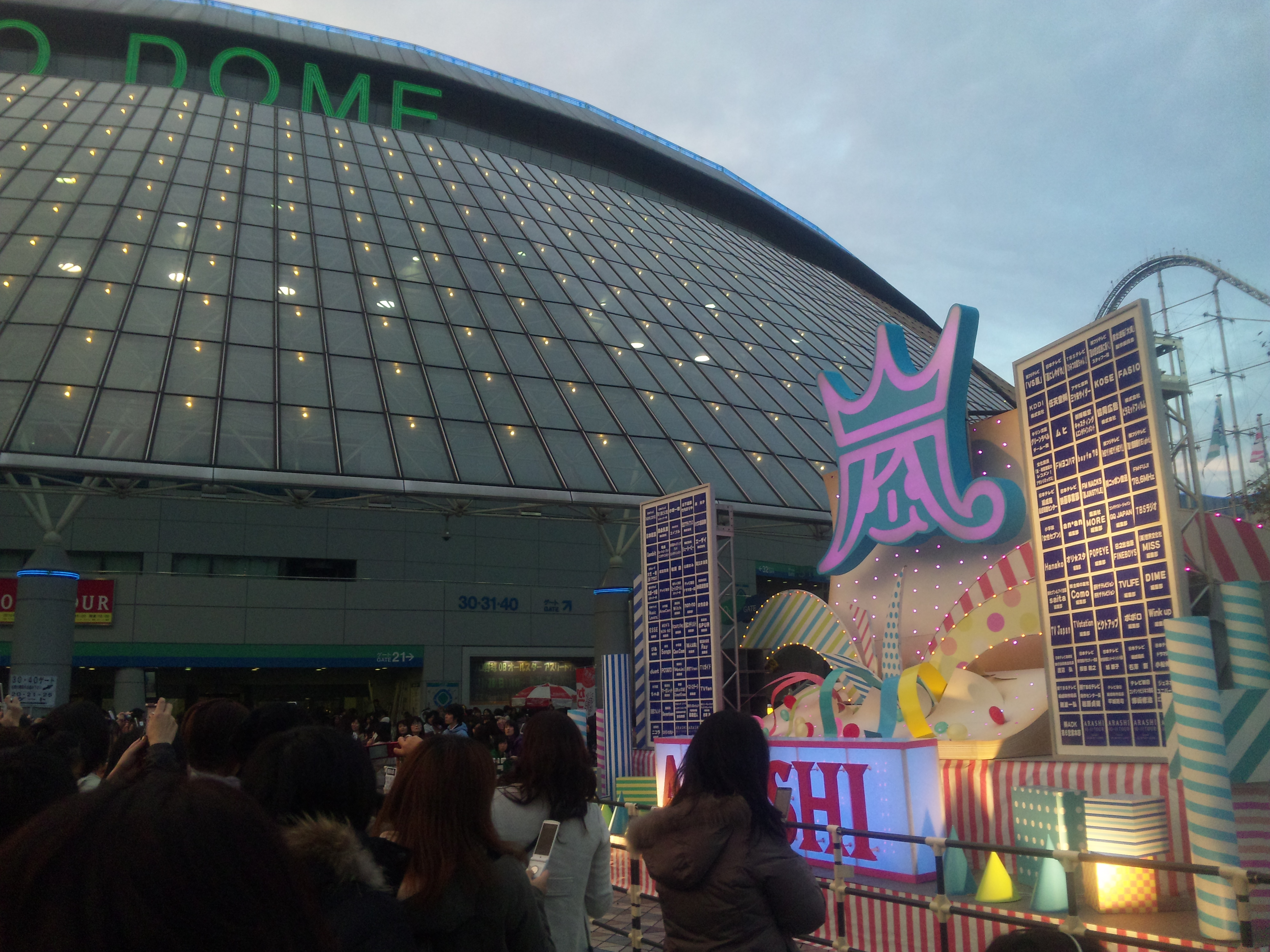
The Digitalian became the third best-seller of the year and the eleventh overall number-one album in Arashi's (signboard pictured) career.

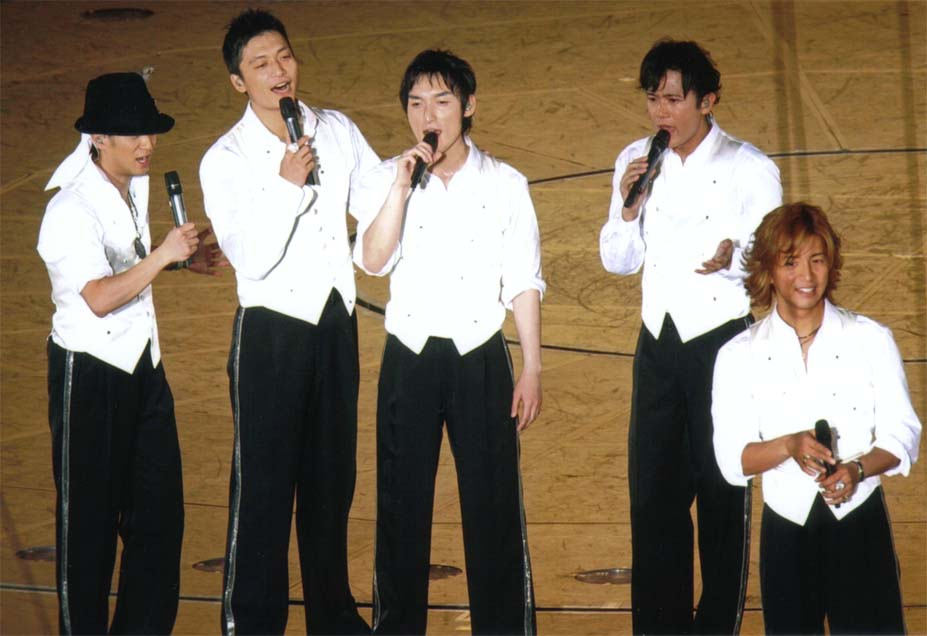
SMAP (pictured) gained their tenth number-one album with their final studio album, Mr. S. The group split in 2016.

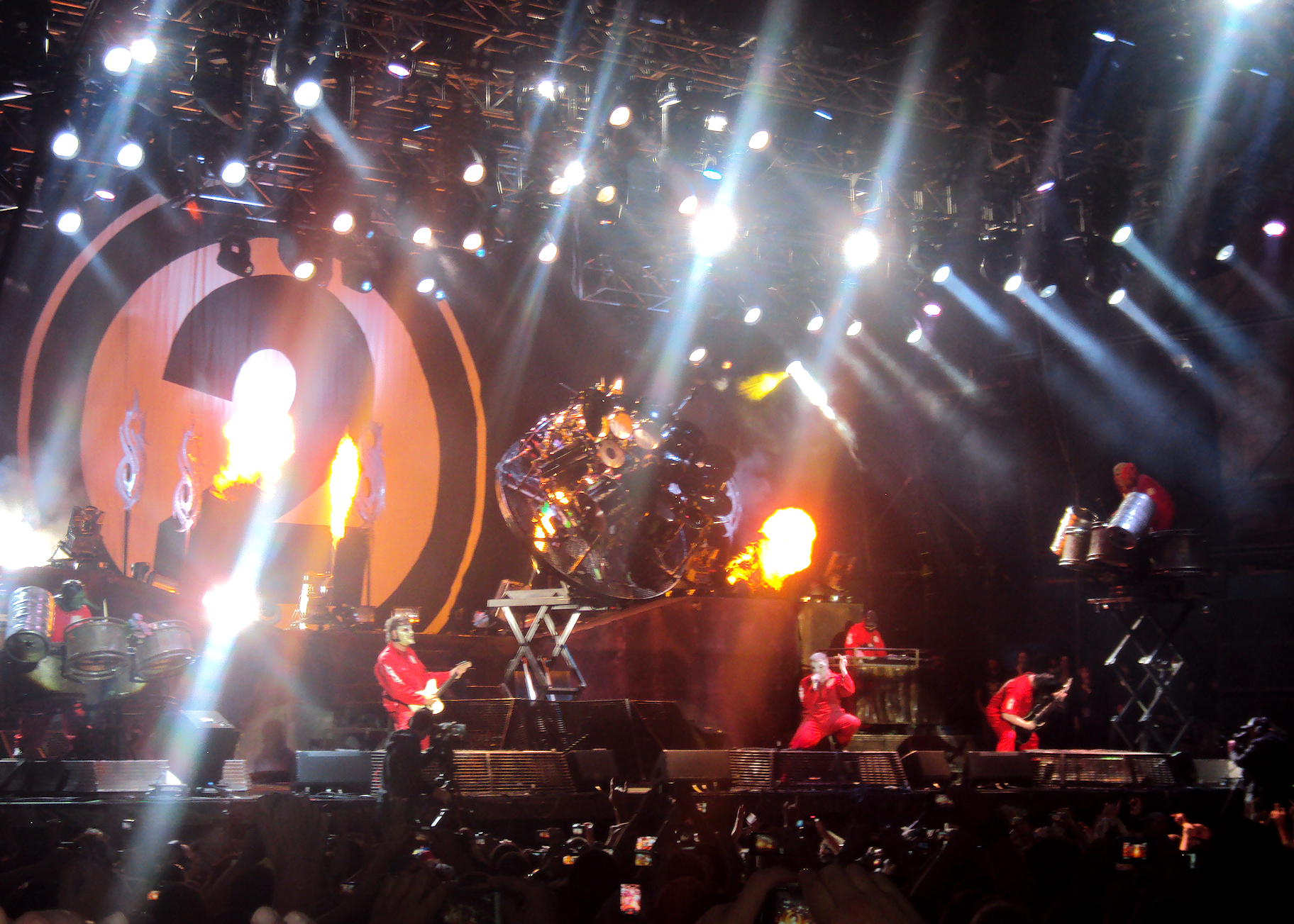
Slipknot (pictured) earned their first number-one album in Japan with their fifth effort, .5: The Gray Chapter.

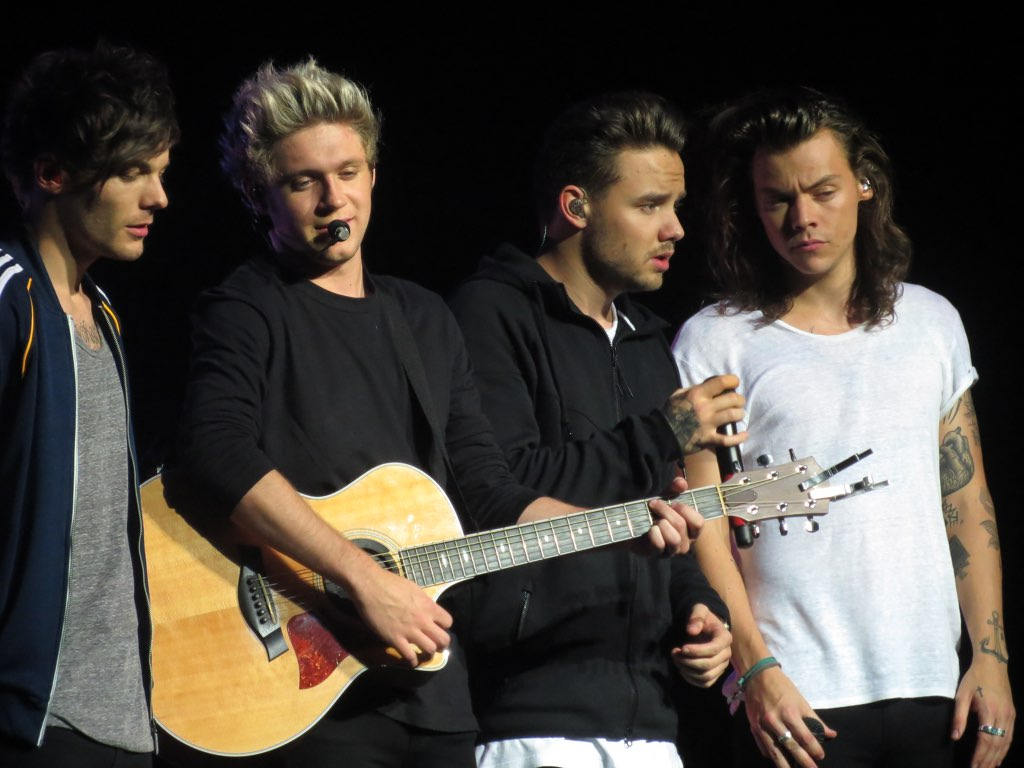
One Direction (pictured) earned their first number-one album in Japan with Four.

Key
†	Indicates best-selling album of 2014

Issue Date	Album	Artist(s)	Ref
January 6	The Best/Blue Impact	Sandaime J Soul Brothers from Exile Tribe	
January 13	The Best/Blue Impact	Sandaime J Soul Brothers from Exile Tribe	
January 20	The Best/Blue Impact	Sandaime J Soul Brothers from Exile Tribe	
January 27	The Best/Blue Impact	Sandaime J Soul Brothers from Exile Tribe	
February 3	Tsugi no Ashiato †	AKB48	
February 10	Genesis of 2PM	2PM	
February 17	The II Age	Exile The Second	
February 24	Shamanippon: Roi no Chinoi	Tsuyoshi Domoto	
March 3	Sexy Second	Sexy Zone	
March 10	Bon Voyage	Kumi Koda	
March 17	Tree	Tohoshinki	
March 24	Ray	Bump of Chicken	
March 31	Colorful Pop	E-girls	
April 7	Hit! Hit! Hit!	Kis-My-Ft2	
April 14	Human	Masaharu Fukuyama	
April 21	Human	Masaharu Fukuyama	
April 28	Supernal Liberty	Nana Mizuki	
May 5	Already	Not Yet	
May 12	Frozen	Various Artists	
May 19	Frozen	Various Artists	
May 26	Frozen	Various Artists	
June 2	Singing Bird	Koshi Inaba	
June 9	Awa no Yō na Ai datta	Aiko	
June 16	Ballada	Namie Amuro	
June 23	Ballada	Namie Amuro	
June 30	Smart	Hey! Say! JUMP	
July 7	Come Here	KAT-TUN	
July 14	Kis-My-Journey	Kis-My-Ft2	
July 21	Pika Pika Fantajin	Kyary Pamyu Pamyu	
July 28	Heart	Tokio	
August 4	The Best	Girls' Generation	
August 11	The Best	Girls' Generation	
August 18	Go West Yōi Don!	Johnny's West	
August 25	Sekai no Chuushin wa Osaka ya (Namba Jichiku)	NMB48	
September 1	Attack 25	Dreams Come True	
September 8	Exile Tribe Revolution	Exile Tribe	
September 15	Mr.S	SMAP	
September 22	Trad	Mariya Takeuchi	
September 29	Trad	Mariya Takeuchi	
October 6	I'm Your Boy	Shinee	
October 13	Gold Symphony	AAA	
October 20	You	Tomohisa Yamashita	
October 27	.5: The Gray Chapter	Slipknot	
November 3	The Digitalian	Arashi	
November 10	Delight	Daesung	
November 17	Kanjanism	Kanjani Eight	
November 24	With Love	Kana Nishino	
December 1	Four	One Direction	
December 8	The Best of Big Bang 2006-2014	Big Bang	
December 15	Love Ballade	Exile Atsushi	
December 22	M Album	KinKi Kids	
December 29	With	Tohoshinki	

== See also ==
- 2014 in Japanese music
