= The JSB Legacy =

- CD alone and digital artwork.

Studio album by Sandaime J Soul Brothers
- Released: March 30, 2016
- Recorded: April 2015 – February 2016
- Genre: J-pop
- Length: 56:18
- Language: Japanese; English
- Label: Rhythm Zone
- Producer: Exile Hiro

Sandaime J Soul Brothers chronology
Planet Seven (2015)	The JSB Legacy (2016)	The JSB World (2017)

Singles from The JSB Legacy
- 1. "Starting Over" Released: April 15, 2015; 2. "Storm Riders" Released: April 22, 2015; 3. "Summer Madness" Released: July 8, 2015; 4. "Unfair World" Released: September 2, 2015; 5. "Feel So Alive" Released: March 30, 2016 (digital single)

The JSB Legacy is the sixth studio album by Japanese group Sandaime J Soul Brothers from Exile Tribe. It was released on March 30, 2016. It reached the number-one place on the weekly Oricon Albums Chart on its release week. The album is the 2nd best-selling album of the year in Japan for 2016 and it is the fourth album by the group to reach number one.

== Track listing ==
The JSB Legacy track listing
No.	Title	Length
1.	"Feel So Alive"	4:18
2.	"Storm Riders" (featuring Slash)	3:18
3.	"Summer Madness" (featuring Afrojack)	4:37
4.	"Share the Love" (The Sharehappi from Sandaime J Soul Brothers subunit single)	4:18
5.	"Break of Dawn"	3:48
6.	"Unfair World"	5:24
7.	"Dream Girl"	3:46
8.	"Over & Over" (Ryuji Imaichi solo)	3:51
9.	"Beautiful Life"	3:32
10.	"starting over"	4:22
11.	"J.S.B.Dream"	4:58
12.	"Born in the Exile"	5:21
13.	"銀河鉄道999" (Sandaime J Soul Brothers version; bonus track)	4:45
Total length:		56:18

== Charts ==
Chart performance for The JSB Legacy
Release	Chart	Peak position	Debut sales	Sales total
March 30, 2016	Oricon Daily Albums Chart	1		
March 30, 2016	Oricon Weekly Albums Chart	1	476,120	619,000
March 30, 2016	Oricon Yearly Albums Chart	2		643,115
