= Ryusei (song) =

- CD+DVD and digital cover

Single by Sandaime J Soul Brothers

from the album Planet Seven
- B-side: "Summer Dreams Come True"; "Wedding Bell"
- Released: June 25, 2014
- Recorded: 2014
- Genre: J-Pop; EDM; electro-R&B
- Length: 5:24
- Label: Rhythm Zone
- Songwriters: STY; Maozon
- Producer: Hiro

Sandaime J Soul Brothers singles chronology
| "Sakura" (2014) | "Ryusei" (2014) | "Cosmos" (2014) |

Music video
- "R.Y.U.S.E.I." on YouTube

"Ryusei" (stylized as R.Y.U.S.E.I.) is a song recorded by Japanese group Sandaime J Soul Brothers from Exile Tribe. It was released on June 25, 2014 by rhythm zone and later included in his fifth studio album Planet Seven (2015). Musically, "Ryusei" it is a J-pop song with an EDM beat. Upon its release, it peaked at number one on the Oricon Singles Chart and due to its commercial success, topped the Billboard Japan Hot 100 of the Year 2015.

== Music video ==
The music video for "Ryusei" was filmed in Los Angeles, United States. On September 3, 2016, the number of views of the music video on YouTube exceeded 100 million, being the first video ever of Avex's YouTube channel to do so.

== Awards ==
| Year | Ceremony | Award | Result |
|---|---|---|---|
| 2014 | Japan Cable Awards | Excellence Award | Won |
| 2014 | Japan Record Awards | Grand Prix | Won |
| 2014 | Japan Record Awards | Excellent Work Award | Won |

== Track listings and formats ==
- Digital download
1. "Ryusei" – 5:24
2. "Summer Dreams Come True" – 4:07
3. "Wedding Bell: 素晴らしきかな人生" – 4:59
- CD single
1. "Ryusei" – 5:24
2. "Summer Dreams Come True" – 4:07
3. "Wedding Bell: 素晴らしきかな人生" – 4:59
4. "Ryusei" (instrumental) – 5:24
5. "Summer Dreams Come True" (instrumental) – 4:07
6. "Wedding Bell: 素晴らしきかな人生" (instrumental) – 4:59
- DVD
1. "Ryusei" (music video)

== Charts ==
=== Weekly charts ===
| Chart (2014) | Peak position |
|---|---|
| Japan (Japan Hot 100) | 1 |
| Japan (Oricon) | 1 |

=== Year-end charts ===
| Chart (2014) | Position |
|---|---|
| Japan (Japan Hot 100) | 19 |
| Japan (Oricon) | 30 |

| Chart (2015) | Position |
|---|---|
| Japan (Japan Hot 100) | 1 |

== Certifications ==
| Region | Certification | Certified units/sales |
|---|---|---|
| Japan (RIAJ) Physical single | Gold | 100,000^{^} |
| Japan (RIAJ) Digital single | Million | 1,000,000^{*} |
Streaming
| Japan (RIAJ) | Platinum | 100,000,000^{†} |
^{*} Sales figures based on certification alone.^{^} Shipments figures based on certification alone.^{†} Streaming-only figures based on certification alone.

| Preceded by "Exile Pride (Konna Sekai o Ai Suru Tame)" (Exile) | Japan Record Award Grand Prix; 2014 | Succeeded by "Unfair World" (Sandaime J Soul Brothers) |
