= The JSB World =

THE JSB WORLD

Greatest hits album by Sandaime J Soul Brothers
- Released: March 29, 2017
- Language: Japanese
- Label: Rhythm Zone (Avex Trax)

Sandaime J Soul Brothers chronology
THE JSB LEGACY (2016)	THE JSB WORLD (2017)	Future (2018)

The JSB World (styled THE JSB WORLD) is a greatest hits album by Japanese pop boy-band Sandaime J Soul Brothers. It was released on March 29, 2017. It was number-one on the Oricon Weekly Albums Chart on its release, selling 356,772 copies. It was also number-one on the Billboard Japan Weekly Top Albums Sales Chart. By the end of 2017 the album had sold a total of 467,005 copies.

== Track listing ==
Disc 1
No.	Title	Length
1.	"Best Friend's Girl"
2.	"On Your Mark〜ヒカリのキセキ〜"
3.	"LOVE SONG"
4.	"Japanese Soul Brothers"
5.	"FIGHTERS"
6.	"リフレイン"
7.	"NEW WORLD"
8.	"Go my way"
9.	"最後のサクラ"
10.	"花火"
11.	"(YOU SHINE)THE WORLD"
12.	"Kiss You Tonight"
13.	"LET'S PARTY"
14.	"Powder Snow 〜永遠に終わらない冬〜"
15.	"FLAP YOUR WINGS"

Disc 2
No.	Title	Length
1.	"LOOK @ US NOW!"
2.	"SPARK"
3.	"Higher"
4.	"空に住む〜Living in your sky〜"
5.	"BURNING UP"
6.	"Waking Me Up"
7.	"冬物語"
8.	"T.T.T. (Top To Toe)"
9.	"SO RIGHT"
10.	"S.A.K.U.R.A."
11.	"風の中、歩き出す"
12.	"R.Y.U.S.E.I."
13.	"Summer Dreams Come True"
14.	"Wedding Bell ～素晴らしきかな人生～"
15.	"C.O.S.M.O.S. 〜秋桜〜"
16.	"Glory"

Disc 3
No.	Title	Length
1.	"O.R.I.O.N."
2.	"Eeny, meeny, miny, moe!"
3.	"starting over"
4.	"STORM RIDERS feat. SLASH"
5.	"J.S.B. DREAM"
6.	"Summer Madness feat. Afrojack"
7.	"Unfair World"
8.	"Feel So Alive"
9.	"Share The Love"
10.	"Born in the EXILE"
11.	"MUGEN ROAD"
12.	"Welcome to TOKYO"
13.	"BRIGHT"
14.	"HAPPY"
15.	"J.S.B. LOVE"

== Charts ==
Chart (2017)	Peak position
Japan Oricon Weekly Albums Chart	1
Japan Billboard Weekly Top Albums Sales Chart	1
Japan Billboard Weekly Hot Albums	1
