= Ponyo =

2008 Japanese animated film by Hayao Miyazaki

- Theatrical release poster

Japanese name
- Kanji: 崖の上のポニョ
Transcriptions
- Revised Hepburn: Gake no Ue no Ponyo
- Directed by: Hayao Miyazaki
- Written by: Hayao Miyazaki
- Produced by: Toshio Suzuki
- Starring: Tomoko Yamaguchi; Kazushige Nagashima; Yūki Amami; George Tokoro; Yuria Nara; Hiroki Doi; Rumi Hiiragi; Akiko Yano; Kazuko Yoshiyuki; Tomoko Naraoka
- Cinematography: Atsushi Okui
- Edited by: Takeshi Seyama
- Music by: Joe Hisaishi
- Production company: Studio Ghibli
- Distributed by: Toho
- Release date: July 19, 2008
- Running time: 101 minutes
- Country: Japan
- Language: Japanese
- Budget: ¥3.4 billion (US$34 million)
- Box office: US$205.9 million

Ponyo (Note: Japanese: 崖の上のポニョ, Hepburn: Gake no Ue no Ponyo; lit. 'Ponyo on the Cliff') (Note: Early press information gave the English title of the film as Ponyo on the Cliff by the Sea) is a 2008 Japanese animated fantasy film written and directed by Hayao Miyazaki. It was animated by Studio Ghibli for the Nippon Television Network, Dentsu, Hakuhodo DY Media Partners, Buena Vista Home Entertainment, Mitsubishi, and distributed by Toho. The film stars Yuria Nara, Hiroki Doi, Tomoko Yamaguchi, Kazushige Nagashima, Yūki Amami, George Tokoro, Rumi Hiiragi, Akiko Yano, Kazuko Yoshiyuki and Tomoko Naraoka. It is the eighth film Miyazaki directed for Studio Ghibli, and his tenth overall.

The film tells the story of Ponyo, a goldfish-like creature who escapes from the ocean and is helped by a five-year-old human boy named Sōsuke, after she is washed ashore while trapped in a glass jar. As they bond with each other, Ponyo desires to become a human girl, against the devastating circumstances brought about by her acquisition and use of magic.

The film was originally released in Japan on July 19, 2008, by distributor Toho. It was a major commercial success, grossing over $204 million worldwide and becoming the tenth-highest-grossing anime film of all time. It received critical acclaim for its uplifting themes, visual design, and simultaneous appeal towards young children and all audiences.

An English-language version of the film was released on August 14, 2009, to 927 theatres across the U.S., the widest opening for a Studio Ghibli film in the U.S. It was produced by The Kennedy/Marshall Company and released by Walt Disney Studios Motion Pictures through their Walt Disney Pictures banner.

== Plot ==
Fujimoto, a misanthropic wizard who was once a human, lives underwater with his daughter Brunhilde and her numerous smaller sisters, who are goldfish-like creatures with human faces. While she and her siblings are on an outing with their father in his four-flippered submarine, Brunhilde sneaks off and floats away on the back of a jellyfish. After an encounter with a fishing trawler, she becomes trapped in a glass jar and drifts to the shore of a small fishing town where she is rescued by a five-year-old boy named Sōsuke. While shattering the jar with a rock, Sōsuke cuts his finger. Brunhilde licks his blood, healing the wound almost instantly. Sōsuke names her Ponyo and promises to protect her. Meanwhile, a distraught Fujimoto searches frantically for his lost daughter whom he believes to have been kidnapped. He calls his wave spirits to recover her, leaving Sōsuke heartbroken and confused by what happened.

Ponyo refuses to let her father call her by her birth name, declaring her desire to be a human named Ponyo. She magically begins changing into a human, a power granted to her by Sōsuke's human blood that she licked. Fujimoto forces her back into her true form and leaves to summon Ponyo's mother, Gran Mamare. Meanwhile, Ponyo, with the help of her sisters, breaks away from her father and inadvertently uses his magic to make herself human. The huge amount of magic that she releases into the ocean causes an imbalance in nature, resulting in a tsunami. Ponyo goes back to Sōsuke, who is amazed and overjoyed to see her. His mother, Lisa, allows her to stay at their house. Lisa leaves after the tsunami subsides to check up on the residents of the nursing home where she works, promising Sōsuke that she will return home as soon as possible.

Gran Mamare arrives at Fujimoto's submarine. Sōsuke's father, Kōichi, sees her traveling and recognizes her as the Goddess of Mercy. Fujimoto notices the moon appears to be falling out of its orbit and satellites are falling like shooting stars, symptoms of the dangerous imbalance of nature that now exists. Gran Mamare reassures him, and declares that if Sōsuke can pass a test, Ponyo can live as a human and the balance of nature will be restored. Fujimoto, still worried, reminds her that if Sōsuke fails the test, Ponyo will turn into sea foam.

The next day, Sōsuke and Ponyo find that most of the land around the house has been covered by the ocean. Since it is impossible for Lisa to come home, the two decide to find her. With Ponyo's magic, they make Sōsuke's pop-pop boat bigger to traverse the waters, seeing marine life from the Late Devonian period and more people on boats. When they reach the forest, however, Ponyo tires and falls asleep, and the boat slowly reverts to its original size. Sōsuke drags Ponyo to the shore, where he finds Lisa's abandoned car. As they continue walking, Ponyo mysteriously reverts to her fish form. Meanwhile, Gran Mamare grants Lisa and the residents of the nursing home the temporary ability to breathe in water. Ponyo and Sōsuke encounter Fujimoto, who warns the boy about the imbalance of nature and begs him to return Ponyo to him. Despite their attempt to escape, Fujimoto captures them and transports them to the protected nursing home.

Sōsuke reunites with Lisa and meets Gran Mamare, with whom Lisa has just had a long private conversation. Gran Mamare asks him if he can love Ponyo whether she is a fish or human; Sōsuke confirms that he does. She then informs her daughter that she must relinquish her magical powers if she decides to permanently transform into a human. Ponyo agrees, and she is encased in a bubble given to Sōsuke, who is instructed to kiss it to complete Ponyo's transformation, as the balance of nature is restored. The previously stranded ships head back to port. Fujimoto respects his daughter's choice, having decided he can trust Sōsuke. Ponyo then joyfully jumps high in the air and kisses Sōsuke, completing her transformation into a human.

== Cast ==
Character name	Japanese voice actor	English voice actor
Ponyo (ポニョ)	Yuuri Nara	Noah Cyrus
Sōsuke (宗介)	Hiroki Doi	Frankie Jonas
Lisa (リサ, Risa)	Tomoko Yamaguchi	Tina Fey
Kōichi (耕一)	Kazushige Nagashima	Matt Damon
Gran Mamare (グランマンマーレ)	Yūki Amami	Cate Blanchett
Fujimoto (フジモト)	George Tokoro	Liam Neeson
Ponyo's sisters	Akiko Yano	Akiko Yano
Toki (トキ)	Kazuko Yoshiyuki	Lily Tomlin
Yoshie (ヨシエ)	Tomoko Naraoka	Betty White
Noriko (ノリコ)	Tokie Hidari	Cloris Leachman
Kumiko (クミコ)	Emi Hiraoka	Jennessa Rose

== Production ==
=== Development ===
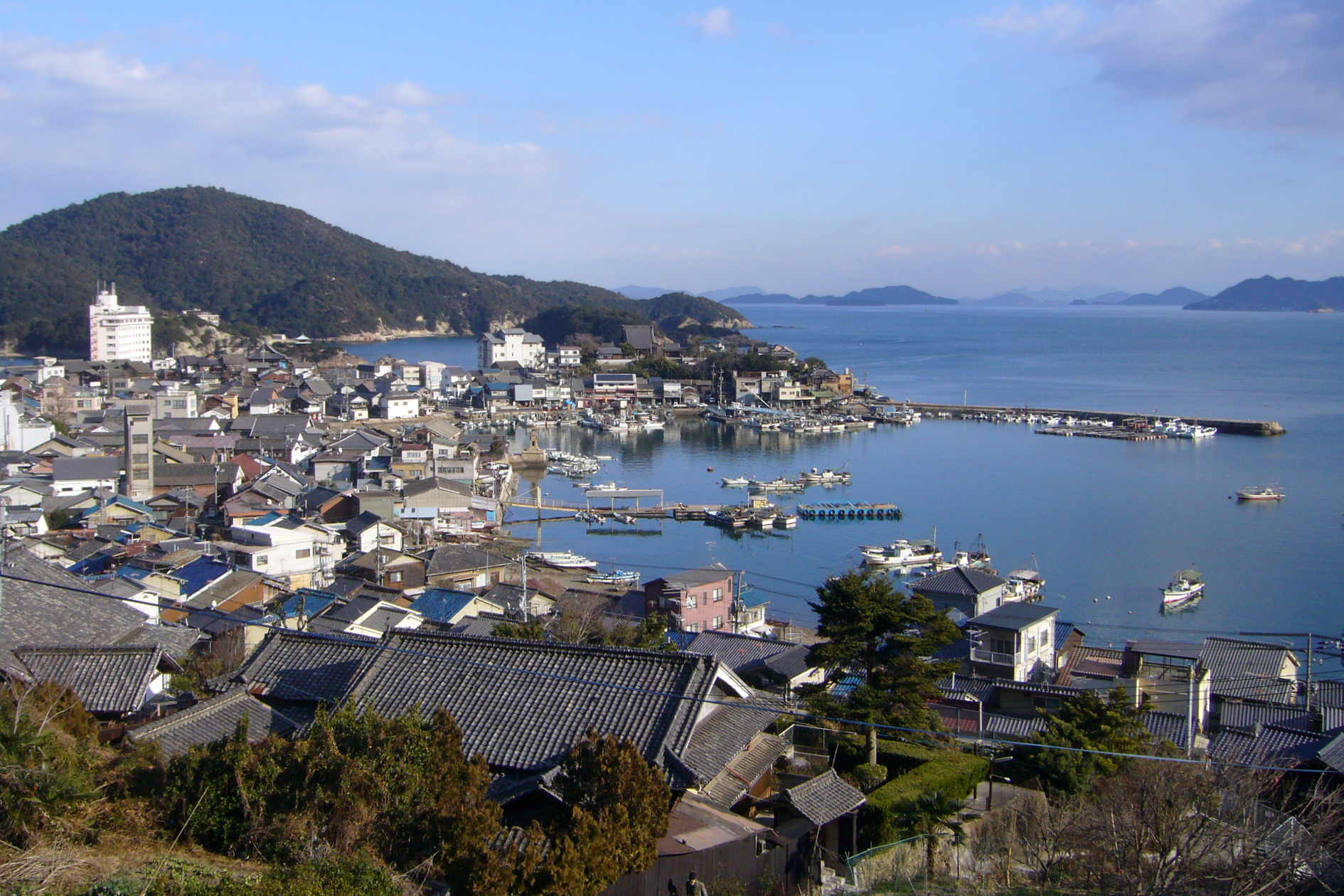
The setting for Ponyo was inspired by the real-life town of Tomonoura in Japan.

Hayao Miyazaki, the film's director and writer, was prompted to create Ponyo after producer Toshio Suzuki suggested he make a film aimed at children, noting the success of Howl's Moving Castle (2004). The film would be created from a mixture of real-world and fictional influences, combined with a desire to implement new art and animation approaches developed by other Studio Ghibli staff in a feature-length film. In 2004 and 2005, Miyazaki spent time in Tomonoura, a seaside town in Setonaikai National Park, where he familiarised himself with its community and environment. His experience in Tomonoura established the kind of setting he wanted for his next film. During his time there, he read the complete works of Natsume Sōseki. He took particular interest in The Gate, a book involving a character named Sōsuke who lived at the bottom of a cliff. This provided him more concrete ideas for characters and settings. Initially, Miyazaki solely considered the concept of a film that would depict a stormy sea with "waves higher than the house on a hillside". He later created the character Ponyo, a name he thought of as an onomatopoeia of what "soft, squishy softness" feels like when touched. Miyazaki recalled that as a nine-year-old he borrowed a copy of Hans Christian Andersen's "The Little Mermaid" from his neighbour, and that while he was reading it, he had difficulty accepting its premise that its protagonist did not have a soul.

When preparing pre-production materials, Miyazaki hit a creative block before visiting the Tate Britain art museum, where he found himself startled by the 1852 painting Ophelia by the English painter John Everett Millais and its attention to detail. He remarked, "I thought, my work is shoddy compared to those artists. I was just astonished. At that point, it became clear to me. Our animation style could not go on as before." At the time Katsuya Kondō, Miyazaki's colleague, had been the animation director of House Hunting (2006), a 12-minute short film made for screening at the Ghibli Museum. The short used solid and simple lines, and largely used hand-drawn animation. During the production of the short, Kondō had discussed the possibility of producing a feature-length film like this. Kondō accepted an offer to work on the next Studio Ghibli feature film soon after completing the short, identifying an opportunity to progress the ideas behind House Hunting with more consideration to story.

Production of Ponyo began in May 2006. Kondō was given the role of animation supervisor, and worked closely with Miyazaki in outlining a set of goals that defined the direction of the project, including the use of traditional animation throughout production. Borrowing from Kondō's experience in animating House Hunting, Ponyo would use solid and simple lines; in isolating basic animation elements, the film would aim to demonstrate the advantages of hand drawn animation through the depiction of motion that cannot be reproduced in any other medium. An example of the simple style is when Miyazaki painted a picture of Ponyo riding on a flock of fish, called "Ponyo is Here", which was inspired by him listening to "Ride of the Valkyries" while writing a letter to his staff about going with a more elemental style. This would later become a scene in the film. In normal productions, animating a sailing ship would usually involve drawing one cel and sliding it across the frame, which would fix it in a predefined perspective and direction. Miyazaki, however, wanted the ships that appeared in Ponyo to be drawn frame-by-frame. A few previous Studio Ghibli films used computer-generated imagery (CGI), the earliest being Princess Mononoke (1997). For the production of Ponyo however, the computer graphics section at the studio was closed to prioritize hand-drawn animation.

Some elements of the film were inspired by Richard Wagner's opera Die Walküre. Ponyo's birth name, Brunhilde, is a deliberate reference to the eldest of the nine legendary Valkyrie and Wagner's Brünnhilde. The music also makes reference to Wagner's opera. The character of Sōsuke is based on Miyazaki's son Gorō Miyazaki when he was five.

Miyazaki wanted his next film to be a sequel to Ponyo, but producer Toshio Suzuki convinced him to make The Wind Rises instead.

=== Music ===
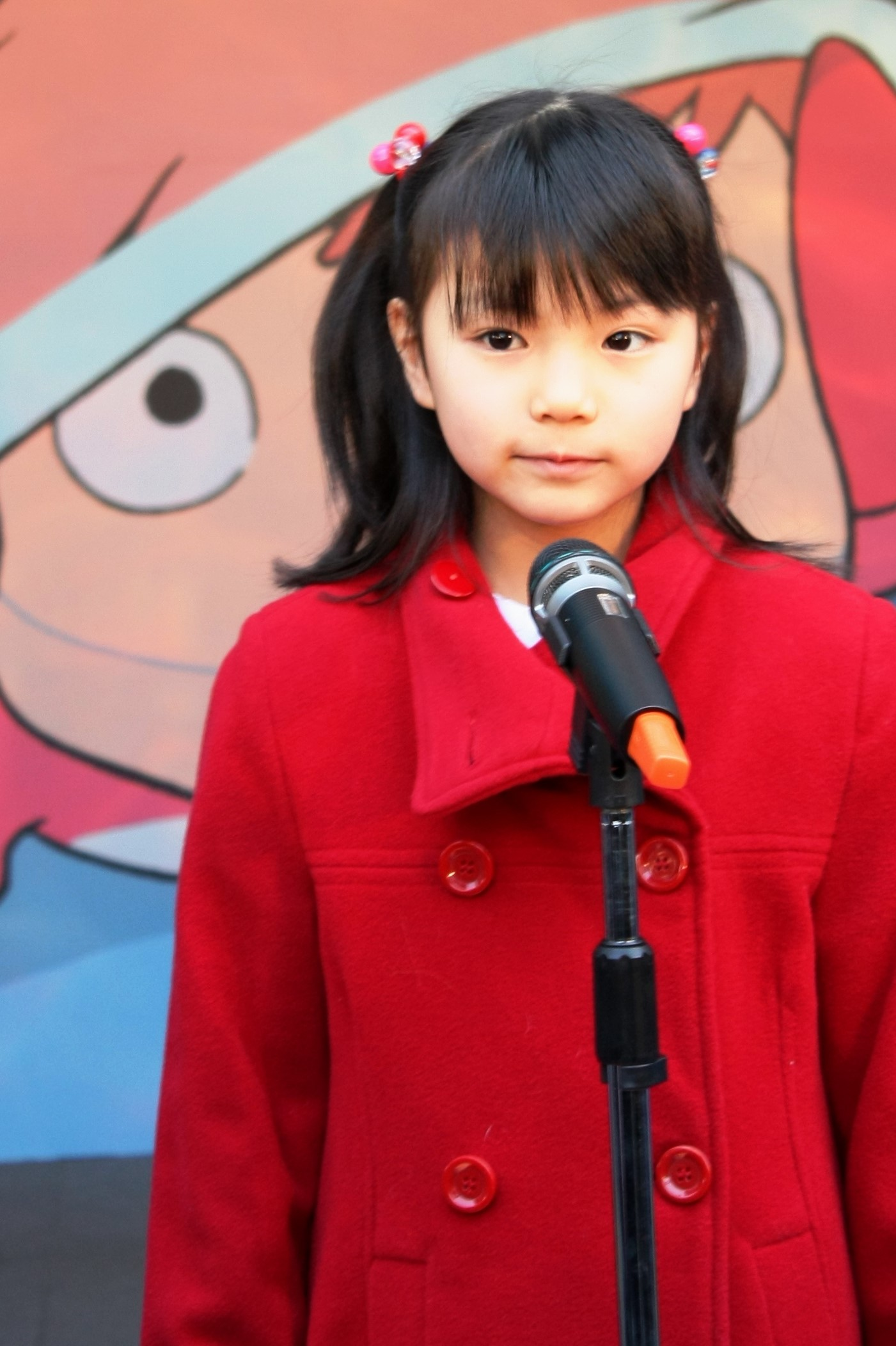
Nozomi Ōhashi, January 2009, who also voices Karen in the original Japanese version

Ponyo's eponymous theme song, "Gake no Ue no Ponyo", was released ahead of the film on December 5, 2007, performed by Fujioka Fujimaki (a duo consisting of Takaaki Fujioka and Naoya Fujimaki who are known for their underground band Marichans from the 1970s) and eight-year-old Nozomi Ōhashi. It entered the top 100 on the Oricon Weekly Charts on July 14, then rose to 24th on July 21, then 6th on July 28, and after the release of the film it ranked 3rd on August 4. By the end of 2008, it was ranked as the 14th highest selling single on the Oricon Yearly Charts. Ōhashi was also the youngest participant in the 59th NHK Kōhaku Uta Gassen, beating Cute's Mai Hagiwara's record at age 11. Afterward, Ōhashi announced her unit with Fujioka Fujimaki was disbanding.

An English-translated pop version of the theme was recorded by Jonas and Cyrus to tie in with the film's English release. The theme plays over the second half of the English version's closing credits; the first half is a translated version of the theme rather than a remix.

The film score of Ponyo was composed by Joe Hisaishi, Miyazaki's regular collaborator. The score album, published on compact disc in Japan by Tokuma Japan Communications, in South Korea by Pony Canyon Korea and throughout Europe by Germany-based label Colosseum, received a great deal of press in the West, including positive reviews from several veteran film music reviewers.

== Distribution ==
=== Japan ===
The film was released by Toho on July 19, 2008, in theatres across Japan on 481 screens—a record for a domestic film. As it had beaten Pokémon: Giratina & the Sky Warrior (which had opened on the same day). It grossed ¥10 billion ($91 million) in its first month of release, and a total of ¥15.0 billion ($153.1 million) as of November 9, 2008.

Tokyo Anime Fair chose Ponyo as Animation of the Year of 2008, as revealed in a press release by Anime News Network.

The film was released on VHS and DVD by Walt Disney Studios Home Entertainment on July 3, 2009, and on Blu-ray on December 8, 2009. Ponyo was the last Studio Ghibli film and last anime as a whole to be released on VHS, and the first Studio Ghibli film to be released on Blu-ray, although several Ghibli documentaries had been released on the format by Disney Japan prior to the release.

=== International ===
Ponyo was released in the U.S. and Canada on August 14, 2009, by Walt Disney Studios Motion Pictures through their Walt Disney Pictures banner and The Kennedy/Marshall Company, opening at a wide release at 927 theaters across America, which is by far the widest release for a Studio Ghibli film ever in the U.S., as compared to other Miyazaki films (Spirited Away opened in 26 theaters, Howl's Moving Castle opened in 36 theaters, and Princess Mononoke opened in 38 theaters).

The film's English dub was directed by John Lasseter, Brad Lewis and Peter Sohn of Pixar and produced by Frank Marshall, Hayao Miyazaki, John Lasseter, Steve Alpert, and Kathleen Kennedy; the English script was written by Melissa Mathison. In July 2009, there were multiple pre-screenings of the film in California. Miyazaki traveled to America to promote this film by speaking at the University of California, Berkeley, and San Diego Comic-Con.

Ponyo was released in Southeast Asia on January 1, 2009.

Walt Disney Studios Home Entertainment released the film on DVD and Blu-ray on March 2, 2010, as the first film produced by Ghibli or directed by either Miyazaki or Takahata to be released on Blu-ray in America. GKIDS re-issued the film on Blu-ray and DVD on October 17, 2017, under a new deal with Studio Ghibli. The film was re-released from March 25 to 28, 2018, for its 10th anniversary.

== Reception ==
=== Box office ===
On its opening weekend in the United States and Canada, it made $3,585,852 on 927 screens, which is a per screen average of $3,868. It also opened at number nine at the United States and Canada box office. The film made a total of $15,743,471 in the United States and Canada and $187,461,411 in other countries for a worldwide total of $203,204,882. It was released on DVD and Blu-ray, as well as a DVD/Plush Toy pack, on March 2, 2010.

=== Critical response ===
Ponyo received critical acclaim. (Note: Attributed to multiple references:) Rotten Tomatoes compiled 174 reviews and determined that 91% were positive, with an average score of 7.6/10. The critics consensus on the website states, "While not Miyazaki's best film, Ponyo is a visually stunning fairy tale that's a sweetly poetic treat for children and Miyazaki fans of all ages." On Metacritic, the film has a weighted average score of 86 out of 100, based on 29 reviews, indicating "universal acclaim".

The Japan Times gave the film four out of five stars, praised its simple thematic elements and its visual scheme, and compared the film to Miyazaki's classic animation My Neighbor Totoro.

Critics at the Venice International Film Festival generally had high praise. Wendy Ide of The Times said Ponyo "is as chaotic and exuberant as a story told by a hyperactive toddler," and gave it 4 stars out of 5. Roger Ebert of the Chicago Sun-Times gave the film four out of four stars, stating that, "There is a word to describe Ponyo, and that word is magical. This poetic, visually breathtaking work by the greatest of all animators has such deep charm that adults and children will both be touched. It's wonderful and never even seems to try: It unfolds fantastically."

=== Awards ===
The film was rated #2 on Dentsu's list of "2008 Hit Products in Japan", after the Wii console.

Ponyo was an entrant in the 65th Venice International Film Festival. It received a special mention in the Bologna Future Film Festival, for "the high artistic and expressive quality of animation able to give form to wonderful imagination of the worldwide cinema master".

In 2009, Ponyo won five awards at the 8th annual Tokyo Anime Awards. The awards included "Anime of the year" and "Best domestic feature". Miyazaki received the award for best director and best original story, and Noboru Yoshida received the award for best art direction.

The film won the awards for Animation of the Year and Outstanding Achievement in Music at the 32nd Japan Academy Prize.
