= Planet Seven =

Studio album by Sandaime J Soul Brothers from Exile Tribe
- Released: January 28, 2015
- Genre: J-Pop, Electropop, EDM, R&B
- Length: 57:49
- Label: Rhythm zone

Sandaime J Soul Brothers from Exile Tribe chronology
The Best/Blue Impact (2014)	Planet Seven (2015)	THE JSB LEGACY (2016)

Planet Seven (styled as PLANET SEVEN) is the 5th album by Japanese group Sandaime J Soul Brothers from Exile Tribe. It was released on January 28, 2015. It reached the number-one place on the weekly Oricon Albums Chart and stayed at number-one for two weeks. It was the best-selling album in the first half of the year in Japan, with 820,470 copies and it was the 2nd best-selling album of the year in Japan, with 868,247 copies.

== Track listing ==
No.	Title	Length
1.	"Eeny, meeny, miny, moe!"	3:54
2.	"R.Y.U.S.E.I"	5:27
3.	"S.A.K.U.R.A"	4:50
4.	"Glory"	3:51
5.	"C.O.S.M.O.S"	4:10
6.	"Link" (Hiroomi Tosaka self composed solo)	4:46
7.	"Wedding Bell ～素晴らしきかな人生～"	4:59
8.	"Summer Dreams Come True"	4:07
9.	"All LOVE" (Ryuji Imaichi self composed solo)	6:40
10.	"風の中､歩き出す"	4:54
11.	"O.R.I.O.N."	5:01
12.	"O.R.I.O.N. -Maozon @ASYtokyo remix- (Bonus Track)"	5:10
Total length:		57:49

== Charts ==
Planet Seven - Oricon Sales Chart (Japan)

Release	Chart	Peak position	Debut sales	Sales total
January 28, 2015	Oricon Daily Albums Chart	1		
January 28, 2015	Oricon Weekly Albums Chart	1	508,337	*RIAJ: Million
January 28, 2015	Oricon Yearly Albums Chart	2		
