= Fujioka Fujimaki =

Japanese folk musical group

Fujioka Fujimaki 藤岡藤巻
- Origin: Japan
- Genres: J-Pop, folk
- Years active: 2003–present
- Labels: DefStar Records (2008-present)
- Members: Takaaki Fujioka; Naoya Fujimaki
- Website: Official Site

Fujioka Fujimaki (藤岡藤巻) is a Japanese folk band, created from two members of the 1970s novelty group Marichans (まりちゃんズ, Marichanzu), Takaaki Fujioka (藤岡 孝章) and Naoya Fujimaki (藤巻 直哉). They are best known for their collaboration with the eight-year-old singer Nozomi Ōhashi for the theme song of the Studio Ghibli film Ponyo.

== Biography ==
Former bandmates Takaaki Fujioka and Naoya Fujimaki decided they wanted to form a unit together in 2003. Originally it was titled Fujioka-kun to Fujimaki-kun (藤岡君と藤巻君), however from the advice from their friend AKB48 producer Yasushi Akimoto shortened it. The duo debuted under SME Records in 2006 with the single "Yoroketa Hyōshi ni Tachiagare!." The duo released two solo singles and two albums between 2006 and 2007, however none of these charted on Oricon's charts.

Since then, the group have collaborated with several artists for musical releases. They have written a song for AA-Chino, "Hayaku Koikoi Wrecker-sha," duetted with Country Musume member Mai Satoda on her first single released for the variety show Quiz! Hexagon II, and wrote a song sung by Aya Matsuura for a FamilyMart commercial, "Kitchen and Chicken" (キチンとチキン, Kichin to Chikin).

Their greatest success came from duetting with then eight-year-old Nozomi Ōhashi for the Studio Ghibli film Ponyo. The song was a massive success, reaching #3 on Oricon's single charts, topped the RIAJ ringtone download chart for a month, and won a special award at the 50th Japan Record Awards.

The group went on hiatus between November 2008 and January 2009 due to Fujioka's ill health.

== Discography ==
=== Albums ===
Year	Album Information	Oricon Albums Charts
2006	Fujioka Fujimaki I: Released: September 13, 2006; Label: Sony (SECL-426/7); Formats: CD	—
2007	Fujioka Fujimaki III: Released: April 18, 2007; Label: Sony (SECL-493); Formats: CD	—

=== Singles ===
Release	Title	Oricon Singles Charts	Oricon sales	Album
2005	"Yoroketa Hyōshi ni Tachiagare!" (よろけた拍子に立ち上がれ!, Make a Stumbled Beat!)	—	—	Fujioka Fujimaki I
2006	"Musume yo" (娘よ, Girl)	—	—	Fujioka Fujimaki I
2007	"Oyaji no Kokoro ni Tomotta Chiisana Hi" (オヤジの心に灯った小さな火, A Little Light that Burnt in the Old Man's Heart) (Mai Satoda with Fujioka Fujimaki)	116	1,100	Fujioka Fujimaki III
2007	"Gake no Ue no Ponyo" (崖の上のポニョ, Ponyo Above the Cliff) (Fujioka Fujimaki and Nozomi Ōhashi)	3	382,000	Gake no Ue no Ponyo Image Album

=== Other appearances ===
Release	Artist	Title	Notes	Album
2007	AA-Chino	"Hayaku Koikoi Wrecker-sha" (早く来い来いレッカー車, Quickly Come Come Wrecking Truck)	Wrote song.	"Mighty Body" (single)
2008	Fujioka Fujimaki	"Fujimoto no Theme" (フジモトのテーマ, Fujimoto's Theme)		Gake no Ue no Ponyo Image Album
2008	Fujioka Fujimaki	"Hontō no Kimochi" (本当の気持ち, Real Feelings)		Gake no Ue no Ponyo Image Album
