= Gake no Ue no Ponyo (song) =

2007 single by Fujioka Fujimaki and Nozomi Ōhashi

Single by Fujioka Fujimaki and Nozomi Ōhashi

from the album Ponyo soundtrack
- B-side: "Fujimoto no Theme"
- Released: December 5, 2007
- Genre: J-pop, folk
- Length: 2:44
- Label: Yamaha Music Communications
- Songwriters: Katsuya Kondō, Hayao Miyazaki, Joe Hisaishi
- Producer: Joe Hisaishi

Fujioka Fujimaki singles chronology
"Oyaji no Kokoro ni Tomotta Chiisa na Hi" (2007)	"Gake no Ue no Ponyo" (2007)	"Zoku Oyaji no Kokoro ni Tomotta Chiisa na Hi" (2010)

Nozomi Ōhashi singles chronology
"Gake no Ue no Ponyo" (2007)	"Panda no Yume" (2011)

"Gake no Ue no Ponyo" (崖の上のポニョ; "Ponyo on the Cliff") is the theme song to the Studio Ghibli film Ponyo, released on December 5, 2007 (though gaining popularity with the release of the film in August 2008). It was performed by folk group Fujioka Fujimaki and then eight-year-old Nozomi Ōhashi.

== Writing ==
The song was written in collaboration between veteran Ghibli composer Joe Hisaishi, with lyrics by the film's supervisor Katsuya Kondō and director Hayao Miyazaki. When Hisaishi originally saw the storyboards for the film, he immediately thought up the melody for the song. However, as he believed it was too simple a melody, he did not mention it for two to three months. He eventually showed the song to Miyazaki and producer Toshio Suzuki as he could not get it out of his head. They both believed such a simple song was fitting for the film.

== Promotion ==
Other than being promoted in commercials and in the film Ponyo, the song was used in commercials for Mitsuya Cider. Fujioka Fujimaki and Nozomi Ōhashi performed the song on the new year's song contest Kōhaku Uta Gassen, making Ōhashi the youngest participant after 59 years of airing.

== Chart reception ==
The song was an extremely successful long-seller on Oricon's physical single charts. The song initially only charted for one week at #115 after its initial release in December 2007. It began charting again lowly in below the 100 mark at the beginning of July, and broke into the top ten at #6 by the end of July. The song then spent 11 weeks in the top 10, peaking at #3 for four weeks. The song charted in the top 50 for 15 further weeks (breaking into the top 20 around new years, due to Kōhaku Uta Gassen), and finally stopped charting in the top 200 August 2009, spending more than an entire year on the charts.

On the Billboard Japan Hot 100 (combined physical sales and airplay), the song peaked at #4, and was the 17th most successful song in 2008. Digitally, the song peaked at #1 on RIAJ's monthly ringtone chart, and has been certified platinum for full-length cellphone downloads and double-platinum for ringtone downloads.

== Track listing ==
No.	Title	Lyrics	Music	Length
1.	"Gake no Ue no Ponyo" (崖の上のポニョ "Ponyo on the Cliff")	Katsuya Kondō, Hayao Miyazaki	Joe Hisaishi	2:44
2.	"Fujimoto no Theme" (フジモトのテーマ "Fujimoto's Theme" performed by Fujioka Fujimaki)	Fujioka Fujimaki	Hisaishi	3:28
3.	"Gake no Ue no Ponyo (Karaoke)"	Kondō, Miyazaki	Hisaishi	2:44
4.	"Fujimoto no Theme (Karaoke)"	Fujioka Fujimaki	Hisaishi	3:28
5.	"Gake no Ue no Ponyo (Nozomi-chan Demo)" (のぞみちゃんデモ "Nozomi's Demo Take" performed by Nozomi Ōhashi)	Kondō, Miyazaki	Hisaishi	2:30
Total length:				14:54

== Chart positions ==
Chart	Peak position
Oricon daily singles	1
Oricon weekly singles	3
Oricon yearly singles	14
Billboard Japan Hot 100	4
Billboard Japan Hot 100 yearly charts	17
RIAJ Reco-kyō monthly ringtone chart	1

== Certifications ==
Chart	Amount
Oricon physical sales	382,000
RIAJ ringtone downloads	500,000+
RIAJ full-length cellphone downloads	250,000+

== English version ==
"Ponyo on the Cliff by the Sea"

Single by Noah Cyrus and Frankie Jonas
- Released: May 4, 2010
- Genre: Pop, pop rock
- Length: 2:44
- Label: Walt Disney Records
- Songwriters: Katsuya Kondō, Hayao Miyazaki & Joe Hisaishi

Noah Cyrus singles chronology
"Ponyo on the Cliff by the Sea" (2010)	"Make Me (Cry)" (2016)

Frankie Jonas singles chronology
"Ponyo on the Cliff by the Sea" (2010)	"Cocaine" (2023)

For the overseas release of the film, an English version retitled as "Ponyo on the Cliff by the Sea" was released, sung by Noah Cyrus and Frankie Jonas (siblings of Disney teen stars Miley Cyrus and the Jonas Brothers). The song was released as a digital download in May 2010, despite the film being released in North America in August 2009.

Two versions of this cover were created: one, a direct stylistic cover of the original version, and another upbeat pop rock remix of the song.

=== Track listing ===
No.	Title	Length
1.	"Ponyo on the Cliff by the Sea"	2:44
2.	"Ponyo on the Cliff by the Sea" (remix)	3:02
Total length:		5:46

== Other versions ==
- Joe Hisaishi (2009, self cover performed on piano, album Another Piano Stories: The End of the World)
- Nana Hiwatari (2008, compilation album Ghibli the Best)
- Yūko Kanzaki & Kentarō Hayami, (2009, compilation album Kodomo no Uta: Gake no Ue no Ponyo Hi wa, Mata Noboru)
- Meja (2010, album AniMeja: Ghibli Songs)
- Takashi Obara (2009, performed on piano on album Ghibli in Classic: Gake no Ue no Ponyo, Tonari no Totoro)
- Sumi Shimamoto (2009, album Sumi Shimamoto Sings Ghibli)
- Yumiko Tamura, Takashi Irie (2009, compilation album Kazoku Minna no Family Song: Fāmi Son Gake no Ue no Ponyo)
- Kenji Yamahira, Keiichi Hosokawa (2008, performed on erhu, album Erhu Chūgoku Dentō Gakki de Kiku Studio Ghibli Sakuhinshū Best Selection)
