= Nozomi Ōhashi =

Retired Japanese child actress

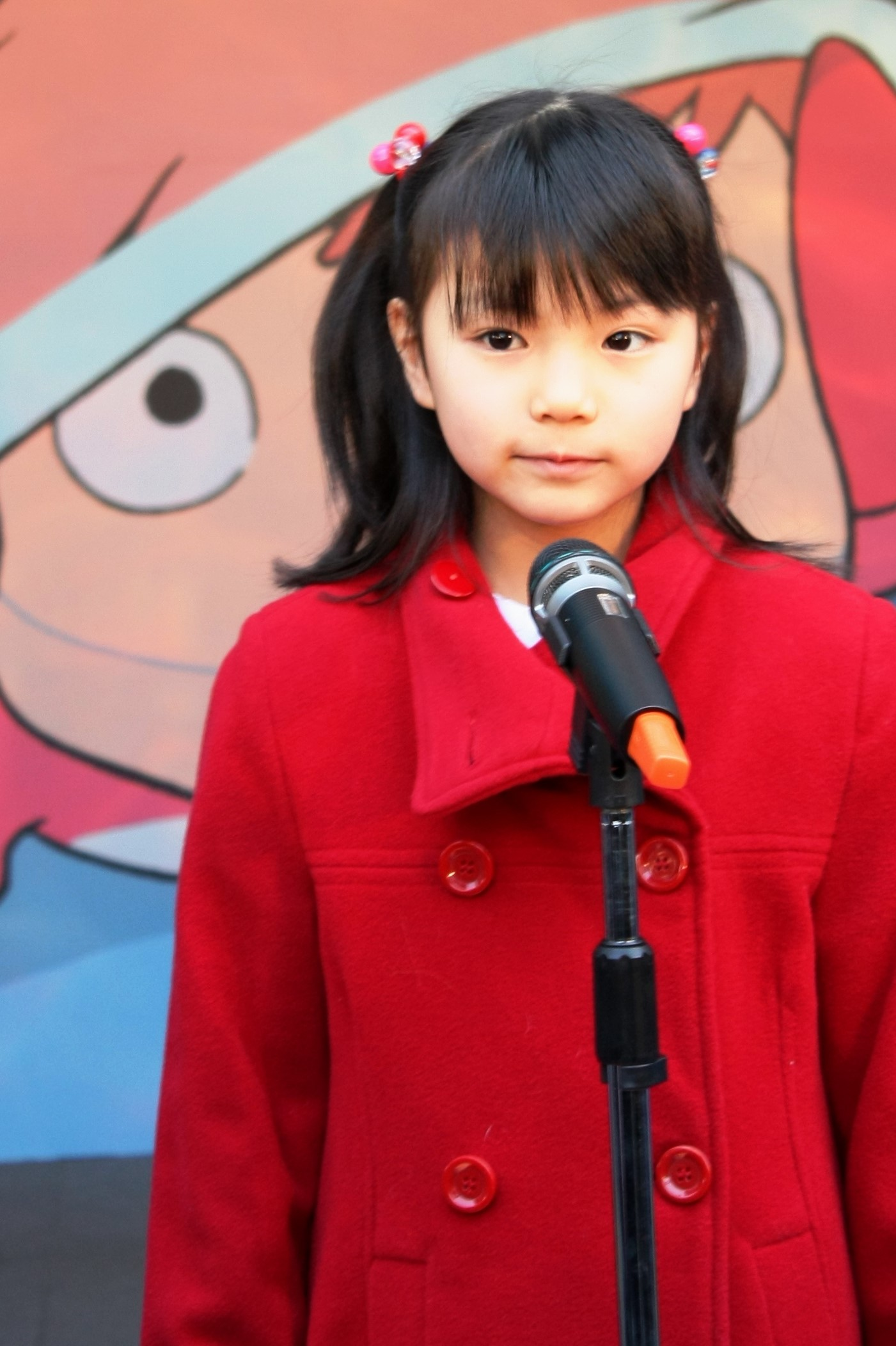
- Nozomi Ōhashi in January 2009
- Born: May 9, 1999 (age 27); Tokyo, Japan
- Other name: Non-chan
- Occupations: Child actress, singer
- Years active: 2002–2012
- Notable work: Shiroi Haru; The Quiz Show; Ponyo; Detective Conan: The Lost Ship in the Sky
- Website: Official profile

Nozomi Ōhashi (大橋 のぞみ, Ōhashi Nozomi; born May 9, 1999) is a Japanese former child actress and singer attached to the Central Kodomo Gekidan talent agency. She is noted for her role in the 2008 Studio Ghibli film Ponyo. Nozomi has also starred in various Japanese television series.

Ōhashi retired from acting in 2012.

== Career ==
Ohashi made her acting debut at the age of three, and debuted as a singer with the song "Gake no Ue no Ponyo", which she sang together with the duo group Fujioka Fujimaki in 2007. "Gake no Ue no Ponyo" is the theme song of the 2008 Studio Ghibli anime film Ponyo.

When this single was first released on December 15, 2007, it debuted at 115 on the Oricon charts. After the release of Ponyo, however, the single reached the number 3 position on the charts. It remained on the Oricon Top 10 charts for ten consecutive weeks, a record for an artist under the age of 10. This record was only broken by the single "Maru Maru Mori Mori!" in 2011. For singing "Gake no Ue no Ponyo", Ohashi was invited to participate in the 59th edition of Kōhaku Uta Gassen, becoming the youngest participant in the history of this program. In addition to singing the theme song for Ponyo, Ohashi also voiced the character of Karen in this film.

In the 2009 Fuji TV drama Shiroi Haru, Ohashi starred as Sachi Murakami, one of the main characters in this television series. She also played the lead role in a one-off television special drama Happy Birthday. This drama aired on November 21, 2009 on the Fuji TV network.

In 2011, Ohashi released her second single entitled "Panda no Yume". The title track of this single was approved as the "Panda Welcoming Song" for Ueno Zoo by the zoo's publicity committee. It was then used as a publicity song for the new panda exhibit that had opened at the zoo on April 1, 2011. The single was later released in Japan on July 27, 2011. In addition to releasing her single, Ohashi also starred in the television series Don Quixote. She played the role of Airi Nakano in this NTV drama.

Ohashi played a minor role in the film Shiawase no Pan, which was released in Japanese cinemas on January 28, 2012.

On March 1, 2012, it was announced that Ōhashi would be retiring from show business to concentrate on her studies after entering junior high school. Ōhashi's last day in show business was on March 31, 2012. It was also announced that the film that Nozomi was supposed to star in, Daisuki na Kutsu o Haitara, had been cancelled due to production problems.

She starred in the television program Jinsei ga Kawaru 1-Funkan no Fukaihanashi on March 19, 2012. During this program, she sang the songs "Gake no Ue no Ponyo" and "Kyo no Hi wa Sayonara", both of which were featured in her album Non-chan Kumo ni Noru. This was her last public appearance before her retirement from show business.

== Personal life ==
Nozomi Ōhashi is the youngest child in her family. She has two sisters who are respectively 7 and 4 years her elder. Her favorite actress is Mirai Shida.

== Television dramas ==
- Ningen no Shomei (CX, 2004)
- Yonimo Kimyona Monogatari Anata no Monogatari (Fuji TV, 2005)
- Kinyo Entertainment (Fuji TV, 2006)
- Tsubasa no Oreta Tenshitachi Slot (Fuji TV, 2006)
- Juken Sentai Gekiranger (TV Asahi, 2007, ep1)
- Honto ni Atta Kowai Hanashi Tsukareta Mori (Fuji TV, 2009)
- Shiroi Haru (Fuji TV, 2009)
- The Quiz Show 2 (NTV, 2009)
- Veterinarian Dolittle (TBS, 2010)
- Don Quixote (NTV, 2011)

=== Film ===
- Inu no Eiga (2005) as the young Mika
- Luna-Heights (2005) as Anna Kishibe
- Luna-Heights 2 (2006) as Anna Kishibe
- Ponyo on the Cliff by the Sea (2008) as the voice of Karen
- A Happy Birthday (2009) as Asuka Fujiwara
- Cheburashka (2010) as the voice of Cheburashka
- Detective Conan: The Lost Ship in the Sky (2010) as the voice of Satoshi Kawaguchi

=== Commercials ===
- Asahi Soft Drinks Mitsuya Cider (2008) - appearing with Fujioka Fujimaki

== Discography ==
=== Singles ===
- "Gake no Ue no Ponyo" (5 December 2007, Yamaha Music Communications) - alongside Fujioka Fujimaki
- "Panda no Yume" (27 July 2011)

=== Albums ===
- Ponyo on the Cliff by the Sea Image Album "Ponyo's Lullaby"
- Non-chan Kumo ni Noru (24 December 2008, Yamaha Music Communications)
