= Exile Tribe Revolution =

Studio album by Exile Tribe
- Released: August 27, 2014

Exile Tribe Revolution (styled EXILE TRIBE REVOLUTION) is an album by Japanese group Exile Tribe. It was released on August 27, 2014. It reached number one on the weekly Oricon Albums Chart. It was the eighth best-selling album of the year in Japan, with 333,998 copies sold.
