= The Best/Blue Impact =

Studio album by Sandaime J Soul Brothers from Exile Tribe
- Released: January 1, 2014

Sandaime J Soul Brothers from Exile Tribe chronology
Miracle (2013)	The Best/Blue Impact (2014)	Planet Seven (2015)

The Best/Blue Impact (styled THE BEST/BLUE IMPACT) is an album by Japanese group Sandaime J Soul Brothers from Exile Tribe. It was released on January 1, 2014. It reached the number-one place on the weekly Oricon Albums Chart and stayed at number-one for four weeks. It was the 4th best-selling album in the first half of the year in Japan, with 323,798 copies and it was the 6th best-selling album of the year in Japan, with 347,363 copies.
