= Yes We Are =

Single by Sandaime J Soul Brothers
- Language: Japanese
- B-side: "Raise The Flag"; "Fire"; "Hanauta, Flowers for you"
- Released: March 13, 2019
- Genre: J-pop
- Length: 4:16
- Label: Rhythm Zone
- Producer(s): EXILE HIRO

Sandaime J Soul Brothers singles chronology
"J.S.B Happiness" (2017)	"Yes We Are" (2019)	"SCARLET" (2019)

Music video
- "Yes we are" on YouTube "Raise The Flag" on YouTube

"Yes We Are" is the 23rd single by Sandaime J Soul Brothers. It was released on March 13, 2019.

== Background ==
"Yes we are" was the first single released by Sandaime J Soul Brothers in 2019. The single marked the first release by the group after a year and four months since their last release "J.S.B Happiness". The single peaked at number two on the Oricon Weekly Charts with 93,660 points. By the end of the year the single had scored a total of 226,173 points. The EP's 1st track "Raise The Flag" was used as the official theme of the group's eponymous tour "Raise The Flag".

== Track listing ==
No.	Title	Length
1.	"Raise the Flag"	5:39
2.	"Yes We Are"	4:16
3.	"Fire"	3:36
4.	""Hanauta ~Flowers for you~ (花歌 ～Flowers for you～, "Flower Song ~Flowers for you~")"	4:24
Total length:		17:55

== Charts ==
Chart (2019)	Peak position
Japan (Japan Hot 100)	2
Japan (Oricon)	2

== Certifications ==
Region	Certification	Certified units/sales
Japan (RIAJ)	Gold	100,000^{^}
^{^} Shipments figures based on certification alone.
