= Miyu Honda =

Japanese actress and figure skater (born 2004)

- 本田 望結
- Born: June 1, 2004 (age 22); Fushimi-ku, Kyoto, Japan
- Occupations: Actress; tarento; figure skater
- Years active: 2009–present
- Agent: Oscar Promotion
- Known for: I'm Mita, Your Housekeeper.
- Relatives: Taichi Honda; Marin Honda

Miyu Honda (本田 望結, Honda Miyu; born June 1, 2004) is a Japanese actress, tarento and figure skater from Kyoto Prefecture. She is represented by Oscar Promotion, having previously been represented by Theatre Academy.

== Career ==
Miyu Honda made her debut in the entertainment world in 2010, when she starred in an advertisement for Pizza Hut. She also played minor roles in several Japanese television dramas like Wataru Seken wa Oni Bakari (2011, TBS), Ikemen desu ne (2011, TBS) and Marumo no Okite (2011, CX). She was also featured in the 2011 film Gantz: Perfect Answer in her debut film role.

However, Miyu Honda only rose to prominence after starring in the 2011 Nippon Television television drama I'm Mita, Your Housekeeper.. She played the role of Kii Asuda in this popular drama, which garnered an average viewership rating of 25.2%, the highest for any television drama in 2011. She has been compared to Mana Ashida, another child actress who was the lead star in Marumo no Okite, for her role in this drama.

In 2012, Miyu starred in the television drama Kodomo Keisatsu, in which she plays the role of Maiko Hayashi alongside Fuku Suzuki, another child actor who at the time was from the same agency. She was also featured in the drama Summer Rescue, where she plays the role of Momoka Hirahara, the daughter of a veteran nurse (played by actress Eiko Koike). In 2018, she voiced both of the titular characters in the anime film Liz and the Blue Bird by Kyoto Animation.

In addition to television dramas, Miyu has also been featured in the music video of the song Futari Hitotsu by singer-songwriter Rake. She was also featured in 14th Tokyo Girls Collection Spring/Summer Collection 2012 as a fashion model.

From July 2013 she switched her talent agency changed to Oscar Promotion.

In the spring of 2023, Honda and her sister, Marin, were cast to in the summer figure skating show, One Piece on Ice, with Honda being cast to play Nami and Marin being cast to play Nefeltari Vivi.

== Personal life ==
Honda is the fourth of five children in her family. She started to learn ice hockey when she was three years old, and formally took up figure skating when she was four years old. She attributed her interest to her eldest brother, Taichi Honda, who is also a figure skater. Her older sister, Marin, is the 2016 World Junior Champion. In a figure skating competition organized by Kansai University in 2011, Miyu achieved the first position in the 3rd grader category.

== Filmography ==
=== Television dramas ===
- Wataru Seken wa Oni Bakari (2011), Mari
- Sayonara Bokutachi no Youchien (2011), Mikoto Mochida
- Marumo no Okite (2011, episode 3–10), Manami Endo
- Ikemen desu ne (2011, episode 1)
- I'm Mita, Your Housekeeper. (2011), Kii Asuda
- Kodomo Keisatsu (2012), Maiko Hayashi
- Summer Rescue (2012), Momoka Hirahara
- Kodomo Keishi (2013)
- Jui-san Jikendesuyo (2014, ep1,5), Aoi Asano
- Keibuho Sugiyama Shintaro (2015), Miharu Sugiyama
- The Supporting Actors 2 (2018), herself
- The Supporting Actors 3 (2021), herself
- Boy's Abyss (2022), Sakuko Akiyama
- Ranman (2023,), Chizuru Makino
- Futari Solo Camp (2024), Shizuku Kusano

=== Films ===
- Gantz: Perfect Answer (2011)
- Yellow Elephant (2012)
- The Letters (2015), Chiaki Hoshino
- Nagasaki: Memories of My Son (2015), Tamiko
- Kisaragi Station (2022), Asuka Miyazaki
- Go! Go! Sakura Club (2023), Nanami Shimada
- Curling Dream (2024), Kasumi Shimizu
- Re: Kisaragi Station (2025), Asuka Miyazaki
- Love Doesn't Matter to Me (2025), Akua Kimura
- The High School Family (2027), Kotone Akai

=== Dubbing ===
- The BFG (2016), Sophie (Ruby Barnhill)
