= List of Jewelpet soundtracks =

This article lists the albums attributed to the anime series Jewelpet.

== Singles ==
=== "Maji? Maji! Magical☆Jewel" ===
"Maji? Maji! Magical Jewel"

Single by Yui Asaka and Horie Mitsuko

from the album Jewelpet: Happy Music
- B-side: "The Smile's Loop"
- Released: May 20, 2009
- Genre: Single; J-pop
- Label: Columbia Music Entertainment

"Maji? Maji! Magical Jewel" (マジ？マジ! マジカル☆ジュエル, Maji? Maji! Majikaru☆Jueru; lit. 'Really? Seriously! Magical☆Jewel') is the single by Yui Asaka and Horie Mitsuko which was used as the opening and ending themes to the anime Jewelpet. It was released on May 20, 2009, by Columbia Music Entertainment.

Track listing

All music is composed by Yuriko Mori.

| No. | Title | Length |
|---|---|---|
| 1. | "Maji? Maji! Magical Jewel" (マジ？マジ! マジカル☆ジュエル) | 4:07 |
| 2. | "Egao no Loop" (笑顔のループ Egao no Rūpu, "The Smile Loop") | 4:16 |
| 3. | "Maji? Maji! Magical Jewel" (Karaoke) | 4:07 |
| 4. | "Egao no Loop" (Karaoke) | 4:15 |

=== "Happy Twinkle/Sora ni Rakugaki" ===
"Happy Twinkle/Sora ni Rakugaki"

Single by Kayano Masuyama, Ayaka Saito, Miyuki Sawashiro, Natsumi Takamori, Ayana Taketatsu and Azusa Kataoka

from the album Jewelpet Twinkle: Happy Happy Music
- A-side: "Happy☆Twinkle"
- B-side: "Scribbling at the Sky"
- Released: June 23, 2010
- Genre: Single; J-pop
- Label: Columbia Music Entertainment

"Happy Twinkle/Sora ni Rakugaki" (Happy☆てぃんくる/空ニラクガキ, Hapii☆Tinkeru/Sora ni Rakugaki; lit. 'Happy Twinkle/Scribbling at the Sky') is the single by Kayano Masuyama, Ayaka Saito, Miyuki Sawashiro, Natsumi Takamori, Ayana Taketatsu and Azusa Kataoka which was used as the opening and ending themes to the anime Jewelpet Twinkle. It is released on June 23, 2010, by Columbia Music Entertainment.

CD Track listing

All music is composed by Takafumi Iwasaki of Project.R and Takahiro Matsumoto.

| No. | Title | Length |
|---|---|---|
| 1. | "Happy Twinkle" (Happy☆てぃんくる) | 3:43 |
| 2. | "Sora ni Rakugaki" (空ニラクガキ) | 3:56 |
| 3. | "Happy Twinkle" (Karaoke) | 3:44 |
| 4. | "Sora ni Rakugaki" (Karaoke) | 3:55 |

=== "Go! Go! Sunshine/Imadoki Otome" ===
"Go! Go! Sunshine/Imadoki Otome"

Single by Mayumi Gojo, Kayano Masuyama and Misuzu Mochizuki

from the album Jewelpet Sunshine: Happyx3 Music
- A-side: "GO! GO! Sunshine"
- B-side: "Nowadays girl"
- Released: June 22, 2011
- Genre: Single; J-pop
- Label: Columbia Music Entertainment

"Go! Go! Sunshine/Imadoki Otome" (GO! GO! サンシャイン/イマドキ乙女, GO! GO! Sanshain/Imadoki Otome) is the single by Mayumi Gojo, Kayano Masuyama and Misuzu Mochizuki which was used as the opening and ending themes to the anime Jewelpet Sunshine. It is released on June 22, 2011, by Columbia Music Entertainment. The CD+DVD Edition includes a limited edition pen.

Track listing

All music is composed by Takafumi Iwasaki and Noriyuki Asakura.

| No. | Title | Length |
|---|---|---|
| 1. | "Go! Go! Sunshine" (GO! GO! サンシャイン Gō! Gō! Sanshain) | 3:48 |
| 2. | "Imadoki Otome" (イマドキ乙女, "Nowadays Girl") | 3:53 |
| 3. | "Go! Go! Sunshine" (Karaoke) | 3:48 |
| 4. | "Imadoki Otome" (Karaoke) | 3:51 |

== Albums ==
=== Jewelpet: Happy Music ===
Jewelpet: Happy Music

Soundtrack album by Shiro Hamaguchi and Takuya Hiramitsu
- Released: April 21, 2010
- Recorded: 2009
- Genre: Anime soundtrack
- Label: Columbia Music Entertainment

Jewelpet: Happy Music (ジュエルペット はっぴぃ♪ミュージック) is the official soundtrack album of the anime series Jewelpet released on April 21, 2010, by Columbia Music Entertainment It contains TV versions of both the opening and ending themes of the series and including the character song of Luna, Milky and Peridot performed by Rumi Shishido, Keiko Utsumi and Yuki Kaida.

Track listing

1. "Really? Seriously! Magical Jewel (TV Version)" (マジ？マジ! マジカル☆ジュエル (TVサイズ))
2. "Jewel Land hi" (ジュエルランドへ, Jewel Land hi)
3. "Zenkai no Osarai (前回のおさらい))
4. "Ruby" (ルビー)
5. "Pet-tachi" (ペットたち)
6. "Mahou Gakkou" (魔法学校)
7. "Majo Tachi" (魔女たち)
8. "Nichijou A" (日常A)
9. "Nichijou B" (日常B)
10. "Nichijou C" (日常C)
11. "Nichijou D" (日常D)
12. "Diana" (ダイアナ)
13. "Kaito Herb Dan A" (怪盗ハーブ団A)
14. "Kaito Herb Dan B" (怪盗ハーブ団B)
15. "Panic A" (パニックA)
16. "Panic B" (パニックB)
17. "Souri Kantei" (総理官邸)
18. "Sentimental A" (センチメンタルA)
19. "Sentimental B" (センチメンタルB)
20. "Kanashimi A" (悲しみA)
21. "Kanashimi B" (悲しみB)
22. "Yuuki Wo Dashite" (勇気を出して)
23. "Dian Maho" (ディアン魔法)
24. "Dian A" (ディアンA)
25. "Dian B" (ディアンB)
26. "Dian C" (ディアンC)
27. "Suspense" (サスペンス)
28. "Judge Kun no Merry Go Round" (ジャッジ君のメリーゴーランド)
29. "Jewel Game A" (ジュエルゲームA)
30. "Jewel Game B" (ジュエルゲームB)
31. "Jewel Game C" (ジュエルゲームC)
32. "Jewel Game D" (ジュエルゲームD)
33. "Warui Yokan" (悪い予感)
34. "Fushigi" (不思議)
35. "Comical A" (コミカルA)
36. "Comical B" (コミカルB)
37. "Comical Suspense A" (コミカルサスペンスA)
38. "Comical Suspense B" (コミカルサスペンスB)
39. "Tokimeki" (トキメキ)
40. "Battle Theme A" (バトルテーマA)
41. "Battle Theme B" (バトルテーマB)
42. "Yume Miru Onnanoko" (夢見る女の子)
43. "Doki Doki" (ドキドキ)
44. "Yuuga na Hitotoki" (優雅なひととき)
45. "Saishuu Battle" (最終バトル)
46. "Katsuyaku" (活躍)
47. "Chikara no Awasete" (力を合わせて)
48. "Happy End" (ハッピーエンド)
49. "Ruby Hakase no Jewelpet Shoukai" (ルビー博士のジュエルペット紹介)
50. "Strawberry Time -album version-" (ストロベリータイム -album version-)
51. "The Smile's Loop" (TV Version) (笑顔のループ (TVサイズ))

=== Jewelpet Twinkle☆: Happy Happy Music ===
Jewelpet Twinkle☆: Happy Happy Music

Soundtrack album by Shiro Hamaguchi and Yoshikazu Iwanami
- Released: August 29, 2010
- Genre: Anime soundtrack
- Label: Columbia Music Entertainment

Jewelpet Twinkle☆: Happy Happy Music (ジュエルペット てぃんくる☆ はっぴぃ☆はっぴぃミュージック) is the official soundtrack album of the anime series Jewelpet Twinkle☆, released on August 29, 2010, by Columbia Music Entertainment. Like Jewelpet: Happy Music, the soundtrack also contains TV versions of both the opening and ending themes of the series.

Track listing

1. "Hitomi Ha Jueru☆" (瞳はジュエル☆)
2. "Happy Twinkle" (TV Version) (Happy☆てぃんくる (テレビサイズ))
3. "Ruby no Theme" (ルビーのテーマ)
4. "Jewel Land he Let's Go!" (ジュエルランドへレッツ・ゴー!)
5. "Subtitle" (サブタイトル)
6. "Mahou no Gakkou de Doki☆Doki" (魔法の学校でドッキ☆ドキ)
7. "Tadaima Shiken Chuu" (ただいま試験中)
8. "Akari no Koigokoro" (あかりの恋心)
9. "Yuujou no Tsubomi" (友情のつぼみ)
10. "Ai to Yuuki no Jewel Flash!" (愛と勇気のジュエルフラッシュ!)
11. "Yume no Partner" (夢のパートナー)
12. "Mahou no Kuni Jewel Land" (魔法の国ジュエルランド)
13. "Gakkou he Ikou!" (学校へ行こう!)
14. "Leon no Theme" (レオンのテーマ)
15. "Miria no Theme" (ミリアのテーマ)
16. "Twinkle Twinkle☆ -Light Magic-" (てぃんくるてぃんくる☆-Light Magic-)
17. "Twinkle Twinkle☆" (てぃんくるてぃんくる☆)
18. "Ijiwaru Na Mahoutsukai" (いじわるな魔法使い)
19. "Ayashii Jiken" (あやしい実験)
20. "Sara no Theme" (沙羅のテーマ)
21. "Twinkle Twinkle☆ -Strong Magic-" (てぃんくるてぃんくる☆-Strong Magic-)
22. "Abunai Mahou No Tsukurikata" (あぶない魔法の作り方)
23. "Bousou" (暴走)
24. "Sunao ni Narenakute" (素直になれなくて)
25. "Toozakaru yuma" (遠ざかる夢)
26. "Ruby no Kanashimi" (ルビーの悲しみ)
27. "Eyecatch☆A" (アイキャッチ☆A)
28. "Eyecatch☆B" (アイキャッチ☆B)
29. "Joou Jewelina" (女王ジュエリーナ)
30. "Kirameku Jewel Stone" (きらめくジュエルストーン)
31. "Mittsu no Negai" (三つの願い)
32. "Yume no Kanaeru Peridot" (夢をかなえるペリドット)
33. "Ruby no Koukishin" (ルビーの好奇心)
34. "Mata Yacchata" (またやっちゃった)
35. "Sekai ha Mahou de Ippai" (世界は魔法でいっぱい)
36. "Tadaima Jugyou Chuu" (ただいま授業中)
37. "Tensai Nicolas" (天才ニコラ)
38. "Alma no Theme" (アルマのテーマ)
39. "Massugu Na Kimochi De" (まっすぐな気持ちで)
40. "Moshuikashite Yabai Kamo" (もしかしてやばいかも)
41. "Tottemo Pinch" (とってもピンチ!)
42. "Zettai Zetsumei" (絶体絶命!)
43. "Leon no Katsyaku" (レオンの活躍)
44. "Doki☆Doki☆Jewel Land no Himitsu" (ドッキ☆ドキ☆ジュエルランドのひみつ)
45. "Mahou no Jikan ga Hajimaru yo" (魔法の時間が始まるよ)
46. "Yoru no Jewel Land" (夜のジュエルランド)
47. "Akari no Yume" (あかりの夢)
48. "Setsunai Omoi" (切ない想い)
49. "Yume o Mamoritai" (夢を守りたい)
50. "Hontou no Mahou" (ほんとうの魔法)
51. "Mirai he" (未来へ)
52. "Sora no Rakugaki" (TV Version) (空ニラクガキ (テレビサイズ))

=== Jewelpet: Kirapika☆Song ===
Jewelpet: Kirapika☆Song

Soundtrack album by Various Artists
- Released: December 1, 2010
- Genre: Anime soundtrack
- Label: Columbia Music Entertainment

Jewelpet: Kirapika☆Song (ジュエルペット きらぴか☆ソング) is the compilation soundtrack album of both the anime series Jewelpet and Jewelpet Twinkle, released on December 1, 2010, by Columbia Music Entertainment. The album contains the theme songs and insert songs of both series as well as new ones from the Sanrio Puroland Events and musicals.

Track listing

1. "Happy Twinkle" (Happy☆てぃんくる) (Kayano Masuyama feat. Ruby and Labra)
2. "Really? Seriously! Magical Jewel" (マジ？マジ! マジカル☆ジュエル) (Yui Asaka)
3. "Strawberry Time" (ストロベリータイム) (Luna, Milky and Peridot)
4. "Little☆Twinkle☆Star" (Little☆てぃんくる☆Star) (Miria)
5. "Listen to Me Lesson For You" (リッスントゥーミー レッスンフォーユー) (Ruby)) (From the Sanrio Puroland Event "Magical March")
6. "Everyone is a Teacher" (みんなが先生, Minna ga Sensei) (Ruby) (From the Sanrio Puroland Event "Magical March")
7. "Magical☆Twist" (マジカル☆ツイスト) (Ruby) (From the Sanrio Puroland Event "Magical March")
8. "Theme of JP" (JPのテーマ) (Ruby, Labra and Sapphy) (From the Sanrio Puroland Event "Jewelpet and Cinnamon: Future Revolution")
9. "Treasure (宝物, Takaramono) (Ruby, Labra and Sapphy) (From the Sanrio Puroland Event "Jewelpet and Cinnamon: Future Revolution")
10. "The Future is Sparkly (みらいはキラキラ, Mirai wa Kirakira) (Ruby, Labra and Sapphy) (From the Sanrio Puroland Event "Jewelpet and Cinnamon: Future Revolution")
11. "Scribbling at the Sky" (空ニラクガキ) (Akari, Miria and Sara)
12. "The Smile's Loop" (笑顔のループ, Egao no Loop) (Horie Mitsuko)

=== Jewelpet Sunshine: Happyx3 Music ===
Jewelpet Sunshine: Happyx3 Music

Soundtrack album by Shiro Hamaguchi and Yoshikazu Iwanami
- Released: July 20, 2011
- Genre: Anime soundtrack
- Label: Columbia Music Entertainment

Jewelpet Sunshine: Happyx3 Music (ジュエルペット サンシャイン はっぴぃ×3ミュージック) (Spelled as "Happy Happy Happy") is the official soundtrack album of the anime series Jewelpet Sunshine released on July 20, 2011, by Columbia Music Entertainment. It contains TV versions of both the opening and ending themes of the series.

Track listing

1. "Jewelpet Sunshine no Theme" (ジュエルペットサンシャインのテーマ)
2. "Go! Go! Sunshine (Tv Size)" (GO!GO! サンシャイン (TVサイズ)) (Mayumi Gojo)
3. "Hoseki no Kuni Jewel Land" (宝石の国ジュエルランド)
4. "Subtitle" (サブタイトル)
5. "Sunshine Gakuen" (サンシャイン学園)
6. "Ruby no Nakama Tachi" (ルビーと仲間たち)
7. "Kanon no Theme" (花音のテーマ)
8. "Iruka Sensei Ga Yattekita" (イルカ先生がやってきた)
9. "Miracle Charm☆Jewel Flash" (ミラクルチャーム☆ジュエルフラッシュ)
10. "3 Nen Ume Gumi Ochikobore Gumi" (3年ウメ組おちこぼれ組)
11. "Okiraru De Ikou Yeah!" (お気楽で行こうイェイッ!)
12. "Kanon no Koigokoro" (花音の恋心)
13. "Tayutau Omoi" (たゆたう想い)
14. "Ruby no Yasashisa" (ルビーのやさしさ)
15. "Labra and Angela" (ラブラとエンジェラ)
16. "High Tension de Yeah!" (ハイテンションでイェイッ!)
17. "Peridot and Hinata" (ペリドットとひなた)
18. "Peridot Jewel Flash" (ペリドット☆ジュエルフラッシュ!)
19. "Aozora No Message" (青空のメッセージ)
20. "Gakuen Seikatsu" (学園生活)
21. "Oshare na Garnet" (おしゃれなガーネット)
22. "Akogare no Diana" (あこがれのダイアナ)
23. "Ano ko ha Ninkimono" (あの子は人気者)
24. "Garnet Jewel Flash" (ガーネット☆ジュエルフラッシュ!)
25. "Jewel Land no Kyuujitsu" (ジュエルランドの休日)
26. "Nonbiri Datsyryoku Kei" (のんびり脱力系)
27. "Yukaina Nakama" (ゆかいな仲間)
28. "Ikemen Gumi Toujou" (イケメン組登場)
29. "Honokana Kou" (ほのかな恋)
30. "Waniyama no Theme" (ワニ山のテーマ)
31. "Nejikawa no Theme" (ネジ川のテーマ)
32. "Nazo Wo Ou Ruby" (謎を追うルビー)
33. "Shouko no Theme" (晶子のテーマ)
34. "Speed Shoubu" (スピード勝負!)
35. "Yuujou no Jewel" (友情のジュエル)
36. "Yuuhi no Mukatte Yeah!" (夕日に向かってイェイッ!)
37. "Hoshizora no Jewelina" (星空のジュエリーナ)
38. "Komatta Roommate" (困ったルームメイト)
39. "Yabai Tenkai!?" (ヤバイ展開!?)
40. "Dai Pinch" (大ピンチ)
41. "Chikara o Awasete" (力を合わせて)
42. "Pure ne Heart De" (ピュアなハートで)
43. "Koi ha Mahou" (恋は魔法)
44. "Sunshine na Hibi" (サンシャインな日々)
45. "Kanon no Kimochi" (花音のキモチ)
46. "Yume o Oikakete" (夢を追いかけて)
47. "Asu mo DokiDoki Dayo Yeah!" (明日もドキドキだよイェイッ)
48. "Nowadays Girl (TV Size)" (イマドキ乙女 (TVサイズ)) (Kayano Masuyama and Misuzu Mochizuki)

=== Jewelpet The Movie: Sweets Dance Princess Soundtrack ===
Jewelpet The Movie: Sweets Dance Princess Soundtrack

Soundtrack album by Mana Ashida and Wataru Maeguchi
- Released: August 8, 2012
- Genre: Anime soundtrack
- Label: Universal Music Japan

Jewelpet the Movie: Sweets Dance Princess Soundtrack (映画ジュエルペット スウィーツダンスプリンセス サウンドトラック, Eiga Juerupetto: Suuītsu Dansu Purinsesu Saundotorakku) is the official soundtrack album of the movie Jewelpet the Movie: Sweets Dance Princess, to be released on August 8, 2012, by Universal Music Japan. It contains the official music from the movie as well as the official opening song, Magic of Dreams.

Track listing

1. "Magic of Dreams" (夢の魔法, Yume no mahō) (Mana Ashida)
2. "Weather Wardrobe" (タンス日和, Tansu biyori)
3. JEWEL FLASH JINGLE
4. "Full Swing Dance Lessons" (ダンスレッスン真っ最中, Dansu ressun massaichū)
5. "I'm Going~!" (行ってきま~す!, Itte kima~su!)
6. "Sweets Waltz" (スウィーツ・ワルツ, Sītsu warutsu)
7. "Sweetsland Castle" (スウィーツランド城, Sūītsurando-jō)
8. "Princess Mana Appears" (マーナ姫登場, Māna hime tōjō)
9. "Practice is a 'NO!'" (習わしだからでは「イヤ!」です, Narawashidakarade wa 'iya!'Desu)
10. "Big Birthday Cake" (でっかいバースデイケーキ, Dekkai bāsudeikēki)
11. "I am The Duke" (僕は公爵さま, Boku wa kōshaku-sama)
12. "Slowly cut the cake" (優雅にケーキカット, Yūga ni kēkikatto)
13. "Suddenly! Strange Pet" (突然! ナゾペット, Totsuzen! Nazopetto)
14. "Sweets Making Sweetspets" (スウィーツ作りならスウィーツペット, Sūītsu-tsukurinara sūītsupetto)
15. "What is it Brûlée?" (ブリュレって言えるかい?, Buryure tte ieru kai?)
16. "Sweetspets and Jewelpets" (スウィーツペットとジュエルペット, Sūītsupetto to juerupetto)
17. "Princess Mana and the Sweetspets" (マーナ姫とスウィーツペット, Māna hime to Sūītsupetto)
18. "I'm Creme Brû!" (生クリームブリュッ!, Nama kurīmuburyu~tsu!)
19. "Have Laughing" (笑っちゃったもっちー, Wara~tsu chatta mo~tsu chī)
20. "Don't Eat" (食べちゃダメだよ, Tabecha dameda yo)
21. "Sweetsland Tourist Information" (スウィーツランド観光案内, Sūītsurando kankō an'nai)
22. "OH! Save us!" (OH! なんてことだー!, OH! Nante kotoda!)
23. "Short Flight in the Magic Broom" (魔法のほうきでひとっ飛び, Mahōnohōki de hitottobi)
24. "You'll get Collected Souvenirs" (おみやげ集めちゃうよ, Omiyage atsume chau yo)
25. "Theme of Amusement" (遊園地のテーマ, Yuenchi no tēma)
26. "Sweets All-you-can eat" (スウィーツ食べ放題, Sūītsu tabehōdai)
27. "Ruby and Park" (ルビーとパクくん, Rubī to pakukun)
28. "The Strange Candy Tower" (ちょっと変だよキャンディータワー, Chotto hendayo kyandītawā)
29. "Come Down Large Chocolate" (でっかいチョコが落ちて来た, Dekkai choko ga ochite kita)
30. "The Legendary Sweetspet Gumimin" (伝説のスウィーツペットグミミン, Densetsu no sūītsupetto Gumimin)
31. "Gumimin Runs Away" (グミミン暴走, Gumimin bōsō)
32. "Sweets Flash" (スウィーツフラッシュ!, Sūītsu Furasshu!)
33. "I, Remembered Gumi" (僕、思い出したグミ, Boku, omoidashita gumi)
34. "Gumimin is Park" (グミミンはパクくんなんだよ, Gumimin wa pakukun'na nda yo)
35. "Friends Forever and Ever (TV Size ~Movie Ver.~)" (ずっとずっとトモダチ (TVサイズ ~映画VER.~), Zutto Zutto Tomodachi (TV saizu ~ eiga VER.~)) (Mana Ashida)
