= Hanazakari no Kimitachi e (2011 TV series) =

Television program

- Also known as: Hanazakari no Kimitachi e: Ikemen Paradise 2011
- Based on: Hana-Kimi by Hisaya Nakajo
- Written by: Chiharu Yamanagi; Ritsuko Hanzawa
- Directed by: Hidetomo Matsuda; Yosuke Goto; Tzusuki Junichi
- Starring: Atsuko Maeda
- Theme music composer: Yasushi Akimoto
- Ending theme: "Flying Get" by AKB48
- Composers: Yū Takami; Shin Kōno
- Country of origin: Japan
- Original language: Japanese
- No. of seasons: 1
- No. of episodes: 11

Production
- Producers: Hiroyuki Goto (Fuji TV); Aya Moriyasu (Kyodo TV)
- Running time: 54 minutes
- Production companies: Fuji Television; Kyodo Television

Original release
- Network: FNS (Fuji TV)
- Release: July 10 – September 18, 2011

Related
- Hanazakarino Kimitachihe; Hanazakari no Kimitachi e (2007); To the Beautiful You

Hanazakari no Kimitachi e: Ikemen Paradise 2011 (Japanese: 花ざかりの君たちへ 〜イケメン☆パラダイス〜 2011, Hepburn: Hanazakari no Kimitachi e: Ikemen Paradaisu 2011) is a 2011 Japanese television series. It is a remake of the 2007 drama series of the same Japanese title which is also based on the manga Hana-Kimi, but it features an entirely new cast.

== Cast ==
=== Second dormitory students ===
- Atsuko Maeda as Mizuki Ashiya
- Shun Oguri as Izumi Sano
- Shohei Miura as Shuichi Nakatsu
- Renn Kiriyama as Minami Nanba
- Tomo Yanagishita as Taiki Kayashima
- Shintaro Yamada as Kyogo Sekime
- Yukito Nishii as Senri Nakao
- Katsuhiro Suzuki as Shinji Noe
- Yuki Kashiwagi as Juri Kishinosato
- Shota Matsushima as Masafumi Katsura
- Shotaro Mamiya as Keisuke Awaji
- Goro Kurihara as Kota Hanaten
- Yuki Sato as Makoto Kagurazaka

=== First dormitory students ===
- Shinnosuke Mitsushima as Megumi Tennoji
- Goki Maeda as Kohei Kitahanada
- Arata Horii as Jin Kumatori
- Ryosuke Yamamoto as Kiyoshikojin Akira
- Ryu Ando as Mukonoso Andrew
- Koudai Asaka as Subaru Takatsuki
- Sonde Kanai as Kazuki Obitoke
- Shotaro Kotani as Hiroto Moriguchi
- Tomoki Okayama as Shōtarō Kadoma

=== Third dormitory students ===
- Hidenori Tokuyama as Oscar M. Himejima/Masao Himejima
- Miyajima Kusuto as Nobuhiro Yaenosato
- Takami Ozora as Sansui Kyobate
- Taiko Katono as Hisashi Kawachimoru
- Kasai Shige as Yasushi Mozu
- Kawahara Kazuma as Sakon Narayama
- Okazaki Kazuhiro as Hideharu Izumigaoka
- Kettaro as Shin Minamikata

=== Others ===
- Saito Takumi as Hokuto Umeda
- Ikkei Watanabe as the chef
- Mirai Yamamoto as Io Nanba

=== Tokyo Gakuen students ===
- Yuki Satō as Makoto Kagurazaka
- Kaname Endō as Otemachi Ryo
- Masaaki Nagakura as Yutaka Takebashi
- Naoki Ōkubo as Jun Tsukishima
- Keisuke Kaminaga as Go Kasai
- Junki Tozuka as Takeshi Kudanshita
- Amane Okayama as Nobuyuki Ochiai

=== St. Blossom's Academy students ===
- Mayuko Iwasa as Hibari Hanayashiki
- Yuki Kashiwagi as Juri Kishinosato
- Miori Ichikawa as Kanna Amagasaki
- Mina Oba as Erika Abeno
- Mariya Nagao as Yumemi Kanbe

=== Guest roles ===
- Mana Ashida as Kaoru Sasakura (Episode 1, cameo)
- Fuku Suzuki as Tomoi Sasakura (Episode 1, cameo)
- Sayuri Iwata as Rika Yamashita (Episode 2)
- Nobuo Kyo (姜 暢雄, Kyō Nobuo) as Masao Himejima (姫島 正夫, Himejima Masao)/Oscar (オスカー, Osuka)) (ep6, cameo)

== Episode list ==
No.	Title	Original release date	Ratings
1	"New Revival!! The Girl who got into a Boys' School"; Transliteration: "Shinsaku de Fukkatsu!! Gakeppuchi Danshikō ni Joshi Ran'nyū" (Japanese: 新作で復活！！崖っぷち男子校に女子乱入)	July 10, 2011	10.1%
2	"Tearful Confession"; Transliteration: "Namida no Kokuhaku" (Japanese: 涙の告白)	July 17, 2011	TBA
3	"The Relay That Connects Our Bond"; Transliteration: "Kizuna o Tsunagu Rirē" (Japanese: 絆をつなぐリレー)	July 24, 2011	TBA
4	"I Like You!!"; Transliteration: "Omae ga Suki da!!" (Japanese: お前が好きだ！！)	July 31, 2011	TBA
5	"Desperate Situation!"; Transliteration: "Zettai Zetsumei" (Japanese: 絶体絶命)	August 7, 2011	TBA
6	"A Sudden Trip"; Transliteration: "Totsuzen no Tabidachi" (Japanese: 突然の旅立ち)	August 14, 2011	TBA
7	"Broken Bond"; Transliteration: "Kowareta Kizuna" (Japanese: 壊れた絆)	August 21, 2011	TBA
8	"One Week Later, the School will be Demolished"; Transliteration: "Isshūkan-go, Gakuen ga Torikowasareru" (Japanese: 一週間後、学園が取り壊される)	August 28, 2011	TBA
9	"A Link with Crazy, Handsome Guy! It was Discovered..."; Transliteration: "Mechaike to Rendō! Bareta..." (Japanese: めちゃイケと連動！バレた。。。)	September 4, 2011	TBA
10	"You're a Traitor"; Transliteration: "Omae wa Uragirimono da" (Japanese: お前は裏切り者だ)	September 11, 2011	TBA
11	"A Moment That Becomes One"; Transliteration: "Hitotsu ni naru Shunkan" (Japanese: ひとつになる瞬間)	September 18, 2011	7.3%

== Atomic bomb t-shirt controversy ==
Following the broadcast of Episode 5, Atsuko Maeda was seen wearing a T-shirt with the words "Little Boy" printed on the back and "Fool on the Hill Friends" printed on the front. As said episode aired the day after the anniversary of the Atomic bombing of Hiroshima, of which the bomb used was named "Little Boy", the series was criticized by viewers for its insensitivity.

Following this incident, the Hiroshima Prefectural Government received 130 complaints concerning this episode, and a public official called Fuji TV on the telephone to raise concerns about the T-shirt's insensitive nature. The City of Hiroshima also received 150 complaints via telephone and email by August 10.

In an interview with J-Cast News, the manufacturer of the t-shirt explained that this was meant to be a reference to several songs by The Beatles, namely Little Child and This Boy, as well as The Fool on the Hill. While they did state that they had no intention to make the connection with the bomb, they also apologized for the incident.

Preceded by Marumo no Okite (April 24 – July 3, 2011)	Fuji TV Dramatic Sunday; Sunday 21:00–21:54 (JST)	Succeeded by Boku to Star no 99 Nichi (October 23 – December 2011)
