= List of Boy's Abyss chapters =

Boy's Abyss is a Japanese manga series written and illustrated by Ryō Minenami. It was serialized in Shueisha's seinen manga magazine Weekly Young Jump magazine from February 27, 2020, to July 25, 2024. Shueisha collected its chapters in eighteen tankōbon volumes, released from July 17, 2020, to October 18, 2024.

In June 2022, Viz Media announced that they licensed the series for English publication.

== Volumes ==
No.	Original release date	Original ISBN	English release date	English ISBN
1	July 17, 2020	978-4-08-891601-9	April 25, 2023	978-1-9747-3668-3
1. "A Boy in Town" (その町の少年, Sono Machi no Shōnen); 2. "Secret Date" (お忍びデート, Oshinobi Dēto); 3. "Nagi Aoe" (青江ナギ, Aoe Nagi); 4. "Someone in the Way" (邪魔者, Jamamono); 5. "That Man" (件の男, Kudan no Otoko); 6. "Mad Dash" (疾走, Shissō); 7. "Abyss" (深淵 -アビス-, Shin'en -Abisu-)
2	September 18, 2020	978-4-08-891667-5	July 18, 2023	978-1-9747-3742-0
8. "What Happened That Night" (その夜の出来事, Sono Yoru no Dekigoto); 9. "The Typhoon Arrives" (あらしのよるに, Arashi no Yoru ni); 10. "High School Teacher" (高校教師, Kōkō Kyōshi); 11. "The Typhoon Passes" (台風一過, Taifū Ikka); 12. "An Adult in Town" (その町の大人, Sono Machi no Otona); 13. "Setting Sun" (落日, Rakujitsu); 14. "Red Spider Lily" (ヒガンバナ, Higanbana); 15. "Ambush" (まちぶせ, Machibuse); 16. "Dark Night" (暗夜, An'ya); 17. "Cemetery Hill" (墓のある丘, Haka no Aru Oka)
3	December 18, 2020	978-4-08-891798-6	October 17, 2023	978-1-9747-4056-7
18. "Waiting for the New Moon" (朔に待つ, Tsuki ni Matsu); 19. "Seducer"; 20. "Confessional" (告解, Kokkai); 21. "A Happy Future" (未来のある幸福, Mirai no Aru Kōfuku); 22. "Light" (光, Hikari); 23. "Aversion" (嫌悪, Ken'o); 24. "Silent Night" (静の夜, Sei no Yoru); 25. "Lust Redux" (再びの欲望, Futatabi no Yokubō); 26. "Lover's Abyss" (情死ヶ淵, Jōshigafuchi); 27. "Corrupted Sadness" (汚れた悲しみ, Yogoreta Kanashimi)
4	March 18, 2021	978-4-08-891818-1	January 23, 2024	978-1-9747-4281-3
28. "Soliloquy of the Outsider" (部外者の独白, Bugaisha no Dokuhaku); 29. "Death of Illusion" (幻想の死, Gensō no Shi); 30. "Contract" (契約, Keiyaku); 31. "Long-Standing" (積年, Sekinen); 32. "Decision" (決断, Ketsudan); 33. "Two Enclosures" (2つの囲い, Futatsu no Kakoi); 34. "Recurrence" (回帰, Kaiki); 35. "Mother and Night" (母と夜と, Haha to Yoru to); 36. "Date" (デート, Dēto); 37. "Leader" (指導者, Shidōsha)
5	June 18, 2021	978-4-08-892006-1	April 23, 2024	978-1-9747-4337-7
38. "Saving Hands" (救いの手, Sukui no Te); 39. "Someone to Rely On" (よすが, Yosuga); 40. "A Light" (灯火, Tōka); 41. "Drowned Corpse" (水死体, Suishitai); 42. "Bubbles" (泡沫, Utakata); 43. "The Guilty" (咎人, Toganin); 44. "Means of Escape" (手段, Shudan); 45. "The Town's Saint" (その町の聖母, Sono Machi no Seibo); 46. "Secret Meeting" (密会, Mikkai); 47. "Beyond" (果てより, Hate yori)
6	September 17, 2021	978-4-08-892071-9	July 23, 2024	978-1-9747-4597-5
48. "The Boy Who Came to Town" (その町に来た少年, Sono Machi ni Kita Shōnen); 49. "Waiting for Spring" (春を待つ, Haru o Matsu); 50. "First Love" (初恋, Hatsukoi); 51. "A Distraught Young Woman" (少女と修羅, Shōjo to Shura); 52. "Cracks" (罅, Hibi); 53. "Writhing" (蠢動, Shundō); 54. "Farce" (茶番, Chaban); 55. "Embrace" (抱擁, Hōyō); 56. "Bonds" (絆, Kizuna); 57. "Death" (死, Shi)
7	December 17, 2021	978-4-08-892163-1	October 22, 2024	978-1-9747-4895-2
58. "Cradle" (ゆりかご, Yurikago); 59. "Boy's Sin" (少年の罪, Shōnen no Tsumi); 60. "Empty" (虚, Uro); 61. "Hollow Victory" (虚しき勝者, Munashiki Shōsha); 62. "Sinking into Town" (町に沈む, Machi ni Shizumu); 63. "Twilight" (黄昏, Tasogare); 64. "Boy's Curse" (少年の呪詛, Shōnen no Juso); 65. "Moonlight" (月光, Gekkō); 66. "Hands" (手, Te); 67. "For Your Sake" (きみのために, Kimi no Tame ni); 68. "Confession While Guarding a Grave" (墓守の告白, Hakamori no Kokuhaku)
8	March 18, 2022	978-4-08-892244-7	January 28, 2025	978-1-9747-5150-1
69. "Chalice of Guilt" (罪悪の杯, Zaiaku no Hai); 70. "Frozen Town" (凍てる町, Iteru Machi); 71. "Smiling Woman" (笑う女, Warau Onna); 72. "'How Ya been?'" (「元気?」, "Genki?"); 73. "Our Failures" (ボクたちの失敗, Boku-tachi no Shippai); 74. "Two Alike" (似たもの同士, Nitamono Dōshi); 75. "Turning Over a New Leaf" (改心, Kaishin); 76. "Key" (鍵, Kagi); 77. "Brothers Suffocating" (窒息する兄弟, Chissoku Suru Kyōdai); 78. "Childhood Friends" (幼馴染, Osananajimi)
9	June 17, 2022	978-4-08-892339-0	April 22, 2025	978-1-9747-5244-7
79. "Since That Night..." (あの日から…, Ano Hi kara...); 80. "Room of Right Answers" (正解の部屋, Seikai no Heya); 81. "A Woman of This Town" (この町の女, Kono Machi no Onna); 82. "Quietly" (しんしんと..., Shinshin to...); 83. "Dark-Gray Town" (鈍色の町, Nibiiro no Machi); 84. "Beautiful, Fragile, Dark, Cold" (美しくて儚くて暗くて冷たい, Utsukushikute Hakanakute Kurakute Tsumetai); 85. "Goodbye Adults" (さよなら、オトナたち, Sayonara, Otona-tachi); 86. "The Youth of That Town" (あの町の少年たち, Ano Machi no Shōnen-tachi); 87. "Before and After Dreams" (夢のあとさき, Yume no Atosaki); 88. "Old Acquaintances" (旧知, Kyūchi); Bonus: "Full of Promise" (センコウショウジョ, Senkō Shōjo)
10	September 16, 2022	978-4-08-892428-1	July 22, 2025	978-1-9747-5532-5
89. "Mother and Son's Abyss" (母と子のアビス, Haha to Ko no Abisu); 90. "Late-Night Conversations" (夜に語る, Yoru ni Kataru); 91. "The Day Before the Storm" (嵐の前日, Arashi no Zenjitsu); 92. "Festival" (祭り, Matsuri); 93. "Worse Comes to Worst" (挙句, Ageku); 94. "Elegantly Smiling" (少女は嫋やかに笑う, Shōjo wa Taoyaka ni Warau); 95. "Festival of Scars" (痕の祭り, Ato no Matsuri); 96. "First Broken Heart" (散りゆく初恋, Chiri Yuku Hatsukoi); 97. "Christmas Eve" (イヴの夜, Ivu no Yoru); 98. "Heat Haze" (陽炎, Kagerō); Bonus: "Born and Raised in Tokyo" (東京生まれ、 東京育ち。, Tōkyō Umare, Tōkyō Sodachi)
11	December 19, 2022	978-4-08-892563-9	October 28, 2025	978-1-9747-5852-4
99. "The Flow of the Writing" (筆が走る, Fude ga Hashiru); 100. "Sublimation" (昇華, Shōka); 101. "Impatience and Rain" (焦燥と、雨, Shōsō to, Ame); 102. "Overflowing Waters" (溢れる水の中で, Afureru Mizu no Naka de); 103. "Karma" (業-カルマ-, Gō -Karuma-); 104. "Muddy Waters" (濁流, Dakuryū); 105. "Demon" (悪魔, Akuma); 106. "Leaving Town" (町との別れ, Machi to no Wakare); 107. "Reiji" (レイジ); 108. "Aquarium of Eternal Return" (永劫回帰の水槽, Eigōkaiki no Suisō)
12	March 17, 2023	978-4-08-892628-5	January 27, 2026	978-1-9747-6183-8
109. "The Novelist's Farewell" (小説家との別れ, Shōsetsuka to no Wakare); 110. "The Kurose Family" (黒瀬家, Kurose-ke); 111. "The Other Shore" (対岸, Taigan); 112. "Iron Clamp" (鎹, Kasugai); 113. "The Sea" (海, Umi); 114. "Two Deities of Death" (二人の死神, Futari no Shinigami); 115. "Big Brother" (お兄ちゃん, Oniichan); 116. "Dawn" (夜明け, Yoake); 117. "The Dregs" (澱, Ori); 118. "Maelstrom" (渦, Uzu)
13	June 19, 2023	978-4-08-892717-6	April 28, 2026	978-1-9747-6257-6
119. "Cornered Rats" (窮鼠, Kyūso); 120. "Comings and Goings" (去る者、来る者, Saru Mono, Kuru Mono); 121. "Embraces" (抱かれて, Idakarete); 122. "Together Again" (また、一緒, Mata, Issho); 123. "Ant Lion" (蟻地獄, Arijigoku); 124. "Sundown" (日没, Nichibotsu); 125. "Teacher and Student" (先生と生徒, Sensei to Seito); 126. "Boundary" (境界, Kyōkai); 127. "Love Wanders" (彷徨う愛, Samayou Ai); 128. "Where Is Gen Minegishi?" (峰岸玄のいる場所, Minegishi Gen no Iru Basho); 129. "I'll Wait for You Forever" (いつまでもキミを待つ, Itsumademo Kimi o Matsu)
14	September 19, 2023	978-4-08-892819-7	July 21, 2026	978-1-9747-6506-5
130. "Silent River" (沈黙の川, Chinmoku no Kawa); 131. "Nothingness" (無, Mu); 132. "The Sun Rises, Only to Sink Again" (日はまた昇る、沈むために, Hi wa Mata Noboru, Shizumu tame ni); 133. "Young Women" (少女たち, Shōjo-tachi); 134. "Q&A" (質疑, Shitsugi); 135. "Wrath" (怒り, Ikari); 136. "Perplexity" (惑い, Madoi); 137. "Disconnection" (断絶, Danzetsu); 138. "The Person Fades" (消えゆく人, Kieyuku Hito); 139. "Too Late" (いまさら, Imasara); 140. "Deepest Contempt" (心底からの軽蔑を, Shinsoko kara no Keibetsu o)
15	December 19, 2023	978-4-08-893052-7	October 27, 2026	978-1-9747-6543-0
141. "Building Bridges" (橋渡し, Hashiwatashi); 142. "Lies and Truth" (嘘と本当, Uso to Hontō); 143. "A Good End" (上出来の物語, Jōdeki no Monogatari); 144. "Heroine" (主人公, Shujinkō); 145. "A Letter from Akira Nozoe" (野添旭からの手紙, Nozoe Akira kara no Tegami); 146. "Eyes" (目, Me); 147. "Husband and Wife" (夫婦, Fūfu); 148. "Is Love Wrong?" (愛で悪いか, Ai de Warui ka); 149. "Downfall" (瓦解, Gakai); 150. "Birthday" (バースデイ, Bāsudei)
16	March 18, 2024	978-4-08-893163-0	January 26, 2027	978-1-9747-6607-9
151. Mugen (夢幻); 152. Sora no Yoru (空の夜); 153. Menkai (面会); 154. Kiri no Naka (霧の中); 155. Akkenaku (あっけなく); 156. Chi no Kyōdai (血の兄弟); 157. Shōshitsu (消失); 158. Yukue (行方); 159. Shinigami to Oni (死神と鬼); 160. Negai (願い)
17	July 18, 2024	978-4-08-893206-4	—	—
161. Kondaku (混濁); 162. Kigeki (喜劇); 163. Jōryū (上流); 164. Kage (影); 165. Kidzuki (気づき); 166. Tesaguri (手探り); 167. On'na to Kodomo (女と子供); 168. Suisō no Futari (水槽の二人); 169. Sono Machi no Shōjo (その町の少女); 170. Kokuhaku (告白); 171. Noroi (詛); 172. Saigo no Negai (最後の願い)
18	October 18, 2024	978-4-08-893384-9	—	—
173. Tadashī Inochi no hi (正しい命の火); 174. Kyōhan (共犯); 175. Yuusui (誘水); 176. Kaihō (解放); 177. Bukimina Shōnen (不気味な少年); 178. Ōjōgiwa no Saikai (往生際の再会); 179. Anata (あなた); 180. Anata ga Kyō o Ikite iru to iu Koto (あなたが今日を生きているということ); 181. Nukarumi (泥濘); 182. Dare mo Inai (誰もいない); 183. Sono Machi no, Shōnen Shōjodatta-sha-tachi (その町の、少年少女だった者たち)
