= Bunny Drop (film) =

- Poster promoting Bunny Drop in Japan
- Directed by: Sabu
- Screenplay by: Sabu; Tamio Hayashi
- Story by: Yumi Unita
- Based on: Bunny Drop by Yumi Unita
- Produced by: Hitoshi Matsumoto; Yasushi Utagawa
- Starring: Kenichi Matsuyama; Karina; Mana Ashida
- Cinematography: Hiroo Yanagida
- Edited by: Naoya Bandō
- Music by: Takashi Mori; Shoko Suzuki (Theme song "Sweet Drops" by Puffy)
- Distributed by: Showgate
- Release dates: June 2011 (Shanghai Festival); 20 August 2011 (Japan)
- Running time: 114 minutes
- Country: Japan
- Language: Japanese
- Box office: US$6,569,857

Bunny Drop (うさぎドロップ, Usagi Doroppu), also known as Usagi Drop, is a 2011 Japanese drama film based on the manga of the same name by Yumi Unita. The film is directed by Sabu, and the screenplay was done by both Sabu and scriptwriter Tamio Hayashi. Bunny Drop stars actor Kenichi Matsuyama, who plays Daikichi, an office worker and a single man. Child actress Mana Ashida also plays Rin, a six-year-old illegitimate child of Daikichi's grandfather, in the film.

Bunny Drop made its international debut at the 14th Shanghai International Film Festival, where it was warmly received. It was subsequently released in Japanese cinemas on 20 August 2011.

== Plot ==
While attending the funeral of his late grandfather, Soichi Kaga, office worker Daikichi Kawachi learns about the existence of Souchi's illegitimate six-year-old daughter, Rin. Due to her illegitimacy, other family members treat her as an outcast, refuse to adopt her, and are planning to put her into a foster home/orphanage. Daikichi decides to take matters into his own hands and raise Rin.

Daikichi has to deal with the new challenges of raising a child alone. He has to take her to an overtime daycare center located far away from both his house and his office, thus causing him to turn up late at his office every day. Eventually, Daikichi chooses to be demoted to a labor position to prevent fatigue and give him more time with Rin after work. Nevertheless, Daikichi's decision to raise Rin changes the both of them: Daikichi becomes happier in his playtime with Rin, while Rin, who previously only talked with Soichi, opens up and regards Daikichi as both a father and a friend.

However, Daikichi's position is frequently challenged by other family members, including his sister, Kazumi, who openly states her dislike of children and urges Daikichi to not overwork himself, although she grows to adore Rin as time goes on, as well as a nanny, Yumiko Sugiyama, who urges Daikichi to stop sacrificing his life for Rin's sake. At one time, Daikichi discovers the identity of Rin's mother: a manga artist called Masako Yoshii. He arranges for a meeting with her and is disgusted upon learning that she never sees Rin as a daughter, though her position on the matter is ambiguous. He decides to adopt Rin.

At the daycare center, Daikichi is introduced to model Yukari Nitani, the mother of Rin's friend, Koki. Yukari helps Daikichi in parenting Rin and becomes close to him. One day after school, Koki asks Rin to accompany him in visiting his father's grave at the cemetery, but their sudden disappearances cause panic for Daikichi, Yukari, and the people close to them. When they return, Daikichi begs Rin not to run away from him ever again.

Daikichi, his family, and Yukari are later seen watching a play in the daycare center featuring Rin and Koki, while Masako, who spots a photo published from the event on her computer, sadly looks on.

== Cast ==
- Kenichi Matsuyama as Daikichi Kawachi (河地 大吉)
- Karina as Yukari Nitani (二谷 ゆかり)
- Mana Ashida as Rin Kaga (鹿賀 りん)
- Mirei Kiritani as Kazumi Kawachi (河地 カズミ)
- Mayu Kitaki as Masako Yoshii (吉井 正子)
- Ruiki Sato as Koki Nitani (二谷 コウキ)
- Taisaku Akino as Kenichi (憲一)
- Yō Yoshida as Haruko Maeda (前田 春子)
- Sotaro Nagasawa as Hideyuki Maeda (前田 秀幸)
- Mari Tanabe as Reina Maeda (前田 麗奈)
- Narushi Ikeda as Hidaka (日高)
- Ryo Kimura as Yuichi Suzuki (鈴木 雄一)
- Masashi Hirai as Soichi Kaga (鹿賀 宋一)
- Gō Ayano as Kyoichi (キョウイチ)
- Atsuko Takahata as Yumiko Sugiyama (杉山 由美子)
- Chizuru Ikewaki as Yuki Goto (後藤 由起)
- Jun Fubuki as Yoshie Kawachi (河地 良恵)
- Baijaku Nakamura II as Minoru Kawachi (河地 実)

== Production ==
=== Development ===
Shodensha's Feel Young women's magazine officially announced on 8 June 2010 that the manga Bunny Drop would be adapted into a live-action film. The director, Sabu, made his directorial debut with the film Bullet Runner in 1996, and since then, he had directed many other widely acclaimed films at various international film festivals. Sabu, together with scriptwriter Tamio Hayashi, was in charge of adapting the screenplay of the film from the manga Bunny Drop.

The film's cast was officially announced on 5 August 2010. Kenichi Matsuyama, who had previously starred in films like Death Note and Gantz, plays Daikichi, a 30-year-old who raises the illegitimate child of his grandfather. This was the first time Kenichi had played the role of a father. Child actress Mana Ashida played alongside him in the role of Rin, the illegitimate six-year-old child of Daikichi's grandfather. Mana Ashida had previously starred in the television series Mother.

=== Filming ===
The filming of Bunny Drop took place started in a residential area of Kawasaki in Kanagawa Prefecture. Filming started on 21 July 2010, ending the same month.

Director Sabu mentioned that the entire filming was done without a prepared script. He had reportedly done that because he wanted to have a natural reaction from the actors. The filming staff was told of this just before the production of the film began. Mana Ashida and Ruiki Sato, who played the roles of Rin's kindergarten classmates, therefore did not have a prepared script to follow during shooting. Instead, they spent one month with the film's assistant director going through each and every scene in detail before the actual filming.

A video of the filming showed that actor Kenichi Matsuyama was like a "natural parent" to fellow child actress Mana Ashida. In a scene where they were shopping at a department store, Kenichi looked peaceful while choosing bags and shoes for Mana Ashida.

=== Post-production ===
It was officially announced on 21 February 2011 that Bunny Drop would be released in Japan on 20 August 2011. The film poster was also unveiled to the public at the same time. An official film teaser was also put up on the film's official website on the same day. The official full-length trailer of the film was added to the film's website on 29 April 2011.

It was later announced that Bunny Drop would be involved in a campaign with The Japan Crime Prevention Association's public advocacy program, with Bunny Drop posters placed in public areas such as the police headquarters and educational institutions.

=== Theme song ===
The theme song of this film is the song "Sweet Drops", sung by the duo Puffy. The same song was also used for the anime television series adaptation of the same manga.

The theme song was officially announced on 2 April 2011. The duo said that they were big fans of the original Bunny Drop manga series, and that they used "lovely flowers" as material for this song. "Sweet Drops" was also released on the 15th anniversary of Puffy's debut into the music scene.

== Release ==
Bunny Drop made its film festival debut at the 14th Shanghai International Film Festival. Actor Kenichi Matsuyama made a surprise appearance there, and received a very warm reception from the audience. All of the approximately 3,000 seats available for the film's six screenings at the festival sold out.

Bunny Drop had a special screening prior to its cinema release at Osaka Station City Cinema in Osaka Station, Osaka on 12 July 2011. Director Sabu and the lead actress Mana Ashida were present to greet the audience there. Another special screening was held at Roppongi cinema in Tokyo on 18 August 2011. There, actor Nobuhiko Takada made a special guest appearance.

Bunny Drop was officially released in Japan on 20 August 2011. The film's cast were present to greet the audience at the film's debut ceremony at the Shinjuku Piccadilly. Actress Yumi Yoshimura also made a surprise guest appearance at the event. Bunny Drop was released on 110 screens across Japan on its debut weekend.

== Reception ==
=== Box office ===
During its debut weekend on 20–21 August 2011, the film became the 9th highest-grossing film in Japanese cinemas. Over this two-day period, Bunny Drop attracted an audience of around 80,000 people, and grossed about 100 million yen nationwide.

=== Critical reception ===
Mark Schilling of The Japan Times labelled the film Bunny Drop as "Bunny-based drama is a warm but overly fluffy tail" and gave it an overall score of 2.5 out of 5. He praised the main cast, saying that "(Kenichi) Matsuyama ... works well with pint-sized costar Ashida." and added that Kenichi was like a "like a caring, playful big brother". He also praised child actress Mana Ashida, saying that she "seamlessly accomplishes her evolution from forlorn waif to perky if unusually perceptive kid, while effortlessly charming everyone." However, the reviewer criticized the film for "the lack of friction between the (main) characters". He also criticized the "tear-jerking cliches" in the film, which he said was "Sabu's biggest problem as a director".
