= Beautiful Rain =

- poster
- Genre: Drama
- Starring: Etsushi Toyokawa, Mana Ashida
- Country of origin: Japan
- Original language: Japanese

Production
- Camera setup: Multi-camera
- Running time: 54 minutes
- Production companies: Fuji TV; Kyodo TV

Original release
- Network: Fuji TV
- Release: July 1, 2012 – September 2012

Beautiful Rain (ビューティフルレイン) is a 2012 Japanese television drama series. It stars Etsushi Toyokawa as Keisuke and Mana Ashida as Miu, his daughter. Keisuke is diagnosed with Early-onset Alzheimer's disease, which drastically affects the family's life.

Beautiful Rain aired from 1 July 2012 as part of Fuji Television's Dramatic Sunday time slot, from 9pm to 9:54pm.

== Cast ==
- Etsushi Toyokawa as Keisuke Kinoshita
- Mana Ashida as Miu Kinoshita
- Shohei Miura as Akio Katsuta
- Denden as Kiyoshi Muneta
- Ken Yasuda as Yutaka Koga
- Sayuri Kokusho as Serai Takagi
- Haruko Arai as Kotaro Arai
- Asaya Kimijima as Kenta Tachibana
- Riko Yoshida as Nako Matsuyama
- Mitsuko Oka as Chieko Nakamura
- Keizo Kanie as Tomio Nakamura
- Miki Nakatani as Akane Nishiwaki

== Episodes ==
	Episode title	Romanized title	Translation of title	Broadcast date	Ratings
Ep. 1	最近、父ちゃんは忘れ物が多い…	Saikin, tōchan wa wasuremono ga ōi…	Recently, Dad seems to have forgotten many things...	July 1, 2012	12.9%
Ep. 2	記憶を失うとき一番大切な人を傷つける	Kioku o ushinau toki ichiban taisetsunahito o kizutsukeru	When you lose your memory, the most important people to you will be hurt	July 8, 2012	9.5%
Ep. 3	…父ちゃん、アルツハイマーってなに?	… Tōchan, arutsuhaimā tte nani?	...Dad, what is Alzheimer's?	July 15, 2012	8.6%
Ep. 4	母が遺した贈り物…父娘の切ない約束	Haha ga nokoshita okurimono… chichi musume no setsunai yakusoku	The gift that your mother left behind... The painful pact between dad and mom	July 22, 2012	13.0%
Ep. 5	忘れたくない…父と娘の夏の想い出	Wasuretakunai… chichitoko no natsu no omoide	The memory that I do not want to forget...The memories of a father's and daughter's summer together	July 29, 2012	9.5%
Ep. 6	親子だからこそ…、言えない秘密	Oyakodakara koso…, ienai himitsu	That is why between a parent and a child... there is no secrets that cannot be said	August 5, 2012	10.9%
Ep. 7	二人で暮らせない辛い父の決断…	Futari de kurasenai tsurai chichi no ketsudan…	Father's painful decision that the two of us cannot live together	August 12, 2012	8.0%
Ep. 8	親なのに、離れる。親だから、離れる	Oyananoni, hanareru. Oyadakara, hanareru	Parents will leave nonetheless, so parents, please leave	August 19, 2012	8.7%
Ep. 9	娘の未来のために…今、伝えるべき真実	Musume no mirai no tameni… ima, tsutaerubeki shinjitsu	For the sake of my daughter's future, I will tell the truth now	August 26, 2012	9.3%
Ep. 10	父ちゃん、美雨の事忘れちゃうの?	Tōchan, Miu no koto wasure chau no?	Dad, have you forgotten about Miu's things?	September 2, 2012	10.5%
Ep. 11	残された時間、娘のために今できること	Nokosa reta jikan, musume no tame ni imadekirukoto	Do what you can now with your daughter in the time that you have left.	September 9, 2012	9.6%
Ep. 12	私が全部おぼえているよ	Watashi ga zenbu oboete iru yo	I will remember everything.	September 16, 2012	9.6%
Ratings for Kanto region (average rating: 10.1%)

Preceded by Kazoku no Uta (15/4/2012 - 3/6/2012)	Fuji TV Dramatic Sunday ドラマチック・サンデー; Sundays 21:00 - 21:54 (JST)	Succeeded by Tokyo Airport: Air Traffic Controller (14/10/2012 - December 2012)
