= Jewelpet the Movie: Sweets Dance Princess =

2012 film by Hiroaki Sakurai

- Theatrical release poster
- Japanese: 映画ジュエルペット スウィーツダンスプリンセス
- Revised Hepburn: Eiga Juerupetto: Suwītsu Dansu Purinsesu
- Directed by: Hiroaki Sakurai
- Screenplay by: Takashi Yamada
- Based on: Jewelpet by Sanrio and Sega
- Produced by: Atsushi Takahashi; Hideyuki Kachi
- Starring: Ayaka Saito; Aya Hirano; Nozomi Sasaki; Miyuki Sawashiro; Aki Toyosaki; Kenn; Mako; Ai Shimizu; Rina Hidaka; Mana Ashida; Hiroki Shimowada; Yumiko Kobayashi
- Cinematography: Shinichi Igarashi
- Edited by: Yumiko Nakaba
- Music by: Wataru Maeguchi
- Production company: Studio Comet
- Distributed by: Toho Co., Ltd.
- Release date: August 11, 2012
- Running time: 65 minutes
- Country: Japan
- Language: Japanese

Jewelpet the Movie: Sweets Dance Princess (Japanese: 映画ジュエルペット スウィーツダンスプリンセス, Hepburn: Eiga Juerupetto: Suwītsu Dansu Purinsesu) is a 2012 Japanese animated fantasy comedy film directed by Hiroaki Sakurai and written by Takashi Yamada; the film is based on the Jewelpet franchise by Sanrio and Sega. Produced by Studio Comet and distributed by Toho, Sweets Dance Princess features an original story set in an alternate universe from the Jewelpet franchise; While celebrating a birthday in Sweets Land, Ruby and her friends help Gumimin from saving the land from impending chaos. The film stars the voices of Ayaka Saito, Aya Hirano, Nozomi Sasaki, Miyuki Sawashiro, Aki Toyosaki, Kenn, Mako, Ai Shimizu, Rina Hidaka, Mana Ashida, Hiroki Shimowada, and Yumiko Kobayashi. The film was released in Japan on August 11, 2012, alongside Onegai My Melody: Yu & Ai short film as a double feature.

== Plot ==
Ruby and some of her friends are all headed to Sweets Land, the home of the Sweetspets and Jewel Land's neighboring kingdom, to celebrate her birthday with a special dance. However, during the preparations, a strange thing falls from the skies, containing a Sweetspet boy named Gumimin. Unknown to everyone, he may be the only one who can save Sweets Land from impending chaos, and eat all the sweets in Sweets Land to help save it.

== Voice cast ==
Main characters

Character	Voice actor
Ruby	Ayaka Saito
Garnet	Aya Hirano
Sapphie	Nozomi Sasaki
Labra	Miyuki Sawashiro
Angela	Aki Toyosaki
Jasper	Kenn
Charotte	Mako
Sango	Ai Shimizu
Sakuran	Rina Hidaka

Guest characters

- Mana Ashida as Princess Mana (マーナ姫, Māna hime): The daughter of the rulers of the Sweetsland Kingdom, Mana is celebrating her seventh birthday in the series. Despite being born in a high-class family, she is down-to-earth with everyone. Mana is an aspiring manga artist who also loves cake and dancing. She also wields a crown that allows her to collect and use magic from the Sweetspets, amplifying it.
- Hiroki Shimowada as Duke Creme de Brûlée (クレーム・ド・ブリュレ公爵, Kurēmu do buryure kōshaku): Duke Creme de Brûlée is the young duke of the Sweetsland Kingdom, who wanted the whole kingdom for himself. He has a secret agenda and wants Mana's affections while overthrowing the kingdom. Chocolat is one of his agents, sent to spy over Ruby's friends. He is also responsible for sending Gumimin's to Ruby's friends, with the problem with his memories being erased.
- Yumiko Kobayashi as Park (パクくん, Pakukun) / Gumimin (グミミン, Gumimin): A Fennec fox Sweetspet who came down from the skies of Sweetsland during Ruby's and her friends dance practice. In his first appearance, he suffers from Amnesia and has recollection on who he is, given the name Park by his friends. Park tends to be airhead and also likes all types of sweets, but also wants to be supportive to Ruby. The Duke is taking interests on him as he is later revealed to be a Legendary Sweetspet. Yuko stated that Gumimin's motif is Gummy candy during the film's press conference.

== Production ==
=== Development ===
The film was first announced in February 2012 and introduced the Sweetspets, who debuted in Jewelpet Sunshine, as well as other characters that are exclusively created for the film. A short 30-second trailer of the film was streamed on March 1, 2012. A press conference of the film was held on March 30, 2012, which occurred at the Imperial Hotel, Tokyo to promote the film. Along the guest stars were child actress Mana Ashida and the designer of Hello Kitty, Yuko Yamaguchi. Yamaguchi stated that Ashida's singing and dancing is both cute and energetic and fits well with the film's theme.

=== Music ===
The film's opening theme is "Magic of Dreams" (夢の魔法, Yume no Mahō) and the ending theme is "Friends Forever and Ever" (ずっとずっとトモダチ, Zutto Zutto Tomodachi), both performed by the Japanese child actress and singer Mana Ashida. The latter song also serves as the ending theme of Jewelpet Kira☆Deco! that was released on May 16, 2012, while "Magic of Dreams" is an entirely new song especially composed for the film. The film's official soundtrack album, titled Jewelpet the Movie: Sweets Dance Princess Soundtrack (映画ジュエルペット スウィーツダンスプリンセス サウンドトラック, Eiga Juerupetto: Suwītsu Dansu Purinsesu Saundotorakku) was released on August 8, 2012.

== Release ==
The film was released in theaters in Japan on August 11, 2012, alongside Onegai My Melody: Yu & Ai short film as a double feature. DVD and Blu-ray versions of the film were released on January 25, 2013.

== Reception ==
The film was a box-office failure, scoring at No. 14 on Box Office Mojo's chart and earning US$355,395 on 106 screens from August 11–12. It then fell from the list a week later.
