= Inu to Anata no Monogatari =

Inu to Anata no Monogatari: Inu no Eiga
- Film poster
- Directed by: Shunichi Nagasaki; Hisashi Eto; Soichi Ishii; Jun Kawanishi; Yutaka Mizuochi; Naoto Nakanishi
- Written by: Jun Kawanishi; Keita Yamada; Ai Ota
- Produced by: Takashige Ichise
- Starring: Akira Nakao; Atsuko Takahata; Chiharu; Katsuhisa Namase; Kie Kitano
- Music by: Masamichi Shigeno; Masaru Yokoyama; Remedios
- Production companies: Oz Company; TBS Holdings; Kyoraku Sangyo; Entertainment Farm; CELL; PPM; Hakuhodo; Imagica; Kadokawa Shoten
- Distributed by: Asmik Ace Entertainment
- Release date: 22 January 2011 (Japan)
- Running time: 88 minutes
- Country: Japan
- Language: Japanese
- Box office: ¥176 million

Inu to Anata no Monogatari: Inu no Eiga (Japanese: 犬とあなたの物語 いぬのえいが; lit. "The Story of You and the Dog: A Dog Movie"), also known as Happy Together: All About My Dog, is a 2011 Japanese anthology drama film directed by Shunichi Nagasaki, Hisashi Eto, Soichi Ishii, Jun Kawanishi, Yutaka Mizuochi and Naoto Nakanishi. It is the sequel to the 2005 film All About My Dog. It opened in Japanese cinemas on 22 January 2011.

== Cast ==
- Akira Nakao
- Atsuko Takahata
- Chiharu
- Katsuhisa Namase
- Kie Kitano
- Maki Sakai
- Mana Ashida
- Masaaki Uchino
- Naho Toda
- Nanako Matsushima
- Nao Omori
- Roi Hayashi
- Shingo Tsurumi
