= Hatsukoi Zombie =

Japanese manga series

- First tankōbon volume cover

初恋ゾンビ (Hatsukoi Zonbi)
- Genre: Romantic comedy
- Manga
- Written by: Ryou Minenami
- Published by: Shogakukan
- Imprint: Shōnen Sunday Comics
- Magazine: Weekly Shōnen Sunday
- Original run: October 14, 2015 – March 27, 2019
- Volumes: 17

Hatsukoi Zombie (Japanese: 初恋ゾンビ, Hepburn: Hatsukoi Zonbi; lit. "First Love Zombie") is a Japanese manga series written and illustrated by Ryou Minenami. It was serialized in Shogakukan's Weekly Shōnen Sunday from October 2015 to March 2019, with its chapters collected in 17 tankōbon volumes.

== Plot ==
The series revolves around Tarou Kurume, a boy who is not interested in love. One day, he is hit on the head by a baseball during a P.E. class, leaving him with a severe concussion. When he wakes up at the infirmary, he is welcomed by a pink-haired, cheerful, well-endowed and scantily clad girl who is seemingly floating in the air. Not only that, he starts to see similar "ghosts" around countless boys, and finds out that they are fantasized versions of the first girl they loved, with the floating zombie above Tarou representing his first love.

== Characters ==
Tarou Kurume (久留目 タロウ, Kurume Tarou)
A 15-year-old boy who is childhood friends with Mei Ebino. Tarou believes in "energy-saving" and initially has no interest in love-related matters.
Eve (イヴ, Ivu)
Tarou's first love zombie. Unlike most other zombies, Eve is self-aware and able to interact with her owner. She often appears floating above Tarou's head wearing sparkly flowing pink hair with a hair accessory, and a white high school girl uniform.
Ririto Ibusuki (指宿 凛々澄, Ibusuki Ririto)
Tarou's first love, from when they were in the same English class ten years ago.
Mei Ebino (江火野 芽衣, Ebino Mei)
Tarou's childhood friend and neighbor, she attends the same school as him and is responsible for the injury that begins all of Tarou's troubles.

== Publication ==
Written and illustrated by Ryou Minenami, Hatsukoi Zombie was serialized in Shogakukan's shōnen manga magazine Weekly Shōnen Sunday from October 14, 2015, to March 27, 2019. Shogakukan collected its chapters in 17 tankōbon volumes, released from March 18, 2016, to June 18, 2019.

=== Volumes ===
No.	Japanese release date	Japanese ISBN
1	March 18, 2016	978-4-09-126440-4
2	June 17, 2016	978-4-09-127168-6
3	August 18, 2016	978-4-09-127324-6
4	October 18, 2016	978-4-09-127401-4
5	December 16, 2016	978-4-09-127457-1
6	March 17, 2017	978-4-09-127512-7
7	May 18, 2017	978-4-09-127563-9
8	July 18, 2017	978-4-09-127665-0
9	October 18, 2017	978-4-09-127857-9
10	January 18, 2018	978-4-09-128079-4
11	April 18, 2018	978-4-09-128242-2
12	June 18, 2018	978-4-09-128264-4
13	September 18, 2018	978-4-09-128397-9
14	December 18, 2018	978-4-09-128594-2
15	March 18, 2019	978-4-09-128804-2
16	May 17, 2019	978-4-09-129159-2
17	June 18, 2019	978-4-09-129168-4

== See also ==
- Boy's Abyss, another manga series by the same author
