= Maru Maru Mori Mori! =

2011 single by Kaoru to Tomoki, Tamani Mook

"Maru-Maru-Mori-Mori!"

Single by Kaoru to Tomoki, Tamani Mook
- Released: May 25, 2011
- Recorded: 2011
- Genre: J-pop
- Length: 18:35
- Label: UNIVERSAL MUSIC (UMCA-50005)
- Songwriter: Koji Miyashita
- Producer: Koike Kazuhiko

"Maru Maru Mori Mori!" (マル・マル・モリ・モリ!) is the first single by the group Kaoru to Tomoki, Tamani Mook, released on 25 May 2011 by Universal Music. This group is specially formed for the Fuji Television television drama series Marumo no Okite, and consists of actor Fuku Suzuki and actress Mana Ashida, both of whom are the lead stars in the drama series. Maru Maru Mori Mori! is also the theme song for Marumo no Okite.

== Track listing ==
All tracks are written by Koji Miyashita.

No.	Title	Length
1.	"Maru-Maru-Mori-Mori! (Full Length)" (マル・マル・モリ・モリ! (フルサイズ))	3:47
2.	"Maru-Maru-Mori-Mori! (Television Length)" (マル・マル・モリ・モリ! (テレビサイズ))	1:41
3.	"Maru-Maru-Mori-Mori!~Let's sing with Kaoru-chan! (Kaoru's part in the song)" (マル・マル・モリ・モリ! ~薫ちゃんと歌おう! (薫パート歌入りバージョン))	3:49
4.	"Maru-Maru-Mori-Mori!~Let's sing with Tomoki-kun! (Tomoki's part in the song)" (マル・マル・モリ・モリ! ~友樹くんと歌おう! (友樹パート歌入りバージョン))	3:49
5.	"Maru-Maru-Mori-Mori! (Full Length Karaoke)" (マル・マル・モリ・モリ! (フルサイズカラオケ))	3:47
6.	"Maru-Maru-Mori-Mori! (Television Length Karaoke)" (マル・マル・モリ・モリ! (テレビサイズカラオケ))	1:41
Total length:		18:35

== Production ==
On 4 April 2011, it was announced that the theme song of the Fuji Television television drama Marumo no Okite will be sung by actress Mana Ashida and Fuku Suzuki, both of whom are also starring in the television drama. They formed a temporary group called Kaoru to Tomoki, Tamani Mook, and the song that they will be singing is entitled Maru Maru Mori Mori!

== Reception ==
This singles album debuted on the Oricon charts at the third position with sales of around 35 thousand albums in the first week. This makes the group Kaoru to Tomoki, Tamani Mook (薫と友樹、たまにムック, Kaoru to Tomoki, tama ni Mukku) the youngest group ever to debut in the top 10 charts at the average of 6 years old, beating the previous record set by the group Kigurumi (キグルミ) for their singles Tarako・Tarako・Tarako (たらこ・たらこ・たらこ) in September 2006. This album also occasionally reached the first position on the Oricon daily charts.

The Recording Industry Association of Japan ranked Maru Maru Mori Mori! fourth in the top downloaded singles from the Chaku-Uta pay chart ranking in the first half of 2011. This placed this single ahead of other singles from groups like AKB48 and Girls' Generation. The song was certified by the RIAJ as a double platinum ringtone, and a platinum full-length download to cellphones. Sankei Sports reported that Maru Maru Mori Mori! crossed the 250 thousand album sales mark as of 17 July 2011. This makes the group the first Japanese group under 10 years old to exceed 200 thousand sales mark in over 35 years, the last person to do so being Kawahashi Hiroshi with his single Yamaguchi-sanchi no Tsutomu-kun.

On 16 August 2011, Oricon reported that this singles managed to remain in the top 10 list for 12 weeks in a row. Amongst singles released by an artist under 10 years old, Maru Maru Mori Mori! now holds the record of the longest streak on the Oricon charts. The previous record set by the 2007 song Gake no Ue no Ponyo, the theme song of the Studio Ghibli film Ponyo, which remained on the charts for 11 consecutive weeks in 2008. Gake no Ue no Ponyo featured the then 8-year old actress Nozomi Ōhashi.

The song Maru Maru Mori Mori received the Special Award at the 53rd Japan Record Awards.

== See also ==
- Marumo no Okite
- Mana Ashida
- Fuku Suzuki
