= Ghost: Mouichido Dakishimetai =

- Theatrical release poster
- Directed by: Taro Otani
- Written by: Shimako Satō; Miho Nakazono
- Screenplay by: Miho Nakazono; Shimako Satō
- Story by: Bruce Joel Rubin
- Based on: Ghost by Jerry Zucker
- Produced by: Takashige Ichise
- Starring: Nanako Matsushima; Song Seung-heon; Kirin Kiki
- Cinematography: Takuro Ishizaka
- Edited by: Yoshifumi Fukasawa
- Music by: Michiru Oshima
- Production companies: Nippon Television Network Corporation; Paramount Productions Japan; PPM; Shochiku; D.N. Dream! Partners; Yomiuri Telecasting; CJ Entertainment Inc.; CJ Entertainment Japan; VAP; CELL; Sapporo Television; Miyagi Television; Shizuoka Daiichi Television; Chūkyō Television; Hiroshima Telecasting; Fukuoka Broadcasting System; Oz Company
- Distributed by: Paramount Pictures; Shochiku
- Release dates: November 13, 2010 (Japan); November 25, 2010 (South Korea)
- Running time: 116 minutes
- Countries: Japan; South Korea
- Language: Japanese
- Box office: US$9,833,553

Ghost: Mouichido Dakishimetai (Japanese: ゴースト もういちど抱きしめたい; lit. "Ghost: I Want to Embrace You One More Time") is a 2010 Japanese supernatural romance film directed by Taro Otani. This film is a remake of the 1990 American film Ghost. It is directed by Taro Otani and it stars Nanako Matsushima, Song Seung-heon, Mana Ashida and Kirin Kiki.

== Plot ==
Nanami Hoshino, a wealthy entrepreneur, marries Korean potter Kim Jun-ho, and they both live a seemingly happy life. Then, one month after their marriage, Nanami is killed by a biker on her way home. This tragedy leaves Jun-ho completely devastated. At the hospital, Nanami's ghost arises from her body, and upon meeting a ghost child, she realizes that she is a ghost whose presence cannot be seen. She then realizes that her death was no coincidence and Jun-ho is in imminent danger. Unable to communicate with normal humans, Nanami seeks help from the elderly psychic Unten in hopes of saving Jun-ho's life.

== Cast ==
- Nanako Matsushima as Nanami Hoshino (星野 七海 Hoshino Nanami)
- Song Seung-heon as Kim Jun-ho (キム・ジュノ Kimu Juno)
- Kirin Kiki as Unten (運天五月)
- Mana Ashida as the kid Ghost (少女のゴースト)
- Satoshi Hashimoto as Kuroda
- Sawa Suzuki as Miharu Kimijyo (上条未春 Kimijō Miharu)
- Kazuko Kurosawa
- Daisuke Miyagawa
- Yoichi Nukumizu
- Kyusaku Shimada

== Production ==
=== Music ===
Eiga.com reported on 1 September 2010 that the theme song of the film Ghost: Mouichido Dakishimetai will be the song "Aishiteru" (アイシテル), which is sung by singer Ken Hirai. This song was released as his 33rd single on 10 November 2010. Ken Hirai had previously provided theme songs for films like I Give My First Love to You and Ano Sora wo Oboeteru.
