= Zutto Zutto Tomodachi =

Album by Mana Ashida

Single by Mana Ashida
- B-side: Happy Lucky Go!; Rainbow Picnic
- Released: May 16, 2012
- Recorded: 2012
- Genre: J-pop
- Length: approx. 22 minutes
- Label: Universal Music (UMCA-50015)
- Songwriters: Shingo Asari; Natsumi Watanabe

Mana Ashida singles chronology
"Sutekina Nichiyōbi" (2011)	"Zutto Zutto Tomodachi" (2012)	"Ame ni Negai o" (2012)

"Zutto Zutto Tomodachi" (ずっとずっとトモダチ, lit. Friends Forever and Ever) is the third official single by Japanese child actress and singer Mana Ashida, released on May 16, 2012. This is Ashida's second solo work after Sutekina Nichiyōbi, used as both the opening and ending themes of the Sanrio and Studio Comet anime series Jewelpet Kira Deco! and used as a song to promote the movie Jewelpet the Movie: Sweets Dance Princess. The single reached the 17th position on the Oricon Weekly Singles Charts after its release.

== Production ==
The single was announced on March 16, 2012, and a press conference was held on March 30, 2012 at the Imperial Hotel, Tokyo to promote the film Jewelpet the Movie: Sweets Dance Princess. Mana Ashida and the designer of Hello Kitty Yuko Yamaguchi appeared alongside the guest stars. The single was released in both CD Maxi and CD+DVD versions, which included the video for "Zutto Zutto Tomodachi".

== Track listing ==
All music is composed by Shingo Asari.

No.	Title	Lyrics	Length
1.	"Zutto Zutto Tomodachi" (ずっとずっとトモダチ)	Shingo Asari, Natsumi Watanabe	4:12
2.	"Happy Lucky Go!" (ハッピーラッキー☆ゴー！)	Shingo Asari, Natsumi Watanabe	3:43
3.	"Rainbow Picnic" (なないろピクニック)	Shingo Asari	3:31
4.	"Zutto Zutto Tomodachi (Karaoke)" (ずっとずっとトモダチ(カラオケ))		4:12
5.	"Happy Lucky Go! (Karaoke)" (ハッピーラッキー☆ゴー！(カラオケ))		3:43
6.	"Rainbow Picnic (Karaoke)" (なないろピクニック(カラオケ))		3:30
Total length:			22 minutes
