= Tomoki Okayama =

Japanese actor (born 1996)

- 岡山 智樹
- Born: December 13, 1996 (age 28); Miyazaki Prefecture, Japan
- Occupation: Actor

Tomoki Okayama (岡山 智樹, Okayama Tomoki, born 13 December 1996, in Miyazaki Prefecture, Japan) is a Japanese actor.
