= Marumo no Okite =

- Poster
- Also known as: Marumo
- Genre: Drama
- Created by: Madoka Takiyama (Fuji TV); Ayako Mizuno
- Written by: Tsuyoshi Sakurai; Kumiko Aso
- Directed by: Keita Kono (Kyodo TV); Hidenori Joho; Miyako Yasojima
- Starring: Sadao Abe; Mana Ashida
- Theme music composer: Koji Miyashita
- Ending theme: "Maru Maru Mori Mori!" by Kaoru to Tomoki, Tamani Mook
- Composers: Hiroyuki Sawano; Yutaka Yamada
- Country of origin: Japan
- Original language: Japanese
- No. of seasons: 1
- No. of episodes: 11

Production
- Producer: Fumi Hashimono (Kyodo TV)
- Cinematography: Seiichi Ito
- Camera setup: Multi-camera
- Running time: 54 minutes Ep. 1: 20-minute extension Ep. 7: 10-minute extension Ep. 11: 30-minute extension
- Production companies: Fuji TV; Kyodo TV

Original release
- Network: Fuji TV
- Release: April 24 – July 3, 2011

Marumo no Okite (Japanese: マルモのおきて; lit. Marumo's Rule, also known as Marumo's Story) is a Japanese television series which premiered on Fuji TV on April 24, 2011. This television series stars Sadao Abe as Mamoru Takagi, a public relations officer with a stationery company. It also stars child actor Fuku Suzuki and child actress Mana Ashida as Mamoru's late friend Jun-ichiro's twin children.

The television series was broadcast as part of the Fuji TV's Dramatic Sunday time slot, which airs every Sunday from 9 pm to 9:54 pm.

== Plot ==
Mamoru Takagi's best friend, Jun-ichiro Sasakura, suddenly dies from cancer, leaving behind his twin children, Kaoru and Tomoki. The children's mother had abandoned them when they were young, and they had no other dependents left. The twins' relatives argue over who will take responsibility for them. In the end, the twins are separated. However, the twins are extremely close, and both run away from their respective foster families. Marumo manages to find them, and after a brief struggle to bring them back, Marumo gives in and agrees that the twins can stay with him. Along the way back, a dog, which has been following Tomoki, follows them back to Marumo's house.

Marumo has no parenting experience, but he makes a great parent. He manages to care for the twins, together with the help of his landlord and the landlord's daughter. Over time, they face many challenges, with Marumo trying hard to balance his time between his work and taking care of the twins.

== Cast ==
=== Takagi's household ===
- Sadao Abe as Mamoru Takagi (高木 護; 38, nicknamed "Marumo")

Marumo is a single man working in the customer service center at a leading stationery manufacturer, "Akebono Stationery Company". The young Mamoru was played by Takanori Shimizu.

- Mana Ashida as Kaoru Sasakura (笹倉 薫; 6→7, Jun-ichiro Sasakura's daughter, a twin older sister)
- Fuku Suzuki as Tomoki Sasakura (笹倉 友樹; 6→7, Jun-ichiro Sasakura's son, a twin younger brother)
- Mook (ムック; Miniature Schnauzer, voiced by Ryo Oka)

=== Izakaya "Kujira" ===
- Masanori Sera as Yosuke Hatanaka (畑中 陽介; 50, the master of the izakaya "Kujira" and the owner of Marumo's apartment)
- Manami Higa as Aya Hatanaka (畑中 彩; 25, Yosuke's daughter)

=== Akebono Stationery Company ===
- Masato Ibu as
- Saori Takizawa as Kana Makimura (牧村 かな; 30, Public Relations Department)
- Yu Koyanagi as Takanori Mashima (真島 孝則; 25, customer care center)
- Masako Chiba as Tamiko Shiozawa (塩沢 民子; 45, customer care center)
- Erica Tonooka (Idoling!!!) as Rinka Ozaki (尾崎 凛花; 22, a temp for the customer care center)
- Hiroyuki Yamamoto as Yusaku Ando (安藤 祐作; customer care center)
- Tomohiro Ogawa as Ryohei Shinohara (篠原 良平; customer care center)
- Nobuaki Mitsuda as Shuichi Nakanishi (中西 修一; customer care center)

=== Hirokawa Elementary School, Sumida ===
- Shinji Rokkaku as Hideo Sugishita (杉下 秀男; Kaoru and Tomoki's teacher (Class 1 of the 1st grade))

Class 1 of the 1st grade
- Yasunari Kijima as Hayato Taniguchi (谷口 隼人)
- Miyu Honda as Manami Endo (遠藤 まなみ)
and others

=== Others ===
- Shingo Katsurayama as Jun-ichiro Sasakura (笹倉 純一郎; Marumo's best friend, Kaoru and Tomoki's father, dies of cancer at age 38)

His childhood version was played by Junki Shimoda.

- Satoshi Nikaido as Akihito Sasakura (笹倉 秋人; Jun-ichiro's elder brother, Kaoru and Tomoki's uncle, Episodes 1, 2, 6 and 7)
- Kyoko Maya as Setsuko Takagi (高木 節子; Marumo's mother, Episode 5)
- Mayu Tsuruta as Ayumi Aoki (青木 あゆみ; Jun-ichiro's ex-wife, Kaoru and Tomoki's mother, Episodes 7, 9, 10 and 11)
- Miyoko Yoshimoto as Sakurako Shirokawa (白川 桜子; a psychiatrist at Shirokawa Mental Clinic, Episode 2, 3, 4 and 5)
- Kazuya Kojima (UN-JASH) as Ryoichi Chiba (千葉 亮一; a police officer at Sumida Police Station Hirokawa Police Box, Episodes 2, 7 and 9)
- Koutaro Tanaka as Tatsuya (達也; Aya Hatanaka's ex-husband, Episode 9)

== Production ==
Marumo no Okite was first announced by Fuji TV on February 25, 2011. Apparently the name "Marumo" comes from the children's mispronunciation of Mamoru's name. "Okite" in this context means a promise or agreement in the Japanese language.

This television series will star actor Sadao Abe, child actor Fuku Suzuki, and child actress Mana Ashida. Sadao Abe will play Mamoru Takagi, a single man who is an employee at a stationery maker. He said that he had "suddenly become a father on Sunday nights" and that he looked forward to his role in this series. Actress Mana Ashida previously made headlines in Japan for being the youngest lead star in a Japanese television drama when she starred in a NTV 2-hour long special, Sayonara Bokutachi no Youchien. She is also noted for her role in the 2009 television series Mother. This will be her first lead role in a Japanese television series. Together with child actor Suzuki Fuku, they will play Mamoru's deceased friend's twin children.

On April 4, 2011, it was announced that Mana Ashida and her co-star Fuku Suzuki would team up to produce tdrama's theme song in their debut as singers. The duo will release the song under the temporary banner of Kaoru to Tomoki, Tamani Mook (薫と友樹、たまにムック, Kaoru to Tomoki, tama ni mukku). This theme song was entitled Maru Maru Mori Mori! (マル・マル・モリ・モリ!), and it will include sections where the talking dog, Mook, will sing. The song takes its name from the fact that Ashida will play the character Kaoru, while Suzuki will play the character named Tomoki. The Mook is from the talking dog's name. Hamada Miwako, the choreographer for the hit song Gake no Ue no Ponyo was the song's choreographer. The single album for the song Maru Maru Mori Mori! was released on May 25.

Ryo Oka also voiced the talking dog, Mook.

In the last episode of Marumo no Okite, it was revealed that the show would have a special program but that the program's broadcast date was unconfirmed. Later, on September 2, Fuji TV announced that the program would be aired on October 9, 2011.

== Broadcast ==
Marumo no Okite was aired in the Fuji Television's Dramatic Sunday television drama time slot, which is aired on Sundays, 9pm to 9:54 pm. The series debuted on April 24, 2011, and its first episode was extended by 20 minutes. The seventh episode was extended by ten minutes.

The last episode of this series was extended by 30 minutes. Before the airing of this episode, a special program entitled Naite Waratte 2-jikan Marumaru! Genki Mori Mori Special (泣いて笑って2時間マルマル!元気モリモリSP) was aired. The program was hosted by the lead stars Mana Ashida and Fuku Suzuki. The last episode also featured a special guest appearance by AKB48 member Atsuko Maeda, who would be starring as Mizuki Ashiya in the following television series Hanazakari no Kimitachi e -Ikemen Paradice-2011.

On September 2, 2011, it was announced that the Marumo no Okite SP would air on October 9, 2011, at 9 pm on Fuji TV. The show retained its main cast and was a two-hour long special program.

The series made a return in 2014, showing the life of the twins four years after the main series. In 2016, Television Jamaica acquired broadcast rights to the drama and began airing it on the Caribbean island of Jamaica (its only operative territory) in English audio.

=== Episodes ===
	Episode title	Romanized title	Translation of title	Broadcast date	Ratings
Ep. 1	独身男と双子が家族!? 犬がつなげた絆	Dokushin otoko to futago ga kazoku!?-Inu ga tsunageta kizuna	A Single man and a Pair of Twins Make a Family!? The Bond a Dog Made	April 24, 2011	11.6%
Ep. 2	今日からここがおまえらの家	Kyō kara koko ga omae-ra no ie	From Today, This Will be You Guys Home	May 1, 2011	12.9%
Ep. 3	入学式、マルモは来ないの?	Nyūgaku-shiki, marumo wa konai no?	Marumo's Not Coming to our School Opening Ceremony?	May 8, 2011	12.3%
Ep. 4	マルモがいない夜に大事件!!	Marumo ga inai yoru ni dai jiken!!	Big Happenings on Marumo's Night Out!!	May 15, 2011	12.7%
Ep. 5	母ちゃんが双子を返せって…	Kāchan ga futago o kaesette…	Mom Says, Give Up the Twins…	May 22, 2011	15.6%
Ep. 6	マルモの顔なんて見たくない	Marumo no kao nante mitakunai	Marumo, I Don't Even Want to See Your Face	May 29, 2011	15.6%
Ep. 7	双子の実母、ついに現る! 涙のお誕生日パーティー	Futago no jitsubo, tsuini genru! Namida no o tanjō-bi pātī	The Mother of the Twins Revealed at Last! A Birthday Party in Tears	June 5, 2011	16.1%
Ep. 8	双子がいたら恋はできない?	Futago ga itara koi wa dekinai?	Do the Twins Stop Me Falling in Love?	June 12, 2011	16.8%
Ep. 9	オレ、薫に手上げちゃった	Ore, Kaoru ni te age chatta	I Raised My Hand to Kaoru	June 19, 2011	17.2%
Ep. 10	おばちゃんは、ママですか?	Oba-chan wa, mamadesu ka?	Is "Auntie" Our Mama?	June 26, 2011	15.6%
Ep. 11	おきてを守ったから ずっと楽しかったよ。 マルモありがとう、 そしてさようなら	Okite o mamottakara zutto tanoshikatta yo. Marumo arigatō, soshite sayōnara	Your Rules Kept Us Safe and Made Every Day Fun; Thank you, Marumo, and Good-Bye.	July 3, 2011	23.9%
Ratings for Kanto region (average rating: 15.48%)
Special 1	マルモのおきてスペシャル 薫と友樹、友だちの願いをかなえるために カッパさがしの大冒険 マルモがいつか結婚して子どもができても、 薫と友樹のことをずっと好きでいてね	Marumo no okite supesharu Kaoru to Tomoki, tomodachi no negai o kanaeru tame ni Kappa sagashi no dai bōken Marumo ga itsuka kekkon shite kodomo ga dekite mo, Kaoru to Tomoki no koto o zutto sukide ite ne	The Law of Marumo Special: Kaoru and Tomoki, In Answer a Friend's Prayer; Have an Adventure Searching for Kappa. Even When Marumo Marries and has Kids; He'll Always Love Kaoru and Tomoki	October 9, 2011	16.7%
Special 2	3年ぶりに帰ってきたよ! 双子の夢と初恋にしゃべる犬… 2人の成長を見守るマルモの決断は? でもマルモは本当のパパじゃないんだよ?	3-Nen-buri ni kaettekita yo! Futago no yume to hatsukoi ni shaberu inu... 2-Ri no seichō o mimamoru Marumo no ketsudan wa? Demo Marumo wa hontō no papa janai nda yo?	Return after 3 years! The dog speaks of the twin's dreams and first love Mamoru's decision to watch the two children growth process? But Marumo is not their real dad!?	September 28, 2014	12.9%

== Reception ==
Marumo no Okite was scheduled for the same time slot as the much anticipated television drama JIN 2 that is shown during TBS Sunday's 9:00 pm Drama slot. However, Asahi Shimbun reported on June 7, 2011, that Marumo no Okite managed to get within a 2.6% rating difference. Later, the seventh episode ratings crossed the 20% mark, reaching a high of 21.1%, which rivaled JIN 2's peak of 23.7%. On the same day, JIN 2 posted an average rating of 18.7%, and viewership peaked at 21.5%.

Marumo no Okite debuted with an average rating of 11.6% for its first episode. Viewership in Sendai (Sendai TV) reached a high of 17.2% in that episode. Later, the drama's seventh episode managed to garner an average rating of 16.1% in the Kantō region (Fuji TV). During that episode, the viewership peaked briefly at 9:57 pm with a rating of 21.1%, marking the first time the drama has crossed the 20% mark.

Marumo no Okite's final episode garnered a 23.9% rating in the Kantō region and a rating of 20.6% in the Kansai Region (Kansai TV). The viewership rating peaked at 27.5% during the time period from 10:14 pm to 10:16 pm. The average rating of this episode was 6.7 percentage points more than the previous record set by the eighth episode.

Actress Mana Ashida received the "Best Performance by an Actress" award at the 2011 Tokyo Drama Awards for her role in Marumo no Okite. She shared this award with actress Kyōka Suzuki, who won the award for her role in the NHK television series Second Virgin.

== Soundtrack ==
=== Original Soundtrack album ===
Marumo no Okite Original Soundtrack

Soundtrack album by Hiroyuki Sawano and Yutaka Yamada
- Released: June 1, 2011
- Genre: Soundtrack
- Length: 74:30
- Label: Pony Canyon

The Fuji Television Serial Drama "Marumo no Okite" Original Soundtrack (フジテレビ系ドラマ「マルモのおきて」 オリジナル・サウンドトラック) was released on June 1, 2011, by Pony Canyon. It was released in CD format, and it contains 75 minutes worth of soundtracks.

==== Track listing ====
No.	Title	Music	Length
1.	"ramdom-E"	Hiroyuki Sawano	5:16
2.	"The Beginning of a Beginning" (はじまりのはじまり)	Yutaka Yamada	3:07
3.	"The Noisy Breakfast" (どたばたあさごはん)	Yutaka Yamada	2:58
4.	"The Warmth of a Family" (かぞくのぬくもり)	Yutaka Yamada	4:48
5.	"Let's Go and Play!" (あそびにいこうよ)	Yutaka Yamada	3:00
6.	"Memories of a Dream" (ゆめのきおく)	Yutaka Yamada	3:12
7.	"I Don't Want to be Alone" (ひとりぼっちはいやだよ)	Yutaka Yamada	2:04
8.	"Dancing the Can-Can Dance and Hopping Round and Round" (ぐるぐるぴょんぴょんけんけんぱ!)	Yutaka Yamada	2:32
9.	"The Things that Happened that Time" (あのときのこと)	Yutaka Yamada	2:19
10.	"Under the Sun" (おひさまのしたで)	Yutaka Yamada	3:08
11.	"Secrets by the Two" (ふたりのひみつ)	Yutaka Yamada	2:46
12.	"ramdom-E<BPM64v>"	Hiroyuki Sawano	6:09
13.	"Akebono Stationery Company" (あけぼのぶんぐ)	Yutaka Yamada	1:50
14.	"Rush Job" (やっつけしごと)	Yutaka Yamada	1:53
15.	"Taihen, Taihen" (たいへんたいへん)	Yutaka Yamada	2:15
16.	"Tekuteku, Tokotoko" (てくてく、とことこ)	Yutaka Yamada	2:14
17.	"Warm Feeling" (やさしいきもち)	Yutaka Yamada	3:27
18.	"A Whole Flower by Marumo" (はなまるまるも)	Yutaka Yamada	2:39
19.	"A Cloudy and Rainy Day" (くもりのちあめ)	Yutaka Yamada	2:16
20.	"Are we Really a Family?" (ほんとのかぞく)	Yutaka Yamada	3:01
21.	"The End of Today" (きょうのおわり)	Yutaka Yamada	4:01
22.	"We Will be Happy Forever" (しあわせはいつも)	Yutaka Yamada	4:22
23.	"Missing Piece" (vocals by mpi)	Hiroyuki Sawano; mpi	5:13
Total length:			74:30

== International Broadcast ==
In Bangladesh, it aired on NTV dubbing in Bangla on every Friday at 9.40 a.m. and beginning December 23, 2016, Friday.

Preceded by School!! (January 16, 2011 – March 20, 2011)	Fuji TV Dramatic Sunday ドラマチック・サンデー; Sundays 21:00 – 21:54 (JST)	Succeeded by Hanazakari no Kimitachi e (10/7/2011 – September 18, 2011)
