= Boy's Abyss =

Japanese manga series

- First tankōbon volume cover, featuring Nagi Aoe

少年のアビス (Shōnen no Abisu)
- Genre: Drama; Psychological; Thriller
- Manga
- Written by: Ryō Minenami
- Published by: Shueisha
- English publisher: NA: Viz Media
- Imprint: Young Jump Comics
- Magazine: Weekly Young Jump
- Original run: February 27, 2020 – July 25, 2024
- Volumes: 18
- Television drama
- Directed by: Misato Kato
- Written by: Kyoko Inukai
- Original network: MBS
- Original run: September 2, 2022 – October 21, 2022
- Episodes: 8
- icon

Boy's Abyss (Japanese: 少年のアビス, Hepburn: Shōnen no Abisu) is a Japanese manga series written and illustrated by Ryō Minenami. It was serialized in Shueisha's seinen manga magazine Weekly Young Jump magazine from February 2020 to July 2024, with its chapters collected in 18 tankōbon volumes. A television drama adaptation aired from September to October 2022.

== Plot ==
Reiji Kurose lives with his brother, his mother, who works as a nurse, and his grandmother in a rural town. He is childhood friends with Sakuko Akiyama. One day, Reiji meets Nagi Aoe, a member of the idol group Acrylic who is working as a convenience store clerk. Nagi tells Reiji of a place in the town known as the "Lover's Abyss", which is claimed to be a place where lovers commit suicide. Reiji and Nagi attempt suicide but fail, and Reiji is rescued by his teacher Yuri Shibasawa, who then vows to protect him.

== Characters ==
Reiji Kurose (黒瀬 令児, Kurose Reiji)
Portrayed by: Towa Araki
The main character, who plans on leaving the town but is conflicted by the circumstances he is facing. He considers going to university in Tokyo.
Nagi Aoe (青江 ナギ, Aoe Nagi)
Portrayed by: Hinako Kitano
A member of the idol group Acrylic, who had gone on hiatus and moved to Reiji's town, where she works as a convenience store clerk. She is married to Kosaku Esemori. Following her suicide attempt, she quits her job and returns to Tokyo to resume her idol activities.
Sakuko Akiyama (秋山 朔子, Akiyama Sakuko)
Portrayed by: Miyu Honda
Reiji's childhood friend who studies at a private all-girls' school and is aiming to go to university in Tokyo. She wants to be an author, in particular admiring Esemori's work, and is a fan of the idol group Acrylic. She is nicknamed Chako (チャコ) due to her chubby looks. She offers to be Esemori's editor but later ends the agreement after he attempted to sexually harass her.
Yuri Shibasawa (柴沢 由里, Shibasawa Yuri)
Voiced by: Yoko Hikasa (PV)
Portrayed by: Rena Matsui
Reiji's teacher who appears to have developed feelings for him and wishes to protect him, to the point of letting him stay at her house. She was a table tennis champion during her high school years.
Gen Minegishi (峯岸 玄, Minegishi Gen)
Portrayed by: Natsuki Hori
Reiji and Sakuko's childhood friend, whose family owns and operates a construction company.
Yuko Kurose (黒瀬 夕子, Kurose Yūko)
Portrayed by: Reiko Kataoka
Reiji's mother, who works as a nurse at the local hospital. She separated from Reiji's father prior to the events of the series, and is secretly having sex with Gen's father. She went to the same high school as Esemori and is implied to have had a romantic relationship with him.
Kosaku Esemori (似非森 耕作, Esemori Kōsaku)
Portrayed by: Sōkō Wada
A popular author and Nagi's husband, who moved back to his hometown to take care of his mother. He is implied to have had a romantic relationship with Yuko, who went to the same school as him. His real name is Akira Nozoe (野添 旭, Nozoe Akira).

== Media ==
=== Manga ===
Written and illustrated by Ryō Minenami, Boy's Abyss was serialized in Shueisha's seinen manga magazine Weekly Young Jump magazine from February 27, 2020, to July 25, 2024. Shueisha collected its chapters in eighteen tankōbon volumes, released from July 17, 2020, to October 18, 2024.

In June 2022, Viz Media announced that they licensed the series for English publication.

=== Drama ===
A television drama adaptation was announced in July 2022. It was directed by Misato Kato with scripts by Kyoko Inukai and Towa Araki performing the lead role. The series aired for eight episodes on MBS's Drama Tokku programming block from September 2 to October 21, 2022. (Note: MBS listed the series' air dates on Thursday at 24:59, which is Friday at 12:59 a.m. JST.) RIM performed the opening theme "Inner Child" (インナアチャイルド, In'nāchairudo), while SpendyMily performed the ending theme "Iris".

== Reception ==
In 2021, the series was placed eleventh in the 7th Next Manga Award in the print category. By July 2022, the series has over one million copies in circulation.

== See also ==
- Hatsukoi Zombie, another manga series by the same author
