= Fuku Suzuki =

Japanese actor from Tokyo (born 2004)

- 鈴木 福
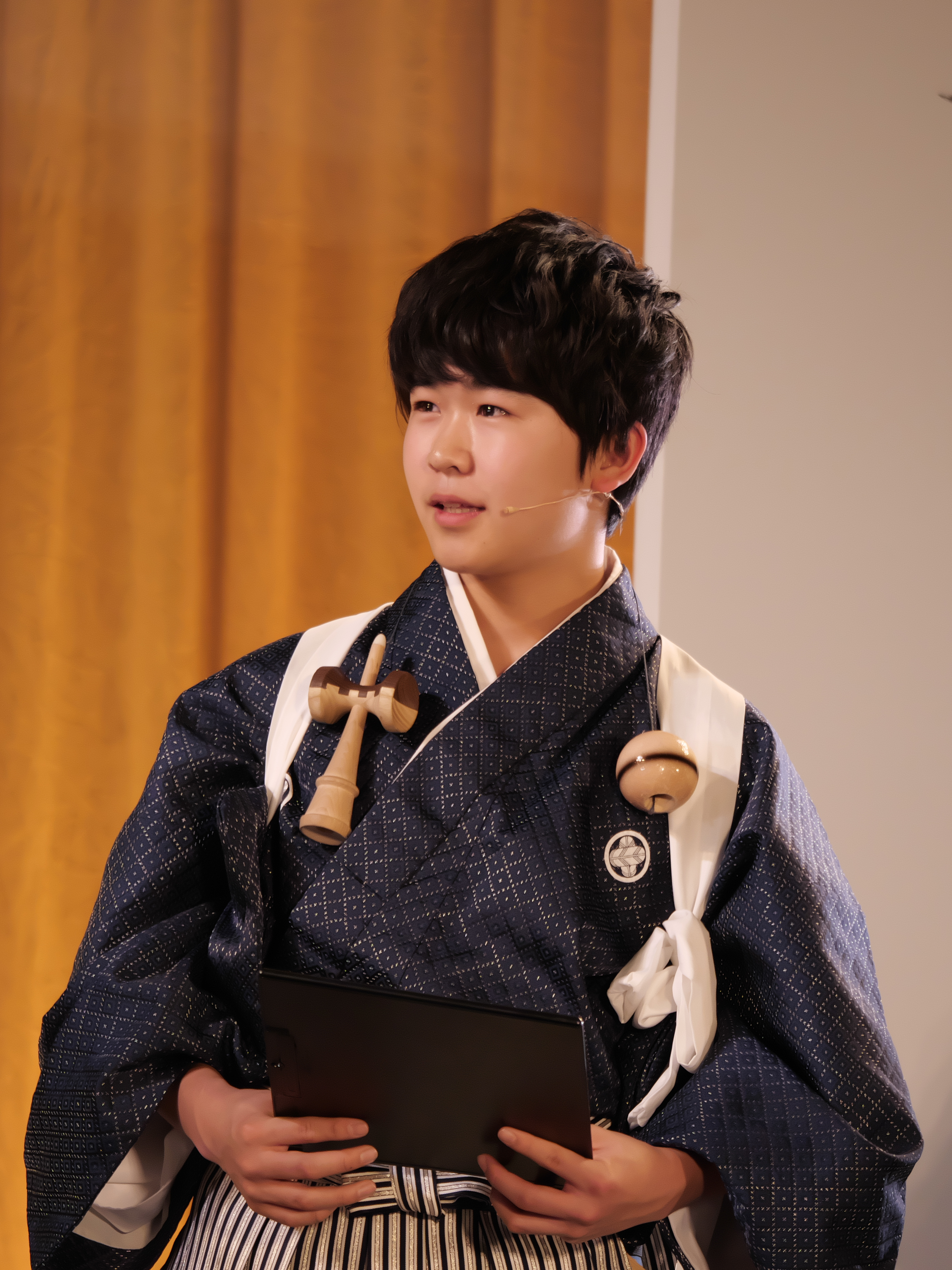
- Suzuki in 2020
- Born: June 17, 2004 (age 21); Tokyo, Japan
- Occupation: Actor
- Years active: 2006–present
- Agent: Theatre Entertainment
- Notable work: TV dramas Marumo no Okite (2011); Yōkai Ningen Bem (2011); Kodomo Keisatsu (2012) Filmed works Kodomo Keisatsu (2013) Singles; Maru Maru Mori Mori! (2011)
- Awards: Details

Fuku Suzuki (鈴木 福, Suzuki Fuku; born 17 June 2004) is a Japanese actor from Tokyo. A member of the talent agency Theatre Academy, he made his first appearance in 2006 on the NHK children's programme Inai Inai Baa! before earning a major role in Marumo no Okite and more recently the lead role in the television drama and film Kodomo Keisatsu. Suzuki has also featured as a tarento in various variety and quiz shows, most notably Waratte Iitomo! where he was a "holiday regular". His younger sister, Yume Suzuki, is also a child actress.

As a singer, Suzuki is most famous for his 2011 collaboration with child actress Mana Ashida under the name "Kaoru to Tomoki, Tamani Mook". The duo released the hit single "Maru Maru Mori Mori!" which earned them a place on the music show Kōhaku Uta Gassen and the Special Award at the 53rd Japan Record Awards.

== Career in television and film ==
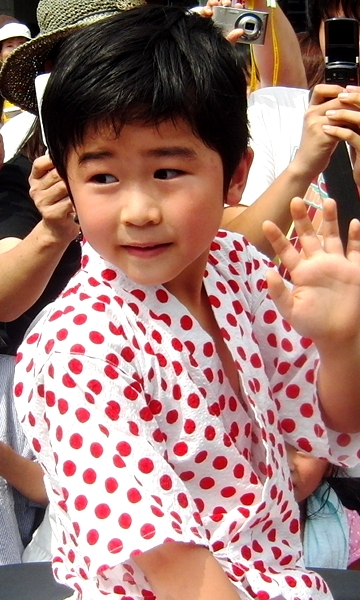
Suzuki in 2011 at Nagaoka Matsuri, Nagaoka, Niigata.

=== Child actor and presenter ===
Suzuki made his first television appearance in 2006 as a toddler on the NHK preschool children's programme Inai Inai Baa! before making minor appearances (largely as children during flashbacks of protagonists) on works such as: the 2009 police procedural "Keikan no Chi" (as Tamio) and the 2010 asadora "GeGeGe no Nyōbō" (as Takashi). He gained a more prominent role playing Tomoya Yusa, the protagonist's son, in the 2010 film "A Boy and His Samurai".

By 2011, Suzuki was playing a major role as Tomoki Sasakura in the Fuji TV television drama series Marumo no Okite. Despite a poor ratings share of 11.6% for the initial episode, the final episode gained an average audience share of 23.9%. The final audience share made the episode one of the most watched drama episodes of the year, second in the first seven months only to Jin. Sports Nippon claimed that poor expectations for the programme due to the young cast as the reason for the initial low figures, though it concluded that ultimately the popularity of Suzuki and his co-star Mana Ashida were responsible for the show's success, especially after the theme song, performed by Ashida and Suzuki, reached number 3 on the Oricon weekly singles chart. The popularity of the pairing led to a two-hour special, hosted by the pair, to be broadcast directly after the final episode. Oricon, however, stressed that the pairing was not the sole reason for the show's success, noting that the well-crafted screenplay was also pivotal. The success of the series led to a special being broadcast on October 9, 2011, which achieved an audience share of 16.7%. An additional special was commissioned in 2014 and will be broadcast on September 28, 2014. An emoticon featuring Suzuki's character was created to promote the episode on the messaging service Line.

In 2011, Suzuki played the supernatural being Bero in Nippon Television's television drama adaptation of Yōkai Ningen Bem, a role for which he earned the Supporting Actor Award at the 15th Nikkan Sports⋅Drama Grand Prix. Suzuki was not only the youngest recipient of the award but also the first child actor to be awarded at the Nikkan Sports⋅Drama Grand Prix. Asahi Shimbun notes that Suzuki's success in the role was due to his efforts in basing his portrayal of Bero around the animated version of the film and his ability to convey affection whilst portraying the supernatural being.

In March 2012, Suzuki featured as a guest voice actor on the animated Doraemon film "Doraemon: Nobita and the Island of Miracles—Animal Adventure". Suzuki provided the voice for "Fūku", a seven-year-old boy who enjoyed going about his life at his own pace and was based on Suzuki himself. Suzuki described being cast in the role, which made him the youngest voice actor of Doraemon's thirty-two films, as a "pleasing yet unexpected surprise". His collaboration with Doraemon was extended to Asahi TV's animated television version when, in April 2012, Suzuki and his sister, Yume Suzuki, became regulars on a section entitled "A Box Project, 100 years After the Start of Doraemon". The siblings appear once a month on the section in a hosting role as so-called "Navigators" and is the first programme where the siblings appear together as regulars.

Together with his childhood friend Kanon Tani, Suzuki became the presenter of the children's television show "be Ponkikkīzu" which was first broadcast on the satellite channel "BS Fuji TV" in April 2012. The selection was seen as an experiment given the fact that show had traditionally been presented by established adult acts such as Bakushō Mondai. As a consequence, the pair became the first child presenters of a "Ponkikkīzu" show in its thirty-nine year history. After the announcement that he had been appointed as co-host, Suzuki commented that he was "looking forward to joining forces with his childhood friend and would try his best". As of September 2013, the pair continue to host the programme, which is now broadcast daily having previously only been broadcast on weekdays. A "Ponkikkīzu" DVD box-set is expected to be released in October to coincide with its fortieth anniversary.

Also in April 2012, Suzuki began playing the lead role in the late-night TBS Drama, Kodomo Keisatsu (literally "Child Police"), where he portrayed Shigeru Ōnuma, a fifty-year-old police chief who, along with the rest of his police force, had been transformed back into a child. Despite criticism regarding the use of child actors for a late night programme, the success of the series led to the release of a film of the same name in March 2013. The film débuted at number eleven on Japan's box office rankings and a DVD, which was released on September 4, 2013, débuted at number 48 on the Oricon weekly DVD chart. A spin-off series entitled "Kodomo Keishi" (literally "Child Police Superintendent") began broadcasting in January 2013, in which Suzuki plays a minor role as his original character. Mainichi Shimbun cites the starring of Suzuki as the lead character in Kodomo Keisatsu as the reason for the continued popularity of the series.

In late 2013, Suzuki began featuring alongside Haruna Kawaguchi, Sawa Suzuki and Seiichi Tanabe on the drama "Otto no Kanojo" (夫のカノジョ) (literally, "The Husband's Lover") where he portrayed one of two children, Masato Komatsubara, in a dysfunctional family. The first episode aired on October 24, 2013, in Tokyo Broadcasting System's Thursday nine o'clock slot and received 4.7% of the audience share. In subsequent episodes, the drama performed less well in terms of ratings and was consequently cut short to eight episodes; its average audience share of 3.87% was the lowest of any prime-time drama series to be broadcast in the 21st century on Japanese commercial television.

Suzuki featured in the 2014 film, "Akumu-chan the movie", reprising the role of Ryū Uehara having previously made a guest appearance for the fifth episode of the television programme of the same name. In his second film role of 2014, Suzuki featured in "Bara Iro no Būko", a film featuring Riho Sayashi directed by the director of Kodomo Keisatsu, Yūichi Fukuda.

=== Other television appearances ===
==== Variety and quiz shows ====
Suzuki was a regular member of the variety show Waratte Iitomo, where he became a "holiday regular" in April 2012. The title "holiday regular" is a reference to the fact that he only makes appearances during school and national holidays. Upon joining the show, he expressed his excitement in being "able to meet a variety of people". As part of a 2013 Beat Takeshi variety show, Suzuki was sent to France along with Junji Takada to capture The Louvre from a child's perspective. The pairing was described by Oricon as being "distinctive". Suzuki has also appeared as a guest on several other variety and quiz shows, including: "Takarasagashi Adventure Nazo-toki Battle Tore!" (2012), "Downtown DX" (2012) and "Bakushō! Dai-Nippon Akan Keisatsu" (2013).

==== Talk shows ====
Suzuki has made occasional guest appearances on talk shows; most notably Suzuki became the focus the 37th anniversary of the talk show "Tetsuko no Heya" in February 2012. On the programme Suzuki discussed his New Year's break, his relationship with his sister and his interest in Kamen Rider with the host, Tetsuko Kuroyanagi.

=== Advertising and sponsorships ===
Supermarket chain Itō-Yōkadō featured Suzuki together with "Marumo no Okite" co-star Mana Ashida on several of their television advertisements in 2011. In 2012, he featured (along with his sister) on a Toyota Sienta advertisement in April entitled "strange face", followed by an advertisement in August for a wedding magazine "Zexy" with Tetsuko Kuroyanagi, whose long-running show he had featured on earlier that year. Suzuki has also featured on several solo advertisements, including one for life insurance firm "Medicare Life" in 2011 and another for banana brand "Sumifru" in 2012. As of 2013, Suzuki continues to be featured in Itō-Yōkadō advertisements, having also made appearances for: Asahi Soft Drinks, Benesse, Kracie Foods and Megmilk Snow Brand.

== Music career ==
In May 2011, Suzuki made his music début when he and Mana Ashida formed the music group "Kaoru to Tomoki, Tamani Mook" where they released the theme song to Marumo no Okite, Maru Maru Mori Mori! (マル・マル・モリ・モリ!), as a single under the music label Universal Music Japan. The single proved highly popular achieving number 3 in its first week of sales on the Oricon weekly chart, a feat which made the pair the youngest group to reach the top ten of the chart. The single retained its place in the top ten for twelve consecutive weeks and achieved number 1 on the 2011 truetone digital track chart. The song later received the Special Award at the 53rd Japan Record Awards and was certified a double platinum ringtone by the Recording Industry Association of Japan, whilst the group earned both the newcomer and special awards at the 44th Japan Cable Awards. Suzuki and Ashida also performed the single at the 62nd edition of the prestigious music show Kōhaku Uta Gassen. As a consequence of being born six days earlier than Ashida, Suzuki became the second youngest performer ever to feature on the programme. As of September 2014, the single has sold over 800,000 physical and over 5 million digital copies.

Following Suzuki's success with "Maru Maru Mori Mori!", he released his first single as a solo artist entitled "Iya, Iya YO~" (イヤイヤYO〜!!) in December 2012 under the Universal Music Japan label. Suzuki promoted the song in front of three hundred fans at an event space in Shinjuku during the week of the song's release. Despite his performance being described as "ten times better than expected" by the song's writer Miruno Komorita, the song was less successful than his collaboration with Ashida, peaking at number 32 on the Oricon weekly chart.

In 2013, Fuku collaborated with "be Ponkikkīzu" co-presenter Kanon Tani forming the group "Fuku to Kanon". In February 2013 the single "Neko Nyan-nyan-nyan Inu Wan-wan-wan Kaeru mo Ahiru mo Gā-gā-gā" (ネコニャンニャンニャン イヌワンワンワン カエルもアヒルもガーガーガー) was released in two versions entitled East and West which peaked at 111 and 153 on the Oricon weekly chart respectively. The two versions differ in the fact that in the East version, Suzuki begins the song in the standard Japanese language (largely spoken in Tokyo or "East" Japan) whereas in the West version Kanon begins the song in the Western Kansai dialect.

In September 2014, a new version of "Maru Maru Mori Mori!" (entitled "Maru Maru Mori Mori! 2014") was announced as a tie-in to a special broadcast of "Marumo no Okite". The single was released on 24 September 2014.

== Personal life ==
=== Family ===
Suzuki is the eldest of four siblings. He has a sister, child actress Yume Suzuki (born 2006), a brother, child actor Tano Suzuki (born 2013), and another sister, Homa Suzuki (born 2015).

=== Hobbies and interests ===
Suzuki describes his specialist skill as his ability to play the koto and claims that his hobby is watching films; in particular he enjoys action films noting that he himself wants to be an actor famous for his roles in such films. This interest in action films can also be seen in his enthusiasm for Kamen Rider; Suzuki is said to enjoy acting out scenes from the science fiction manga in his spare time. Suzuki has shown interest in ghosts (yōkai) and films which contain them, explaining that at the age of four he was renting films such as the animated version of "GeGeGe no Kitarō". His interest in the supernatural is said to be a reason for his success in the role of "Bero" in Yōkai Ningen Bem. He also expressed his love of the animation Doraemon following his voice acting and presenting role on one of the show's mini-sections.

=== Health ===
Suzuki has suffered from hay fever since the age of three and has the motor speech disorder dysarthria.

== Discography ==
=== Singles ===
Year	No.	Title	Notes	Peak chart position		
Year	No.	Title	Notes	Oricon Weekly Singles Chart	Billboard Japan Hot 100	RIAJ Digital Track Chart
2011	1	"Maru Maru Mori Mori!"	Collaboration with Mana Ashida as "Kaoru to Tomoki, Tamani Mook"; theme song of drama Marumo no Okite	2	2	1 (Note: Number one in 2011 for the three non-consecutive weeks ending on: May 24, June 14 and June 21.)
2012	2	"Iya, Iya YO~"		32	— (Note: Charted at number 34 on the Billboard Japan "Hot Singles Sales" chart.)	chart discontinued
2013	3	"Neko Nyan-nyan-nyan Inu Wan-wan-wan Kaeru mo Ahiru mo Gā-gā-gā ~East-hen~"	Collaboration with Kanon Tani as "Fuku to Kanon"	111	—	chart discontinued
2013	4	"Neko Nyan-nyan-nyan Inu Wan-wan-wan Kaeru mo Ahiru mo Gā-gā-gā ~West-hen~"	Collaboration with Kanon Tani as "Fuku to Kanon"	153	—	chart discontinued
2014	5	"Maru Maru Mori Mori! 2014"	Collaboration with Mana Ashida as "Kaoru to Tomoki, Tamani Mook"; theme song of drama Marumo no Okite	—	—	—
"—" denotes a release that did not chart or is yet to be released.

== Filmography ==
=== Film ===
Year	Title	Role	Notes	Ref.
2010	Golden Slumber	Tatsumi Tsuruta		
2010	A Boy and His Samurai	Tomoya Yusa		
2010	Inu to Anata no Monogatari, Inu no Eiga	An unnamed boy		
2010	Ōkike no Tanoshii Ryokō: Shin-kon Jigoku-hen	An unnamed brother		
2012	Doraemon: Nobita and the Island of Miracles—Animal Adventure	Fūku	Voice actor	
2012	Yōkai Ningen Bem	Bero		
2013	Kodomo Keisatsu	Shigeru Ōnuma	Lead role	
2014	Akumu-chan The Movie	Ryū Uehara		
2014	Bara Iro no Būko	An unnamed boy		
2017	Mixed Doubles	Takeru Gotōda		
2019	The 47 Ronin in Debt	Ōishi Chikara		
2021	Zokki			
2021	Saber + Zenkaiger: Super Hero Senki	Shotaro Ishinomori		
2022	Kappei	Takechi		
2025	Re/Member: The Last Night	Yamato Tanabe		
2026	Mag Mag	Shunsuke Oishi		
2026	Higuma!! The Killer Bear	Osanai	Lead role	

=== Television ===
Year	Title	Role	Notes	Ref.
2009	Keikan no Chi	Tamio (as a child)	Uncredited	
2010	GeGeGe no Nyōbō	Takashi (as a child)	Uncredited; Asadora	
2010	Daimajin Kanon	Shōta		
2011	Marumo no Okite	Tomoki Sasakura	Special broadcast on October 9, 2011	
2011	Another face Keiji-Sōmuka Ōtomo Tetsu	Yūto Ōtomo		
2011	Hanazakari no Kimitachi e	Tomoki Sasakura	First episode cameo	
2011	Yōkai Ningen Bem	Bero		
2011	62nd NHK Kōhaku Uta Gassen	Performer	As part of "Kaoru to Tomoki, Tamani Mook"	
2012	Waratte Iitomo	Holiday regular		
2012	Be Ponkikkīzu	Presenter		
2012	Blackboard-jidai to Tatakatta Kyōshi-tachi	Ryū Shirahama		
2012	Kodomo Keisatsu	Shigeru Ōnuma		
2012	Doraemon	Navigator		
2012	Ikkyū-san	Ikkyū	Drama adaptation special	
2012	Kuruma Isu de Boku wa Sora o Tobu	Daisuke Ishii		
2012	Akumu-chan	Ryū Uehara	Guest for episode five	
2013	Kodomo Keishi	Shigeru Ōnuma		
2013	Share House no Koibito	Masaru Fukui	Guest for episode four	
2013	Onna Nobunaga	Takechiyo		
2013	Ikkyū-san 2	Ikkyū		
2013	Another face Keiji-Sōmuka Ōtomo Tetsu 2	Yūto Ōtomo		
2013	Nikai ga Kowai	Ryū Hatano	As part of "Hontō ni Atta Kowai Hanashi"	
2013	Otto no Kanojo	Masato Komatsubara		
2014	Miyamoto Musashi	Iori		
2014	Keiji 110 Kilo	Mitsuru Aizawa		
2017	Warotenka	Young Fūta Takei	Asadora	
2020	Utsubyō 9dan	Sōta Fujii	TV movie	
2022–23	Kamen Rider Geats	Ziin/Kamen Rider Ziin		
2024	Ooku	Tokugawa Ienari	Appearance in the last episode	

=== Dubbing roles ===
Year	Title	Role	Notes	References
2011	Happy Feet Two	Erik		
2015	The Peanuts Movie	Charlie Brown		
2022	Strange World	Ethan Clade		
2024	The Wild Robot	Brightbill		

== Awards ==
=== 2011 ===
- 53rd Japan Record Awards: Special Award for "Maru Maru Mori Mori!"
- 4th Parenting Awards: Kids Category
- 44th Japan Cable Awards: Newcomer for "Kaoru to Tomoki, Tamani Mook"
- 44th Japan Cable Awards: Special Award for "Kaoru to Tomoki, Tamani Mook"

=== 2012 ===
- 26th Japan Gold Disc Awards: Top Five New Artists for "Kaoru to Tomoki, Tamani Mook"
- 26th Japan Gold Disc Awards: Top Five Songs by Digital Download for "Maru Maru Mori Mori!"
- 15th Nikkan Sports⋅Drama Grand Prix: Supporting Actor Award for "Bero" in "Yōkai Ningen Bem"

=== 2013 ===
- The Fantastic Fest 2013: GUTBUSTER COMEDY FEATURES Best Actor in "Kodomo Keisatsu"
