= Mana Ashida =

Japanese actress and singer (born 2004)

- 芦田 愛菜
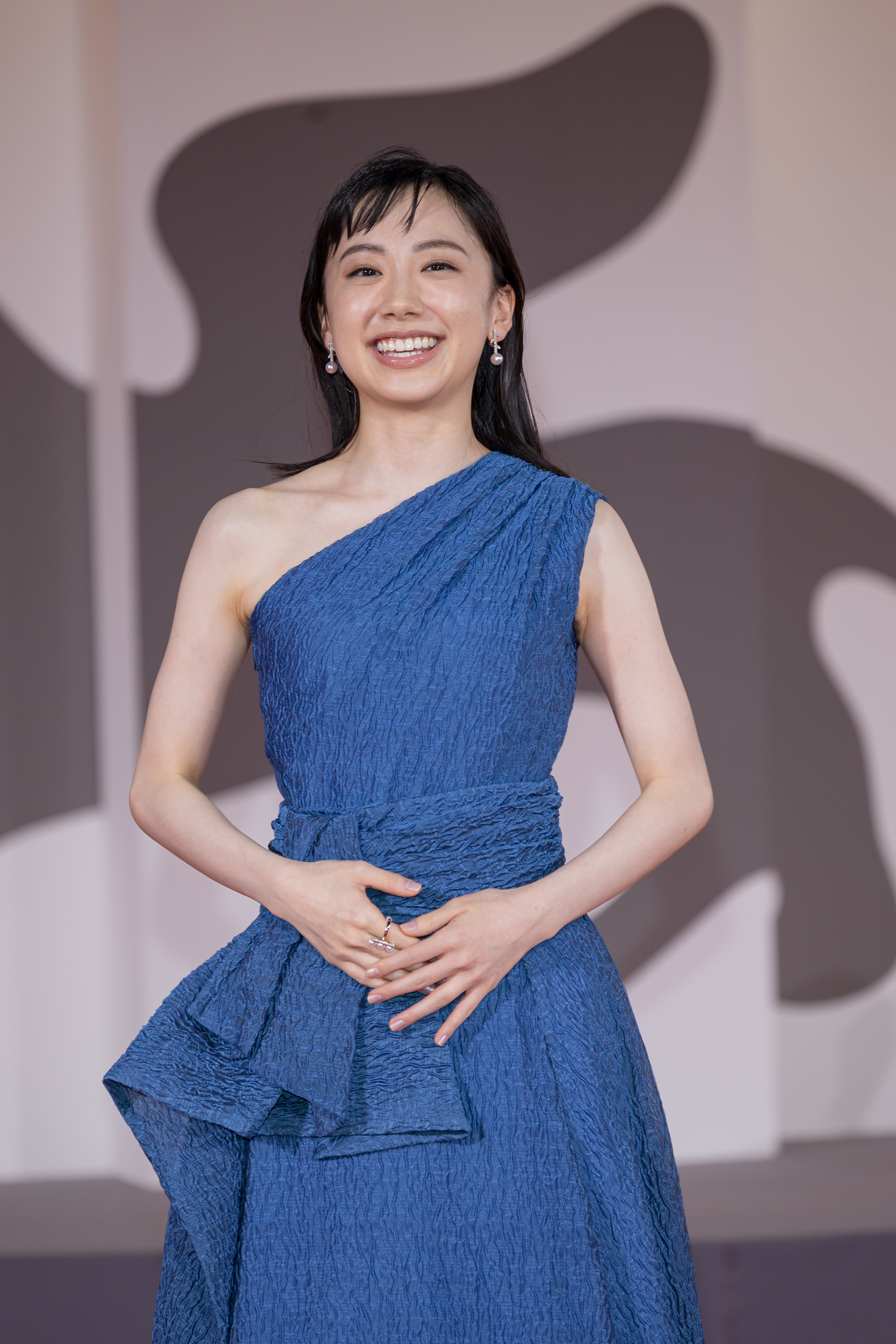
- Ashida in 2025
- Born: 23 June 2004 (age 22); Nishinomiya, Hyōgo, Japan
- Other name: Mana-chan
- Education: Keio Junior High School; Keio Girls Senior High School
- Occupations: Actress; tarento; singer
- Years active: 2009–present
- Employer: Jobbykids
- Notable work: TV dramas: Mother (2010); Marumo no Okite (2011); Beautiful Rain (2012); Film works: Hankyu Densha; Usagi Drop; Jewelpet the Movie: Sweets Dance Princess; Pacific Rim
- Awards: Details

Mana Ashida (芦田 愛菜, Ashida Mana; born June 23, 2004) is a Japanese actress, talent and singer. Her first appearance was in Asahi Broadcasting Corporation's ABC Short Movie 2, though she rose to prominence after acting in the television drama Mother. She became the youngest lead star in Japanese drama history when she starred in Sayonara Bokutachi no Youchien. She was the youngest lead actress in a television serial drama by appearing in the serial drama Marumo no Okite in the spring of 2011. She also appeared in Japanese films such as Confessions and Bunny Drop.

Ashida and her co-actor Fuku Suzuki sang the 2011 hit song "Maru Maru Mori Mori", the theme song for the television drama Marumo no Okite.

== Career ==
=== Early career ===
Ashida made her debut appearance in Asahi Broadcasting Corporation's ABC Short Movie 2. Bokenmama in 2009. Her first film was the live-action film adaptation of the manga Hanbun no Tsuki ga Noboru Sora in 2010. In the same year, she starred in the film Confessions, as Manami Moriguchi. She also appeared in the film Ghost: In Your Arms Again, a Japanese remake of the 1990 film Ghost. For her role in this film, she became one of the winners of the "Rookie of the Year" Award at the 34th Japan Academy Awards.

In addition to acting, Ashida did voice-over roles for foreign films released in Japan. She voiced Agnes in the Japanese version of the film Despicable Me, and she was the voice of the young Fang Deng in the Japanese release of Aftershock.

=== Late 2010 – early 2011: Rise to popularity ===
Ashida rose to prominence after appearing in the award-winning television drama Mother, as Reina Michiki, a young child abused by her mother. She won the Special Award at the 4th Tokyo Drama Awards for her role. At the age of 6, Ashida became the youngest lead actress in a Japanese television drama in the special television drama movie Sayonara Bokutachi no Youchien in 2011. In the spring drama season, she became the youngest actress in a drama series when she starred in the television drama Marumo no Okite. She co-starred in this series with the then-6 year old actor Fuku Suzuki. The series received a viewership rating of 23.9% for its last episode, and an average rating of 15.48% for its entire run.

She made her singing debut with Suzuki. They sang Marumo no Okite's theme song, "Maru–Maru–Mori-Mori! (マル・マル・モリ・モリ!)", under the temporary group name of Kaoru to Tomoki, Tamani Mook (薫と友樹、たまにムック, Kaoru to Tomoki, tama ni mukku). This song, recorded into a single, was released on May 25, 2011 by Universal Music and debuted third on the Oricon charts, which made the duo the youngest group in history to achieve a top-10 position on the Oricon charts. The previous record was set by the group Kigurumi (キグルミ) in 2006. They also participated in the summer edition of the FNS Music Festival, which was broadcast on August 6, 2011 on the Fuji Television network. On August 14, 2011, Ashida appeared in the NHK music television program Music Japan with Suzuki, actress Nozomi Ohashi and actor Seishiro Kato. It was the first time all three appeared in the same show, in its segment entitled "MJ Summer Holidays: Children's Special".

In early 2011, Ashida appeared in several Japanese films, including Inu to Anata no Monogatari, and Hankyū Densha.

=== Late 2011: Solo music and variety host debut ===
Ashida co-starred with actor Kenichi Matsuyama in the manga adaptation Usagi Drop. She played the main character Rin, and was widely praised for her performance. The film's director, Sabu, praised her, saying that her laughter "was always echoing throughout the set, creating a peaceful atmosphere inside the set". The Japan Times reviewer Mark Schilling said that she "seamlessly accomplishes her evolution from forlorn waif to perky if unusually perceptive kid, while effortlessly charming everyone". Mana Ashida won the "Best Newcomer" award at the 54th Blue Ribbon Awards. She was the youngest person to receive this award, beating the 1983 record set by actress Tomoyo Harada.

In October 2011, Ashida began co-hosting the NTV variety and talk show Meringue no Kimochi with the show's long-time hosts, Masami Hisamoto and Asako Ito. This made her the youngest regular host of a talk or variety show.

On September 15, 2011, it was announced that Ashida would make her solo music debut with Universal Music. She released her first single with them in October 2011, and her debut album in late 2011. The album contained songs that "Mama (Mana's mother) wants Mana-chan to sing". Her official profile on Universal Music's website was unveiled during the announcement. The single, a lively dance piece with a cheerful rhythm and similar to Maru–Maru–Mori-Mori!, was entitled "Sutekina Nichiyōbi: Gyu Gyu Good Day!" (ステキな日曜日～Gyu Gyu グッデイ！～). The single was released in Japan on October 26, 2011, and was used in a commercial for Seven & I Holdings Co. It debuted at the 4th position on the Oricon weekly charts. This made Mana Ashida the youngest solo artist to rank in the Oricon weekly TOP10 charts at 7 years and 4 months old, breaking the previous record of 13 years old set by Kumiko Goto in 1987.

Ashida's debut album, entitled Happy Smile!, was released in Japan on November 23, 2011. It debuted at the 8th position on the Oricon weekly charts, making Mana Ashida the youngest artist, at 7 years 5 months old, to have an album in the top 10 position. She beat the previous record of 13 years and 8 months set in 1974 by Canadian singer Rene Simard.

Ashida and Suzuki became the youngest participants on the annual Kōhaku Uta Gassen singing competition by participating in its 62nd edition.

=== 2012–present ===
Ashida voiced the female lead character of Annie in the Japanese anime film adaptation of the Magic Tree House series in the first role in a 2012 film. She performed the theme song of the anime series Jewelpet Kira☆Deco!. The song, entitled "Zutto Zutto Tomodachi", was also used in the 2012 anime film Jewelpet the Movie: Sweets Dance Princess. Ashida also appeared in the film, as Princess Mana. The song was released as a single on May 16, 2012, and reached number 17 on the Oricon Weekly Singles Charts.

Ashida starred as Miu Kinoshita, the daughter of a single father who suffered from juvenile Alzheimer's disease, in Fuji Television's summer drama series Beautiful Rain. She also sang its theme song, entitled "Ame ni Negai o". Written by singer Yumi Matsutoya, Ame ni Negai o was the first drama theme song Mana performed solo. The single was released in Japan on August 1, 2012.

On December 27, 2012, she held her first solo concert at the Curian Shinagawa General Citizen Hall in Tokyo.

Ashida made her Hollywood debut playing the role of young Mako Mori in the 2013 film Pacific Rim. She auditioned for the role in October 2011, when she reportedly impressed the judges with her rich expressiveness. She travelled to Toronto to shoot the film, where she also met Guillermo del Toro. Del Toro allowed Ashida to call him "Totoro-san", due to her being unable to pronounce his surname.

Ashida also appeared in a Celebrity Kids Edition of the Japanese version of the show Who Wants to Be a Millionaire on January 2, 2013. She won the top prize, ¥1,000,000, and became the youngest top prize winner in the Millionaire franchise.

In 2014, Ashida starred in the television series Ashita, Mama ga Inai as Post, a child abandoned at birth at a baby hatch. Her performance in this television series was highly regarded, with 50.8% of viewers expressing high satisfaction with her performance in a survey carried out by Oricon. In 2015, she starred in Rugged! as a 10-year-old company president in her first lead role in a NHK television drama. Ashida is set to play Maomao in Prime Video’s live action adaptation of The Apothecary Diaries

== Personal life ==
Ashida was born on June 23, 2004 in Nishinomiya, Hyogo Prefecture and is an only child. She is commonly nicknamed Mana-chan, which is a combination of her given name and the Japanese honorific used when addressing children (-chan). Ashida revealed that she is a fan of K-pop group Kara. She loves cycling unicycles and reads over 60 books per month.

In April 2017, Ashida was accepted into Keio Junior High school, one of the most top-notch Junior High schools in the Greater Tokyo Area, after passing the entrance exam. In March 2023, Ashida graduated from Keio Girls Senior High School. In April of the same year, she was accepted into Keio University faculty of law.

In March 2025, Ashida was appointed as a goodwill ambassador for climate change at the United Nations Development Programme.

== Filmography ==
=== Films ===
- Hanbun no Tsuki ga Noboru Sora (2010), Mirai Natsume
- Confessions (2010), Manami Moriguchi
- Ghost: In Your Arms Again (2010), the child ghost
- Inu to Anata no Monogatari (2011), Mana
- Hankyū Densha (2011), Ami Hagiwara
- Bunny Drop (2011), Rin Kaga
- Magic Tree House (2012), the voice of Annie.
- Liar Game: Saisei (2012), cool Alice
- Jewelpet the Movie: Sweets Dance Princess (2012), the voice of Princess Mana
- The Floating Castle (2012), Chidori
- Pacific Rim (2013), Mako Mori in her childhood
- Kujikenaide (2013), Toyo Shibata in her childhood
- Entaku (2014), Kotoko Uzuhara
- Takayuki Yamada 3D The Movie (2017)
- Pokémon the Movie: The Power of Us (2018), the voice of Margo
- Children of the Sea (2019), the voice of Ruka Azumi
- Under the Stars (2020), Chihiro
- Poupelle of Chimney Town (2020), the voice of Lubicchi
- The House of the Lost on the Cape (2021), the voice of Yui
- BL Metamorphosis (2022), Urara Sayama
- Lonely Castle in the Mirror (2022), the voice of Ōkami-sama
- Cells at Work! (2024), Niko Urushizaki
- Not Me That Went Viral (2025), Sakura
- Scarlet (2025), the voice of Scarlet
- Mystery Arena (2026), Ichiko

=== Television dramas ===
- ABC Short Movie 2: Daibokenmama (2009)
- Ketto! Rojinto (2009)
- Tokujo Kabachi!! (2010, episode 3)
- Mother (2010), Rena Michiki / Tsugumi Suzuhara
- Toilet no Kamisama (2011), Kana Uemura (childhood)
- Gō (2011), Chacha (Childhood), Sen (Childhood)
- Sayonara Bokutachi no Youchien (2011), Kanna Yamazaki
- Marumo no Okite (2011), Kaoru Sasakura
- Hanazakari no Kimitachi e (2011, episode 1), Kaoru Sasakura (guest)
- In This Corner of the World (2011), Chizuru Hojo
- True Horror Stories: 2011 Summer Season Special (2011)
- Marumo no Okite Special (2011), Kaoru Sasakura
- Antarctica (2011), Haruka Furudate.
- Alice in Liar Game (2012, Spinoff of Liar Game: Saisei film), Alice.
- Beautiful Rain (2012), Miu Kinoshita
- Ashita, Mama ga Inai (2014), Post
- Gin Nikan (2014), Otetsu Maho (childhood)
- Hana-chan no Miso Soup (2014), Hana Yasutake
- Rugged! (2015), Noa Fukami
- Our House (2016), Sakurako Ban
- Manpuku (2018–19), narrator
- Awaiting Kirin (2020–21), Akechi Tama
- The Greatest Teacher (2023), Kanau Ugumori
- Totto no Ketsuraku Seishun-ki (2025), Tetsuko Kuroyanagi
- Kataomoi (2026), Yui
- Extraordinary Attorney Minami (2026), Minami Minamida
- The Apothecary Diaries (2028), Maomao

=== Japanese dub ===
- Despicable Me (2010), Agnes
- Aftershock (2010), young Fang Deng
- Despicable Me 2 (2013), Agnes
- The Peanuts Movie (2015), Little Red-Haired Girl
- Godzilla: King of the Monsters (2019), Madison Russell
- Godzilla vs. Kong (2021), Madison Russell

=== Variety ===
- Meringue (2011–2012) – co-host with Hisamoto Masami and Ito Asako
- Music Japan (2011)
- Kōhaku Uta Gassen
  - 62nd NHK Kōhaku Uta Gassen (2011)
  - 77th NHK Kōhaku Uta Gassen (2026)
- Sandwichman & Mana Ashida's Hakase-chan (2019–present)

=== Video games ===
- Ni no Kuni: Shiroki Seihai no Joō (2011) as voice of the Mysterious Girl (Kokoru).

== Discography ==
=== Singles ===
Year	No.	Title	Notes	Chart position		
Year	No.	Title	Notes	Oricon Weekly Singles Chart	Billboard Japan Hot 100*	RIAJ Digital Track Chart
2011	1	"Maru Maru Mori Mori!"	Collaboration with Fuku Suzuki; theme song of drama Marumo no Okite	2		
2011	2	"Sutekina Nichiyōbi (Gyu Gyu Good Day)"	First solo single	4		
2012	3	"Zutto Zutto Tomodachi"	Theme song of Jewelpet Kira Deco!	17		
2012	4	"Ame ni Negai o"	Theme song of drama Beautiful Rain	16		
2014	5	"Fight!!/ Yuuki"	Theme song of the 81st edition of The Nationwide Contest of Music sponsored by NHK	30		
2014	6	"Maru Maru Mori Mori! 2014"	Collaboration with Fuku Suzuki; theme song of drama Marumo no Okite SP 2014	50		

=== Albums ===
- Happy Smile! (Universal Music, November 23, 2011)

== Awards ==
=== 2010 ===
- 4th Tokyo Drama Awards: Special Award for Mother

=== 2011 ===
- 34th Japan Academy Film Prize: Rookie of the Year for Ghost: In Your Arms Again
- 2011 Tokyo Drama Awards: Best Performance by an Actress for Marumo no Okite and Sayonara Bokutachi no Youchien
- 53rd Japan Record Award: Special Award for Maru Maru Mori Mori!
- 54th Blue Ribbon Awards: Best Newcomer for Hankyū Densha and Usagi Drop

=== 2023 ===
- 47th Elan d'or Awards: Newcomer of the Year

== Bibliography ==
- Mana Mana (愛菜学, lit. 'Mana Study'), ISBN 978-4-06-216617-1, released December 14, 2010
- Mana no Hondana (まなの本棚, lit. 'Mana's Bookshelf'), ISBN 978-4093887007, released July 18, 2019
