= 2026 in Japanese music =

The year 2026 in Japanese music.

== Debuts ==
=== Debuting groups ===
- GPP

== Releases ==
=== First quarter ===
==== January ====
Date	Album	Artist	Ref.
1	34/45	Akira Jimbo	
7	Amarimono	Tamio Okuda	
7	Unstoppable	Daisuke Namikawa	
14	Best of AK-69: Yellow Gold	AK-69	
14	DJ Daishizen Presents Daichi Miura Non Stop DJ MixDaichi Miura Vol.3	Daichi Miura	
14	My Respect	Nogizaka46	
14	Rainy. And	Rainy	
14	Repeated Reflect	Nako Misaki	
14	Sensation Circle	Masaki Suda	
14	Terminal	Da-ice	
14	Wishlist	NCT Wish	
15	Doh Yoh	@onefive	
21	A Fraction–VI	Ayasa	
21	The Abyss	Natori	
21	Chopin Orbit	Hayato Sumino	
21	Covers	Hideaki Tokunaga	
21	Gozo	Nemophila	
21	MileSixTones: Best Tracks	SixTones	
21	Re:One	Keita Tachibana	
21	Rock in City: Band Covers Only	Deen	
21	The Museum IV	Nana Mizuki	
21	Rhetorica	Reol	
21	Shadow	Kent Itō	
23	The Core	XG	
23	The Weight of Sound	Crystal Lake	
23	Yoo-hoo	Shintaro Sakamoto	
26	The Fusion	Ømi	
28	Hot Topic	Hanabie	
28	Ketsunopolis 14	Ketsumeishi	
28	Kimi to Boku no Yakusoku	Root	
28	Love Leap Forth	Mayu Mineda	
28	Lyrical Tattoo	Base Ball Bear	
28	Reborn	Do as Infinity	
28	Share Music	Hiroshi Kamiya	
28	Shikanoco	Yurika Kubo	
28	Stage: The Musical in My Head	Mika Nakashima	
28	Theme Songs for the Theater	Kiyoshi Hikawa	
28	Underworld	PinocchioP	

==== February ====
Date	Album	Artist	Ref.
3	Ever Joyful	Rina Aiuchi	
3	Play	MiSaMo	
4	Crack and Flap	Shiina Natsukawa	
4	LostAndFound	SennaRin	
4	Reboot	Naoto Inti Raymi	
6	Disasterpiece	Mori Calliope	
11	0401 – The Best Days of Kasane Teto 2026	Kasane Teto	
11	Ever Green	Tooboe	
11	From Now to Then	Seamo	
11	Kawaii Lab. Best Album	Team Kawaii Lab.	
11	Rock 'N' Roll Journey: 30th Anniversary Best	Nanase Aikawa	
11	Shadow Work	Angela Aki	
11	Shishamo Deshita	Shishamo	
11	Smile	Miki Imai	
11	Stay Alive	STAYC	
11	Superliminal	M-Flo	
11	Twelve Ephemeral Variations	Quruli	
12	Welcome to Sunshine	Fantastics from Exile Tribe	
18	ChaosBlue	Granrodeo	
18	Idol1st	Kento Nakajima	
18	Newme	Ua	
18	Outstanding Power	Lovebites	
18	Tone	Uru	
18	Uku	Sakura Fujiwara	
23	Hana	Hana	
25	IMI	Passepied	
25	My Gleam	Miho Okasaki	
25	Oh, Guys. We Meet Again. Uh...	Gre4n Boyz	
25	Runway	Ae! Group	
25	Texte	Mone Kamishiraishi	

==== March ====
Date	Album	Artist	Ref.
4	American Classics	Junko Onishi	
4	Clear's ga Daijūtai	Clear's	
4	Fire Inside Us	Nothing's Carved in Stone	
4	Gold Fashion	BRADIO	
4	Hankei 3 Meters	Chiai Fujikawa	
4	Letters	Riho Furui	
4	Nemomatic	Lil League from Exile Tribe	
4	Nowz	Nowz	
4	Second Person	Yorushika	
4	Singles Best	Remioromen	
4	Still Shine: Her Songs, Our Harmony	Chemistry	
4	Symphonic Remix Best	Hiro Shimono	
4	The Symphonic Sessions III	Taro Hakase	
4	Tokimeki Smile	Chō Tokimeki Sendenbu	
11	The Baddest: Son of R&B	Toshinobu Kubota	
11	Collection Album: Season	Idoly Pride	
11	Fluorite	HoneyWorks featuring HaKoniwalily	
11	Forbidden	Ringo Sheena	
11	Generation of Yusuke	Yusuke	
11	Ikimonogakari Meets 2	Various artists	
11	Jekyll	Hyde	
11	Shin-On	Yuzu	
11	Yuiitsumuni	West	
18	A Band	Ohashi Trio	
18	The Black Album	Dreams Come True	
18	Juju's Showa-Era Café: Time Travel	Juju	
18	One	Sandaime J Soul Brothers from Exile Tribe	
18	Re-Birth	Spyair	
18	[Sky]showdown	Tokyo Ska Paradise Orchestra	
18	This Is Rin	Rin Kurusu	
18	Tokyo City Lights	Huwie Ishizaki	
18	Too Fast to Disband Too Young to Die	Bish	
18	Velvet Grace	Miliyah Kato	
23	Heart Beat	DXTeen	
25	Archive	Daichi Miura	
25	Éclore	Glim Spanky	
25	Egu Douchu	Takuya Eguchi	
25	Excuse Error	Wanima	
25	First Move	Hi-Fi Un!corn	
25	Fujieda EP	Asian Kung-Fu Generation	
25	I Best: Single Collection	Chico with Honeyworks	
25	Illusion	Ryubi Miyase	
25	Keisōdo	Zutomayo	
25	Party!Party!!Party!!!	Sayuri Date	
25	Ubugoe	Mr. Children	
30	24karats Golden Best	Exile	

=== Second quarter ===
==== April ====
Date	Album	Artist	Ref.
1	Arange	Dish//	
1	Bright On	Ran Itō	
1	Dance to the Music: Journey with Philosophy no Dance	Philosophy no Dance	
1	Good Girl but Not for You	NiziU	
1	Like You Better (Japanese Ver.)	Fromis_9	
1	Melty Love	Girls²	
1	Piggs Rebellion	Piggs	
1	Pyramid	Novelbright	
8	Cover Takahisa Masuda	Takahisa Masuda	
8	Mortal Downer	Dir En Grey	
8	Sue Ann – Homage to Antonio Carlos Jobim	Lisa Ono	
13	We on Fire	E-Side 4	
15	Ampland Plan	Chiaki Mayumura	
15	Echo	Gero	
15	Lace Up	Lisa	
15	Life Goes On	Kaz	
15	Shizukunone	Momoka Ariyasu	
15	This Is How I Am	Shinjiro Atae	
15	Triangle	Silent Siren	
21	Love Psychedelico Naked Songs	Love Psychedelico	
22	Adieu 5	Adieu	
22	Divine	Last Alliance	
22	Evermore	D'erlanger	
22	I.K.T	Erika Ikuta	
22	Shift	Kirito	
23	Completeness	Ave Mujica	
24	Beat	Ballistik Boyz from Exile Tribe	
24	E-Side 4	Yoasobi	
24	Sakihokoru Toki o Matsu no wa	Yesung	
26	Energy Flo	U-zhaan and Ryuichi Sakamoto	
29	Etc.Works4	Mongol800	
29	Kurogane	Inuwasi	
29	Millinity	Urbangarde	
29	Momentum	Timelesz	
29	Re:Blue	Myname	

==== May ====
Date	Album	Artist	Ref.
1	Akina Note	Akina Nakamori	
6	÷0	Aobozu	
6	Take It Rosy!	Mitsuhiro Oikawa	
13	30th Anniversary	Puffy AmiYumi	
13	Kamisama no Iutoori	Masashi Sada	
18	Quartet	Is:sue	
20	Are You Red.Y?	Ryosuke Yamada	
20	But Beautiful	Sadao Watanabe	
20	Ichigo Ichie	Supernova	
20	StandBy	Fear, and Loathing in Las Vegas	
27	Dialogue	Ayase	
27	Echo	Scandal	
27	Love Beat	Kana Nishino	
27	Lucid Dream	Ive	
27	Non-Scenario Etude / Sora Amamiya Sakuhinshū 2: Theory	Sora Amamiya	
27	Still Temporary, Somehow Permanent	Creep Hyp	
27	Transcendent Love	Kaf	

==== June ====
Date	Album	Artist	Ref.
3	Asceeension	Sota Hanamura	
3	Blank Expression	Yurina Hirate	
3	Gate of Hell	Unlucky Morpheus	
3	Hanbunko	Yukari Tamura	
3	Juke Box	Hokuto	
3	Ri Pathos	Rico Sasaki	
3	Rooom	Aooo	
3	Spirit	Akane Takayanagi	
3	Voyage	T-Square	
5	Jet Bangin'	The Jet Boy Bangerz from Exile Tribe	
5	Present	Doberman Infinity	
10	Rising in Bloom	East of Eden	
10	Sakamoto Fuyumi 40th Best: Wadachi	Fuyumi Sakamoto	
10	Synchronicity	Ringwanderung	
17	Ave Música	Ave Mujica	
17	Gang Final	Gang Parade	
17	Hellmate	Nexz	
17	Kids00's	Kid Phenomenon from Exile Tribe	
17	ND5	Naniwa Danshi	
17	Pressed Flowers	Tomori Kusunoki	
24	Dynamic	Shizuka Kudo	
24	Hitotarashi	Keisuke Kuwata	
24	Homework	Senri Oe	
24	Hyper Kuromism	Kuromi	
24	Invention	Shōya Chiba	
24	Jinsei	Super Beaver	
24	More! More! EP	Juice=Juice	
24	Sakuraization	@onefive	
24	Sketch	Takumi Kawanishi	
24	Seven Blooms	Girls²	
24	Trinity from the Shadows	Blankey Jet City	
24	Ultracti:on	Hiromitsu Kitayama	
24	Unity	Hey Smith and Less Than Jake	
24	Univer5oul	The Gospellers	
24	Violet, Brimming Over	Indigo la End	
26	The Book For,	Yoasobi	

=== Third quarter ===
==== July ====
Date	Album	Artist	Ref.
1	Climax	Lynch	
1	I Am a Singer Vol.4	Toshi	
1	Limitless	Shouta Aoi	
1	Portfolio	NiziU	
1	Rashisa	Naomi Payton	
1	Slide	Park Yuchun	
1	Ta13oo	Urashimasakatasen	
1	Zutto Kimi o Sagashiteiru	SKE48 Team S	
3	Basin Techno	Taiiku Okazaki	
8	19Box: Starman	Ikusaburo Yamazaki	
8	Focus	Yūya Hirose	
8	Wave	Kazuya Kamenashi	
15	Best Selection!	Shikao Suga	
15	The Bible 2	Kotoko	
15	Birthday	Misato Watanabe	
15	Chiheisei	MyGO!!!!!	
15	Corkscrew 2026	Kuroyume	
15	A Cry from the Sky Above	Galneryus	
15	Drug Treatment 2026	Kuroyume	
15	Imperfect	Androp	
15	Kimi Kanetsuchū	Rie Takahashi	
15	The Wave	A.B.C-Z	
22	Being Able to Miss You	Hanako Oku	
22	Polyphony	Ami Maeshima	
22	To the Living Creatures	Akiko Yano	
24	From Tokyo with Love	Atarashii Gakko!	
24	Kiss n Tell	Aespa	
29	Adamantite	Kuzuha	
29	Fate/Grand Order: The Best of Theme Songs Yoin	Maaya Sakamoto	
29	KMK	NEWS	
29	Piercing	Nariaki Obukuro	

==== August ====
Date	Album	Artist	Ref.
5	Damdarah	Super Eight	
5	The Dream of a Failed Butterfly	A Flood of Circle	
5	Gokuraku yori Gokujō no Ame	Kizu	
5	Iginari Best	Made in Tohoku	
5	XO	DJ Krush × Ill-Bosstino	
12	Checkpoint	Takuya Kimura	
12	Kansha Shika Gozaimasen	Yo Oizumi	
12	New Chapter Purple	Endrecheri	
12	Tratsnom	Band Ja Naimon! Maxx Nakayoshi	
12	Tui no Kyōkaisen	Yoshino Nanjō	
19	KaikiLove	Zerobaseone	
19	Haikyu!! × BOS: Shudaikatachi no Utage	Burnout Syndromes	
19	Made of Glass	Milet	
19	Produce 101 Japan Shinsekai	Produce 101 Japan Shinsekai	
19	Refractions	Cornelius	
19	Yes	YoonHak	
21	Zambient	Towa Tei	
24	Amenity	Snow Man	
26	31	Leo Ieiri	
26	#Best 2015-2025	Twice	
26	Braze	Enjin	
26	Dokan Revolver 2.66	Recitals	
26	E.D Morrison	Moonriders	
26	Grow	Bonnie Pink	
26	Hikawadai Nikki	The Band Apart	
26	Humor	Miyu Irino	
26	Infinite Resonance 4	FripSide	
26	Kariuta III	Masayoshi Ōishi	
26	Lehre der Rose	Roselia	
26	Love Is All Around	Kotaro Oshio	
26	Power of Love	Kana Nishino	
26	Super Star	Yuya Tegoshi	
26	Zion	ExWhyZ	

==== September ====
Date	Album	Artist	Ref.
1	So Honey EP	King & Prince	
2	Atomew	Tempalay	
2	Crossing featuring Series: Taketatsu Ayana	Ayana Taketatsu	
2	Deen the Best DX II: Basic to Respect	Deen	
2	Frequency	Monkey Majik	
2	Handle with Care	Izna	
2	Hooman After All	SiM	
2	I Know I Don't Know	Daichi Miura	
2	Kiyoshi Hikawa Sings Hibari Misora	Kiyoshi Hikawa	
2	Memorabilia	Omoinotake	
2	My Étoile	Miho Okasaki	
2	Own	Riho Sayashi	
2	Story of Sid	Sid	
3	Flux	Neo Japonism	
9	20 Lights: The Collection	Ayaka	
9	Amatago	Ryokuoushoku Shakai	
9	Aimyon Best Album: Chase the Lips!	Aimyon	
9	Bouquet	Mone Kamishiraishi	
9	First Time Mika Nakashima	Mika Nakashima	
9	Inclination	Mari Hamada	
9	Kajitsu	Porno Graffitti	
9	Kidoairaku	Tatsuro	
9	Ko	Chage	
9	Love Hate	Keina Suda	
9	My Orchestra!	Ayaka Hirahara	
9	Nichijō Day	Kazuyoshi Saito	
9	Supernova	Masaharu Fukuyama	
11	Blast	Ballistik Boyz from Exile Tribe	
11	Yours Sincerely	Haruomi Hosono	
14	Because You Know Me as If You Know Everything About Me	Fumino	
14	Cheetah	Red Velvet – Irene & Seulgi	
16	Breath	Little Glee Monster	
16	Love Engine	Milk	
16	Mind+	HY	
16	Nani?	Crazy Ken Band	
16	Shunkashūtō	After the Rain	
16	Siraha	Inuwasi	
16	Song of Life	Asaka	
16	Sweat: Japanese EP	Kiss of Life	
18	12 Conversations	Ryuichi Sakamoto and Alva Noto	
18	Back to the Memories the Best	Fantastics from Exile Tribe	
18	Utau,Taitai	Gre4n Boyz	
18	Watch Me	Be:First	
23	Amiism	Amii Ozaki	
23	Eclipse	Angelo	
23	Hanaumui	Cocco	
23	Kayō Kikō 25: Koi no Owari no Nagoya ni Hitori	Kaori Mizumori	
23	Masterpieces	Masayuki Suzuki	
23	Quantum	TMNetwork	
23	Re:Idol	Lightsum	
24	King's Back!!	Koki Tanaka a.k.a Joker	
25	Friday	I Don't Like Mondays	
25	Optimize = Optdemise	Coldrain	
25	Repsycle +	Hide with Spread Beaver	
29	Pops	Mrs. Green Apple	
30	Happy-Go-Lucky	Chihiro Yamanaka	
30	Love	Sung Si-kyung	
30	Maze Runner: Way Out	N.SSign	
30	New World Carnival: Iza Miwaku no Ōunabara e	Houshou Marine	
30	Trace	Seo In-guk	
30	Unbound	Eir Aoi	
30	The Way of L.O.V-E	A.B.C-Z	

=== Fourth quarter ===
==== October ====
Date	Album	Artist	Ref.
2	Animal	JO1	
2	Hatena	Imase	
2	Tabi	Chanyeol	
7	2026	Hilcrhyme	
7	39rpm	Miku Itō	
7	Inochi no Fukaki Chikara ni	Nobuyasu Okabayashi	
7	Over the Raindow	Nao Tōyama	
7	Swirl	Miku Itō	
14	Blooming Cinderella	Sakura Miko	
14	Lovers & Dreamers	Lecca	
14	Night in Bloom Hiroshi Takeshima 25th	Hiroshi Takeshima	
14	Space Rendezvous	Tani Yuuki	
14	TMG III Sayonara	TMG	
14	Wonder Yard	Exile B Happy	
14	Yawaraka na Dōkutsu	Hump Back	
14	Yuienne	Kariyushi58	
20	With	Katsunori Takahashi	
21	2016–2025	Iri	
21	24/7: JSB Forever	Sandaime J Soul Brothers from Exile Tribe	
21	Ataeteko	Aiko	
21	Best of Anime	Spyair	
21	Canon Feel	Syrup16g	
21	Decade Emo EP	Straightener	
21	For the Last Moment, Spending Passionate Days with Thoughts That's Driven Me Crazy	Aiko	
21	Full Circle	CNBLUE	
21	God's Blood	Ave Mujica	
21	Ima to Boku	Hiroyuki Yoshino	
21	Miraiiro	Devil Anthem	
21	Tabi Suru Riyū o Machinagara	Glay	
27	Tomorrow	Takumi Kawanishi	
28	Alice the Best: Torilogy	Alice	
28	All My Love	Rebecca	
28	Candy Tune Solo Box	Candy Tune	
28	Clean+Noise	Noa	
28	Dezert	Dezert	
28	Dreamin'	Beni	
28	Hibi – Seasons That Could Be	Sarah Àlainn	
28	Kis Scene	Kis-My-Ft2	
28	Narrative	Sayaka Yamamoto	
28	Re:Code	Passcode	
28	Rise of the Man	Galileo Galilei	
30	A Decade of Greatest Hits (2015–2025)	One Ok Rock	
30	Unreleased Collection – Japan Exclusive	One Ok Rock	

==== November ====
Date	Album	Artist	Ref.
2	Dreaming	Tomohisa Yamashita	
2	Mirror Mirror	Hakos Baelz	
3	Be:4U	Be:First	
4	Blank Canvas	Gan	
4	Check!	Tokino Sora	
4	Dekai	Tatsuya Kitani	
4	Emotional Mind	Motoi Sakuraba	
4	Even When You Grow Up, the Night Is Still Dark	Uchuu Nekoko	
4	Hata Motohiro o Utau: Hata Motohiro Tribute	Various artists	
4	Hohaba	BoA	
4	Love Songs Cover 5 – My White Days	Tomoyo Harada	
4	M25	Mika Nakashima	
4	Momo Asakura Best Album: Retailer	Momo Asakura	
4	Nascene	Toma Ikuta	
4	Nameless	Soma Saito	
4	Philosophical Return	Motoi Sakuraba	
4	Pure	Tatsuya Kitani	
4	Sutacha Mamire?!	Angela	
5	Milet × Toru	Milet	
10	True	Hey! Say! JUMP	
11	Easy	Girls²	
11	I'm All Yours	Mitsuki Takahata	
11	Legend	Chanmina	
11	Mai Kuraki × Detective Conan Collaboration Best 30: Kimi ga Ite Kureta kara, Uta ga Aru	Mai Kuraki	
11	Yasashii Inryoku	Cent Chihiro Chittiii	
13	Homura	Sable Hills	
16	Smile	Octpath	
18	Dive In!	Daiki Yamashita	
18	Jewel Basket	Travis Japan	

==== December ====
Date	Album	Artist	Ref.
2	Umami	Hanabie.	
23	The Circus	Man with a Mission	

== Disbanding and retiring artists ==
- Amefurasshi
- Arashi
- The Dance for Philosophy
- ExWhyZ
- Shishamo
- Tokyo Girls' Style
- Ukka
- Wasuta

== See also ==
- 2026 in Japan
  - Music of Japan
