= Mission: Yozakura Family =

Japanese manga series by Hitsuji Gondaira

- First tankōbon volume cover

夜桜さんちの大作戦 (Yozakura-san Chi no Daisakusen)
- Genre: Romantic comedy; Spy; Thriller
- Manga
- Written by: Hitsuji Gondaira
- Published by: Shueisha
- English publisher: NA: Viz Media
- Imprint: Jump Comics
- Magazine: Weekly Shōnen Jump
- Original run: August 26, 2019 – January 20, 2025
- Volumes: 29
- Anime television series
- Directed by: Mirai Minato (Note: Chief director (総監督) for season 2.); Takahiro Nakatsugawa (S2)
- Produced by: Genta Ozaki; Shouta Itou; Ikumi Koga; Hiroyuki Aoi (S1); Misaki Sugiura (S1, S2P2); Youhei Fukui (S2P1); Kouhei Matsuoka (S2)
- Written by: Mirai Minato
- Music by: Kōji Fujimoto; Osamu Sasaki (S1)
- Studio: Silver Link
- Licensed by: Disney Platform Distribution (Note: In select territories)
- Original network: JNN (MBS, TBS), BS NTV, AT-X
- Original run: April 7, 2024 – present
- Episodes: 46
- icon

Mission: Yozakura Family (Japanese: 夜桜さんちの大作戦, Hepburn: Yozakura-san Chi no Daisakusen) is a Japanese manga series written and illustrated by Hitsuji Gondaira. It has been serialized in Shueisha's shōnen manga magazine Weekly Shōnen Jump from August 2019 to January 2025, with its chapters collected in 29 tankōbon volumes. An anime television series adaptation produced by Silver Link aired from April to October 2024. A second season is set to air in two cours; the first cours from April to June 2026, and the second cours in October 2026.

== Plot ==
The series follows Taiyo Asano, a boy who lost his family in a car crash. His childhood friend, Mutsumi Yozakura, is his only comfort in life. However, things change for Taiyo again, when he discovers that his vice principal is not only the older brother of Mutsumi, but she also comes from a family of spies. After a fight involving the Yozakura family, Taiyo becomes Mutsumi's husband, and in order to protect her, he must become a spy himself.

== Characters ==
=== The Yozakura Family ===
Taiyo Asano (朝野 太陽, Asano Taiyō)
Voiced by: Reiji Kawashima, Hana Sato^{Ep. 31 credits} (young) (Japanese); Griffin Burns (English)
Mutsumi's husband who is very kind and compassionate, which is very surprising in the world of spies. Originally an ordinary human, his training to be a spy has caused him to become superhuman. His reason for marrying Mutsumi is because of the Yozakura family's one rule: "No killing among family", the one thing that would protect him from getting killed by Mutsumi's overprotective brother Kyoichiro. He specializes in using Yae, a revolver that fires electricity instead of bullets, and can transform into a katana. After Mutsumi gives him some of her blood, he gains abilities of the Yozakura family, including the ability of "Blooming". His Blooming ability allows him to harden his body. His signature color is red.
Mutsumi Yozakura (夜桜 六美, Yozakura Mutsumi)
Voiced by: Kaede Hondo (Japanese); Abby Trott (English)
Taiyo's wife who is sweet, loving and responsible, as well as the tenth head of the Yozakura family. Although she has no special abilities like her siblings, she is the only one capable of producing the next generation of Yozakura spies due to her ability to produce the Someinine that gives the family their abilities. Her signature color is blue.
Kyoichiro Yozakura (夜桜 凶一郎, Yozakura Kyōichirō)
Voiced by: Katsuyuki Konishi, Miho Wataya (young) (Japanese); Sean Chiplock (English)
The eldest sibling of the Yozakura family. He is psychotically overprotective of Mutsumi. He is willing to torture and murder others to protect her, which results in him having an antagonistic relationship with Taiyo. He uses weapon called Steel Spider, a large amount of steel thread he can manipulate at will. He is the vice principal, under a pseudonym, at the school that Mutsumi and Taiyo attend. His Blooming ability lets him coat his threads in his blood to corrode and destroy everything around him. His signature color is black.
Futaba Yozakura (夜桜 二刃, Yozakura Futaba)
Voiced by: Akari Kitō (Japanese); Cherami Leigh (English)
The second sibling of the Yozakura family. Despite being somewhat violent and strict, she is actually very caring and motherly. She specializes in martial arts, specifically aikido and jujitsu, and can use said martial arts to control wind. Her Blooming ability allows her to engulf and nullify attacks. Her signature color is white.
Shinzo Yozakura (夜桜 辛三, Yozakura Shinzō)
Voiced by: Kazuyuki Okitsu, Momoka Terasawa (young) (Japanese); Clifford Chapin (English)
The third sibling of the Yozakura family. He has a glass heart and is easily embarrassed, but very caring. He is a weapon specialist, capable of using almost any weapon he can get his hands on, and can even craft his own, his most powerful being a shapeshifting alloy called "Turmeric". His Blooming ability allows him to see how to destroy anything. His signature color is green.
Shion Yozakura (夜桜 四怨, Yozakura Shion)
Voiced by: Aoi Yūki (Japanese); Anne Yatco (English)
The fourth sibling of the Yozakura family. She is somewhat nonchalant, but also aggressive and competitive. She is a hacking specialist, and can even create programs in the form of video games. Her Blooming ability allows her to read data at the speed of a supercomputer. Her signature color is magenta.
Kengo Yozakura (夜桜 嫌五, Yozakura Kengo)
Voiced by: Yoshitsugu Matsuoka (Japanese); Khoi Dao (English)
The fifth sibling of the Yozakura family. He is a free spirit, and would rather do fun things then work. He also cares a lot about his appearance, specifically his skin. He can disguise himself as anyone and mimic their voice perfectly, making him a espionage specialist. His Blooming ability allows him to "empathize" with his opponent and essentially read their minds and understand everything about them. His signature color is yellow.
Nanao Yozakura (夜桜 七悪, Yozakura Nanao)
Voiced by: Yumi Uchiyama (Japanese); Suzie Yeung (English)
The youngest sibling of the Yozakura family. He is the kindest of the siblings, although he has a unintentional dark side. He is a medical genius, able to create multiple drugs, for lethal intentions, or for healing. He is a mutant as a result of multiple experiments, although he can alter his shape to appear more human. His Blooming ability allows him to detoxify any poison, although different ones have different effects, such as plutonium causing him to glow, or pufferfish causing his stomach to swell. His signature color is turquoise.
Goliath (ゴリアテ, Goriate)
Voiced by: Yoshitsugu Matsuoka (Japanese); Bryce Papenbrook (English)
The family guard dog. He is a Okami dog, and has guarded the family for generations. He is able to alter his size at will.
Ai (アイ)
Voiced by: Misaki Kuno (Japanese); Kimberley Anne Campbell (English)
A girl placed under the care of the Yozakura family after the loss of her guardian. A former leader of Tanpopo, she had her DNA mixed with an Okami dog, granting her that species' abilities. Taiyo and Mutsumi see her as their daughter.
Hifumi Yozakura (夜桜 ひふみ, Yozakura Hifumi)
The daughter of Taiyo and Mutsumi born during the timeskip. She is very playful and reckless, and extremely clingy with her brother, to the point of overprotection. She is a natural fighter, with her weapon of choice being a modified yo-yo. Her blooming allows her to produce an infinite amount of someinine energy that she can control at will.
Alpha Yozakura (夜桜 あるふぁ, Yozakura Arufa)
The son of Taiyo and Mutsumi born during the timeskip. He is very intelligent and mature for his age, although he has a habit of being over protective. He is a genius in various subjects in science. He has a special hi-tech watch, named the Alpha Watch, that can change into different types of weapons. He has a darker split personality dubbed "Bad Alpha". His blooming allows him to see multiple possible futures.
Ban Yozakura (夜桜 万, Yozakura Ban)
Voiced by: Kazuhiko Inoue (Japanese); Kirk Thornton (English)
The maternal grandfather of the siblings. He is the husband of Keiko.
Keiko Yozakura (夜桜 京子, Yozakura Keiko)
Voiced by: Eiko Yamada (Japanese); Dorothy Fahn (English)
The maternal grandmother of the siblings. She is the eighth head of the Yozakura family.
Rei Yozakura (夜桜 零, Yozakura Rei)
Voiced by: Noriko Hidaka (Japanese); Lauren Landa (English)
The matriarch of the Yozakura family. She was the ninth head of the family until she and Mutsumi were kidnapped by Tanpopo. She was killed in the process while Mutsumi survived.

=== The Asa Family ===
Asa (旦)
Voiced by: Shin-ichiro Miki

=== Hinagiku ===
Sui Aoi (蒼 翠, Aoi Sui)
Voiced by: Koki Uchiyama (Japanese); Stephen Fu (English)
One of the leaders of the Hinagiku and a friend of Mutsumi. He often cuts clothing to pieces via a special striking maneuver, the first strike of which always hits the chest.
Rin Fudo (不動 りん, Fudō Rin)
Voiced by: Romi Park (Japanese); Amber Lee Connors (English)
The head of the Hinagiku. She is a tall, buxom woman who was captured at one point by Tanpopo, which led her founding Hinagiku. She is a former classmate of Kyoichiro and Seiji, though she does not get along with the former, as they both often clash, much to Mutsumi's dismay.
Ouga Inugami (犬神 王牙, Inugami Ōga)
Voiced by: Daiki Hamano (Japanese); Andrew Russell (English)

=== Tanpopo ===
Makoto Kawashita (皮下 真, Kawashita Makoto)
Voiced by: Yūji Ueda (Japanese); Brian Beacock (English)
A doctor who is involved with Tanpopo. He was tasked with studying the Yozakura family.
Momo Yozakura (夜桜 百, Yozakura Momo)
Voiced by: Koichi Yamadera (Japanese); Aaron LaPlante (English)
The patriarch of the Yozakura family. He was involved with the kidnapping of Rei and Mutsumi, which left Rei dead, while Mutsumi survived after being found by Kyoichiro. He has stayed hidden ever since that event.
Tsubomi Yozakura (夜桜 つぼみ, Yozakura Tsubomi)
Voiced by: Yukana (Japanese); Deneen Melody (English)
The first head of the Yozakura family. She was also a prisoner who Makoto experimented on during World War II. Her powers allowed her to heal other people.
Yuki Shirai (白井 雪, Shirai Yuki) / Hakuja (ハクジャ)
Voiced by: Rina Satō (Japanese); Cristina Vee (English)
A member of Tanpopo's Nijibana. She is formerly a patient who was in the care of Taiyo's parents, Akari and Hide. Her long white hair is her main weapon, as the Hazakura effects were focused on her hair.
Mizuki (ミズキ)
Voiced by: Kenji Nojima (Japanese); Brandon McInnis (English)
A leader of Tanpopo and a member of the Nijibana Rainbow Flowers. He is able to use poison gases. A soil pollution caused a disease in his hometown that killed many people including his wife and daughter. He was saved by Makoto.
Miki Akasaka (赤坂 ミキ, Akasaka Miki) / Akai (アカイ)
Voiced by: Ami Koshimizu (Japanese); Tiana Camacho (English)
Akai is a leader of Tanpopo. Her house was set on fire by an arsonist when she was 17. Makoto saved her by grafting her siblings' body parts onto her while giving her the Hazakura drug, which gave her the ability to use fire, later getting revenge on the arsonist.
Ryo Aoyanagi (青柳 涼, Aoyanagi Ryō) / Aonuma (アオヌマ)
Voiced by: Chiaki Kobayashi (Japanese); Kevin Andrew Rivera (English)
Yoshimasa Kuroda (黒田 善正, Kuroda Yoshimasa) / Kurosawa (クロサワ)
Chacha (チャチャ)
Voiced by: Mitsuaki Madono (Japanese); Daman Mills (English)
Nohmen (ノウメン, Noumen)
Voiced by: Masaya Matsukaze (Japanese); Kayleigh McKee (English)
The owner of Hotel Dandy Lion, he is an associate of Tanpopo, mostly Makoto.
Yama-chan (山ちゃん)
Voiced by: Ryunosuke Watanuki (Japanese); Imari Williams (English)

=== Spy Association ===
Kai Izumo (出雲 灰, Izumo Kai)
Voiced by: Hiroshi Kamiya
Alexandryu (アレクサンド龍, Arekusandoryū)
Voiced by: Hōchū Ōtsuka
Ayaka Kirisaki (切崎 殺香, Kirisaki Ayaka)
Voiced by: Mariya Ise (Japanese); Kayli Mills (English)
Former classmate of Taiyo and Mutsumi. She has a certain admiration or obsession for both. She is the maid of the Yozakura family.
Tsukiyo Hoshifuru (星降 月夜, Hoshifuru Tsukiyo)
Voiced by: Jun Fukuyama (Japanese); Landon McDonald (English)
Me-chan (めーちゃん)
Voiced by: Saori Ōnishi (Japanese); Anairis Quiñones (English)
Usa the Hell ears (地獄耳の宇佐, Jigokumimi no Usa)

=== Others ===
Seiji Hotokeyama (仏山 聖司, Hotokeyama Seiji)
Voiced by: Yasuyuki Kase (Japanese); Jonah Scott (English)
A detective for the Koizumi Police Force. He is a former classmate of Kyoichiro in middle school and assists the Yozakura family by hiding information on them.
Rinne Kitazato (北里りんね, Kitazato Rinne)
Voiced by: Yoshino Nanjō (Japanese); Kristen McGuire (English)
Asuka Hatoda (鳩田 飛鳥, Hatoda Asuka)
Voiced by: Akira Ishida (Japanese); Landon McDonald (English)

== Media ==
=== Manga ===
Written and illustrated by Hitsuji Gondaira, Mission: Yozakura Family was serialized in Shueisha's shōnen manga magazine Weekly Shōnen Jump from August 26, 2019, to January 20, 2025. Shueisha collected its chapters in 29 individual tankōbon volumes, released from February 4, 2020, to March 4, 2025.

Viz Media publishes the manga digitally in English on its Shonen Jump website. Shueisha also simultaneously publishes the series in English for free on the Manga Plus app and website. Viz Media started releasing the volumes in print on October 18, 2022.

=== Novels ===
In October 2022, as part of the manga series' third anniversary, it was announced that it would receive a novel adaptation. Titled Yozakura-san Chi no Daisakusen Yozakura-ka Kansatsu Nikki (夜桜さんちの大作戦 夜桜家観察日記), it was released on July 4, 2023. A second novel titled Yozakura-san Chi no Daisakusen Orusuban Daisakusen-hen (夜桜さんちの大作戦 おるすばん大作戦編) was released on April 4, 2024. A third novel titled Yozakura-san Chi no Daisakusen Hifumi to Alpha no Seichō Kiroku-hen (夜桜さんちの大作戦 ひふみとあるふぁの成長記録編) is set to be released on March 4, 2025.

=== Anime ===
In December 2022, it was announced that the manga would be adapted into an anime television series by Silver Link. The series was directed by Mirai Minato, who also oversaw the scripts. Mizuki Takahashi served as the character designer and chief animation director. The music was composed by Kōji Fujimoto and Osamu Sasaki. It aired from April 7 to October 6, 2024, in the Nichigo time slot on all JNN affiliates, including MBS and TBS. The first opening song is "Unmei-chan" (運命ちゃん; lit. 'Fate'), performed by Ikimonogakari, while the first ending song is "Fam!", performed by Chico. The second opening song is "Secret Operation", performed by fripSide feat. Yoshino Nanjō, while the second ending song is "Kekkon Kōshin Kyoku" (結婚行進曲; lit. 'Marriage Parade Song'), performed by ASOBI Doumei. The series is streaming on Hulu in the United States and Disney+ in selected territories. The English dub premiered on Hulu on June 17, 2024.

Following the airing of the final episode, a second season was announced. The staff and cast from the first season reprised their roles. Mirai Minato served as the season's chief director, with Takahiro Nakatsugawa joining as director and Kōji Fujimoto returning as the sole composer. The season is set to run for two split cours; the first cours aired from April 12 to June 28, 2026, and the second cours premiered on October 11 of the same year. The first opening song is "What's 'Kazoku'?", performed by Sakurazaka46, while the first ending song is "Shalala", performed by Pilaf Alien. The second opening song is "Forever Song" (フォーエバーソング), performed by Humbreaders, while the second ending song is "I'm Still Breathing", performed by Kid Phenomenon.

==== Episodes ====
===== Season 1 (2024) =====
No. overall	No. in season	Title	Directed by	Written by	Storyboarded by	Original release date
1	1	"The Cherry Blossom Ring"; Transliteration: "Sakura no Yubiwa" (Japanese: 桜の指輪)	Mirai Minato	Mirai Minato	Mirai Minato	April 7, 2024
After losing his family, all Taiyo Asano had left was his childhood friend Mutsumi Yozakura. One day while in class, Taiyo is summoned by Vice Principal Hirukawa, who tries to murder him. Taiyo is suddenly rescued by Mutsumi and five other people. It is then revealed Mutsumi is the secret head of the Yozakura family, the world's greatest spy family, the five people are her siblings and Mr. Hirukawa is actually the sixth and eldest sibling Kyoichiro, the best spy in the world. Due to a childhood incident where he nearly killed Mutsumi, Kyoichiro became obsessed with her safety and has classified Taiyo as a danger. As Kyoichiro is too powerful, the siblings insist Taiyo must marry Mutsumi, making him off limits as a murder target. Kyoichiro arrives boasting of his goal to completely isolate Mutsumi in the Yozakura house forever. Unable to stand Kyoichiro's selfishness, Taiyo agrees to marry Mutsumi, who throws him a Yozakura crest wedding ring. Kyoichiro tries to stop them with his weapon Steel Spider, steel threads that cut through anything. While it almost severs his fingers, Taiyo successfully puts on the ring and becomes Mitsumi's husband.
2	2	"The Yozakuras' Lifeline"; Transliteration: "Yozakura no Inochi" (Japanese: 夜桜の命)	Takahiro Nakatsugawa	Mirai Minato	Takahiro Nakatsugawa	April 14, 2024
Taiyo returns home but is awoken the following morning by Kyoichiro trying to kill him again, claiming it is training to become a Yozakura spy. He then drags both Taiyo and Mitsumi from the house seconds before it explodes. He reveals as head of the family, Mitsumi's marriage has drawn attention from the criminal underworld. The Yozakuras' superhuman abilities lay in their genetics and despite having no abilities herself, Mutsumi's children will be the next superhumans, which their enemies wish to prevent. Kyoichiro gives Taiyo a gun to protect Mutsumi from Tamaya, a social media addicted bomber. Despite Tamaya posting constant updates, Taiyo cannot locate Tamaya or his bombs. He wonders if he is a suitable husband but Mutsumi assures him she has wanted him to be her husband since they were young. Taiyo realizes Tamaya planted a bomb in his jacket so he jumps from the window to get it away from Mutsumi. Kyoichiro begrudgingly disables the bomb in midair. The other siblings, having been observing Taiyo complete his first mission, capture Tamaya whom Kyoichiro punishes with his own bomb. Kyoichiro is furious when Mutsumi moves Taiyo into the Yozakura house.
3	3	"Feelings"; Transliteration: "Kimochi" (Japanese: 気持ち)	Masahiro Hosoda	Nanami Hoshino	Masahiro Hosoda	April 21, 2024
Taiyo struggles to adapt to life in the Yozakura house since it is filled with deadly traps he must avoid or disable in order to do simple tasks. Upset by his weakness, Taiyo asks Mutsumi's martial artist sister Futaba to train him. She agrees but only if he can survive the house on his own for one month first. Taiyo applies himself to surviving the house and struggles so much Kyoichiro even stops attacking him as he finds Taiyo's pain amusing to watch. As time passes, the house teaches Taiyo agility, marksmanship, poison resistance, codebreaking, analytical thinking, increased strength and stamina. By week three, he learns to move around the house with ease, impressing Mutsumi and her siblings until he suddenly collapses and is diagnosed with fatigue by scientist sibling Nanao, earning a scolding from Futaba as he had been concealing his extensive injuries under fake skin supplied by disguise expert sibling Kengo. Nevertheless, she is impressed by his progress and with the month over she agrees to start his real training, starting with increasing the house's danger level from beginner to moderate. Kyoichiro is also impressed but refuses to admit it.
4	4	"Kengo" (Japanese: 嫌五)	Yamato Ouchi	Nanami Hoshino	Hiroaki Yoshikawa	April 28, 2024
4	4	"Shinzo"; Transliteration: "Shinzō" (Japanese: 辛三)	Yamato Ouchi	Nanami Hoshino	Hiroaki Yoshikawa	April 28, 2024
Kengo begins teaching Taiyo about disguises, leading to a misunderstanding with Mutsumi. Weapon specialist sibling Shinzo then gives Taiyo a gift before setting off to take down money counterfeiters. Mutsumi warns Taiyo his increasing abilities are unintentionally scaring their classmates. Mutsumi later notices Kengo's mission paperwork is missing, so she enlists Taiyo's help to hunt him down. Eventually, Mutsumi realizes Taiyo is actually Kengo in disguise, having replaced Taiyo halfway through the search. Now caught, Kengo submits his paperwork properly. Mutsumi takes steps to punish Kyoichiro for the secret pictures of her she found in his room while hunting Kengo. Shinzo suddenly calls for help, having run out of bullets on his mission and unable to continue fighting unarmed. Taiyo volunteers to go and successfully infiltrates the counterfeiters' warehouse with Shinzo's gift, a gun that fires non-lethal shock bullets. Together they ruin the counterfeiting operation, though Taiyo is shot in the leg during their escape. Feeling ashamed, Shinzo decides to get over his fear of being unarmed so Taiyo will not get hurt next time. Later, a sinister man with Taiyo's photograph interrogates the surviving counterfeiters for their employer's identity.
5	5	"Interrogation"; Transliteration: "Torishirabe" (Japanese: 取り調べ)	Takahiro Nakatsugawa	Akira Nishikubo	Masafumi Tamura	May 5, 2024
5	5	"Date"; Transliteration: "Dēto" (Japanese: デート)	Takahiro Nakatsugawa	Akira Nishikubo	Masafumi Tamura	May 5, 2024
The sinister man, detective Seiji Hotokeyama, arrests Taiyo and interrogates him about the Yozakura family. Taiyo refuses to talk, even when Hotokeyama threatens to kill him, and it is eventually revealed to be a test from Kyoichiro as Hotokeyama is actually their police ally who covers up the Yozakuras' activities. Later, Kyoichiro takes over Taiyo and Mutsumi's class where he attacks Taiyo without the other students noticing, teaching him how to stay alert even when affected by sleeping gas. Mutsumi worries when Taiyo later develops a sleepwalking problem. Taiyo soon feels that he is neglecting Mutsumi and tries to ask her on a date but Hotokeyama interrupts with a job to find a pair of gun smugglers at an amusement park. Mutsumi goes too and they spend their date spying on three seemingly suspicious couples. When none of them are guilty, Taiyo buys Mutsumi a rose only for the smugglers to reveal themselves as the fourth couple Taiyo had ignored. Having ended their relationship, they try to shoot each other, forcing Taiyo to apprehend them. Despite the rose being damaged, Mutsumi is thrilled to receive it. Meanwhile, Kyoichiro is furious their date went well.
6	6	"Bug"; Transliteration: "Bagu" (Japanese: バグ)	Mirai Minato	Akira Nishikubo	Mirai Minato	May 12, 2024
Computer expert sibling Shion fails to prevent a hacker from stealing Taiyo's file. Taiyo is later attacked by Ayaka Kirisaki, a disturbed needle-wielding assassin, and since hacking his file she has chosen Taiyo as her next victim for his high bounty. Before she leaves, she reveals Kyoichiro allowed her target to Taiyo since he cannot do it himself. The next day, Ayaka transfers into Taiyo's class to try kill him up close but with his new skills he narrowly survives each time, increasing her obsession with him. Eventually, another assassin tries to kill Taiyo for the bounty and Mutsumi ends up saving Ayaka. Ayaka immediately falls in love with Mutsumi and is determined to assassinate Taiyo so she can marry Mutsumi instead. Later, Shion asks Taiyo to test her latest computer game, though it soon becomes clear the game is just a tool disguising Shion's online missions. By playing her game, Taiyo helps prevent a real life train crash and with unexpected hacking assistance from Ayaka prevents terrorists from blowing up a power plant. Impressed, Shion forces Taiyo to help her with more game missions without sleep for three consecutive days.
7	7	"Government Spies"; Transliteration: "Kōmuin Supai" (Japanese: 公務員スパイ)	Misaki Nishimoto	Kento Shimoyama	Hiroaki Yoshikawa	May 19, 2024
Nanao shuts down an evil laboratory and swallows the deadly virus they created so his superhuman stomach can destroy it. As this will leave him unconscious for three hours, he calls Taiyo to assist him. At the lab, Taiyo encounters Hinagiku government spies Sui Aoi and Oga Inugami. At first they work together until Taiyo learns their plan to destroy the virus involves killing Nanao. Without hesitating, Sui cuts Taiyo down with a highly skilled sword move but Nanao finally awakens with proof his stomach eliminated all the virus. After they make it home, Kyoichiro comically punishes Taiyo for shaming the Yozakuras' reputation in the underworld and orders him to defeat Sui like a real spy. Taiyo spends days following Sui everywhere but every time Sui uses his sword move to strip Taiyo naked in public. As time passes, Taiyo starts to learn from observing and even begins to decipher Sui's sword move, which always starts with a strike to the chest. After ten days of observation, he successfully dodges Sui's attack. Sui grudgingly admits Taiyo has potential. Taiyo returns home victorious only to learn his reputation is once again sullied by rumors he is a pervert.
8	8	"The Kuroyuri Party"; Transliteration: "Kuroyuri tō" (Japanese: 黒百合党)	Yasuo Ejima	Kento Shimoyama	Hiroaki Yoshikawa	May 26, 2024
Mutsumi takes Taiyo to meet the boss of the Hinagiku, Rin Fudo, once a classmate of Kyoichiro's. Rin considers Mutsumi like her own sister and is unimpressed with Taiyo, not believing he can protect Mutsumi. Kyoichiro soon breaks into the building to get Mutsumi back and battles Rin. Taiyo instinctively protects Mutsumi and is punched by both Kyoichiro and Rin yet survives, impressing Rin. As such, she asks Taiyo to investigate Yoshimasu Kuroyuri, a flamboyant, popular but corrupt politician aiming to become Prime Minister. Rin suspects he purchased bombs for an assassination but requires evidence. A disguised Taiyo witnesses Yoshimasu's corrupt activities carried out by his bodyguards, triplet spy brothers Red, Blue and Yellow, yet he can never gather any actual evidence. Eventually, he realizes Yoshimasu's constant dancing is actually Morse code to secretly communicate with the triplets and it becomes easy to decipher his plan to blow up Deputy Prime Minister Shirasagi. Taiyo thwarts the plan and Yoshimasu is arrested by Sui while the triplets flee the scene. Yoshimasu taunts Taiyo by suggesting his parents and brother's death was not an accident but an assassination.
9	9	"The Flower Meaning of Kuroyuri (Black Lily)"; Transliteration: "Kuroyuri no Hanakotoba" (Japanese: 黒百合 の花言葉)	Kazuhito Ōmiya	Kento Shimoyama	Hiroaki Yoshikawa	June 2, 2024
Sui suddenly calls Taiyo to tell him Shirasagi was kidnapped. Yoshimasu uses another bomb to escape. At the Yozakura house, the siblings, except Kyoichiro, all worry about Taiyo. Sui decides to inform Taiyo that Yoshimasu is actually a legendary spy called Kurogao. Kurogao suddenly appears on television with the kidnapped Shirasagi and demands he confess his crimes to the public. Taiyo stops the broadcast but is defeated by Kurogao's knowledge of his Yozakura techniques. He explains to Taiyo that six years ago, Shirasagi and other corrupt politicians tried to assassinate him but only succeeded in killing his daughter Yuri. For revenge, he targeted them as Yoshimasu. Despite knowing the pain of losing his family, Taiyo decides to stop him. Meanwhile, Sui easily defeats the triplets but panics as his instincts suddenly detect a terrifying presence nearby. Kurogao is captured when Taiyo suddenly switches from Yozakura techniques to Sui's signature sword style, Walking on Flowers, which Taiyo has now mastered. Out of respect, Kurogao decides to tell Taiyo about his family, but he is suddenly shot by an unseen person. Before dying, he passes Taiyo a map to Yuri's grave where Taiyo retrieves a hidden box before returning home.
10	10	"The Yozakura Family Maid"; Transliteration: "Yozakura no Meido" (Japanese: 夜桜のメイド)	Polon	Michiko Yokote	Mirai Minato	June 9, 2024
10	10	"Affair"; Transliteration: "Uwaki" (Japanese: 浮気)	Polon	Michiko Yokote	Mirai Minato	June 9, 2024
Rin hosts a dinner to celebrate Taiyo's success. Sui warns Taiyo to continue practicing Walking on Flowers as improper use can cripple a person's legs. When Taiyo shares his fear with Mutsumi, she kisses him on the cheek to reassure him and Taiyo finds the box contains a glass marble. Kyoichiro explains it is an optical drive with information laser engraved inside. They return home where Taiyo learns Mutsumi has hired Ayaka as the Yozakuras' maid, and to teach him anti-assassination skills. Shion starts decoding the drive but notes it is old and damaged. Ayaka's attempt to kill Taiyo in his bath causes a misunderstanding with Kyoichiro. Ayaka later notices Taiyo behaving unusually and concludes he is cheating on Mutsumi. Mutsumi has Taiyo walk Goliath, the Yozakuras' 100-year-old artificially bred spy dog who hates Taiyo as much as Kyoichiro. A bomber called Happy the Clown targets them and Taiyo is hurt protecting both Mutsumi and Goliath. Goliath hunts and punishes Happy and afterwards is nicer to Taiyo. Ayaka and Kyoichiro confront Taiyo only to learn Taiyo was actually working with the Hinagiku to procure Dark Sweet, the rarest tea in the world and Kyoichiro's favorite.
11	11	"Yozakura Ghost Stories"; Transliteration: "Yozakura no Kaidan" (Japanese: 夜桜の怪談)	Takahiro Nakatsugawa	Akira Nishikubo	Takahiro Nakatsugawa	June 16, 2024
11	11	"Spy License"; Transliteration: "Supai Menkyoshō" (Japanese: スパイ免許証)	Takahiro Nakatsugawa	Akira Nishikubo	Takahiro Nakatsugawa	June 16, 2024
When Taiyo learns about spy licences from Mutsumi and Futaba, he decides to take the exam too. A glitch on Shion's computer resembling a ghost terrifies Futaba, who has a phobia of anything she cannot defeat with martial arts. The entire family must babysit her for 24 hours, even though she keeps panicking at unexplained noises. In private, she tells Taiyo she fears being helpless when her family need her. During the exam, Taiyo is saved from a bounty hunter by Tsukiyo Hoshifuru, a bisexual playboy spy infatuated with Taiyo. During the final, the examinees must collect their licences before the building collapses. The bounty hunter sabotages Taiyo but he is assisted by Hoshifuru, who sacrifices his own victory so Taiyo can continue. Taiyo instead rescues Hoshifuru, who reveals he is actually the chief examiner. For his display of humanity, Taiyo receives his licence while the bounty hunter is disqualified. At home, Futaba punishes Kyoichiro after discovering the noises scaring her were him building secret rooms in the walls to further spy on Mutsumi. Everyone then takes a commemorative photo.
12	12	"Prison Break Grandpa"; Transliteration: "Purizun Jiji Bureiku" (Japanese: プリズンジジブレイク)	Masahiro Hosoda	Nanami Hoshino	Keisuke Inoue	June 23, 2024
An elderly man escapes from prison and infiltrates the Yozakura house, revealing himself as the siblings grandfather Ban. For years, he has posed as a prisoner to gather information for the police. However, due to being a reckless womanizer, Hotokeyama demands he return to prison. Ban escapes with Taiyo to bond with his new grandson-in-law. He reveals he married into the Yozakura family like Taiyo did and is impressed by his dedication to Mutsumi. Ban is suddenly captured by his wife Keiko, Mutsumi's grandmother, who knew he would escape prison for their anniversary. After going on a date together, Ban is returned to prison but breaks out again to spend more time with his grandchildren. However, they are out shopping already. Taiyo learns the local mall is actually a secret black market store. There, Taiyo encounters a young girl named Suzu whose father was just taken to the underground section of the store. Taiyo saves Suzu's father from an organ harvester but is himself targeted by a mob for the bounty on his head. While rescuing him, the siblings destroy the underground, causing the entire mall to collapse. Regardless, they decided to shop there again.
13	13	"Tanpopo" (Japanese: タンポポ)	Misaki Nishimoto	Kento Shimoyama	Mirai Minato	June 30, 2024
Shion decodes the optical drive and finds it is a guest list for the wedding of the siblings parents, which includes Taiyo's parents Hide and Akari, implying they had a connection with spies. Shion sends Taiyo to the Library of the Dead, an organization that safeguards all known information on deceased spies, watched over by Me-chan, an assassin librarian who murders anyone that makes a single sound. Taiyo discovers a file on his family that records them as being assassinated by a group called Tanpopo. His unauthorized access causes the file to self-destruct and he narrowly avoids being assassinated by Me-chan. Kyoichiro is furious as Tanpopo also assassinated his mother Rei. After learning Tanpopo assassinated Hide, a pharmaceutical worker, Kyoichiro finds a pattern of assassinations in the medical field all linked to medical director Makoto Kawashita. A disguised Taiyo and Mutsumi infiltrate the Kawashita Clinic and discover on Makoto's laptop Tanpopo plans to create a drug to give anyone Yozakura-style superpowers, which requires harvesting Mutsumi's heart. Makoto almost kills Taiyo and is surprised he survived the car crash that killed his family. Makoto then vanishes with the laptop, unaware Taiyo already stole the files from it.
14	14	"Aim for the Suite Room"; Transliteration: "Mezase Suītorūmu" (Japanese: 目指せスイートルーム)	Yamato Ouchi	Kento Shimoyama	Miyana Okita	July 7, 2024
With the stolen files, Taiyo links Tanpopo to Hotel Dandy Lion. Overnight, Kyoichiro kidnaps Taiyo to the middle of the ocean. The former forces the latter to fight a dozen assassins while disarming a torpedo fired from an actual Tanpopo submarine to demonstrate some of the difficulties he will face. Kyoichiro reveals that taking on Tanpopo requires having at least a five star Gold-ranked spy license, while Taiyo is still only Bronze rank. Despite this, Taiyo insists on fighting Tanpopo as long as they are a threat to Mutsumi. Having seen Taiyo's resolve, Kyoichiro confirms Makoto owns a suite at the Dandy Lion. Futaba is suspicious of Kyoichiro's motive in involving Taiyo with an enemy like Tanpopo, though he insists he is only helping Taiyo avenge his family. Taiyo infiltrates the Dandy Lion but Makoto escapes again. Taiyo is then forced to fight Nohmen, Dandy Lion's owner enhanced by Hazakura, Makoto's experimental drug to mimic the Yozakuras' abilities. Powerless against Nohmen's super strength and rapid healing, Taiyo almost dies but is saved by the timely arrival of Shinzo.
15	15	"Yozakura Blood"; Transliteration: "Yozakura no Chi" (Japanese: 夜桜の血)	Kazuhito Ōmiya	Kento Shimoyama	Gōichi Iwahata	July 14, 2024
Shinzo throws Taiyo out of the window to safety and faces Nohman alone, though he is hampered when Nohmen reveals a dead man's switch in his teeth. Taiyo poses as a terrorist to ensure the civilians evacuate. Meanwhile, an elderly man infiltrates the hotel. With the civilians gone, Shinzo uses a prototype electric rocket launcher, rendering Nohmen unconscious. Taiyo encounters the elderly man but thinks nothing of it until Shinzo arrives and realizes Taiyo has been expertly shot multiple times. Thanks to emergency surgery, Taiyo barely survives. Based on his injuries, Shinzo deduces only one spy could have been responsible. Over a thousand intruders suddenly attack the Yozakura mansion, all empowered by Hazakura and led by Tanpopo's Captain Yama. The Yozakuras battle them outside but Yama knocks out Goliath and makes it inside the mansion. Kyoichiro is shocked when the elderly man hacks into the mansion and activates its highest security setting, Hibernation, trapping the siblings outside and Yama inside with Mutsumi and Taiyo. Hibernation can only be deactivated with Mutsumi's ring, so to get back inside, Kyoichiro decides to retrieve the previous head's ring by leaving to confront the elderly man.
16	16	"Clearing the Yard"; Transliteration: "Niwa Soji" (Japanese: 庭掃除)	Mirai Minato	Kento Shimoyama	Gōichi Iwahata	July 21, 2024
Kyoichiro confronts the elderly man, revealed to be Momo, the siblings' father. Meanwhile, Mutsumi transfuses her blood into the weakening Taiyo so the Someinine from her heart can heal him. Yama nearly grabs Mutsumi but Taiyo awakens with the Yozakura crest in his right eye. With the Someinine, Taiyo begins to develop Yozakura superpowers but struggles with the stress on his brain. Mutsumi helps him focus until Yama pushes her aside. Enraged, Taiyo kills Yama with a single punch. Kyoichiro deduces Momo manipulated the situation so Mutsumi would give Taiyo Yozakura-style abilities. Momo admits he did so to ensure Mutsumi had a husband who could protect her. With this achieved, he turns to leave but Kyoichiro attempts to kill him with an attack so powerful his Steel Spider cut down the forest. Elsewhere, the siblings clear out Tanpopo's army. Momo survives Kyoichiro's attack due to his even greater mastery of Steel Spider and escapes, though Kyoichiro does retrieve Momo's ring. Taiyo goes berserk from Someinine Hyperactivity, a common ailment among Yozakura infants, so Kyoichiro pacifies him with Mutsumi singing directly into Taiyo's ears. Futaba is surprised Kyoichiro chose such a gentle method, which Kyoichiro denies.
17	17	"Nanao's Medicine"; Transliteration: "Nanao no Kusuri" (Japanese: 七悪のくすり)	Takahiro Nakatsugawa	Akira Nishikubo	Takahiro Nakatsugawa	July 28, 2024
Taiyo insists on returning to school. Nanao accompanies him by taking a drug to stabilize his body, returning him to his real appearance, a short boy with silver hair. Taiyo is surprised to learn in this body, Nanao attends school as a normal student, has several friends and even a crush on the head of the biology club, Rinne Kitasato. When Nanao starts to mutate again, he concludes that he must take a permanent vaccine that will mutate him forever. Taiyo stops him and endeavors to help Nanao himself with a tranquilizer gun. Kitasato's pet snake Basilisk eventually eats one of Nanao's drugs and mutates into a monster. Nanao feeds Basilisk his blood to safely return him back to normal. He then decides it will be best for everyone to stop attending school and mutate himself permanently. After Taiyo prevents this, they are seen by Kitasato, who convinces herself Nanao is capable of metamorphosis. She also forces Taiyo to join the biology club. Returning home, Taiyo and Nanao find Mutsumi, while attempting to make snacks to help Taiyo's Someinine Hyperactivity, has poisoned everyone. Nanao gets to work mixing an antidote.
18	18	"Yozakura Hot Spring Story"; Transliteration: "Yozakura Onsen Monogatari" (Japanese: 夜桜温泉物語)	Mirai Minato	Mirai Minato	Manabu Ono	August 4, 2024
While Taiyo begins training his new abilities, Mutsumi reveals she has won tickets to an underworld hot spring. She then invites everyone except Kyoichiro, who has a mission abroad. Arriving at the inn's secret location, Taiyo realizes every guest is either a spy or criminal. Fortunately, the inn forbids violence within its walls, strictly enforced by the hostess, Emma. Futaba advises Mutsumi to tell Taiyo something she has been hiding. A former yakuza boss later pours beer over Futaba in revenge for her destroying his career. Futaba instantly becomes drunk and the siblings rush to stop her. Left alone in the chaos, Mutsumi invites Taiyo to bathe together in private. Meanwhile, Kyoichiro arrives having finished work early. A naked Mutsumi shows Taiyo a surgical scar where Tanpopo very nearly removed her heart years prior. She also reveals how it was Momo's fault she had to give him Yozakura-style abilities but does not know why. Seeing she is upset, Taiyo suggests finding Momo to ask him. Kyoichiro soon interrupts them and is ready to kill Taiyo. To stop him, the siblings start an all-night pillow fight that includes every guest who wants revenge on Kyoichiro.
19	19	"A Drug Called Tanpopo"; Transliteration: "Tanpopo to iu Kusuri" (Japanese: タンポポという薬)	Yamato Ouchi	Nanami Hoshino	Kiyotaka Takezawa	August 11, 2024
Sui and Oga attempt to capture Makoto but find only an empty warehouse that explodes. Meanwhile, the siblings attempt to trace Tanpopo's Hazakura supply lines. Taiyo investigates a train as a possible supply line, unaware Makoto and Momo are hiding on board. When he drops his revolver, a silver haired woman named Shirai catches it through her window and returns it to him. Taiyo deduces the train engine has been modified to not produce smoke and yet there is a hallucinatory gas everywhere so he destroys the windows, revealing Makoto and Momo. Via GPS, Shion sees Taiyo confronting Momo so Futaba begins plans to catch the train. Shirai restrains Taiyo with her hair she can manipulate, revealing she is Makoto's greatest test subject. Makoto then demands they fight before he leaves with Momo. Shirai reveals Hazakura grants power but limits the user's lifespan to ten years, so she is going to die soon, and unless Taiyo stops her and the Hazakura loaded on the train, Tanpopo will consume everything, including Mutsumi. As her hair resists his electric bullets, Taiyo activates his revolver's second form, the electric katana Rain.
20	20	"Sun Earrings"; Transliteration: "Taiyō no Piasu" (Japanese: 太陽のピアス)	Hiroaki Takagi	Nanami Hoshino	Hiroaki Takagi	August 18, 2024
During the fight, Taiyo notices Shirai spelling out words with her hair, confessing she caused the death of his family. Many years ago, she was terminally ill and grew close to the Asanos. When Makoto cured Shirai, he revealed to her that he had been secretly injecting Hazakura into patients but she was the only one to survive with 100% compatibility. He then had the Asanos killed. Her only memento are the sun earrings the Asanos gave her, which contain a tracking device that can be used to find Tanpopo. Having told him this, Taiyo furiously continues the fight. Momo realizes Taiyo is close to death before he is impressed Taiyo cut himself to bleed out the excess Someinine. With his final attack, he cuts Shirai's hair. Holding her as she dies, Taiyo reveals his parents used to talk about her like she was their daughter. Before he can stop the train, Taiyo is ambushed by Ai, a Hazakura enhanced dog-like child, and Mizuki, a Hazakura enhanced poison user. He is saved by Futaba and Rin, who violently derail the train as Mizuki and Ai retrieve Shirai's body. Meanwhile, Futaba is impressed by what Taiyo managed to accomplish.
21	21	"Yozakura Front Lines"; Transliteration: "Yozakura Zensen" (Japanese: 夜桜前線)	Masahito Otani	Misaki Morie	Keisuke Gōda	August 25, 2024
21	21	"The Blooming"; Transliteration: "Kaika" (Japanese: 開花)	Masahito Otani	Misaki Morie	Keisuke Gōda	August 25, 2024
Rin uses Shirai's earring to track Tanpopo to Skeleton Island. Kyoichiro announces the Yozakura Front Lines, an all-out attack utilizing every Yozakura asset. Ban breaks out of prison to train Taiyo. It is revealed Rin and her Hinagiku soldiers were all Hazakura test subjects. Meanwhile, Nanao suspects he can cure Hazakura, Kengo acquires a device from a weapons developer, Shinzo begins building a weapon designed by their mother, and Futaba acquires help from the Spy Association. Ban explains the Yozakura Blooming, which grants an overpowered skill specific to each user. To unlock Taiyo's Blooming, Ban shoots Mutsumi. When Taiyo jumps in front of her, his Blooming is revealed to be the Hardening ability. Ban explains Mutsumi was in on the plan, much to Keiko's anger. Keiko later shows Mutsumi a hidden bunker containing the entire written history of the Yozakuras including the Book of Buds, which tells how the Yozakura family began. The secret to open the diary was lost generations ago and trying to force it open will automatically destroy the mansion. Keiko explains should the Yozakuras ever be utterly defeated, it will be Mutsumi's final responsibility to force the diary open.
22	22	"Cherry Blossom Viewing Party"; Transliteration: "O Hana mi" (Japanese: お花見)	Yamato Ouchi	Nanami Hoshino	Hideyo Yamamoto	September 1, 2024
The Yozakuras and their friends hold the Yozakura Banquet, a tradition before going to war. Taiyo notices his Blooming react to a cherry blossom tree which Keiko reveals is Tennou, the tree planted by the first family head. Containing traces of Someinine, the scent from the leaves can resonate with Yozakura blood for healing and mental wellbeing. As the Yozakuras have fun, Tanpopo also celebrate as their great Seed-Sowing Project will begin tomorrow. After the banquet, Mutsumi goes over their goals: arrest Makoto, destroy the Hazakura drugs, rescue any imprisoned test subjects and capture Momo. Kyoichiro takes Taiyo aside and shows him his mother's empty grave, revealing her body is being held by Tanpopo. As his siblings are unaware of this, he asks Taiyo to help him discreetly retrieve her body. The next morning, they infiltrate Skeleton Island by helicopter and immediately confront Akai, a Hazakura enhanced Pyrokinetic, but her flames are dispersed by Futaba's martial arts. Kengo and Nanao search for the test subjects while Kyoichiro, Taiyo, and Shinzo search for Makoto. Hinagiku and the Spy Association surround the island and Futaba sends Goliath to take out Tanpopo's regular soldiers while she duels Akai.
23	23	"Easterly Wind"; Transliteration: "Kochi" (Japanese: 東風)	Takahiro Nakatsugawa	Michiko Yokote	Gōichi Iwahata	September 8, 2024
23	23	"Weapon"; Transliteration: "Buki" (Japanese: 武器)	Takahiro Nakatsugawa	Michiko Yokote	Gōichi Iwahata	September 8, 2024
Shinzo fights Kurosawa, whose body is made of liquid metal. Akai activates Hazakura Blooming, turning her flames into concentrated heat rays. Makoto recalls finding Akai after her family were murdered by an arsonist, so he revived her with her deceased siblings' organs. Futaba activates her Blooming, which improves her vision and hand-eye coordination. Makoto warns Akai to calm down but she furiously goes beyond her limit and almost burns herself to death. However, Futaba prevents this by knocking Akai unconscious. Elsewhere, Kengo and Nanao encounter Aonuma, who can manipulate ice. Kengo reveals the device from the weapons developer: balloons controlled from the inside by Steel Spider to act as Kengo clones. Deducing their strategy, Makoto redirects Aonuma to secure the power source and Kurosawa to murder the test subjects. To stop Kurosawa, Shinzo goes against Shion's orders and decides to use his Blooming, which is particularly dangerous. He also wields Turmeric, a weapon made of a formless alloy. As he activates his Blooming, he prays that he does not kill anyone again.
24	24	"Shion & Kengo vs. Chacha & Aonuma"; Transliteration: "Shion & Kengo VS Chacha & Aonuma" (Japanese: 四怨 & 嫌五 VS チャチャ & アオヌマ)	Yamato Ouchi	Michiko Yokote	Mirai Minato & Gōichi Iwahata	September 15, 2024
Shinzo breaks apart Kurosawa, revealing his Blooming enables him to see the weak point of any object and destroy it. Makoto then activates a dead man's switch, killing most of the test subjects and even his own men. Shion locates Tanpopo's Seed-Sowing Project and discovers they plan on blowing up the island to spill 2,000 tons of Hazakura into the sea, where it will eventually reach and devastate all of humanity. Shion is counter-hacked by Chacha, a Hazakura enhanced genius cyborg. Meanwhile, Kengo and his clones battle Aonuma by the power sources. Using Chacha's superiority complex against him, Shion floods his system with hundreds of his voice recordings, turning his orders to Aonuma into a confusing mess. Kengo uses his Blooming on Aonuma to read his mind, forcing him to remember Hako, an old homeless woman who froze to death after she gave him her coat. This disrupts Aonuma's Hazakura, melting his ice. Shion soon activates her Blooming, turning her brain into a supercomputer. Chacha's mind is trapped in cyberspace while Shion cripples his entire system. Taiyo and Kyoichiro reach the deepest level of the facility and confront Makoto.
25	25	"Ai and Mizuki"; Transliteration: "Ai to Mizuki" (Japanese: アイとミズキ)	Hidehiko Kadota	Kento Shimoyama	Hideyo Yamamoto	September 22, 2024
Kyoichiro reveals to Taiyo that Makoto has biometric implants and if they damage his body in any way, the island will explode. When Nanao is captured by Mizuki and Ai, Makoto gives Taiyo a choice: let Nanao die or attack him. Fortunately, Nanao is rescued by Sui and Oga, who have finally arrived with Hinagiku, the police and the Spy Association. Nanao activates his Blooming and neutralizes Mizuki's poison. Ai goes berserk but collapses from hyperactive shock. Mizuki transfuses all his Hazakura into her body at the cost of his own life. Shion soon deactivates the biometric implants allowing Taiyo and Kyoichiro to attack Makoto. While Kyoichiro severs Makoto's head, it reattaches itself to his body as the Yozakura crest blooms in his eyes. Kyoichiro explains Makoto is actually over 100 years old. Makoto then reveals that he researched the Yozakura bloodline on behalf of the Japanese government during World War II. He also reveals his Blooming allows him to store the DNA of his test subjects inside his body and create clones. He thus generates a monster made of said test subjects. Kyoichiro battles the monster and sends Taiyo after Makoto.
26	26	"Old Blood"; Transliteration: "Furui chi" (Japanese: 旧い血)	Mirai Minato	Kento Shimoyama	Miyana Okita	September 29, 2024
Taiyo stops Makoto from releasing the Hazakura but is stabbed by Makoto's poisoned blood. This causes him to see Makoto's memories of him experimenting on the first Yozakura head, Tsubomi Yozakura, a willing test subject who wished to be reborn as an ordinary human. Makoto reveals that for this to happen, he needed another Yozakura family head. However, he had to wait generations for the necessary technology to be developed. Taiyo's young Yozakura blood reacts with Makoto's older blood, causing a fatal allergic reaction. Another flashback shows Tsubomi gave Makoto her blood because she agreed with his plan to give the world superpowers. Through the shared resonance of their rings, Mutsumi feels Taiyo's heartbeat stop, so she resonates her own heartbeat back to him, boosting his Someinine to cure the poisoning. Before Makoto can stop him, Taiyo destroys the Hazakura tanks, causing it to harmlessly evaporate. Desperate, Makoto absorbs the Hazakura gas and plans to detonate his own body but the siblings finally arrive. Their first attacks do nothing and Makoto keeps progressing towards detonation. Taiyo suddenly spots something about Makoto, which he wordlessly communicates to Kyoichiro. As such, Kyoichiro announces a new tactic centered around Taiyo.
27	27	"Mission Complete"; Transliteration: "Sakusen Shūryō" (Japanese: 作戦終了)	Takahiro Nakatsugawa	Kento Shimoyama	Miyana Okita	October 6, 2024
27	27	"Reception"; Transliteration: "Hirōen" (Japanese: 披露宴)	Takahiro Nakatsugawa	Kento Shimoyama	Miyana Okita	October 6, 2024
Trusting Kyoichiro's plan, the siblings shoot Taiyo to a secret room under Makoto's feet. There, Taiyo finds the siblings' mother Rei in cryogenic storage, protected by a web of crystallized Someinine linking her to Makoto. Makoto gloats as breaking even one thread will cause a Someinine explosion. Taiyo tears apart every thread anyway before he activates his Hardening, surviving whilst protecting Rei's body. Makoto loses his powers and the Hazakura is harmlessly crystallized. Within Makoto's mind, Tsubomi promises to carry his research into the future. Taiyo and Kyoichiro retrieve Rei for burial at the mansion. Meanwhile, Ban confronts Momo as he tries to leave with Rei's heart, but Momo escapes. Returning home, Taiyo is surprised when the siblings throw him and Mutsumi a belated wedding reception. However, it is also a tradition for the head's new spouse to prove their worthiness by surviving an assassination attempt by the guests. Taiyo is soon spared when Futaba plays a recording left by Rei congratulating Mutsumi on her wedding. With the reception over, Taiyo takes part in the final Yozakura wedding tradition: walking Mutsumi down the aisle whilst shielding her from a barrage of bullets.

===== Season 2 (2026) =====
No. overall	No. in season	Title	Directed by	Written by	Storyboarded by	Original release date
Part 1
28	1	"Ai Comes to the Yozakura Family"; Transliteration: "Ai-san Yozakura-ka e" (Japanese: アイさん夜桜家へ)	Takahiro Nakatsugawa	Mirai Minato	Takahiro Nakatsugawa	April 12, 2026
28	1	"Mini Kyoichiro"; Transliteration: "Mini Kyōichirō" (Japanese: ミニ凶一郎)	Takahiro Nakatsugawa	Mirai Minato	Takahiro Nakatsugawa	April 12, 2026
Rin asks the Yozakuras to take in Ai from Tanpopo. Taiyo and Mutsumi naturally begin parenting her, with Ai warming to them just as quickly. Later, Ai is reminded of everyone in Tanpopo who died, especially Mizuki. Blaming herself, she runs away. Taiyo finds her, and as a fellow non-Yozakura assures her that it is alright to feel like an outsider, but that feeling will eventually be replaced by family. They return home where the siblings welcome her. Kyoichiro accidentally takes one of Nanao's experimental drugs and is regressed into a 6-year-old. Without adult memories, he is glad his siblings grew up happy. Mutsumi is thrilled Kyoichiro is sweet and purehearted again, so he spends all day playing with his siblings. That night, Kyoichiro reveals to Taiyo he already guessed his mother is dead, since he foresaw it happening when he really was 6, causing his overprotectiveness to develop. He is saddened he will become a man his family dislikes, but accepts he must do so if it keeps everyone safe. The next morning, Kyoichiro returns to normal, but with an unfamiliar warm feeling towards Taiyo. Elsewhere, Momo looks forward to seeing his family again.
29	2	"Winners and Losers"; Transliteration: "Kachigumi to Makegumi" (Japanese: 勝ち組と負け組)	Yamato Ouchi	Mirai Minato	Takahiro Nakatsugawa	April 19, 2026
Kyoichiro demands Taiyo take out a perverted spy at school. There, Taiyo begins inexplicably Blooming. Meanwhile, classmate Sosuke Michibata hates having a very weak presence, even if it makes him ideal for espionage. He often uses his invisibility to spy on girls and prank people he dislikes. Jealous Taiyo is married to Mutsumi, he tells the school newspaper they have a secret lovechild. Taiyo eventually finds Sosuke and admits he feels sympathy for him. An angered Sosuke tries to go fully invisible to shoot Taiyo, but Taiyo defeats him with his out-of-control Blooming. Sosuke apologizes for the newspaper, but Mutsumi punishes him for having secret pictures of her. Later, Shion is contacted by Kenji, a 7th grader and expert data collector she promised to take to the black market. Kenji insists it is a date, which Shion denies due to his age, yet for some reason finds herself stressing about her outfit. Mutsumi and Sosuke offer to help, turning the whole thing into an impromptu fashion contest. After trying on several outfits, Shion picks normal comfortable clothes, yet becomes embarrassed when Kenji can still tell how much effort she put into choosing them.
30	3	"The Big Bro Shinzo Safety Watch Team"; Transliteration: "Shinzō Nii-chan Mimamoritai" (Japanese: 辛三兄ちゃん見守り隊)	Michiru Itabisashi	Mirai Minato	Hitoyuki Matsui	April 26, 2026
Shinzo goes shopping with Ayaka. Kengo and Nanao convince Taiyo to help spy on them, suspecting it is a date. Ayaka admits she respects Shinzo for helping his family despite being an introvert. Shinzo proceeds to punishes Taiyo, Kengo, and Nanao for spying on him. Taiyo later collapses and blood cherry blossoms begin sprouting from his skin, but a voice warns him to regain control, or the blossoms will consume him. Inside his head, he meets Tsubomi, who reveals her blood was transferred into him by Makoto. She asks Taiyo to kill her, first by opening the Book of Buds, and then by visiting Makoto in prison, which he can only do with a Silver spy license. She then implants in Taiyo's head the method of opening the book. After Taiyo does so, he asks to take the Silver rank exam. Shion warns him that it is always proctored by a Gold rank spy, and Taiyo could not have picked a worse year to take the exam as the upcoming proctor has never allowed anybody to pass. Taiyo attends the exam and meets Usa, a reporter for Spy Day magazine. Shinzo also attends the exam.
31	4	"Spy Advancement Exam"; Transliteration: "Supai Shōkaku Shiken" (Japanese: スパイ昇格試験)	Masahito Otani	Misaki Morie	Shiyo Hatsumida	May 3, 2026
It transpires Shinzo is in charge of Stage 1 of the exam. Shinzo then announces that anyone who touches him within three hours will pass. Shinzo immediately takes out a third of the examinees. Taiyo instructs the remaining examinees on Shinzo's weaknesses: bees, poison, and family. As Shinzo's Blooming can only target what he fears, he cannot target Taiyo, so Taiyo manages to touch him. While congratulating him, Taiyo suddenly restrains Shinzo, having promised to give the remaining examinees a chance to touch him. The next stage run by Futaba is a tea ceremony, except Futaba has infused her aiki into the tea, so anyone who drinks it carelessly will be blown away. The first to pass is Usa. Taiyo soon notices Futaba is using a sequence of stirring and turning the bowl as if she is securing her aiki behind a lock. As Usa recorded it, Taiyo realizes the solution is to do Futaba's sequence in reverse. Futaba reminisces about the progress Taiyo has made over the years. Once Taiyo drinks the tea and passes, he and the other successful examinees are dropped into a Steel Spider trap set by Kyoichiro.
32	5	"The Fruit of Love"; Transliteration: "Ai no Kesshō" (Japanese: 愛の結晶)	Masahiro Hosoda	Misaki Morie	Masahiro Hosoda	May 10, 2026
Kyoichiro reveals the goal is to remain calm to avoid snapping the threads. Everyone including Usa all fall as Kyoichiro reveals their most embarrassing secrets. Kyoichiro reveals he knows Taiyo opened the Book of Buds and asks why he has chosen to trust Tsubomi. Taiyo responds it is to protect Mutsumi. However, Kyoichiro refuses to let him pass, snapping the threads himself. Taiyo fights Kyoichiro directly, having received advice on how to deal with Steel Spider from the siblings. He gets so close to Kyoichiro that the latter uses his secret weapon, Arachne. Taiyo starts to fall but Tsubomi activates her blood within him and Taiyo manages to stop himself with Profuse Blooming. Kyoichiro warns him trying to contain the power will rip him apart, so he must let it out. For Mutsumi, Taiyo unleashes the power and cuts the building in half, managing to pierce one single hole through Arachne. Kyoichiro admits Taiyo has passed the exam but he has a long way to go to master Profuse Blooming. Watching from a distance, Momo decides it is time to visit his children.
33	6	"New Cherry Blossoms"; Transliteration: "Atarashii Sakura" (Japanese: 新しい桜)	Kidi	Nanami Hoshino	Hitoyuki Matsui	May 17, 2026
Taiyo visits Makoto in a high security spy prison, whose body has also begun to sprout blossoms. Makoto informs Taiyo how Tsubomi's Someinine is far more potent than in her descendants. He reveals the Book of Buds is written in ink made from Tsubomi's blood, and only someone with mastery of Profuse Blooming can read it. He also reveals the hosts of Tsubomi's blood can resonate with each other. Momo suddenly materializes behind Taiyo, planning to kill Makoto. The siblings instantly crash the prison and Kyoichiro reveals it was Momo that killed their mother and almost took Mutsumi's heart. Makoto reveals Momo is actually a copy of Tsubomi made of pure someinine crystals, the ultimate Profuse Blooming, and always intended to offer his wife and Mutsumi to Tsubomi. Momo regrets that for the future he seeks, he must be his children's enemy. Makoto reveals to master Profuse Blooming requires direct intervention by Tsubomi, so he tells Taiyo to absorb all Tsubomi's someinine inside him. Momo tries to stop them, but it is already too late. Makoto disintegrates and has an emotional farewell with Tsubomi before dying. Momo departs, promising to keep watching Taiyo as he grows.
34	7	"At the Old Yozakura Residence"; Transliteration: "Kyū Yozakura-tei Nite" (Japanese: 旧夜桜邸にて)	Masashi Tsunemitsu	Misaki Morie	Hitoyuki Matsui	May 24, 2026
Momo reports Makoto's death to Tsubomi, but she barely remembers him anymore. Mutsumi starts researching Profuse Blooming. Futaba discovers Taiyo's body is now mostly Someinine and can perform incredible feats of flexibility, durability, and brain power. Mutsumi admits Momo tried to talk to her, yet she sensed no threat from him. Using a worldwide scanner, Shion locates Momo's someinine signature at Ninomae Manor, the Yozakuras' former home, now a popular haunted house due to the ghost of Ninomae, Tsubomi's daughter. Shion, Futaba, Shinzo, and Taioyo visit at the same time as professional ghost hunters. When Shinzo vanishes, Futaba detects he was moved away at incredible speed by aiki. Taiyo finds a secret tree filled room with Shinzo battling the still alive Ninomae. Ninomae insists they are all fake Yozakuras as none of them possess Tsubomi's someinine. In a brutal fight that destroys the manor, Futaba barely survives Ninomae's aiki attack. With Tsubomi's trees destroyed, Ninomae departs to find more trees to reconnect to Tsubomi. In a nearby cemetery, they discover Ninomae's empty grave. Meanwhile, the ghost hunters try to upload footage they captured online, but are caught by Hotokeyama, who destroys their camera.
35	8	"Ai's Errand"; Transliteration: "Ai-san no Otsukai" (Japanese: アイさんのおつかい)	Michiru Itabisashi	Michiko Yokote	Shiyo Hatsumida	May 31, 2026
35	8	"Mutsumi's Major Diet Mission"; Transliteration: "Mutsumi Daietto Daisakusen" (Japanese: 六美ダイエット大作戦)	Michiru Itabisashi	Michiko Yokote	Shiyo Hatsumida	May 31, 2026
Ai notices the siblings are upset, so she volunteers to buy the meat for dinner. As this is her first solo errand, Taiyo and Mutsumi secretly follow her. Things go awry when the butcher is sold out of pork, so Ai decides to find some herself by hunting Ouka Buta boars. Taiyo struggles to keep up while also carrying Mutsumi. Reaching the Benizakura Mountains just before nightfall, Taiyo disguises himself as an elderly hunter to urge Ai to return home. Ai explains she wants the boar to make her family happy. As a result, Taiyo changes his mind. Ai eventually brings it home to a shocked Taiyo and Mutsumi, who were unaware Ouka Buta boars are the size of grizzly bears. Mutsumi discovers she has started to gain weight. Futaba and Shion are unable to offer any real advice. Shinzo's suggestion of extreme airsoft as an exercise regime is useless, as is Kengo's suggestion of enduring a 100 degree sauna for an hour. She refuses to even try Nanao's body shrinking drug. The next morning, Taiyo joins her on her daily run. Mutsumi eventually loses the weight, so the family celebrates with cake.
36	9	"Tsubomi & Mutsumi"; Transliteration: "Tsubomi to Mutsumi" (Japanese: つぼみと六美)	Masahito Otani	Michiko Yokote	Hiroaki Yoshikawa	June 7, 2026
Shion wonders if researching Ninomae might lead to Momo. The only record of her is the Ninomae Journal, which Ai finds stored with Mutsumi's embarrassing Taiyo merchandise collection. The journal mentions a Yozakura silk mill. Mutsumi is sent to bed with a fever while Taiyo, Kengo, Shinzo and Futaba investigate the mill and find the body of the fifth Yozakura head, Itsuwa. Itsuwa awakens wielding Black Cherry Blossoms. She then reveals the blossoms are Tsubomi's roots spread all across Japan, absorbing humans to prolong her life and resurrect the Yozakura heads to protect said roots. Itsuwa has no interest in serving Tsubomi and asks to be killed. Taiyo's ring warns him Mutsumi is in danger. Tsubomi sprouts from Itsuwa's body, revealing that with her own body withering, she planted seeds into her bloodline to cultivate an heir, resulting in Mutsumi. She begins absorbing Mutsumi to restore her own body. Itsuwa crushes Tsubomi, revealing only the heads are keeping Tsubomi alive so they must destroy them to wither the roots. Tsubomi begins draining the someinine from Taiyo, Kengo, Shinzo, and Futaba. Furious, Taiyo activates Amaterasu Chaotic Blooming and severs Itsuwa's roots, which causes Tsubomi to retreat.
37	10	"Refusal"; Transliteration: "Kyozetsu" (Japanese: 拒絶)	Takahiro Nakatsugawa	Kento Shimoyama	Koji Sawai	June 14, 2026
Kyoichiro leaves a note explaining he has run away. Taiyo faints and Nanao diagnoses him with De-Kyoichiro Syndrome. Mutsumi explains Kyoichiro often runs away for childish reasons, but always comes home. While out with Mutsumi, Taiyo has the feeling Momo was involved with Kyoichiro's disappearance. Shion confirms Kyoichiro hacked into her Momo tracking software. Futaba also realizes Kyoichiro took a precious family photograph with him. Meanwhile, Kyoichiro enters a cave in a forest and confronts Momo. Momo is surprised Kyoichiro wounded him, with Kyoichiro revealing he coated Steel Spider in Taiyo's someinine and Tsubomi's blood. Five previous Yozakura heads suddenly appear behind Kyoichiro. Kyoichiro recalls how he always thought of himself as Mutsumi's protector until the moment he realized she was protecting the family all along. Having restored the Momo tracking data he deleted, Shion locates Kyoichiro. Everyone is surprised Kyoichiro has already defeated the five heads. Taiyo tries to congratulate him, but Kyoichiro shreds the tip of Taiyo's finger. The siblings are shocked Kyoichiro broke their rule of never harming family. Kyoichiro reveals they will never be seeing him again as he along with the bodies of the five heads dissolve into cherry blossoms.
38	11	"Operation Search for the Eldest Son"; Transliteration: "Chōnan Sōsaku Saisakusen" (Japanese: 長男捜索大作戦)	Noriaki Akitaya & Geisei Morita	Kento Shimoyama	Hitoyuki Matsui	June 21, 2026
Mutsumi announces Operation Search for the Eldest Son. She discovers Kyoichiro left three previous missions incomplete, so his disappearance was a spur of the moment decision. Taiyo recalls that prior to Makoto's arrest, Kyoichiro secretly told him that if he disappeared or died, he was to take rice crackers to Spy Association headquarters and give them to the President. President Kai Izumo deduces Kyoichiro must have been under extreme stress. Taiyo is amazed when Kai reveals how brain damage caused his sensory nerves to overdevelop, so now he can absorb and understand vast amount of information. Kai claims the only Yozakura who can save Kyoichiro is Taiyo, but only if he confronts him directly with Profuse Blooming. Meanwhile, the siblings find and surround Kyoichiro. Kyoichiro sprouts Black Blossoms from his skin, revealing that when he defeated the five heads, Tsubomi's blood inside them infected him with her roots. As a result, he ran away in order to protect his siblings. Shion detects the roots are indeed killing him. Kyoichiro causes an explosion to escape again, but unexpectedly runs into Taiyo in full Profuse Blooming.
39	12	"Let's Be a Family Again"; Transliteration: "Kazoku ni Narou" (Japanese: 家族になろう)	Masahiro Hosoda	Kento Shimoyama	Masahiro Hosoda	June 28, 2026
Kyoichiro restrains Taiyo with the Someinine threads he used against the heads. Admitting Taiyo nearly caught him, Kyoichiro concedes he no longer needs to protect the former. Refusing to stop, Taiyo shreds his own skin to break free and grabs Kyoichiro's arm. Kyoichiro is shocked when Profuse Blooming destroys several roots. Taiyo realizes this is what Kai meant. Overcoming Steel Spider, Taiyo secures Kyoichiro in a bear hug, curing him. Futaba proceeds to slap Kyoichiro before Mutsumi arrives, who emotionally confronts Kyoichiro over what he did. Momo then appears, revealing to his children that with the heads defeated, Tsubomi has withered, allowing him to secretly rerouted her energy through her roots to resurrect Rei's heart. He also reveals she can be fully revived, but he requires their assistance to harvest energy by murdering potentially 100,000 more people with the roots. Horrified, Mutsumi cries while Taiyo confronts Momo for making his children suffer. Resisting a violent outburst, a delusional Momo leaves, confident they will eventually forgive him once their mother is alive again. The Yozakuras realize they must prepare for war or face the end of the family.
Part 2
40	13	"Family Restaurant Meeting with Dad"; Transliteration: "Famiresu Fushi Kaidan" (Japanese: ファミレス父子会談)	Hiroo Unezaki	Michiko Yokote	Hitoyuki Matsui	October 11, 2026
Kyoichiro receives 24 hours of family service, complying with all demands without complaint. Mutsumi fears feeling useless without her siblings, but Kyoichiro reassures her. Kyoichiro finally falls asleep, a rare occurrence since he uses an anti-sleep spell. It is revealed the family secretly worked together to nullify his spell via various means disguised as family service. Upon awakening, Kyoichiro discovers everyone wrote on his face but they framed Taiyo for it. Momo later invites Mutsumi and Taiyo to a restaurant. When Mutsumi questions his harsh transformation away from the caring father he once was, Momo accuses them of treating him with ungrateful hatred. Suddenly, every civilian in the restaurant drops dead; Momo reveals he used Someinine threads to harvest their life energy for Rei's heart. As the rest of the siblings arrive, a root monster Momo calls "Brother" erupts from the ground, enabling Momo's escape. Kyoichiro and Taiyo pursue Momo while Brother absorbs the fallen corpses to grow larger. Though Brother rapidly regenerates, Shion identifies its vital Someinine core. Shinzo destroys the core, and Futaba obliterates the body, halting its regeneration. Mutsumi is baffled why Momo called the monster his brother.
41	14	"The Gold Rank Spy Meeting"; Transliteration: "Kinkyū Kaigi" (Japanese: 金級会議)	Masashi Tsunemitsu	Michiko Yokote	Koji Sawai	October 18, 2026
Kyoichiro reminds Taiyo only Profuse Blooming can harm Momo. After being knocked down, Momo reveals he forced Tsubomi's body to produce hundreds of "Dark Cherries" to commit mass murder to harvest Someinine. He then escapes. Kai summons Kyoichiro, Taiyo, Shinzo, and Futaba to a meeting with five other Gold Ranks: Alexand, Shura, Giga, Dr. Mozu, Furan, and Kosmos. Kai reveals Momo is murdering spies and posting the videos online, prompting the government to request the Yozakuras' expulsion from the Spy Association. Kyoichiro threatens anyone voting to expel them and proposes a three-day deadline to arrest Momo to retain their membership. Taiyo is amazed when Kai cuts Steel Spider with a simple box cutter, which Kyoichiro explains is due to Kai's extreme vision targeting individual threads. Momo soon posts a new video revealing he has hidden Dark Cherries turned into bombs inside the Spy Association, with a one-hour timer. Because the Spy Association spans a vast underground tunnel network, its destruction would cause the city above it to collapse, killing millions of civilians. Deducing Dark Cherries can shapeshift, Kai orders the Gold Ranks to infiltrate the Spy Association and detain anyone suspicious.
42	15	"Objectives"; Transliteration: "Nerai" (Japanese: 狙い)	Masahiro Hosoda	Nanami Hoshino	Hitoyuki Matsui	October 25, 2026
Giga's scans detect no concealed bombs, meaning the Dark Cherries are carrying them. Alexand takes Taiyo and Shinzo to the Juvenile Department where orphans he rescues are trained as spies, as was Shinzo. Alexand seizes two children who look different than normal, and crushes the disguised Dark Cherries, though neither have bombs. Similarly, the others kill Dark Cherries in the Research Wing, Greenhouse and Cafeteria, though none are carrying bombs. Kyoichiro wonders if there is something else going on. In the Armory with Futaba, Shura recalls how her parents replaced 90% of her body with weapons technology until she killed them. When Futaba defeated her, Shura's human heart was reawakened and she fell in love with her. Kai is attacked by normal spies infected by Dark Cherry parasites, but he removes them with his boxcutter. Kyoichiro locates a bomb that releases more parasites. Kyoichiro soon realizes Momo lied to distract them. Momo appears at the Juvenile Department where Alexand and Taiyo attack him, but are stopped by Shinzo. It is revealed Momo staged everything to infect Shinzo and Futaba with the parasites. Momo escapes with Futaba and Shinzo protecting him. Kyoichiro drags Taiyo home for a family meeting.
43	16	"Making Soba Noodles"; Transliteration: "Soba-uchi" (Japanese: そば打ち)	Michiru Itabisashi	Mirai Minato	Koji Sawai	November 1, 2026
The remaining siblings prepare Black Cherry Blossom soba, a family recipe to restore energy. Mutsumi continues struggling to comprehend Momo's actions. After surviving the meal, Taiyo and Kengo head to the newly rebuilt Gaon Mall to buy computer parts for Shion. There, they face hostile spies and assassins who blame the Yozakuras for Momo murdering their friends until Furan, Kengo's mentor, intervenes and disperses the crowd. Taiyo deduces that Furan is far older than she looks. Discovering half the crowd is infected with Dark Cherries, Furan uses her Love Whip to discipline her former students, destroying the parasites. She humorously notes she quit instructing because her strict discipline began producing masochists instead of skilled spies. With the computer parts, Shion upgrades her own computer to hack into the world's top supercomputer owned by her rival Giga. Although Giga gleefully attempts to punish her intrusion, Shion turns the tables so successfully she accidentally uncovers Giga's true identity. Forced to bribe Shion to keep her identity hidden, Giga grants her full system access, allowing Shion to launch a much more comprehensive search for Momo across the planet.
44	17	"Mission: Sibling Retrieval"; Transliteration: "Kyōdai Dakkan Sakusen Kaishi" (Japanese: 姉弟奪還作戦開始)	Masahito Otani	Misaki Morie	Hitoyuki Matsui	November 8, 2026
To help Taiyo master Profuse Blooming, Kyoichiro trains him violently, while Kai uses a kinder approach of replicating Kyoichiro's movements and using an intense acupressure technique to boost Taiyo's physical capacity. Meanwhile, Shion tracks Momo to the Kaioumaru, a warship at sea. Joining forces with Kai and the Gold Ranks, the Yozakuras launch an attack on the vessel. Upon infiltrating, they discover the ship is constructed entirely from Dark Cherry parasites, allowing it to repair itself endlessly and launch unpredictable attacks. When Futaba creates a cyclone using Taijutsu, Kyoichiro pierces the hull so Taiyo, Kengo, and Nanao can slip inside before the parasites repair the gap. After Giga hacks the engines, Kyoichiro splits the group to head off Momo alone. Navigating the ship, Taiyo, Kengo and Nanao discover a grand ballroom where Momo has staged a family resurrection party for Rei. The team faces immediate conflict: Kyoichiro and Nanao battle Futaba, while Taiyo and Kengo tackle Shinzo into the engine room. They attempt to neutralize Shinzo's Dark Cherry infection with a high-potency antiparasitic drug, but it fails. As such, an angered Kengo swears to defeat Shinzo. In turn, Shinzo decides to start fighting seriously.
45	18	"Yozakura Family Feud"; Transliteration: "Yozakura Kyōdai Taiketsu" (Japanese: 夜桜兄妹対決)	Shun Kanno	Misaki Morie	Masahiro Hosoda	November 15, 2026
Kengo unleashes all his clone dolls to form a giant version of himself, punching Shinzo through the hull into the ocean. Grabbing Shinzo, Kengo uses Blooming Assimilation to enter his mind, finding Shinzo's recent memories repressed, leaving only happy childhood memories of Momo. Kengo fills the dark spots in Shinzo's memory with his own happy memories until Momo suddenly appears inside Shinzo's mind to stop him. Meanwhile, Futaba tells Kyoichiro to use his Blooming, but he refuses. Instead, he allows Shion and Nanao to fight Futaba. Confident her martial arts can easily defeat non-fighters, Futaba attacks. However, Shion's computers calculate ways to beat her while Nanao fills the room with constantly evolving cells, making the space an extension of his body. Futaba blasts the cells away, but Shion emerges from the chaos and hugs her from behind. Futaba realizes this replicates how Rei restrained her childhood tantrums, a feat no one else could manage. Shion explains her computers analyzed security footage of Rei's hugs to copy the technique. Overwhelmed by happy memories of Rei, Futaba cries. Suddenly, Momo causes a giant cherry blossom tree to sprout across the ship's top deck.
46	19	"Dreams"; Transliteration: "Yume" (Japanese: 夢)	Masahiro Hosoda	Nanami Hoshino	Hitoyuki Matsui	November 22, 2026
Taiyo briefly awakens in an alternate reality with his deceased family before snapping back to the ship, restrained by the giant tree. Cutting himself free, he discovers everyone else is trapped in shared illusions and confronts Momo, who has captured the siblings for Rei's resurrection party. Momo reveals his Blooming ability, Dream, traps victims in eternal happy illusions, and Taiyo only escaped because he possesses Tsubomi's blood. Grabbing Taiyo, Momo forces him to relive his family’s deaths, revealing Taiyo also died but was revived by Momo's Someinine to be a normal husband for Mutsumi. Shocked, Taiyo drops his guard and is pulled into the dream world alongside the siblings, Rei, and his own family. Taiyo almost succumbs to the happy illusion, but having already grieved his family's loss, he rejects them. Kyoichiro arrives to battle Momo. Using his own mastery of Steel Spider, Momo unravels Kyoichiro's Arachne barrier and pulls him into the dream. Inside, Momo projects happy childhood memories, only for Kyoichiro to sever Momo's Achilles tendons. Kyoichiro explains that Dreams brainwashes victims into loving Momo, making it useless against someone who still genuinely loves him despite his atrocities. Simultaneously, in the real world, Kyoichiro unleashes his ultimate ability, Void—an infinitely dense, pitch-black web of threads that erases matter—intending to annihilate Momo down to his last atom and shatter his illusions.
47	20	"Momo and Rei"; Transliteration: "Momo to Rei" (Japanese: 百と零)	Michiru Itabisashi	Mirai Minato	Masahiro Hosoda	November 29, 2026

== Reception ==
By December 2022, the manga had over 1.5 million copies in circulation. By January 2025, it had over 3 million copies in circulation. In 2020, the manga was nominated for the sixth Next Manga Awards.
