= The Revolution (Exile Tribe song) =

Single by Exile Tribe
- B-side: "I Wish For You"
- Released: August 20, 2014 (Japan)
- Genre: J-POP
- Label: rhythm zone
- Producer(s): Exile Hiro

Exile Tribe singles chronology
"Burning Up" (2013)	"The Revolution" (2014)

"The Revolution" (styled THE REVOLUTION) is a single by Japanese group Exile Tribe. It was released on August 20, 2014. It debuted in number one on the weekly Oricon Singles Chart, selling 321,879 copies. It was the 9th best-selling single of the year in Japan, with 573,268 copies.

== Track listing ==
=== CD ===
1. THE REVOLUTION
  Vocal：EXILE TAKAHIRO, EXILE NESMITH, EXILE SHOKICHI, Ryuji Imaichi, Hiroomi Tosaka, Ryōta Katayose, Ryūto Kazuhara
2. I Wish For You (EXILE TRIBE New Arrange Cover Version)
  Vocal：EXILE TAKAHIRO, EXILE NESMITH, EXILE SHOKICHI, Ryuji Imaichi, Hiroomi Tosaka
3. THE REVOLUTION (Instrumental)
4. I Wish For You (Instrumental)
