= The Jet Boy Bangerz from Exile Tribe =

Japanese idol boy band

- Origin: Japan
- Genre: J-pop
- Years active: 2022–present
- Label: LDH
- Spinoff of: Exile Tribe
- Members: Yuhi Uhara; エイロン; 石川晃多; 田中彰; 桑原巧光; 佐藤陽; 古嶋滝; NOSUKE; 佐藤蒼虎; 中村碧
- Website: thejetboybangerz.jp

The Jet Boy Bangerz from Exile Tribe (Japanese: ザ・ジェット ボーイ バンガーズ フロム エグザイル トライブ) is a ten-member boy band formed in 2022. The group is part of the collective Exile Tribe, managed by LDH. They released their debut single "Jettin'" in August 2023.

== Name and origins ==
The group name was chosen to convey the idea of “loud individual personalities coming together and burning fiercely like a jet engine.” The group’s abbreviation is “TJBB.” The fanbase is called “Team Jetz.” The name reflects the concept of fans uniting with the members as wings and a driving force that enable them to soar higher together.

== History ==
=== 2022–2023: Auditions and debut ===
During this period, the group was formed through an LDH audition project, released audition-related songs, and made its official debut.

The group was formed through the second chapter of LDH’s large-scale audition project Icon Z: Dreams For Children. The lineup consists of ten members: Aeron, Kota Ishikawa, Aoi Nakamura, and Shigetora Sato, who were finalists from the first chapter; Yuhi Uhara, who also belonged to the LDH-affiliated group Deep Squad and joined from the second chapter; and Show Tanaka, Takumi Kuwahara, Nosuke, Taki Kojima, and Hinata Sato, who participated from Japan’s professional dance league D.League.

From August 2023, Aoi Nakamura and Shigetora Sato also became affiliated with D.League. On December 18, the audition theme song “Ranging Bull” was released digitally. On August 23, the group made its official debut with the single Jettin’.

=== 2024–2025: Release activities and expansion of activities ===
During this period, The Jet Boy Bangerz expanded the scope of their activities through consecutive releases of EPs and albums, tie-ins with visual works, and live performances in Japan and abroad.

On January 31, 2024 the group released its first EP Photogenic. On July 24, the second EP What Time Is It? was released. On November 20, the third EP Unbreakable was released. Its title track “Unbreakable” was selected as the ending theme for the television anime The Blue Wolves of Mibu (Japanese: 青のミブロ, Hepburn: Ao no Miburo) .

On February 19, 2025 the group released its first full-length album Jet Boy. On May 28, the fourth EP Masaka Naku to wa Omoanakatta was released. The title track was used as the theme song for the TV Tokyo drama “Shissōnin Sōsakuhan: The Vanished Truth”. On July 5, the group performed at MixedPop Music Festival 2025 in Bangkok, Thailand, together with fellow LDH group Wolf Howl Harmony. This event marked the group’s first performance in Thailand.

From July to December, the group held a fan meeting tour in Japan titled Live & Fan Meeting Tour 2025: Jet Party. On July 29, the group announced that it had participated in the auditions for America’s Got Talent 2025. On November 19, the fifth EP Let’s Dance was released. The title track “Let’s Dance” was announced as the theme song for the television drama Dark13: Odoru Zonbi Gakkō, starring all members of the group, which is scheduled to begin airing in January 2026 on TV Asahi and ABC TV.

== Artistry ==
=== Performance and choreography ===
The Jet Boy Bangerz consist of seven performers, all of whom are affiliated with the professional dance league D.League. The choreography for each song is created by the members themselves on a track-by-track basis.

Exile Naoto, a senior artist from the same agency, has described the group as “a team like an all-star lineup with outstanding dance skills.” On Nippon Television’s dance battle program The Dance Day, the group won the championship at the 2025 competition.

== Members ==
- Yuhi Uhara (宇原雄⾶)
- Aeron (エイロン)
- Kota Ishikawa (石川晃多)
- Show Tanaka (田中彰)
- Takumi Kuwahara (桑原巧光)
- Hinata Sato (佐藤陽)
- Taki Kojima (古嶋滝)
- Nosuke
- Shigetora Sato (佐藤蒼虎)
- Aoi Nakamura (中村碧)

== Awards ==
- 2025 – Winner of the 4th THE DANCE DAY competition, a nationally televised dance contest aired on Nippon TV.

== Discography ==
=== Studio albums ===
List of albums, with selected chart positions, showing year released and album name
Title	Album details	Peak chart positions		Sales
Title	Album details	JPN	JPN Hot	Sales
Jet Boy	Released: January 31, 2025; Label: Sony Music; Formats: CD, digital download	3	17	JPN: 43,763 (phy.)
Jet Bangin'	Released: July 1, 2026; Label: Sony Music; Formats: CD, digital download	5	11	JPN: 34,212 (phy.)

=== Extended plays ===
List of EPs, with selected chart positions and certifications, showing year released and EP name
Title	EP details	Peak chart positions		Sales
Title	EP details	JPN	JPN Hot	Sales
Photogenic	Released: January 31, 2024; Label: Sony Music; Formats: CD, CD+DVD, digital download	1	1	JPN: 49,734 (phy.)
Masaka Nakuto wa Omowanakatta (まさか泣くとは思わなかった)	Released: May 28, 2025; Label: Sony Music; Formats: CD, digital download	2	5	JPN: 54,928
Let's Dance	Released: November 19, 2025; Label: Sony Music; Formats: CD, digital download	4	6	JPN: 38,714

=== Singles ===
List of singles as lead artist, with selected chart positions, showing year released and album name
Title (Note: A maxi single release that has a different title from any songs in it will be considered as an "EP single" with its title being italicized. Its respective lead track is categorized under promotional single.)	Year	Peak chart positions	Sales	Certifications	Album
Title	Year	JPN	Sales	Certifications	Album
Jettin'	2023	3	JPN: 86,027	RIAJ: Gold (phy.)	Photogenic
"What Time Is It?"	2024	3 (Note: "What Time Is It?" charted on the Oricon Albums Chart rather than the Oricon Singles Chart.)			What Time Is It?
"Unbreakable"	2024	2 (Note: "Unbreakable" charted on the Oricon Albums Chart rather than the Oricon Singles Chart.)	JPN: 42,517		Non-album single
"B.A.D (Breaking All Destinations)"	2025	—			Love/Hate
"Attention"	2025	—			Non-album singles
"Head Up" (Introduced by Zeebra)	2026	4	JPN: 54,106		Non-album singles
"Black Sheep"	2026	—			Jet Bangin'

=== Promotional singles ===
List of promotional singles, with selected chart positions, year released and album name
Title	Year	Peak chart positions	Album
Title	Year	JPN Hot	Album
"Raging Bull"	2022	—	Jettin' (Single)
"Jettin'"	2023	4	Jettin' (Single) and Photogenic
"Photogenic"	2024	—	Photogenic
"Let's Dance"	2025	—	Let's Dance (Single)
"Head Up"	2026	9	Head Up (Single)
