= Aobozu (band) =

Japanese alternative rock band

- Also known as: The Blue Boss (1999–2000)
- Origin: Odawara, Kanagawa, Japan
- Genres: Alternative rock
- Years active: 1999–present
- Labels: Toy's Factory
- Members: Hozzy (vocals); Yūichi Tanaka (田中ユウイチ) (guitar); Shinichi Fujimori (藤森真一) (bass); Takurō Watanabe (渡辺拓郎) (drums)
- Past members: Kamei (亀井) (drummer)
- Website: Aobozu Official Site

Aobozu (藍坊主, Aobōzu) is a Japanese alternative rock band, signed to Toy's Factory. They debuted in 2003, with the album Aobozu.

== Biography ==
Hozzy, Kamei and Fujimori were originally childhood friends, all coming from Odawara. In 1999, they formed a band in called The Blue Boss (ザ･ブルーボーズ, Za Burū Bōzu) in 1999, that was a cover band for Japanese punk band The Blue Hearts. In 2000, they changed the band's name to aobōzu (藍坊主) - the name of a mythical yōkai (Japanese folk legend ghost), however with a different kanji for ao (藍 instead of 青). In 2001, Yūichi Tanaka (a friend of Fujimori's since kindergarten) joined the band as its guitarist. The band then centred their live activities in their hometown, as well as around the Tokyo areas of Hachiōji and Shimokitazawa.

In 2002, the band produced their first self-published CD: "Michi" (道, Street). The following year, the band independently released their debut album Aobozu through Buddy Records, and had their songs featured on many punk compilation albums.

In 2004, the band's drummer Kamei left, and was replaced by a classmate of Tanakas, Takurō Watanabe, as a session drummer. The band then made their major debut under Toy's Factory, Hiroshige Blue, which reached the top 30 on the Oricon albums charts.

Since then, the band has toured exclusively, gradually gaining more fame. Their 2010 album Mizukane reached the top 10 on Oricon.

== Discography ==
=== Albums ===
Year	Album Information	Oricon albums chart positions
2003	Aobozu (藍坊主, Aobōzu): Released: February 12, 2003; Label: Buddy (DLCR-03021)	125
2004	Hiroshige Blue (ヒロシゲブルー, Hiroshige Burū): Major label debut album; Released: May 12, 2004; Label: Toy's Factory (TFCC-86155)	30
2005	Soda (ソーダ, Sōda): Released: May 18, 2005; Label: Toy's Factory (TFCC-86180)	29
2006	Hanamidori (ハナミドリ): Released: April 26, 2006; Label: Toy's Factory (TFCC-86194)	26
2008	Forestone (フォレストーン, Foresutōn): Released: April 2, 2008; Label: Toy's Factory (TFCC-86251)	15
2010	Mizukane (ミズカネ): Released: February 17, 2010; Label: Toy's Factory (TFCC-86321)	10
2011	The Very Best of Aobozu (ザ・ベリー・ベスト・オブ・アオボウズ): Released: April 27, 2011; Label: Toy's Factory (TFCC-86255)	—
2012	Noctiluca (ノクティルカ, Nokutiruka): Released: April 18, 2012; Label: Toy's Factory (TFCC-86381)	—
2013	Bloomery (ブルーメリー, Burūmerī): Released: May 15, 2013; Label: Toy's Factory (TFCC-86438)	—
2013	S/Normally (スノーマリー, Sunōmarī): Released: November 6, 2013; Label: Toy's Factory (TFCC-86447)	—
2014	Himawari (向日葵): Released: August 29, 2014; Label: Toy's Factory	—
2019	Moenai Kaseki (燃えない化石): Released: July 10, 2019; Label: Toy's Factory	35

=== Singles ===
Release	Title	Notes	Oricon Singles charts	Album
2003	"Shizuku" (雫, Drop)	Released under Buddy Records.	52	Hiroshige Blue
2003	"Sora" (空, Sky)	Sole release under Hills Records.	66	Hiroshige Blue
2005	"Uzura" (ウズラ, Quail)	First major label single.	35	Soda
2005	"Spoon" (スプーン, Supūn)		40	Hanamidori
2006	"Sakura no Ashiato" (桜の足あと, Cherry Blossom Footprints)		28	Hanamidori
2006	"Hello Goodbye" (ハローグッバイ, Harō Gubbai)		19	Forestone
2007	"Coin Toss" (コイントス, Koin Tosu)		24	Forestone
2007	"Sora o Tsukuritaku Nakatta" (空を作りたくなかった, I Didn't Want to Make the Sky)		30	Forestone
2008	"Kotoba no Mori" (言葉の森, Forest of Words)		29	Forestone
2008	"Mother" (マザー, Mazā)		28	Mizukane
2009	"Namae no Nai Iro" (名前の無い色, Nameless Color)		32	Mizukane
2010	"Dengon" (伝言, Rumor)		21	Mizukane
