= Wolf Howl Harmony from Exile Tribe =

Japanese idol boy band

- Origin: Japan
- Genres: J-pop, pop rock, R&B, hip-hop, dance
- Years active: 2022–present
- Label: LDH
- Spinoff of: Exile Tribe
- Members: Ryoji; Suzuki; Ghee; Hiroto
- Website: wolfhowlharmony.jp

Wolf Howl Harmony from Exile Tribe (Japanese: ウルフ ハウル ハーモニー フロム エグザイル トライブ, stylized as WOLF HOWL HARMONY from EXILE TRIBE) is a four-member boy band formed in 2022. The group is part of the collective Exile Tribe, managed by LDH.

The group was formed through the LDH-hosted audition program iCON Z ~Dreams For Children~.

They released their debut maxi single "Sweet Rain" in August 2023.

== Name and origins ==
The group was named Wolf Howl Harmony by HIRO, the president of their agency LDH, to reflect how the "life stories of the members intersected, bringing together individuals with a lone-wolf–like sense of melancholy in a fateful way."

The name also conveys the idea that the four members, each with a different background, can "create a beautiful harmony and narrative together because they come from distinct stories".

The fanbase is called Lovered. The name originates from their audition theme song "Love Red," through which the group received significant support and "love" from fans. It expresses the hope that the group and fans will continue to share love with one another.

== Members ==
- Ryoji
- Suzuki
- Ghee
- Hiroto

== History ==
=== 2022–2023: Auditions and debut ===
During this period, the group was formed through an LDH audition project, released audition-related songs, and made its official debut.

==== 2022 ====
The group was formed during the second chapter of LDH's large-scale audition project iCON Z: Dreams For Children, which began in 2021. The lineup consists of Ghee and Hiroto, finalists from the first chapter, along with Ryoji and Suzuki from Deep Squad, who joined the audition in the second chapter. Riku Sasaki, an initial member, withdrew during the audition process.

On December 28, the audition theme song "Love Red" was released digitally. The song reached number one on Spotify's Viral 50(Japan chart) dated February 1, 2023.

==== 2023 ====
On March 12, their debut was announced during the audition program.

On August 23, the group released its debut single "Sweet Rain." Following "Love Red," the song reached number one on Spotify's Viral 50(Japan chart).

In November, the group received the Rising Star Award Presented by Yokohama at the MTV Video Music Awards Japan 2023.

On November 15, the digital single "Sugar Honey" was released. The song was used as the opening theme for the TV Tokyo drama Kiss × Kiss × Kiss.

=== 2024–present: Increase in overseas activities ===
From 2024 onward, the group released multiple songs and appeared at overseas music festivals.

==== 2024 ====
On February 14, the second single "Frozen Butterfly" was released.

On May 13, the digital single "Pink Flash Lights" was released as the first installment of a youth-themed trilogy.

On June 17, the digital single "Love Triangle" was released as the second installment of the trilogy.

On July 7, the group appeared at MIXEDPOP Bangkok 2024 in Thailand.

On July 15, the digital single "Pierce" was released as the final installment of the trilogy.

On October 11, the digital single "Rollin' Stones" was released.The song was used as the opening theme for the television drama Bunt Man (Tokai TV / Fuji TV).

==== 2025 ====
On January 31, the group appeared at the Japanese music culture festival MUUJI Festival 2025 in Thailand.

On February 7, the digital single "Letters" was released as a pre-release track from the group's first album "Wolf".

On March 12, the group released its first studio album "Wolf".On the same day, the music video for the lead track "Bakuon" was released.

On April 18, the group appeared at FWD Music Live Fest 4 in Bangkok, Thailand.

On June 25, the digital single "Bossa Bosa" was released.

Beginning in July, the group held a nationwide fan meeting tour for fan club members titled Wolf Howl Harmony Live & Fan Meeting Tour 2025 – Bakuon Dream –.

On July 5–6, the group appeared at Mixedpop Music Festival Bangkok 2025 in Thailand.

On July 19, the group received the Best Boy Group award at the Asia Top Awards 2025 Presented by APEX Hospital & Clinics in Thailand.

On September 27, the group made its first appearance at Music Matters Live 2025, an international music showcase festival.

On November 21, the digital single "Marmalade" was released.

On December 6–7, the group was announced to make its first appearance at the Southeast Asian outdoor music festival Pepsi Presents Big Mountain Music Festival 15.

== Awards ==
- The group received the special Rising Star Award Presented by Yokohama at the MTV Video Music Awards Japan 2023.
- They won the Best Boy Group award at the Asia Top Awards 2025 Presented by APEX Hospital & Clinics.

== Artistry ==
Wolf Howl Harmony is a four-member vocal and rap group, characterized by choral arrangements and harmonies that highlight each member's distinct vocal tone and singing style.

Since the period of the audition program iCON Z ~Dreams For Children~, DJ Daruma of PKCZ has participated as their creative coordinator, contributing to the group's overall creative direction, including sound, visual design, and stage production.

In their post-debut music production, most of their songs have involved Japanese hip-hop producers Chaki Zulu and T.Kura.

== Reception ==
Singaporean music media outlet Bandwagon Asia commented that "The four-member vocal and rap unit from EXILE TRIBE — Ryoji, Hiroto, Ghee, and Suzuki — have quickly become one of J-pop's most exciting rising acts."

== Discography ==
=== Studio albums ===
List of studio albums, with selected chart positions and certifications, showing year released and album name
Title	Album details	Peak chart positions	
Title	Album details	JPN	JPN Hot
Wolf	Released: March 12, 2025; Label: Rhythm Zone; Formats: CD, digital download	4	26

=== Extended plays ===
List of EPs, with selected chart positions, showing year released and album name
Title	EP details	Peak chart positions	
Title	EP details	JPN	JPN Hot
Tera	Released: March 12, 2026; Label: Rhythm Zone; Formats: CD, CD+DVD, CD+Blu-ray, digital download	4	31

=== Singles ===
List of singles, with selected chart positions, showing year released and album name
Title	Year	Peak chart positions		Album
Title	Year	JPN	JPN Hot	Album
"Love Red"	2022	—	—	Wolf
"Sweet Rain"	2023	5	3	Wolf
"Sugar Honey"	2023	—	—	Wolf
"Frozen Butterfly"	2024	2	9	Wolf
"Pink Flash Lights"	2024	—	—	Wolf
"Love Triangle"	2024	—	—	Wolf
"Pierce"	2024	—	—	Wolf
"Rollin' Stones"	2024	—	—	Wolf
"Letters"	2025	—	—	Wolf
"Bakuon"	2025	—	—	Wolf
"Bossa Bosa"	2025	—	—	Non-album singles
"Marmalade"	2025	—	—	Non-album singles
"Gachi Funk"	2026	—	—	Non-album singles
"Please"	2026	5	—	Non-album singles
"Kokoniiru"	2026	5	36	Non-album singles
"—" denotes releases that did not chart or were not released in that region.
