= Aobōzu =

Monster in Japanese mythology

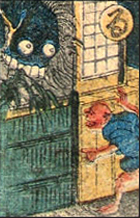
An aobōzu depicted in a deck of obake karuta cards.

Aobōzu (青(あお)坊(ぼ)主(うず), "Blue priest") is a Japanese yōkai (spirit) found in a number of Japanese legends. Stories about aobōzu, in particular the exact details of the spirit, vary widely.

As well as appearing in Japanese folklore, the aobōzu has also been depicted numerous times in traditional Japanese art; examples include one depiction of aobōzu found in Toriyama Sekien's e-hon tetralogy Gazu Hyakki Yagyō.

== In folk legends ==
Though the exact details of the aobōzu vary throughout legends, with differences often split along regional lines, the aobōzu is typically depicted as a large humanoid figure resembling a bōzu (priest). The exact nature of the aobōzu's actions, or the nature of its haunting, also vary; though the aobōzu is simply said to appear in Minabe, Hidaka District, Wakayama Prefecture, in contrast, appearances of the aobōzu in Kaneyama, Ōnuma District, Fukushima Prefecture are said to be a weasel disguised as an aobōzu. In Gifu Prefecture and Hiroshima Prefecture, appearances of the aobōzu are said to be a tanuki disguised as an aobōzu. Appearances and stories of the aobōzu also appear in other areas, such as Haibara District, Shizuoka Prefecture.

=== Nagano Prefecture ===
In Nagano Prefecture, a few variants of the aobōzu legend exist. In one, if a person stops breathing and spins around 7 times at the base of a certain pine tree, an aobōzu is said to appear and say "don't trample the rocks, don't snap the pine tree".

=== Shizuoka Prefecture ===
In Shizuoka Prefecture, it is said that in spring, children who come home late around the time of sunset and run across a wheat field may be kidnapped by an aobōzu appearing from the wheat. The legend is used in part as a reason for not letting children out into the fields at evening in springtime.

=== Okayama Prefecture ===
In Okayama Prefecture, an aobōzu with a blue body or blue clothes is said to appear in vacant houses and other places.

=== Yamaguchi Prefecture ===
In Yamaguchi Prefecture, aobōzu are said to be mountain gods (Yama-no-Kami) who have taken on the appearance of a small priest. In this legend, aobōzu are said to appear before people and suggest they take part in a sumo match with them; despite their small size, the aobōzu, having the powers of a mountain god, is said to toss people easily if they overconfidently take them on.

=== Kagawa Prefecture ===
In Kagawa Prefecture, aobōzu are said to appear before women and ask, "how about hanging your neck?". In this legend, the aobōzu disappears if rejected, but if the woman ignores them without saying anything, the aobōzu forcefully attack the woman, rendering her unconscious before hanging her by the neck.

=== Yamagata Prefecture ===
In Yamagata Prefecture, it is said that the bathroom in one elementary school along the base of a mountain is haunted by an aobōzu. In this legend, the face of a priest with a blue head appears from the toilet and stares at whoever is using it.

=== Fukushima Prefecture ===
Similar to Yamagata Prefecture, in Fukushima Prefecture, in the first half of the 1930s, it is said that an aobōzu would appear in an elementary school bathroom, and it is said that the students at the time were so fearful of it, they would not use the toilet.

== In urban legends ==
Beginning in the Shōwa period, urban legends and school horror tales featuring the aobōzu became popular.

== In the Gazu Hyakki Yagyō ==
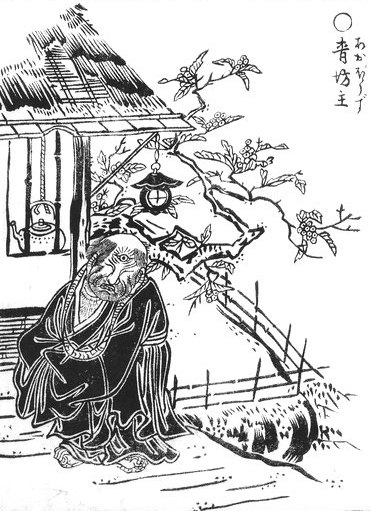
"Aobōzu" from the Gazu Hyakki Yagyō by Sekien Toriyama

In Sekien Toriyama's tetralogy Gazu Hyakki Yagyō, a potential depiction of an aobōzu shows it as a one-eyed priest standing next to a thatched hut. Despite the similarities to the aobōzu legend in appearance, the Gazu Hyakki Yagyō, as an e-hon picture book, did not come with accompanying explanatory text, meaning that the image may not show an aobōzu, and instead may be intended to depict another yōkai, such as the mehitotsu-bō (one-eyed monk) commonly depicted in Edo period artworks, such as the Hyakkai Zukan by Sawaki Sūshi. Toriyama, playing into the fact that the word for blue in Japanese ("ao") can refer to immaturity, may also have intended to depict an insufficiently trained priest as a yōkai.

== See also ==
- Gazu Hyakki Yakō
- List of legendary creatures from Japan
