= Lil League from Exile Tribe =

Japanese idol boy band

- Origin: Japan
- Genres: J-pop
- Years active: 2022–present
- Labels: LDH; Rhythm Zone
- Spinoff of: Exile Tribe
- Members: Sena Iwaki; Tatsuhiro Nakamura; Kodai Yamada; Matora Okao; Haima Momoda; Sora Nanba
- Website: lilleague.jp

Lil League from Exile Tribe (Japanese: リル・リーグ・フロム・エグザイル・トライブ, stylized as LIL LEAGUE from EXILE TRIBE) is a six-member boy band formed in 2022. The group is part of the collective Exile Tribe, managed by LDH and signed to the record label Rhythm Zone from the Avex Group. They released their debut single "Hunter" in January 2023.

== Members ==
- Sena Iwaki (岩城星那)
- Tatsuhiro Nakamura (中村竜大)
- Kodai Yamada (山田晃大)
- Matora Okao (岡尾真虎)
- Haima Momoda (百田隼麻)
- Sora Nanba (難波碧空)

== Discography ==
=== Studio albums ===
List of albums, with selected chart positions and certifications, showing year released and album name
Title	Album details	Peak chart positions		Sales
Title	Album details	JPN	JPN Hot	Sales
Trickster	Released: February 28, 2024; Label: Rhythm Zone; Formats: CD, CD+DVD, digital download	1	2	JPN: 34,039 (phy.)
Neomatic	Released: March 4, 2026; Label: Rhythm Zone; Formats: CD, CD+Blu-ray Disc, digital download	2	51	JPN: 15,990 (phy.)

=== Singles ===
List of singles as lead artist, with selected chart positions, showing year released and album name
Title (Note: A maxi single release that has a different title from any songs in it will be considered as an "EP single" with its title being italicized. Its respective lead track is categorized under promotional single.)	Year	Peak chart positions	Sales	Certifications	Album
Title	Year	JPN	Sales	Certifications	Album
"Hunter"	2023	1	JPN: 100,630	RIAJ: Gold (phy.)	Trickster
"Higher / Monster"	2023	4	JPN: 59,285		Trickster
"Youth Spark"	2024	3	JPN: 45,235		Neomatic
"Manatsu no Hanabi" (真夏ノ花火)	2025	3	JPN: 27,167		Neomatic
"Lilmatic"	2026	—			Neomatic
"Boku wa Sagishiteta / Loca"	2026	7	JPN: 21,882		TBA

=== Promotional singles ===
List of promotional singles, with selected chart positions, year released and album name
Title	Year	Peak chart positions	Album
Title	Year	JPN Hot	Album
"Rollah Coaster"	2022	—	Hunter (Single) and Trickster
"Hunter"	2023	2	Hunter (Single) and Trickster
"Higher"	2023	7	Higher / Monster and Trickster
"Monster"	2023	—	Higher / Monster and Trickster
"Hype Up"	2023	—	Trickster
"15分" (15 Fun)	2023	—	Trickster
"飛龍 -FeiLong-"	2023	—	Trickster
"Lollipop"	2024	—	Trickster
"Heavy Gamer"	2024	—	Non-album single
"Youth Spark"	2024	5	Youth Spark (single)
"Shigeki-Saiyūsen"	2025	9	Shigeki-Saiyūsen (single)
"Manatsu no Hanabi" (真夏ノ花火)	2025	15	Non-album single
"Boku wa Sagishiteta"	2026	15	Boku wa Sagishiteta / Loca (single)
