= Inuwasi =

Japanese idol group

- Origin: Tokyo, Japan
- Genre: J-pop
- Years active: 2020–present
- Label: Maple Records
- Members: Raika; Garumu; Mayu Hanon; Kariwori; Suzume; Rikka
- Past members: Eve
- Website: inuwasi.jp

Inuwasi (stylized in all caps) is a Japanese alternative idol girl group formed in 2020. They made their debut with Aquler in November 2020.

== History ==
Inuwasi made their live debut on February 9, 2020. They released their debut EP, Aquler, on November 30. Their second EP, Thanatos, was released on March 16, 2021. They held their first solo concert on April 4. They released their debut album, Duty, on November 2. Their third EP, Tenbin, was released on March 29, 2022, followed by their fourth, Six, on September 27, 2022. They released their second album, Tranxend, on March 28, 2023. Their fifth EP, Revive Your Faith, was released on September 26. They released their debut single, "Shadows Core:World of Unreal", on June 25, 2024. The single was later featured on their third album, Raptor: Ikazuchi, which was released on November 5. Eve graduated from the group on March 15, 2025. On March 17, Rikka joined the group. On August 27, Inuwasi made their major label debut with the EP, Raimei.

== Members ==
Current

- Raika (ライカ)
- Garumu (がるむ)
- Mayu Hanon (はのんまゆ)
- Kariwori (カリヲリ)
- Suzume (すずめ)
- Rikka (六椛)

Former

- Eve (イヴ)

== Discography ==
=== Studio albums ===
Title	Album details	Peak chart positions	
Title	Album details	Oricon	Billboard
Duty	Released: November 2, 2021; Label: Rock Field; Formats: CD, digital download	26	34
Tranxend	Released: March 28, 2023; Label: Lonesome Record; Formats: CD, digital download	19	26
Raptor: Ikazuchi	Released: November 5, 2024; Label: Rock Field; Formats: CD, digital download	13	13

=== Extended plays ===
Title	EP details	Peak chart positions	
Title	EP details	Oricon	Billboard
Aquler	Released: November 30, 2020; Label: Maple Records; Formats: CD, digital download	—	—
Thanatos	Released: March 16, 2021; Label: Rock Field; Formats: CD, digital download	26	54
Tenbin (天秤)	Released: March 29, 2022; Label: Rock Field; Formats: CD, digital download	33	39
Six	Released: September 27, 2022; Label: Rock Field; Formats: CD, digital download	37	—
Revive Your Faith	Released: September 26, 2023; Label: Rock Field; Formats: CD, digital download	20	22
Raimei	Released: August 27, 2025; Label: Uniera; Formats: CD, digital download	13	—
Kurogane	Released: April 29, 2026; Label: Uniera; Formats: CD, digital download	12	—
Siraha	Released: September 16, 2026; Label: Uniera; Formats: CD, digital download	20	—
"—" denotes releases that did not chart or were not released in that region.

=== Singles ===
Title	Year	Peak chart positions	Album
Title	Year	Oricon	Album
"Shadows Core:World of Unreal"	2024	14	Raptor: Ikazuchi
