= Exile Tribe =

Japanese music group

- Origin: Tokyo, Japan
- Genres: Pop; dance
- Years active: 2012–present
- Labels: LDH; Rhythm Zone
- Members: Exile; Exile the Second; Sandaime J Soul Brothers; Generations; The Rampage; Fantastics; Ballistik Boyz; Psychic Fever; Lil League; Kid Phenomenon; The Jet Boy Bangerz; Wolf Howl Harmony
- Website: exile-tribe.jp/index.php

Exile Tribe (Japanese: エグザイル・トライブ, romanized: Eguzairu Toraibu, stylized in all caps) is the name given to the collective of artists under LDH which are related to the agency's main group, Exile. In 2012, these artists formed a supergroup together, including all members of Exile, Exile the Second, Sandaime J Soul Brothers, Generations, The Rampage, Fantastics, Ballistik Boyz, Psychic Fever, Lil League, Kid Phenomenon, The Jet Boy Bangerz, Wolf Howl Harmony. This concept was first explored in 2004 with the creation of EXILES.

Their single "The Revolution" was the 9th best-selling single of 2014 in Japan and their album Exile Tribe Revolution was the 8th best-selling album of 2014 in Japan.

== History ==
The term Exile Tribe was first used on the tour Nidaime J Soul Brothers VS Sandaime J Soul Brothers Live Tour 2011 ~Exile Tribe~ in June 2011. One year later, in April 2012, the Exile Tribe Live Tour 2012 ~Tower of Wish~ concert tour was held featuring various LDH artists.

In September 2012, a unit featuring EXILE and Sandaime J Soul Brothers released the single "24karats Tribe of Gold" as Exile Tribe.

In January 2013, Sandaime J Soul Brothers and Generations added the brand Exile Tribe in its group name. On September 10, 2013, both groups released the joint single "Burning Up", credited as a release from Exile Tribe.

In January 2014, LDH started the Exile Tribe Perfect Year 2014, with releases from Exile Tribe and its connected groups and a nationwide dome tour.

On April 11, 2014, the group The Rampage was announced as part of Exile Tribe.

On September 20, Exile Tribe released a single titled "The Revolution", including members from groups Exile, Sandaime J Soul Brothers, and Generations in its line-up. A week later, the same line-up released the album Exile Tribe Revolution. Both the single and the album reached the #1 position on Oricon's weekly chart. From September to December, all groups related to Exile Tribe participated in the dome tour Exile Tribe Perfect Year Live Tour Tower of Tower of Wish 2014 ~The Revolution~.

On October 22, 2015, members part of the Exile Tribe starred in the TV drama HiGH&LOW ~The Story of S.W.O.R.D.~. The groups also participated in the soundtrack of the drama, which was released in 2016 as part of Exile Tribe's releases. They continued to participate in the project until 2017.

On January 25, 2017, The Rampage made their major debut with the single "Lightning", officially joining the Exile Tribe.

On September 15, 2018, Fantastics was announced as an Exile Tribe group and officially joined on December 5 after their major debut with the single "Over Drive".

On March 31, 2019, Ballistik Boyz was announced as an Exile Tribe group, officially joining on May 22 with the release of their major debut album.

In June 2019, the Battle of Tokyo project started, which introduced a new unit of Exile Tribe called Jr.Exile. This unit consists of the groups Generations, The Rampage, Fantastics, and Ballistik Boyz.

On July 13, 2022, Psychic Fever officially joined Exile Tribe with their debut album "P.C.F".

On October 31, 2022, Keiji Kuroki graduated from Exile Tribe and Exile the Second and retired from the entertainment industry, later from EXILE TRIBE.

On January 11, 2023, Lil League officially joined Exile Tribe after their major debut with the single "Hunter".

On August 23, 2023, Kid Phenomenon debut with the single "Wheelie", The Jet Boy Bangerz debut with the single "Jettin'" and Wolf Howl Harmony debut with the single "Sweet Rain" and officially joined Exile Tribe after a major debut.

== Band members ==
- Exile
- Exile the Second
- Sandaime J Soul Brothers
- Gekidan Exile
- Generations from Exile Tribe
- The Rampage from Exile Tribe
- Fantastics from Exile Tribe
- Ballistik Boyz from Exile Tribe
- Psychic Fever from Exile Tribe
- Lil League
- Kid Phenomenon
- The Jet Boy Bangerz
- Wolf Howl Harmony
- Samurize from Exile Tribe

== Discography ==
=== Studio albums ===
List of albums, with selected chart positions
Title	Album details	Peak positions	Certifications
Title	Album details	JPN	Certifications
Exile Tribe Revolution	Released: August 27, 2014 (JPN); Label: Rhythm Zone; Formats: CD, CD/DVD, CD/Blu-ray, digital download	1	RIAJ: Platinum
Battle of Tokyo: Enter the Jr. Exile	Released: July 3, 2019 (JPN); Label: Rhythm Zone; Formats: CD+DVD, CD+Blu-ray, CD album, digital download	3	
Battle of Tokyo: Time 4 Jr. Exile	Released: June 23, 2021 (JPN); Label: Rhythm Zone; Formats: CD+DVD, CD+Blu-ray, CD album, digital download, streaming	3	

=== Remix albums ===
List of albums, with selected chart positions
Title	Album details	Peak positions	Ref.
Title	Album details	JPN	Ref.
DJ Kaori Exile Tribe Remix	Non-stop remix by DJ Kaori; Released: March 20, 2013 (JPN); Label: Rhythm Zone; Formats: CD, digital download	7	
Exile Tribe Perfect Remix	Non-stop remix by DJ Makidai; Released: June 18, 2014 (JPN); Label: Rhythm Zone; Formats: CD, 2CD/DVD, digital download	7	

=== Singles ===
List of singles, with selected chart positions
Title	Year	Peak chart positions			Certifications	Album
Title	Year	Oricon Singles Charts	Billboard Japan Hot 100 (Note: Sources for chart positions are as follows: "24karats Tribe of Gold", "Burning Up", "The Revolution", "Keep On Singing", "24world", "Akanegumo".)	TWN East Asian	Certifications	Album
"24karats Tribe of Gold"	2012	2	2	19	RIAJ (physical): Platinum; RIAJ (digital): Platinum	Exile Tribe Revolution
"Burning Up"	2013	1	3	—	RIAJ (physical): Gold	Exile Tribe Revolution
"The Revolution"	2014	1	3	—	RIAJ (physical): 2× Platinum	Exile Tribe Revolution
"Rising Sun to the World"	2021	—	—	—		
"Akanegumo"	2024	—	70	—		
"—" denotes items that did not chart.

==== Promotional singles ====
List of promotional singles with selected chart positions
Title	Year	Peak chart positions	Album
Title	Year	Billboard Japan Hot 100	Album
"Keep On Singing"	2014	100	Exile Tribe Revolution
"24World"	2014	37	Exile Tribe Revolution

=== Video albums ===
List of media, with selected chart positions
Title	Album details	Peak positions		Certifications
Title	Album details	JPN DVD	JPN Blu-ray	Certifications
Exile Tribe Live Tour 2012 Tower of Wish	Released: October 17, 2012 (JPN); Label: Rhythm Zone; Formats: DVD, Blu-ray	1	1	RIAJ: Platinum
Exile Tribe Nidaime J Soul Brothers vs. Sandaime J Soul Brothers Live Tour 2011: Keishō	Released: November 7, 2012 (JPN); Label: Rhythm Zone; Formats: DVD	6	—	
Exile Live Tour 2013 Exile Pride	Released: October 16, 2013 (JPN); Label: Rhythm Zone; Formats: DVD, Blu-ray	1	1	RIAJ: Gold
Exile Live Tour 2013 "Exile Pride" 9.27 Final	Released: March 31, 2014 (JPN); Label: Rhythm Zone; Formats: DVD, Blu-ray	1	2	RIAJ: Gold
Exile Tribe Perfect Year Live Tour Tower of Wish 2014 ~The Revolution~	Released: April 4, 2015 (JPN); Label: Rhythm Zone; Formats: DVD, Blu-ray	1	1	
