= Ringwanderung =

Japanese idol group

- Origin: Tokyo, Japan
- Genres: J-pop
- Years active: 2019–present
- Labels: Sun Colorz; Lonesome Record
- Members: Karin Henmi; Rinko Sato; Akina Masuda; Nene Terao; Momone Shinoda
- Past members: Yuri Miyauchi; Myon
- Website: ringwanderung-official.com

Ringwanderung is a Japanese girl group formed in 2019. They released their debut album, Synchronism, in August 2021.

== History ==
On November 23, 2019, Ringwanderung was formed by Sun Colorz with a six-member line-up consisting of Myon, Karin Henmi, Rinko Sato, Akina Masuda, Nene Terao and Yuri Miyauchi. On May 9, 2020, Yuri Miyauchi graduated from the group. They released their first digital single, "Hello Hello", on August 16. On November 17, the group terminated its contract with Sun Colorz. On August 4, 2021, they released their debut album Synchronism. Their second album, Synchrotron, was released on October 19, 2022. Myon withdrew from the group on February 15, 2024. On September 4, they released their third album Aratayo. Momone Shinoda joined the group on September 13.

== Members ==
Current

- Karin Henmi (辺見花琳)
- Rinko Sato (佐藤倫子)
- Akina Masuda (増田陽凪)
- Nene Terao (寺尾音々)
- Momone Shinoda (篠田百音)

Former

- Yuri Miyauchi (宮内ゆり)
- Myon (みょん)

== Discography ==
=== Studio albums ===
Title	Album details	Peak chart positions	
Title	Album details	Oricon	Billboard
Synchronism	Released: August 4, 2021; Label: Lonesome Record; Formats: CD, digital download	—	85
Synchrotron	Released: October 19, 2022; Label: Lonesome Record; Formats: CD, digital download	29	42
Aratayo (新夜)	Released: September 4, 2024; Label: Lonesome Record; Formats: CD, digital download	—	—
Synchronicity	Released: June 10, 2026; Label: Verse; Formats: CD, digital download	50	—
