= Kid Phenomenon from Exile Tribe =

Japanese idol boy band

- Origin: Japan
- Genre: J-pop
- Years active: 2022–present
- Label: LDH
- Spinoff of: Exile Tribe
- Members: Kensuke Sorematsu; Tsubasa Endo; Kohaku Okao; Soma Kawaguchi; Shunnosuke Sato; Kota Yamamoto; Rui Suzuki
- Website: www.kidphenomenon.jp

Kid Phenomenon from Exile Tribe (Japanese: キッド フェノメノン フロム エグザイル トライブ, stylized as KID PHENOMENON from EXILE TRIBE) is a seven-member boy band formed in 2022. The group is part of the collective Exile Tribe, managed by LDH. They released their debut single "Wheelie" in August 2023.

== Members ==
- Kensuke Sorematsu (夫松健介)
- Tsubasa Endo (遠藤翼空)
- Kohaku Okao (岡尾琥珀)
- Soma Kawaguchi (川口蒼真)
- Shunnosuke Sato (佐藤峻乃介)
- Kota Yamamoto (山本光汰)
- Rui Suzuki (鈴木瑠偉)

== Discography ==
=== Studio albums ===
List of studio albums, with selected chart positions and certifications, showing year released and album name
Title	Album details	Peak chart positions	
Title	Album details	JPN	JPN Hot
Phenomenon	Released: January 22, 2025; Label: Sony Music; Formats: CD, digital download	2	30
Kids00's	Released: June 17, 2026; Label: Sony Music; Formats: CD, digital download	2	26

=== Singles ===
List of singles, with selected chart positions, showing year released and album name
Title	Year	Peak chart positions		Album
Title	Year	JPN	JPN Hot	Album
"Wheelie"	2023	4	5	Phenomenon
"Sonzaishōmei" 存在証明	2023	2	—	Phenomenon
"One Day"	2024	3	13	Phenomenon
"Ace in the Hole"	2024	—	—	Phenomenon
"Show U Light"	2024	—	—	Phenomenon
"Unstoppable"	2024	3	6	Phenomenon
"Party Over There"	2025	—	—	Phenomenon
"Sparkle Summer"	2025	3	4	Kids00's
"Snakebite"	2025	—	—	Kids00's
"Black Flame"	2025	3	9	Kids00's
"Mirror"	2026	2	10	Kids00's
"Kids"	2026	—	—	Kids00's
"I'm Still Breathing"	2026	7	17	Non-album single
"—" denotes releases that did not chart or were not released in that region.
