= List of Mission: Yozakura Family chapters =

Mission: Yozakura Family is a Japanese manga series written and illustrated by Hitsuji Gondaira. It was serialized in Shueisha's Weekly Shōnen Jump from August 26, 2019, to January 20, 2025. Shueisha collected its chapters in 29 individual tankōbon volumes, from February 4, 2020, to March 4, 2025.

Viz Media publishes the manga digitally in English on its Shonen Jump website. Shueisha also simultaneously publishes the series in English for free on the Manga Plus app and website. Viz Media started releasing the volumes in print on October 18, 2022.

== Volumes ==
No.	Original release date	Original ISBN	English release date	English ISBN
1	February 4, 2020	978-4-08-882178-8	December 22, 2020 (digital); October 18, 2022 (print)	978-1-9747-1718-7 (digital); 978-1-9747-3466-5 (print)
Mission 1: "The Cherry Blossom Ring" (桜の指輪, Sakura no Yubiwa); Mission 2: "The Yozakuras' Lifeline" (夜桜のいの命, Yozakura no Raifurain); Mission 3: "Feelings" (気持ち, Kimochi); Mission 4: "Recovering the Ring" (指輪取戻, Yubiwa o Torimodosu); Mission 5: "Hostage" (人質, Hitojichi); Mission 6: "Flower Bin Delivery Headquarters" (フラワー使本社, Furawā-shi Honsha); Mission 7: "Surprise Attack" (襲撃, Shūgeki)
2	April 3, 2020	978-4-08-882243-3	March 23, 2021 (digital); December 20, 2022 (print)	978-1-9747-2612-7 (digital); 978-1-9747-3467-2 (print)
Mission 8: "Three Minutes" (3分, 3-Bu); Mission 9: "Investigation" (取り調べ, Torishirabe); Mission 10: "Shinzo" (辛三, Shinzō); Mission 11: "Glitch" (バグ, Bagu); Mission 12: "Dozing Off" (居眠り, Inemuri); Mission 13: "Impostor" (偽者, Nisemono); Mission 14: "Date" (デート, Dēto); Mission 15: "Cupid's Needle" (クピッドの針, Kupido no Hari); Mission 16: "Underworld Toy Store" (黄泉玩具屋, Yomi Omochaya); Bonus Story 1: "Goliath on a Moonlit Night"; Bonus Story 2: "Temple Offering"
3	June 4, 2020	978-4-08-882334-8	June 22, 2021 (digital); February 21, 2023 (print)	978-1-9747-2835-0 (digital); 978-1-9747-3643-0 (print)
Mission 17: "Athletic War" (体育戦争, Taiiku Sensō); Mission 18: "Reception" (披露宴, Kekkon Hirōen); Mission 19: "Government Spies" (公務員スパイ, Kōmuin Supai); Mission 20: "Spying on a Spy" (スパイのスパイ, Supai no Supai); Mission 21: "The Hinagiku" (ヒナギク, Hinagiku); Mission 22: "The Kuroyuri Party" (黒百合党, Kuroyuri tō); Mission 23: "Truths" (真実, Shinjitsu); Mission 24: "The Flower Meaning of Kuroyuri (Black Lily)" (黒百合 の花言葉, Kuroyuri no Hanakotoba); Mission 25: "Information" (情報, Jōhō)
4	August 4, 2020	978-4-08-882382-9	September 28, 2021 (digital); April 18, 2023 (print)	978-1-9747-3034-6 (digital); 978-1-9747-3644-7 (print)
Mission 26: "The Hinagiku Hot Pot" (ヒナギク鍋, Hinagiku Nabe); Mission 27: "The Yozakura Family Maid" (夜桜のメイド, Yozakura no Meido); Mission 28: "Cheating" (浮気, Uwaki); Mission 29: "Yozakura Ghost Stories" (夜桜の怪談, Yozakura no Kaidan); Mission 30: "Shopping Trip" (お買い物, O Kaimono); Mission 31: "Prison Break Grandpa" (プリズンジジブレイク, Purizun Jiji Bureiku); Mission 32: "Nanao's Medicine, Part 1" (七悪のくすり(前編), Nanao no Kusuri (Zenpen)); Mission 33: "Nanao's Medicine, Part 2" (七悪のくすり(後編), Nanao no Kusuri (Kohen)); Mission 34: "Spy License" (スパイ免許証, Supai Menkyoshō)
5	November 4, 2020	978-4-08-882475-8	December 28, 2021 (digital); June 20, 2023 (print)	978-1-9747-3095-7 (digital); 978-1-9747-3688-1 (print)
Mission 35: "Library of the Dead" (故人の図書館, Kojin no Toshokan); Mission 36: "Tanpopo" (タンポポ); Mission 37: "Goliath's Walk" (ゴリアテのさんぽ, Goriate no Sanpo); Mission 38: "Winners & Losers" (勝ち組と負け組, Kachi-gumi to Make-gumi); Mission 39: "The Aquarium Trap" (水族館の罠, Suizokukan no Wana); Mission 40: "Capturing Kengo" (嫌五捕獲大作戦, Iyana Hokaku Senryaku); Mission 41: "Sosuke's License Renewal" (草助の免許更新, Sōsuke no Menkyo Kōshin); Mission 42: "Fishing" (魚釣り, Sakanatsuri); Mission 43: "Inmate Taiyo Asano" (囚人朝野太陽, Shūjin Asano Taiyō)
6	January 4, 2021	978-4-08-882532-8	August 1, 2023 (digital); August 15, 2023 (print)	978-1-9747-3176-3 (digital); 978-1-9747-3689-8 (print)
Mission 44: "Aim for the Suite Room" (目指せスイートルーム, Mezase Suītorūmu); Mission 45: "Vs. Nohmen" (VS ノウメン, VS Noumen); Mission 46: "The Unseen Gunshot Wound" (見えない銃創, Mienai Jūsō); Mission 47: "Yozakura Blood" (夜桜の血, Yozakura no Chi); Mission 48: "Clearing the Yard" (庭掃除, Niwa Soji); Mission 49: "Father" (父, Chichi); Mission 50: "Mutsumi's Cooking" (六美クッキング, Mutsumi Kukkingu); Mission 51: "Beast Crossing" (ケダモノの森, Kedamono no Mori); Mission 52: "Yozakura Hot Springs Story, Part 1" (夜桜温泉物語 (前編), Yozakura Onsen Monogatari (Zenpen))
7	March 4, 2021	978-4-08-882579-3	October 17, 2023	978-1-9747-4097-0
Mission 53: "Yozakura Hot Springs Story, Part 2" (夜桜温泉物語 (後編), Yozakura Onsen Monogatari (Kohen)); Mission 54: "Original Spy Fan Submissions Revealed!" (オリジナルスパイ大募集結果発表!!, Orijinaru Supai dai Boshū Kekka Happyō!!); Mission 55: "Steam Locomotive Gerbera" (蒸気機関車「ガーベラ」, Jōki Kikan-sha `Gābera'); Mission 56: "A Drug Called Tanpopo" (タンポポという薬, Tanpopo to iu Kusuri); Mission 57: "Sun Earrings" (太陽のピアス, Taiyō no Piasu); Mission 58: "Just My Normal" (あたりまえ, Atarimae); Mission 59: "Final Destination" (終点, Shūten); Mission 60: "Baby Taiyo" (ベビー太陽, Bebī Taiyō); Mission 61: "Together with Grandpa" (おじいちゃと一緒, Ojīcha to Issho)
8	April 30, 2021	978-4-08-882663-9	December 19, 2023	978-1-9747-4117-5
Mission 62: "Yozakura Front Lines" (夜桜前線, Yozakura Zensen); Mission 63: "The Blooming" (開花, Kaika); Mission 64: "The Yozakura Roots" (夜桜の根, Yozakura no Ne); Mission 65: "A Game of Old Maid Decides the Fate of the Yozakura Couple!!" (夜桜夫婦ババ抜き大決戦, Yozakura Fūfu Baba-nuki Daisakusen); Mission 66: "Cherry Blossom Viewing Party" (お花見, O Hana mi); Mission 67: "5,000 Meters Above Skeleton Island" (白骨島上空5000m, Shirahone Tō Jōkū 5000 m); Mission 68: "Break Through The Shutters" (開閉口突破, Kaihei-guchi Toppa); Mission 69: "Blooming of Cherry Blossom Leaf Hazakura" (葉桜の開花, Hazakura no Kaika); Mission 70: "Easterly Wind" (東風, Kochi)
9	July 2, 2021	978-4-08-882709-4	February 20, 2024	978-1-9747-4312-4
Mission 71: "Shinzo vs. Kurosawa" (辛三 VS クロサワ, Shinzou Vs Kurosawa); Mission 72: "Weapon" (武器, Buki); Mission 73: "Fear" (恐怖, Kyōfu); Mission 74: "Seed Sowing Project" (種まき計画, Tanemaki Keikaku); Mission 75: "Shion & Kengo vs. Cha-Cha & Aonuma" (四怨 & 嫌五 VS チャチャ & アオヌマ, Shion & Kengo VS Cha-Cha & Aonuma); Mission 76: "Melting Snow" (雪解け, Yukidoke); Mission 77: "Society" (社会, Shakai); Mission 78: "Ai and Mizuki" (アイとミズキ, Ai to Mizuki); Mission 79: "Makoto Kawashita" (皮下 真, Kawashita Makoto)
10	October 4, 2021	978-4-08-882792-6	April 16, 2024	978-1-9747-4351-3
Mission 80: "Resonance" (共鳴, Kyōmei); Mission 81: "Old Blood" (旧い血, Furui chi); Mission 82: "Heartbeat" (鼓動, Kodō); Mission 83: "Kawashita vs. the Yozakura Siblings" (皮下 VS夜桜兄妹, Kawashita VS Yozakura Kyōdai); Mission 84: "Mission Complete" (作戦終了, Sakusen Shūryō); Mission 85: "Graveside" (墓前, Bozen); Mission 86: "Ai Comes to the Yozakura Family" (アイさん夜桜家へ, Ai-san Yozakura-ka e); Mission 87: "Operation: Shion's Date Outfit" (四怨デートコーデ大作戦, Shion Dētokōde Daisakusen); Mission 88: "Blooming and Rumors" (開花と噂, Kaika to Uwasa)
11	January 4, 2022	978-4-08-883009-4	June 18, 2024	978-1-9747-4583-8
Mission 89: "Dream" (夢, Yume); Mission 90: "Spy Advancement Exam" (スパイ昇級試験, Supai Shōkyū Shiken); Mission 91: "First Stage Examiner Shinzo Yozakura" (一次試験官夜桜辛三, Ichiji Shiken-kan Yozakura Shinzō); Mission 92: "Fear" (怖さ, Kowasa); Mission 93: "Second Exam Stage Examiner Futaba Yozakura" (二次試験官 夜桜二刃, Niiji Shiken-kan Yozakura Futaba); Mission 94: "The Eldest Sister's Gaze" (長女の眼差し, Chōjo no Manazashi); Mission 95: "Final Examiner - Kyoichiro Yozakura" (最終試験感 夜桜凶一郎, Saishū Shiken-kan Yozakura KyōIchirō); Mission 96: "The Fruit of Love" (愛の結晶, Ai no Kesshō); Mission 97: "Exam Complete" (試験終了, Shiken Shūryō)
12	March 4, 2022	978-4-08-883038-4	August 20, 2024	978-1-9747-4631-6
Mission 98: "The Brother Shinzo Safety Watch Team" (辛三兄ちゃん見守り隊, Shinzō Nīchan Mimamoritai); Mission 99: "Mini Kyoichiro" (ミニ凶一郎, Mini Kyouichirou); Mission 100: "Father and Children" (父と子と, Chichi to Ko to); Mission 100β: "Ai of the Yozakura Family" (夜桜さんちのアイさん, Yozakura-san Chi no ai-san); Mission 101: "Tsubomi and Momo" (つぼみと百, Tsubomi to Momo); Mission 102: "New Cherry Blossoms" (新しい桜, Atarashī Sakura); Mission 103: "The Dr. Mutsumi Clinic" (Dr. 六美診療所, Dokutā Mutsumi Shinryōsho); Mission 104: "Shion's Computer Class" (四怨のパソコン教室, Shion no Pasokon Kyōshitsu); Mission 105: "Mutsumi's Major Diet" (六美ダイエット大作戦, Mutsumi Daietto Daisakusen)
13	June 3, 2022	978-4-08-883143-5	October 15, 2024	978-1-9747-4907-2
Mission 106: "At the Old Yozakura Residence" (旧夜桜邸にて, Kyū Yozakura-tei Nite); Mission 107: "Lady Ninomae, The Second Head" (二代目当主ニノ前御前, Nidaime Tōshu Ninome Gozen); Mission 108: "Mission: Major Cleanup!" (おそうじ大作戦, Osōji Daisakusen); Mission 109: "Kengo's Post-Bath Egg-White Skin" (嫌五の湯上がり卵肌, Kengo no Yuagari Tamago Hada); Mission 110: "The Yozakura Silk Mill" (夜桜製糸場, Yozakura Seishi-ba); Mission 111: "Tsubomi and Mutsumi" (つぼみ と 六美, Tsubomi to Mutsumi); Mission 112: "Ai's Errand" (アイさんのおつかい, Ai-san no Otsukai); Mission 113: "Nanao Hazard" (ななお ハザード, Nanao Hazādo); Mission 114: "Decisive Battle of the Eldest Children" (長子決戦, Chōshi Kessen)
14	September 2, 2022	978-4-08-883227-2	December 17, 2024	978-1-9747-4952-2
Mission 115: "Yozakura Film Festival" (夜桜映画祭, Yozakura Eiga Sai); Mission 116: "Shinzo the Bodybuilder" (ボディビルダー辛三, Bodibirudā Shinzō-san); Mission 117: "Kyoichiro's Disappearance" (凶一郎の消失, Kyōichirō no Shōshitsu); Mission 118: "Path of Retreat" (退路, Tairo); Mission 119: "Mutsumi and Kyoichiro" (六美と凶一郎, Mutsumi to Kyōichirō); Mission 120: "Rejection" (拒絶, Kyozetsu); Mission 121: "Family Meeting" (家族会議, Kazoku Kaigi); Mission 122: "Eldest Son Search Strategy" (長男捜索大作戦, Chōnan Sōsaku dai Sakusen); Mission 123: "Spy Association Chairman Izumo Kai" (スパイ協会会長 出雲灰, Supai Kyōkai Kaichō Izumo hai)
15	November 4, 2022	978-4-08-883288-3	February 18, 2025	978-1-9747-5189-1
Mission 124: "Kyoichiro vs. The Yozakura Siblings" (凶一郎 VS 夜桜兄弟, KyōIchirō VS Yozakura Kyōdai); Mission 125: "I Won't Let You Go" (行かせない, Ikasenai); Mission 126: "My Precious Family" (大事な家族, Daijina Kazoku); Mission 127: "Idiot" (ばか, Baka); Mission 128: "We're Home" (ただいま, Tadaima); Mission 129: "Let's Be a Family Again" (家族になるう, Kazoku ni Narū); Mission 130: "Eldest Brother Family Day of Payback" (長男家族サービースデー, Chōnan Kazoku Sābīsu Dē); Mission 131: "Family Restaurant Meeting with Dad" (ファミリーレス父子会談, Famirīresu Fushi Kaidan); Mission 132: "Chase" (追跡, Tsuiseki)
16	January 4, 2023	978-4-08-883420-7	April 15, 2025	978-1-9747-5231-7
Mission 133: "The Yozakura Siblings vs. ?" (夜桜姉弟 VS ？, Yozakura Kyōdai Bāsasu ?); Mission 134: "Zero Points" (0点, Zero-ten); Mission 135: "The Gold-Rank Spy Meeting Part 1" (金級会議（前編), Kin-kyū Kaigi (Zenpen)); Mission 136: "The Gold-Rank Spy Meeting Part 2" (金級会議（-編), Kin-kyū Kaigi (Nipen)); Mission 137: "Apology Video" (謝罪 動画, Shazai Dōga); Mission 138: "Gold-Rank Spy Alexandryu" (金級アレクサンド龍, Kin-kyū Arekusando Ryū); Mission 139: "Gold-Rank Spy Shura" (金級 修羅, Kin-kyū Shura); Mission 140: "In the Library" (図書館にて, Toshokan Nite); Mission 141: "Objectives" (狙い, Nerai)
17	April 4, 2023	978-4-08-883448-1	June 17, 2025	978-1-9747-5513-4
Mission 142: "Separation" (分断, Bundan); Mission 143: "Making Soba Noodles" (そば打ち, Soba-uchi); Mission 144: "Gold-Rank Spy Giga" (金級「 G ｣, Kin-kyū Gīga); Mission 145: "Gold-Rank Spy Hulang" (金級「虎狼」, Kin-kyū Hǔláng); Mission 146: "Sparring" (組手, Kumite); Mission 147: "Mission: Sibling Retrieval Begins" (姉弟奪還作戦開始, Kyōdai Dakkan Sakusen Kaishi); Mission 148: "Separation" (分断, Bundan); Mission 149. "Yozakura Family Feud" (夜桜兄妹対決, Yozakura Kyōdai Taiketsu); Mission 150. "Touch" (触れる, Fureru)
18	July 4, 2023	978-4-08-883567-9	August 19, 2025	978-1-9747-5556-1
Mission 151. "Shinzo's Memories" (辛三の記憶, Shinzo-san no Kioku); Mission 152. "Smarts" (スマート, Sumāto); Mission 153. "Analysis" (解析, Kaiseki); Mission 154. "In Mother's Arms" (母さんの腕, Kāsan no Ude); Mission 155. "Disaster" (異変, Ihen); Mission 156. "Dreams" (夢, Yume); Mission 157. "I Love You" (愛してる, Aishiteru); Mission 158. "Void" (無, Mu); Mission 159. "Momo & Rei" (百と零, Moto to Rei)
19	September 4, 2023	978-4-08-883667-6	October 21, 2025	978-1-9747-5813-5
Mission 160. "Interruption" (横槍, Yokoyari); Mission 161. "A Drive Across The Sea" (海上ドライブ, Kaijō Doraibu); Mission 162. "Career Counseling" (進路指導, Shinro Shidō); Mission 163. "Wedding Anniversary Wars" (結婚記念日戦争, Kekkon Kinenbi Sensō); Mission 164. "Tsubomi's Visit" (つぼみ来訪, Tsubomi Raihō); Mission 165. "Asa" (旦); Mission 166. "Tsubomi & Asa" (つぼみと旦, Tsubomi to Asa); Mission 167. "Yozakura Family Album" (夜桜アルバム, Yozakura Arubamu); Mission 168. "Momo's Video Letter" (百のビデオレター, Hyaku no Bideo Retā)
20	November 2, 2023	978-4-08-883748-2	December 16, 2025	978-1-9747-5815-9
Mission 169. "The Letters" (手紙の中身, Tegami no Nakami); Mission 170. "Mission: Yozakura Family" (夜桜さんちの大作戦, Yozakura-san Chi no Daisakusen); Mission 171. "The Yozakura Family's 11th Generation" (夜桜さんちの11代目, Yozakura-san Chi no 11-daime); Mission 172. "I'm Sorry" (ごめんね, Gomen ne); Mission 173. "Taiyo Yozakura" (夜桜 太陽, Yozakura Taiyo); Mission 174. "Teiou Academy" (帝桜学園, Teiō Gakuen); Mission 175. "Uncle Kyoichiro" (凶一郎おじさん, KyōIchirō Ojisan); Mission 176. "Uncle Kyoichiro vs. Papa Taiyo" (凶一郎おじさんVS太陽パパ, KyōIchirō Ojisan VS Taiyō Papa); Mission 177. "Yozakura Family Stamp Card" (夜桜さんちのスタンプカード, Yozakura-san Chi no Sutanpukādo)
21	January 4, 2024	978-4-08-883794-9	February 17, 2026	978-1-9747-6205-7
Mission 178. "Auntie Futaba" (二刃おばちゃん, Futaba Oba-chan); Mission 179. "Hifumi vs. Auntie Futaba" (ひふみVS二刃おばちゃん, Hifumi VS Futaba Oba-chan); Mission 180. "Friends?" (友達?, Tomodachi?); Mission 181. "Aunt Shion vs. Uncle Kengo" (四怨おばちゃんVS嫌五おじちゃん, Shion Oba-chan VS Kengo Ojisan); Mission 182. "The Middle Kids vs. The Twins" (年中組VS双子, Nenchū Kumi VS Futago); Mission 183. "Bad-Alpha" (悪ふぁ, Warufa); Mission 184. "Operation Capture Alpha" (あるふぁ捕獲作戦, Arufa Hokaku Sakusen); Mission 185. "Operation Nursing Alpha" (あるふぁ 看病大作戦, Arufa Kanbyō Daisakusen); Mission 186. "Seven Thousand Miles to Visit Nanao" (七悪を訪ねて三千里, Nanao o Tazunete Sanzenri)
22	March 4, 2024	978-4-08-883845-8	April 21, 2026	978-1-9747-6204-0
Mission 187. "Uncle Kyoichiro Wants to Be Loved" (凶一郎おじちゃんは愛されたい, Kyōichirō Oji-chan wa Aisaretai); Mission 188. "An Island at the Edge of the North" (北の果ての小島, Kita no Hate no Kojima); Mission 189. "The Nanao Dungeon" (七悪ダンジョン, Nanao Danjon); Mission 190. "King Nanao, The Mid Boss" (中ボス キングななお, Nakabosu Kinguna Nanao); Mission 191. "Twins' Bickering" (双子げんか, Futago-genka); Mission 192. "The Twins Are Mad!" (ふたご は おこっている!!, Futago wa Okotte Iru!!); Mission 193. "The Twins Grew Up" (大人な双子, Otonana Futago); Mission 194. "Shinzo's Wedding Ceremony" (辛三の結婚式, Shinzō no Kekkonshiki); Mission 195. "Alexandryu vs. The Yozakura Family" (アレクサンド龍VS夜桜兄妹, Arekusandoryū VS Yozakura Kyōdai)
23	April 4, 2024	978-4-08-884002-4	June 16, 2026	978-1-9747-6368-9
Mission 196. "The Ceremony Begins" (結婚式開宴, Kekkonshiki Kaien); Mission 197. "Family Battle Planning Meeting" (親子作戦会議, Oyako Sakusen Kaigi); Mission 198. "The Twins' Presents" (双子プレゼントタイム, Futago Purezento Taimu); Mission 199. "Taiyo Yozakura vs. Alexandryu" (夜桜太陽VSアレクサンド龍, Yozakura Taiyō VS Arekusandoryū); Mission 200. "True Spring Blooming" (開花春来, Kaika Haruki); Mission 201. "Party's Over" (お開き, Ohiraki); Mission 202. "Mozu & Ryu & Asa" (もずと龍と旦, Mozu to Ryū to Asa); Mission 203. "Taiyo's Escape" (逃亡者太陽, Tōbōsha Taiyō); Mission 204. "The Many Faces of Hifumi" (ひふみ七変化, Hifumi Shichihenge)
24	June 4, 2024	978-4-08-884119-9	August 18, 2026	978-1-9747-6521-8
Mission 205. "An interview with Mutsumi" (六美の面接, Mutsumi no Mensetsu); Mission 206. "The Twins' Secret Mission" (双子大作戦, Futago dai Sakusen); Mission 207. "The Second Mission: Yozakura Frontlines" (第二次夜桜戦線, Dainiji Yozakura Sensen); Mission 208. "Spartan Futaba" (スパルタ二刃, Suparuta Futaba); Mission 209. "Futaba The Tracker" (追跡者二刃, Tsuiseki-sha Futaba); Mission 210. "Guardian Hifumi" (保護者ひふみ, Hogosha Hifumi); Mission 211. "Hifumi & Nii" (ひふみと二, Hifumi to Ni); Mission 212. "Eldest Daughter Vs. Eldest Daughter" (長女vs長女, Chōjo vs Chōjo); Mission 213. "Kazu & Nii" (一と二, Kazu to Ni)
25	August 2, 2024	978-4-08-884134-2	October 20, 2026	978-1-9747-6545-4
Mission 214. "Hifumi's Blooming" (ひふみの開花, Hifumi no Kaika); Mission 215. "Hifumi Vs. Kyoichiro" (ひふみVS凶一郎, Hifumi VS Kyōichirō); Mission 216. "Uncle and Niece" (おじちゃんと姪, Oji-chan to Mei); Mission 217. "Hifumi's Choice" (ひふみの選択, Hifumi no Sentaku); Mission 218. "An Academy Ghost Story" (学校の怪談, Gakkō no Kaidan); Mission 219. "Grown-Up Bad Alpha" (オトナ悪ふぁ, Otona Warufa); Mission 220. "Shinzo VS. Alpha" (辛三VSあるふぁ, Shinzo VS Arufa); Mission 221. "Alpha's Blooming" (あるふぁの開花, Arufa no Kaika); Mission 222. "Precognition" (予知, Yochi)
26	October 4, 2024	978-4-08-884212-7	December 15, 2026	978-1-9747-6561-4
Mission 223. "Legion" (軍団, Gundan); Mission 224. "The Battle Begins" (開戦, Kaisen); Mission 225. "The Second Operation Yozakura Front Lines: Final Stage" (第二次夜桜前線 最終章, Dai ni ji Yozakura Zensen Saishū Shūshō); Mission 225 β. "Yozakura Album" (夜桜アルバム, Yozakura Arubamu); Mission 226. "The Yozakura Entrapment Net" (夜桜包囲網, Yozakura Hōi-mō); Mission 227. "Betrayal" (裏切り, Uragiri); Mission 228. "Kyoichiro & Hai" (凶一郎と灰, Kyōichirō to Hai); Mission 229. "Psych" (なんちって, Nan Chitte); Mission 230. "Prophecy" (予言, Yogen); Mission 231. "Taiyo and Asa" (太陽と旦, Taiyō to Asa)
27	December 4, 2024	978-4-08-884354-4	February 16, 2027	978-1-9747-6629-1
Mission 232. "Kengo and Hulang" (嫌五と虎狼, Kengo to Hǔláng); Mission 233. "Vainglory" (唯我独尊, Yuiga Dokuson); Mission 234. "Cosmetic" (化粧, Keshō); Mission 235. "Ryu's Scoop" (龍の特ダネ, Ryū no Tokudane); Mission 236. "Regenerate" (再生, Saisei); Mission 237. "Asa's Plan" (旦の計画, Asa no Keikaku); Mission 238. "Team Shion" (チーム四怨, Chīmu Shion); Mission 239. "Shion Finale" (全能なる四怨様, Zen'nō naru Shion-sama); Mission 240. "One More Time" (もう一度, Mōichido)
28	February 4, 2025	978-4-08-884432-9	—	—
Mission 241. "Mozu and Dan" (もずと旦, Mozu to Dan); Mission 242. "Regression" (回帰, Kaiki); Mission 243. "Taiyo VS Asa" (夜桜太陽VS旦, Yozakura Taiyō VS Asa); Mission 244. "The Tenth Generation Yozakura Couple" (10代目夜桜夫婦, 10-daime Yozakura Fūfu); Mission 245. "Conquest" (制服, Seifuku); Mission 246. "Commence the Mission" (作戦実行, Sakusen Jikkō); Mission 247. "Kyoichiro's Infiltration" (凶一郎潜入, Kyōichirō Sen'nyū); Mission 248. "Bad Boy" (悪い子たち, Warui ko-tachi); Mission 249. "Busted" (バレる, Bareru)
29	March 4, 2025	978-4-08-884435-0	—	—
Mission 250. "Division" (分割, Bunkatsu); Mission 251. "Awakening" (目覚め, Mezame); Mission 252. "Daybreak" (日の出, Hinode); Mission 253. "Transformation" (変化, Henka); Mission 254. "Battle's End" (決着, Ketchaku); Mission 255. "Taiyo & Kyoichiro" (太陽と凶一郎, Taiyō to Kyōichirō); Mission 256. "Banquet, Part 1" (披露宴 （前編）, Hirōen (Zenpen)); Mission 257. "Banquet, Part 2" (披露宴 （後編）, Hirōen (Kōhen)); Final Mission. "The Yozakura Family's Mission Continues On" (今日も夜桜さんちは大作戦, Kyō mo Yozakura-san Chi wa Daisakusen)
