= Sakura Gakuin discography =

- Studio albums: 11
- Compilation albums: 1
- Singles: 13
- Video albums: 15
- Music videos: 34
- Sub-unit singles: 7
- Sub-unit music videos: 9

Japanese idol group Sakura Gakuin has released eleven studio albums, one compilation album, fifteen video albums, thirty-four music videos, and thirteen singles. Seven more singles and nine more music videos have been released by sub-units, including those by the band Babymetal released prior to March 2013. Studio albums are released annually, under the supertitle Sakura Gakuin [Year] Nendo (さくら学院[Year]年度; lit. 'Cherry Blossom Academy School Year [Year]').

== Studio albums ==
=== Sakura Gakuin 2010 Nendo: Message ===
Sakura Gakuin 2010 Nendo: Message

Studio album by Sakura Gakuin
- Released: April 27, 2011
- Recorded: 2010–2011
- Genre: J-pop
- Length: 42:07
- Language: Japanese
- Label: Toy's Factory

Sakura Gakuin chronology
Sakura Gakuin 2010 Nendo: Message (2011)	Sakura Gakuin 2011 Nendo: Friends (2012)

Singles from Sakura Gakuin 2010 Nendo: Message
- 1. "Dear Mr. Socrates" Released: November 28, 2010; 2. "Yume ni Mukatte" / "Hello! Ivy" Released: December 8, 2010

Sakura Gakuin 2010 Nendo: Message (さくら学院2010年度 〜message〜; lit. 'Cherry Blossom Academy School Year 2010: Message') is the debut studio album by Sakura Gakuin. It charted at number 54 on the Oricon weekly chart. The album was scheduled for release on March 23, 2011, but was postponed due to the March 11 earthquake and tsunami.

"Yume ni Mukatte" / "Hello! Ivy" was released as the lead single on December 8, 2010. "Hello! Ivy" served as a collaboration song with Mono Comme Ça stores in Japan. The group performed at Tower Records Shinjuku on April 30 to commemorate the album release.

"Dear Mr. Socrates" was released as a single by the Baton Club Twinklestars on November 28, 2010. The album marks the first appearance of the aforementioned sub-unit, as well as the Cooking Club Mini-Pati, the Go Home Club Sleepiece, and the Heavy Music Club Babymetal, as well as the only appearance for the Newspaper Club Scoopers. "Doki Doki ☆ Morning" would later be released as a DVD single on October 22, 2011.

Track listing – Standard edition
No.	Title	Lyrics	Music	Arrangement	Length
1.	"Fly Away"	Yuriko Mori	Ryo	Ryo	4:24
2.	"Hello! Ivy"	Toshio-chan	Gō Sakabe	Sakabe	3:34
3.	"Chime" (チャイム)	Shio	Oka Naoki	Naoki	3:51
4.	"Happy Birthday" (ハッピーバースデー) (Mini-Pati)	Genoise	Norizō	Norizō	2:55
5.	"Princess ☆ à la Mode" (プリンセス☆アラモード) (Mini-Pati)	Genoise	Norizō	Matsumoto Takahiro	3:48
6.	"Brand New Day" (Scoopers)	Mukago	Norizō	Matsumoto	3:13
7.	"Dear Mr. Socrates" (Twinklestars)	Reiji Okii	Okii	Okii	4:01
8.	"Medaka no Kyōdai" (めだかの兄妹, "Killfish Siblings") (Sleepiece)	Toyohisa Araki	Takashi Miki	Lit-Hum	3:25
9.	"Doki Doki ☆ Morning" (ド・キ・ド・キ☆モーニング) (Babymetal)	Nakametal	Norizō; Motonari Murakawa	SOH (Oh! S-D); Murakawa	3:45
10.	"Yume ni Mukatte" (夢に向かって, "Toward the Dream")	Mori	Ryo	Ryo	4:18
11.	"Message"	Toshio-chan	Sakabe	Sakabe	4:53
Total length:					42:07

Limited "Sa" edition DVD: Surprise! A Sudden End-of-Year Test
No.	Title	Length
1.	"Yume ni Mukatte" (music clip)
2.	"1st Period: Sakura Gakuin Surprise End-of-Year Test" (1時間目「さくら学院抜き打ち学年末テスト」)
3.	"Cooking Club Mini-Pati Corner" (クッキング部 ミニパティ コーナー)
4.	"Bonus Footage" (特典映像)

Limited "Ku" edition DVD: Class Battle! Fight Softly with Your Hands
No.	Title	Length
1.	"Hello! Ivy" (music clip)
2.	"2nd Period: Sakura Gakuin Earnest Game" (2時間目「さくら学院真剣勝負!!」)
3.	"Baton Club Twinklestars Corner" (バトン部 Twinklestars コーナー)
4.	"Bonus Footage" (特典映像)

Limited "Ra" edition DVD: Love & Peace! The Time to Meet is Right There
No.	Title	Length
1.	"Message" (music clip)
2.	"3rd Period: Sakura Gakuin Break Time – Transfer Students!?" (3時間目「さくら学院休み時間 〜転入生が!? 〜」)
3.	"Heavy Music Club Babymetal × Newspaper Club Scoopers Corner" (重音部 BABYMETAL×新聞部 SCOOPERS コーナー)
4.	"Bonus Footage" (特典映像)

Notes

- "Fly Away", "Hello! Ivy", and "Message" are stylized as "FLY AWAY", "Hello! IVY", and "message", respectively.
- "Princess ☆ à la Mode" is excluded from limited edition releases.
- "Medaka no Kyōdai" is a cover of the 1982 Warabe song of the same name.

=== Sakura Gakuin 2011 Nendo: Friends ===
Sakura Gakuin 2011 Nendo: Friends

Studio album by Sakura Gakuin
- Released: March 21, 2012
- Recorded: 2011–2012
- Genre: J-pop
- Length: 49:11
- Language: Japanese
- Label: Universal J

Sakura Gakuin chronology
Sakura Gakuin 2010 Nendo: Message (2011)	Sakura Gakuin 2011 Nendo: Friends (2012)	Sakura Gakuin 2012 Nendo: My Generation (2013)

Singles from Sakura Gakuin 2011 Nendo: Friends
- 1. "Please! Please! Please!" Released: July 6, 2011; 2. "Friends" Released: November 23, 2011; 3. "Verishuvi" Released: December 21, 2011; 4. "Tabidachi no Hi ni" Released: February 5, 2012; 5. "Babymetal × Kiba of Akiba" Released: March 7, 2012

Sakura Gakuin 2011 Nendo: Friends (さくら学院2011年度 〜FRIENDS〜; lit. 'Cherry Blossom Academy School Year 2011: Friends') is the second studio album by Sakura Gakuin. It charted at number 56 on the Oricon weekly chart, lasting two weeks.

"Verishuvi" was released as the lead single on December 21, 2011. The word comes from the phrase "very very shooby dooba", deriving from words used in scat singing, while the song title means "very happy". "Tabidachi no Hi ni" is a traditional graduation song written in 1991, and was released as the graduation single on March 7, 2012. "Friends" was first performed at the concert Sakura Gakuin 2011 Nendo New: Departure and later released as a single. After leaving the group, Ayami Mutō would later cover the song during her A.Y.M Ballads concert in August 2014.

Track listing
No.	Title	Lyrics	Music	Arrangement	Length
1.	"Verishuvi" (ベリシュビッッ Berishubittsu)	Ikuta Machine	Fujino Takafumi	Harada Nao	4:36
2.	"Friends"	Canon	Canon	Canon	4:11
3.	"Please! Please! Please!" (プリーズ!プリーズ!プリーズ!) (Twinklestars)	Reiji Okii	Okii	Okii	3:44
4.	"Rapikamu" (ラピカム) (Twinklestars)	Yuriko Mori	Yōichi Sakai	Sakai	3:58
5.	"Hashire Shōjiki-mono" (走れ正直者; "Run, Honest Person") (Sleepiece)	Momoko Sakura	Tetsurō Oda	Gakuji Matsuda	3:30
6.	"Yokubari Feuille" (よくばりフィーユ, "Greedy Feuille") (Mini-Pati)	Motonori Inoue	Takeshi Nagai	Sexy-Synthesizer	4:13
7.	"Iine!" (Vega mix Ver.) (いいね！(Vega mix ver.)) (Babymetal)	Nakata Caos	Mish-Mosh	Daiki Kasho	4:11
8.	"Otomegokoro" (オトメゴコロ。, "Maiden's Heart")	Canon	Canon	Canon	3:54
9.	"Pictogram" (ピクトグラム)	Midori Itō	Fumito Nishino; Hiroyuki Ōkawa	Yōichirō Yasuoka	4:10
10.	"3.a.m" (Seniors Ayami, Ayaka, Airi)	Ikuta; Takafumi	Ikuta	Nao	4:44
11.	"See you..."	Mori	Ryo	Ryo	4:25
12.	"Tabidachi no Hi ni" (旅立ちの日に, "On the Day of Departure")	Noboru Kojima	Hiromi Sakamoto	Gō Sakabe	3:35
Total length:					49:11

Limited "Sa" edition DVD: Say! Another Sudden End-of-Year Test
No.	Title	Length
1.	"Verishuvi" (music video)
2.	"Sakura Gakuin School Year 2011 Surprise End-of-Year Test" (さくら学院 2011年度 抜き打ち学年末テスト)
3.	"Sakura Gakuin "Ayami Mutō's Room"" (さくら学院 “武藤彩未の部屋”)
4.	"Psychology Test "True Maiden's Heart": Team Ayaka" (心理テスト 〜本当のオトメゴコロ。〜 Team Ayaka)
5.	"Bonus Footage" (特典映像)

Limited "Ku" edition DVD: The Climax is an Impossible Preduction!?
No.	Title	Length
1.	"Tabidachi no Hi ni" (music video)
2.	"Drama: Yearning for Friends – The Melancholy of Yui Mizuno" (ドラマ「憧れのFRIENDS 〜水野由結の憂鬱〜」)
3.	"Drama: Yearning for Friends – The Ambition of Ayami Mutō" (ドラマ「憧れのFRIENDS 〜武藤彩未の野望〜」)
4.	"Sakura Gakuin "Airi Matsui's Room"" (さくら学院 “松井愛莉の部屋”)
5.	"Psychology Test "True Maiden's Heart": Team Ayami" (心理テスト 〜本当のオトメゴコロ。〜 Team Ayami)
6.	"Bonus Footage" (特典映像)

Limited "Ra" edition DVD: Lights OK! Camera OK! 3.2.1… Action!
No.	Title	Length
1.	"Friends" (music video)
2.	"Let's Make a Music Clip for "Pictogram"!" (「ピクトグラム」のミュージッククリップを作ろう!)
3.	"Sakura Gakuin "Ayaka Miyoshi's Room"" (さくら学院 “三吉彩花の部屋”)
4.	"Psychology Test "True Maiden's Heart": Team Airi" (心理テスト 〜本当のオトメゴコロ。〜 Team Airi)
5.	"Bonus Footage" (特典映像)

Notes

- "Friends" is stylized as "FRIENDS".
- "Hashire Shōjiki-mono" is a cover of the 1991 Hideki Saijō song of the same name.

=== Sakura Gakuin 2012 Nendo: My Generation ===
Sakura Gakuin 2012 Nendo: My Generation

Studio album by Sakura Gakuin
- Released: March 13, 2013
- Recorded: 2012–2013
- Genre: J-pop
- Length: 52:31
- Language: Japanese
- Label: Universal J

Sakura Gakuin chronology
Sakura Gakuin 2011 Nendo: Friends (2012)	Sakura Gakuin 2012 Nendo: My Generation (2013)	Sakura Gakuin 2013 Nendo: Kizuna (2014)

Singles from Sakura Gakuin 2012 Nendo: My Generation
- 1. "Headbangeeeeerrrrr!!!!!" Released: July 4, 2012; 2. "Wonderful Journey" Released: September 5, 2012; 3. "Science Girl ▽ Silence Boy" Released: November 21, 2012; 4. "My Graduation Toss" Released: February 27, 2013

Sakura Gakuin 2012 Nendo: My Generation (さくら学院2012年度 〜My Generation〜; lit. 'Cherry Blossom Academy School Year 2012: My Generation') is the third studio album by Sakura Gakuin. It charted at number 39 on the Oricon weekly chart, lasting two weeks.

"Wonderful Journey" was released as the lead single on September 5, 2012. With the theme of countries around the world, the song makes references to France, Ecuador, Jamaica, and Costa Rica; the latter includes a comparison between the names of member Raura Iida and former President Laura Chinchilla. "My Graduation Toss" was released as the graduation single on February 27, 2013. Suzuka Nakamoto praised Tommy Heavenly^{6} after the single's release, noting its sympathetic feel for graduation in rock style.

Track listing
No.	Title	Lyrics	Music	Arrangement	Length
1.	"Wonderful Journey"	Noriko Fujimoto	Fujimoto	Takahiro Iida; Masayuki Fukutomi	4:21
2.	"Sleep Wonder" (スリープワンダー)	Shō Watanabe	Ryo	Ryo	4:53
3.	"Headbangeeeeerrrrr!!!!!" (ヘドバンギャー！！) (Babymetal)	Edometal; Nakametal	Narasaki	Narametal	4:03
4.	"Miracle ♪ Patiful ♪ Hamburger" (ミラクル♪パティフル♪ハンバーガー) (Mini-Pati)	Emi Inaba	Professor Sakamoto	Sakamoto	4:36
5.	"Suimin Busoku" (すいみん不足, "Lack of Sleep") (Sleepiece)	Chicks	Chicks	Katsutoshi Kitagawa; Yasushi Sakurai	4:12
6.	"Scoreboard ni Love ga Aru" (スコアボードにラブがある, "Love is On the Scoreboard") (Pastel Wind)	Dan Miyakawa	Miyakawa	Miyakawa	4:36
7.	"Science Girl ▽ Silence Boy" (サイエンスガール ▽ サイレンスボーイ) (Kagaku Kyumei Kikoh Logica?)	Ehamic	Ehamic	Ehamic	3:37
8.	"Delta" (デルタ) (Kagaku Kyumei Kikoh Logica?)	Ehamic	Ehamic	Ehamic	4:57
9.	"Sakura-iro no Avenue" (from Suzuka) (桜色のアベニュー from SUZUKA, "Cherry Blossom Colored Avenue")	Hisashi Kondō	Kondō	Kondō	3:57
10.	"My Graduation Toss"	Tomoko Kawase	Shunsaku Okuda	Okuda	5:31
11.	"Marshmallow-iro no Kimi to" (マシュマロ色の君と, "With Marshmallow Colored You")	Yuriko Mori	Ryo	Ryo	4:03
12.	"Tabidachi no Hi ni" (J-Mix 2012) (旅立ちの日に 〜J-MIX 2012〜)	Noboru Kojima	Hiromi Sakamoto	Tsuyoshi Sakabe	3:45
Total length:					52:31

Limited "Sa" edition DVD: Rare Answers in Full Bloom! Sakura Gakuin End-of-Year Test 2012
No.	Title	Length
1.	"My Graduation Toss" (music clip)
2.	"Sakura Gakuin End-of-Year Test 2012" (さくら学院 学年末テスト2012)
3.	"Member Introductions: Nene Sugisaki and Saki Ooga / Hinata Satō and Yui Mizuno" (メンバー他己紹介：杉﨑寧々・大賀咲希 / 佐藤日向・水野由結)

Limited "Ku" edition DVD: Classmates Forever
No.	Title	Length
1.	"Song for Smiling" (music clip)
2.	"A Surprise of Gratitude for Suu-san! Classmates Forever" (すぅさんへ 感謝のサプライズ!〜クラスメイトは永遠に〜)
3.	"Member Introductions: Suzuka Nakamoto and Mariri Sugimoto / Raura Iida and Rinon Isono" (メンバー他己紹介：中元すず香・杉本愛莉鈴/飯田來麗・磯野莉音)

Limited "Ra" edition DVD: Radio Sakura Gakuin
No.	Title	Length
1.	"Wonderful Journey" (music clip)
2.	""Recap on the Radio! Sakura Gakuin History of 2012" Memorable Broadcasts and Precious Footage from 2012!!" (『ラジオで総まとめ! 〜さくら学院 2012年の歩み 〜』2012年度の貴重な映像資料と共に思い出大放送!!)
3.	"Member Introductions: Marina Horiuchi and Moa Kikuchi / Hana Taguchi and Yunano Notsu" (メンバー他己紹介：堀内まり菜・菊地最愛/田口華・野津友那乃)

Notes

- "Wonderful Journey" is stylized as "WONDERFUL JOURNEY".
- "Suimin Busoku" is a cover of the 1990 Chicks song of the same name, serving as an opening theme for the anime adaptation of Kiteretsu Daihyakka.

=== Sakura Gakuin 2013 Nendo: Kizuna ===
Sakura Gakuin 2013 Nendo: Kizuna

Studio album by Sakura Gakuin
- Released: March 12, 2014
- Recorded: 2013–2014
- Genre: J-pop
- Length: 48:37
- Language: Japanese
- Label: Universal J

Sakura Gakuin chronology
Sakura Gakuin 2012 Nendo: My Generation (2013)	Sakura Gakuin 2013 Nendo: Kizuna (2014)	Hōkago Anthology from Sakura Gakuin (2014)

Singles from Sakura Gakuin 2013 Nendo: Kizuna
- 1. "Ganbare!!" Released: October 9, 2013; 2. "Jump Up (Chiisana Yūki)" Released: February 12, 2014

Sakura Gakuin 2013 Nendo: Kizuna (さくら学院2013年度 〜絆〜; lit. 'Cherry Blossom Academy School Year 2013: Bond') is the fourth studio album by Sakura Gakuin. It charted at number 29 on the Oricon weekly chart, lasting two weeks.

"Ganbare!!" was released as the lead single on October 9, 2013. The title is written unconventionally with the kanji for face (顔) and smile (笑), as the Principal of Sakura Gakuin, Mitsuru Kuramoto stated that the standard word (頑張れ) has a connotation of pressure. The second single, "Jump Up (Chiisana Yūki)" was released on February 12, 2014. One of the B-sides is a cover of the Monkees single "Daydream Believer".

Track listing
No.	Title	Lyrics	Music	Arrangement	Length
1.	"Mezase! Super Lady (2013 Nendo)" (目指せ！スーパーレディー -2013年度-, "Aim for a Super Lady! (School Year 2013)")	Hayashi Mori; Ikuta Machine	Kōichi Fujimoto	Fujimoto	4:11
2.	"Makeruna! Seishun Hizakozō" (負けるな！青春ヒザコゾウ, "Don't Lose! Youth Kneecaps")	Arika; Masanco; Miwa	Oka Naoki	Naoki	3:31
3.	"Hana Hana"	Emi Inaba	Eba; Hajime Hyakkoku	Eba; Hyakkoku	4:16
4.	"Ganbare!!" (顔笑れ！！, "Hang In There!!")	Jōya Uenaka	Papparā Kawai	Kawai	5:07
5.	"Shanari Hannari Dorayaki Hime" (しゃなりはんなりどら焼き姫, "Graceful Elegant Dorayaki Princess") (Mini-Pati)	Inaba	Professor Sakamoto	Sakamoto	4:27
6.	"Welcome to My Computer" (Kagaku Kyumei Kikoh Logica?)	Ehamic	Ehamic	Ehamic	4:32
7.	"Yosōijō no Smash" (予想以上のスマッシュ, "Smash More Than Expected") (Pastel Wind)	Dan Miyakawa	Miyakawa	Miyakawa	4:19
8.	"Friends" (Unplugged 2013) (Seniors Marina, Raura, Nene, Hinata)	Canon	Canon	Canon	4:57
9.	"IJI"	Yuriko Mori	Ryo	Ryo	4:16
10.	"Mikansei Silhouette" (未完成シルエット, "Incomplete Silhouette")	Canon	Canon	Gō Sakabe	4:22
11.	"Jump Up (Chiisana Yūki)" (Jump Up 〜ちいさな勇気〜, "Jump Up (A Small Courage)")	Wonderland	Yōichirō Yasuoka	Yasuoka	4:39
Total length:					48:37

Physical bonus track
No.	Title	Remixer	Length
12.	"Non-Stop ☆ Kitaku-bu Zaitaku Wasshoi!!" (Re-mix) (ノンストップ☆帰宅部 在宅わっしょい!!（Re-Mix）) (Sleepiece)	Halfby	6:21
Total length:			54:58

Limited "Sa" edition DVD: "Sakura Gakuin Dream Collaboration with a Top Dancer!" …Is Surely a Huge Panic! Version
No.	Title	Length
1.	"Jump Up (Chiisana Yūki)" (music video)
2.	"Sakura Gakuin End-of-Year Test 2013" (さくら学院 学年末テスト2013)

Limited "Ku" edition DVD: "Ku" Edition Quiz! Who Loves Sakura Gakuin the Most!?
No.	Title	Length
1.	"Hana Hana" (music video)
2.	"Sakura Gakuin Cult Quiz 2013" (さくら学院 カルトクイズ2013)

Limited "Ra" edition DVD: Live “Thank you! Oh my friend”
No.	Title	Length
1.	"Ganbare!!" (music video)
2.	"Unplugged Live" (Seniors Marina Horiuchi, Raura Iida, Nene Sugisaki, Hinata Satō from Sakura Gakuin)

Notes

- "Hana Hana" and "IJI" are stylized as "Hana*Hana" and "I・J・I", respectively.

=== Sakura Gakuin 2014 Nendo: Kimi ni Todoke ===
Sakura Gakuin 2014 Nendo: Kimi ni Todoke

Studio album by Sakura Gakuin
- Released: March 25, 2015
- Recorded: 2014–2015
- Genre: J-pop
- Length: 49:48
- Language: Japanese
- Label: Universal J

Sakura Gakuin chronology
Hōkago Anthology from Sakura Gakuin (2014)	Sakura Gakuin 2014 Nendo: Kimi ni Todoke (2015)	Sakura Gakuin 2015 Nendo: Kirameki no Kakera (2016)

Singles from Sakura Gakuin 2014 Nendo: Kimi ni Todoke
- 1. "Heart no Hoshi" Released: October 15, 2014; 2. "Aogeba Tōtoshi (from Sakura Gakuin 2014)" Released: February 25, 2015

Sakura Gakuin 2014 Nendo: Kimi ni Todoke (さくら学院2014年度 〜君に届け〜; lit. 'Cherry Blossom Academy School Year 2014: Reaching You') is the fifth studio album by Sakura Gakuin. It charted at number 18 on the Oricon weekly chart, lasting two weeks.

"Heart no Hoshi" was released as the lead single on October 15, 2014, and as a DVD single on October 22, 2014. The name comes from the words "heart" and "earth", which share successive letters, expressing the song's message that once everyone's hearts are joined on Earth, the people are united; the Japanese title also uses an alternative reading of the word "earth". After its release, writers Tomoko Kawase and Shunsaku Okuda released a demo of the song. "Aogeba Tōtoshi (from Sakura Gakuin 2014)" was released as the graduation single on February 25, 2015, and as a DVD single on March 4, 2015. Due to the archaic nature of the original lyrics, the meaning was difficult to interpret. During the group's live events, the members made their own interpretations of the song.

Track listing
No.	Title	Lyrics	Music	Arrangement	Length
1.	"Mezase! Super Lady (2014 Nendo)" (目指せ！スーパーレディー -2014年度-)	Hayashi Mori; Ikuta Machine	Kōichi Fujimoto	Fujimoto	3:52
2.	"Animal Rhythm" (アニマリズム Anima Rizumu)	Yūsuke Yamada	Yamada	Yamada	4:21
3.	"Heart no Hoshi" (ハートの地球(ほし), "Heart Earth")	Tommy February6	Shunsaku Okuda	Okuda	5:06
4.	"Spin in the Wind" (Pro-Wrestling Circle)	Kotomi Fukagawa	Yōnosuke Kitamura	Kitamura	3:27
5.	"Tenshi to Akuma" (天使と悪魔, "Angel and Devil") (Twinklestars)	Reiji Okii	Okii	Okii	3:43
6.	"Hirari! Kira Kira ☆ Yami Yami Museum" (ヒラリ!キラキラ☆ヤミヤミミュージアム) (Mini-Pati)	Emi Inaba	Gigandect	Gigandect	3:52
7.	"Piece de Check!" (ピース de Check！) (Koubaibu)	Kimotto (Yocco)	Tiek	Tiek	3:26
8.	"Takaramono" (宝物, "Treasure") (Seniors Moa, Yui, Hana, Yunano)	Inaba	Yūya Suzuki; Tomokazu Miura	Miura	4:53
9.	"Gokigen! Mr. Tropicalorie" (ご機嫌！Mr.トロピカロリー; "Healthy! Mr. Tropicalorie")	The Footles	Kōhei Wada	Wada	3:51
10.	"Aogeba Tōtoshi (from Sakura Gakuin 2014)" (仰げば尊し 〜from さくら学院 2014〜)	Ministry of Education Songbook	Ministry of Education Songbook	KenKen	4:27
11.	"Sayonara, Namida" (さよなら、涙。, "Goodbye, Tears")	Reika Okina	Keiji Tanabe	Tanabe	4:30
12.	"Kimi ni Todoke" (君に届け, "Reaching You")	Canon	Canon	Kōshirō Honda	4:20
Total length:					49:48

Limited "Sa" edition DVD
No.	Title	Length
1.	"Heart no Hoshi" (music video)
2.	"Sakura Gakuin End-of-Year Test 2014" (さくら学院 学年末テスト2014)

Limited "Ku" edition DVD
No.	Title	Length
1.	"Animal Rhythm" (music video)
2.	"A Strange Tube" (奇妙な筒)

Limited "Ra" edition Blu-ray
No.	Title	Length
1.	"Heart no Hoshi" (dance video)
2.	"Animal Rhythm" (music video)
3.	"Aogeba Tōtoshi (from Sakura Gakuin 2014)" (dance video)

=== Sakura Gakuin 2015 Nendo: Kirameki no Kakera ===
Sakura Gakuin 2015 Nendo: Kirameki no Kakera

Studio album by Sakura Gakuin
- Released: March 3, 2016
- Recorded: 2015–2016
- Genre: J-pop
- Length: 51:41
- Language: Japanese
- Label: Amuse

Sakura Gakuin chronology
Sakura Gakuin 2014 Nendo: Kimi ni Todoke (2015)	Sakura Gakuin 2015 Nendo: Kirameki no Kakera (2016)	Sakura Gakuin 2016 Nendo: Yakusoku (2017)

Singles from Sakura Gakuin 2015 Nendo: Kirameki no Kakera
- 1. "Mathematica!" Released: September 27, 2015; 2. "School Days (2015)" Released: December 8, 2015

Sakura Gakuin 2015 Nendo: Kirameki no Kakera (さくら学院2015年度 〜キラメキの雫〜; lit. 'Cherry Blossom Academy School Year 2015: Pieces of Sparkles') is the sixth studio album by Sakura Gakuin. It charted at number 15 on the Oricon weekly chart.

"Mathematica!" was released as the seventh "educational song", with its music video first released as a DVD bonus of the September 2015 issue of Ciao. "School Days (2015)" was rerecorded and released as a DVD single, with a music video (and choreography cut) along with footage from live performances at Tokyo Idol Festival 2015 on August 2, 2015.

Track listing
No.	Title	Lyrics	Music	Arrangement	Length
1.	"School Days"	Yuriko Mori	Gō Sakabe	Sakabe	4:16
2.	"Mezase! Super Lady (2015 Nendo)" (目指せ！スーパーレディー -2015年度-)	Hayashi Mori; Ikuta Machine	Kōichi Fujimoto	Fujimoto	4:10
3.	"Chime"	Shio	Oka Naoki	Naoki	3:50
4.	"Mathematica!" (マセマティカ！)	Kotomi Fukagawa	Yōnosuke Kitamura	Kitamura	4:36
5.	"Jacapara Goo Goo ♡ Omurice" (ジャカパラ Goo Goo ♡ オムライス) (Mini-Pati)	Emi Inaba	Professor Sakamoto	Sakamoto	4:08
6.	"Suimin Busoku" (Sleepiece)	Chicks	Chicks	Katsutoshi Kitagawa; Yasushi Sakurai	4:15
7.	"Piece de Check! (2015)" (ピース de Check！-2015-) (Koubaibu)	Kimotto	Tiek	Tiek	3:26
8.	"Science Girl ▽ Silence Boy" (Kagaku Kyumei Kikoh Logica? :Ver. 1.2)	Ehamic	Ehamic	Ehamic	3:42
9.	"Michishirube" (未知標 ～ミチシルベ～) (Seniors Rinon, Saki Ooga, Saki Shirai)	Sumiyo Mutsumi	Tatsuya Kurauchi	Kay	5:26
10.	"Yakusoku no Mirai" (約束の未来, "Future of Promise")	Mori	Ryo	Ryo	4:47
11.	"Kirameki no Kakera" (キラメキの雫, "Pieces of Sparkles")	Canon	Canon	Kōshirō Honda	4:48
12.	"Yume ni Mukatte"	Mori	Ryo	Ryo	4:17
Total length:					51:41

Limited "Sakura" edition Blu-ray
No.	Title	Length
1.	"Mathematica!" (music video)
2.	"Kirameki no Kakera" (music video)
3.	"Let’s Dance" (Live Video from Sakura Gakuin 5th Anniversary LIVE – For You)

Limited "Gakuin" edition DVD
No.	Title	Length
1.	"Sakura Gakuin School Year 2015 End-of-Year Test – A Careless Confrontation! This Year Has Two Crops Done in a Season" (「さくら学院 2015年度 学年末テスト ～油断大敵！今年は二毛作で大収穫祭～」)
2.	"Showed Us! Sakura Gakuin School Year 2015 Surprise Midterm Test! Special Edition – Autumn Season" (「見せちゃいます！さくら学院2015年度 抜き打ち中間テスト！特別編 ～秋の収穫祭～」)

=== Sakura Gakuin 2016 Nendo: Yakusoku ===
Sakura Gakuin 2016 Nendo: Yakusoku

Studio album by Sakura Gakuin
- Released: March 3, 2017
- Recorded: 2016–2017
- Genre: J-pop
- Length: 57:38
- Language: Japanese
- Label: Amuse

Sakura Gakuin chronology
Sakura Gakuin 2015 Nendo: Kirameki no Kakera (2016)	Sakura Gakuin 2016 Nendo: Yakusoku (2017)	Sakura Gakuin 2017 Nendo: My Road (2018)

Singles from Sakura Gakuin 2016 Nendo: Yakusoku
- 1. "Melodic Solfége" Released: September 17, 2016

Sakura Gakuin 2016 Nendo: Yakusoku (さくら学院2016年度 〜約束〜; lit. 'Cherry Blossom Academy School Year 2016: Promise') is the seventh studio album by Sakura Gakuin. It charted at number 18 on the Oricon weekly chart. Five of the songs have been re-recorded and rearranged by Dr.StrangeLove member Takamune Negishi, with Negishi on bass, Maseeeta on drums, Naoki Hayashibe on guitar, and Yasuhiro Nozaki on keyboard.

"Melodic Solfége" was released as the lead single on September 17, 2016. The song's theme is classical music, and contains elements of Beethoven's "Für Elise" among other classical pieces.

Track listing
No.	Title	Lyrics	Music	Arrangement	Length
1.	"Mezase! Super Lady (2016 Nendo)" (目指せ！スーパーレディー -2016年度-)	Hayashi Mori; Ikuta Machine	Kōichi Fujimoto	Fujimoto	4:13
2.	"Makeruna! Seishun Hizakozō" (New Sound Band ver.)	Arika; Masanco; Miwa	Oka Naoki	Takamune Negishi	3:34
3.	"Song for Smiling" (New Sound Band ver.)	Agree2	Agree2	Negishi	3:41
4.	"Melodic Solfége" (メロディック・ソルフェージュ)	Tomoya Kinoshita	Kinoshita	Kinoshita	5:41
5.	"Dabada ♪ Salad de C'est bon ☆ Avenue" (ダバダ♪サラダ de セボン☆アベニュー) (Mini-Pati)	Emi Inaba	Professor Sakamoto	Sakamoto	3:30
6.	"Hashire Shōjiki-mono" (Sleepiece)	Sakura Momoko	Tetsurō Oda	Gakuji Matsuda	3:33
7.	"Piece de Check! (2016)" (ピース de Check！-2016-) (Koubaibu)	Kimotto	Tiek	Tiek	3:27
8.	"Delta" (Kagaku Kyumei Kikoh Logica? :Ver. 2.0)	Ehamic	Ehamic	Ehamic	4:59
9.	"Yubikiri" (ユビキリ, "Pinky Promise") (Seniors Sara, Mirena)	Takashi Yamaguchi	Yamaguchi	Yamaguchi	4:17
10.	"Marshmallow-iro no Kimi to" (New Sound Band ver.)	Canon	Canon	Negishi	4:08
11.	"Otomegokoro" (New Sound Band ver.)	Canon	Canon	Negishi	3:57
12.	"Mikansei Silhouette" (New Sound Band ver.)	Canon	Canon	Negishi	4:33
13.	"Identity" (アイデンティティ)	Canon	Canon	A-bee	3:48
14.	"Yume ni Mukatte"	Yuriko Mori	Ryo	Ryo	4:17
Total length:					57:38

Limited "Sakura" edition Blu-ray
No.	Title	Length
1.	"Melodic Solfége" (music video)
2.	"Fly Away" (@11/13/2016 Sakura Gakuin Festival ☆ 2016)
3.	"Otomegokoro" (@11/13/2016 Sakura Gakuin Festival ☆ 2016)
4.	"Marshmallow-iro no Kimi to" (@11/13/2016 Sakura Gakuin Festival ☆ 2016)

Limited "Gakuin" edition DVD
No.	Title	Length
1.	"Sakura Gakuin School Year 2016 End-of-Year Test" (「さくら学院 2016年度 学年末テスト」)

Notes

- The pre-release track listing had the positions switched for "Marshmallow-iro no Kimi to" and "Otomegokoro".

=== Sakura Gakuin 2017 Nendo: My Road ===
Sakura Gakuin 2017 Nendo: My Road

Studio album by Sakura Gakuin
- Released: March 3, 2018
- Recorded: 2017–2018
- Genre: J-pop
- Length: 59:28
- Language: Japanese
- Label: Amuse

Sakura Gakuin chronology
Sakura Gakuin 2016 Nendo: Yakusoku (2017)	Sakura Gakuin 2017 Nendo: My Road (2018)	Sakura Gakuin 2018 Nendo: Life Iro Asenai Hibi (2019)

Sakura Gakuin 2017 Nendo: My Road (さくら学院 2017年度 ～My Road～; lit. 'Cherry Blossom Academy School Year 2017: My Road') is the eighth studio album by Sakura Gakuin. Three songs have been re-recorded. The album charted at number sixteen on the Oricon weekly album chart for the week March 12, 2018 with first-week sales of 4,226 copies.

Track listing
No.	Title	Lyrics	Music	Arrangement	Length
1.	"Mezase! Super Lady (2017 Nendo)" (目指せ！スーパーレディー -2017年度-)	Hayashi Mori; Ikuta Machine	Kōichi Fujimoto	Fujimoto	4:15
2.	"Fly Away" (New Sound Band ver.)	Yuriko Mori	Ryo	Ryo	4:05
3.	"IJI" (New Sound Band ver.)	Mori	Ryo	Ryo	4:15
4.	"Sleep Wonder" (New Sound Band ver.)	Shō Watanabe	Ryo	Ryo	4:55
5.	"Capsule Scope"	Ikuta	Kushita Mine	Kushita	3:41
6.	"Nee" (ねぇ) (Perfume cover)	Yasutaka Nakata	Nakata	Dan Miyakawa	4:10
7.	"Futari Kotoba" (ふたりことば, "Two People's Words") (Aiko Yamaide)	Aiko Yamaide	Yamaide	Miki Aihara	3:48
8.	"Akindo ☆ Soul" (あきんど☆魂) (Koubaibu)	Mirai Show	Mirai Show	Mirai Show	3:43
9.	"Mirai Dokei" (未来時計, "Clock of the Future") (Seniors Aiko, Megumi, Momoko)	Ryūji Sakai	Wiggy	Yōichirō Yasuoka	4:23
10.	"Sayonara, Namida"	Reika Okina	Keiji Tanabe	Tanabe	4:30
11.	"Magic Melody"	Mahō no i-rando Yumekore with Miho Karasawa	Hiroo Yamaguchi	Yamaguchi	4:36
12.	"My Road"	Canon	Kōshirō Honda	Honda	3:51
13.	"Message"	Toshi-chan	Gō Sakabe	Sakabe	4:52
14.	"Yume ni Mukatte"	Mori	Ryo	Ryo	4:18
Total length:					59:22

Limited "Sakura" edition Blu-ray
No.	Title	Length
1.	"My Road" (music video)
2.	"Otomegokoro" (live from 11/18/2017 Sakura Gakuin Festival ☆ 2017)
3.	"Marshmallow-iro no Kimi to" (live from 11/18/2017 Sakura Gakuin Festival ☆ 2017)
4.	"Message" (live from 11/18/2017 Sakura Gakuin Festival ☆ 2017)

Limited "Gakuin" edition DVD
No.	Title	Length
1.	"Sakura Gakuin School Year 2017 End-of-Year Test" (「さくら学院 2017年度 学年末テスト」)

Notes

- The pre-release contained an alternative track listing.

=== Sakura Gakuin 2018 Nendo: Life Iro Asenai Hibi ===
Sakura Gakuin 2018 Nendo: Life Iro Asenai Hibi

Studio album by Sakura Gakuin
- Released: March 3, 2019
- Recorded: 2018–2019
- Genre: J-pop
- Language: Japanese
- Label: Amuse

Sakura Gakuin chronology
Sakura Gakuin 2017 Nendo: My Road (2018)	Sakura Gakuin 2018 Nendo: Life Iro Asenai Hibi (2019)	Sakura Gakuin 2019: Story (2020)

Sakura Gakuin 2018 Nendo: Life Iro Asenai Hibi (さくら学院 2018年度 ～Life 色褪せない日々～; lit. 'Cherry Blossom Academy School Year 2018: Unfading Days of Life') is the ninth studio album by Sakura Gakuin.

Track listing
No.	Title	Lyrics	Music	Arrangement	Length
1.	"Mezase! Super Lady (2018 Nendo)" (目指せ！スーパーレディー -2017年度-)	Hayashi Mori; Ikuta Machine	Kōichi Fujimoto		4:15
2.	"Wonderful Journey"	Noriko Fujimoto	Noriko Fujimoto		4:19
3.	"Verishuvi"	Ikuta	Fujino Takafumi		4:37
4.	"Heart no Hoshi"	Tommy February6	Shunsaku Okuda		5:04
5.	"Gokigen! Mr. Tropicalorie"	The Footles	Kōhei Wada		3:48
6.	"C'est la vie" (Art Performance Unit “trico dolls”)	EHAMIC	EHAMIC	EHAMIC	5:01
7.	"Clover" (Seniors Yuzumi, Maaya, Marin)				4:42
8.	"Jump Up (Chiisana Yuki)" (あきんど☆魂) (Koubaibu)	Wonderland	Yōichirō Yasuoka		4:40
9.	"Fairy Tale"				3:40
10.	"Friends"	Canon	Canon		4:13
11.	"Carry On"	Canon	Canon	Kohta Yamamoto	5:33
12.	"Yakusoku no Mirai"	Mori	Ryo		4:43
13.	"Yume ni Mukatte"	Mori	Ryo		4:18
Total length:					58:53

Limited "Sakura" edition Blu-ray
No.	Title	Length
1.	"Fairy Tale" (music video)	4:06
2.	"Carry On" (music video)	5:59

Limited "Gakuin" edition DVD
No.	Title	Length
1.	"Sakura Gakuin School Year 2018 End-of-Year Test: Charmed This Year! At the End of the Heisei Period, A Rank Competition Full of Ups and Downs" (さくら学院 2018年度 学年末テスト ～今年も魅せます！平成最後、波乱万丈の順位争奪戦～)	59:03

=== Sakura Gakuin 2019 Nendo: Story ===
Sakura Gakuin 2019 Nendo: Story

Studio album by Sakura Gakuin
- Released: March 3, 2020
- Recorded: 2019–2020
- Genre: J-pop
- Language: Japanese
- Label: Amuse

Sakura Gakuin chronology
Sakura Gakuin 2018 Nendo: Life Iro Asenai Hibi (2019)	Sakura Gakuin 2019 Nendo: Story (2020)	Sakura Gakuin 2020 Nendo: Thank You (2021)

Sakura Gakuin 2019 Nendo: Story (さくら学院 2019年度 ～Story～; lit. 'Cherry Blossom Academy School Year 2019: Story') is the tenth studio album by Sakura Gakuin.

Track listing
No.	Title	Lyrics	Music	Length
1.	"Mezase! Super Lady (2019 Nendo)" (目指せ！スーパーレディー -2019年度-)	Hayashi Mori; Ikuta Machine	Kōichi Fujimoto	4:17
2.	"Hello! IVY"	Toshio-chan	Gō Sakabe	3:33
3.	"Hana*Hana"	Emi Inaba	Eba; Hajime Hyakkoku	4:19
4.	"Ganbare!!" (顔笑れ!!)	Jōya Uenaka	Papparā Kawai	5:15
5.	"#Aoharu Hakusho" (#アオハル白書)	Takashi Yamaguchi	Koshiro Honda	2:55
6.	"Let's Dance"		Yōichirō Yasuoka	2:39
7.	"Merry Xmas to You"		Koshiro Honda	4:21
8.	"Monochrome"	Yuriko Mori	Canon	4:08
9.	"Crossroad" (Seniors Kano, Soyoka, Tsugumi, Momoe)	Kōhei Wada	Kōhei Wada	4:50
10.	"My Graduation Toss"	Tommy heavenly6	Shunsaku Okuda	5:30
11.	"Marshmallow Iro no Kimi to" (マシュマロ色の君と)	Canon	Canon	4:04
12.	"Mikansei Silhouette" (未完成シルエット)	Canon	Canon	4:27
13.	"Tabidachi no Hi ni ~J-MIX~" (旅立ちの日に)	Noburo Kojima	Hiromi Sakamoto	3:44
14.	"Yume ni Mukatte" (夢に向かって)	Yuriko Mori	Ryo	4:18
Total length:				58:20

Limited "Sakura" edition Blu-ray
No.	Title	Length
1.	"#Aoharu Hakusho" (music video)	3:35
2.	"Merry Xmas to You" (Maihama Amphitheater live on 12/24/2019)	4:40

Limited "Gakuin" edition DVD
No.	Title	Length
1.	"Sakura Gakuin School Year 2019 End-of-Year Test" (さくら学院 2019年度 学年末テスト)	1:11:16

=== Sakura Gakuin 2020 Nendo: Thank You ===
Sakura Gakuin 2020 Nendo: Thank You

Studio album by Sakura Gakuin
- Released: August 7, 2021
- Recorded: 2020–2021
- Genre: J-pop
- Language: Japanese
- Label: Amuse

Sakura Gakuin chronology
Sakura Gakuin 2019 Nendo: Story (2020)	Sakura Gakuin 2020 Nendo: Thank You (2021)

Sakura Gakuin 2020 Nendo: Thank You (さくら学院 2020年度 ～Thank you～; lit. 'Cherry Blossom Academy School Year 2020: Thank You') is the eleventh and final studio album by Sakura Gakuin.

Track listing
No.	Title	Lyrics	Music	Length
1.	"School Days"	Yuriko Mori	Gō Sakabe	4:16
2.	"Mezase! Super Lady (2020 Nendo)" (目指せ！スーパーレディー -2020年度-)	Hayashi Mori; Ikuta Machine	Kōichi Fujimoto	4:15
3.	"Song For Smiling"	Agree2	Agree2	3:41
4.	"Capsule Scope"	Ikuta	Kushita Mine	3:41
5.	"Animal Rhythm" (アニマリズム)	Yūsuke Yamada	Yūsuke Yamada	4:21
6.	"Chime" (チャイム)	Shio	Oka Naoki	3:50
7.	"FLY AWAY"	Yuriko Mori	Ryo	4:24
8.	"Otomegokoro." (オトメゴコロ。)	Canon	Canon	3:57
9.	"Fairy Tale"			3:40
10.	"Friends"	Canon	Canon	4:13
11.	"The Days ～New Departure～" (The Days ～新たなる旅立ち～)	Canon	Kōshirō Honda
12.	"Thank You..."	Yuriko Mori; Canon	Kōshirō Honda	4:27
13.	"Yume ni Mukatte" (夢に向かって)	Mori	Ryo	4:18

"Sakura" edition Blu-ray
No.	Title	Length
1.	"The Days ～New Departure～" (music video)
2.	"10th Anniversary Sakura Gakuin☆2020 ～Departure～" (concert)

"Gakuin" edition DVD
No.	Title	Length
1.	"Sakura Gakuin School Year 2020 End-of-Year Test:" (さくら学院 2018年度 学年末テスト ～今年も魅せます！平成最後、波乱万丈の順位争奪戦～)
2.	"10th Anniversary Skit 2020 Gamushara! Homeroom Drama" (10th Anniversary寸劇2020年度がむしゃら！ホームルーム奮闘劇)

== Compilation albums ==
=== Hōkago Anthology from Sakura Gakuin ===
Hōkago Anthology from Sakura Gakuin

Compilation album by Sakura Gakuin
- Released: May 5, 2014
- Recorded: 2010–2014
- Genre: J-pop
- Language: Japanese
- Label: Universal J

Sakura Gakuin chronology
Sakura Gakuin 2013 Nendo: Kizuna (2014)	Hōkago Anthology from Sakura Gakuin (2014)	Sakura Gakuin 2014 Nendo: Kimi ni Todoke (2015)

Hōkago Anthology from Sakura Gakuin (放課後アンソロジー from さくら学院; lit. 'After-School Anthology from Cherry Blossom Academy') is a compilation album by Sakura Gakuin, containing only songs performed by sub-units. It charted at number 96 on the Oricon weekly chart.

Track listing
No.	Title	Sub-unit	Length
1.	"Dear Mr. Socrates" (from Message)	Twinklestars
2.	"Please! Please! Please!" (from Friends)	Twinklestars
3.	"Scoreboard ni Love ga Aru" (from My Generation)	Pastel Wind
4.	"Medaka no Kyōdai" (from Message)	Sleepiece
5.	"Ningen tte Iina" (にんげんっていいな; "Good to Be Human")	Sleepiece
6.	"Suimin Busoku" (from My Generation)	Sleepiece
7.	"Yokubari Feuille" (from Friends)	Mini-Pati
8.	"Miracle ♪ Patiful ♪ Hamburger" (from My Generation)	Mini-Pati
9.	"Doki Doki ☆ Morning" (from Message)	Babymetal
10.	"Science Girl ▽ Silence Boy" (from My Generation)	Kagaku Kyumei Kikoh Logica?
11.	"Delta" (from My Generation)	Kagaku Kyumei Kikoh Logica?
12.	"Brand New Day" (from Message)	Scoopers

Bonus track
No.	Title	Sub-unit	Length
1.	"Science Girl ▽ Silence Boy" (80kidz Remix)	Kagaku Kyumei Kikoh Logica?

== Video albums ==
Title	Album details	Peak		
Title	Album details	Oricon Music DVD	Oricon Blu-ray	Oricon Music Blu-ray
Sakura Gakuin First Live & Documentary 2010 to 2011: Smile (さくら学院 FIRST LIVE & DOCUMENTARY 2010 to 2011～SMILE～)	Released: June 27, 2012; Label: Amuse Soft; Format: DVD	53	—N/a	
Sakura Gakuin Sun! Matome (さくら学院SUN! -まとめ-; 'Sakura Gakuin Sun! Summary')	Released: February 27, 2013; Label: Amuse; Format: DVD	165	—N/a	
The Road to Graduation Final: Sakura Gakuin 2012 Nendo Sotsugyō (The Road to Graduation Final ～さくら学院2012年度 卒業～; 'The Road to Graduation Final: Sakura Gakuin School Year 2012 Graduation')	Released: July 3, 2013; Label: Universal J; Format: DVD	31	—N/a	
Sakura Gakuin Festival ☆ 2013: Live Edition (さくら学院祭☆2013年 ‐Live Edition‐)	Released: February 12, 2014; Label: Universal J Music; Format: DVD	31	—N/a	
Sakura Gakuin The Road to Graduation 2013: Kizuna (さくら学院 The Road to Graduation 2013 ～絆～; 'Sakura Gakuin The Road to Graduation 2013: Bond')	Released: July 23, 2014; Label: Universal J Music; Format: DVD	34	—N/a	
Sakura Gakuin The Road to Graduation 2014: Kimi ni Todoke (さくら学院 The Road to Graduation 2014 ～君に届け～; 'Sakura Gakuin The Road to Graduation 2014: Reaching You')	Released: July 7, 2015; Label: Amuse; Format: DVD, Blu-ray	—	8	2
The Road to Graduation 2015: Kirameki no Kakera (The Road to Graduation 2015 ～キラメキの雫～; 'The Road to Graduation 2015: Pieces of Sparkles')	Released: July 7, 2016; Label: Amuse; Format: DVD, Blu-ray	—	17	6
Shuoh Gakuen (秋桜学園 合唱部; 'Shuoh Gakuen: Choral Club')	Released: November 3, 2016; Label: Amuse; Format: DVD	—	—N/a	
The Road to Graduation 2016: Yakusoku (The Road to Graduation 2016 ～約束～; 'The Road to Graduation 2016: Promise')	Released: July 7, 2017; Label: Amuse; Format: DVD, Blu-ray	15	13	4
Sakura Gakuin Festival 2017 (さくら学院祭☆2017; 'Sakura Gakuin Festival ☆ 2017')	Released: February 14, 2018; Label: Amuse; Format: DVD, Blu-ray	14	6	3
The Road to Graduation 2017: My Road (The Road to Graduation 2017 ～My Road～)	Released: July 7, 2018; Label: Amuse; Format: DVD, Blu-ray	17	–	8
Sakura Gakuin Festival 2018 (さくら学院祭☆2018; 'Sakura Gakuin Festival ☆ 2018')	Released: February 14, 2019; Label: Amuse; Format: DVD, Blu-ray	–	6	2
The Road to Graduation 2018: Life Iro Asenai Hibi (The Road to Graduation 2018 ～Life 色褪せない日々～; 'The Road to Graduation 2018: Unfading Days of Life')	Released: July 7, 2019; Label: Amuse; Format: DVD, Blu-ray	–	–	10
Sakura Gakuin Festival 2019 (さくら学院祭☆2019; 'Sakura Gakuin Festival ☆ 2019')	Released: February 14, 2020; Label: Amuse; Format: DVD, Blu-ray	–	-	-
The Road to Graduation 2019: Story (The Road to Graduation 2019 ～Story～)	Released: December 8, 2020; Label: Amuse; Format: DVD, Blu-ray	–	–	-

== Singles ==
=== Main group ===
Year	Title	Peak				Other songs	Album
Year	Title	Oricon Singles	Oricon DVD	Oricon Music DVD	Japan Hot 100	Other songs	Album
2010	"Yume ni Mukatte" / "Hello! Ivy"	35	—	—	—	"School Days"	Sakura Gakuin 2010 Nendo: Message
2011	"Friends"	—	—	—	—		Sakura Gakuin 2011 Nendo: Friends
2011	"Verishuvi"	29	—	—	—	"Sakura Hyakunin Isshu" (さくら百人一首)	Sakura Gakuin 2011 Nendo: Friends
2012	"Tabidachi no Hi ni"	14	—	—	93	"Tabidachi no Hi ni" (J-Mix) "Planet Episode 008"	Sakura Gakuin 2011 Nendo: Friends
2012	"Wonderful Journey"	23	—	—	—	"Marshmallow-iro no Kimi to" "Song for Smiling"	Sakura Gakuin 2012 Nendo: My Generation
2013	"My Graduation Toss"	13	—	—	—	"Magic Melody" "Mezase! Super Lady" (目指せ！スーパーレディー; 'Aim for a Super Lady!')	Sakura Gakuin 2012 Nendo: My Generation
2013	"Ganbare!!"	6	—	—	60	"Pumpkin Parade" "Welcome to My Computer" (Kagaku Kyumei Kikoh Logica?) "Acha! Cha! Curry" (あちゃ！ちゃ！カリー; 'Oops! Tea! Curry') (Mini-Pati)	Sakura Gakuin 2013 Nendo: Kizuna
2014	"Jump Up (Chiisana Yūki)"	25	—	—	—	"Capsule Scope" "Day Dream Believer" (Seniors Marina, Raura, Nene, Hinata) "Yosōijō no Smash" (Pastel Wind)	Sakura Gakuin 2013 Nendo: Kizuna
2014	"Heart no Hoshi"	—	4	3	—		Sakura Gakuin 2014 Nendo: Kimi ni Todoke
2015	"Aogeba Tōtoshi (from Sakura Gakuin 2014)"	—	4	2	—		Sakura Gakuin 2014 Nendo: Kimi ni Todoke
2015	"Mathematica!"	—	—	—	—		Sakura Gakuin 2015 Nendo: Kirameki no Kakera
2015	"School Days (2015)"	—	—	—	—	"Hello! Ivy" "Yume ni Mukatte"	Sakura Gakuin 2015 Nendo: Kirameki no Kakera
2016	"Melodic Solfége"	—	—	—	—		Sakura Gakuin 2016 Nendo: Yakusoku
2020	"Thank You..."	—	—	—	—		Sakura Gakuin 2020 Nendo: Thank You

=== Twinklestars ===
Year	Title	Peak	Other songs	Album
Year	Title	Oricon	Other songs	Album
2010	"Dear Mr. Socrates"	—		Sakura Gakuin 2010 Nendo: Message
2011	"Please! Please! Please!"	67	"Tenshi to Akuma"	Sakura Gakuin 2011 Nendo: Friends

=== Babymetal ===
Year	Title	Peak		Other songs	Album
Year	Title	Oricon Singles	Japan Hot 100	Other songs	Album
2011	"Doki Doki ☆ Morning"	—	—		Sakura Gakuin 2010 Nendo: Message
2012	"Babymetal × Kiba of Akiba" (with Kiba of Akiba)	46	—	"Party @the BBS" "Kimi to Anime ga Mitai – Answer for Animation With You" (featuring You) "Doki Doki ☆ Morning" (Ver. Koa)	Sakura Gakuin 2011 Nendo: Friends
2012	"Headbangeeeeerrrrr!!!!!"	20	—	"Uki Uki ★ Midnight"	Sakura Gakuin 2012 Nendo: My Generation
2013	"Ijime, Dame, Zettai"	6	14	"Catch Me If You Can" "Babymetal Death" "Ijime, Dame, Zettai" (Nemesis ver.)	Non-album single

=== Kagaku Kyumei Kikoh Logica? ===
Year	Title	Peak	Other songs	Album
Year	Title	Oricon	Other songs	Album
2012	"Science Girl ▽ Silence Boy"	49	"Yume o Hodoku Riron" (ユメを解く理論; 'Theory to unwrap dreams') "Ima Element" (with Element Girls)	Sakura Gakuin 2012 Nendo: My Generation

== Music videos ==
Year	Title	Artist	Director(s)	Ref.
2010	"Yume ni Mukatte"	Sakura Gakuin	Takatoshi Tsuchiya	
2010	"Hello! Ivy"	Sakura Gakuin	Takatoshi Tsuchiya	
2011	"Message"	Sakura Gakuin	Unknown	
2011	"Dear Mr. Socrates"	Twinklestars	Yasuyuki Yamaguchi	
2011	"Please! Please! Please!"	Twinklestars	Yasuyuki Yamaguchi	
2011	"Doki Doki ☆ Morning"	Babymetal	Shimon Tanaka	
2011	"Verishuvi"	Sakura Gakuin	Hideaki Fukui	
2012	"Tabidachi no Hi ni"	Sakura Gakuin	Choku	
2012	"Friends"	Sakura Gakuin	Tetsurō Chiba	
2012	"Pictogram"	Sakura Gakuin	Hinata Satō and Nene Sugisaki	
2012	"Iine!"	Babymetal	Daishinszk	
2012	"Song for Smiling"	Sakura Gakuin	Hideaki Fukui	
2012	"Headbangeeeeerrrrr!!!!!"	Babymetal	Hidenobu Tanabe	
2012	"Babymetal Death"	Babymetal	Unknown	
2012	"Wonderful Journey"	Sakura Gakuin	Wataru Saitou	
2012	"Science Girl ▽ Silence Boy"	Kagaku Kyumei Kikoh Logica?	Zumi (Soichi Nakazumi)	
2012	"Ima Element"	Kagaku Kyumei Kikoh Logica? with Element Girls	Gaku Yamaguchi (Fiseman)	
2012	"Ijime, Dame, Zettai"	Babymetal	Kamimetal	
2013	"My Graduation Toss"	Sakura Gakuin	Smith	
2013	"Hana Hana"	Sakura Gakuin	Zumi	
2013	"Ganbare!!"	Sakura Gakuin	Mao Muramatsu	
2014	"Jump Up (Chiisana Yūki)"	Sakura Gakuin	Shoichi David Haruyama	
2014	"Animal Rhythm"	Sakura Gakuin	Zumi (Z-Cup)	
2014	"Heart no Hoshi"	Sakura Gakuin	Zumi (Z-Cup)	
2015	"Aogeba Tōtoshi (from Sakura Gakuin 2014)"	Sakura Gakuin	Yasuhiro Arafune	
2015	"Mathematica!"	Sakura Gakuin	Rena Hamane	
2015	"School Days"	Sakura Gakuin	Smith	
2016	"Kirameki no Kakera"	Sakura Gakuin	Yū Katsumata	
2016	"Melodic Solfége"	Sakura Gakuin	Kyotaro Hayashi	
2017	"My Road"	Sakura Gakuin	Unknown	
2018	"Fairy Tale"	Sakura Gakuin	Unknown	
2018	"Carry On"	Sakura Gakuin	Unknown	
2019	"Aoharu Hakusho"	Sakura Gakuin	Unknown	
2021	"The Days (New Departure)"	Sakura Gakuin	ZUMI	
