= Moa Kikuchi =

Japanese singer and dancer (born 1999)

Moa Kikuchi 菊地 最愛
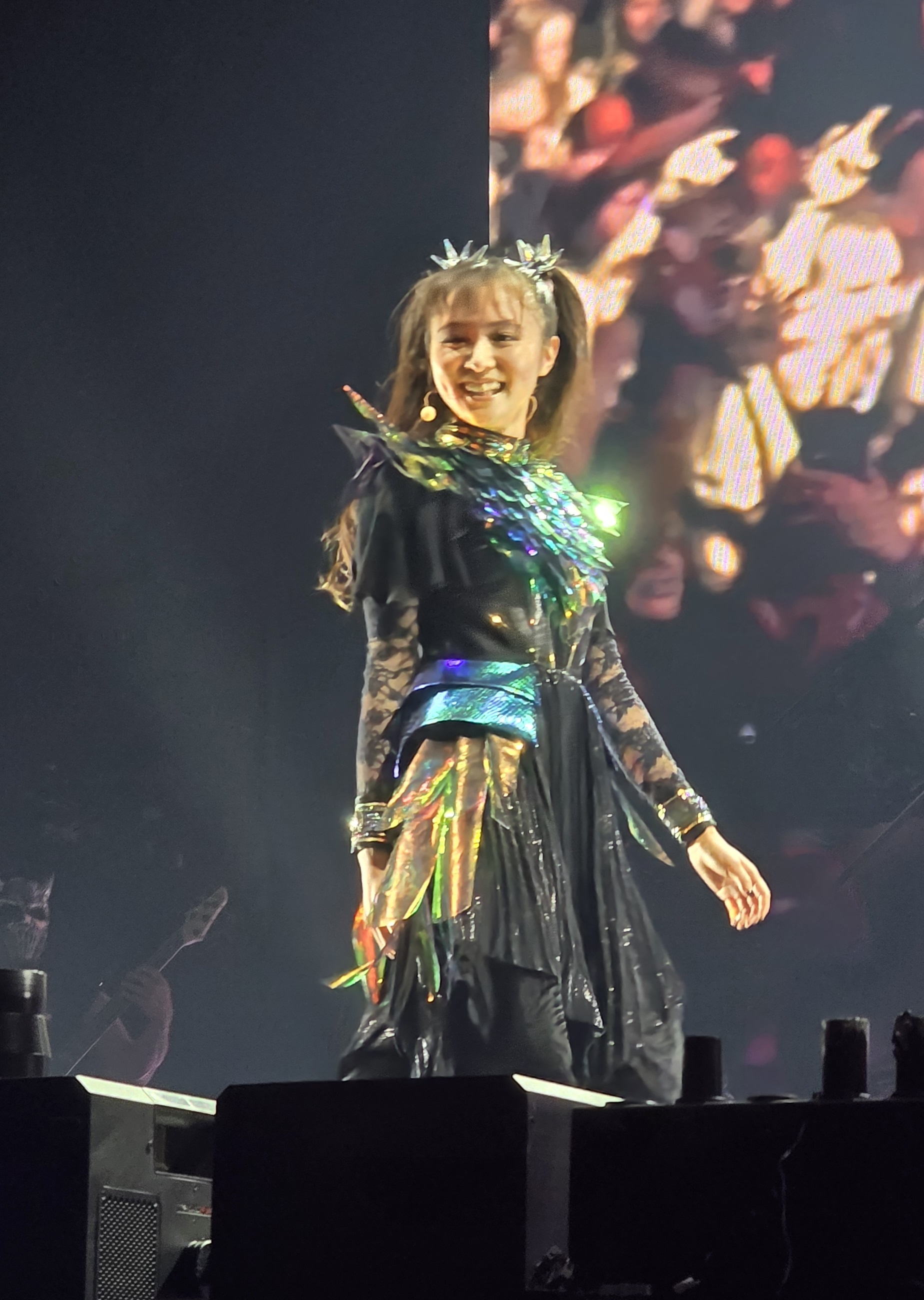
- Kikuchi performing in May 2025

Background information
- Also known as: Moametal
- Born: July 4, 1999 (age 27); Nagoya, Japan
- Genres: Kawaii metal; heavy metal; J-pop; power metal; alternative metal
- Occupations: Singer; dancer
- Years active: 2010–present
- Label: Amuse Inc.
- Member of: Babymetal
- Formerly of: Sakura Gakuin

Moa Kikuchi (菊地 最愛, Kikuchi Moa; born July 4, 1999), better known by her stage name Moametal, is a Japanese singer and dancer. She is best known as a member of the kawaii metal band Babymetal, and was formerly a member of the idol group Sakura Gakuin. She is represented by the talent agency Amuse Inc.

== Early life ==
Kikuchi was born in Nagoya on July 4, 1999. She is an only child. Before she was born, her mother was approached by a talent agent but chose not to join the entertainment industry.

== Career ==
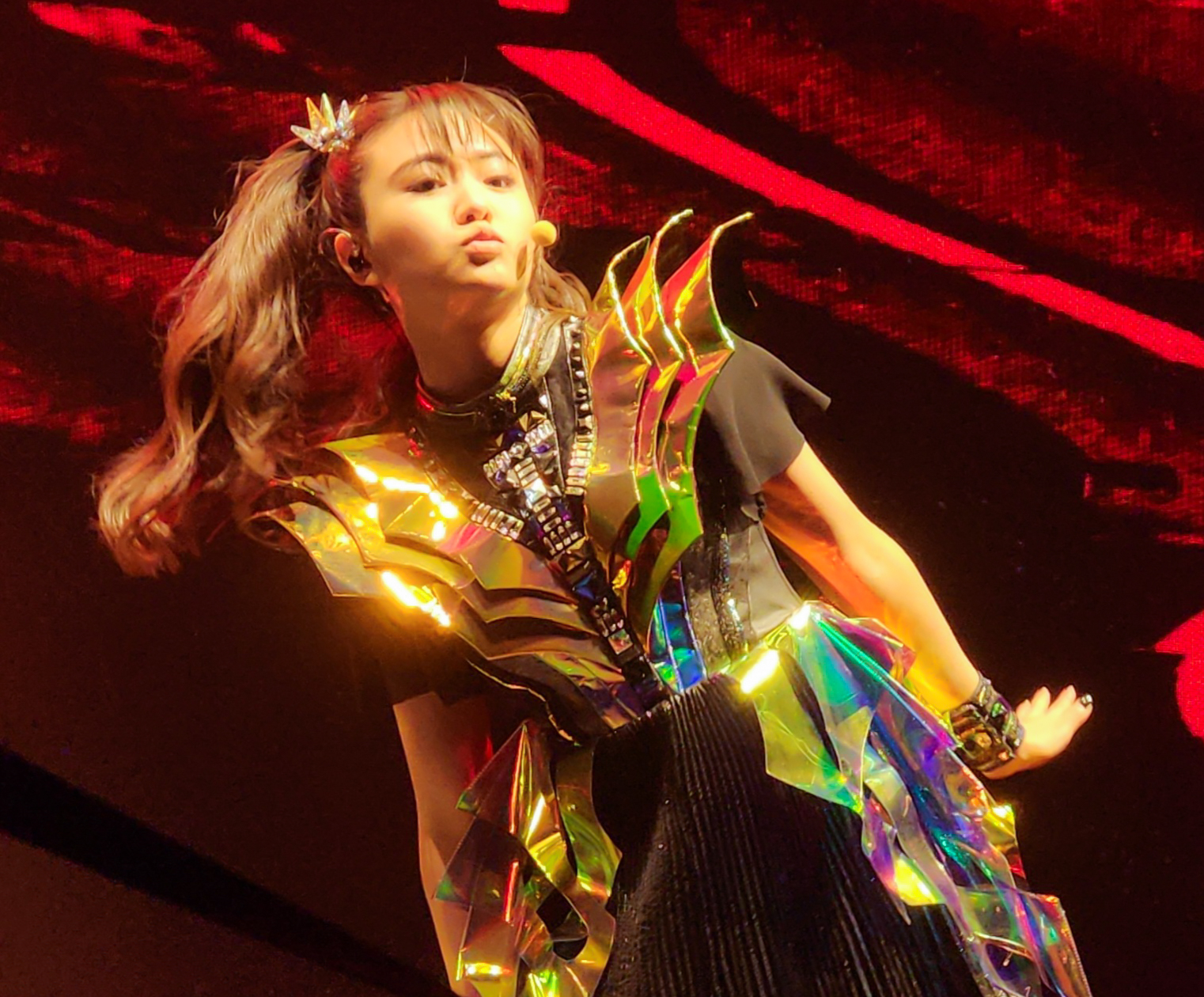
Kikuchi performing in 2023

Kikuchi was signed to the talent agency Amuse Inc. at the age of eight, after winning Semi-Grand Prix (becoming a runner-up) in the company's 2007 Ciao Girl Audition. On August 2, 2010, at the age of 11, she joined Amuse's school-themed idol group Sakura Gakuin, which had not yet released its debut single. She joined the group alongside Yui Mizuno, who would later become her bandmate in Babymetal. During their audition, the two performed a dance cover of "Over the Future" by Karen Girl's, two members of which—Ayami Mutō and Suzuka Nakamoto—had since joined Sakura Gakuin; Nakamoto would later join Kikuchi and Mizuno in Babymetal, completing the trio.

Besides performing as a group, Sakura Gakuin members were also divided into smaller subgroups themed around school clubs. Each club had its own musical group that recorded its own songs. Kikuchi and Mizuno first became members of the Baton Club and its musical group Twinklestars. As backing singers and dancers, they were later teamed with lead singer Nakamoto in the Heavy Music Club, with the associated music group being named Babymetal. Each member was also given a corresponding stage name consisting of their first name followed by "metal", with Kikuchi becoming "Moametal". Before this, none of the trio knew what heavy metal music was.

Babymetal became an independent trio upon Nakamoto's "graduation" from Sakura Gakuin in 2013, while Kikuchi and Mizuno graduated in 2015 and began performing with Babymetal exclusively. The two gained a writing credit under the name of their Babymetal subgroup duo, Black Babymetal, on the band's self-titled debut album in 2014; they wrote "Song 4" together during a bus trip. Babymetal have since toured extensively around the world and released the albums Metal Resistance (2016), Metal Galaxy (2019), The Other One (2023), and Metal Forth (2025).

== Personal life ==
Kikuchi is a self-described otaku for Japanese idols, which was notably mentioned as part of her introduction in the Sakura Gakuin song "Mezase! Super Lady". (Note: The lyrics were updated annually to accommodate member lineup changes.) Her favorite idol group is °C-ute and she is a friend of Airi Suzuki, her favorite former member of the group. She has mentioned Bring Me the Horizon, Limp Bizkit, Måneskin, and Metallica as some of her favorite bands. She enjoys watching anime, with her favorite show being Love Live! School Idol Project.

== Associated acts ==
- Sakura Gakuin (2010–2015)
  - Twinklestars (Sakura Gakuin sub-unit)
  - Mini-Pati (Sakura Gakuin sub-unit)
- Babymetal (2010–present)
  - Black Babymetal (Babymetal sub-unit)

== Discography ==
=== With Sakura Gakuin ===
- Sakura Gakuin 2010 Nendo: Message (2011)
- Sakura Gakuin 2011 Nendo: Friends (2012)
- Sakura Gakuin 2012 Nendo: My Generation (2013)
- Sakura Gakuin 2013 Nendo: Kizuna (2014)
- Sakura Gakuin 2014 Nendo: Kimi ni Todoke (2015)

=== With Babymetal ===
- Babymetal (2014)
- Metal Resistance (2016)
- Metal Galaxy (2019)
- The Other One (2023)
- Metal Forth (2025)

== Filmography ==
=== Film ===
- Heavier Trip (2024), Moametal
