= Yui Mizuno =

Japanese singer (born 1999)

Yui Mizuno 水野 由結
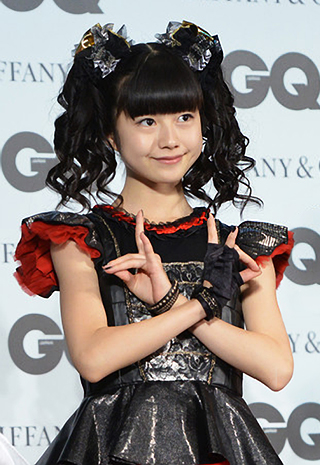
- Mizuno in August 2015

Background information
- Also known as: Yuimetal
- Born: June 20, 1999 (age 27); Kanagawa Prefecture, Japan
- Genres: Kawaii metal; heavy metal; J-pop; power metal; alternative metal
- Occupations: Singer; dancer
- Years active: 2010–2018
- Label: Amuse Inc. (2009–2025)
- Formerly of: Babymetal; Sakura Gakuin

Yui Mizuno (水野 由結, Mizuno Yui; born June 20, 1999), better known as Yuimetal, is a Japanese former singer and dancer. She became known as a member of the kawaii metal group Babymetal and the idol group Sakura Gakuin. After being absent from Babymetal since 2017, she officially left the band due to undisclosed health issues in 2018, but remained under contract with their talent agency Amuse Inc. until 2025, when Amuse confirmed that she had left the agency and wished to pursue opportunities away from the entertainment industry.

== Early life ==
Yui Mizuno was born in Kanagawa Prefecture on June 20, 1999. She has one older brother and one younger brother. She was a childhood fan of Karen Girl's, a group featuring her future Babymetal and Sakura Gakuin bandmate Suzuka Nakamoto, and had dreamed of joining the group after their music helped her endure a family member's life-threatening illness. When Karen Girl's disbanded, she attended their farewell concert and met all three members. Later, during Babymetal's Legend "D" concert in 2012, the band performed a cover of the Karen Girl's song "Over the Future". Mizuno cited this as the moment her "dreams came true".

== Career ==
In August 2010, at the age of 11, Mizuno was signed by the talent agency Amuse Inc. and joined its school-themed idol group Sakura Gakuin, which had not yet released its debut single. She joined the group alongside Moa Kikuchi, who would later become her bandmate in Babymetal. During their audition, the two performed a dance cover of "Over the Future" by Karen Girl's, two members of which—Ayami Mutō and Suzuka Nakamoto—had since joined Sakura Gakuin; Nakamoto would later join Mizuno and Kikuchi in Babymetal, completing the trio, and Mizuno would become close friends with Mutō.

Besides performing as a group, Sakura Gakuin members were also divided into smaller subgroups themed around school clubs. Each club had its own musical group that recorded its own songs. Mizuno and Kikuchi first became members of the Baton Club and its musical group Twinklestars. As backing singers and dancers, they were later teamed with lead singer Nakamoto in the Heavy Music Club, with the associated music group being named Babymetal. Each member was also given a corresponding stage name consisting of their first name followed by "metal", with Mizuno becoming "Yuimetal". Before this, none of the three members knew what heavy metal music was.

Babymetal became an independent trio upon Nakamoto's "graduation" from Sakura Gakuin in 2013, while Mizuno and Kikuchi graduated in 2015 and began performing with Babymetal exclusively. The two gained a writing credit under the name of their Babymetal subgroup duo, Black Babymetal, on the band's self-titled debut album in 2014; they wrote "Song 4" together during a bus trip. The second Babymetal album, Metal Resistance, was released in 2016 and would be Mizuno's last with the band.

Mizuno was absent from the Babymetal concert Legend S: Baptism XX in December 2017 and subsequently from their American tour in May 2018, with no advance warning given to fans. Amid speculation about her status with the group, a representative of Babymetal's American management company 5B Management replied to an inquiry from Alternative Press Magazine, stating that "Yuimetal remains a member of the band, but she is not on this current U.S. tour". However, she was also absent from Babymetal's European tour the following month. On October 19, Babymetal officially confirmed that she had left the group due to undisclosed health issues, stating that she had "expressed her desire to return to performing with the group [...] after last December's performance" but had ultimately decided to leave the band. Mizuno explained that she "had a strong desire to stand on the stage again" but was "still not in good physical condition" and that she hoped to pursue her childhood dream of having a solo career in the future. Despite her inactivity, she remained under contract with Babymetal's talent agency Amuse Inc.

On September 30, 2025, Amuse Inc. officially confirmed that Mizuno had left the agency and the entertainment industry as a whole. The company released a statement which read, "After many discussions with [Mizuno], we have come to respect her wish to step away from the world of entertainment and to live life at her own pace. As such, we have agreed to bring her contract with us to an end at this time. We would like to take this opportunity to express our deepest gratitude to all the fans and everyone involved for your unwavering support over the years. Although she will no longer be part of our company, we sincerely wish to continue supporting [Mizuno] as she begins this next chapter of her life. We would be most grateful if you support her warmly for her personal decision."

== Associated acts ==
- Sakura Gakuin (2010–2015)
  - Twinklestars (Sakura Gakuin sub-unit)
  - Mini-Pati (Sakura Gakuin sub-unit)
- Babymetal (2010–2018)
  - Black Babymetal (Babymetal sub-unit)

== Discography ==
=== With Sakura Gakuin ===
- Sakura Gakuin 2010 Nendo: Message (2011)
- Sakura Gakuin 2011 Nendo: Friends (2012)
- Sakura Gakuin 2012 Nendo: My Generation (2013)
- Sakura Gakuin 2013 Nendo: Kizuna (2014)
- Sakura Gakuin 2014 Nendo: Kimi ni Todoke (2015)

=== With Babymetal ===
- Babymetal (2014)
- Metal Resistance (2016)

== Filmography ==
=== Television ===
- MW Dai-Zero-shō: Akuma no Game (MW－ムウ－ 第0章 ～悪魔のゲーム～) (2009)
- Sagasō! Nippon Hito no Wasuremono (2009)
- Kioku no Umi (2010)

=== Film ===
- A Happy Birthday (2009)
