= Raura Iida =

Japanese singer and actress

- 飯田 來麗
- Born: 9 April 1998 (age 27); Tokyo, Japan
- Occupations: Singer, actress
- Years active: 2007–present
- Height: 1.59 m (5 ft 3 in)
- Website: fanicon.net/fancommunities/2618

Raura Iida (飯田 來麗, Iida Raura; born 9 April 1998) is a Japanese singer and actress, represented by the agency Amuse Inc. until March 2018. She is a former member of the idol group Sakura Gakuin and its sub-units Twinklestars, Sleepiece, and Minipati. She was the co-presenter of a live stream programme Spica no Yoru (スピカの夜) with Yuika Shima until the series ended in September 2017. She was affiliated with Japan Music Entertainment from 2021 to 2023. On 5 July 2023, she announced that she will be leaving Japan Music Entertainment and continue her work as an independent actress.

== Discography ==
=== With Sakura Gakuin ===
- Sakura Gakuin 2010 Nendo: Message (2011)
- Sakura Gakuin 2011 Nendo: Friends (2012)
- Sakura Gakuin 2012 Nendo: My Generation (2013)
- Sakura Gakuin 2013 Nendo: Kizuna (2014)

== Filmography ==
=== Film ===
- Shindō (2007)
- Tengoku wa Mattekureru (2007)

=== Television ===
- Chia Doru (2015), Haruka Satō
- Aogeba Tōtoshi (2016), Raura Kadowaki
