= Onipan! =

Japanese anime television series

- Key visual

おにぱん!
- Created by: Norihiro Naganuma; Shogakukan-Shueisha Productions
- Anime television series
- Directed by: Masahiko Ohta
- Written by: Takashi Aoshima
- Music by: Yasuhiro Misawa
- Studio: Wit Studio
- Licensed by: Sentai Filmworks
- Original network: TV Tokyo (via Oha Suta)
- Original run: April 11, 2022 – July 1, 2022
- Episodes: 12 (60 parts)

Onipan! (おにぱん!) is an original Japanese anime television series created by Norihiro Naganuma, animated by Wit Studio and produced by Shogakukan-Shueisha Productions. It is directed by Masahiko Ohta and written by Takashi Aoshima, with Yasuhiro Misawa composing the music. It aired from April to July 2022 on TV Tokyo's children's variety program Oha Suta.

== Characters ==
Tsutsuji (つつじ; lit "Azalea")
Voiced by: Yume Nozaki
Himawari (ひまわり; lit "Sunflower")
Voiced by: Mika Negishi
Tsuyukusa (つゆくさ; lit "Dayflower")
Voiced by: Kokona Nonaka
Momo Momozono (桃園 桃, Momozono Momo)
Voiced by: Kaori Maeda
Noriko Issun (一寸 法子, Issun Noriko)
Voiced by: Miyu Tomita
Kuma (クマ)
Voiced by: Kikuko Inoue

== Production and release ==
The original anime television series created by Norihiro Naganuma and produced by Shogakukan-Shueisha Productions was announced on February 3, 2022, which comes from AAO Project, a joint initiative by AOI Pro., Amuse, and Origamix Partners to develop and produce original intellectual property. Masahiko Ohta is directing the anime at Wit Studio, with Jun'ichirō Hashiguchi serving as assistant director, Takashi Aoshima writing the scripts, and Yasuhiro Misawa composing the music. Original onikko designs are provided by Tomari, while Ryuuta Yanagi designs the characters. The series aired from April 11 to July 1, 2022, on TV Tokyo's children's variety program Oha Suta. The first theme song is "Onipapapan! Pan!". The second theme song is "Oni Yaba—!". Both theme songs were performed by Onipan's! (Yume Nozaki, Mika Negishi, and Kokona Nonaka). Sentai Filmworks has licensed the series outside of Asia.

=== Episodes ===
No.	Title (Note: All English titles are taken from HIDIVE.)	Directed by (Note: Information is taken from the ending credits of each episode.)	Written by	Storyboarded by	Original release date
1	"Three Onikko, On the Scene!"; Transliteration: "Jōriku! Sannin no Onikko!" (Japanese: 上陸！３人のおにっ子！)	Ryūtarō Awabe	Takashi Aoshima	Masahiko Ohta	April 11, 2022 - April 15, 2022
2	"Momomomomomomomomo!"; Transliteration: "Mōmmommommommommo!" (Japanese: もーっもっもっもっもっもっ！)	Shintarō Itoga	Takashi Aoshima	Takaharu Ōkuma	April 18, 2022 - April 22, 2022
3	"Onikko, On the Town!"; Transliteration: "Onikko, Shōtengai ni Arawaru" (Japanese: おにっ子、商店街に現る)	Shōgo Arai	Yasunori Yamada	Shōgo Arai	April 25, 2022 - April 29, 2022
4	"Oni Love Clubs!"; Transliteration: "Bukatsudō no Oni!" (Japanese: 部活動の鬼！)	Tomoko Hiramuki	Kenji Sugihara	Shintarō Nakazawa; Shigenori Hirozumi (Note: 3D Part Storyboard (3Dパートコンテ))	May 2, 2022 - May 6, 2022
5	"Momo Battle Royale!"; Transliteration: "Gekitō! Momo Rowaiyaru!!" (Japanese: 激闘！モモロワイヤル！！)	Junichirō Hashiguchi	Takamitsu Kōno	Nagisa Miyazaki	May 9, 2022 - May 13, 2022
6	"Legendary Idol Noririn"; Transliteration: "Aidoru Densetsu Noririn" (Japanese: アイドル伝説のりりん)	Ryūtarō Awabe	Takamitsu Kōno	Masahiko Ohta	May 16, 2022 - May 20, 2022
7	"What a Scoop! Kuma's Real Identity Revealed?!"; Transliteration: "Sukūpu! Kuma no Shōtai wa Marumaru!?" (Japanese: スクープ！クマの正体はOO！？)	Ryūtarō Awabe; Ryūta Yanagi (Note: Pirate Part Direction (海賊パート演出))	Yasunori Yamada	Ryūtarō Awabe; Ryūta Yanagi (Note: Pirate Part Storyboard (海賊パート絵コンテ))	May 23, 2022 - May 27, 2022
8	"Farewell, Onipan?!"; Transliteration: "Sayonara Onipan!?" (Japanese: さよならおにぱん！？)	Tomoko Hiramuki	Kenji Sugihara	Akira Nishimori	May 30, 2022 - June 3, 2022
9	"The Oni Return to a Culture Festival!"; Transliteration: "Oni no Inuma ni Bunkamatsuri!" (Japanese: 鬼の居ぬ間に文化祭！)	Shōgo Arai	Kenji Sugihara	Shōgo Arai	June 6, 2022 - June 10, 2022
10	"You're Watching Onikko Channel!"; Transliteration: "Onikko☆Channeru Hajime Mashita" (Japanese: おにっこ☆チャンネルはじめました)	Junichirō Hashiguchi; Hina Nakahata (Note: Assistant Direction (演出補佐))	Takamitsu Kōno	Masahiko Ohta	June 13, 2022 - June 17, 2022
11	"Our Next Top Idols: The Oni Project!"; Transliteration: "Mezase Aidoru? ONI Purojekuto!" (Japanese: 目指せアイドル？ONIプロジェクト！)	Shō Gōbara; Shōgo Arai	Yasunori Yamada	Hiroaki Shimura	June 20, 2022 - June 24, 2022
12	"A Legendary Battle! Onikko Forever!"; Transliteration: "Densetsu Batoru! Onikko Tachi yo, Eien ni――" (Japanese: 伝説バトル！ おにっ子たちよ、永遠に――)	Ryūtarō Awabe	Takashi Aoshima	Masahiko Ohta	June 27, 2022 - July 1, 2022

== See also ==
- My Friend's Little Sister Has It In for Me! and Spy Classroom, light novel series illustrated by original onikko designer, Tomari
