= Hinata Satō =

Japanese actress

- 佐藤 日向
- Born: 23 December 1998 (age 27); Yamagata Prefecture, Japan
- Occupations: Actor; voice actress; singer; model
- Years active: 2010–present
- Agent: Amuse
- Notable work: Love Live! Sunshine!! as Leah Kazuno; Revue Starlight as Junna Hoshimi; D4DJ as Noa Fukushima; Hatsune Miku: Colorful Stage! as Mizuki Akiyama
- Height: 159 cm (5 ft 3 in)

Hinata Satō (佐藤 日向, Satō Hinata; born 23 December 1998) is a Japanese actress, voice actress, singer, and model affiliated with Amuse. She is a former member of Sakura Gakuin and is best known for voicing Junna Hoshimi in Revue Starlight, Leah Kazuno in Love Live! Sunshine!!, Noa Fukushima in D4DJ, and Mizuki Akiyama in Hatsune Miku: Colorful Stage!.

== Biography ==
Hinata Satō was born on 23 December 1998 in Yamagata Prefecture and two years later moved to Niigata Prefecture where she lived until third grade. Admiring Ayami Mutō, she started performing arts activities around kindergarten.

She successfully auditioned for the idol unit Sakura Gakuin, and she started activities for the unit in April 2010. She was appointed "mood chair" at the unit's 2013 Transference Ceremony held on 5 May. She graduated from the unit in March 2014.

She voiced Rin Karasawa, a major character in the anime Kutsudaru., which began on 2 April 2014. She formed the unit Maboroshi Love with three other cast members (Marina Horiuchi, Miki Kanai, and Yuika Shima), and they released the single "Merry Go World" for the anime on 19 November of the same year, which charted at number 90 on the Oricon singles chart.

She performed as Cynthia in The Goodbye Girl at the Tokyo International Forum Hall C in August 2015. She also portrayed Alice in Stray Sheep Paradise and its sequel.

She voiced Leah Kazuno in Love Live! Sunshine!!, and performed in the Saint Snow concert held at Hakodate Arena in April 2018 with her Saint Snow bandmate Asami Tano. She also voiced Junna Hoshimi in Revue Starlight. She has also appeared in other Starlight media, including the Shōjo Konto All-Starlight web series, the Re Live video game, the stage adaptation, and the Radio Starlight radio show.

== Filmography ==
=== Live-action ===
2010

- Hagane no Onna Season 1, episodes 1–7

2011

- Hagane no Onna Season 2, episodes 1, 2, 6, and 9

2016

- Shin Yameken no Onna season 2

2017

- Byplayers, episode 5
- Saki ni umareta dake no Boku, episode 7

2018

- Boys Over Flower Season 2, episode 1

=== Anime ===
- KutsuDaru., Rin Karasawa
- Love Live! Sunshine!!, Leah Kazuno
- Revue Starlight, Junna Hoshimi
- D4DJ First Mix, Noa Fukushima
- D4DJ Petit Mix, Noa Fukushima
- My Stepmom's Daughter Is My Ex, Chikuma Tanesato
- Uncle's Obsession with Cute Things, Greapy

=== Film ===
- Love Live! Sunshine!! The School Idol Movie Over the Rainbow, Leah Kazuno
- Colorful Stage! The Movie: A Miku Who Can't Sing, Mizuki Akiyama
- Mobile Suit Gundam Hathaway: The Sorcery of Nymph Circe, Betchy

=== Web ===
- Shōjo Konto All-Starlight, 2019, Junna Hoshimi

=== Radio ===
- Radio Starlight

=== Video games ===
2018

- Shōjo Kageki Revue Starlight -Re LIVE-, Junna Hoshimi
- Kōsei Shōjo: Do The Scientists Dream of Girls'Asterism?, Alperg

2019

- Project Sekai Colorful Stage! feat. Hatsune Miku, Mizuki Akiyama

2022

- Umamusume: Pretty Derby, K.S. Miracle

2024

- Revue Starlight El Dorado, Junna Hoshimi

=== Stage ===
2015

- The Goodbye Girl, Cynthia

2016

- Cosmos Gakuen Chorus Club, Asuka Sakurai

2017

- Revue Starlight the Live, Junna Hoshimi

2018

- Stray Sheep Paradise, Alice

2019

- Stray Sheep Paradise:em, Alice

2023

- Akiba Maid War, Nagomi Wahira
- Kageki Shojo!!, Sawa Sugimoto

== Others ==
2017

- Tsūkai TV Sukatto Japan

2019

- D4DJ, Noa Fukushima
