= Sakura Gakuin =

Japanese girl group

Sakura Gakuin さくら学院
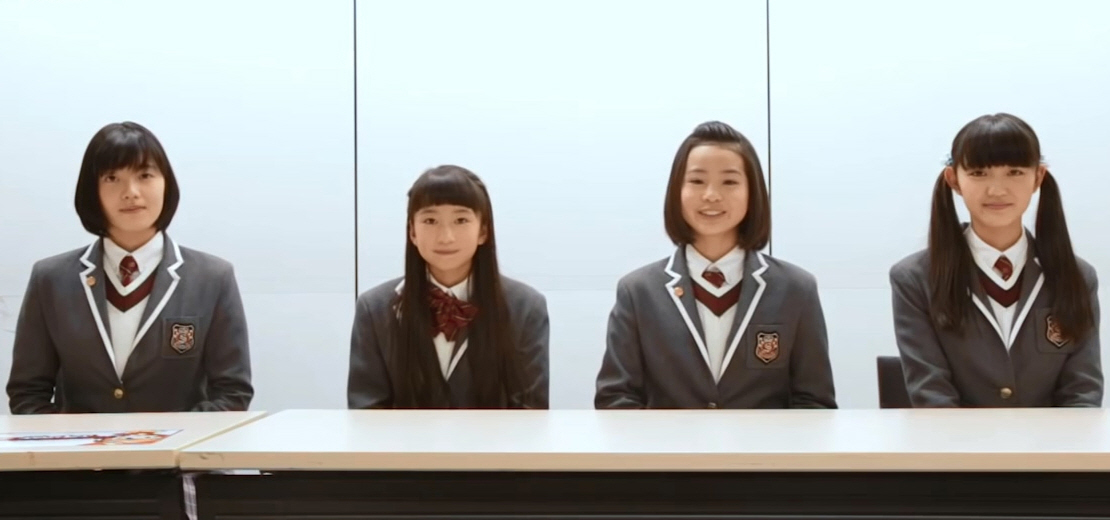
- Sakura Gakuin in March 2017; L–R: Sara Kurashima, Tsugumi Aritomo, Yuzumi Shintani, and Maaya Asō

Background information
- Origin: Japan
- Genre: J-pop
- Years active: 2010–2021
- Labels: Toy's Factory (2010–2011); Universal Music Japan (2011–2015)
- Spinoffs: Babymetal; @onefive
- Members: Miku Tanaka; Miki Yagi; Kokona Nonaka; Yume Nozaki; Sana Shiratori; Sakia Kimura; Neo Satō; Miko Todaka
- Past members: See list of past members
- Website: sakuragakuin.jp

Sakura Gakuin (Japanese: さくら学院; lit. 'Cherry Blossom Academy') was a Japanese idol girl group formed in 2010 by the Amuse talent agency. The group's membership fell within the age range of Japanese compulsory education, typically containing between 10 and 12 members at a time who fall between the ages of 10 and 15. With the theme of school life and extracurricular club activities, when the academic year ends at the end of March, the group released an annual studio album, new members "transferred in" to the group, and others who finish compulsory education "graduated", or left.

Members of the group also belonged to one or more of its sub-units, which are modeled after school extracurricular clubs. Each club performed with its own theme and musical genre, and their music may be included in the main group's albums or released as a separate single.

The group disbanded on August 31, 2021.

== Concept ==
The group functioned as a "unit limited to the growing period" (成長期限定ユニット, seichō-ki gentei yunitto), typically containing between 10 and 12 members at a time who fall between the ages of 10 and 15, and therefore are between fifth and ninth grade. The group was themed around the idea of school life and extracurricular activities, featuring a "principal", Mitsuru Kuramoto (倉本美津留), "teacher" Hayashi Mori (森ハヤシ; often referred to as "Mori-sensei"), and sub-units designated as "clubs". The group released an album annually in mid-March, the month marking the end of the academic year (年度, nendo), leading to a concert at the end of the month in which the most senior members "graduate", or leave, in accordance with having finished their compulsory education. Each May, new members from lower grades "transferred in" to the group.

== History ==
=== 2010–2011: Beginnings and Message ===
Sakura Gakuin was created around April 2010 by the talent agency Amuse Inc. Members of the group often blogged in a class journal by posting notes handwritten on loose leaf paper. In August, the group participated in the first Tokyo Idol Festival (TIF). In October, the group formed the baton-twirling sub-unit Twinklestars, with seven members; in November, the group released its first single "Dear Mr. Socrates", which was sold only at live venues. Sakura Gakuin held its first solo event on November 28, 2010. On December 8, the group released its major debut single "Yume ni Mukatte / Hello! Ivy".

Sakura Gakuin's first album, Sakura Gakuin 2010 Nendo: Message, was scheduled for release on March 23, 2011, but was postponed until April 27 due to the March 11 earthquake and tsunami. The same year, Hana Taguchi and Rinon Isono joined the group. On May 30, Twinklestars announced a new single, "Please! Please! Please!", for a July 6 release. In August, Sakura Gakuin performed at Tokyo Idol Festival 2011. On October 23, at an event held in Tokyo, the group announced that second single, "Verishuvi", would be released on December 21 through Universal Music; the song had its live debut on November 23.

=== 2012: Friends, formation of more sub-units, and My Generation ===
Sakura Gakuin's third single, "Tabidachi no Hi ni", was released on February 15, 2012, debuting at number 6 on the daily Oricon Singles Chart for February 14. Three of the members, Ayami Mutō, Ayaka Miyoshi, and Airi Matsui, graduated from Sakura Gakuin in March 2012, and three new members—Yunano Notsu, Saki Ooga and Mariri Sugimoto—were transferred into the group in May 2012. In August, the group performed at TIF 2012, on August 4 and 5, and revealing that a new sub-unit would perform at the Sky Stage on the 4th; the following day, it was revealed to be a tennis club consisting of four members with Nene Sugisaki as the leader. On September 1, the science club Kagaku Kyumei Kikoh Logica? was officially revealed as another new unit. On October 1, the Logica? announced their first single, "Science Girl ▽ Silence Boy", for a November 21 release. On October 6, Babymetal announced their major label debut with "Ijime, Dame, Zettai" for January 9, 2013.

=== 2013–2015: New look, Kizuna, and Kimi ni Todoke ===
Sakura Gakuin released their fifth single, "My Graduation Toss", on February 27, 2013, as well as their third album My Generation on March 13. The group held the 2012 graduation concert for Suzuka Nakamoto and Mariri Sugimoto at Tokyo International Forum on March 31.

After seeing off fellow members Suzuka and Mariri, the group started their new school semester on May 5, 2013 at Shibuya Cultural Center Owada with two new members and a new beige uniform. The group later released the song, "Ganbare!!", which ranked 6th on the Oricon Weekly Chart. Sakura Gakuin later released their seventh single, "Jump Up (Chiisana Yūki)", and fourth DVD, Sakura Gakuin Festival 2013: Live Edition on February 12, 2014. The Road to Graduation 2013 Final was held at Shibuya Public Hall on March 30, 2014 where Marina Horiuchi, Raura Iida, Nene Sugisaki and Hinata Satō, the last of the original eight members, gave their farewells to the fans and remaining eight members.

The group later welcomed two new members, Sara Kurashima and Megumi Okada, in May 2014, bringing the total to ten members. In March 2015, the group held a graduation concert at which Moa Kikuchi, Yui Mizuno, Hana Taguchi, and Yunano Notsu bid goodbye to the fans and remaining six members. On May 6, 2015, Kano Fujihira, Soyoka Yoshida, Momoko Okazaki, Mirena Kurosawa, Maaya Asō, and Marin Hidaka joined the group, bringing the total to twelve members. At the same time, Rinon Isono was appointed as the fifth Student Council President. The remaining two Year 3 members, Saki Ooga became the Education Chairman, while Saki Shirai was appointed as the third Talk Chairman.

=== 2016–2019: Kirameki no Kakera, Yakusoku, My Road, Life Iro Asenai Hibi, and Story ===
March 2016 marked the departure of Saki Ooga, Saki Shirai and Rinon Isono, but in May of the same year Momoe Mori, Tsugumi Aritomo and Yuzumi Shintani transferred in. 2016 also marked the departure of the "beige" uniforms, instating a gray one in its place, and the promotion of Sara Kurashima to class president, Aiko Yamaide to vice president and Mirena Kurosawa to MC chairman. Sara and Mirena left the group in March 2017, with new members Miku Tanaka and Miki Yagi joining in May. Aiko Yamaide became the class president, Megumi Okada became the talk chairman, Momoko Okazaki became the perseverance ("ganbare") chairman, and Maaya Asō became the Education Chairman. On March 24, 2018, the graduation concert for Aiko, Megumi and Momoko took place at Nakano Sun Plaza.

In May 2018, Sana Shiratori, Kokona Nonaka and Yume Nozaki joined the group. During the concert in which the new members were introduced, it was announced that Yuzumi Shintani had become class president, with Maaya Asō as talk chairman, Marin Hidaka as breakthrough ("hamidase") chairman, Kano Fujihira as performance chairman, and Soyoka Yoshida as education chairman.

On March 30, 2019, Maaya, Marin, and Yuzumi graduated from Sakura Gakuin. 2019 also marked the departure of the grey uniforms, enlisting a deep blue one in its place. On May 6, Neo Sato, Miko Todaka, and Sakia Kimura joined the group. It was also announced that Kano Fujihira had become class president, with Soyoka Yoshida as perseverance chairman, Tsugumi Aritomo as breakthrough chairman, and Momoe Mori as talk chairman. On October 19, 2019, during the encore of Sakura Gakuin Festival 2019, it was revealed that Kano, Soyoka, Tsugumi, and Momoe had formed @onefive from within Sakura Gakuin as an independent spin-off unit, and they performed "Pinky Promise" for the first time.

A concert was planned to occur on March 29, 2020, to mark the graduations of Kano, Soyoka, Tsugumi and Momoe. However, it was postponed to May 29 due to the COVID-19 pandemic, and then subsequently canceled. An alternative, livestream-only graduation concert later took place on August 30.

=== 2020–2021: Tenth anniversary and disbandment ===
On September 1, 2020, it was announced that Sakura Gakuin would continue as an 8-member group until their disbandment on August 31, 2021. All eight of the remaining members were given a position on the student council, with Kokona Nonaka as the tenth and final Student Council President. Sana Shiratori became the Talk Chairman, Miki Yagi became the third vice-president, and Miku Tanaka became the second spirit chairman, with Yume Nozaki as the first and only PR chairman, Neo Sato as the fourth education chairman, Miko Todaka as the third performance chairman, and Sakia Kimura as the first and only "reckless" chairman and also the youngest Sakura Gakuin member to ever be appointed onto the student council. On June 5, 2021, Sakura Gakuin held an online live concert to celebrate its tenth anniversary, titled 10th Anniversary Sakura Gakuin 2020: The Days. The group held their final concert on August 29, 2021 at Nakano Sun Plaza, before disbanding two days later.

== Legacy ==
Sakura Gakuin's sub-unit Babymetal continued to perform as an independent act long after the disbandment of its parent group, embarking on multiple international tours, and celebrating its fifteenth anniversary in January 2026. The girl group @onefive, which also spun out of Sakura Gakuin, sampled "Heart no Hoshi", "Verishuvi", and "Doki Doki Morning" in its Sakura Gakuin-themed music card Sakuraization on June 24, 2026.

== Members ==
Sakura Gakuin employed a line-up changing system in which older members would leave the group and new members joined each year. Since the group's theme was that of an elementary and junior high school, when a member graduated from junior high, specifically her third year, she would leave Sakura Gakuin as well, during a ceremony the group held around the end of the Japanese school year (late March) in which these members would "graduate".

At the time of the group's disbandment, the group consisted of the following eight members. The names presented here are in Western format (i.e. given name followed by family name) as opposed to Japanese name format.

Name	Date of birth	Prefecture of origin	Grade in year of disbandment	Notes
Sana Shiratori (白鳥 沙南)	June 20, 2005 (age 21)	Kumamoto	Junior high year 3	7th Talk Chairperson
Kokona Nonaka (野中 ここな)	January 28, 2006 (age 20)	Nagasaki	Junior high year 3	10th Student Council President
Miku Tanaka (田中 美空)	June 18, 2006 (age 20)	Ōita	Junior high year 2	2nd Spirit Chairperson
Miki Yagi (八木 美樹)	December 11, 2006 (age 19)	Osaka	Junior high year 2	3rd Student Council Vice-President
Neo Satō (佐藤 愛桜)	December 1, 2006 (age 19)	Saga	Junior high year 2	4th Education Chairperson
Miko Todaka (戸高 美湖)	August 14, 2006 (age 20)	Hiroshima	Junior high year 2	3rd Performance Chairperson
Yume Nozaki (野崎 結愛)	November 15, 2007 (age 18)	Aichi	Junior high year 1	1st PR Chairperson
Sakia Kimura (木村 咲愛)	February 20, 2009 (age 17)	Tokyo	Elementary school year 6	1st Reckless Chairperson

=== Past members ===
Members that leave Sakura Gakuin also complete ninth grade education in school, and are considered "graduated".

Graduation date	Name	Date of birth	Prefecture of origin	Notes
March 25, 2012	Ayami Mutō (武藤 彩未)	April 29, 1996 (age 30)	Ibaraki	First student council president (2010-2011); Past member of Karen Girl's
March 25, 2012	Airi Matsui (松井 愛莉)	December 26, 1996 (age 29)	Fukushima	
March 25, 2012	Ayaka Miyoshi (三吉 彩花)	June 18, 1996 (age 30)	Saitama	
March 31, 2013	Suzuka Nakamoto (中元 すず香)	December 20, 1997 (age 28)	Hiroshima	Second student council president (2012); Past member of Karen Girl's
March 31, 2013	Mariri Sugimoto (杉本 愛莉鈴)	August 4, 2000 (age 26)	Hiroshima	Left group at end of elementary school rather than junior high
March 30, 2014	Marina Horiuchi (堀内 まり菜)	April 29, 1998 (age 28)	Tokyo	Third student council president (2013); First vice president (2012)
March 30, 2014	Raura Iida (飯田 來麗)	April 9, 1998 (age 28)	Tokyo	Performance chairman (2013)
March 30, 2014	Nene Sugisaki (杉﨑 寧々)	May 8, 1998 (age 28)	Ibaraki	Talk chairman (2013)
March 30, 2014	Hinata Satō (佐藤 日向)	December 23, 1998 (age 27)	Kanagawa	Mood chairman (2013)
March 29, 2015	Moa Kikuchi (菊地 最愛)	July 4, 1999 (age 27)	Aichi	Fourth student council president (2014)
March 29, 2015	Yui Mizuno (水野 由結)	June 20, 1999 (age 27)	Kanagawa	Production chairman (2014)
March 29, 2015	Hana Taguchi (田口 華)	March 4, 2000 (age 26)	Nagano	Spirit ("kiai") chairman (2014)
March 29, 2015	Yunano Notsu (野津 友那乃)	December 14, 1999 (age 26)	Tokyo	Talk chairman (2014); Stage name Yunano Honjyō
March 27, 2016	Rinon Isono (磯野 莉音)	November 16, 2000 (age 25)	Kanagawa	Fifth student council president (2015)
March 27, 2016	Saki Ooga (大賀 咲希)	April 11, 2000 (age 26)	Tokyo	Education chairman (2015)
March 27, 2016	Saki Shirai (白井 沙樹)	September 28, 2000 (age 26)	Niigata	Talk chairman (2015)
March 25, 2017	Sara Kurashima (倉島 颯良)	February 24, 2002 (age 24)	Ibaraki	Sixth student council president (2016)
March 25, 2017	Mirena Kurosawa (黒澤 美澪奈)	May 22, 2001 (age 25)	Tokyo	MC chairman (2016)
March 24, 2018	Aiko Yamaide (山出 愛子)	December 1, 2002 (age 23)	Kagoshima	Seventh student council president (2017); Second vice president (2016)
March 24, 2018	Megumi Okada (岡田 愛)	April 4, 2002 (age 24)	Aichi	Talk chairman (2017)
March 24, 2018	Momoko Okazaki (岡崎 百々子)	March 3, 2003 (age 23)	Kanagawa	Perseverance ("ganbare") chairman (2017)
March 30, 2019	Maaya Asō (麻生 真彩)	November 4, 2003 (age 22)	Kanagawa	Talk chairman (2018); Education chairman (2017)
March 30, 2019	Marin Hidaka (日髙 麻鈴)	December 1, 2003 (age 22)	Kanagawa	Breakthrough ("hamidase") chairman (2018)
March 30, 2019	Yuzumi Shintani (新谷 ゆづみ)	July 20, 2003 (age 23)	Wakayama	Eighth student council president (2018)
August 30, 2020	Kano Fujihira (藤平 華乃)	August 28, 2004 (age 22)	Chiba	Ninth student council president (2019); Performance chairman (2018)
August 30, 2020	Soyoka Yoshida (吉田 爽葉香)	June 14, 2004 (age 22)	Osaka	Perseverance ("ganbare") chairman (2019); Education chairman (2018)
August 30, 2020	Tsugumi Aritomo (有友 緒心)	September 7, 2004 (age 22)	Chiba	Breakthrough ("hamidase") chairman (2019)
August 30, 2020	Momoe Mori (森 萌々穂)	December 8, 2004 (age 21)	Tokyo	Talk chairman (2019)

== Sub-units ==
The sub-units of the group were described as extra-curricular activities, each with its own theme and genre. For example, the Heavy Music Club Babymetal performed music which combined J-pop and heavy metal and wears Gothic Lolita outfits; the Go Home Club Sleepiece performed live wearing pajamas, with light choreography invoking movements during sleep; and the Science Club Kagaku Kyumei Kikoh Logica?, which members perform wearing lab coats, aimed to get people more interested in science and uses scientific terms in the lyrics.

The Heavy Music Club, performing as Babymetal, was spun off from Sakura Gakuin as a separate musical group in 2013, following the graduation of its lead singer, Suzuka Nakamoto.

Club	Sub-unit name	Members by nendo	
Baton Club (バトン部, Baton-bu)	Twinklestars	2010–2011	Ayami, Raura, Marina, Nene, Hinata, Yui, Moa
Baton Club (バトン部, Baton-bu)	Twinklestars	2014	Yui, Moa, Yunano, Sara, Aiko
Heavy Music Club (重音部, Jūon-bu)	Babymetal	2010–2013 (Note: Babymetal split from the main group in 2013, and continues to perform as a separate group, but the club is defunct in that there is not currently a group of this nature performing as a sub-unit of Sakura Gakuin. After Babymetal was split off from Sakura Gakuin, Yui continued to perform with the group until 2018. After her departure, temporary "Avenger" members filled her spot in live performances until 2023 when former Sakura Gakuin member Momoko Okazaki became a permanent member.)	Suzuka (leader), Yui, Moa
Cooking Club (クッキング部, Kukkingu-bu)	Mini-Pati (ミニパティ)	2010	Raura (pink), Marina (yellow), Nene (green)
Cooking Club (クッキング部, Kukkingu-bu)	Mini-Pati (ミニパティ)	2011–2014	Hana (pink), Yui (yellow), Moa (green)
Cooking Club (クッキング部, Kukkingu-bu)	Mini-Pati (ミニパティ)	2015–2017	Aiko (pink), Momoko (yellow), Marin (green)
Go Home Club (帰宅部, Kitaku-bu)	Sleepiece	2010–2013	Raura (pink), Marina (yellow), Nene (green)
Go Home Club (帰宅部, Kitaku-bu)	Sleepiece	2015	Maaya (pink), Saki Ooga (yellow), Mirena (green)
Go Home Club (帰宅部, Kitaku-bu)	Sleepiece	2016	Maaya (pink), Kano (yellow), Mirena (blue)
Newspaper Club (新聞部, Shinbun-bu)	Scoopers	2010–2011	Ayaka, Airi
Tennis Club (テニス部, Tenisu-bu)	Pastel Wind	2012	Nene (leader), Hana, Yunano, Marina
Tennis Club (テニス部, Tenisu-bu)	Pastel Wind	2013	Nene (leader), Hana, Yunano, Saki Ooga
Science Club (科学部, Kagaku-bu)	Kagaku Kyumei Kikoh Logica? (科学究明機構ロヂカ？) (Note: English name is "Science Investigation Mechanism Logica?". Name provided in table is Romanization used in official sources. Hepburn romanization is "Kagaku Kyūmei Kikō Rojika?")	2012–2013 ("Ver. 1.0")	Marina (leader), Hinata, Rinon
Science Club (科学部, Kagaku-bu)	Kagaku Kyumei Kikoh Logica? (科学究明機構ロヂカ？)	2015 ("Ver 1.2")	Rinon (leader), Sara, Megumi
Science Club (科学部, Kagaku-bu)	Kagaku Kyumei Kikoh Logica? (科学究明機構ロヂカ？)	2016 ("Ver 2.0")	Sara (leader), Megumi, Momoko
Pro-wrestling Fan Club (プロレス同好会, Puroresu dōkō-kai)	Pro-Wrestling Circle	2014	Hana, Rinon
Purchasing Club (購買部, Kōbai-bu)	Kōbaibu	2014	Yunano, Saki Shirai
Purchasing Club (購買部, Kōbai-bu)	Kōbaibu	2015	Saki Shirai, Soyoka
Purchasing Club (購買部, Kōbai-bu)	Kōbaibu	2016–2019	Soyoka, Tsugumi
Art Club (美術部, Bijutsu-bu)	Art Performance Unit Trico Dolls (Note: Stylized in lowercase as Art Performance Unit trico dolls.)	2018	Momoe (leader), Yuzumi, Yume

=== Unofficial lineups ===
There were multiple times that sub-units would perform with unofficial lineups, or that unofficial sub-units would perform at group events. These times are listed below.

Date	Sub-unit	Song	Lineup	Reason
March 24, 2012	Babymetal	Doki Doki Morning	Marina (leading), Ayaka, Airi	Shuffle portion of concert
March 24, 2012	Sleepiece	Medaka no Kyōdai	Moa, Yui, Rinon	Shuffle portion of concert
March 24, 2012	Mini-Pati	Princess a la Mode	Ayami, Suzuka, Hinata	Shuffle portion of concert
March 24, 2012	Scoopers	Brand New Day	Raura, Nene, Hana	Shuffle portion of concert
October 26–27, 2012	Scoopers	Brand New Day	Mariri, Saki Ooga	Sakura Gakuin Festival 2012
December 8, 2013	Twinklestars	Dear Mr. Socrates	Marina, Raura, Nene, Hinata, Moa, Yui, Yunano	3rd Anniversary Concert
December 8, 2013	Babymetal	Doki Doki Morning	Hana (leading), Saki Ooga, Aiko	3rd Anniversary Concert
December 8, 2013	Sleepiece	Medaka no Kyōdai	Hinata, Moa, Yui	3rd Anniversary Concert
December 8, 2013	M&M (Note: Unofficial sub-unit.)	Interstellar Fight	Marina, Moa	3rd Anniversary Concert
December 8, 2013	M&M	Hana o Pun	Marina, Moa	3rd Anniversary Concert
December 8, 2013	Funky Sakura Babys	Runway Beat	Raura, Yui, Rinon	3rd Anniversary Concert
December 7, 2014	Scoopers	Brand New Day	Yui, Rinon	2014 Shuffle Night
December 7, 2014	sleepiece	Suimin Busoku	Yunano, Saki Ooga, Saki Shirai	2014 Shuffle Night
December 7, 2014	Pastel Wind	Yosōijō no Smash	Moa, Yui, Rinon, Aiko	2014 Shuffle Night
December 7, 2014	Kagaku Kyumei Kikoh Logica?	Science Girl, Silence Boy	Hana, Yunano, Sara	2014 Shuffle Night
December 7, 2014	Black Babymetal (Note: Black Babymetal was never an official sub-unit of Sakura Gakuin; rather, a sub-unit that came about after Babymetal was split from the main group. The sub-unit in Babymetal consisted of Moa and Yui.)	Onedari Daisakusen (Note: Song released by Babymetal after they split from Sakura Gakuin.)	Aiko, Megumi	2014 Shuffle Night
October 9, 2017	Pastel Wind	Scoreboard ni Love ga Aru	Maaya, Aiko, Tsugumi, Momoe (Note: The original lineup of this shuffle unit is theorized to have included Miki and Miku instead of Maaya and Aiko, but Miki and Miku were ill for this show.)	2017 After School Anthology/Shuffle Night
October 9, 2017	Scoopers	Brand New Day	Megumi, Momoko	2017 After School Anthology/Shuffle Night
October 9, 2017	Kagaku Kyumei Kikoh Logica?	Welcome to My Computer	Aiko, Marin, Yuzumi	2017 After School Anthology/Shuffle Night
October 9, 2017	Babymetal	Gimme Chocolate!!	Maaya, Marin, Kano (Note: The original lineup of this shuffle unit is theorized to have included Soyoka instead of Marin, but Soyoka was ill for this show.)	2017 After School Anthology/Shuffle Night
March 30, 2019	Sleepiece	Suimin Busoku/Medaka no Kyōdai (mashup)	Maaya, Marin, Kano	2018 Road to Graduation Final graduation of Maaya, who was part of sleepiece from 2015-2016)
October 19–20, 2019	@onefive	Pinky Promise	Kano, Soyoka, Tsugumi, Momoe	2019 Sakura Gakuin Festival, launch of @onefive
July 31, 2020	Trico Dolls	C'est la Vie	Kokona, Neo, Yume	2020 Hōkago Anthology
July 31, 2020	Pro-Wrestling Circle	Spin in the Wind	Miki, Miko	2020 Hōkago Anthology
Multiple dates 2020–2021	Kōbaibu	Akindo Soul	Miki, Neo	Kōbaibu was used to introduce merchandise sales, but was not an official sub-unit in this era.

== Discography ==
- Sakura Gakuin 2010 Nendo: Message (2011)
- Sakura Gakuin 2011 Nendo: Friends (2012)
- Sakura Gakuin 2012 Nendo: My Generation (2013)
- Sakura Gakuin 2013 Nendo: Kizuna (2014)
- Sakura Gakuin 2014 Nendo: Kimi ni Todoke (2015)
- Sakura Gakuin 2015 Nendo: Kirameki no Kakera (2016)
- Sakura Gakuin 2016 Nendo: Yakusoku (2017)
- Sakura Gakuin 2017 Nendo: My Road (2018)
- Sakura Gakuin 2018 Nendo: Life Iro Asenai Hibi (2019)
- Sakura Gakuin 2019 Nendo: Story (2020)
- Sakura Gakuin 2020 Nendo: Thank You (2021)
