= Mirena Kurosawa =

Japanese tarento and idol (born 2001)

- 黒澤 美澪奈
- Born: May 22, 2001 (age 24); Tokyo, Japan
- Other name: Mirena
- Occupations: Tarento, idol
- Years active: 2009–present
- Height: 1.5 m (4 ft 11 in)

Mirena Kurosawa (黒澤 美澪奈, Kurosawa Mirena; born May 22, 2001, in Tokyo, Japan) is a Japanese tarento and idol who was formerly a member of Sakura Gakuin. On March 31, 2019, she ended her contract with Amuse Inc.

== Biography ==
Kurosawa lived in Aichi Prefecture from two to seven years old. In 2009, she won the Ciao Girl 2009 Audition and debuted as a child actress. From April 2, 2012 to March 27, 2014, Kurosawa appeared in Dai! Tensai Terebi-kun as a "Terebi Senshi". On May 6, 2015, she became a member of Sakura Gakuin.

== Filmography ==
=== Films ===
Year	Title	Notes
2011	Kochira Katsushika-ku Kameari Kōen-mae Hashutsujo	
2015	Detective Conan: Sunflowers of Inferno	

=== Dramas ===
Year	Title	Role	Network	Notes
2011	Mōhitotsu no Kyōgū	Yumi (child)	ABC	Episode 6

=== Variety series ===
Year	Title	Network	Notes
2012	Dai! Tensai Terebi-kun	NHK E	

=== Other series ===
Year	Title	Network	Notes
2010	N St	TBS	As "Mirena-chan"

=== Advertisements ===
Year	Title	Notes
2009	Tokyu Dentetsu Group Kigyō	
2010	Tokyu Corporation	
2011	McDonald's Happy Set Pokémon "Pokemon Calendar"	
2011	McDonald's Happy Set Lil Pri "Seal de Hime Chen"	
2011	Suzuki Palette "Kazoku no Kisetsu Ryūsei"	
2011	NTT DoCoMo "Saigaiyōdengonban"	
2011	ABC-Mart	
2012	Ciao	
2015	Pilot Ink Maikode Katyusha	

== Bibliography ==
=== Magazines ===
Title	Notes
Shōgaku Shi-nensei	Model
Shōgaku San-nensei	Model
Ciao	Model
