= Kokona Nonaka =

Japanese voice actress

- 野中 ここな
- Born: 28 January 2006 (age 20); Nagasaki Prefecture, Japan
- Occupations: Singer; voice actress
- Years active: 2018–present
- Employer: Amuse Inc.
- Notable work: Onipan! as Tsuyukusa; Love Live! Hasunosora Girls' High School Idol Club as Sayaka Murano
- Musical career
- Genre: J-pop
- Instrument: Voice
- Member of: Sakura Gakuin; Hasunosora Girls' High School Idol Club

Kokona Nonaka (Japanese: 野中 ここな, Hepburn: Nonaka Kokona; born 28 January 2006) is a Japanese singer and voice actress from Nagasaki Prefecture, affiliated with Amuse Creative Studio. She was a member of the idol group Sakura Gakuin from 2018 until their dissolution in 2021. She has also starred as Tsuyukusa in Onipan! and Sayaka Murano in Love Live! Hasunosora Girls' High School Idol Club.

== Biography ==
Kokona Nonaka was born on 28 January 2006 in Nagasaki Prefecture and raised there. She is the eldest of four siblings. In 2017, she passed the Amuse All-Prefecture All-Applicant Interview Audition 2017 (Kyushu and Okinawa Edition) and joined Amuse Inc..

On 6 May 2018, Nonaka joined Sakura Gakuin at the Sakura Gakuin 2018 Transfer Ceremony held at Nakano Zero Grand Hall. On 14 September 2020, she was appointed as Sakura Gakuin's 10th student council president during their variety show Sakura Gakuin no Ganbare!! Fresh! Monday. She graduated from Sakura Gakuin on 29 August 2021 when the group dissolved.

In February 2022, Nonaka was cast as Tsuyukusa in Onipan!, which premiered on the children variety show Oha Suta in April 2022. She was part of the Onipans! unit who performed the anime's theme song "Oni Papa Pan! Pan!". In June 2023, she made her radio solo debut with Nonaka Kokona no REC-chū! (野中ここなのREC中！) on Niconico Channel+.

In February 2023, it was announced that Nonaka would star as Sayaka Murano in the Love Live! Hasunosora Girls' High School Idol Club sub-franchise, including the game Link! Like! Love Live!. She is a member of the unit Dollchestra, who have had seven of its releases reach the Oricon Singles Chart Top 20. She reprised her role as Sayaka in the sub-franchise's Bloom: Garden Party film.

On 15 January 2026, Nonaka's first photobook, Utakata (うたかた), was released by Kadokawa Corporation. Featuring diverse images such as school uniforms, swimsuits, and mature-looking appearances, it was shot throughout her native Nagasaki Prefecture, including in such places as a horse ranch and dagashiya; Takanori Yamauchi of Real Sound stated that this "captur[es] her authentic self as she spends her final days as a teenager".

Nonaka's special skill is video editing.

== Discography ==
=== Animated television ===
Year	Title	Role	Ref.
2022	Onipan!	Tsuyukusa	

=== Animated film ===
Year	Title	Role	Ref.
2025	Love Live! Hasunosora Girls' High School Idol Club Bloom: Garden Party	Sayaka Murano	

=== Video games ===
Year	Title	Role	Ref.
2023	Link! Like! Love Live!	Sayaka Murano	
2024	Monster Strike	Odysseia	
