= Karen Girl's =

Japanese girl group

Karen Girl's 可憐Girl's
- Origin: Japan
- Genres: J-pop, pop
- Years active: 2008–2009
- Labels: Geneon Universal
- Members: Ayami; Yuika; Suzuka
- Website: www.amuse.co.jp/artist/karen_girls

Karen Girl's (可憐Girl's, Karen Gāruzu) was a Japanese three-member girl group formed in 2008 by the Amuse talent agency. The group performed songs for the anime Zettai Karen Children for the duration of the show.

== History ==
Karen Girl's was formed from elementary school children as a result of an audition. It was represented by the Amuse talent agency, and released its records on the Geneon Universal Entertainment Japan record label. The group was introduced as "a little sister" to the girl trio Perfume. Karen Girl's sang several theme songs for the anime Zettai Karen Children, and became inactive after the series ended. In 2010, Ayami and Suzuka became founding members of Sakura Gakuin, an idol group formed by the same agency. Yuika became a member of the idol group Maboroshi Love.

== Legacy ==
Suzuka became a founding member of the metal idol band Babymetal, taking the stage name Su-metal. With her new band, she performed a cover of the band's debut single "Over the Future", rearranged as a heavy metal cover subtitled "Rising Force ver.", (Note: A reference to Yngwie Malmsteen's song and album of the same name.) at the show Legend "D" Su-metal Seitansai at Akasaka Blitz on 20 December 2012, the same day as her fifteenth birthday.

== Members ==
Name	Birth name	Date of birth	Prefecture of origin
Ayami	Ayami Mutō (武藤 彩未)	29 April 1996 (age 28)	Ibaraki
Yuika	Yuika Shima (島 ゆいか)	20 September 1996 (age 28)	Kumamoto
Suzuka	Suzuka Nakamoto (中元 すず香)	20 December 1997 (age 27)	Hiroshima

== Discography ==
=== Studio albums ===
Title	Release date	JP (Oricon)	Label
Fly to the Future	25 February 2009	19	Geneon

=== Singles ===
Title	Release date	JP (Oricon)	Label
"Over the Future"	25 June 2008	17	Geneon
"My Wings"	26 November 2008	26	Geneon
