= Suzuka Nakamoto =

Japanese musician (born 1997)

Suzuka Nakamoto 中元 すず香
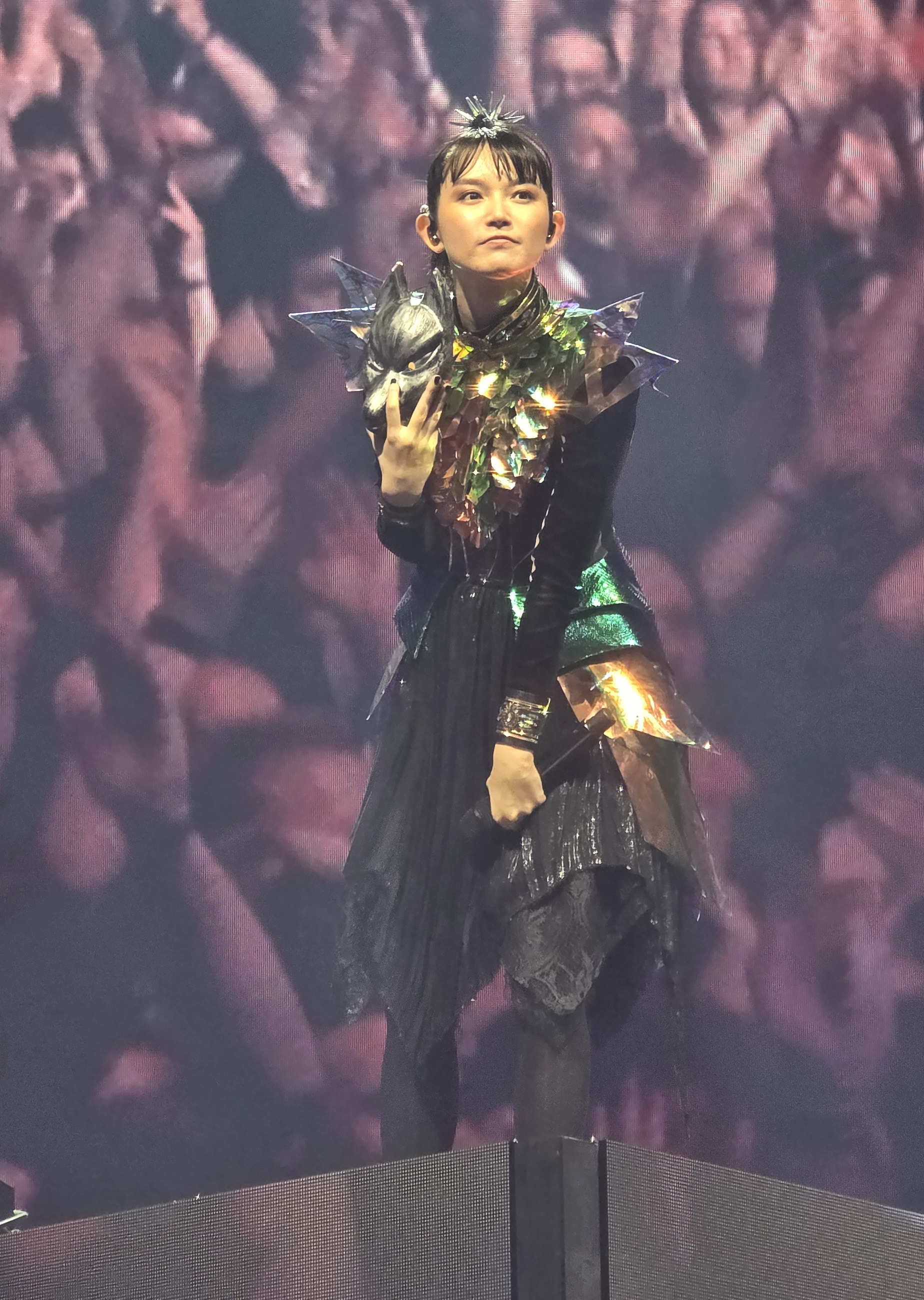
- Nakamoto performing in May 2025

Background information
- Also known as: Su-metal
- Born: December 20, 1997 (age 28); Hiroshima, Japan
- Genres: Kawaii metal; heavy metal; J-pop; power metal; alternative metal
- Occupations: Singer
- Instrument: Vocals
- Years active: 2007–present
- Label: Amuse Inc.
- Member of: Babymetal
- Formerly of: Karen Girl's; Sakura Gakuin

Suzuka Nakamoto (Japanese: 中元 すず香, Hepburn: Nakamoto Suzuka;; born December 20, 1997), better known by her stage name Su-metal, is a Japanese singer. She is best known as a member of the kawaii metal band Babymetal and was formerly a member of the idol groups Karen Girl's and Sakura Gakuin. She is represented by the talent agency Amuse Inc.

== Early life ==
Nakamoto was born in Hiroshima on December 20, 1997. Her mother works with gemstones and her father formerly played in a rock band called Hooligans. She has two older sisters, one of whom is mental health counselor and former Nogizaka46 member Himeka Nakamoto; the two studied together at the Actor's School Hiroshima and sang together in a duo called Tween. At the age of five, Nakamoto won the 2002 Grand Prix in the Image Girl contest for Bandai's toy cosmetics line Jewel Drop, and subsequently starred in several Jewel Drop commercials.

== Career ==
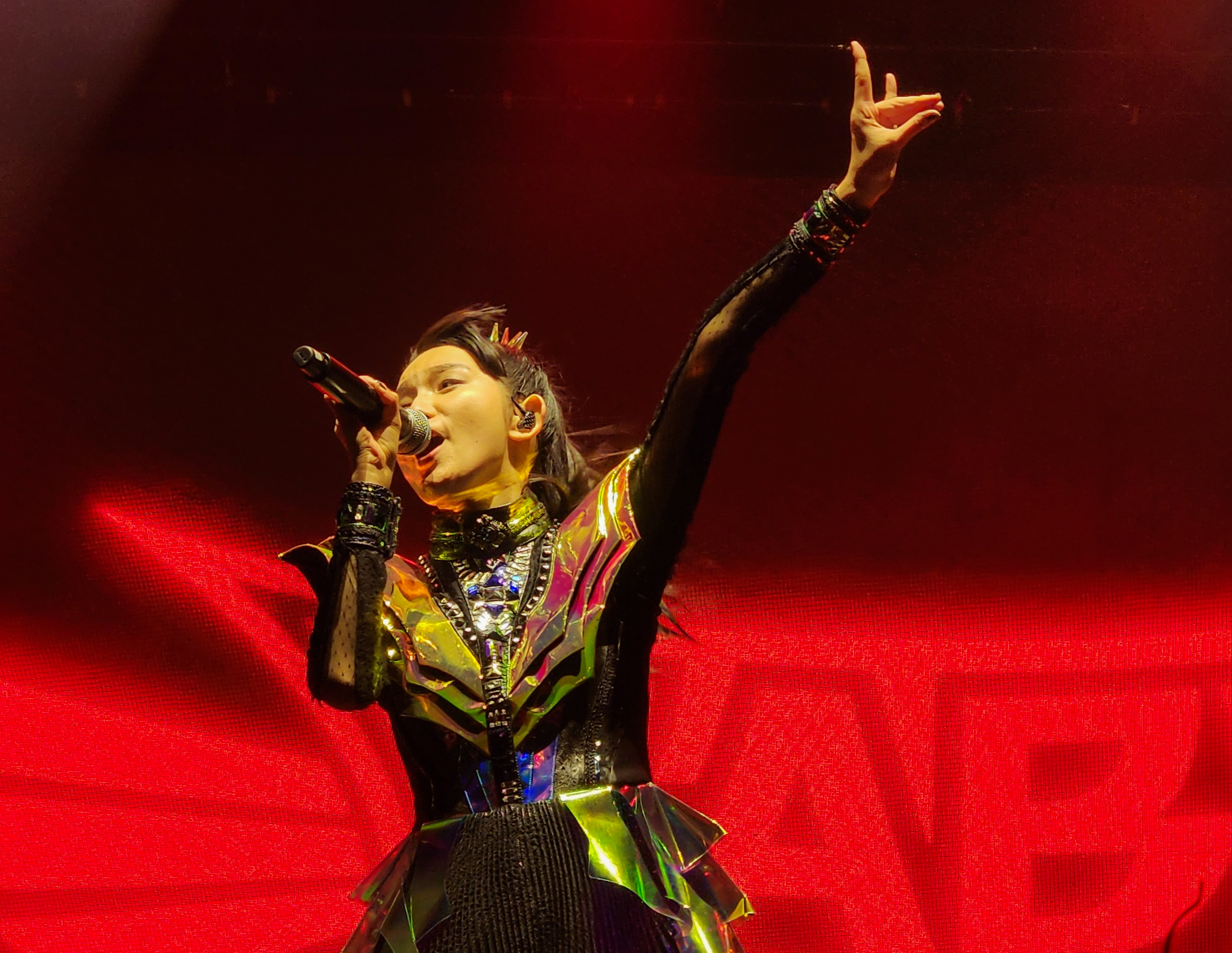
Nakamoto performing in Toronto in 2023

In 2006, Nakamoto was accepted into Actor's School Hiroshima. She studied with another future Sakura Gakuin member, Mariri Sugimoto, with whom she had been acquainted before attending the school. She also had a rivalry with Riho Sayashi, a future Morning Musume member who would later become a temporary backup dancer for Babymetal, as they were considered the school's top two students at the time.

In 2007, Nakamoto was signed to the talent agency Amuse Inc. after being a runner-up in the company's second Star Kids Audition. In 2008, the agency formed a trio called Karen Girl's that included Nakamoto. The group was introduced as a "little sister" of the girl trio Perfume and sang several theme songs for the anime Zettai Karen Children, disbanding in March 2009 after the anime ended its run. Later that month, Nakamoto was cast in a musical stage adaptation of the 1972 Japanese novel The Adventurers: Gamba and His Fifteen Companions (冒険者たち ガンバと15ひきの仲間, Bōkenshatachi: Ganba to 15-hiki no Nakama) by Atsuo Saitō. The Adventurers was performed again in June 2010, with Nakamoto playing the role of Shioji.

In April 2010, Nakamoto became an original member of Sakura Gakuin, Amuse's school-themed idol group which limited the age of its members to the Japanese compulsory education range. The members also formed sub-units, each of which was themed around a school club and released its own songs as a unit. Nakamoto became the lead vocalist of the "Heavy Music Club" (重音部, Jūonbu), founded by producer Kobametal, which eventually released songs under the name Babymetal. Nakamoto assumed the stage name Su-metal and was joined by fellow Sakura Gakuin members Yui Mizuno (Yuimetal) and Moa Kikuchi (Moametal) as dancers and backing vocalists, as well as Momoko Okazaki (Momometal) from 2023 onwards following Mizuno's departure in 2018.

In 2013, Nakamoto graduated from school and therefore "graduated" from Sakura Gakuin, with her graduation held at the Tokyo International Forum on March 31. Babymetal was expected to disband following Nakamoto's graduation as other Sakura Gakuin sub-groups had done, but the group had become successful both domestically and overseas with the viral popularity of their music videos, and they instead continued as an independent band. They have since undertaken multiple world tours and released the studio albums Babymetal (2014), Metal Resistance (2016), Metal Galaxy (2019), The Other One (2023), and Metal Forth (2025).

In 2018, Nakamoto was placed at No. 9 on the Oricon list of Rankings for Anticipation of New Adults, which praised her "overwhelming singing ability". In 2022, she received a songwriting credit for the first time as a lyricist on a Babymetal song with "Divine Attack (Shingeki)". In 2025, she received credit as the sole lyricist of a Babymetal song with "White Flame".

== Personal life ==
Nakamoto tends to compare songs to colors. She is a fan of the metal band Sabaton.

== Associated acts ==
- Karen Girl's (2008–2009)
- Sakura Gakuin (2010–2013)
- Babymetal (2010–present)

== Discography ==
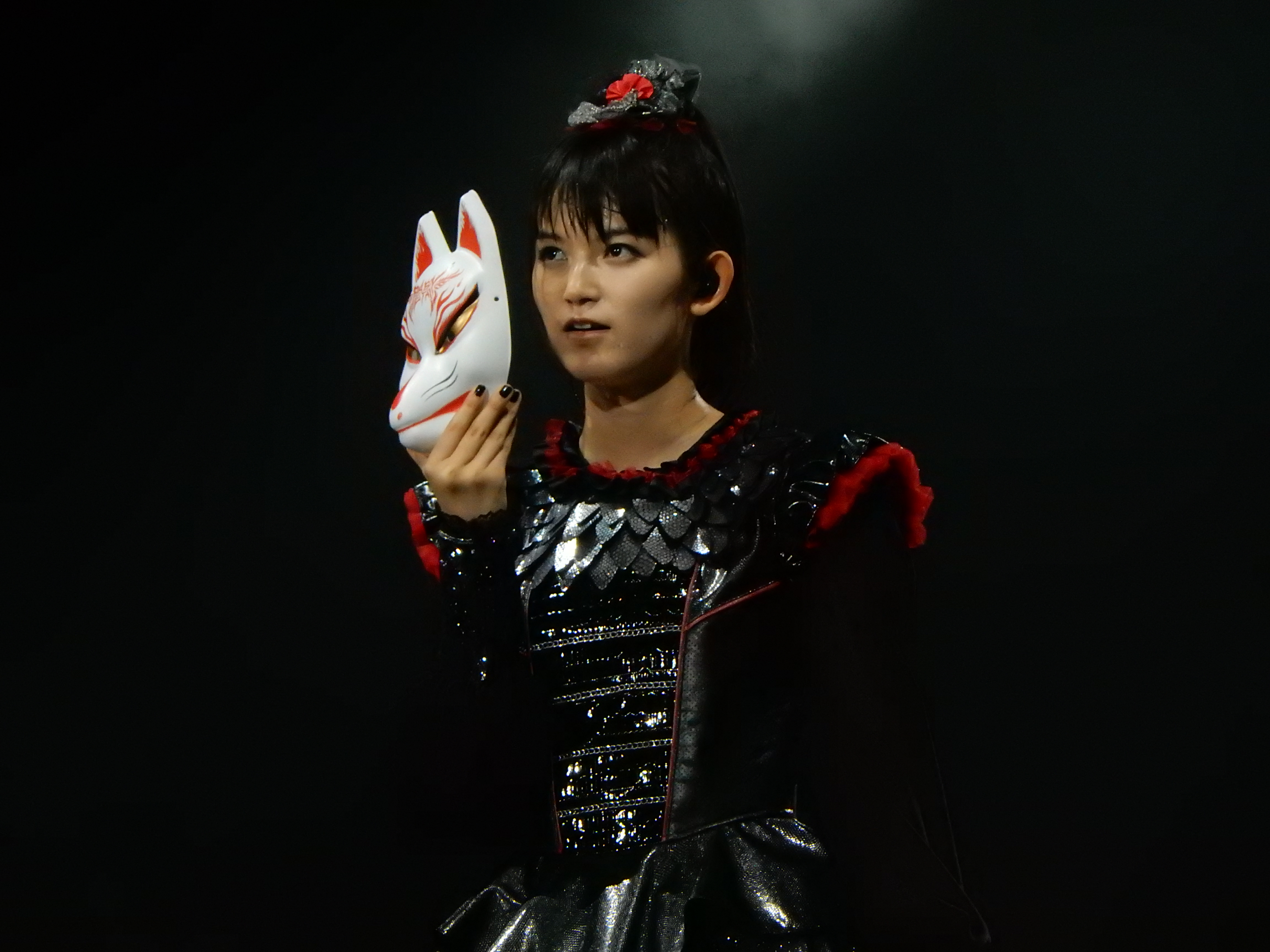
Nakamoto performing at The O2 Arena in London, 2016

=== With Karen Girl's ===
- Fly to the Future (2009)

=== With Sakura Gakuin ===
- Sakura Gakuin 2010 Nendo: Message (2011)
- Sakura Gakuin 2011 Nendo: Friends (2012)
- Sakura Gakuin 2012 Nendo: My Generation (2013)

=== With Babymetal ===
- Babymetal (2014)
- Metal Resistance (2016)
- Metal Galaxy (2019)
- The Other One (2023)
- Metal Forth (2025)

== Filmography ==
=== Anime ===
- Zettai Karen Children (2009), cameo as herself with Karen Girl's – episode 40

=== Film ===
- Heavier Trip (2024), Su-metal

=== Commercial ===
- Oshii! Hiroshima (2012)

== Theater ==
- The Adventurers (冒険者たち, Bōkenshatachi) (2009)
- The Adventurers (冒険者たち, Bōkenshatachi) (2010), Shioji
