= Ayami Mutō =

Japanese idol, singer, and model (born 1996)

Ayami Mutō 武藤 彩未
- Also known as: Ayami (in Karen Girl's)
- Born: April 29, 1996 (age 29); Tokyo, Japan
- Origin: Ibaraki Prefecture
- Genres: J-pop
- Occupations: Singer; actress; model
- Instrument: Vocals
- Years active: 2004–2015, 2018–present
- Labels: Geneon Entertainment; Toy's Factory; Universal Music Japan; A-Sketch; Shinkai

Ayami Mutō (武藤 彩未, Mutō Ayami; born April 29, 1996) is a Japanese idol, singer, and model. She was represented by Amuse Inc. from 2004 to 2015, and has been a member of three musical groups formed by the company: Karen Girl's, Sakura Gakuin, and its first sub-unit Twinklestars.

== Biography ==
Mutō was born in a hospital in Ikebukuro, Toshima, Tokyo, on April 29, 1996. Her father, Yoshinori Mutō is a horse trainer, and her younger brother Miyabi Mutō is a horse jockey.

Joining the talent agency Amuse Inc. in 2004, Mutō began her career as a child model for the magazine Kids Style. In 2008, she joined the idol group Karen Girl's alongside Suzuka Nakamoto and Yuika Shima. The trio was active for one year.

In 2010, Mutō and Nakamoto joined idol group Sakura Gakuin, as one of the founding members, and as the Student Council President in the school theme of the group. Later that year, Mutō joined the group's first sub-unit Twinklestars, which acts as a school baton-twirling club. On March 25, 2012, she graduated from Sakura Gakuin.

In April 2013, Mutō began a solo project, releasing her first cover double EP, DNA1980, in July, coinciding with a series of headlining shows. In 2014, she returned to the stage to begin a solo career in major, releasing her first studio album, Eien to Shunkan, in April.

On December 16, 2015, Mutō announced on her Twitter and her profile page on Amuse that she would be going on hiatus. She continued to periodically release song covers on her personal YouTube channel.

On October 25, 2018, Mutō announced on Twitter that she will be returning to performing live on December 1, 2018.

She released her first photo book on March 12, 2024, titled The First and The Last (最初で最後, Saisho de Saigo), to commemorate 10 years since her solo debut.

On January 29, 2025, Mutō announced her marriage and pregnancy, and that she would be going on a temporary hiatus on April 29. On August 1, 2025, Muto announced the birth of her first child.

== Discography ==
=== Studio albums ===
Title	Details	Oricon
Eien to Shunkan (永遠と瞬間; "Eternity and a Moment")	Released: April 23, 2014; Label: A-Sketch, Shinkai; Formats: CD, CD+DVD, digital download; Track listing: 1. Sora (宙); 2. Jikan to iu Wonderland (時間というWonderland); 3. Irodori no Natsu (彩りの夏); 4. Sakura Romance (桜 ロマンス); 5. Tōmei Shōjo (とうめいしょうじょ); 6. A.Y.M.; 7. Megami no Suggestion (女神のサジェスチョン); 8. Eien to Shunkan (永遠と瞬間); 9. Seventeen (セブンティーン) (Seventeen edition bonus track)	16
I-Pop	Released : February 25, 2015; Label: A-Sketch, Shinkai; Formats: CD, CD+DVD, digital download; Track listing: 1. Parallel World (パラレルワールド); 2. Daydreamin'; 3. Doki Doki; 4. MiraCreation (ミラクリエイション); 5. Kaze no Shippo (風のしっぽ); 6. Kōshinkyoku Daiichiban Henrochōchō (交信曲第1番変ロ長調); 7. Mirai e no Sign (未来へのSign); 8. Owari wa Hajimari	40
Memorial Hotel	Released: December 10, 2024; Label: Tsubasa; Track listing: 1. Surfside Memory (サーフサイド・メモリー); 2. Season; 3. Calling; 4. Fuyu no Pleasure Piece (冬のプレジャーピース); 5. Rouge (ルージュ); 6. Eternal Love; 7. Hoshikuzu Diamond (星屑ダイヤモンド); 8. Steal Heart Run; 9. Anata ga Kureta Kyō no Hi (あなたがくれた今日の日); 10. Jōnetsu no Pathos (情熱のパトス)	43

=== Live albums ===
Title	Details	Oricon
Re:Birth – 19th Birthday Live at Shibuya Public Hall (Re:BIRTH～19th Birthday Live at 渋谷公会堂)	Released: October 28, 2015; Label: A-Sketch; Formats: CD, CD+DVD, digital download	–

=== EPs ===
Title	Details	Oricon
DNA1980 Vol. 1 and DNA1980 Vol. 2 (Double EP)	Released: July 19, 2013; Label: A-Sketch, Shinkai; Formats: CD, digital download; Track listing Vol. 1: 1. Suteki na Lovely Boy (素敵なラブリーボーイ); 2. Cherry Blossom (チェリーブラッサム); 3. Ribbon (リ・ボ・ン); 4. Kanashimi yo Konnichiwa (悲しみよこんにちは); Vol. 2: 1. Smile For Me (スマイル・フォー・ミー); 2. Aoi Sangoshō (青い珊瑚礁); 3. Namida no Paper Moon (涙のペーパームーン); 4. Cécile (セシル)	–
Mirrors	Released: March 4, 2020; Label: Tsubasa; Formats: CD, digital download; Track listing: 1. Amane (雨音); 2. Aitai ga Ienai (会いたいが言えない); 3. Online; 4. Tsubaki; 5. Wakenai (ワケナイ); 6. Kazabana (風花)	–
Ano Koro, Kimi ni Watashita Playlist o Imademo Boku wa Kuchizusamu (あの頃、君に渡したプレイリストを今でも僕はくちずさむ; "I Still Sing Along to That Playlist I Handed to You That Time")	Released: November 25, 2020; Label: Tsubasa; Track listing: 1. Flower; 2. Betty (ベティ); 3. Oshan; 4. Milk Coffee (ミルクコーヒー); 5. Sentimental Sky (センチメンタルスカイ); 6. Marmalade (マーマレード)	–
Shower	Released: September 15, 2021; Label: Tsubasa; Track listing: 1. Yume Michau Yo (夢みちゃうよ); 2. Headphone Communication (ヘッドホンコミュニケーション); 3. Ano Natsu no Umi De (あの夏の海で); 4. Shower; 5. Goodbye (グッバイ。); 6. Motto Wagamama ni Natte Misetanara (もっとわがままになってみせたなら)	–
Glitter Beat	Released: November 16, 2022; Label: Tsubasa; Track listing: 1. Yakusoku no Ruby (約束のルビー); 2. Handsome Lady (ハンサムレディ); 3. Flash Back; 4. Shuyaku wa Yuzurenai (主役はゆずれない); 5. Anata ni Muchū (アナタに夢中); 6. Again Again	47

=== Singles ===
- "Amane" (雨音) – released December 21, 2019
- "RF" – released April 29, 2020
- "Marmalade" (マーマレード) – released September 2, 2020
- Special Program ("Marmalade" acoustic version / "Tsubaki" acoustic version) – released January 30, 2021
- "Kon'ya no Kiss de Wasurete Hoshii No" (今夜のキスで忘れてほしいの) – released April 29, 2021
- Image Board ("Favorite" / "Holic") – released April 29, 2022
- "Game Start" – released April 29, 2023
- "Dang Dang Ki ni Naru" (DANG DANG 気になる) – released July 26, 2023
- "Fuyu no Pleasure Piece" (冬のプレジャーピース) – released December 1, 2023
- "Eternal Love" – released February 14, 2024
- "Calling" – released June 10, 2024
- "Hoshikuzu Diamond" (星屑ダイヤモンド) – released August 10, 2024
- "Anata ga Kureta Kyō no Hi" (あなたがくれた今日の日) – released October 10, 2024

== Videography ==
=== Video albums ===
Title	Details	Oricon
A.Y.M. Live Collection 2014: Henka (A.Y.M. Live Collection 2014 ～変化～; "Change")	Released: November 26, 2014; Label: A-Sketch; Formats: DVD	68
A.Y.M. Live Collection 2014: Shinka (A.Y.M. Live Collection 2014 ～進化～; "Evolution")	Released : December 17, 2014; Label: A-Sketch; Formats: DVD	105

== Filmography ==
=== Music videos ===
Title	Year	Artist	Director(s)	Ref.
"Mai Sakura"	2011	Shikuramen	Satoshi Kamiguchi	
"Sora"	2014	Ayami Mutō	Kōsai Sekine	
"Parallel World"	2015	Ayami Mutō	Unknown	
"Amane"	2019	Ayami Mutō	Unknown	
"Aitai ga ienai"	2020	Ayami Mutō	Unknown	
"Betty"	2020	Ayami Mutō	ento miura	
"SHOWER"	2021	Ayami Mutō	Daisuke Tomeki	
"again again"	2022	Ayami Mutō	Daisuke Tomeki	
"DANG DANG"	2023	Ayami Mutō	Unknown	
"Stardust Diamond"	2024	Ayami Mutō	shiro	
"Today Is The Day You Gave Me"	2024	Ayami Mutō	SHINO	
"Surfside Memory"	2024	Ayami Mutō	Takuro Okubo	
