= Amuse Inc. =

Japanese talent agency

- Logo used since 2026
- Native name: 株式会社アミューズ
- Romanized name: Kabushiki-gaisha Amyūzu
- Type: Public
- Traded as: TYO: 4301
- ISIN: JP3124500004
- Industry: Entertainment
- Founded: October 16, 1978; 48 years ago
- Founder: Yokichi Osato
- Headquarters: Saiko, Fujikawaguchiko, Yamanashi Prefecture, Japan
- Area served: Asia
- Key people: Yokichi Osato (chairman and CEO)
- Revenue: ▲¥50,647 million (2017)
- Operating income: ▲¥5,362 million (2017)
- Net income: ▲¥25,127 million (2017)
- Total assets: ▲¥38.261 million (2017)
- Total equity: ▲¥8.82 million (2017)
- Subsidiaries: Amuse Creative Studio; Amuse Sports Agency; Amuse Music Entertainment; Amuse Product Works; Amuse Communication Design; Amuse Digital Factory; Kulture; Tokyo Fantasy; Live Viewing Japan; Integroove Productions; The Far Eastern TV Entertainment; Chigasaki FM; Taishita Label Music (joint venture with Victor Entertainment); Kirei Inc. Amuse Group USA; Babymetal World; Amuse Shanghai; Beijing Geishin Theatrical Art Production; Amuse Hong Kong; Amuse Entertainment; Amuse Taiwan
- Website: amuse.co.jp

Amuse Inc. (Japanese: 株式会社アミューズ, Hepburn: Kabushiki-gaisha Amyūzu) is a Japanese entertainment company that provides artist management services. The artists include idols, musicians, and more.

Amuse produces TV and radio programs, commercial films, and movies. Other interests are in publication, music software, and patent agent businesses. The private Amuse Museum, located in Asakusa, Tokyo, was owned by the company. It featured ukiyo-e and textile displays.

== History ==
Logo used from 2018 to 2026

Amuse Inc. was created in 1978 when it signed with the rock band Southern All Stars. Soon after in 1981, the company created its movie production and distribution subsidiary Amuse Cinema City Inc. and produced Morning Moon Wa Sozatsu Ni (starring Shin Kishida) that same year, followed by Aiko 16 sai (1983). In 1983, Amuse signed with the actress Yasuko Tomita. The next year, the firm opened its subsidiary in the United States.

Amuse Video Inc. was created in 1990 as the video software production and sales subsidiary of the company. In 1995, Amuse established Ayers Inc. through a joint venture with Bandai, and opened its first movie theater. In 2000, Amuse opened its Korean subsidiary, Amuse Korea Inc. On 20 September 2001, Amuse was listed on the Osaka Securities Exchange. Its distributed film The Pianist won the Palme d'Or at the 2002 Cannes Film Festival.

In 2004, Amuse opened its e-commerce site, Ambra. In 2007, it established its music label Taishita in joint venture with Victor Entertainment. In 2008, the group invested in Brussels Co. Ltd., a company that develops Belgian beer bars; and also formed the A-Sketch label in joint venture with KDDI Corporation. In 2009, the group launched its subsidiary Amuse Edutainment Inc. In 2012, Amuse Singapore was created. Amuse intended to give a second life to J-pop by promoting the bands Flumpool and Weaver. In 2013, it produced and distributed the movie The Eternal Zero. In 2015, Amuse France Inc. was created.

In January 2016, Amuse established a partnership with New Japan Pro-Wrestling, a promotion in which Amuse owns shares. In the US, Amuse launched J-Creation to further develop ties between the Japanese and American entertainment industries. In October 2018, Amuse USA released the graphic novel Apocrypha: The Legend of Babymetal.

In 2022, Amuse founded Kulture Inc., aiming to create next-generation entertainment with Web3 and metaverse content, such as NFTs.

In February 2025, Amuse sold its 66% majority shares in A-Sketch to Universal Music Group's Japanese subsidiary for an undisclosed amount.

== Notable artists ==
=== Groups ===
- @onefive
  - Tsugumi Aritomo
  - Kano Fujihira
  - Momoe Mori
  - Soyoka Yoshida
- Asterism
- Babymetal
  - Moa Kikuchi
  - Suzuka Nakamoto
  - Momoko Okazaki
- Begin
- Cravity (for Japanese activities only)
- Cross Gene
  - Shin Won-ho
- Flow
- Flumpool
- Frederic
- IVE (for Japanese activities only)
- Perfume
  - Yuka Kashino
  - Ayaka Nishiwaki
  - Ayano Ōmoto
- Porno Graffitti
  - Akihito Okano
  - Haruichi Shindō
- Sakura Gakuin
- Shit Kingz
- Southern All Stars
  - Yuko Hara
  - Keisuke Kuwata
  - Kazuyuki Sekiguchi
- Team Nacs
  - Yo Oizumi
  - Shigeyuki Totsugi
  - Ken Yasuda
- The Oral Cigarettes

=== Individuals ===
- Ruito Aoyagi
- Kaori Asoh
- D-Lite (for Japanese activities only)
- Dean Fujioka
- Sakura Fujiwara
- Eri Fukatsu
- Masaharu Fukuyama
- Yuta Hiraoka
- Gen Hoshino
- Mayu Hotta
- Yuka Itaya
- Karin Isobe
- Kenta Izuka
- Fūka Izumi
- Shouma Kai
- Kento Kaku
- Kangnam (for Japanese activities only)
- Kaya Kiyohara
- Yuta Koseki
- Kaori Maeda
- Yui Makino
- Airi Matsui
- Yuya Matsushita
- Ayaka Miyoshi
- Takuya Mizoguchi
- Eri Murakawa
- Noa
- Shuhei Nomura
- Kokona Nonaka
- Ryohei Otani
- Manaki Reika
- Shogo Sakamoto
- Akane Sakanoue
- Dori Sakurada
- Hinata Satō
- Rie Takahashi
- Junko Takeuchi
- Asami Tano
- Takuya Terada
- Miyu Tomita
- Reina Triendl
- Juri Ueno
- Alissa Yagi
- Anna Yamada
- Erika Yamaguchi
- Jun Yoshinaga
- Yuriko Yoshitaka
- Ryo Yoshizawa

== Former artists ==
=== Groups ===
- One Ok Rock

=== Individuals ===
- Ryunosuke Kamiki
- Nina Makino
- Haruma Miura
- Yui Mizuno
- Riisa Naka
- Takeru Satoh
- Shota Taguchi
- Yu Takahashi
- Kimito Totani
- Seishuu Uragami
- Mafumafu
- Nagi Inoue

== See also ==
- Television in Japan
