= Babymetal discography =

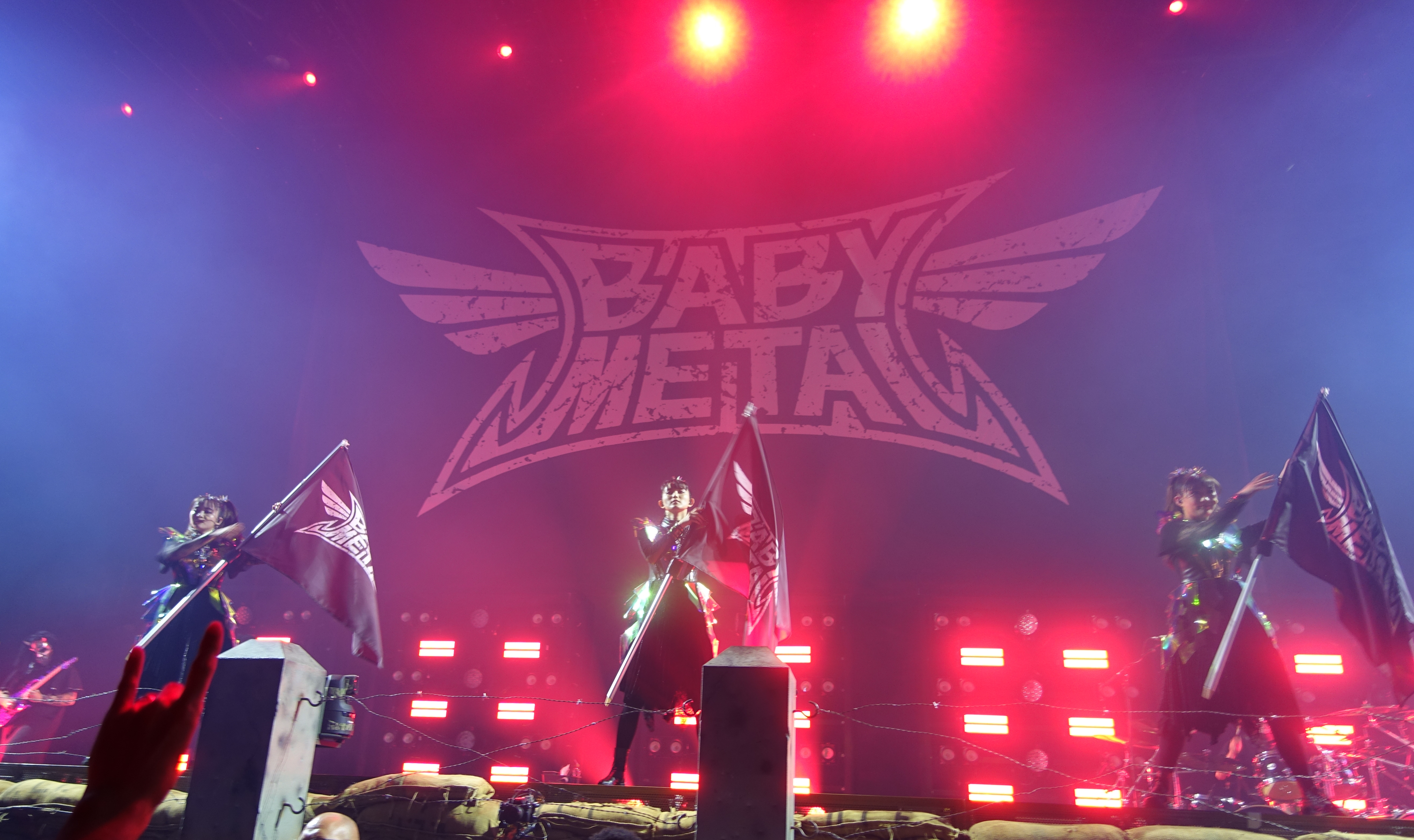
- Babymetal performing in 2023
- Studio albums: 5
- EPs: 1
- Live albums: 12
- Compilation albums: 1
- Singles: 13
- Video albums: 10
- Music videos: 19

Japanese kawaii metal band Babymetal has released five studio albums, twelve live albums, one compilation album, ten video albums, one EP, thirteen singles, and eighteen music videos. Additionally, the group has released music and footage exclusively for the band's defunct fanclub Babymetal Apocalypse and current fanclub The One. As such, these are not included in the main count and are listed separately.

The group debuted as a subunit of the Japanese idol group Sakura Gakuin, performing the track "Doki Doki Morning" on their debut album Sakura Gakuin 2010 Nendo: Message (2011), releasing several other singles through the years. Babymetal became an independent act from Sakura Gakuin in 2013. The songs released would appear on the group's eponymous debut album Babymetal in 2014. The album would chart in several countries, including on the Billboard 200 in the United States, a rare feat for Japanese artists. Babymetal later rereleased the album physically internationally in 2015, promoting the single "Road of Resistance", and has since been certified Gold in Japan.

The group's second album, Metal Resistance was released in 2016, peaking at number two on the Oricon Weekly Albums chart, certified Gold in Japan, entering the top forty on the Billboard 200, and setting a record for the highest position on the UK Albums Chart for a Japanese artist at number fifteen. In 2019, the band released their third album, Metal Galaxy, which peaked at number thirteen on the Billboard 200, becoming the highest charting Japanese language album in the chart's history. They also became the first Asian act to top the Billboard Rock Albums chart.

== Albums ==
=== Studio albums ===
List of studio albums, with selected chart positions, sales, and certifications
Title	Album details	Peak chart positions										Sales	Certifications
Title	Album details	JPN	JPN Sales	AUS	AUT	GER	NLD	UK	UK Rock	US	US World	Sales	Certifications
Babymetal	Released: 26 February 2014 (JP); Label: BMD Fox Records, Toy's Factory, Amuse, Inc.; Formats: CD, DVD, digital download, LP	4	2	—	69	95	90	103	7	187	1	JPN: 143,581 (phy.); JPN: 42,105 (dig.); UK: 14,208	RIAJ: Gold
Metal Resistance	Released: 29 March 2016 (JP); Label: BMD Fox Records, Toy's Factory, Amuse, Inc.; Formats: CD, DVD, Blu-ray (limited edition), digital download, LP	2	2	7	22	36	71	15	2	39	1	JPN: 234,305; US: 12,240	RIAJ: Gold
Metal Galaxy	Released: 8 October 2019 (JP); Label: Babymetal Records, BMD Fox Records, Toy's Factory, Amuse, Inc.; Formats: CD, DVD, digital download, LP	3	3	18	30	18	95	19	1	13	2	JPN: 96,735; US: 28,000	RIAJ: Gold
The Other One	Released: 24 March 2023; Label: Babymetal Records; Formats: CD, digital download, streaming, LP	3	3	—	—	24	—	32	3	— (Note: The Other One did not enter the US Billboard 200, but peaked at number 23 on the US Top Album Sales chart.)	8	JPN: 36,863	
Metal Forth	Released: 8 August 2025; Label: Capitol Records; Formats: CD, digital download, streaming, LP	3	3	31	7	7	29	17	2	9	1	JPN: 21,723; UK: 4,672; US: 36,000	
"—" denotes a recording that did not chart or was not released in that territory.

=== Live albums ===
List of live albums, with selected chart positions
Title	Album details	Peak chart positions				
Title	Album details	JPN	JPN Sales	UK Ind. Break.	US Heat.	US World
Live at Budokan: Red Night	Released: 7 January 2015 (JP); Label: BMD Fox Records, Toy's Factory, Amuse, Inc.; Formats: CD, digital download, LP	3	3	18	21	3
Live at Wembley	Released: 28 December 2016 (JP); Label: BMD Fox Records, Toy's Factory, Amuse, Inc.; Formats: CD, digital download, LP	5	5	—	—	—
Legend – Metal Galaxy: Day 1	Released: 9 September 2020 (JP); Label: BMD Fox Records, Toy's Factory, Amuse, Inc.; Formats: CD, digital download	9	7	—	—	—
Legend – Metal Galaxy: Day 2	Released: 9 September 2020 (JP); Label: BMD Fox Records, Toy's Factory, Amuse, Inc.; Formats: CD, digital download	10	8	—	—	—
Live: Legend I, D, Z Apocalypse	Released: 25 August 2021 (JP); Label: BMD Fox Records, Toy's Factory, Amuse, Inc.; Formats: LP	150	—	—	—	—
Live: Legend 1999 & 1997 Apocalypse	Released: 25 August 2021 (JP); Label: BMD Fox Records, Toy's Factory, Amuse, Inc.; Formats: LP	167	—	—	—	—
Live in London: Babymetal World Tour 2014	Released: 25 August 2021 (JP); Label: BMD Fox Records, Toy's Factory, Amuse, Inc.; Formats: LP	—	—	—	—	—
Live at Tokyo Dome	Released: 8 September 2021 (JP); Label: BMD Fox Records, Toy's Factory, Amuse, Inc.; Formats: LP	—	—	—	—	—
Legend S: Baptism XX	Released: 8 September 2021 (JP); Label: BMD Fox Records, Toy's Factory, Amuse, Inc.; Formats: LP	—	—	—	—	—
Live at the Forum	Released: 22 September 2021 (JP); Label: BMD Fox Records, Toy's Factory, Amuse, Inc.; Formats: LP	—	—	—	—	—
Legend – Metal Galaxy	Released: 22 September 2021 (JP); Label: BMD Fox Records, Toy's Factory, Amuse, Inc.; Formats: LP	—	—	—	—	—
10 Babymetal Budokan	Released: 29 September 2021 (JP); Label: BMD Fox Records, Toy's Factory, Amuse, Inc.; Formats: LP, CD, digital download	19	14	—	—	—
Babymetal Returns: The Other One	Released: 14 June 2023 (JP); Label: BMD Fox Records, Toy's Factory, Amuse, Inc.; Formats: LP	—	—	—	—	—
Babymetal Begins: The Other One (Clear Night)	Released: 11 October 2023 (JP); Label: BMD Fox Records, Toy's Factory, Amuse, Inc.; Formats: LP	—	49	—	—	—
Babymetal Begins: The Other One (Black Night)	Released: 11 October 2023 (JP); Label: BMD Fox Records, Toy's Factory, Amuse, Inc.; Formats: LP	—	52	—	—	—
Babymetal World Tour 2023-2024: Legend MM (20 Night)	Released: 10 July 2024 (JP); Label: BMD Fox Records, Toy's Factory, Amuse, Inc.; Formats: LP					
Babymetal World Tour 2023-2024: Legend MM (21 Night)	Released: 10 July 2024 (JP); Label: BMD Fox Records, Toy's Factory, Amuse, Inc.; Formats: LP					
Live at the O2 Arena – Highlights	Released: 18 April 2026; Label: Capitol Records; Formats: LP	—	—	—	—	21
"—" denotes a recording that did not chart or was not released in that territory.

"The One" exclusive limited releases

- Live at Budokan: Black Night (2015) — released as part of the Budo-can.
- Legend 2015: New Year Fox Festival (2015)
- Babymetal World Tour 2014 Apocalypse (2021)
- Trilogy -Metal Resistance Episode III- Apocalypse (2021)
- The Fox Festivals In Japan 2017 -The Five Fox Festival- Selection (2021)
- The Fox Festivals In Japan 2017 -Big Fox Festival- (2021)
- Metal Resistance Episode VII -Apocrypha- The Chosen Seven (2021)
- Babymetal Awakens -The Sun Also Rises- (2021)
- Babymetal Arises -Beyond The Moon- Legend -M- (2021)
- Metal Galaxy World Tour In Japan (2021)
- 10 Babymetal Legends Live Vinyl Series -The One Special Tour Boxset- (2021)

=== Compilation albums ===
List of compilation albums, with selected chart positions
Title	Album details	Peak chart positions	
Title	Album details	JPN	SCO
10 Babymetal Years	Released: 23 December 2020 (JP); Label: BMD Fox Records, Toy's Factory, Amuse, Inc.; Formats: LP, CD, CD/DVD, CD/Blu-ray, CD/Music Card, digital download	2	51

=== Video albums ===
List of video albums, with selected chart positions
Title	Album details	Peak chart positions	
Title	Album details	JPN DVD	JPN Blu-ray
Live: Legend I, D, Z Apocalypse	Released: 19 October 2013; Label: BMD Fox Records, Toy's Factory, Amuse, Inc.; Formats: DVD (limited edition), Blu-ray, digital download	—	7
Live: Legend 1999 & 1997 Apocalypse	Released: 29 October 2014; Label: BMD Fox Records, Toy's Factory, Amuse, Inc.; Formats: DVD, Blu-ray	8	4
Live at Budokan: Red Night & Black Night Apocalypse	Release: 7 January 2015 (JP); Label: BMD Fox Records, Toy's Factory, Amuse, Inc.; Formats: DVD, Blu-ray, digital download	3	1
Live in London: Babymetal World Tour 2014	Release: 20 May 2015 (JP); Label: BMD Fox Records, Toy's Factory, Amuse, Inc.; Formats: DVD, Blu-ray	3	1
Live at Wembley	Released: 23 November 2016; Label: BMD Fox Records, Toy's Factory, Amuse, Inc.; Formats: DVD, Blu-ray, digital download	1	2
Live at Tokyo Dome	Released: 12 April 2017; Label: BMD Fox Records, Toy's Factory, Amuse, Inc.; Formats: DVD, Blu-ray, digital download	3	1
Legend S: Baptism XX	Released: 1 August 2018; Label: BMD Fox Records, Toy's Factory, Amuse, Inc.; Formats: DVD, Blu-ray, digital download	4	1
Live at the Forum	Released: 13 May 2020; Label: BMD Fox Records, Toy's Factory, Amuse, Inc.; Formats: DVD, Blu-ray	3	3
Legend – Metal Galaxy	Released: 9 September 2020; Label: BMD Fox Records, Toy's Factory, Amuse, Inc.; Formats: DVD, Blu-ray	2	3
10 Babymetal Budokan	Released: 29 September 2021; Label: BMD Fox Records, Toy's Factory, Amuse, Inc.; Formats: DVD, Blu-ray	2	2
Babymetal Returns: The Other One	Released: 14 June 2023; Label: BMD Fox Records, Toy's Factory, Amuse, Inc.; Formats: DVD, Blu-ray	7	3
Babymetal Begins: The Other One	Released: 11 October 2023; Label: BMD Fox Records, Toy's Factory, Amuse, Inc.; Formats: DVD, Blu-ray	4	2
Babymetal World Tour 2023-2024: Legend MM	Released: 10 July 2024; Label: BMD Fox Records, Toy's Factory, Amuse, Inc.; Formats: DVD, Blu-ray	1	1
Babymetal Arises: Beyond the Moon – Legend M	Released: 10 July 2024; Label: BMD Fox Records, Toy's Factory, Amuse, Inc.; Formats: DVD, Blu-ray	11	6
Babymetal Legend 43: The Movie	Released: 11 December 2024; Label: BMD Fox Records, Toy's Factory, Amuse, Inc.; Formats: DVD, Blu-ray	8	4
Babymetal: Live At The O2 Arena	Released: 19 December 2025; Label: BMW Fox Records, Amuse, Inc.; Formats: DVD, Blu-ray	–	–
Babymetal: Live At Intuit Dome	Released: 17 June 2026; Label: BMW Fox Records, Amuse, Inc.; Formats: DVD, Blu-ray	–	–
"—" denotes a recording that did not chart or was not released in that territory.

"The One" exclusive limited releases

- Babymetal World Tour 2014 Apocalypse (2015)
- Legend 2015: New Year Fox Festival (2015)
- Trilogy: Metal Resistance Episode III – Apocalypse (2016) — later made available in limited quantities on 19 September 2016.
- The Chosen 500 (2018) — limited to five hundred copies.
- The Fox Festivals in Japan 2017: The Five Fox Festival & Big Fox Festival (2018)
- Metal Resistance Episode VII – Apocrypha: The Chosen Seven (2019)
- Babymetal Awakens: The Sun Also Rises (2020)
- Metal Galaxy World Tour in Japan (2020)

== EPs ==
List of EPs
Title	EP details
Introducing Babymetal	Released: 16 September 2015 (JP); Label: BMD Fox Records, Toy's Factory, Amuse, Inc.; Formats: CD/DVD (rental exclusive)

== Singles ==
=== 2010s ===
List of singles, with selected chart positions
Title	Year	Peak chart positions					Album
Title	Year	JPN	JPN Hot	JPN Sales	UK Phy.	US World	Album
"Doki Doki Morning"	2011	—	—	—	—	—	Babymetal
"Babymetal / Kiba of Akiba" (with Kiba of Akiba)	2012	46	—	50	—	—	Babymetal
"Headbangeeeeerrrrr!!!!!"	2012	20	—	19	—	—	Babymetal
"Ijime, Dame, Zettai"	2013	6	14	5	—	—	Babymetal
"Megitsune"	2013	7	16	7	—	14	Babymetal
"Road of Resistance"	2015	—	—	—	—	22	Metal Resistance
"Gimme Chocolate!!"	2015	—	54	—	—	5	Babymetal
"Karate"	2016	—	17	—	—	2	Metal Resistance
"Distortion"	2018	42	6	45	26	2	Metal Galaxy
"Starlight"	2018	— (Note: "Starlight" did not enter the Oricon Singles Chart, but peaked at number 9 on the Oricon Digital Singles Chart.)	24	—	—	4	Metal Galaxy
"Elevator Girl"	2019	— (Note: "Elevator Girl" did not enter the Oricon Singles Chart, but peaked at number 13 on the Oricon Digital Singles Chart. It also peaked at number 34 on the overall Oricon Combined Singles Chart.)	38	—	—	4	Metal Galaxy
"Pa Pa Ya!!" (featuring F. Hero)	2019	— (Note: "Pa Pa Ya!!" did not enter the Oricon Singles Chart, but peaked at number 17 on the Oricon Digital Singles Chart.)	56	—	—	12	Metal Galaxy
"—" denotes a recording that did not chart or was not released in that territory.

=== 2020s ===
List of singles, with selected chart positions
Title	Year	Peak chart positions								Album
Title	Year	JPN Dig.	JPN DL	AUT	GER	NZ Hot	UK Sales	US Hard Rock	US World	Album
"BxMxC"	2020	— (Note: "BxMxC" did not enter the Oricon Digital Singles Chart, but peaked at number 25 on the Oricon Singles Chart.)	— (Note: "BxMxC" did not enter the Billboard Japan Download Songs, but peaked at number 23 on the Billboard Japan Top Singles Sales.)	—	—	—	—	—	16	Metal Galaxy
"Divine Attack (Shingeki)"	2022	20	22	—	—	—	—	—	—	The Other One
"Monochrome"	2022	25	22	—	—	—	—	—	—	The Other One
"Metal Kingdom"	2023	28	28	—	—	—	—	—	—	The Other One
"Light and Darkness"	2023	22	20	—	—	—	—	—	—	The Other One
"Metali!!" (メタり！！) (featuring Tom Morello)	2023	17	20	—	—	—	86	—	12	Metal Forth
"Ratatata" (with Electric Callboy)	2024	—	—	66	55	39	23	6	—	Metal Forth
"From Me to U" (featuring Poppy)	2025	24	27	—	—	—	65	9	—	Metal Forth
"Song 3" (with Slaughter to Prevail)	2025	—	72	—	—	—	—	21	6	Metal Forth
"Kon! Kon!" (featuring Bloodywood)	2025	—	—	—	—	—	—	—	—	Metal Forth
"My Queen" (featuring Spiritbox)	2025	—	—	—	—	—	—	—	7	Metal Forth
"—" denotes a recording that did not chart or was not released in that territory.

== Other charted and certified songs ==
List of other charted songs, with selected chart positions, album name, and certifications
Title	Year	Peak chart positions					Certifications	Album
Title	Year	NZ Hot	UK	US Bub.	US Rock / Alt.	US World	Certifications	Album
"Shanti Shanti Shanti"	2019	—	—	—	—	11		Metal Galaxy
"Kingslayer" (Bring Me the Horizon featuring Babymetal)	2020	24	51	—	26	—	ARIA: Gold; BPI: Silver; PMB: Gold; RIAA: Gold	Post Human: Survival Horror
"The End" (Lil Uzi Vert featuring Babymetal)	2023	—	— (Note: "The End" did not enter the UK Singles Chart, but peaked at number 29 on the UK Rock & Metal Singles Chart.)	8	10	—		Pink Tape
"Leave It All Behind" (F. Hero featuring Bodyslam and Babymetal)	2024	—	—	—	—	—		Non-album singles
"Eternal Flames" (Tak Matsumoto Group featuring Babymetal)	2024	—	—	—	—	—		TMG II
"The End" (Five Finger Death Punch featuring Babymetal)	2025	—	—	—	— (Note: "The End" did not enter the Hot Rock & Alternative Songs, but peaked at number 21 on the Hot Hard Rock Songs.)	—		Best of (Vol. 2)
"—" denotes a recording that did not chart or was not released in that territory.

== Music videos ==
List of music videos
Title	Year	Director(s)	Ref.
"Doki Doki ☆ Morning"	2011	Shimon Tanaka	
"Iine!"	2012	Daishinszk	
"Iine!" (Live in Tokyo 2012)	2012	Mikiko	
"Headbangeeeeerrrrr!!!!!"	2012	Hidenobu Tanabe	
"Babymetal Death"	2012	Unknown	
"Ijime, Dame, Zettai"	2013	Kamimetal (Note: Also known as Satoshi Kamiguchi (神口 智志). He directed a lot of music videos for different Japanese artists including the female idol group Cute, the male hip-hop group Cyclamen and many others.)	
"Megitsune"	2013	Takuya Tada	
"Gimme Chocolate!!"	2014	Ryosuke Machida	
"Road of Resistance"	2015	Ryosuke Machida	
"Karate"	2016	Daisuke Ninomiya	
"The One"	2016	Unknown	
"Distortion"	2018	Daichi Yasuda	
"Starlight"	2018	Unknown	
"Pa Pa Ya!!"(featuring F. Hero)	2019	Yoshiteru Nomiyama, Eri Sakuragi	
"Elevator Girl" (English ver.)	2019	Unknown	
"Shanti Shanti Shanti"	2019	Unknown	
"Da Da Dance" (featuring Tak Matsumoto)	2019	Unknown	
"BxMxC"	2020	Shimon Tanaka	
"Metal Kingdom"	2023	Unknown	
"Light and Darkness"	2023	Unknown	
"Mirror Mirror"	2023	Unknown	
"Metalizm"	2023	Unknown	
"メタり！！" (featuring Tom Morello)	2023	Takuya Tada	
"Ratatata" (with Electric Callboy)	2024	Schillobros.	
"From Me to U" (feat. Poppy)	2025	Takuya Oyama	
"Song 3" (with Slaughter to Prevail)	2025	Takasuke Kato	
"Kon! Kon!" (feat. Bloodywood)	2025	Unknown	
"My Queen" (feat. Spiritbox)	2025	Deathcats	
"ヘドバンギャー！！ 15th Night Ver."	2026	Takuya Tada	

== Collaborations ==
Year	Artist	Song	Ref.
2020	Bring Me The Horizon	"Kingslayer"	
2023	Tom Morello	"Metali!! (メタり！！)"	
2024	Electric Callboy	"Ratatata"	
2024	Bloodywood	"Bekhauf"	
2025	Poppy	"From Me to U"	
2025	Slaughter to Prevail	"Song 3"	
2025	Bloodywood	"Kon! Kon!"	
2025	Spiritbox	"My Queen"	
2025	JAM Project	"Get No Satisfied!"	
2025	Five Finger Death Punch	"The End 2025"	
2026	Tatsuya Kitani	"Kasuka na Hana (かすかなはな)"	
