= Legend – Metal Galaxy =

- LP cover

Live album by Babymetal
- Released: September 9, 2020
- Recorded: January 25, 2020 (Day 1); January 26, 2020 (Day 2)
- Venue: Makuhari Messe
- Genre: Kawaii metal; J-pop; heavy metal
- Length: 64:47 (Day 1); 70:45 (Day 2)
- Language: Japanese; English
- Label: BMD Fox; Toy's Factory; Amuse
- Producer: Kobametal

Babymetal album chronology
Metal Galaxy (2019)	Legend – Metal Galaxy (2020)	10 Babymetal Years (2020)

Babymetal video chronology
Live at the Forum (2020)	Legend – Metal Galaxy (2020)	10 Babymetal Budokan (2021)

Legend – Metal Galaxy (Note: Full title rendered as Legend – Metal Galaxy (Metal Galaxy World Tour in Japan Extra Show), stylized in all caps) is the ninth live video album by Japanese heavy metal band Babymetal. The video contains footage from a pair of performances at Makuhari Messe in January 2020 as part of the Metal Galaxy World Tour, and was released on September 9, 2020 in Japan by BMD Fox Records and Toy's Factory. A pair of live albums (subtitled Day 1 and Day 2) were also released the same day, being available through streaming platforms and digital download internationally.

== Background ==
The two shows on January 25 and 26, 2020 were first announced on September 30, 2019 as an encore leg for the Metal Galaxy World Tour following the set of performances in November 2019. The performances are themed accordingly, with the first day focusing on the "world of light" and performing songs from the first disc of Metal Galaxy, while the second day centers around the "world of darkness" and takes songs from the second disc. The shows take place during the band's Metal Galaxy World Tour, and no songs are replayed among the two. According to Moametal, there was surprise about debuting live performances of four songs in the two shows, and satisfaction for being able to show off the new songs.

Legend – Metal Galaxy was released in multiple versions, including a DVD edition, Blu-ray formats in standard and limited editions (the latter was enclosed in an LP-sized case), a box set containing the Blu-ray and two-disc live album that was made exclusive to "The One" fanclub members, and standalone live album releases for each performance. The latter is the third set of dedicated live albums released since Live at Wembley in 2016. The album has since been released in a vinyl format on September 22, 2021 to commemorate the band's tenth anniversary.

To commemorate the release of the album, the band uploaded a livestream entitled "Babynet Da Da Da", a teleshopping program in which highlights of the album are discussed, and promotions were made for the release. Additionally, several venues in Japan hosted screenings for the performances upon its release.

== Development ==
According to Su-metal, each song performed had distinct choreography, and the band wanted to give off a different theme for each day, specifically with the "cute" side on the first day and the "cool" side on the second day. Rehearsals for some songs had given off the idea that they would not be performed at any other shows for some time. Moametal found that performing as a support for Su-metal took triple the effort as she was performing with her in every song, unlike the Avengers that would cycle out, and she would need to match each dancer's style to synchronize properly with the performances on stage.

Regarding the performances of each song, Su-metal noted that performing songs like "Brand New Day" felt significantly different from recording in a studio due to the added dances, noting that the choreography of Mikikometal was made to capture sound and at the same time and yet the moves formed during recording were a precursor to it. Regarding "Oh! Majinai", the dance was considered cute and comical, and the band members suspected the audience would laugh upon seeing a backdrop of Joakim Brodén.

== Content ==
The shows mark the first live performance featuring the older accompanying East Kami Band prominent before 2019, the West Kami Band formed around the release of Metal Galaxy, and all three members of the Avengers in the same set of shows. Throughout the performances, the Avengers—Kano Fujihira, Riho Sayashi, and Momoko Okazaki—cycle in to fill in the role of Yuimetal after her departure, while all the Avengers and band members participate in the final song of each show.

The first day of the shows features performances of songs from the first disc of Metal Galaxy, as well as "Gimme Chocolate!!", "Megitsune", and "The One", showcasing the band's "light side" spanning from the band's debut to around the release of Metal Resistance in 2016. Many song elements highlight the Eurobeat inspiration of early songs, the worldwide inspiration of music, and a more fun and comedic side to the band. The final song performed is "Road of Resistance" featuring the members of both Kami Bands, as well as all three Avengers dancing alongside Su-metal and Moametal.

The second performance day focuses more on the band's "dark side" that began in 2018 with the departure of Yuimetal, the Babymetal World Tour 2018, and the inclusion of backup dancers, with most music performed originating from the second disc of Metal Galaxy, as well as songs like "Karate", "Syncopation", and "Headbangeeeeerrrrr!!!!!". The final song performed with all the accompaniments is "Ijime, Dame, Zettai", which had not been performed since Legend S: Baptism XX. The show concludes with announcement for Metal Resistance Episode X, the final part of the band's main lore.

== Critical reception ==
Professional ratings
Review scores
Source	Rating
Kerrang!	4/5 stars

Sam Law of Kerrang! described the Legend – Metal Galaxy as "absurdly brilliant and brilliantly absurd", and noted that, while the light vs. dark concept "doesn’t really make an awful lot of sense", and some songs may fit better on a different day, it's "impossible not to have a blast", with the band embracing color and silliness with the "pop-metal mix" and "luxuriant textures".

== Commercial performance ==
Legend – Metal Galaxy charted at number two on the Oricon DVD chart with first-week sales of 5,644 units, number three on the Oricon Blu-ray chart with first-week sales of 26,556 units, reaching the same peaks for music video DVD and Blu-ray charts, respectively.

The live album releases for Day 1 and Day 2 managed to chart on the Oricon albums chart dated September 21, 2020 at number nine and ten, respectively, with reported first-week sales of 5,231 and 5,223 copies, respectively, while the LP release charted at number 211 for the week of October 4, 2021. On the Billboard Japan Top Album Sales chart, the two albums charted at number seven and eight, respectively, reporting 5,327 and 5,321 album sales, respectively.

== Track listing ==
Legend – Metal Galaxy (Day 1)
No.	Title	Writer(s)	Length
1.	"Future Metal"	Kitsune of Metal God	4:06
2.	"Da Da Dance" (featuring Tak Matsumoto)	Kanata Okajima; Megmetal	4:18
3.	"Elevator Girl"	Ryu-metal	3:00
4.	"Shanti Shanti Shanti"	Mukti-metal; Megmetal	3:17
5.	"Oh! Majinai" (featuring Joakim Brodén)	Ryu-metal	4:48
6.	"Yava!"	Nakametal; Mk-metal; Kxbxmetal; Norimetal	3:52
7.	"Brand New Day" (featuring Tim Henson and Scott LePage)	Mk-metal; Megmetal	5:24
8.	"Gimme Chocolate!!"	Mk-metal; Kxbxmetal; Takeshi Ueda	4:44
9.	"Megitsune"	Mk-metal; Norimetal	6:01
10.	"Night Night Burn!"	Hola-metal; Norimetal	3:47
11.	"The One"	Kitsune of Metal God; Kxbxmetal; Mish-Mosh	9:11
12.	"Road of Resistance"	Kitsune of Metal God; Mk-metal; Kxbxmetal; Mish-Mosh; Norimetal; Kyt-metal	12:19
Total length:			64:47

Legend – Metal Galaxy (Day 2)
No.	Title	Writer(s)	Length
1.	"In the Name Of"	Kitsune of Metal God	5:46
2.	"Distortion" (featuring Alissa White-Gluz)	Dkmetal; Takemetal	4:44
3.	"Pa Pa Ya!!" (featuring F. Hero)	Siammetal	3:59
4.	"Karate"	Yuyoyuppe	5:00
5.	"Kagerou"	Mk-metal; Yuyoyuppe	5:35
6.	"BxMxC"	Metal Cypher; Megmetal	4:07
7.	"Syncopation"	Norimetal; Kxbxmetal	5:21
8.	"Headbangeeeeerrrrr!!!!!"	Edometal; Nakametal; Narasaki	7:16
9.	"Starlight"	Metal Saints; Megmetal; Metal Skywalker	5:59
10.	"Shine"	Kitsune of Metal God; Takemetal	5:48
11.	"Arkadia"	Norimetal	5:28
12.	"Ijime, Dame, Zettai"	Nakametal; Tsubometal; Kxbxmetal; Takemetal	11:42
Total length:			70:45

Notes

- Track listing reflects lengths from the digital live albums.

== Personnel ==
Credits adapted from Legend – Metal Galaxy booklet.

- Suzuka Nakamoto (Su-metal) – lead vocals
- Moa Kikuchi (Moametal) – lead and background vocals
- Taku Fujii – photography
- Yukihide “Jon…” Takamoto – photography
- Avengers – backup dancers
- East Kami – backup band
- West Kami – backup band

== Charts ==
=== Legend – Metal Galaxy ===
Chart (2020–2021)	Peak position
Japanese Albums (Oricon)	211
Japanese DVD (Oricon)	2
Japanese Music DVD (Oricon)	2
Japanese Blu-ray (Oricon)	3
Japanese Music Blu-ray (Oricon)	3

=== Legend – Metal Galaxy (Day 1) ===
Chart (2020)	Peak position
Japanese Albums (Oricon)	9
Japanese Albums (Billboard)	7

=== Legend – Metal Galaxy (Day 2) ===
Chart (2020)	Peak position
Japanese Albums (Oricon)	10
Japanese Albums (Billboard)	8

== Release history ==
Region	Date	Format	Label	Edition(s)	Catalog	Ref.
Japan	September 9, 2020	Blu-ray, CD	BMD Fox Records; Amuse, Inc.	"The One" limited box set	ONEB-0026	
Japan	September 9, 2020	DVD; Blu-ray	BMD Fox Records; Toy's Factory; Amuse, Inc.	Video	TFXQ-78185; TFBQ-18228	
Japan	September 9, 2020	Blu-ray	BMD Fox Records; Toy's Factory; Amuse, Inc.	Limited video	TFXQ-78184	
Japan	September 9, 2020	CD	BMD Fox Records; Toy's Factory; Amuse, Inc.	Live albums (Day 1 and Day 2)	TFCC-86717; TFCC-86718	
Various	September 9, 2020	Digital download; streaming	Amuse, Inc.; Babymetal Records; Cooking Vinyl	Live albums (Day 1 and Day 2)	—N/a	
Japan	September 22, 2021	LP	BMD Fox Records; Toy's Factory; Amuse, Inc.	Live album	TFJC-38092; TFJC-38093; TFJC-38094; TFJC-38095	
