= Live at the Forum (Babymetal album) =

- LP cover

Live album by Babymetal
- Released: September 22, 2021 (live album); May 13, 2020 (video)
- Recorded: October 11, 2019
- Venue: The Forum (Inglewood, California)
- Genres: Kawaii metal; J-pop; heavy metal
- Length: 75:05
- Labels: BMD Fox; Toy's Factory; Amuse
- Producer: Kobametal

Babymetal album chronology
Legend S: Baptism XX (2021)	Live at the Forum (2021)	10 Babymetal Budokan (2021)

Babymetal video chronology
Legend S: Baptism XX (2018)	Live at the Forum (2020)	Legend – Metal Galaxy (2020)

Live at the Forum is the eighth video album by Japanese heavy metal band Babymetal first released in video formats on May 13, 2020. The album contains live footage from the band's headlining show from the Metal Galaxy World Tour, at The Forum (Inglewood, California) on October 11, 2019, coinciding with the worldwide release of the band's third album Metal Galaxy.

== Background ==
The performance was first announced, along with the digital release of "Elevator Girl", on April 22, 2019, a year after the announcement of the band's third album release in 2019, and half a year after the official departure of Yuimetal. Tickets were first made available on April 26, 2019, set at The Forum (which could house up to a capacity of 17,500 seats) and a sold-out show where the band would perform in the concept of a "journey" of the Metal Galaxy.

On January 25, 2020, the band announced an album for the performance with a release date on May 13, 2020, both in DVD and Blu-ray formats, as well as a limited edition Blu-ray and two-CD box set exclusively for "The One" fanclub members. A trailer for the album was posted on the band's official YouTube channel on March 12, 2020. The album has since been released in a vinyl format on September 22, 2021, to commemorate the band's tenth anniversary.

== Content ==
The performance begins with a large screen with visuals of starfields followed with technology materializing the figures of Su-metal and Moametal. The stage dims and the band begins playing "Da Da Dance" along with lighting and projection causing "sensory overload". The screen continues to display visuals, as the set list continues into songs like "Elevator Girl" and "Shanti Shanti Shanti". "Pa Pa Ya!!" is performed with substantial pyrotechnics, while the intro "Gimme Chocolate!!" was shown giving the audience anticipation. Choreography was described to be "marionette-like", but that of "Karate" was described as "narrative" and "theatrical". After the song "Road of Resistance", the screen repeats "We! Are! Babymetal!" in a call and response matter, with the band returning to finish the performance with "Shine" and "Arkadia". The show ends with band lore and future tour dates being shown on the screen.

== Reception ==
Live at the Forum debuted on the Oricon weekly DVD and Blu-ray charts both at number three for the week of May 25, 2020, with first-week sales od 23,000 units. The album also topped the charts for separate music DVD and Blu-ray releases, as well as the chart for combined releases, becoming the act's sixth consecutive video to do so and tying a record made with Perfume.

The album also charted on the Oricon weekly albums chart at number 268 on the week of October 4, 2021, following the release of the LP record format on September 22, 2021.

== Track listing ==
Video track list
No.	Title	Writer(s)	Length
1.	"Future Metal"	Kitsune of Metal God	5:08
2.	"Da Da Dance" (featuring Tak Matsumoto)	Kanata Okajima; Megmetal	4:18
3.	"Megitsune"	Mk-metal; Norimetal	5:58
4.	"Elevator Girl"	Ryu-metal; Joemetal	3:09
5.	"Shanti Shanti Shanti"	Mukti-metal; Megmetal	4:12
6.	"Kagerou"	Mk-metal; Yuyoyuppe	5:23
7.	"Starlight"	Metal Saints; Megmetal; Metal Skywalker	5:08
8.	"Gimme Chocolate!!"	Mk-metal; Kxbxmetal; Takeshi Ueda	4:21
9.	"Pa Pa Ya!!" (featuring F. Hero)	Siammetal	4:01
10.	"Distortion" (featuring Alissa White-Gluz)	Dkmetal; Takemetal	4:47
11.	"Karate"	Yuyoyuppe	4:59
12.	"Headbangeeeeerrrrr!!!!!"	Edometal; Nakametal; Narasaki	4:47
13.	"Road of Resistance"	Kitsune of Metal God; Mk-metal; Kxbxmetal; Mish-Mosh; Norimetal; Kyt-metal	11:21
14.	"Shine"	Kitsune of Metal God; Takemetal	6:37
15.	"Arkadia"	Norimetal	3:37
Total length:			75:05

== Personnel ==
Credits adapted from Live at the Forum booklet.

- Su-metal (Suzuka Nakamoto) – lead and background vocals, dance
- Moametal (Moa Kikuchi) – lead and background vocals (credited as "scream"), dance

== Charts ==
Chart (2020–2021)	Peak position
Japanese Albums (Oricon)	268
Japanese DVD (Oricon)	3
Japanese Music DVD (Oricon)	2
Japanese Blu-ray (Oricon)	3
Japanese Music Blu-ray (Oricon)	1

== Release history ==
Region	Date	Format	Label	Edition(s)	Catalog	Ref.
Japan	May 13, 2020	DVD; Blu-ray	BMD Fox Records; Toy's Factory; Amuse, Inc.	Standard video	TFBQ-18224; TFXQ-78181	
Japan	May 13, 2020	Blu-ray, CD	BMD Fox Records; Toy's Factory; Amuse, Inc.	"The One" limited video	ONEB-0023	
Japan	September 22, 2021	LP	BMD Fox Records; Toy's Factory; Amuse, Inc.	Live album	TFJC-38089; TFJC-38090; TFJC-38091	
