= Live at the Forum =

Live at the Forum may refer to:

- Live at the Forum (Babymetal album), a 2020 live album
- Live at the Forum (The Jackson 5 album), a 2010 live album
- Live at the Forum (The Teskey Brothers album), a 2020 live album
- Live at the Forum, a 2008 live album by Killing Joke

== See also ==
- Live Concert at the Forum, a 1972 live album by Barbra Streisand
- Live from the Forum MMXVIII, a 2020 live album by the Eagles
