= BxMxC =

- 12" single cover

Single by Babymetal

from the album Metal Galaxy
- Language: Japanese; English
- Released: October 9, 2020
- Genre: Trap metal
- Length: 3:03
- Label: BMD Fox; Amuse, Inc.; Toy's Factory
- Composer(s): Metal Cypher; Megmetal
- Lyricist(s): Metal Cypher
- Producer(s): Kobametal; Megmetal (arrangement)

Babymetal singles chronology
"Pa Pa Ya!!" (2019)	"BxMxC" (2020)	"Divine Attack (Shingeki)" (2022)

Music video
- "BxMxC" on YouTube

"BxMxC" (pronounced "bee-em-see") is a song by Japanese heavy metal band Babymetal. First released as part of the Japan Complete edition of Metal Galaxy in 2019, the song made its international release as a digital single on October 9, 2020.

== Background and release ==
With the release of the band's third album Metal Galaxy in 2019, "BxMxC" was not included in the track listing for international editions. Consequently, the song was first made available internationally through the band's debut live performance at the show Legend – Metal Galaxy in January 2020, with its double live album having been made available on streaming services on September 9, 2020. The song proper was made available on streaming platforms such as Apple Music on October 9, 2020, by Babymetal Records.

"BxMxC" was also released as a 12" vinyl single in Japan on December 9, 2020, with a live performance of the song from Legend – Metal Galaxy as its B-side. The single artwork includes lettering of the song title designed by Toshihiro Egawa.

== Composition ==
"BxMxC" is described under the genre of trap metal, containing elements of hip hop combining the flow Su-metal with the screams of Moametal. The sense of the genre has been described as freestyle, analogous to the varied elements of metal music adapted by the band in general. Lyrically, there are recurring references to a concept called the "Metal Cypher".

Musically, the song uses hip hop elements with deep bass rifts to contrast with the Auto-Tune vocals, with significant use of the nine-string guitar.

== Reception ==
Will Hodgkinson of The Times wrote in a review of the band's live performances that, compared to the overall unfavorable opinion, "BxMxC" was "exhilirating".

"Pa Pa Ya!!" charted and peaked on the Oricon Digital Singles weekly chart at number 25 for the week of December 21, 2020. In the United States, "BxMxC" charted on the Billboard World Digital Songs chart at number sixteen on the week of October 23, 2020, becoming the act's tenth song to place on the chart.

== Music video ==
The music video for "BxMxC" was uploaded to YouTube on October 8, 2020, to coincide with the international release of the digital single, and is the first music video released to not be based on a previous live performance since "Karate". Directed by Shimon Tanaka (who had also previously directed the music video for "Doki Doki ☆ Morning"), the video makes visual references to the repeated mentions of the "Metal Cypher" as a rap battle performed to break new ground in the heavy metal genre. The concept of the video has been compared to Mortal Kombat internationally, with depictions of the band members taking on elements like fire and lightning, and ultimately celebrating their victory with a crowd of fans.

== Track listing ==
Digital download

- "BxMxC" – 3:03

12" single

- A. "BxMxC"
- B. "BxMxC" (live at Legend – Metal Galaxy)

== Charts ==
Chart (2020)	Peak position
Japan (Oricon)	25
US World Digital Songs (Billboard)	12

== Release history ==
Region	Date	Format	Label	Ref.
Various	October 9, 2020	Digital download, streaming	Amuse, Inc.; Babymetal Records; Cooking Vinyl	
Japan	December 9, 2020	12" single	BMD Fox Records; Toy's Factory; Amuse, Inc.	
