= Metal Galaxy =

- Standard edition artwork

Studio album by Babymetal
- Released: October 8, 2019
- Genre: Kawaii metal
- Length: 58:44
- Languages: Japanese; English
- Labels: Babymetal; BMD Fox; Toy's Factory; Amuse
- Producer: Kobametal

Babymetal chronology
Live at Wembley (2016)	Metal Galaxy (2019)	Legend – Metal Galaxy (2020)

Singles from Metal Galaxy
- 1. "Distortion" Released: May 8, 2018; 2. "Starlight" Released: October 19, 2018; 3. "Elevator Girl" Released: May 10, 2019; 4. "Pa Pa Ya!!" Released: June 28, 2019; 5. "BxMxC" Released: October 9, 2020

Metal Galaxy is the third studio album by Japanese heavy metal band Babymetal. It was first released in Japan on October 8, 2019, with an international release following on October 11, 2019. The album was released through BMD Fox Records in Japan, in Europe under earMusic, and elsewhere under Babymetal Records. Produced by the band's manager Kobametal, the record is a concept album of an "odyssey to the Metal Galaxy" and contains elements of music from various parts of the world. It is also the first to contain guest performances from other artists, as well as their first release to not feature founding member Yuimetal. Due to Yuimetal's poor health, the band performed with one backup dancer to form a trio alongside Su-metal and Moametal. The band began a world tour in support of the album in September 2019, with support from Avatar and The Hu in the United States and Bring Me the Horizon in Japan.

Metal Galaxy received generally positive reviews from music critics, and managed to peak at number three on the Oricon Weekly Chart with first-week sales of 73,096 units. In the United States, the album debuted at number thirteen on the Billboard 200, becoming the highest-charting Japanese-language album in the chart's history. Five songs from the album were released as digital singles, with "Distortion", "Starlight", "Elevator Girl", "Pa Pa Ya!!" and "BxMxC" charting within the top four on the Billboard World Digital Songs chart. The album has sold 96,735 copies in Japan as of December 2019.

== Background and release ==
On April 1, 2019, three years after the worldwide release of the band's second album Metal Resistance, Babymetal announced a third album with a release set for 2019, as well as a series of headlining shows in Japan, Babymetal Awakens: The Sun Also Rises and Babymetal Arises: Beyond the Moon – Legend "M" in the summer. With its title later revealed to be Metal Galaxy, it is the band's first album not to feature original member Yuimetal, who left the band in October 19, 2018 due to a medical issue.

Metal Galaxy was released in several editions varying by region. In Japan, the album was released in 16-track 2-disc editions via a standard edition in compact disc and LP formats, a CD limited edition with a DVD of music videos, "Sun" and "Moon" limited editions enclosed in LP-size jackets, and "The One" limited edition with a DVD, exclusively available to members of "The One" official fanclub. The album was also made available earlier in the region, on October 8, 2019. Internationally, the album was released in a standard 14-track single-disc edition, a 2-LP edition in black or transparent vinyl, and a download card, in various combinations.

On August 9, 2019, the band released the artwork for the Japanese "Sun" and "Moon" editions, along with the track listings for all editions of Metal Galaxy. The same day, pre-orders for the album were made available in physical and digital editions.

== Composition ==
The band described the theme of the album as going "on an odyssey to the Metal Galaxy". Su-metal stated that the album is "like a toybox, with a different mixture of songs in there". The vocalist explained that, while Babymetal and Metal Resistance "had cool sounds to the songs", Metal Galaxy has a "new type of kawaii metal", and incorporates the sound of different countries in which the band has toured since the release of Metal Resistance, reflecting the "journey" made in the previous years. Kobametal stated that he wanted to create Babymetal in the image of the cultural diversity found around the world in music, with Metal Galaxy being a "conceit to explore this idea". The opening track "Future Metal" includes robotic narration stating: "This ain't heavy metal, welcome to the world of Babymetal" with a following "electronic flurry", "Elevator Girl" has elements of "languid jazz", "Shanti Shanti Shanti" is composed of Indian instrumentation, and "Night Night Burn!" contains elements of Latin music. Additionally, the songs "Starlight", "Shine", and "Arkadia" were called "a trilogy of lights". The album also features guest musicians, including gruff growls by Sabaton frontman Joakim Brodén on the track "Oh! Majinai", Arch Enemy member Alissa White-Gluz, and Thai rapper F. Hero on "Pa Pa Ya!!", continuing the band's trend of creating unconventional music. Additionally, "Da Da Dance" features B'z guitarist Tak Matsumoto, and "Brand New Day" features Polyphia guitarists Tim Henson and Scott LePage.

According to Kobametal, songwriting for Metal Galaxy began when he gathered songwriters together to discuss the kind of music in desire of exploration. Musical styles included Cuban rhythms, South American tribal music, and Scandinavian metal. "Night Night Burn!" is said to have started six years prior, at the same time as the production for the song "Megitsune".

== Promotion ==
Metal Galaxy World Tour
- World tour by Babymetal
- Location: North America; Asia; Europe
- Start date: September 4, 2019
- End date: March 1, 2020
- Legs: 3
- No. of shows: 46
- Supporting acts: Avatar; The Hu; Bring Me the Horizon; Skynd; Creeper

Babymetal concert chronology
- Babymetal World Tour 2018 (2018); Metal Galaxy World Tour (2019–2020)

On April 1, 2019, Babymetal announced a series of headlining shows, Babymetal Awakens: The Sun Also Rises and Babymetal Arises: Beyond the Moon – Legend "M", with the latter shows taking place around Moametal's twentieth birthday, as a counterpart to Su-metal's Legend S: Baptism XX. The first set of shows, Babymetal Awakens, was performed at Yokohama Arena and with a dancer taking Yuimetal's place. Immediately after the second show, the band travelled to the United Kingdom to perform at Glastonbury Festival 2019 on June 30, 2019. Three support dancers—Kano Fujihira, Riho Sayashi, and Momoko Okazaki—officially termed the Avengers, took turns filling Yuimetal's role in the original trio formation. Titled as Metal Resistance Episode VIII, the era of Babymetal features a theme that the Avengers are said to be summoned by the Fox God.

Tour dates for the yet unnamed Metal Galaxy World Tour were first announced on May 10, 2019, with dates ranging from September 4, 2019 to March 1, 2020. A headlining show at The Forum in Los Angeles set to coincide with the release of Metal Galaxy.

On June 28, 2019, following the release of the single "Pa Pa Ya!!" and the band's subsequent performances at Yokohama Arena on June 28 and 29, Babymetal revealed the title of the record to be Metal Galaxy. The Metal Galaxy World Tour began in the United States on September 4, 2019, and was scheduled to conclude in Taiwan on April 3, 2020. The band's performance at The Forum near Los Angeles on October 11, 2019, coincided with the worldwide release date of Metal Galaxy. On October 13, 2019, Babymetal announced another leg of the tour to take place in Asia. On December 4, 2019, Babymetal announced another European leg of the tour, including an appearance at Download Festival in the United Kingdom.

Metal Galaxy World Tour

Date	City	Country	Venue	Opening act
North America
September 4, 2019	Orlando	United States	Hard Rock Live	Avatar
September 6, 2019	Atlanta	United States	Coca-Cola Roxy	Avatar
September 8, 2019	Washington	United States	The Anthem	Avatar
September 11, 2019	Boston	United States	House of Blues	Avatar
September 13, 2019	Philadelphia	United States	The Fillmore	Avatar
September 15, 2019	New York City	United States	Terminal 5	Avatar
September 18, 2019	Detroit	United States	The Fillmore Detroit	Avatar
September 20, 2019	Chicago	United States	Aragon Ballroom	Avatar
September 21, 2019	Saint Paul	United States	Myth Live Event Center	Avatar
September 23, 2019	Kansas City	United States	Uptown Theater	Avatar
September 24, 2019	Dallas	United States	Southside Ballroom	Avatar
September 27, 2019	Denver	United States	Ogden Theatre	Avatar
September 28, 2019	Salt Lake City	United States	The Union Event Center	Avatar
September 30, 2019	Las Vegas	United States	House of Blues	Avatar
October 1, 2019	Tempe	United States	Marquee Theatre	Avatar
October 4, 2019	San Francisco	United States	The Warfield	Avatar
October 11, 2019	Inglewood	United States	The Forum	—N/a
October 13, 2019 (Note: The concert of October 13, 2019 in Sacramento, United States is a part of Aftershock Festival.)	Sacramento	United States	Discovery Park	—N/a
October 15, 2019	Portland	United States	Roseland Theater	The Hu
October 16, 2019	Seattle	United States	The Paramount Theatre	The Hu
Asia
November 16, 2019	Saitama	Japan	Saitama Super Arena	Bring Me the Horizon
November 17, 2019	Saitama	Japan	Saitama Super Arena	Bring Me the Horizon
November 20, 2019	Osaka	Japan	Osaka-jō Hall	Bring Me the Horizon
November 21, 2019	Osaka	Japan	Osaka-jō Hall	Bring Me the Horizon
December 16, 2019 (Note: The concerts of December 17 and 17, 2019 in Tokyo, Japan at Zepp DiverCity are billed as Apocrypha: Another Galaxy. These shows are exclusive to members of the band's official fanclub The One, and do not appear as a main tour date.)	Tokyo	Japan	Zepp DiverCity	—N/a
December 17, 2019	Tokyo	Japan	Zepp DiverCity	—N/a
December 28, 2019 (Note: The concert of December 28, 2019 in Tokyo, Japan at the Earth Stage is part of Countdown Japan.)	Tokyo	Japan	Earth Stage	—N/a
January 25, 2020 (Note: The concerts of January 25 and 26, 2020 in Chiba, Japan at Makuhari Messe are billed as Legend "Metal Galaxy".)	Chiba	Japan	Makuhari Messe	—N/a
January 26, 2020	Chiba	Japan	Makuhari Messe	—N/a
Europe
February 3, 2020	Stockholm	Sweden	Fryshuset	Skynd
February 4, 2020	Oslo	Norway	Sentrum Scene	Skynd
February 5, 2020	Copenhagen	Denmark	Vega Main Hall	Skynd
February 8, 2020	Hamburg	Germany	Große Freiheit 36	Skynd
February 9, 2020	Paris	France	Élysée Montmartre	Skynd
February 11, 2020	Vienna	Austria	Gasometer	Skynd
February 13, 2020	Cologne	Germany	Carlswerk Victoria	Skynd
February 14, 2020	Berlin	Germany	Huxleys	Skynd
February 16, 2020	Brussels	Belgium	AB	Skynd
February 17, 2020	Tilburg	Netherlands	013	Skynd
February 19, 2020	Glasgow	Scotland	Barrowland	Creeper
February 20, 2020	Cardiff	Wales	The Great Hall	Creeper
February 22, 2020	Manchester	England	O2 Apollo	Creeper
February 23, 2020	London	England	Eventim Apollo	Creeper
February 26, 2020	Helsinki	Finland	House of Culture	—N/a
February 28, 2020	Saint Petersburg	Russia	M1	—N/a
March 1, 2020	Moscow	Russia	Adrenaline Stadium	—N/a

Cancelled/postponed shows

Date	City	Country	Venue	Reason
Asia
November 23, 2019 (Note: The concert of November 21, 2019 in Hong Kong was scheduled to be a part of Clockenflap.)	Hong Kong	Hong Kong	Central Harbourfront	Cancelled due to 2019–20 Hong Kong protests
March 20, 2020	Chiba	Japan	Knotfest	Cancelled due to the COVID-19 pandemic
March 22, 2020	Bangkok	Thailand	GMM Live House	Cancelled due to the COVID-19 pandemic
March 27, 2020	Kuala Lumpur	Malaysia	KL Live	Cancelled due to the COVID-19 pandemic
March 29, 2020	Jakarta	Indonesia	Gelora Bung Karno Stadium	Cancelled due to the COVID-19 pandemic
April 3, 2020	Taipei	Taiwan	National Taiwan University Sports Center	Cancelled due to the COVID-19 pandemic
May 16, 2020	Manila	Philippines	Pulp Summer Slam Festival	Cancelled due to the COVID-19 pandemic
Europe
June 6, 2020	Nürnberg	Germany	Rock im Park	Cancelled due to the COVID-19 pandemic
June 7, 2020	Nürburgring	Germany	Rock am Ring	Cancelled due to the COVID-19 pandemic
June 8, 2020	Warsaw	Poland	Stodola	Cancelled due to the COVID-19 pandemic
June 10, 2020	Nickelsdorf	Austria	Nova Rock Festival	Cancelled due to the COVID-19 pandemic
June 11, 2020	Interlaken	Switzerland	Greenfield Festival	Cancelled due to the COVID-19 pandemic
June 12, 2020	Interlaken	Switzerland	Greenfield Festival	Cancelled due to the COVID-19 pandemic
June 13, 2020	Interlaken	Switzerland	Greenfield Festival	Cancelled due to the COVID-19 pandemic
June 14, 2020	Donington	England	Download Festival	Cancelled due to the COVID-19 pandemic
June 17, 2020	Utrecht	Netherlands	Tivoli Ronda	Cancelled due to the COVID-19 pandemic
June 19, 2020	Dessel	Belgium	Graspop Metal Meeting	Cancelled due to the COVID-19 pandemic
June 21, 2020	Clisson	France	Hellfest	Cancelled due to the COVID-19 pandemic
June 23, 2020	Madrid	Spain	La Riviera	Cancelled due to the COVID-19 pandemic
June 24, 2020	Barcelona	Spain	Razzmatazz	Cancelled due to the COVID-19 pandemic

== Singles ==
The first single released from the album, "Distortion" was released as a digital single on May 8, 2018, just short of the band's fourth world tour, the Babymetal World Tour 2018. A music video released the same day did not feature any of the band members of Babymetal, but rather the Chosen Seven of the era. The song charted at number two on the Billboard World Digital Singles chart. The song later had a limited-edition LP release on November 23, 2018. The album version features Alissa White-Gluz of the band Arch Enemy.

"Starlight" was released digitally as the second single from the album on October 19, 2018, prior to the Japanese leg of the Babymetal World Tour 2018, and coinciding with Yuimetal's official departure from the band. A music video was released on the same day. The song managed to peak at number two on the Billboard World Digital Singles chart.

The third single, "Elevator Girl", was released digitally on May 10, 2019, along with the band's announcement of the Metal Galaxy World Tour. The song reached number four on the Billboard World Digital Singles chart. A music video for an English-language version of the song was released on August 16, 2019.

"Pa Pa Ya!!" was released as the fourth single from the album on June 28, 2019, just before the first show Babymetal Awakens: The Sun Also Rises. A live performance of the song was released as a music video on July 1, 2019.

On September 27, 2019, Babymetal released a music video for the song "Shanti Shanti Shanti" on YouTube, having been released digitally as a promotional single for the album the same day (based on time zone).

On October 9, 2020, Babymetal uploaded a music video for "BxMxC" to YouTube, released the song worldwide as a digital single, and announced a December 9, 2020 release for Japanese limited-edition vinyl coupled with a live performance of the track at the show "Legend – Metal Galaxy".

== Critical reception ==
Professional ratings
Aggregate scores
Source	Rating
Metacritic	69/100
Review scores
Source	Rating
AllMusic	3.5/5 stars
Clash Music	6/10
Classic Rock	7/10
Consequence of Sound	B+
The Guardian	3/5 stars
Kerrang!	4/5 stars
The Line of Best Fit	6.5/10
NME	3/5 stars
Pitchfork	4.7/10
Sputnikmusic	3.7/5

Metal Galaxy received generally positive reviews from music critics, with most praising the instrumentation and diversity of the music. At Metacritic, which assigns a normalized rating out of 100 to reviews from mainstream publications, the album received an average score of 69, which indicates "generally favorable reviews", based on ten reviews.

Andrew Trendell of NME called the album a "wild ride that, through its sheer energy, is somehow infectiously accessible", while Classic Rock called the album "Wonderfully schizophrenic and shamelessly populist". A review by Kerrang! noted that "everything fizzes and bursts and explodes with neon delight" with a sound that's unique, yet familiar. Dean Van Nguyen of The Guardian considered the record "the kawaii metal My Beautiful Dark Twisted Fantasy" and an opus of the genre, and commented that the "pop vocals and traditional metal yelps creates a good-versus-evil battle that resembles dueling kaiju". Jason Pettigrew of Alternative Press called Metal Galaxy "striking in its abject weirdness", highlighting "In The Name Of" as "the best metallae-ton jam you've ever heard ". AllMusic writer James Christopher Monger made note how the album "tweaks the recipe just enough to feel fresh while maintaining the meticulous attention to detail and decibels", and that the opening track "Future Metal" presents the "idea of globe-trotting" throughout the album.

Sam Walker-Smart of Clash Music noted that while the album won't likely draw in listeners who don't look past the band's gimmick, "it's ridiculously fun in places, and it's clear that the musicians have a real love and understanding of the genre." Michael Pementel from Consequence of Sound called the record the band's "heaviest and most exhilarating work to date", despite some songs not being super "metal", and stated that the "hyper instrumentation that explores various musical styles throughout the world" expands the band's catchiness. Sarah Shodipe of The Line of Best Fit praised the opening track "Future Metal" for bringing "grandiose, soaring moments", but criticized "Oh! Majinai" for being "not as organic as it could". Grayson Haver Currin of Pitchfork called the record "an exultant, near-absolute mess", and, aside from the highlights of "Kagerou" and "Shine", an "embarrassing gimmickry".

=== Accolades ===
Publication	Accolade	Rank
Gigwise	51 Best Albums of 2019	45
Kerrang!	The 50 Best Albums of 2019	28
Loudwire	The 50 Best Metal Albums of 2019	–

== Commercial performance ==
Metal Galaxy debuted at number three on the Oricon Weekly Chart for the week of October 21, 2019, with 73,096 physical copies, as well as 5,700 digital copies. In the United Kingdom, the album debuted at number nineteen on the UK Albums Chart, becoming Babymetal's second Top 20 album on the chart. In the United States, Metal Galaxy debuted at number thirteen on the Billboard 200, becoming the highest-charting Japanese-language album in the chart's history, selling 28,000 copies in its first week. In the process, they also became the first Asian band to debut atop the US Top Rock Albums chart. The album has sold 96,735 copies in Japan as of December 2019.

== Track listing ==
Japan Complete standard edition – Disc 1
No.	Title	Lyrics	Music	Arrangement	Length
1.	"Future Metal"	Kitsune of Metal God^{[a]}	Kitsune of Metal God^{[a]}	Megmetal	2:05
2.	"Da Da Dance" (featuring Tak Matsumoto)	Kanata Okajima	Okajima; Megmetal	Megmetal	3:51
3.	"Elevator Girl"	Ryu-metal	Ryu-metal	Megmetal	2:46
4.	"Shanti Shanti Shanti"	Mukti-metal	Megmetal	Megmetal	3:10
5.	"Oh! Majinai" (featuring Joakim Brodén)	Ryu-metal	Ryu-metal	Tatsuometal	3:14
6.	"Brand New Day" (featuring Tim Henson and Scott LePage)	Mk-metal	Megmetal	Megmetal	4:11
7.	"↑↓←→BBAB"	Ryu-metal	Ryu-metal	Yuppemetal	3:05
8.	"Night Night Burn!"	Hola-metal; Norimetal	Norimetal	Yuppemetal; Megmetal	3:42
Total length:					26:04

Japan Complete standard edition – Disc 2
No.	Title	Lyrics	Music	Arrangement	Length
1.	"In the Name Of"	Kitsune of Metal God^{[a]}	Kitsune of Metal God^{[a]}	Megmetal; Yuppemetal	4:33
2.	"Distortion" (featuring Alissa White-Gluz)	Dkmetal; Takemetal	Takemetal	Megmetal	3:07
3.	"Pa Pa Ya!!" (featuring F.Hero)	Siammetal	Siammetal	Megmetal	3:56
4.	"BxMxC"	Metal Cypher	Metal Cypher; Megmetal	Megmetal	3:03
5.	"Kagerou"	Mk-metal	Yuyoyuppe	Yuppemetal	3:33
6.	"Starlight"	Metal Saints	Megmetal; Metal Skywalker	Megmetal	3:36
7.	"Shine"	Kitsune of Metal God^{[a]}	Takemetal	Tatsuometal	5:48
8.	"Arkadia"	Norimetal	Norimetal	Kyōtōmetal	5:23
Total length:					32:59

Japan Complete limited edition DVD – Music videos
No.	Title	Length
1.	"Distortion" (music clip)	3:05
2.	"Starlight" (music clip)	4:04
3.	"Pa Pa Ya!!" (featuring F. Hero) (music clip)	3:56
4.	"Shanti Shanti Shanti" (music clip)	3:09

"The One" limited edition DVD – Live Digest from “Babymetal Arises: Beyond the Moon – Legend M”
No.	Title	Lyrics	Music	Length
1.	"Road of Resistance"	Kitsune of Metal God^{[a]}; Mk-metal; Kxbxmetal	Mish-Mosh; Norimetal; Kyt-metal
2.	"Elevator Girl"	Ryu-metal	Ryu-metal
3.	"Distortion"	Takemetal; Dk-metal	Takemetal
4.	"Shanti Shanti Shanti"	Mukti-metal	Megmetal
5.	"Starlight"	Metal Saints	Megmetal; Metal Skywalker
6.	"Pa Pa Ya!!" (featuring F. Hero)	Siammetal	Siammetal
7.	"Headbangeeeeerrrrr!!!!!"	Edometal; Nakametal	Narasaki

International edition
No.	Title	Lyrics	Music	Arrangement	Length
1.	"Future Metal"	Kitsune of Metal God^{[a]}	Kitsune of Metal God^{[a]}	Megmetal	2:05
2.	"Da Da Dance" (featuring Tak Matsumoto)	Kanata Okajima	Okajima; Megmetal	Megmetal	3:50
3.	"Elevator Girl" (English ver.)	Ryu-metal; Joemetal (Note: Joemetal is the pen name of rock musician Joe Inoue.)	Ryu-metal	Megmetal	2:45
4.	"Shanti Shanti Shanti"	Mukti-metal	Megmetal	Megmetal	3:10
5.	"Oh! Majinai" (featuring Joakim Brodén)	Ryu-metal	Ryu-metal	Tatsuometal	3:12
6.	"Brand New Day" (featuring Tim Henson and Scott LePage)	Mk-metal	Megmetal	Megmetal	4:08
7.	"Night Night Burn!"	Hola-metal; Norimetal	Norimetal	Yuppemetal; Megmetal	3:40
8.	"In the Name Of"	Kitsune of Metal God^{[a]}	Kitsune of Metal God^{[a]}	Megmetal; Yuppemetal	4:30
9.	"Distortion" (featuring Alissa White-Gluz)	Dkmetal; Takemetal	Takemetal	Megmetal	3:04
10.	"Pa Pa Ya!!" (featuring F. Hero)	Siammetal	Siammetal	Megmetal	3:55
11.	"Kagerou"	Mk-metal	Yuyoyuppe	Yuppemetal	3:30
12.	"Starlight"	Metal Saints	Megmetal; Metal Skywalker	Megmetal	3:37
13.	"Shine"	Kitsune of Metal God^{[a]}	Takemetal	Tatsuometal	5:52
14.	"Arkadia"	Norimetal	Norimetal	Kyōtōmetal	5:18
Total length:					52:35

Notes

- ^{^[a]}"Kitsune of Metal God" refers to a god figure frequently mentioned in band materials and interviews (often as "Kitsune-sama" or the "Fox God"). Official credits under this name are registered to Kobametal.
- "Future Metal", "Da Da Dance", "In the Name Of", and "Pa Pa Ya!!" are stylized in all caps.
- "Oh! Majinai" is stylized as "Oh! MAJINAI".

== Personnel ==
Credits adapted from Metal Galaxy liner notes.

- Suzuka Nakamoto (Su-metal) – Lead vocals
- Moa Kikuchi (Moametal) – Background vocals

Additional musicians

- Tak Matsumoto – guitar on "Da Da Dance"
- Joakim Brodén – vocals on "Oh! Majinai"
- Tim Henson, Scott LePage – guitar on "Brand New Day"
- Alissa White-Gluz – vocals on "Distortion"
- F. Hero – vocals on "Pa Pa Ya!!"

Production

- Kobametal – production
- Watametal – recording
- Tue Madsen – mixing
- Nick Sampson – mixing
- Yuppemetal – mixing
- Jens Bogren – mixing
- Tucky-metal (Tucky's Mastering) – mastering

== Charts ==
=== Weekly charts ===
Weekly chart performance for Metal Galaxy
Chart (2019)	Peak position
Australian Albums (ARIA)	18
Austrian Albums (Ö3 Austria)	30
Belgian Albums (Ultratop Flanders)	44
Belgian Albums (Ultratop Wallonia)	67
Dutch Albums (Album Top 100)	95
Finnish Albums (Suomen virallinen lista)	40
French Albums (SNEP)	115
German Albums (Offizielle Top 100)	18
Japanese Albums (Oricon)	3
Japanese Albums (Billboard)	3
Scottish Albums (Official Charts)	5
Spanish Albums (Promusicae)	69
Swedish Physical Albums (Sverigetopplistan)	20
Swiss Albums (Schweizer Hitparade)	46
UK Albums (Official Charts)	19
UK Independent Albums (Official Charts)	1
UK Rock & Metal Albums (Official Charts)	1
US Billboard 200	13
US Independent Albums (Billboard)	1
US Top Hard Rock Albums (Billboard)	1
US Top Rock Albums (Billboard)	1
US World Albums (Billboard)	2

=== Monthly charts ===
Monthly chart performance for Metal Galaxy
Chart (2019)	Peak position
Japanese Albums (Oricon)	6

=== Year-end charts ===
Year-end chart performance for Metal Galaxy
Chart (2019)	Position
Japanese Albums (Oricon)	47
Japanese Albums (Billboard Japan)	50
US Top Current Album Sales (Billboard)	177
US Top Hard Rock Albums (Billboard)	49
US World Albums (Billboard)	10

== Certifications ==
Certifications for Metal Galaxy
Region	Certification	Certified units/sales
Japan (RIAJ)	Gold	100,000^{^}
^{^} Shipments figures based on certification alone.

== Release history ==
Region	Date	Format	Label	Edition(s)	Catalog	Ref.
Japan	October 8, 2019	2 CD, DVD	Babymetal Records; BMD Fox Records; Amuse, Inc.	"The One" limited	ONEC-0012	
Japan	October 8, 2019	2 CD, DVD	Babymetal Records; BMD Fox Records; Toy's Factory; Amuse, Inc.	"Japan Complete" limited	TFCC-86686	
Japan	October 8, 2019	2 CD	Babymetal Records; BMD Fox Records; Toy's Factory; Amuse, Inc.	"Sun" limited	TFCC-86684	
Japan	October 8, 2019	2 CD	Babymetal Records; BMD Fox Records; Toy's Factory; Amuse, Inc.	"Moon" limited	TFCC-86685	
Japan	October 8, 2019	2 CD	Babymetal Records; BMD Fox Records; Toy's Factory; Amuse, Inc.	"Japan Complete" standard	TFCC-86687	
Japan	October 8, 2019	2 LP	Babymetal Records; BMD Fox Records; Toy's Factory; Amuse, Inc.	"Japan Complete" standard	TFJC-38037	
Europe	October 11, 2019	CD; 2 LP; digital download	earMusic; Amuse, Inc.	International		
Various	October 11, 2019	CD; 2 LP; digital download	Babymetal Records; Amuse, Inc.; Cooking Vinyl	International		
