= Toshihiro Egawa =

Japanese artist

Toshihiro Egawa (born 1973) is a Japanese artist who created many album covers, merchandise and logo for extreme metal bands. He was born and lives in Osaka, Japan.

== List of Works ==
- 7 H.Target - 0.00 Apocalypse
- Abigail Williams - In the Shadow of a Thousand Suns
- Annotations of an Autopsy - Before the Throne of Infection
- Beheaded - Recounts of Disembodiment
- Beheaded - Ominous Bloodline
- By the Patient - Servants
- By the Patient - Premonitions
- Cenotaph - Pseudo Verminal Cadaverium
- Cenotaph - Putrescent Infectious Rabidity
- Cerebral Effusion - Smashed and Splattered Organs
- Cryptopsy - The Best of Us Bleed
- Darkall Slaves - Transcendental State of Absolute Suffering
- Death Reality - Flesh Still Feeds
- Decaying Purity - The Existence of Infinite Agony
- Decimation - Anthems of an Empyreal Dominion
- Deeds of Flesh - Reduced to Ashes
- Defeated Sanity - Chapters of Repugnance
- Defeated Sanity - Collected Demolition
- Defeated Sanity - Passages into Deformity
- Devangelic - Resurrection Denied
- Devourment - Butcher the Weak
- Devourment - Conceived in Sewage
- Disfiguring the Goddess - Sleeper
- Disfiguring the Goddess - Black Earth Child
- Disfiguring the Goddess - Deprive
- Gored - Incinerate the Vanquished
- Grotesque Formation - Basement Decompositions
- Guttural Engorgement - The Slow Decay of Infested Flesh
- Human Rejection - Torture of Decimation
- Hyonblud - Chaos from World Orgasm
- Ichor - Benthic Horizon
- Impure - In Disrespect to Mankind
- Indecent Excision - Aberration
- Infernal Revulsion - An Epic Conviction
- Ingested - Surpassing the Boundaries of Human Suffering
- Ingested - The Architect of Extinction
- Insision - End of All
- Internal Suffering - Unmercyful Extermination
- Internal Suffering - Chaotic Matrix
- Internal Suffering - Choronzonic Force Domination
- Krisiun - The Great Execution
- Lay Down Rotten - Mask of Malice, Deathspell Catharsis
- Leukorrhea - Breeding Salvation
- Lividity - Used, Abused, and Left for Dead
- Malignancy - Cross Species Transmutation
- Massacre - Back from Beyond
- Membro Genitali Befurcator - Human Destruction\
- Mortem - Death Is My Name
- Mortician - Zombie Massacre Live!
- Mucopus - Undimensional
- Pukelization - New Creation, Inorganic Fields
- Purulent Infection - Exhuming the Putrescent
- Pyrexia - Age of the Wicked, Feast of Iniquity
- Rafflesia - In the Face of Suffering
- Rotting - The Forgotten
- Saprogenic - The Wet Sound of Flesh on Concrete
- Suture - Carnivorous Urge to Kill, Morbid Sculpture: Demo(n)ology, Skeletal Vortex, Prolific Inhuman Deformity
- Terminally Your Aborted Ghost - Slowly Peeling the Flesh from the Inside of a Folded Hand
- The Partisan Turbine - The Partisan Turbine
- Through Your Silence - The Zenith Distance
- Trigger the Bloodshed - The Great Depression
- Visceral Disgorge - Ingesting Putridity
- Vomit Remnants - Supreme Vehemence (Discography '05)
