= Pa Pa Ya!! =

Single by Babymetal featuring F.Hero

from the album Metal Galaxy
- Language: Japanese; Thai; English
- Released: June 28, 2019
- Length: 3:55
- Label: Amuse, Inc.; Toy's Factory
- Songwriter(s): Siammetal
- Producer(s): Kobametal

Babymetal singles chronology
"Elevator Girl" (2019)	"Pa Pa Ya!!" (2019)	"BxMxC" (2020)

Music video
- "Pa Pa Ya!!" on YouTube

"Pa Pa Ya!!" (stylized in all caps) is a song by Japanese heavy metal band Babymetal featuring Thai rapper F.Hero. It was first released as a digital single on June 28, 2019.

== Background and release ==
"Pa Pa Ya!!" was released worldwide on June 28, 2019, just ahead of the band's performance at Yokohama Arena the same day. The song was also released as a bonus CD to the box set Metal Resistance Episode VII – Apocrypha: The Chosen Seven.

As Moametal states, "Pa Pa Ya!!" has a fun performance, and is the first of their songs to feature a rap section.

== Composition ==
Similar to other Babymetal songs, "Pa Pa Ya!!" gathers influence from various genres while preserving the band's J-pop and electronic music. With its name referring to the papaya, "Pa Pa Ya!!" contains components of southern lands, Japanese festivals, and a chaotic tune, for a "hot upper tune" in the summer. The song is composed of an "infectious synth line", "bouncy guitar riffs", and vocals repeatedly yelling "Pa pa ya", with the tune showcasing Su-metal and Moametal singing around each other in contrast to the chants and guitars. F.Hero raps a verse which provides elements of nu-metal, and applying "horror-esque synths" against the bubblegum chorus.

== Reception ==
"Pa Pa Ya!!" charted on the Oricon Digital Singles weekly chart at number 17 for the week of July 8, 2019, with first-week sales of 6,460 equivalent units, and peaked on the daily chart at number two on June 28, 2019. The song also debuted at number 78 on the Billboard Japan Hot 100 on July 8, 2019, and peaked at number 56 the following week. In the United States, "Pa Pa Ya!!" charted on the Billboard World Digital Songs chart at number twelve on the week of July 13, 2019.

== Music video ==
The music video for "Pa Pa Ya!!", filmed during a live performance at Yokohama Arena, was released on July 1, 2019. Showcasing a debut performance of the song during the concert Babymetal Awakens: The Sun Also Rises on June 29, 2019, the live performance and music video featured a guest appearance by F. Hero, who had hinted at a performance in Japan, earlier on June 1, 2019. The video showcases the summer and festive themes of the song, in front of an audience waving swinging towels all around Yokohama Arena. Su-metal and Moametal performed in "shimmering outfits" with one other dancer, Kano Fujihira of Sakura Gakuin, the idol group in which Babymetal was formerly a sub-unit, in the iconic trio for the show, backed by the supporting Kami Band.

== Track listing ==
Digital download

- "Pa Pa Ya!!" (featuring F.Hero) – 3:55

UK & Europe digital EP

1. "Pa Pa Ya!!" – 3:56
2. "Elevator Girl" – 2:44
3. "Starlight" – 3:37
4. "Distortion" – 3:05

== Charts ==
Chart (2019)	Peak position
Japan (Billboard)	56
Japan Digital Singles (Oricon)	17
US World Digital Songs (Billboard)	12

== Release history ==
Region	Date	Format	Label	Ref.
Japan	June 28, 2019	CD	BMD Fox Records	
Japan	June 28, 2019	Digital download; streaming	Amuse, Inc.; Toy's Factory	
Europe	June 28, 2019	Digital download; streaming	Amuse, Inc.; earMusic	
Various	June 28, 2019	Digital download; streaming	Amuse, Inc.; Babymetal Records; Cooking Vinyl	
