= The Five Fox Festival in Japan =

2017 concert tour by Babymetal

- Tour by Babymetal
- Promotional poster for the tour
- Location: Japan
- Start date: July 18, 2017
- End date: October 15, 2017
- Legs: 2
- No. of shows: 15

Babymetal concert chronology
- Babymetal World Tour 2016: Legend Metal Resistance (2016); The Five Fox Festival in Japan (2017); Babymetal World Tour 2018 (2018)

The Five Fox Festival in Japan (Note: The Five Fox Festival in Japan (5大キツネ祭り in JAPAN, Go Dai Kitsune Matsuri in Japan; "5 Big Fox Festival in Japan")) (stylized as THE FIVE FOX FESTIVAL in JAPAN) was a Japanese concert tour by Japanese band Babymetal. The tour ran from July 18, 2017 to October 15, 2017, taking place in Japan, commencing after the band returned from international touring where they were the opening acts for various bands from 2016 to 2017.

== Background ==
After the conclusion of the Babymetal World Tour 2016: Legend Metal Resistance, the band supported Red Hot Chili Peppers, Metallica, Guns N' Roses, and Korn on their world tours as an opening act for several of their shows. On June 16, 2017, the band performed in a standalone headlining show in Los Angeles, to an audience of 4,000 people at The Palladium, where they debuted the live performance of the international exclusive song "From Dusk Till Dawn".

The tour has been subtitled in the band's lore as Metal Resistance Episode V. The first tour dates were announced on April 2, 2017 with shows named Black Fox Festival, Red Fox Festival, Gold Fox Festival, Silver Fox Festival, and White Fox Festival, each with separate requirements for attendance. Tickets were made available for pre-sale to "The One" members on April 1, 2017 and to Japanese audiences April 12, 2017. For international audiences, tickets were awarded in a lottery from April 29 to May 9, 2017. On May 29, 2017, in response to tickets for the tour selling out, the band confirmed an additional four shows, titled Big Fox Festival in Japan (Note: Big Fox Festival in Japan (巨大キツネ祭り in JAPAN, Kyodai Kitsune Matsuri in Japan; "Huge Fox Festival in Japan")) (stylized as BIG FOX FESTIVAL in JAPAN). Tickets were made available to international audiences for presale on July 20, 2017, and via lottery on July 28, 2017 (with winners announced the following day).

The first performances of the tour, running from July 18 to July 20, 2017, were located at Akasaka Blitz, the same venue where Legend "D" was held four years prior. During the tour, the band also took part in Summer Sonic Festival in Osaka and Tokyo on August 19 and 20, respectively. When asked for the reason for starting the tour, Su-metal explained they set those events in music clubs to be able to see their fans up close, and Moametal said that she had wanted to perform in front of different audiences.

The Big Fox Festival on October 15, 2017 was the last show with Yuimetal as a member of the band, she would be absent starting with Legend S prior to leaving the band for health reasons nearly a year later.

== Controversy ==
According to the band, anyone who was unable to meet the requirements for attendance would be refused admittance to the show. The restrictions received a mixed response, with some considering it a potential innovation for concert tours in the future, or fascinating due to a potential culture gap. Others, particularly international audiences who won tickets via lottery, complained that it was unfair to be barred from shows due to not being in the correct age range. Fans have also found the age range set for the Silver Fox Festival, specifically for elementary school students and adults above the age of sixty, unusual.

== Broadcast and recording ==
The shows on October 14 and October 15, 2017 were recorded and set to stream via Wowow on April 14, 2018. Five shows from The Five Fox Festival in Japan and one from Big Fox Festival in Japan have been recorded and released as "The One" fanclub-exclusive box sets in early 2018.

== Tour dates ==
List of concerts, showing date, city, country, and venue
Date	City	Prefecture	Venue
Asia — The Five Fox Festival in Japan
July 18, 2017 (Note: This concert, titled Black Fox Festival, only allowed attendance to male audiences.)	Tokyo		Akasaka Blitz
July 19, 2017 (Note: This concert, titled Red Fox Festival, only allowed attendance to female audiences.)	Tokyo		Akasaka Blitz
July 20, 2017 (Note: This concert, titled Gold Fox Festival, only allowed attendance to teenage audiences.)	Tokyo		Akasaka Blitz
July 25, 2017 (Note: This concert, titled Silver Fox Festival, only allowed attendance to audiences in elementary school or over age 60.)	Tokyo		Zepp DiverCity Tokyo
July 26, 2017 (Note: This concert, titled White Fox Festival, only allowed attendance to audiences wearing corpse paint.)	Tokyo		Zepp DiverCity Tokyo
August 8, 2017	Nagoya	Aichi	Zepp Nagoya
August 9, 2017	Nagoya	Aichi	Zepp Nagoya
August 19, 2017 (Note: The concerts of August 19 and August 20, 2017 in Chiba, Japan at Zozo Marine Stadium are part of Summer Sonic Festival.)	Osaka	Osaka	Maishima Sports Island
August 20, 2017	Chiba	Chiba	Zozo Marine Stadium
August 29, 2017	Osaka	Osaka	Zepp Osaka Bayside
August 30, 2017	Osaka	Osaka	Zepp Osaka Bayside
Asia — Big Fox Festival in Japan
September 26, 2017	Saitama	Saitama	Saitama Super Arena
September 27, 2017	Saitama	Saitama	Saitama Super Arena
October 14, 2017	Osaka	Osaka	Osaka-jo Hall
October 15, 2017	Osaka	Osaka	Osaka-jo Hall

== Video releases ==
The Chosen 500

Box set by Babymetal
- Released: January 20, 2018
- Recorded: July 18–26, 2017
- Venue: Akasaka Blitz; Zepp DiverCity Tokyo
- Genre: Kawaii metal; J-pop; heavy metal
- Length: 269:01
- Language: Japanese; English
- Label: BMD Fox; Amuse
- Producer: Kobametal

The Fox Festivals in Japan 2017: The Five Fox Festival & Big Fox Festival

Box set by Babymetal
- Released: February 14, 2018
- Recorded: July 18–26, 2017; October 15, 2017
- Venue: Akasaka Blitz; Zepp DiverCity Tokyo; Osaka-jo Hall
- Genre: Kawaii metal; J-pop; heavy metal
- Length: 347:39
- Language: Japanese; English
- Label: BMD Fox; Amuse
- Producer: Kobametal

Footage from the tour has been released in two limited-quantity releases exclusively for "The One" fanclub members. The Chosen 500 released on January 20, 2018, and The Fox Festivals in Japan 2017: The Five Fox Festival & Big Fox Festival was released on February 14, 2018.

=== Background ===
The Chosen 500 was announced on September 22, 2017, and released exclusively to a select five hundred "The One" fanclub members on January 20, 2018. The set included footage from the first five shows of The Five Fox Festival in Japan as well as a set of colored fox masks.

The Fox Festivals in Japan 2017: The Five Fox Festival & Big Fox Festival was first announced on December 24, 2017, with shipment beginning in February 2018. The set included footage from The Five Fox Festival in Japan (the same shows included with The Chosen 500), as well as the final show from Big Fox Festival in Japan.

=== Track listings ===
The Chosen 500 includes only the first five discs as a DVD box set, while The Fox Festivals in Japan 2017: The Five Fox Festival & Big Fox Festival includes all six discs as a Blu-ray box set.

The Five Fox Festival in Japan: Black Fox Festival – July 18th, 2017 at Akasaka Blitz
No.	Title	Writer(s)	Length
1.	"Babymetal Death"	Kitsune of Metal God	6:13
2.	"Meta Taro" (META! メタ太郎)	Kxbxmetal; Ryu-metal	4:23
3.	"Catch Me If You Can"	Edometal; Narasaki	5:58
4.	"Rondo of Nightmare" (悪夢の輪舞曲)	Yuyoyuppe	4:24
5.	"Sis. Anger"	Tsubometal; Tmetal	4:12
6.	"Megitsune" (メギツネ)	Mk-metal; Norimetal	5:58
7.	"Gimme Chocolate!!" (ギミチョコ！！)	Mk-metal; Kxbxmetal; Takeshi Ueda	4:13
8.	"Doki Doki ☆ Morning" (ド・キ・ド・キ☆モーニング)	Nakametal; Norizō; Motonari Murakawa	3:48
9.	"Headbangeeeeerrrrr!!!!!" (ヘドバンギャー！！)	Edometal; Nakametal; Narasaki	4:37
10.	"Ijime, Dame, Zettai" (イジメ、ダメ、ゼッタイ)	Nakametal; Tsubometal; Kxbxmetal; Takemetal	8:16
Total length:			52:02

The Five Fox Festival in Japan: Red Fox Festival – July 19th, 2017 at Akasaka Blitz
No.	Title	Writer(s)	Length
1.	"Babymetal Death"	Kitsune of Metal God	6:12
2.	"Yava!" (ヤバッ!)	Nakametal; Mk-metal; Kxbxmetal; Norimetal	3:50
3.	"Awadama Fever" (あわだまフィーバー)	Mk-metal; Kxbxmetal; Ueda	6:18
4.	"Akatsuki" (紅月 -アカツキ-)	Nakametal; Tsubometal	6:51
5.	"Song 4" (4の歌)	Black Babymetal	4:19
6.	"Megitsune" (メギツネ)	Mk-metal; Norimetal	5:55
7.	"Gimme Chocolate!!" (ギミチョコ！！)	Mk-metal; Kxbxmetal; Ueda	4:17
8.	"Doki Doki ☆ Morning" (ド・キ・ド・キ☆モーニング)	Nakametal; Norizō; Murakawa	3:46
9.	"Headbangeeeeerrrrr!!!!!" (ヘドバンギャー！！)	Edometal; Nakametal; Narasaki	4:38
10.	"Road of Resistance"	Kitsune of Metal God; Mk-metal; Kxbxmetal; Mish-Mosh; Norimetal; Kyt-metal	7:58
Total length:			54:04

The Five Fox Festival in Japan: Gold Fox Festival – July 20th, 2017 at Akasaka Blitz
No.	Title	Writer(s)	Length
1.	"Babymetal Death"	Kitsune of Metal God	6:10
2.	"Megitsune" (メギツネ)	Mk-metal; Norimetal	5:20
3.	"Catch Me If You Can"	Edometal; Narasaki	5:50
4.	"Amore" (Amore -蒼星-)	Norimetal; Mk-metal; Kxbxmetal	5:35
5.	"GJ!"	Nakata Caos; Yuyoyuppe	3:41
6.	"Uki Uki ★ Midnight" (ウ・キ・ウ・キ★ミッドナイト)	Ryu-metal; Fuji-metal; Nakata Caos; Team-K	3:22
7.	"Headbangeeeeerrrrr!!!!!" (ヘドバンギャー！！)	Edometal; Nakametal; Narasaki	4:38
8.	"Gimme Chocolate!!" (ギミチョコ！！)	Mk-metal; Kxbxmetal; Ueda	4:10
9.	"Karate"	Yuyoyuppe	4:56
10.	"Road of Resistance"	Kitsune of Metal God; Mk-metal; Kxbxmetal; Mish-Mosh; Norimetal; Kyt-metal	7:58
Total length:			51:40

The Five Fox Festival in Japan: Silver Fox Festival – July 25th, 2017 at Zepp DiverCity Tokyo
No.	Title	Writer(s)	Length
1.	"Babymetal Death"	Kitsune of Metal God	6:09
2.	"Megitsune" (メギツネ)	Mk-metal; Norimetal	5:08
3.	"Awadama Fever" (あわだまフィーバー)	Mk-metal; Kxbxmetal; Ueda	6:19
4.	"Yava!" (ヤバッ!)	Nakametal; Mk-metal; Kxbxmetal; Norimetal	3:53
5.	"Doki Doki ☆ Morning" (ド・キ・ド・キ☆モーニング)	Nakametal; Norizō; Murakawa	3:50
6.	"Road of Resistance"	Kitsune of Metal God; Mk-metal; Kxbxmetal; Mish-Mosh; Norimetal; Kyt-metal	7:04
7.	"Gimme Chocolate!!" (ギミチョコ！！)	Mk-metal; Kxbxmetal; Ueda	4:13
8.	"Karate"	Yuyoyuppe	4:58
9.	"Headbangeeeeerrrrr!!!!!" (ヘドバンギャー！！)	Edometal; Nakametal; Narasaki	4:51
10.	"The One" (English ver.)	Kitsune of Metal God; Kxbxmetal; Mish-Mosh	9:17
Total length:			55:42

The Five Fox Festival in Japan: White Fox Festival – July 26th, 2017 at Zepp DiverCity Tokyo
No.	Title	Writer(s)	Length
1.	"Babymetal Death"	Kitsune of Metal God	6:13
2.	"Meta Taro" (META! メタ太郎)	Kxbxmetal; Ryu-metal	4:23
3.	"Catch Me If You Can"	Edometal; Narasaki	6:05
4.	"Amore" (Amore -蒼星-)	Norimetal; Mk-metal; Kxbxmetal	5:29
5.	"GJ!"	Nakata Caos; Yuyoyuppe	3:27
6.	"Syncopation" (シンコペーション)	Norimetal; Kxbxmetal	4:41
7.	"Megitsune" (メギツネ)	Mk-metal; Norimetal	6:00
8.	"Gimme Chocolate!!" (ギミチョコ！！)	Mk-metal; Kxbxmetal; Ueda	4:06
9.	"Ijime, Dame, Zettai" (イジメ、ダメ、ゼッタイ)	Nakametal; Tsubometal; Kxbxmetal; Takemetal	7:07
10.	"Road of Resistance"	Kitsune of Metal God; Mk-metal; Kxbxmetal; Mish-Mosh; Norimetal; Kyt-metal	8:00
Total length:			55:33

Big Fox Festival in Japan – October 15th, 2017 at Osaka-jo Hall
No.	Title	Writer(s)	Length
1.	"Babymetal Death"	Kitsune of Metal God	7:37
2.	"Gimme Chocolate!!" (ギミチョコ！！)	Mk-metal; Kxbxmetal; Ueda	3:55
3.	"Megitsune" (メギツネ)	Mk-metal; Norimetal	5:11
4.	"Yava!" (ヤバッ!)	Nakametal; Mk-metal; Kxbxmetal; Norimetal	6:11
5.	"Akatsuki" (紅月 -アカツキ-)	Nakametal; Tsubometal	6:56
6.	"GJ!"	Nakata Caos; Yuyoyuppe	3:36
7.	"Syncopation" (シンコペーション)	Norimetal; Kxbxmetal	5:23
8.	"Meta Taro" (META! メタ太郎)	Kxbxmetal; Ryu-metal	5:26
9.	"Ijime, Dame, Zettai" (イジメ、ダメ、ゼッタイ)	Nakametal; Tsubometal; Kxbxmetal; Takemetal	7:10
10.	"Karate"	Yuyoyuppe	5:01
11.	"Headbangeeeeerrrrr!!!!!" (ヘドバンギャー！！)	Edometal; Nakametal; Narasaki	5:26
12.	"Road of Resistance"	Kitsune of Metal God; Mk-metal; Kxbxmetal; Mish-Mosh; Norimetal; Kyt-metal	7:26
13.	"The One" (English ver.)	Kitsune of Metal God; Kxbxmetal; Mish-Mosh	9:19
Total length:			78:37
