= Live at Tokyo Dome =

2017 live video album by Babymetal

Live at Tokyo Dome: Babymetal World Tour 2016 Legend Metal Resistance - Red Night & Black Night
- Blu-ray cover

Live album and video by Babymetal
- Released: April 12, 2017 (video); September 8, 2021 (live album)
- Recorded: September 19, 2016 (Red Night); September 20, 2016 (Black Night)
- Venue: Tokyo Dome
- Genre: Kawaii metal; J-pop; heavy metal
- Length: 87:08 (Red Night); 83:48 (Black Night)
- Language: Japanese; English
- Label: BMD Fox; Toy's Factory; Amuse
- Producer: Kobametal

Babymetal album chronology
Live in London: Babymetal World Tour 2014 (2021)	Live at Tokyo Dome (2021)	Legend S: Baptism XX (2021)

Babymetal video chronology
Live at Wembley (2016)	Live at Tokyo Dome (2017)	Legend S: Baptism XX (2018)

Live at Tokyo Dome: Babymetal World Tour 2016 Legend Metal Resistance - Red Night & Black Night (Note: Stylized as LIVE AT TOKYO DOME BABYMETAL WORLD TOUR 2016 LEGEND - METAL RESISTANCE - RED NIGHT & BLACK NIGHT, and released digitally as separate shows, subtitled Red Night and Black Night, respectively in all caps.) (commonly referred to as Live at Tokyo Dome) is the sixth video album by Japanese heavy metal band Babymetal. The album contains footage from the Babymetal World Tour 2016: Legend Metal Resistance and was released on April 12, 2017 by BMD Fox Records and Toy's Factory. The album features the live performances at Tokyo Dome on September 19 and September 20, 2016, which concluded the band's world tour.

== Background ==
On December 13, 2015, the band announced a new album, as well as a world tour to begin at Wembley Arena and conclude at Tokyo Dome. Su-metal and Yuimetal expressed the idea of performing at the venue as a dream, promising to work hard to put on a great performance. On April 1, 2016, tickets to the show were made available for purchase to "The One" fanclub members, and later for presale on the band's official website on April 4, 2016. On June 3, 2016, a second day was announced for Tokyo Dome, with tickets for the second show immediately made available to "The One" fanclub members. Both days marked the band's largest venue to date. International fans were able to purchase tickets starting August 27, 2016.

In response to the band playing at the venue, Su-metal commented, "In Japan we have played many big venues like Budokan and others, but Tokyo Dome was always a place that I have been dreaming of performing at. Even in Japan, not everyone gets a chance to perform here!"

Tickets to both shows sold out, with 55,000 people attending the concerts each day. During both shows, the box set Trilogy: Metal Resistance Episode III – Apocalypse was made available for general sale. A digest of the shows would later be broadcast by Wowow on December 18, 2016.

Live at Tokyo Dome was initially announced on January 23, 2017 as a "The One" exclusive box set release for April 1, 2017, and later on April 12, 2017 in DVD and standard and limited edition Blu-ray formats. A trailer for the video album was released on March 15, 2017, containing concerts denoted as "Red Night" (September 19, 2016) and "Black Night" (September 20, 2016), respectively. The limited edition Blu-ray release came in an analog record-sized jacket, and initial pressings of the video included a Babymetal original sticker sheet.

On April 8, 2020, as part of the band's tenth anniversary, the band released the campaign "Stay Home, Stay Metal" in response to the COVID-19 pandemic, streaming the two live performances on April 10 and April 11, 2020, respectively on YouTube. Additionally, the album was released in vinyl format on September 8, 2021 to commemorate the band's tenth anniversary.

== Development ==
Compared to previous tour dates, the set was more decorated, with three tombstone-shaped catwalks connected to the center stage, where stands a tower with big screens attached in a 360˚ ring, and a platform on top of it. Said platform is connected to the stage with an elevator, and can separate into three smaller stages. In addition, the stage included lasers, explosions, pyro, and a periodically rotating center stage. The three band members wore red and black costumes, which were imitated by cosplayers who attended the shows. The audience generally contained a mix of heavy metal fans and Japanese idol fans, who would headbang, sing, or dance to each song.

For the Red Night performance, audience members were all handed crystal neck braces and urged to never take off during the show. After the performance of "Tales of The Destinies", all the neck braces gradually light up as the band transitions to "The One". Reflecting on the performance, Kobametal noted that the development for the shows was done in a little over two weeks, further commenting, "Stage-wise, technical-wise, we had a lot of things we've never done before. Of course we did rehearsals, but until you do it for real you never know how it's going to turn out, or how it's going to look because we didn't have 55,000 people to test on – you're just imagining!"

== Content ==
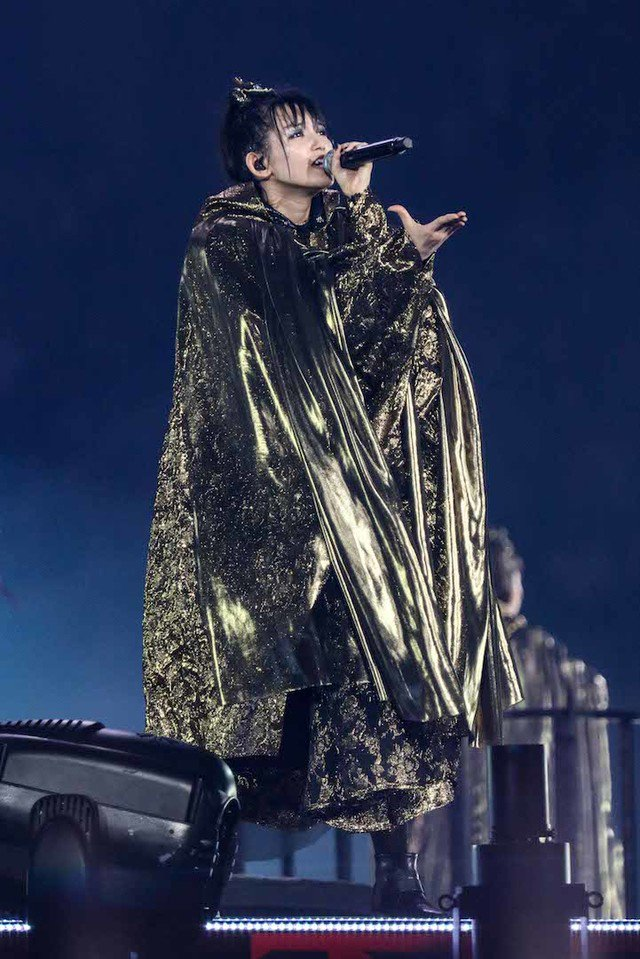
Su-metal performing "The One", the final song of "Red Night" on September 19, 2016.

The September 19 show, subtitled "Red Night", begins with an introductory video which states that the shows will not perform any song twice, nor will there be any MCs or encores. The narration explains that the crystal neck braces worn will be protection during "the harsh battle ahead", with a decree by the Fox God to not remove them. Red spotlights move around the arena, ending on the band three members who have appeared on stage with Kami Band, as the members hold flags and begin "Road of Resistance". The show mainly focused on songs released from Metal Resistance. Near the end of the concert, the band performs "Tales of The Destinies" for the first time, which leads to the entire venue going dark. Gradually, the crystal neck braces in the audience start glowing white, which transitions into the final song, the English version of "The One" which begins with the three members walking from the runways off the stage to the center, wearing golden cloaks. At the closing of the show, a video plays to remind the audience of the second show.

The show on September 20, subtitled "Black Night", focuses more on songs released from Babymetal. A video plays once more to enforce the song-repeating rule. With Kami Band playing on the stage, the three members show up crucified onto crosses on the stage, transitioning into the opener "Babymetal Death". The members walk in sync towards the center stage. During the interlude for "Megitsune", Su-metal yells to the crowd, "Are you ready? Everybody clap your hands!" while Yuimetal and Moametal continue to engage the crowd. When performing "Headbangeeeeerrrrr!!!!!" the latter two are shown in a smokescreen of carbon dioxide while the crowd headbangs to the bridge of the song. During the final song "Ijime, Dame, Zettai", the crystal neck braces worn glow red, and the song finishes with the three members repeatedly shouting "We are Babymetal!". Then they take the elevator to the top platform where Su-metal rings a gong, thus concluding Episode IV of the Metal Resistance. A final video plays, informing the audience of the band's next objective.

== Critical reception ==
Frédéric Leclercq positively reviewed the shows, which had been sold out, describing the production as "incredible" while describing the "tombstone-shaped catwalks" and screen-filled tower on the stage. The shows were described as "90 minutes of crazy lasers, explosions, pyro, the circular centre stage rotating from time to time", while the performance of Kami Band was called "flawless". Sue Williamson of Teen Vogue described the shows as "sensory overload in its most kawaii form", highlighting the band's "perfectly coordinated choreography, video elements, and totally unique sound".

== Commercial performance ==
Live at Tokyo Dome charted at number three on the Oricon DVD chart and number one on the Oricon Blu-ray chart for the week April 24, 2017, with first-week sales of 11,000 and 26,000 copies, respectively. The latter giving the band's third number one Blu-ray release and making them the female act with the fourth-most number ones on the chart, along with Nana Mizuki and AKB48, and behind Perfume, Namie Amuro and Nogizaka46. The video release also topped the charts for the DVD and Blu-ray music video charts, accumulating sales of 37,000 copies, and becoming the band's fourth consecutive release to top the latter chart.

== Track listing ==
Babymetal World Tour 2016: Legend Metal Resistance – Red Night (Disc 1)
No.	Title	Writer(s)	Length
1.	"Road of Resistance"	Kitsune of Metal God; Mk-metal; Kxbxmetal; Mish-Mosh; Norimetal; Kyt-metal	13:21
2.	"Yava!" (ヤバッ!)	Nakametal; Mk-metal; Kxbxmetal; Norimetal	4:06
3.	"Iine!" (いいね！)	Nakata Caos; Mish-Mosh	4:18
4.	"Syncopation" (シンコペーション)	Norimetal; Kxbxmetal	5:17
5.	"Amore" (Amore -蒼星-)	Norimetal; Mk-metal; Kxbxmetal	6:42
6.	"GJ!"	Nakata Caos; Yuyoyuppe	4:13
7.	"Rondo of Nightmare" (悪夢の輪舞曲)	Yuyoyuppe	5:30
8.	"Song 4" (4の歌)	Black Babymetal	6:49
9.	"Catch Me If You Can"	Edometal; Narasaki	7:21
10.	"Gimme Chocolate!!" (ギミチョコ！！)	Mk-metal; Kxbxmetal; Takeshi Ueda	4:19
11.	"Karate"	Yuyoyuppe	7:52
12.	"Tales of The Destinies"	Kitsune of Metal God; Kxbxmetal; Mish-Mosh	6:55
13.	"The One" (English ver.)	Kitsune of Metal God; Kxbxmetal; Mish-Mosh	10:25
Total length:			87:08

Notes

- "The One" limited edition includes a 2-CD audio release, splitting the performance between tracks 7 and 8.

Babymetal World Tour 2016: Legend Metal Resistance – Black Night (Disc 2)
No.	Title	Writer(s)	Length
1.	"Babymetal Death"	Kitsune of Metal God	11:20
2.	"Awadama Fever" (あわだまフィーバー)	Mk-metal; Kxbxmetal; Takeshi Ueda	4:17
3.	"Uki Uki ★ Midnight" (ウ・キ・ウ・キ★ミッドナイト)	Ryu-metal; Fuji-metal; Nakata Caos; Team-K	3:32
4.	"Meta Taro" (META! メタ太郎)	Kxbxmetal; Ryu-metal	6:52
5.	"Sis. Anger"	Tsubometal; Tmetal	3:51
6.	"Akatsuki" (紅月 -アカツキ-)	Nakametal; Tsubometal	11:05
7.	"Onedari Daisakusen" (おねだり大作戦)	Nakata Caos; Ryu-metal; Fuji-metal; Team-K	4:37
8.	"No Rain, No Rainbow"	Yoshifu-metal; Mk-metal; Nakametal	4:56
9.	"Doki Doki ☆ Morning" (ド・キ・ド・キ☆モーニング)	Nakametal; Norizō; Motonari Murakawa	4:25
10.	"Megitsune" (メギツネ)	Mk-metal; Norimetal	6:53
11.	"Headbangeeeeerrrrr!!!!!" (ヘドバンギャー！！)	Edometal; Nakametal; Narasaki	7:09
12.	"Ijime, Dame, Zettai" (イジメ、ダメ、ゼッタイ)	Nakametal; Tsubometal; Kxbxmetal; Takemetal	14:51
Total length:			83:48

Notes

- "Akatsuki" includes a prelude of Kami Band playing "Mischiefs of Metal Gods".
- "The One" limited edition includes a 2-CD audio release, splitting the performance between tracks 6 and 7.

== Personnel ==
Credits adapted from Live at Tokyo Dome booklet.

- Suzuka Nakamoto (Su-metal) – lead and background vocals
- Yui Mizuno (Yuimetal) – lead and background vocals
- Moa Kikuchi (Moametal) – lead and background vocals
- Tue Madsen – mixing, mastering
- Miyaaki Shingo – photography
- Taku Fuji – photography

== Charts ==
Chart (2017–2021)	Peak position
Japanese Albums (Oricon)	205
Japanese DVD (Oricon)	3
Japanese Music DVD (Oricon)	1
Japanese Blu-ray (Oricon)	1
Japanese Music Blu-ray (Oricon)	1

== Release history ==
Region	Date	Format	Label	Edition(s)	Catalog	Ref.
Japan	April 1, 2017	Blu-ray, CD	BMD Fox Records; Amuse, Inc.	"The One" limited	ONEB-0008; ONEB-0009; ONEC-0005; ONEC-0006; ONEC-0007; ONEC-0008	
Japan	April 12, 2017	DVD; Blu-ray	BMD Fox Records; Toy's Factory; Amuse, Inc.	Standard	TFBQ-18187; TFXQ-78150	
Japan	April 12, 2017	Blu-ray	BMD Fox Records; Toy's Factory; Amuse, Inc.	Limited	TFXQ-78149	
Worldwide	April 12, 2017	Digital download; streaming	Amuse, Inc.	Standard (Red Night and Black Night)	—N/a	
Japan	September 8, 2021	LP	BMD Fox Records; Toy's Factory; Amuse, Inc.	Live album	TFJC-38081/5	
