= Elevator Girl (song) =

Single by Babymetal

from the album Metal Galaxy
- Language: English; Japanese (original version only)
- Released: May 10, 2019
- Genre: J-pop; heavy metal
- Length: 2:44
- Label: Amuse, Inc.; Toy's Factory
- Composer(s): Ryu-metal
- Lyricist(s): Ryu-metal; Joemetal (English version only)
- Producer(s): Kobametal

Babymetal singles chronology
"Starlight" (2018)	"Elevator Girl" (2019)	"Pa Pa Ya!!" (2019)

Music video
- "Elevator Girl" (English ver.) on YouTube

"Elevator Girl" is a song by Japanese heavy metal band Babymetal. It was first released as a digital single on May 10, 2019 worldwide by Babymetal Records, and the third single released for the band's third album Metal Galaxy. An English version of the song had a release on August 16, 2019, sent to active rock radio with a music video.

== Background and release ==
"Elevator Girl" was first performed on the Babymetal World Tour 2018, on May 8, 2018. On April 23, 2019, the song was announced for release as a digital single worldwide on May 10, 2019, in conjunction with the reveal of several shows to be performed later in the year.

According to Su-metal, "Elevator Girl" symbolizes the band's evolution of kawaii and metal fusion as the band members mature into adults, and is planned to appear in the band's next album, Metal Galaxy. The song shows the "mature" side of Babymetal, as quoted.

== Composition ==
"Elevator Girl" gets inspiration from drum and bass, containing elements of the genre in the intro, and transitioning into a heavier sound. With lyrics such as “No matter what you say, or what you do / You’re going d-d-d-d-d-down”, the song is sung mainly in English. The song is composed of "riffy undertones" and "cutesy vocal harmonies" in a major key, and, as described by Joe Divite of Loudwire, switches between "fast beats with delicate, minimalist piano bits" and "crunching metallic distortion that embraces the frantic nature of the electronic elements".

== Reception ==
Axl Rosenberg of MetalSucks described "Elevator Girl" as "unusual", calling the song "the first-ever metal song about a mentally unstable elevator operator", but noting the song doesn't "[lack] any of the elements which made us fans in the first place", even after the departure of Yuimetal.

"Elevator Girl" peaked on the Oricon Digital Singles daily chart on May 10, 2019, at number two, with digital sales of 6,284 units. The song peaked on the weekly chart on May 20, 2019 at number 13, with first-week sales of 8,414 equivalent units. "Elevator Girl" debuted at number 42 on the Billboard Japan Hot 100 on May 20, 2019, with 1,069 equivalent units in the first week, later peaking at number 38 the following week. The song also peaked at number four on the Billboard World Digital Songs chart on the week of May 25, 2019.

== Music video ==
The music video for "Elevator Girl" was released on August 16, 2019. In the video, members Su-metal and Moametal, along with support dancer Kano Fujihira, can be seen dancing to the song on a raised and illuminated platform, dressed in dazzling costumes. It was released ahead of the band's 2019 US headline tour, which would begin in September.

== Track listing ==
Digital download

- "Elevator Girl" – 2:44

UK Digital EP

1. "Elevator Girl" – 2:44
2. "Starlight" – 3:37
3. "Distortion" – 3:05

== Charts ==
Chart (2019)	Peak position
Japan (Billboard)	38
Japan Digital Singles (Oricon)	13
US World Digital Songs (Billboard)	4

== Release history ==
Region	Date	Format	Label	Ref.
Japan	May 10, 2019	Digital download; streaming	Amuse, Inc.; Toy's Factory	
Europe	May 10, 2019	Digital download; streaming	Amuse, Inc.; earMusic	
Various	May 10, 2019	Digital download; streaming	Amuse, Inc.; Babymetal Records; Cooking Vinyl	
United States	August 16, 2019	Active rock (English version)	Amuse, Inc.; Babymetal Records; Cooking Vinyl	
