= Live at Wembley (Babymetal album) =

2016 live album by Babymetal

Live at Wembley: Babymetal World Tour 2016 Kicks Off at the SSE Arena, Wembley
- Live album cover

Live album and video by Babymetal
- Released: 9 December 2016 (live album); 23 November 2016 (video)
- Recorded: 2 April 2016
- Venue: Wembley Arena
- Genre: Kawaii metal; J-pop; heavy metal
- Length: 77:18 (live album); 103:19 (video)
- Language: Japanese; English
- Label: BMD Fox; Toy's Factory; Amuse
- Producer: Kobametal

Babymetal album chronology
| Metal Resistance (2016) | Live at Wembley (2016) | Metal Galaxy (2019) |

Babymetal video chronology
| Trilogy: Metal Resistance Episode III – Apocalypse (2016) | Live at Wembley (2016) | Live at Tokyo Dome (2017) |

Live at Wembley: Babymetal World Tour 2016 Kicks Off at the SSE Arena, Wembley (commonly referred to as Live at Wembley) is the second live album and fifth video album by Japanese heavy metal band Babymetal. The album contains footage from the Babymetal World Tour 2016: Legend Metal Resistance and was released on 23 November 2016 in Japan by BMD Fox Records and Toy's Factory, and on 9 December 2016 in the United Kingdom by earMusic. The album features the live performance at Wembley Arena on 2 April 2016, kicking off the band's world tour.

The received generally positive reviews from music critics, and peaked at number five, one, and two on the Oricon weekly album, DVD, and Blu-ray charts, respectively, in Japan.

== Background ==
On 26 August 2015, Babymetal announced a headline show at Wembley Arena, set for 2 April 2016, marking the first time a Japanese band headlined a show at the venue. Tickets were made available on 5 September 2015. Su-metal mentioned in an interview the importance of the United Kingdom's audience to the band, and the response to the headlining show.

"We visited Wembley Arena for the first time last June or July to see a show and said, 'It would be great if we can play at big venues like this place.' It was like a dream, so when we heard the news that the Babymetal show is confirmed at Wembley, we were flabbergasted. I thought, 'This is not a dream!'"

Later that year, the band announced a new studio album, Metal Resistance, and the Babymetal World Tour 2016: Legend Metal Resistance, confirming the performance at Wembley Arena as the first tour date. Su-metal further commented after the announcement, "We are looking forward to meeting our fans abroad again next year at Wembley Arena right after the release of our second album, so you can expect to hear our new songs for the very first time live there!!" Approximately 12,000 people ultimately attended the show, and the band set a venue record for the most merchandise sold in a day.

On 14 September 2016, a video album release was announced on the band's official website, in a DVD edition, a Blu-ray edition, and a "The One" fanclub-exclusive box set set for release on 23 November 2016. A trailer was released for the album on 11 November 2016, which simultaneously confirmed a live album release to be available in Japan on 28 December 2016, and in the United Kingdom on 9 December and 30 December, in physical and digital formats, respectively. Initial pressings of the video release included a commemorative sticker, and those of the live album release in Japan came in a sleeve jacket cover. The video album would later be released digitally online for download and streaming, along with the shows Live at Tokyo Dome and Live: Legend I, D, Z Apocalypse. The album was later re-released on 8 September 2021 in vinyl format to commemorate the band's tenth anniversary.

== Development ==
The stage resembles "towering, weathered temple ruins", along with pyrotechnics appearing throughout the concert. For the narration played during the concert, much of the story takes inspiration from Star Wars, particularly with mention of the name "Death Vader" in homage to Darth Vader. The audience reportedly included both the "pumped-up metalhead" and the "costumed kawaii kid". When asked about the crowd, Su-metal commented, "I felt like there were a lot of first-timers to our show at Wembley, so some were, at first, a little lost and unsure of what was to come at the start. But, as the show went on, there was that one moment when I could feel that we got everyone to become one together."

Additionally, during the performance of "The One", the crowd was shown holding various different flags. Yuimetal commented, "I was very happy when our fans raised up many different countries’ flags while we sang".

== Content ==
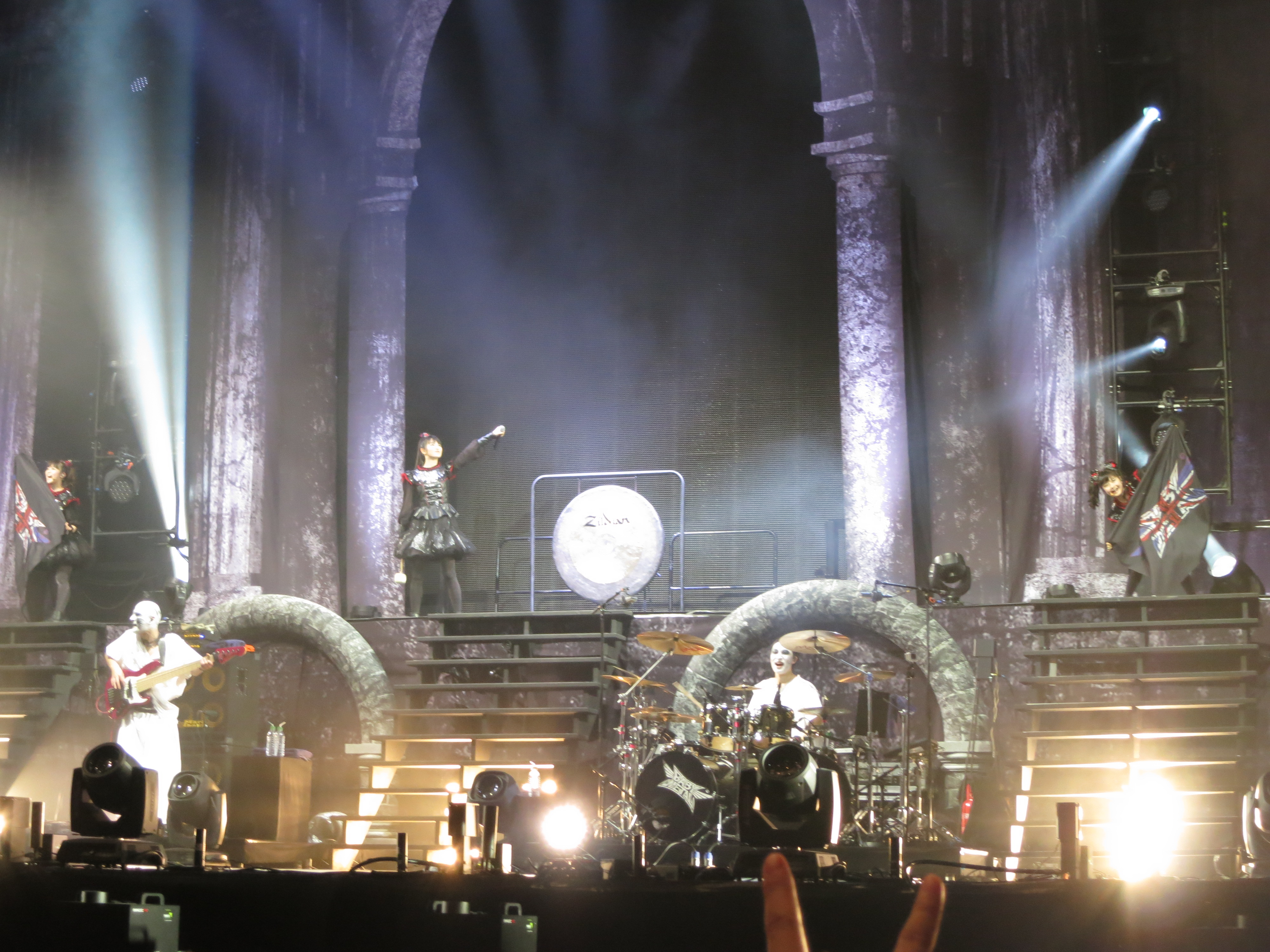
Babymetal and Kami Band perform the final song, "Road of Resistance", which concludes with Su-metal ringing the gong.

After an introductory video subtitled "Metal Resistance Episode IV: Reincarnation", as three masked figures in white robes appear on the stage, only to disappear. Next, the three members ascend from beneath the stage, performing "Babymetal Death" with ABBA-style dance moves with Kami Band supporting them. Kami Band support the three members, playing most of the music, as well as performing solos during "Catch Me If You Can". Songs from Metal Resistance performed included the Black Babymetal song "GJ!", the Su-metal solo "Amore", and an English version of the song "The One", with narration played between songs to transition between their musical styles. The show's final song "Road of Resistance" contains a Wall of Death formation in the audience, and Moametal, Yuimetal, and Su-metal thank the audience afterwards, saying "You are also precious to me. I love you!", "It is thanks to you that we are here today! We love London!", and "We are going back to Japan, but remember we are always on your side! See you!", respectively.

== Critical reception ==
Professional ratings
Review scores
| Source | Rating |
|---|---|
| AllMusic | 3.5/5 stars |
| Metal Hammer | 4/5 stars |

Live at Wembley received generally positive reviews. Tim Sendra of AllMusic noted that the "guitars are a touch more brutal and the overall sound is rougher, but the vocals come through loud and clear", and stated that although the release "wasn't as fun as the [studio] albums", it was made for appeal from the band's "ridiculous sound, boundless energy, and catchy songs". Eleanor Goodman of TeamRock called the album "an uplifting burst of energy that's most welcome in these bleak midwinter times", only criticising the silent gaps between tracks, as well as the removal of some songs from the band's debut album.

Hannah Evans of The Guardian praised the band's performance, stating that the girls "prove they’re no gimmick but a metal phenomenon on a mission". She further described the "slick dance routines and the blending of every genre from trap to bubblegum pop" as complementary to the venue and production budget.

== Commercial performance ==
The video album release of Live at Wembley charted at number one on the Oricon DVD chart and number two on the Oricon Blu-ray chart for the week 5 December 2016, with first-week sales of 14,000 and 36,000 copies, respectively; the former became the band's first number-one ranking on the chart. The live album release of Live at Wembley managed to peak at number five on the Oricon album chart for the week 9 January 2017, and peaked at number five on the Billboard Top Albums chart and number eight on the Billboard Hot Albums chart for the week 9 January 2017, with sales to date of 9,913 copies.

== Track listing ==
Live album
| No. | Title | Writer(s) | Length |
|---|---|---|---|
| 1. | "Babymetal Death" | Kitsune of Metal God | 6:46 |
| 2. | "Awadama Fever" | Mk-metal; Kxbxmetal; Takeshi Ueda | 4:19 |
| 3. | "Yava!" | Nakametal; Mk-metal; Kxbxmetal; Norimetal | 3:54 |
| 4. | "GJ!" | Nakata Caos; Yuyoyuppe | 3:01 |
| 5. | "Doki Doki ☆ Morning" | Nakametal; Norizō; Motonari Murakawa | 3:54 |
| 6. | "Meta Taro" | Kxbxmetal; Ryu-metal | 4:18 |
| 7. | "Amore" | Norimetal; Mk-metal; Kxbxmetal | 5:32 |
| 8. | "Megitsune" | Mk-metal; Norimetal | 5:43 |
| 9. | "Karate" | Yuyoyuppe | 4:21 |
| 10. | "Ijime, Dame, Zettai" | Nakametal; Tsubometal; Kxbxmetal; Takemetal | 7:03 |
| 11. | "Gimme Chocolate!!" | Mk-metal; Kxbxmetal; Ueda | 5:14 |
| 12. | "The One" (English ver.) | Kitsune of Metal God; Kxbxmetal; Mish-Mosh | 10:21 |
| 13. | "Road of Resistance" | Kitsune of Metal God; Mk-metal; Kxbxmetal; Mish-Mosh; Norimetal; Kyt-metal | 12:52 |
| Total length: | | | 77:18 |

Video album
| No. | Title | Writer(s) | Length |
|---|---|---|---|
| 1. | "Babymetal Death" | Kitsune of Metal God | 6:46 |
| 2. | "Awadama Fever" | Mk-metal; Kxbxmetal; Takeshi Ueda | 4:17 |
| 3. | "Iine!" | Nakata Caos; Mish-Mosh | 4:32 |
| 4. | "Yava!" | Nakametal; Mk-metal; Kxbxmetal; Norimetal | 3:58 |
| 5. | "Akatsuki" | Nakametal; Tsubometal | 7:27 |
| 6. | "GJ!" | Nakata Caos; Yuyoyuppe | 3:01 |
| 7. | "Catch Me If You Can" | Edometal; Narasaki | 5:56 |
| 8. | "Doki Doki ☆ Morning" | Nakametal; Norizō; Murakawa | 3:54 |
| 9. | "Meta Taro" | Kxbxmetal; Ryu-metal | 4:22 |
| 10. | "Song 4" | Black Babymetal | 7:08 |
| 11. | "Amore" | Norimetal; Mk-metal; Kxbxmetal | 5:32 |
| 12. | "Megitsune" | Mk-metal; Norimetal | 5:43 |
| 13. | "Karate" | Yuyoyuppe | 4:21 |
| 14. | "Ijime, Dame, Zettai" | Nakametal; Tsubometal; Kxbxmetal; Takemetal | 7:03 |
| 15. | "Gimme Chocolate!!" | Mk-metal; Kxbxmetal; Ueda | 5:14 |
| 16. | "The One" (English ver.) | Kitsune of Metal God; Kxbxmetal; Mish-Mosh | 10:21 |
| 17. | "Road of Resistance" | Kitsune of Metal God; Mk-metal; Kxbxmetal; Mish-Mosh; Norimetal; Kyt-metal | 12:52 |
| Total length: | | | 103:19 |

Notes

- The 2-CD audio version included with "The One" limited edition is different from the live album, as it splits the performance between tracks 9 and 10 of the Blu-ray release and does not remove any songs.
- The vinyl format includes all 17 songs from the video album.

== Personnel ==
Credits adapted from Live at Wembley: Babymetal World Tour 2016 Kicks Off at The SSE Arena, Wembley booklet.

- Suzuka Nakamoto (Su-metal) – lead vocals
- Yui Mizuno (Yuimetal) – lead and background vocals
- Moa Kikuchi (Moametal) – lead and background vocals
- Tue Madsen – mixing
- Tucky (Parasight Mastering) – mastering
- Dana (Distortion) Yavin – photography

== Charts ==
| Chart (2016–2021) | Peak position |
|---|---|
| Japanese Albums (Oricon) | 5 |
| Japanese DVD (Oricon) | 1 |
| Japanese Music DVD (Oricon) | 1 |
| Japanese Blu-ray (Oricon) | 2 |
| Japanese Music Blu-ray (Oricon) | 1 |
| Japanese Albums (Billboard) | 5 |

== Release history ==
| Region | Date | Format | Label | Edition(s) | Catalog | Ref. |
|---|---|---|---|---|---|---|
| Japan | 23 November 2016 | Blu-ray, CD | BMD Fox Records; Amuse, Inc. | "The One" limited | ONEB-0007; ONEC-0003; ONEC-0004 | |
| Japan | 23 November 2016 | DVD; Blu-ray | BMD Fox Records; Toy's Factory; Amuse, Inc. | Video | TFBQ−18184; TFXQ−78140 | |
| United Kingdom | 9 December 2016 | CD | earMusic | Live album (13 tracks) | EMU0211680 | |
| Japan | 28 December 2016 | CD | BMD Fox Records; Toy's Factory; Amuse, Inc. | Live album (13 tracks) | TFCC-86581 | |
| Japan | 28 December 2016 | Digital download | Amuse, Inc. | Live album (13 tracks) | —N/a | |
| United Kingdom | 30 December 2016 | Digital download | earMusic | Live album (13 tracks) | —N/a | |
| Japan | 30 December 2016 | Streaming | Amuse, Inc. | Live album (13 tracks) | —N/a | |
| Taiwan | 30 December 2016 | Streaming | Amuse, Inc. | Live album (13 tracks) | —N/a | |
| Hong Kong | 30 December 2016 | Streaming | Amuse, Inc. | Live album (13 tracks) | —N/a | |
| Singapore | 30 December 2016 | Streaming | Amuse, Inc. | Live album (13 tracks) | —N/a | |
| Malaysia | 30 December 2016 | Streaming | Amuse, Inc. | Live album (13 tracks) | —N/a | |
| Worldwide | 12 April 2017 | Digital download; streaming | Amuse, Inc. | Video | —N/a | |
| Japan | 8 September 2021 | LP | BMD Fox Records; Toy's Factory; Amuse, Inc. | Live album (17 tracks) | TFJC-38078/80 | |
