= F.Hero =

Thai rapper (born 1982)

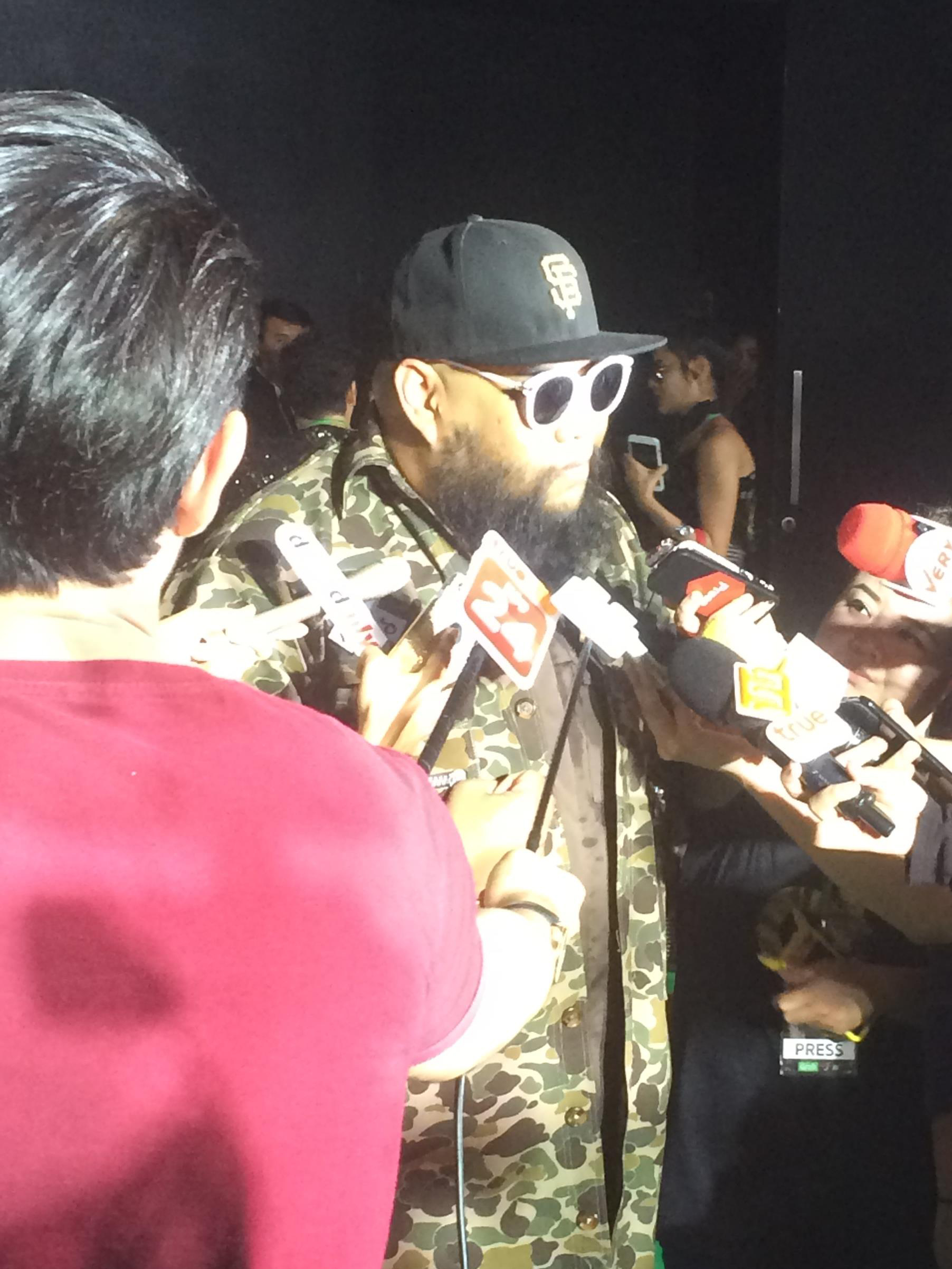
- F.Hero in March 2017

Background information
- Also known as: Fakking Hero
- Born: Nattawut Srimok; 22 September 1982 (age 44); Mae Sai, Thailand
- Genre: Hip-hop
- Occupations: Rapper; songwriter; actor
- Instrument: Vocals
- Years active: 2003–present
- Label: High Cloud Entertainment

Nattawut Srimok (Thai: ณัฐวุฒิ ศรีหมอก; born 22 September 1982), better known as F.Hero (stylized in all caps) and formerly Fakking Hero (ฟักกลิ้ง ฮีโร่), is a Thai rapper, songwriter, and actor.

== Early life ==
Nattawut Srimok was born in Mae Sai on 22 September 1982. His parents separated when he was young. He completed his primary education at Darunrat Wittaya School and secondary education at MaeSaiPrasitsart School before studying law at Ramkhamhaeng University.

== Career ==
Nattawut was a member of Sing Nuer Suer Tai and Gancore Club before starting a solo career and moving to the record label High Cloud Entertainment, which he founded.

On 27 June 2019, F.Hero was featured on the Babymetal single "Pa Pa Ya!!", which was released before their concert at Yokohama Arena the same day. The video, released on 1 July, featured footage from their concert in Yokohama. On 14 March 2024, F.Hero released another standalone single with Babymetal entitled "Leave It All Behind", which also features Bodyslam.

In February 2025, F.Hero released the single "Kularb", featuring Kantong Tungngern and Saran, which reached No. 1 on the Official Thailand Chart and spent 16 weeks there. He also co-performed on the official theme song of the 2025 SEA Games "1%" alongside Violette Wautier in the Thai version.

== Personal life ==
Nattawut began dating Belle Yupaporn in April 2013, and their daughter was born on 26 February 2015. They were married in a small impromptu ceremony on 30 November 2017 after he proposed to her at a cinema.

== Discography ==
=== Studio albums ===
- Sing Nuer Suer Tai II (2005)
- Gancore Club 2 (2007)
- Into the New Era (2019)

Soundtrack work

- สหายร่วมชาติ (2006)
- ราตรีสวัสดิ์ (ร่วมร้องกับ ธีร์ ไชยเดช) (2009)
- เซนติเมตร ("Centimetres") (2015)
- ชูใจ (2015)
- สวย ("Beautiful Girl") feat. สุรชัย สมบัติเจริญ [BOTCASH Remix] (2016)
- พลังแสงอาทิตย์ "feat. คิว Flure" (2016)
- #เผ็ช (ft. Botcash) (2016)
- "Once in a Lifetime" feat. Gavin.D (2018)
- ยาว (สู้ติละ) feat. VKL & JJAZZSPER (2019)
