= Legend S: Baptism XX =

2018 live video album by Babymetal

- Blu-ray cover

Live album and video by Babymetal
- Released: August 1, 2018 (video); September 8, 2021 (live album)
- Recorded: December 2, 2017; December 3, 2017
- Venue: Hiroshima Green Arena
- Genre: Kawaii metal; J-pop; heavy metal
- Length: 106:12
- Language: Japanese; English
- Label: BMD Fox; Toy's Factory; Amuse
- Director: Riki Tanaka
- Producer: Kobametal

Babymetal album chronology
| Live at Tokyo Dome (2021) | Legend S: Baptism XX (2021) | Live at the Forum (2021) |

Babymetal video chronology
| Live at Tokyo Dome (2017) | Legend S: Baptism XX (2018) | Live at the Forum (2020) |

Music video
- Babymetal "No Rain, No Rainbow" (Live) on YouTube

Legend S: Baptism XX is the seventh live video album by Japanese heavy metal band Babymetal, released in Japan on August 1, 2018, through BMD Fox Records and Toy's Factory. It contains footage from the shows of the same name at Hiroshima Green Arena in December 2017.

== Background ==
Two shows occurring after the Big Fox Festival in Japan tour, titled Legend "S" Baptism XX, (Note: Legend "S" Baptism XX (LEGEND - S - 洗礼の儀 -, LEGEND - S - Senrei no Gi -; "Legend - S - Ceremony of Baptism -")) subtitled Metal Resistance Episode VI, were teased on October 14, 2017, and confirmed the following day, at the conclusion of the Big Fox Festival in Japan leg; taking place on December 2 and 3, 2017, the shows commemorated the twentieth birthday of Suzuka Nakamoto, at her place of origin in Hiroshima, at the Hiroshima Green Arena. When asked about the shows, Su-metal stated, "I went into this performance thinking about how proud I am to have been born and raised in Hiroshima, and I wanted to show that I have learned and gained so much from past precious experiences. During this performance, I also wanted to express what kind of adult I would like to become in future." Concerning the performance taking place in her birth city, she stated her desire to feel confident enough to have seen her growth as an artist, calling the goal of performing there "unbelievable", and being grateful for fans to be able to visit iconic places in Hiroshima as well.

Attendees to the show were required to wear a three-piece outfit, consisting of a mask, a cape, and a necklace. A total of 14,000 were in the audience for both days, with five times as many who applied for tickets to the shows, and some without tickets reportedly listened in from outside the venue. On the first show date (which was opened exclusive to "The One" fanclub members), the band announced that Mizuno was sick and would not be performing at the shows (a postponement was considered initially).

The show would later be streamed on Wowow Prime on March 31, 2018. A trailer for the broadcast was posted on March 7, 2018.

The album was first announced on April 1, 2018, referred to as "Fox Day" (the same release day as Metal Resistance) by the band. The initial announcement was exclusively for "The One" members with box set release including video and audio of the performances. A trailer for the set was uploaded on April 22, 2018, which is also when the box set was made available for pre-order.

On June 1, 2018, a live clip of "No Rain, No Rainbow" was posted on the band's official YouTube channel, with the announcement of a DVD and Blu-ray release for general sale and purchase starting August 1, 2018, in Japan. On August 23, 2018, a digital version was announced for release on the following day.

On September 8, 2021, the album had a vinyl release in commemoration of the band's tenth anniversary.

== Content ==
The show begins with an introductory video with narration explaining that the people of Earth are in despair, but a new goddess would restore hope in the year 20XX. The concert begins as Su-metal steps onto a pedestal with six fox heads, which is moved toward the center stage, at which point the band performs "In the Name Of". Afterwards, Moametal joins her on the stage as they play through various songs, including "Ijime, Dame, Zettai", "Gimme Chocolate!!", and "Doki Doki ☆ Morning". During "Akatsuki", Su-metal is shown fighting a shadow resembling her. When Su-metal is performing "No Rain, No Rainbow", there is a live piano, with string and band accompaniment (Although most likely performers playing to a backing track). "Headbangeeeeerrrrr!!!!!" has its lyrics modified to reflect Su-metal's twentieth birthday commemoration. Su-metal is then "ritually sacrificed" during the performance of "Babymetal Death", only to be reincarnated into a goddess. The band concludes the show by performing the English version of "The One". To close off the show, the members appear to vanish through a magical gate, dressed in gold costumes. This was also the first concert without a Kami Band solo intro who were put in black robes in front of a black backgrounds, as if to make them not as noticeable. This may have been done to keep the attention on the girls since they are the focus of the show. Legend S was also guitarist Mikio Fujioka's last performance with Babymetal, who died on January 5, 2018, as a result of injuries sustained from a fall off of an observation tower days before. His last live performance was on December 26 at a Birthday concert for Takayoshi Ohmura with fellow Kami band members Boh and Hideki along with the band Gacharic Spin.

== Critical reception ==
Paul Travers of Kerrang! positively reviewed the performance. Rating the shows five out of five "K"s, he called the intro song "In the Name Of" "an intro that leaves any band you can name in the dust". He further commented that although the girls were the "focal point" of the show, it would fail without the accompanying Kami Band's "turbo-charged engine". The audience participation was also praised, from their silence between songs to their jumps and shouts in the middle of certain songs. He highlighted "No Rain, No Rainbow" for having a "Slash-worthy solo", but called the performances of "Babymetal Death" and "The One" "the best […] saved until the last", and concluded that the shows "surpass anything even the wildest imagination could have thought up".

== Commercial performance ==
Legend S: Baptism XX charted at number four on the Oricon DVD chart for the week August 13, 2018, with first-week sales of 3,594 copies, and peaked at number one on the Oricon Blu-ray chart the same week, with first-week sales of 19,604 copies; the latter performance marked the band's fourth number one Blu-ray release, breaking the tie for the girl group with the fourth-most number-one albums on the chart, surpassing AKB48 and Nana Mizuki (three each), and behind Perfume (six), Namie Amuro (five), and Nogizaka46 (five). The release also peaked at number two and one on the DVD and Blu-ray music video charts, respectively, becoming the band's fifth release to do so for the latter.

== Track listing ==
| No. | Title | Writer(s) | Length |
|---|---|---|---|
| 1. | "In the Name Of" | Kitsune of Metal God | 12:09 |
| 2. | "Ijime, Dame, Zettai" (イジメ、ダメ、ゼッタイ) | Nakametal; Tsubometal; Kxbxmetal; Takemetal | 5:34 |
| 3. | "Gimme Chocolate!!" (ギミチョコ！！) | Mk-metal; Kxbxmetal; Takeshi Ueda | 3:56 |
| 4. | "Doki Doki ☆ Morning" (ド・キ・ド・キ☆モーニング) | Nakametal; Norizō; Motonari Murakawa | 3:56 |
| 5. | "Akatsuki" (紅月 -アカツキ-) | Nakametal; Tsubometal | 6:55 |
| 6. | "GJ!" | Nakata Caos; Yuyoyuppe | 3:25 |
| 7. | "Syncopation" (シンコペーション) | Norimetal; Kxbxmetal | 4:38 |
| 8. | "Meta Taro" (META! メタ太郎) | Kxbxmetal; Ryu-metal | 5:24 |
| 9. | "No Rain, No Rainbow" | Yoshifu-metal; Mk-metal; Nakametal | 6:55 |
| 10. | "Song 4" (4の歌) | Black Babymetal | 4:31 |
| 11. | "Megitsune" (メギツネ) | Mk-metal; Norimetal | 6:21 |
| 12. | "Karate" | Yuyoyuppe | 4:34 |
| 13. | "Road of Resistance" | Kitsune of Metal God; Mk-metal; Kxbxmetal; Mish-Mosh; Norimetal; Kyt-metal | 7:06 |
| 14. | "Headbangeeeeerrrrr!!!!!" (ヘドバンギャー！！) | Edometal; Nakametal; Narasaki | 5:06 |
| 15. | "Babymetal Death" | Kitsune of Metal God | 8:02 |
| 16. | "The One" (English ver.) | Kitsune of Metal God; Kxbxmetal; Mish-Mosh | 17:40 |
| Total length: | | | 106:12 |

Notes

- "The One" is partially performed with the "Unfinished ver." instrumental.
- "The One" limited edition includes a 2-CD audio release, splitting the performance between tracks 8 and 9.

== Personnel ==
Credits adapted from Legend S: Baptism XX booklet.

- Suzuka Nakamoto (Su-metal) – lead vocals
- Moa Kikuchi (Moametal) – lead and background vocals
- Tue Madsen – mixing
- Tucky (Parasight Mastering) – mastering
- Riki Tanaka – director
- Mikio Fujioka - Guitar (Last concert with Babymetal before his death)
- BOH - Bass
- Hideki Aoyama - Drums
- Takayoshi Ohmura - Guitar

== Charts ==
=== Weekly charts ===
| Chart (2018–2021) | Peak position |
|---|---|
| Japanese Albums (Oricon) | 221 |
| Japanese DVD (Oricon) | 4 |
| Japanese Music DVD (Oricon) | 2 |
| Japanese Blu-ray (Oricon) | 1 |
| Japanese Music Blu-ray (Oricon) | 1 |

=== Daily charts ===
| Chart (2018) | Peak position |
|---|---|
| Japanese DVD (Oricon) | 3 |
| Japanese Music DVD (Oricon) | 2 |
| Japanese Blu-ray (Oricon) | 1 |

== Release history ==
| Region | Date | Format | Label | Edition(s) | Catalog | Ref. |
|---|---|---|---|---|---|---|
| Japan | August 1, 2018 | Blu-ray, CD | BMD Fox Records; Amuse, Inc. | "The One" limited box set | ONEB-0016 | |
| Japan | August 1, 2018 | DVD; Blu-ray | BMD Fox Records; Toy's Factory; Amuse, Inc. | Standard video | TFBQ-18204; TFXQ-78162 | |
| Japan | August 24, 2018 | Digital download | Amuse, Inc. | Standard video | —N/a | |
| Germany | August 24, 2018 | Digital download | Amuse, Inc. | Standard video | —N/a | |
| France | August 24, 2018 | Digital download | Amuse, Inc. | Standard video | —N/a | |
| Italy | August 24, 2018 | Digital download | Amuse, Inc. | Standard video | —N/a | |
| Netherlands | August 24, 2018 | Digital download | Amuse, Inc. | Standard video | —N/a | |
| Spain | August 24, 2018 | Digital download | Amuse, Inc. | Standard video | —N/a | |
| United Kingdom | August 24, 2018 | Digital download | Amuse, Inc. | Standard video | —N/a | |
| United States | October 4, 2018 | Digital download | Cooking Vinyl | Standard video | —N/a | |
| Worldwide | October 4, 2018 | Streaming | The Orchard Entertainment | Standard video | —N/a | |
| Japan | September 8, 2021 | LP | BMD Fox Records; Toy's Factory; Amuse, Inc. | Live album | TFJC-38086/8 | |
