= Starlight (Babymetal song) =

Single by Babymetal

from the album Metal Galaxy
- Language: Japanese; English
- Released: October 19, 2018
- Genre: Kawaii metal; djent
- Length: 3:37
- Label: Amuse, Inc.; Toy's Factory
- Composers: Megmetal; Metal Skywalker
- Lyricist: Metal Saints
- Producer: Kobametal

Babymetal singles chronology
"Distortion" (2018)	"Starlight" (2018)	"Elevator Girl" (2019)

Music video
- "Starlight" on YouTube

"Starlight" is a song by Japanese heavy metal band Babymetal. It was first released as a digital single on October 19, 2018.

== Background and release ==
"Starlight" was first teased on October 4, 2018, as part of a trailer for Babymetal's first graphic novel, Apocrypha: The Legend of Babymetal (2018). The song was briefly made available on the band's official YouTube channel on October 18, 2018 before being made unavailable. The song was officially released the following day, along with the official announcement of Yui Mizuno's departure from the band.

Su-metal has stated she enjoys singing the high parts in the middle of the track, linked to the choreography.

It is widely speculated by fans that the song is meant to be a tribute to Mikio Fujioka, a former live guitarist for the band who died earlier that same year.

== Composition ==
"Starlight" was described as "pretty djenty" by Greg Kennelty of Metal Injection. Scott Munro of Metal Hammer commented that the song "starts off slowly but soon kicks into a frantic pace, complete with catchy chorus, thundering drums and slabs of crunching guitars", while Billboard called it a "ferocious and heavy melody that explores their signature hybrid of metal riffs and infectious vocal attacks".

== Reception ==
"Starlight" debuted at number 41 on the Billboard Japan Hot 100 for the week of October 29, 2018, with 1,150 first-week equivalent units. The following week, the song rose to number 24, with 1,637 equivalent units. Due to being released exclusively in a digital format, the song charted at number nine on the Oricon Digital Singles chart for the week October 28, 2018, with first-week downloads of 8,666 copies. In the United States, "Starlight" debuted at number seventeen and four on the Billboard World Hard Rock Songs and Billboard World Digital Songs charts, respectively, for the week November 3, 2018.

== Music video ==
A music video was released to the official Babymetal YouTube channel on October 19, 2018. As described by Marina Pedrosa, of Billboard, the video representing "another step in the group's expanding storyline about an unknown dark side and the legend of seven metal spirits, The Chosen Seven", depicting a "post-apocalyptical scene, the band's members are seen running, dancing and screaming on a desert mountain in between flashy and kaleidoscopic visuals." However, the characters seen in the video are not band members. They are actors potentially representing Chosen 7 characters. At the very end of the video, Sumetal and Moametal do make a brief appearance signifying the continuation of Babymetal with these two as the core.

== Track listing ==
Digital download

- "Starlight" – 3:37

== Charts ==
Chart (2018)	Peak position
Japan (Billboard)	24
Japan Download Songs (Billboard)	6
Japan Digital Singles (Oricon)	9
US Hard Rock Digital Songs (Billboard)	17
US World Digital Songs (Billboard)	4

== Release history ==
Region	Date	Format	Label	Ref.
Japan	October 19, 2018	Digital download	Amuse, Inc.; Toy's Factory	
Europe	October 19, 2018	Digital download	earMusic	
Australia	October 19, 2018	Digital download	Babymetal Records; Cooking Vinyl	
Canada	October 19, 2018	Digital download	Babymetal Records; Cooking Vinyl	
Hong Kong	October 19, 2018	Digital download	Babymetal Records; Cooking Vinyl	
Indonesia	October 19, 2018	Digital download	Babymetal Records; Cooking Vinyl	
Latin America and the Caribbean	October 19, 2018	Digital download	Babymetal Records; Cooking Vinyl	
Mexico	October 19, 2018	Digital download	Babymetal Records; Cooking Vinyl	
Philippines	October 19, 2018	Digital download	Babymetal Records; Cooking Vinyl	
South Africa	October 19, 2018	Digital download	Babymetal Records; Cooking Vinyl	
South Korea	October 19, 2018	Digital download	Babymetal Records; Cooking Vinyl	
United States	October 19, 2018	Digital download	Babymetal Records; Cooking Vinyl	
Vietnam	October 19, 2018	Digital download	Babymetal Records; Cooking Vinyl	
