= Distortion (Babymetal song) =

- Digital single cover

Single by Babymetal

from the album Metal Galaxy
- Language: Japanese; English
- Released: May 8, 2018
- Genre: Metalcore
- Length: 3:05
- Label: BMD Fox; Toy's Factory; Amuse
- Composer: Takemetal
- Lyricists: Takemetal; Dk-metal
- Producers: Kobametal; Megmetal (arrangement)

Babymetal singles chronology
"Karate" (2016)	"Distortion" (2018)	"Starlight" (2018)

Music video
- "Distortion" on YouTube

"Distortion" is a song by Japanese heavy metal band Babymetal. First released as a digital single on May 8, 2018, to promote the band's Babymetal World Tour 2018, the song later had a physical 12-inch release on Record Store Day on November 23, 2018, by BMD Fox Records, earMusic, and Babymetal Records.

== Background and release ==
On February 27, 2018, Babymetal announced the Babymetal World Tour 2018. On April 1, 2018, Babymetal uploaded a teaser for Metal Resistance Episode VII, titled "The Revelation", which hinted the presence of a dark side composed of "seven metal spirits". The spirits mentioned were seen in the music video for "Distortion" uploaded on May 7, 2018, representing the Apocrypha of Babymetal, and the song was distributed to the iTunes Store, Apple Music, Spotify, and other music distribution services the following day. It was the band's first release since the death of Kami Band guitarist Mikio Fujioka on January 5, 2018.

On September 28, 2018, Babymetal announced a 12-inch vinyl single that would be released worldwide on Record Store Day on November 23, 2018. The single included a live performance of the song at Download Festival as a B-side, and a Japanese limited edition included a jacket cover different from that released in other regions.

Moametal favors the beginning of the song for "lifting [her] up", as well as the interlude for providing a call and response with the audience.

The song was re-released as part of the band's album Metal Galaxy with additional vocals from Arch Enemy frontwoman Alissa White-Gluz.

== Composition ==
"Distortion" is a speed metal tune composed of "screeching, pummeling guitars", "metalcore-like chug-riffs", and a catchy chorus, quickly switching between "heavy" and "sugary", and resulting in a "darker", more mature song compared to previous music released by the band.

== Reception ==
"Distortion" debuted at number six on the Billboard Japan Hot 100 for the week of May 21, 2018. Due to being released exclusively in a digital format, the song charted at number two on the Oricon Digital Singles chart for the week May 21, 2018, with first-week downloads of 16,468 copies. In the United States, "Distortion" debuted at number two on the Billboard World Digital Songs chart for the week May 19, 2018.

Following the physical release of "Distortion", the song charted at number 42 on the Oricon Singles chart for the week of December 3, 2018, with first-week sales of 1,791 copies.

== Music video ==
The music video was released on May 7, 2018. The video features the "unrevealed Dark Side, the Apocrypha" of the lore of the Metal Resistance, featuring the Chosen Seven hinted in the teaser, in a world where "power is distorted through time and space." A warrior is shown fighting against "scary-looking figures cloaked in shadows" and fighting the darkness. The members of Babymetal do not appear in the video.

== Live performances ==
"Distortion" was first performed live on the first tour date of the band's Babymetal World Tour 2018 at the Uptown Theater in Kansas City, Missouri, on May 8, 2018, along with the premiere of other new songs. Notably, Yuimetal was absent from the entire show, which was not addressed prior to the performance. A live performance of the song at Download Festival 2018 was uploaded to YouTube on September 28, 2018, which was later released in audio form as a B-side to the vinyl single.

== Track listings and formats ==
Digital download

- "Distortion" – 3:05

12-inch single

- A. "Distortion"
- B. "Distortion" (live at Download Festival 2018)

== Charts ==
Chart performance for "Distortion"
Chart (2018)	Peak position
Japan Billboard Hot 100	6
Japan (Oricon)	42
Japan Digital Singles (Oricon)	2
UK Physical Singles (OCC)	26
US World Digital Song Sales (Billboard)	2

== Release history ==
Region	Date	Format	Label	Editions
Japan	May 8, 2018	Digital download	Amuse, Inc.; Toy's Factory	Standard
Europe	May 8, 2018	Digital download	earMusic	Standard
Worldwide	May 8, 2018	Digital download	Babymetal Records; Cooking Vinyl	Standard
Japan	November 23, 2018	12"	BMD Fox Records; Toy's Factory; Amuse, Inc.	Limited
United Kingdom	November 23, 2018	12"	earMusic	Limited
Canada	November 23, 2018	12"	Babymetal Records; Cooking Vinyl	Limited
United States	November 23, 2018	12"	Babymetal Records; Cooking Vinyl	Limited
