= Fafo =

Fafo or FAFO may refer to:

- Fafo Foundation, a Norwegian research institute
- "fafo", a 2021 song by Zack Fox
- "F.A.F.O", a 2023 song by @onefive from Classy Crush
- "Fuck/Fool Around and Find Out", a military slang term
