= @onefive =

Japanese girl group

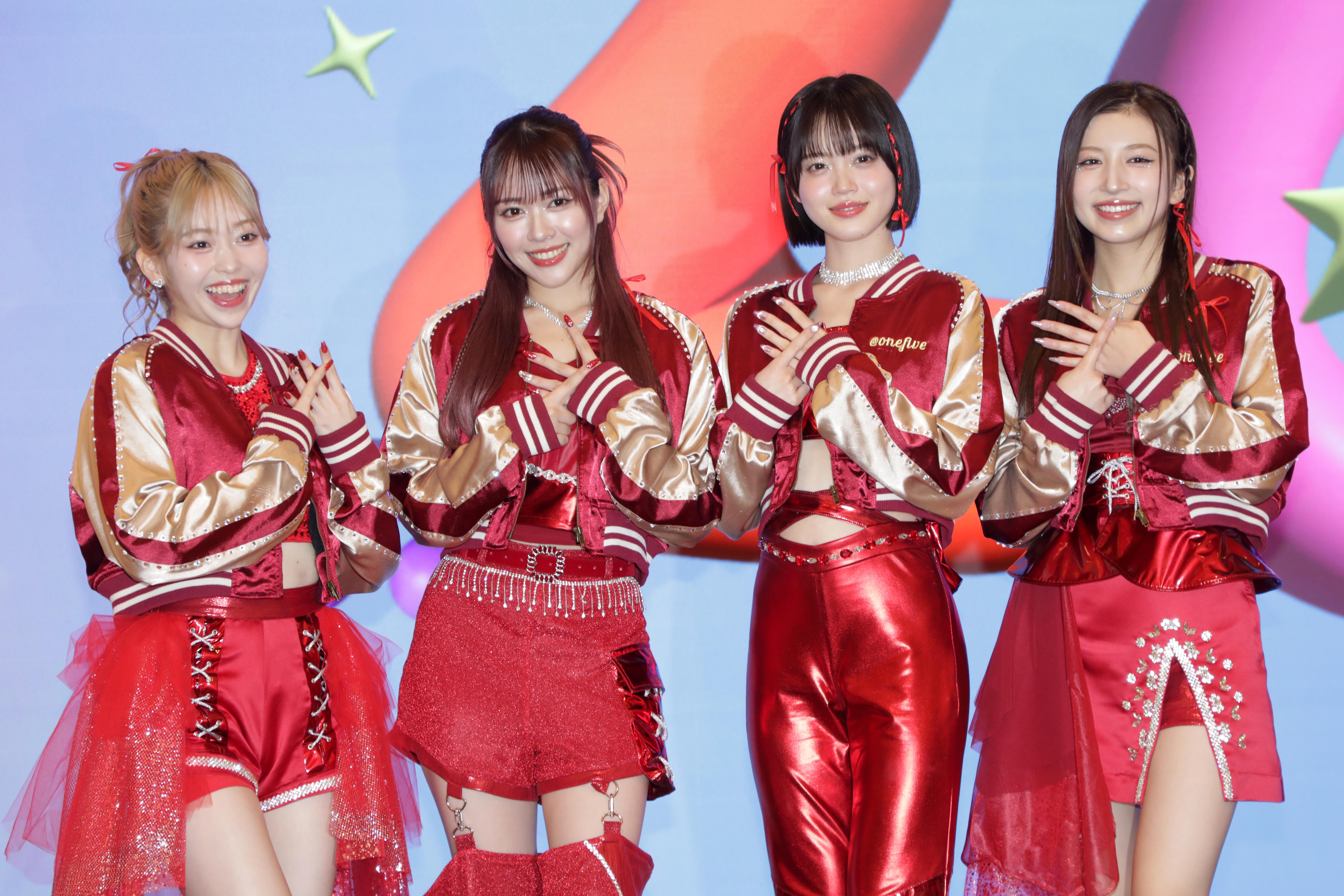
- @onefive in Taiwan in December 2024; From left to right: Momo, Kano, Soyo, Gumi

Background information
- Origin: Japan
- Genres: J-pop; hip-hop; electropop
- Years active: 2019–present
- Labels: Amuse Inc. (2019–2022); Avex Trax (2022–present)
- Spinoff of: Sakura Gakuin
- Members: Kano Fujihira; Soyoka Yoshida; Tsugumi Aritomo; Momoe Mori
- Website: onefive-web.jp
- Official Logo

@onefive (Japanese: ワンファイブ, Hepburn: Wanfaibu) is a Japanese girl group consisting of Kano Fujihira, Soyoka Yoshida, Tsugumi Aritomo, and Momoe Mori. It was formed in 2019, when the members were 15 years old. The group is active internationally in music, modeling, acting, and other endeavors. @onefive describes itself as a "new species of idol" (新種のアイドル, shinshu no aidoru) that focuses on live performance skills and musicality while also possessing the cuteness and positive energy of traditional Japanese idols. The members actively participate in various aspects of the creative process. With its "Japanese Classy Crush" concept, the group cherishes the culture of Japan while crushing stereotypes. @onefive is represented by the talent agency Amuse Inc. and is signed with the record label Avex Trax.

== Name ==
The name @onefive was devised by the members in their third year of middle school. It was chosen because they were 15 years old at the time of formation, and because it can be pronounced in Japanese as ichi-go (lit. 'one-five'), referring to the concept of ichi-go ichi-e, which the members value. The "@" symbol, which is silent, was included in the name to mean "from us" and "now from this place". Fans of @onefive are collectively referred to as @fifth.

== History ==
=== 2019–2021: Formation, Mada Minu Sekai, and BBB ===
@onefive was formed in October 2019 by four active members of the Japanese idol group Sakura Gakuin, who had been working in the entertainment industry since childhood: Kano Fujihira, Soyoka Yoshida, Tsugumi Aritomo, and Momoe Mori. They adopted the stage names Kano, Soyo, Gumi, and Momo for @onefive, respectively. Fujihira was also active as one of the three rotating "Avengers" support dancers for the kawaii metal band Babymetal, which originated as a sub-unit of Sakura Gakuin. On October 15, 2019, the group created social media accounts on Twitter, Instagram, and YouTube, but the identities of its members were kept secret. On October 19, 2019, while the members were still in Sakura Gakuin, their identities were revealed during the Sakura Gakuin Festival 2019 at the Kanagawa Arts Theatre. During the encore of the show, after performing as members of Sakura Gakuin, they performed their debut single "Pinky Promise" as @onefive for the first time. The choreography for the single was created by Mikiko. "Pinky Promise" was released as a digital single on the following day, October 20, 2019, officially marking @onefive's debut. Shortly after its formation, the group was unable to perform in-person events due to the COVID-19 pandemic, relying instead on an online presence to hold virtual events. In May 2020, the members began a project in which they collaboratively produced merchandise with their fans through social media.

@onefive's first CD single, "Mada Minu Sekai" (まだ見ぬ世界), was released on June 24, 2020. The music video for the title track was recorded by the members at their own homes during the pandemic. The group also collaborated with Adobe on a photo collage contest for the single. On June 25, 2020, the first issue of the youth culture magazine Ite by Ohta Publishing featured @onefive on its cover, wearing the outfits for "Mada Minu Sekai". On June 29, 2020, a four-episode radio special hosted by the members called @onefive's Mada Minu Talk (@onefiveのまだ見ぬトーク) began on JFN Park. A live-streamed performance was held on July 19, 2020, to commemorate the release of the CD single.

On August 30, 2020, the four members officially graduated from Sakura Gakuin with a live-streamed Sakura Gakuin concert titled The Road to Graduation 2019 Final. Fujihira and Yoshida had recorded five albums in total with Sakura Gakuin, while Aritomo and Mori had recorded four. The last album on which they appeared, Sakura Gakuin 2019 Nendo: Story, was released on March 3, 2020, and included their graduation song, "Crossroad".

In September 2020, @onefive collaborated with the Japanese glass manufacturer Hario for the accessories worn as part of the outfits for "Shizuku".

The concert @onefive Online Live: Blue Winter 2020 took place on December 22, 2020. It was streamed without an in-person audience due to the ongoing pandemic. The members chose to perform a vocal cover of "Meri Kuri" by BoA, which was accompanied by member Yoshida playing the piano, as well as a dance to "Snow White Castle" by Yūki Tsujimura.

In January 2021, the group collaborated with the Japanese fashion brand Apres Jour for the outfits worn in the music video for the song "BBB". The CD single "BBB" was released on March 3, 2021.

On November 1, 2021, "Just for You" was featured in the Christmas commercial of the Japanese jewelry brand The Kiss.

On November 24, 2021, the digital single "Underground" was released, which marked the first time that the members of @onefive created their own choreography. They were also deeply involved in the production process of the music video, sharing their ideas on hairstyles, makeup, outfits, visuals, and cuts. The participation of the members in "Underground" was documented, with an emphasis on the choreography, in a four-part documentary series released on YouTube, titled Their Underground (彼女たちのUnderground, Kanojo-tachi no Underground).

=== 2022: 1518, OshiBudō TV drama, and major label debut ===
On February 2, 2022, @onefive released its first studio album, titled 1518, and pronounced ichi-go ichi-e. The "18" in the title represented the age that the members would be turning in the year of the album's release. The title track "1518" marked the first time that the members wrote their own lyrics. They also choreographed the entire song. The other songs on the album, though not written by the members, also contain their thoughts and opinions. The music video for "Lalala Lucky" was produced in collaboration with students of N High School and in cooperation with Adobe. "Lalala Lucky" was also featured in a web commercial for the Japanese hair dye brand Beautylabo. The members co-choreographed "Lalala Lucky" with Minako "Maru" Maruyama from Elevenplay.

On February 20, 2022, as the circumstances surrounding the COVID-19 pandemic continued to change, the group was able to hold its first in-person solo concert with an audience, titled @onefive 1st Live: 1518, in Osaka at the Umeda Club Quattro. It was followed by a second concert under the same title on March 6, 2022, in Tokyo at the Shibuya Club Quattro. During the second concert, @onefive performed a dance to the song "Let Me Go" by Yūki Tsujimura, who was prominently involved in the music production of the first album. The choreography and stage lighting for the performance of the song were produced by member Fujihira. Member Yoshida also played piano renditions of @onefive's songs "Canned Coffee and Chocolate Bread" (缶コーヒーとチョコレートパン) and "Just for You". The four members choreographed "Just for You". They also decided on the design of the logo for the concerts and merchandise, and planned the setlist and outfits.

It was announced on August 16, 2022, that @onefive had been cast as members of the fictional idol group ChamJam in the live-action television drama adaptation of the manga If My Favorite Pop Idol Made It to the Budokan, I Would Die, abbreviated in Japanese as OshiBudō (推し武道). Namely, Fujihira would appear as Maki Hakata, Yoshida as Yumeri Mizumori, Aritomo as Yūka Teramoto, and Mori as Sorane Matsuyama. The drama was broadcast for 10 episodes on ABC TV and TV Asahi from October to December 2022, and featured "Miraizu" (未来図) as its theme song. The release of "Miraizu" as a digital single on November 6, 2022, marked @onefive's major label debut with Avex Trax.

The @onefive Live 2022: Spotlight concerts were held in Osaka at the Umeda Club Quattro on November 6, 2022, and in Tokyo at The Garden Hall on November 13, 2022. The members participated in planning the stage production, sharing their ideas on matters such as lighting.

=== 2023: OshiBudō film, Chance×Change, and Justice Day ===
The official fan club of @onefive was established on January 15, 2023, in the form of a subscription-based mobile application initially called @onefive Premium. It was given the name @fifth on March 3, 2023.

The concert @onefive Live 2023: Chance×Change, which was held in Tokyo at the Ex Theater Roppongi on April 9, 2023, marked the first time that the audience could sing and cheer out loud, being no longer restricted by the COVID-19 pandemic. It also coincided with the transition of the members of @onefive from high school to university, a "change" that they each elaborated on during the conversational parts of the concert.

On May 12, 2023, the live-action film adaptation of the manga If My Favorite Pop Idol Made It to the Budokan, I Would Die, abbreviated in Japanese as OshiBudō (推し武道), was released with "Chance" as its theme song. The four members of @onefive reprised their roles from the television drama. Their vocals as ChamJam from the film and television drama adaptations were included on the second disc of the two-disc album I Live For You (きみのために生きてる, Kimi no Tame ni Ikiteru), released by Pony Canyon on May 10, 2023.

The CD single "Chance×Change" was released on May 24, 2023. The music video for "Ring Donuts" featured a collaboration with Krispy Kreme Doughnuts.

On August 14, 2023, a short film was released for the song "Like A", featuring actor Taisuke Niihara and the members of @onefive. The members were involved in the production from the scriptwriting stage. The film was entered into the TikTok Toho Film Festival 2023.

The CD single "Justice Day" was released on August 23, 2023. "Like A" was featured in a commercial for the Japanese jewelry brand The Kiss on August 26, 2023.

In November 2023, @onefive was selected to be the Generation Z Leader for Amazon Fashion Japan. The members began modeling for Amazon while aiming to convey the charm of Generation Z through fashion.

November 17, 2023, marked the creation of the group's official characters, or mascots, called @chib15, pronounced chibi five. Each of the four members designed their own character: Laa the lion by Fujihira, Babu the chick by Yoshida, Zoey the fawn by Aritomo, and Mimi the rabbit by Mori.

In the final quarter of 2023, the group held two concerts under the title @onefive Live 2023: No15e Maker. The first concert, subtitled Underground, was held in Osaka at the Yogibo Meta Valley on November 25, 2023. The second concert, subtitled Overground, took place in Tokyo at the Ex Theater Roppongi on December 21, 2023. The two subtitles referred to the process of rising from the underground.

=== 2024: Classy Crush and first nationwide tour ===
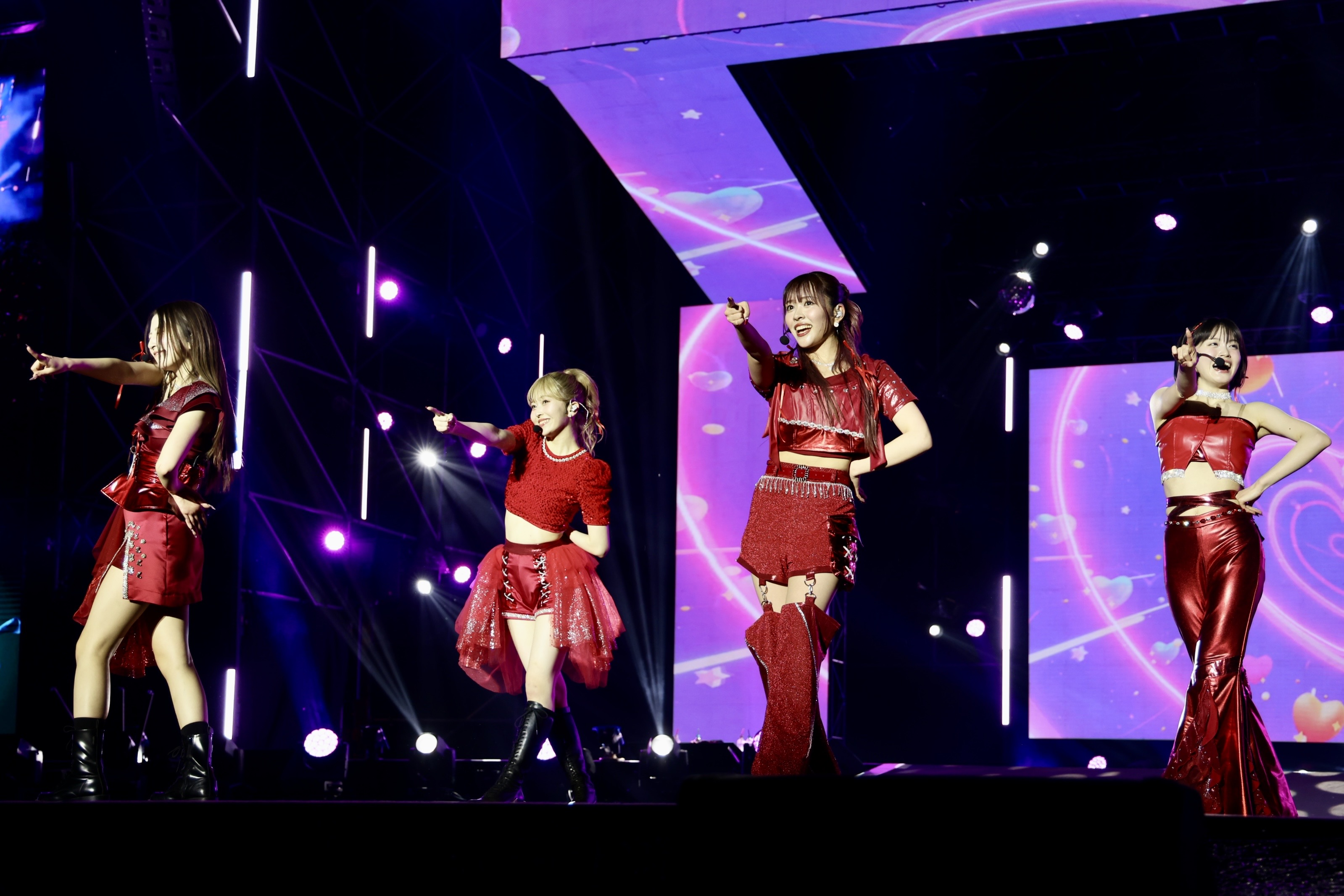
@onefive performing in Taiwan at the 2025 Tainan Hao Young New Year's Eve Party on December 31, 2024

On February 23, 2024, @onefive held a virtual party on the Japanese metaverse platform Cluster as part of the NTV Imaginarium 2023 metaverse festival, which took place from December 9, 2023, to March 3, 2024. In addition, the members created pieces of pixel art depicting their @chib15 characters for the festival, which were both physically displayed at the Museum of Contemporary Art Tokyo and virtually granted as NFTs.

The song "Mr.Gorgeous" was featured in a commercial for Amazon Prime Video on April 8, 2024.

On April 17, 2024, @onefive's second studio album and first major label album, titled Classy Crush, was released. The album contains songs that depict strong Japanese girls, including its lead song "OZGi", pronounced ojigi, which was produced with the theme of "Japanese Classy Crush". The ideas and opinions of the members strongly contributed to Classy Crush. Member Aritomo indicated that the album was more intentional in presenting the messages that they would like to convey through their music, and that they all decided on the track sequence.

The song "Love Call" was featured in a commercial for the Japanese jewelry brand The Kiss on August 8, 2024, in which the four members also appeared.

@onefive's first nationwide tour, titled @onefive Livehouse Tour 2024 "Classy Crush", took place between August 17 and September 15, 2024. Member Yoshida designed the Japanese folding fan merchandise for the tour.

The group celebrated its 5th anniversary with a concert titled 5555, held on October 19, 2024, at the Shibuya WWW X venue.

A variety series centered around the members, titled 15Vibes, premiered on TV Asahi's Logirl on November 7, 2024.

@onefive's first international performance took place in Tainan City, Taiwan, at the 2025 Tainan Hao Young New Year's Eve Party on December 31, 2024. Over 100,000 spectators were present at the time of @onefive's performance, during which the group performed "Liar Liar" for the first time, as well as a dance cover of Taiwanese singer Cyndi Wang's song "Ai Ni" (愛你).

=== 2025: More Than Kawaii and international expansion ===
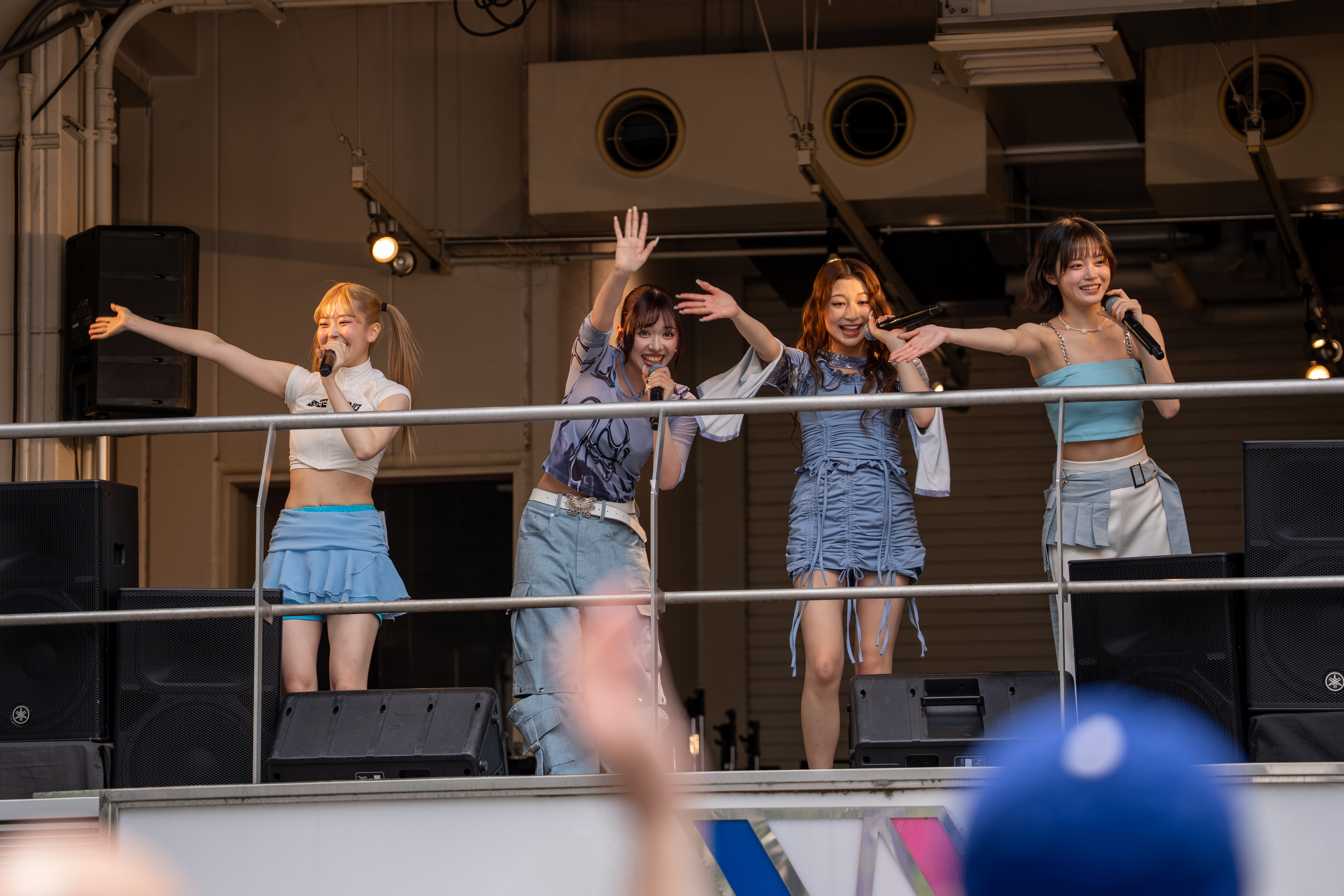
@onefive performing at Mawa Loop Osaka 2025 on May 11, 2025

In February and March 2025, the members partnered with various stores as one-day store managers to promote their upcoming spring tour, titled @onefive Tour 2025 "More Than Kawaii", which would begin on March 30. They also rewrote the lyrics of "Kono Mama ja Koware-sō" (このままじゃ壊れそう) and "Last Blue" for the tour.

The group's first extended play (EP), More Than Kawaii, was released on March 26, 2025. It was produced based on the concept that, in this world where kawaii is commonplace, @onefive will not be limited to being only kawaii. The members were deeply involved in the production of the songs from scratch, putting their real thoughts and feelings into them. They also came up with the lyrics for "Hanamichi" themselves, which were then put together by Yui Mugino. Furthermore, member Fujihira participated as an assistant in the process of choreographing "Sit Down Please".

@onefive performed in mainland China for the first time at TIF Asia Tour 2025 in Shanghai, held at the Bandai Namco Shanghai Cultural Center on June 14 and 15, 2025. The group also returned to Taiwan for the 2025 Taiwan Comic Exhibition, held at the Taipei World Trade Center on July 25, 2025. On July 26 and 27, the group returned to mainland China for @Jam Shanghai Pop Vol. 1, held at the Bandai Namco Shanghai Cultural Center. @onefive performed for the third time in Taiwan at Trendy Taipei J-pop Night, held at the Taipei Arena on September 7, 2025. As international performances became increasingly common, @onefive expressed their desire to promote Japanese music and culture abroad, in line with their "Japanese Classy Crush" concept.

In July 2025, @onefive collaborated with the American fast-food chain Taco Bell in Japan to create and promote original menu items by the members, which would be available nationwide from July 14 to September 13, 2025. On August 8, 2025, "Tap!Tap!Tap! (TJO Remix)" was featured in a commercial for the Japanese jewelry brand The Kiss, in which the four members also appeared. On October 23, 2025, @onefive was appointed as the official ambassador for the mobile game Strinova. A new version of "Kawaii Kaiwai" in Chinese, titled "Miāo Miāo Xīntiào" (喵喵心跳, "Meow Meow Heartbeat"), became the theme song for the game. In addition, a music video was released in which the members cosplay as characters from the game.

On November 6, 2025, the group began to host its first regular radio show, titled Urunemu (うるねむ), on FM Yokohama. The weekly radio show would continue @onefive's YouTube podcast of the same title, which originally ran for 10 episodes.

In December 2025, member Yoshida created new choreography with the assistance of member Fujihira for a jazzy version of "ChocoLove". It was performed on the first day of the @onefive Live 2025 "Doh Yoh" concerts, which took place at the Hulic Hall in Tokyo on December 20, 2025, and at Bigcat in Osaka on December 26, 2025.

=== 2026–present: Doh Yoh, Road to Budokan, Sakuraization, and Serolla Latte ===
The group's second EP, Doh Yoh, was released on January 15, 2026. It was produced with the cultural theme of dōyō, which are popular Japanese children's songs. For example, the dōyō "Alps Ichiman Jaku", "Momotarō", and "Mori no Kuma-san" are reimagined as Afrobeat, hip-hop, and hyperpop songs in "Alps Vibes", "Kibidango", and "Magical Irony", respectively. The creative opinions of the members are reflected in the music, lyrics, and cover art. "Alps Vibes" received significant attention in South America. "Magical Irony" entered the Billboard Japan Heatseekers Songs chart. On January 30, 2026, a micro-drama was released for "Netsukikyū" (熱気球), featuring actor Robin Furuya and the members of @onefive.

On March 6, 2026, the group was appointed as the spring ambassador for the Japanese arcade chain Apina.

The official member colors of @onefive were announced on March 25, 2026, with red for Fujihira, green for Yoshida, purple for Aritomo, and pink for Mori, which correspond to their favorite colors. The official colors exist in addition to their official roles, which are Fujihira as the "performance leader" (パフォーマンスリーダー), Yoshida as the "shoken killer" (初見キラー; 'first-look killer'), Aritomo as the "datsuryoku-kei onē-san" (脱力系お姉さん; 'laid-back older sister'), and Mori as the "azato rapper" (あざとラッパー; 'cunningly cute rapper').

@onefive launched its Road to Budokan initiative on April 1, 2026, with plans to perform at the Nippon Budokan in 2027. The initiative began with a project called Sakuraization, in which the members embraced their origins in Sakura Gakuin as part of their journey toward the Budokan as @onefive. The first song from the project, "Kakumei Shōjo S" (♡革命少女S♡), samples "Heart no Hoshi" by Sakura Gakuin, and was released on April 15, 2026. The members were involved in the songwriting process through instructing their creative personnel on key words to include in the lyrics and on which parts of the original song to keep. The second song, "M1X5R", samples "Verishuvi" by Sakura Gakuin, and was released on May 20, 2026. The third song, "Muteki Atashi Mōdo" (無敵☆アタシモード), samples "Doki Doki Morning" by the Sakura Gakuin sub-unit Babymetal, and was released on June 24, 2026. It entered the Billboard Japan Heatseekers Songs chart. Babymetal's producer, Kobametal, gave his permission to sample "Doki Doki Morning", and Babymetal member Moametal said she supports @onefive's activities. The three songs were released as a music card titled Sakuraization on June 24, 2026. The @onefive Live 2026 "Sakuraization" concerts were held at the Ex Theater Roppongi in Tokyo on June 6, 2026, and at Bigcat in Osaka on July 3, 2026.

On October 7, 2026, "Vanilla Latte" became the ending theme song for the romantic drama Dekiai Kareshi no Tsukurikata: Se Kara Honmei ni Naru Onnanoko no Hanashi (溺愛カレシの作り方 セから本命になる女の子の話), broadcast on TV Tokyo. "Vanilla Latte" was released digitally on October 8, 2026, and later appeared alongside "Serotonin" on the music card Serolla Latte on October 22, 2026. The members participated in the creative process, asking their songwriters to make "Serotonin" sound more like the Heisei era, as they felt that the initial demo track sounded too much like the Shōwa era. The @onefive Live 2026 Zepp Tour "Serolla Latte" concerts would later take place at Zepp Namba in Osaka on October 30, 2026, and at KT Zepp Yokohama in Kanagawa on November 10, 2026.

It was announced on October 31, 2026, that @onefive would be hosting its own festival for the first time, titled Dash Bash Fes 2027, on February 23, 2027. The name Dash Bash comes from the previous series of self-organized music events that the group had been hosting since August 2025, to which it had invited one or two other artists at a time.

It was announced on November 10, 2026, that @onefive would be performing a solo concert at the Nippon Budokan on October 10, 2027.

== Artistry ==
The members of @onefive actively contribute their ideas to various aspects of the group's creative process, such as song concepts, album sequencing, cover art, setlists, outfits, stage production, and merchandise. The group's lyrics incorporate the thoughts and opinions of its members, and often depict strong Japanese girls. Member Soyoka Yoshida has stated, "We want to deliver the music that we want to do, the music that we believe in, to everyone." While professionals are normally tasked with writing the lyrics and creating the choreography, on certain occasions, the members have directly written lyrics or choreographed in part or in whole for recorded songs. For example, the song "1518" from the album 1518 was wholly written and choreographed by the members. They have also created special pieces of choreography and rewritten lyrics for live shows. Their live shows invite fan chants, circle pits, and rhythmic towel spinning.

@onefive aims to promote the good qualities of Japanese music while also incorporating elements of foreign music. Some of those elements have included hip-hop, rage, Afrobeat, jungle, Jersey club, and Middle Eastern music. For example, "Kaguya" blends hip-hop, EDM, and traditional Japanese music. Hip-hop has been especially prominent, with the songs "Justice Day", "ChocoLove", "Sit Down Please", and "Kibidango" serving as notable examples. Other genres include hyperpop and chiptune. The group's early music has been described as predominantly electropop, with songs like "Pinky Promise", "Mada Minu Sekai" (まだ見ぬ世界), and "BBB". The members have mentioned Blackpink, Perfume, Red Velvet, and Mamamoo as influences. In 2026, member Momoe Mori used the phrase "Babymetal × Perfume = @onefive" to describe the song "Muteki Atashi Mōdo" (無敵☆アタシモード).

While influenced by international sounds and artists, @onefive emphasizes its Japanese origins and identity with its "Japanese Classy Crush" concept. "Classy" refers to old things, stereotypical images and ways of thinking, and conventional ways of doing things. "Crush" expresses @onefive's desire to destroy things of that nature, which hold them back, and to move forward in their own new way instead. "Japanese" emphasizes the cultural origins of the members of @onefive, and indicates that while doing away with the negative parts, the group wishes to preserve and promote the parts of old, traditional Japan that are good and beautiful, such as bowing, calligraphy, and flower arranging. In this regard, the song "OZGi", which is a stylized spelling of ojigi, incorporates traditional Japanese culture in its music, lyrics, and choreography, especially with its "bowing dance". Likewise, "Kaguya" is inspired by The Tale of the Bamboo Cutter and contains a bon odori section. "Alps Vibes", as well, interpolates the melody of the dōyō "Alps Ichiman Jaku", and the outfits for the song include traditional Japanese elements, such as yagasuri, a type of kasuri pattern. Similarly, "Kibidango" reinterprets the dōyō "Momotarō" in the style of "kawaii hip-hop", and its choreography is reminiscent of kneading kibi dango confections.

== Public image and reception ==
@onefive describes itself as a "new species of idol" (新種のアイドル, shinshu no aidoru) that focuses on live performance skills and musicality while also possessing the cuteness and positive energy of traditional Japanese idols. Member Momoe Mori told Modelpress, "From energetic, cute, and child-like songs, to songs that go all out on dance performance, which the public might call K-pop-esque, we have the goodness of Japanese idols, being cute and energizing, but our performance level is also very high, and we can easily do cool songs too." Similarly, regarding the 2025 extended play More Than Kawaii, member Tsugumi Aritomo explained to GirlsNews, "We are happy to receive praise for the cuteness of our appearance, but we would like people to also look at our performance skills and creative side, such as our recent participation in writing lyrics."

Writing for Real Sound, Satoshi Shinkai lauded the group's singing and dancing as "incredibly high level" and "polished through rigorous training". Dai Tanaka from Barks opined, "The singing and dancing skills that @onefive has cultivated are very high." Spice's Endo pointed out the "professional quality" of the self-produced choreography for "Underground" and "Let Me Go". Pop 'n' Roll noted the "multifaceted nature" and "high quality singing and dancing" of the group during a self-choreographed performance of "Just for You" that was accompanied by member Soyoka Yoshida on the piano. Bhodhit Magazine's Yusei Abe observed, "Their live performances are certainly wonderful, but their personalities are truly lovely as well."

In an interview published by Weekly Playboy, it was noted that the group's diverse musical style, which includes both cool and cute songs, was at times criticized in Japan as "a lack of uniformity". That diversity, however, was received positively at @onefive's first international performance in Taiwan, where the group was told, "Having both the good parts of Japanese idols, as well as a high level of performance skills similar to K-pop, is great." Writing in English for Nante Japan, Hannah Lee described @onefive as "pushing the boundaries of what exactly is an 'idol' in today's sound". American journalist Patrick St. Michel identified the quartet as an "idol alternative" that has "always been interested in the cutting edges of idol pop sound rather than its conservative core". Mexico's Revulsión evaluated the group's music as "sonically optimal for the international ear".

Natalie published in October 2026 that female fans comprised approximately half of the fandom.

== Members ==
- Kano Fujihira as Kano
- Soyoka Yoshida as Soyo
- Tsugumi Aritomo as Gumi
- Momoe Mori as Momo

== Discography ==
=== Studio albums ===
- 1518 (February 2, 2022)
- Classy Crush (April 17, 2024)

=== Extended plays ===
- More Than Kawaii (March 26, 2025)
- Doh Yoh (January 15, 2026)

=== Singles ===
- "Mada Minu Sekai" (まだ見ぬ世界) (June 24, 2020)
- "BBB" (March 3, 2021)
- "Chance×Change" (May 24, 2023)
- "Justice Day" (August 23, 2023)

==== Digital singles ====
- "Pinky Promise" (October 20, 2019)
- "Shizuku" (雫) (October 20, 2020)
- "Underground" (November 24, 2021)
- "Just for You" (December 1, 2021)
- "Miraizu" (未来図) (November 6, 2022)
- "Chance" (April 1, 2023)
- "F.A.F.O" (November 22, 2023)
- "ChocoLove" (January 17, 2024)
- "Kaguya" (August 14, 2024)
- "Love Call" (October 16, 2024)
- "Liar Liar" (January 15, 2025)
- "Kawaii Kaiwai" (February 14, 2025)
- "Alps Vibes" (August 1, 2025)
- "Kibidango" (October 22, 2025)
- "Magical Irony" (December 17, 2025)
- "Kakumei Shōjo S" (♡革命少女S♡) (April 15, 2026)
- "M1X5R" (May 20, 2026)
- "Muteki Atashi Mōdo" (無敵☆アタシモード) (June 24, 2026)
- "Vanilla Latte" (October 8, 2026)
- "Serotonin" (October 22, 2026)

=== Other releases ===
- Sakuraization (June 24, 2026)
- Serolla Latte (October 22, 2026)

== Filmography ==
=== Commercial ===
Year	Title	Notes	Ref.
2024	Pair Jewelry Brand "The Kiss" 2024 New Commercial (ペアジュエリーブランド「THE KISS」2024年 新CM)	Features "Love Call"	
2025	Pair Jewelry Brand "The Kiss" 2025 New Commercial (ペアジュエリーブランド「THE KISS」2025年 新CM)	Features "Tap!Tap!Tap! (TJO Remix)"	

=== Documentary ===
Year	Title	Network	Notes	Ref.
2021	@onefive Documentary Series "Their Underground" (@onefive Documentary Series「彼女たちのUnderground」)	YouTube	Four-part series	

=== Film ===
Year	Title	Network	Notes	Ref.
2023	If My Favorite Pop Idol Made It to the Budokan, I Would Die (劇場版 推しが武道館いってくれたら死ぬ)		Features "Chance" as its theme song	
2023	@onefive "Like A" Short Movie	TikTok	Entered into the TikTok Toho Film Festival 2023	

=== Television ===
Year	Title	Network	Notes	Ref.
2022	If My Favorite Pop Idol Made It to the Budokan, I Would Die (推しが武道館いってくれたら死ぬ)	ABC TV; TV Asahi	All 10 episodes Features "Miraizu" as its theme song	
2024	@onefive's Bowing Tour: Let's Go Find Japanese Traditions! (@onefiveのお辞儀ツアー 日本の伝統を探しにいこう！)	CS TV Asahi	Television special	
2025	@onefive Let's Go Beyond Kawaii Tour (@onefive かわいいを超えていこうツアー)	CS TV Asahi	Television special	
2026	@onefive's Good Footage Doh Yoh! (@onefiveの撮れ高DOH YOH！)	CS TV Asahi	Television special	

=== Web ===
Year	Title	Network	Ref.
2022–2023	@onefive New World	Openrec	
2023–2024	15Vibes (Wanfaibu Baibusu) (15VIBES（わんふぁいぶばいぶす）)	YouTube	
2023	@onefive Fun Time!	Logirl	
2024–2026	15Vibes	Logirl	
2025–present	15Ch (Jūgochan) (15CH (じゅうごちゃん))	YouTube	
2026	15Vibes: Gachi de Budōkan ni Iku Made no Hanashi (15VIBES～ガチで武道館にいくまでの話～)	Logirl	
2026–present	@onefive vs Kaname Stone: Budōkan Made ni Katadzuketai 15 no Mondai (@onefive vs カナメストーン「武道館までに片付けたい15の問題」)	YouTube	

=== Other ===
Year	Title	Notes	Ref.
2026	@onefive "Netsukikyū (Hot Air Balloon)" Micro-Drama (@onefive「熱気球 (Hot Air Balloon)」Micro-Drama)	Robin Furuya as Jin	

== Videography ==
=== Video albums ===
Title	Details	Ref.
@onefive 2020 Beginning Online Live (@onefive 2020 始まりのオンラインライブ)	Released: May 26, 2021; Formats: DVD, Blu-ray	
@onefive 1st Live 1518 at Shibuya Club Quattro	Released: August 31, 2022; Formats: Blu-ray	

=== Music videos ===
Title	Year	Director(s)	Ref.
"Pinky Promise"	2019	Kim Nayoung	
"Mada Minu Sekai" (まだ見ぬ世界)	2020	Kim Nayoung	
"BBB"	2021	Shunsuke Sugiyama	
"Underground"	2021	@onefive Taro Okagawa	
"Lalala Lucky"	2022	Shin Ishihara	
"Miraizu" (未来図)	2022	Yuya Kimura	
"Chance"	2023	Takuya Setomitsu	
"Last Blue"	2023	Te2ta	
"Ring Donuts"	2023	Te2ta	
"Justice Day"	2023	Te2ta	
"F.A.F.O"	2023	Te2ta	
"ChocoLove"	2024	Te2ta	
"Mr.Gorgeous"	2024	Te2ta	
"OZGi"	2024	Keisuke Nakashima	
"Kaguya"	2024	Te2ta	
"Love Call"	2024	Shun	
"Alps Vibes"	2025	Keisuke Nakashima	
"Kibidango"	2025	Yichikawa Wang	
"Magical Irony"	2025	Yichuan Wang	
"Kakumei Shōjo S" (♡革命少女S♡)	2026	Yichuan Wang	
"Muteki Atashi Mōdo" (無敵☆アタシモード)	2026	Yichuan Wang	

== Radio and podcast ==
Year	Title	Network	Notes	Ref.
2020	@onefive's Mada Minu Talk (@onefiveのまだ見ぬトーク)	JFN Park	Four-episode radio special	
2025	When Four Childhood Friends of the Same Age Get Together, It's Too Noisy to Sleep (同い年の幼なじみ4人が集まるとうるさくてねむれない件)	YouTube	10-episode podcast Abbreviated as Urunemu (うるねむ)	
2025–present	When Four Childhood Friends of the Same Age Get Together, It's Too Noisy to Sleep (同い年の幼なじみ4人が集まるとうるさくてねむれない件)	FM Yokohama	Weekly radio show Abbreviated as Urunemu (うるねむ)	
