= Tsugumi Aritomo =

Japanese singer, dancer, model, and actress (born 2004)

Tsugumi Aritomo 有友 緒心
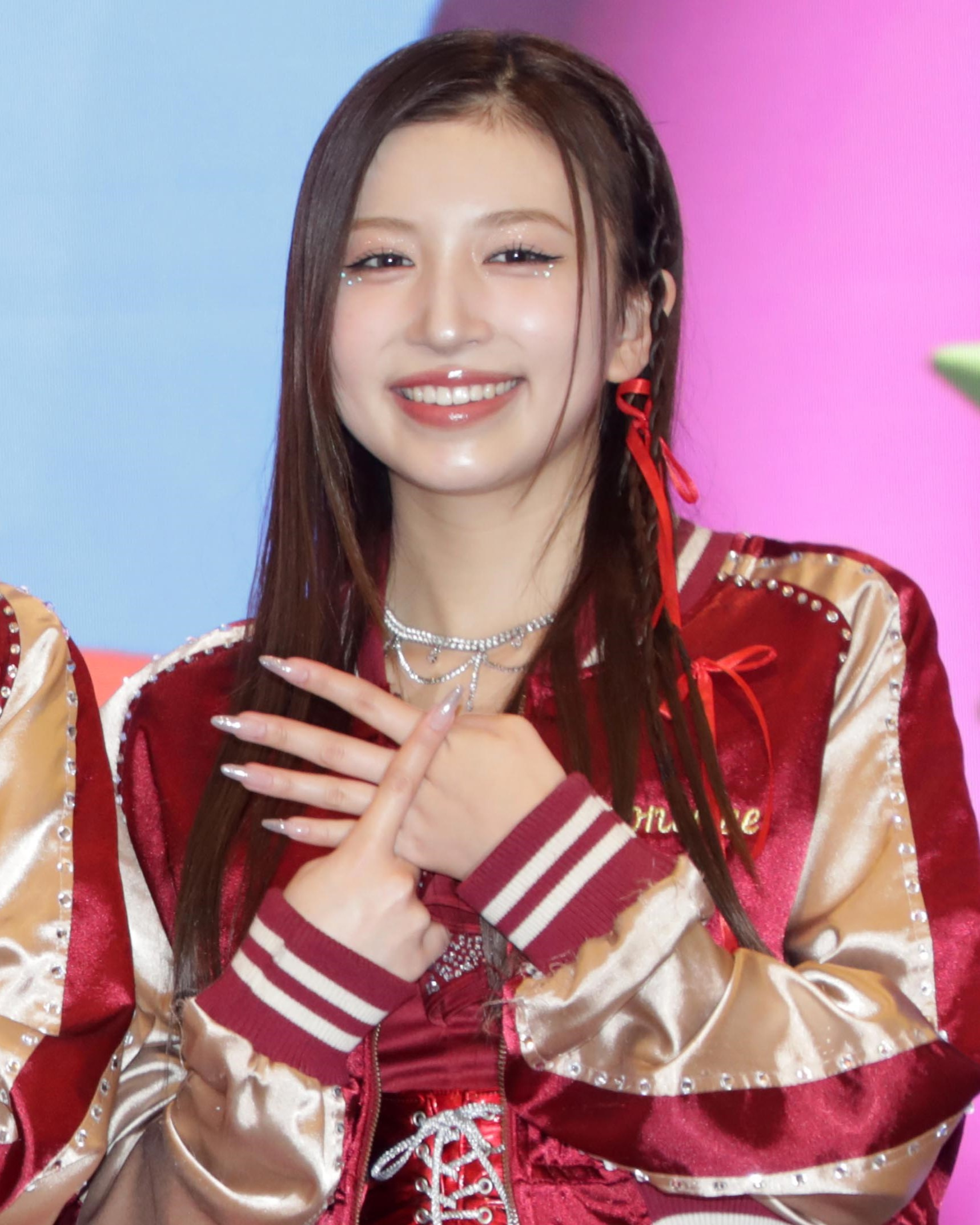
- Aritomo in December 2024

Background information
- Also known as: Gumi (in @onefive)
- Born: September 7, 2004 (age 22); Chiba Prefecture, Japan
- Genres: J-pop; hip-hop
- Occupations: Singer; dancer; model; actress
- Instrument: Vocals
- Years active: 2012–present
- Labels: Amuse Inc. Avex Trax
- Member of: @onefive
- Formerly of: Sakura Gakuin

Tsugumi Aritomo (有友 緒心, Aritomo Tsugumi; born September 7, 2004) is a Japanese singer, dancer, model, and actress. She is best known as a member of the girl group @onefive, and is a former member of the idol group Sakura Gakuin. She is represented by the talent agency Amuse Inc. and is signed with the record label Avex Trax.

== Biography ==
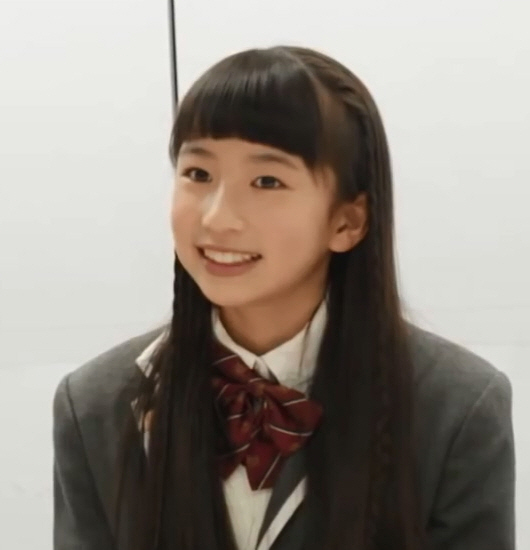
Aritomo with Sakura Gakuin in 2017

Aritomo was born in Chiba Prefecture. She moved to Kyoto when she was half a year old, but returned to Chiba at the age of two. At the age of three, she began learning ballet, piano, and model walking.

In May 2012, she won the grand prize at Sanrio Puroland's "Play! Audition 2012" and joined the talent agency Amuse Inc. She also became the official child model for Sanrio Puroland.

In 2015, Aritomo was cast for two episodes in the Japanese television drama Fake Marriage, which was broadcast on Nippon TV. In 2016, she was cast for two episodes in The Single Teacher Miss Hayako, which was broadcast on Fuji TV.

On May 6, 2016, Aritomo joined the Japanese idol group Sakura Gakuin during the Sakura Gakuin 2016 Transfer Ceremony at the Nakano Sunplaza Hall, along with fellow transfer-ins Momoe Mori and Yuzumi Shintani. She was in her sixth year of elementary school at the time. On November 12 and 13, 2016, she participated in the Sakura Gakuin Festival 2016 held at the Maihama Amphitheater in Chiba Prefecture, and became a member of the group's sub-unit Kōbaibu (Purchasing Club).

Aritomo appeared in magazines associated with the Aikatsu! franchise. In December 2017, she appeared in a promotional music video for Sanrio's Marumofubiyori products. It featured the Ciao Girls, including Aritomo, who appeared in the Ciao magazines published by Shogakukan. On October 11, 2018, it was announced that she would be appearing in two commercials by Bandai for its Tamagotchi Meets toy.

On May 6, 2019, during the Sakura Gakuin 2019 Transfer Ceremony held at the Bunkyo Civic Center, she became the second Hamidase (Stand Out) Chairman of Sakura Gakuin. On October 19, 2019, during the Sakura Gakuin Festival 2019 at the Kanagawa Arts Theatre, it was revealed that Aritomo had formed a four-member girl group named @onefive with fellow Sakura Gakuin members Kano Fujihira, Soyoka Yoshida, and Momoe Mori.

On August 30, 2020, Aritomo graduated from Sakura Gakuin during the concert The Road to Graduation 2019 Final, along with the other three members of @onefive. She had recorded four albums during her time with the group.

In 2021, she was cast in a television commercial for the Nintendo Switch video game console, which was broadcast across Japan. She appeared singing and dancing while playing the games Karaoke Joysound for Nintendo Switch and Just Dance 2021 on the console.

Continuing her entertainment activities under the stage name Gumi, she released her first album with @onefive, titled 1518, on February 2, 2022. Aritomo co-choreographed the songs "1518", "Underground", "Just for You", and "Lalala Lucky", and co-wrote the lyrics for "1518".

On March 18, 2022, she appeared as a character named Mirai in a promotional video for satellite broadcasting by the Association for Promotion of Advanced Broadcasting Services (A-PAB).

In October 2022, Aritomo appeared in the television drama adaptation of the manga If My Favorite Pop Idol Made It to the Budokan, I Would Die as Yūka Teramoto, a member of the fictional idol group ChamJam. The drama was broadcast for ten episodes on ABC TV and TV Asahi until December 2022. She reprised her role in the film adaptation of the manga, which was released on May 12, 2023. Both adaptations also cast the other members of her girl group @onefive and featured the group's music as their theme songs. Aritomo's vocals as ChamJam were included on the album I Live For You (きみのために生きてる, Kimi no Tame ni Ikiteru), released by Pony Canyon on May 10, 2023.

In November 2023, she began modeling for Amazon Fashion Japan, as @onefive had been selected to be its Generation Z Leader.

Aritomo released her second album with @onefive, titled Classy Crush, on April 17, 2024.

On March 26, 2025, she was credited with co-writing the song "Hanamichi", which was released as part of @onefive's first EP, More Than Kawaii. Aritomo felt that her thoughts were well-represented in the EP.

She appeared as a guest on the current affairs program Tamura Atsushi no Kikitai! on April 4 and May 16, 2026, broadcast on Tokyo MX.

== Personal life ==
Aritomo has a brother who is three years younger. She played the flute in the wind band in elementary school. She studied management at university, with Korean and English as foreign languages. Her favorite music genres include R&B and hip-hop. Among the artists that she admires are Red Velvet and Perfume. Her role model is Fujiko Mine. She uses the phrase "datsuryoku-kei onē-san" (脱力系お姉さん; 'laid-back older sister') to describe her own character.

== Associated acts ==
- Sakura Gakuin (2016–2020)
- @onefive (2019–present)

== Discography ==
=== With Sakura Gakuin ===
- Sakura Gakuin 2016 Nendo: Yakusoku (2017)
- Sakura Gakuin 2017 Nendo: My Road (2018)
- Sakura Gakuin 2018 Nendo: Life Iro Asenai Hibi (2019)
- Sakura Gakuin 2019 Nendo: Story (2020)

=== With ChamJam ===
- I Live For You (きみのために生きてる, Kimi no Tame ni Ikiteru) (2023)

=== With @onefive ===
- 1518 (2022)
- Classy Crush (2024)
- More Than Kawaii (2025)
- Doh Yoh (2026)

== Filmography ==
=== Commercial ===
- Marumofukibun Mop Dance (まるもふきぶん モップダンス) (2017) – Sanrio
- Tamagotchi Meets TVCM Runway Hen (たまごっち みーつ TVCM ～ランウェイ編～) (2018) – Bandai
- Tamagotchi Meets Asobikata PV (たまごっち みーつ あそびかたPV) – (2018) – Bandai
- Nintendo Switch TVCM Jibun Jikan Hen 1 (Nintendo Switch TVCM 自分時間篇1) (2021) – Nintendo
- Seishun wa Itsudatte, Kōgashitsu Eisei Hōsō (青春はいつだって、高画質 衛星放送) (2022), Mirai – A-PAB
- Pair Jewelry Brand "The Kiss" 2024 New Commercial (2024)
- Pair Jewelry Brand "The Kiss" 2025 New Commercial (2025)

=== Film ===
- If My Favorite Pop Idol Made It to the Budokan, I Would Die (2023), Yūka Teramoto

=== Television ===
- Fake Marriage (偽装の夫婦, Gisō no Fūfu) (2015) – Episodes 3, 8
- The Single Teacher Miss Hayako (早子先生、結婚するって本当ですか?, Hayako-sensei, Kekkon Surutte Hontō Desu ka?) (2016) – Episodes 1, 4
- If My Favorite Pop Idol Made It to the Budokan, I Would Die (2022), Yūka Teramoto
- Tamura Atsushi no Kikitai! (田村淳のキキタイ！) (2026)
