= Kano Fujihira =

Japanese singer, dancer, model, and actress (born 2004)

Kano Fujihira 藤平 華乃
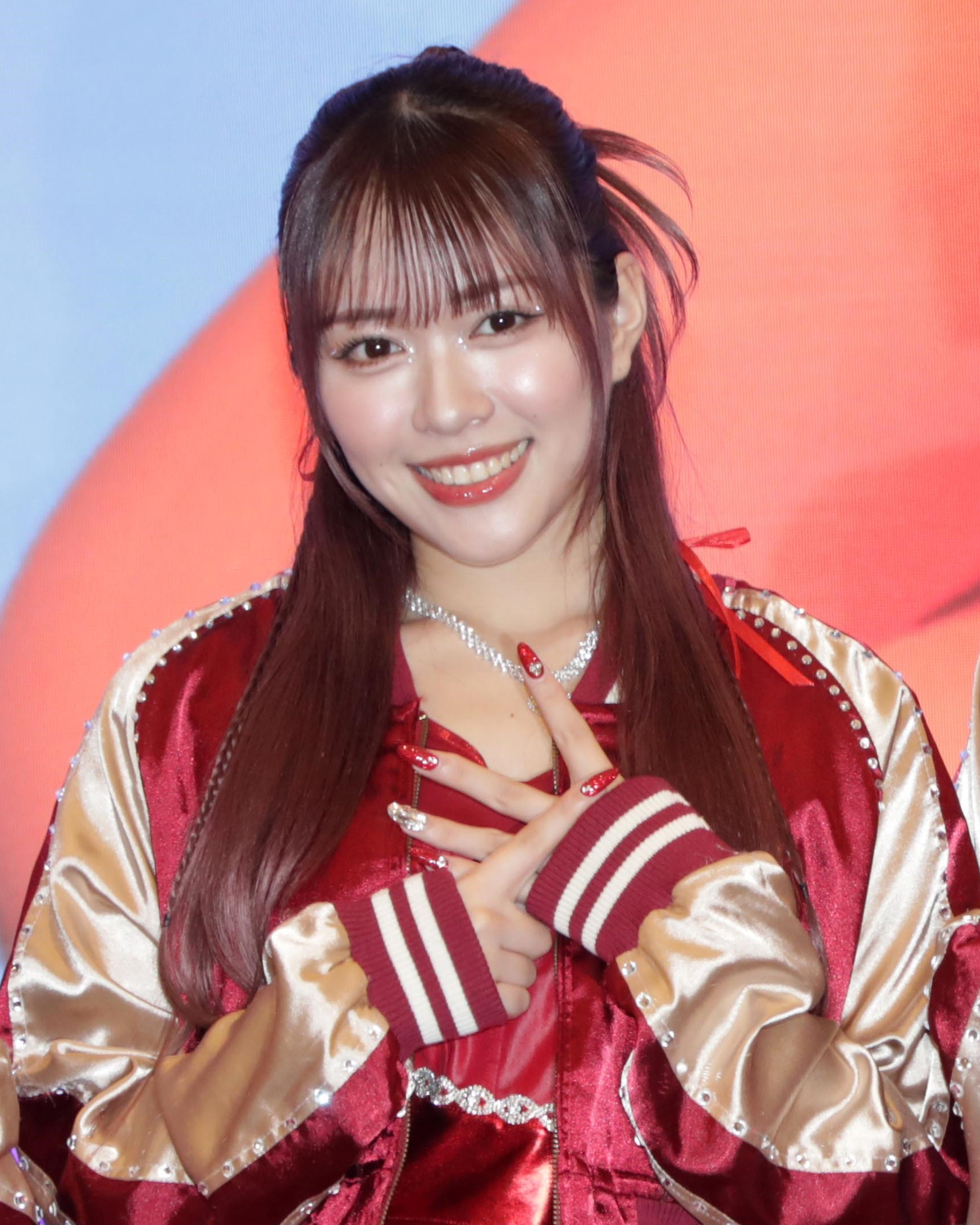
- Fujihira in December 2024

Background information
- Also known as: Kano (in @onefive)
- Born: August 28, 2004 (age 22); Chiba Prefecture, Japan
- Genres: J-pop; hip-hop
- Occupations: Singer; dancer; model; actress
- Instrument: Vocals
- Years active: 2014–present
- Labels: Amuse Inc. Avex Trax
- Member of: @onefive
- Formerly of: Sakura Gakuin

Kano Fujihira (藤平 華乃, Fujihira Kano; born August 28, 2004) is a Japanese singer, dancer, model, and actress. She is best known as a member of the girl group @onefive. She is a former member of the idol group Sakura Gakuin and a former support dancer for the metal band Babymetal. She is represented by the talent agency Amuse Inc. and is signed with the record label Avex Trax.

== Biography ==
Fujihira grew up in the countryside of Chiba Prefecture. She became interested in entertaining people because she wanted to make her sick grandfather smile. In 2013, she auditioned as a model in a photo shoot by Kids-Tokei. She subsequently appeared in the May issue of the magazine De-View, and was recruited by the Amuse Kids division of the talent agency Amuse Inc. in April 2014.

On May 6, 2015, Fujihira joined the Japanese idol group Sakura Gakuin during the Sakura Gakuin 2015 Transfer Ceremony, along with fellow transfer-ins Soyoka Yoshida, Momoko Okazaki, Mirena Kurosawa, Maaya Asō, and Marin Hidaka. On November 12 and 13, 2016, she participated in the Sakura Gakuin Festival 2016 held at the Maihama Amphitheater in Chiba Prefecture, and became a member of the Sakura Gakuin sub-unit Sleepiece.

On December 15, 2017, Fujihira began appearing regularly as Note-chan on the television show Bitworld, which was broadcast on NHK Educational TV.

On May 6, 2018, at the Sakura Gakuin 2018 Transfer Ceremony held at the Nakano Zero Hall, Fujihira became the second Performance Chairman of Sakura Gakuin. On May 6, 2019, at the Sakura Gakuin 2019 Transfer Ceremony held at the Bunkyo Civic Center, she became the ninth Student Council President of the group.

In June 2019, Fujihira became one of the three rotating support dancers, called the Avengers, for the kawaii metal band Babymetal, along with Momoko Okazaki and Riho Sayashi. As Babymetal was originally a trio, after the departure of founding member Yui Mizuno, the support dancers would take turns filling the role of a third dancer. Fujihira performed alongside the two permanent members of Babymetal at the time, Suzuka Nakamoto and Moa Kikuchi, on the second day of the concerts titled Babymetal Awakens: The Sun Also Rises on June 29, 2019, at the Yokohama Arena. She also performed as the support dancer on the second day of the Babymetal Arises: Beyond The Moon: Legend M concerts on July 7, 2019, at Portmesse Nagoya. On December 27, 2019, Fujihira performed with Babymetal on Music Station Ultra Super Live 2019, a live broadcast on TV Asahi. Finally, on January 25 and 26, 2020, she performed at the Legend: Metal Galaxy concerts held at the Makuhari Messe. Fujihira, in the role of an Avenger, appeared in the live music videos for the Babymetal songs "Pa Pa Ya!!", "Elevator Girl", and "Shanti Shanti Shanti".

She appeared in a music video for the Halloween song "Gummy Choco Pumpkin" (グミチョコパンプキン) on October 4, 2019, for which she recorded the vocals.

On October 19, 2019, during the Sakura Gakuin Festival 2019 at the Kanagawa Arts Theatre, it was revealed that Fujihira had formed a four-member girl group named @onefive with fellow Sakura Gakuin members Soyoka Yoshida, Tsugumi Aritomo, and Momoe Mori. At the encore of that same Sakura Gakuin concert, she performed the debut single "Pinky Promise" as @onefive for the first time.

Fujihira graduated from Sakura Gakuin on August 30, 2020, along with the other three members of @onefive, during the concert titled The Road to Graduation 2019 Final. In total, she had recorded five albums with Sakura Gakuin. Continuing her activities with @onefive under the mononym Kano, she has, on occasion, co-written lyrics, choreographed, and produced stage lighting for her girl group.

In August 2021, she was cast in a stage adaptation of the manga Town of Evening Calm, Country of Cherry Blossoms as Kyōka Ōta. It was performed from August 4 to 8 at the CBGK Shibugeki theater in Tokyo, and on August 14 and 15 at the Kintetsu Art Museum in Osaka.

In January 2022, Fujihira began to appear on the television show Super Invincible Class, which was broadcast on Nippon TV.

On February 2, 2022, she released her first album with @onefive, titled 1518, and pronounced ichi-go ichi-e. She co-wrote the song "1518", and co-choreographed "1518", "Underground", "Just for You", and "Lalala Lucky".

In March 2022, Fujihira was cast in a stage adaptation of the manga Umimachi Diary as Suzu Asano. It was performed from March 30 to April 3 at the Theater Sun Mall in Tokyo, and on April 9 and 10 at the ABC Hall in Osaka.

On November 6, 2022, Fujihira and the rest of her girl group made their major label debut with Avex Trax when their digital single "Miraizu" (未来図) was released. The song was featured as the theme song for the television drama adaptation of the manga If My Favorite Pop Idol Made It to the Budokan, I Would Die, which was broadcast from October to December 2022. On May 12, 2023, the film adaptation of the manga was released with @onefive's "Chance" as its theme song. Fujihira and the other members of @onefive were cast in both live-action adaptations as members of the fictional idol group ChamJam, with Fujihira playing the role of Maki Hakata. Her vocals as ChamJam were included on the second disc of the two-disc album I Live For You (きみのために生きてる, Kimi no Tame ni Ikiteru), released by Pony Canyon on May 10, 2023.

In November 2023, Fujihira began modeling for Amazon Fashion Japan, as @onefive had been selected to be its Generation Z Leader.

Fujihira released her second album with @onefive, titled Classy Crush, on April 17, 2024. She noted that the opportunity to improvise a section of the choreography for "Justice Day" with the other members challenged her to grow as a performer.

She co-wrote the song "Hanamichi" for @onefive's first EP, More Than Kawaii, which was released on March 26, 2025. She also participated as an assistant in the process of choreographing "Sit Down Please".

In April 2025, she was cast in the stage play Fuyū no Ichigo as Nozomi. It was performed from May 29 to June 1, 2025, at the Senbonzakura Hall in Tokyo.

In December 2025, she assisted @onefive member Yoshida with creating new choreography for a jazzy version of their song "ChocoLove".

In February 2026, it was announced that Fujihira had been cast as Aiai in the stage play Gyakuten Manrui Sayonara, Mata Ne., which was performed from April 8 to 12, 2026, at the Big Tree Theater in Ikebukuro.

She appeared on the variety show Potsun to Ikkenya on June 14, 2026, broadcast on ABC TV.

== Personal life ==
Fujihira is left-handed. She was in the dance club in high school. She studied dance at Nihon Kogakuin College, along with English as a foreign language. Her father was a firefighter. She has an older brother. Her influences include Morning Musume and Blackpink. Her role model is Moa Kikuchi.

== Associated acts ==
- Sakura Gakuin (2015–2020)
- Babymetal (2019–2020)
- @onefive (2019–present)

== Discography ==
=== With Sakura Gakuin ===
- Sakura Gakuin 2015 Nendo: Kirameki no Kakera (2016)
- Sakura Gakuin 2016 Nendo: Yakusoku (2017)
- Sakura Gakuin 2017 Nendo: My Road (2018)
- Sakura Gakuin 2018 Nendo: Life Iro Asenai Hibi (2019)
- Sakura Gakuin 2019 Nendo: Story (2020)

=== With ChamJam ===
- I Live For You (きみのために生きてる, Kimi no Tame ni Ikiteru) (2023)

=== With @onefive ===
- 1518 (2022)
- Classy Crush (2024)
- More Than Kawaii (2025)
- Doh Yoh (2026)

== Filmography ==
=== Commercial ===
- Pair Jewelry Brand "The Kiss" 2024 New Commercial (2024)
- Pair Jewelry Brand "The Kiss" 2025 New Commercial (2025)

=== Film ===
- Inuyashiki (2018), Shion Watanabe (Childhood)
- If My Favorite Pop Idol Made It to the Budokan, I Would Die (2023), Maki Hakata

=== Television ===
- Bitworld (2017–2018), Note-chan
- If My Favorite Pop Idol Made It to the Budokan, I Would Die (2022), Maki Hakata
- Super Invincible Class (超無敵クラス, Chō Muteki Kurasu) (2022–2023)
- Potsun to Ikkenya (ポツンと一軒家) (2026)

== Theater ==
- Town of Evening Calm, Country of Cherry Blossoms (2021), Kyōka Ōta
- Umimachi Diary (2022), Suzu Asano
- Fuyū no Ichigo (蜉蝣一期) (2025), Nozomi
- Gyakuten Manrui Sayonara, Mata Ne. (逆転満塁サヨナラ、またね。) (2026), Aiai
