= Momoe Mori =

Japanese rapper, dancer, model, and actress (born 2004)

Momoe Mori 森 萌々穂
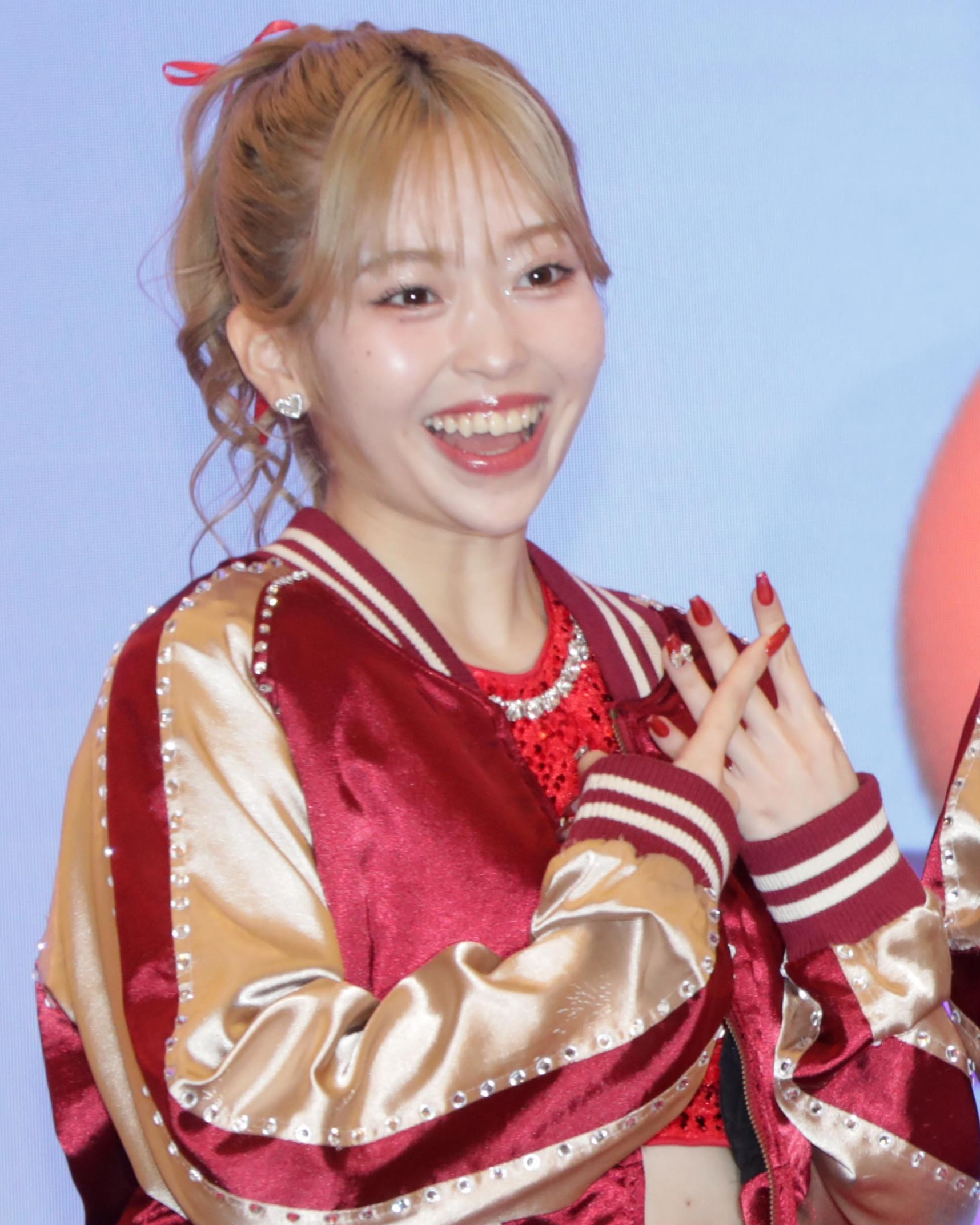
- Mori in December 2024

Background information
- Also known as: Momo (in @onefive)
- Born: December 8, 2004 (age 21); Tokyo Metropolis, Japan
- Genres: J-pop; hip-hop
- Occupations: Rapper; dancer; model; actress
- Instrument: Vocals
- Years active: 2011–present
- Labels: Amuse Inc. Avex Trax
- Member of: @onefive
- Formerly of: Sakura Gakuin

Momoe Mori (森 萌々穂, Mori Momoe; born December 8, 2004) is a Japanese rapper, dancer, model, and actress. She is best known as a member of the girl group @onefive, and is a former member of the idol group Sakura Gakuin. She is represented by the talent agency Amuse Inc. and is signed with the record label Avex Trax.

== Biography ==
Mori's career in the entertainment industry began in her first year of elementary school. She was recruited by the talent agency Amuse Inc. after participating in the "Ciao Girl Audition". She was active as a child actress. Her earliest appearances in media included the Japanese television shows Saki in 2013, Soredemo Boku wa Kimi ga Suki in 2015, and Kūfuku Anthology in 2016. She also modeled for Ciao. She appeared in the 2014 music video for "Cling Cling" by Perfume. In March 2016, she played the role of Mio in the radio drama Brother Rhapsody, broadcast on NHK FM. She played the role of Hirata-san in the 2016 film My Uncle. In that same year, Mori was cast as the daughter of the fictional family seen in the series of commercials released by Panasonic under the title of Fudan Premium for its home appliances. She also appeared in several commercials for the toy manufacturer Agatsuma.

Mori joined the Japanese idol group Sakura Gakuin during the Sakura Gakuin 2016 Transfer Ceremony, held at the Nakano Sunplaza Hall on May 6, 2016, along with fellow transfer-ins Tsugumi Aritomo and Yuzumi Shintani. She was in her sixth year of elementary school at the time.

On October 29 and 30, 2016, she appeared as a model at Jack-o-Land, held at the Yokohama Arena.

In 2017, she appeared in a promotional dance video, as well as an accompanying dance lesson video, produced by Takara Tomy for its Licca-chan doll brand. In June 2017, she performed at the Tokyo Toy Show 2017, held at Tokyo Big Sight, in promotion of the Licca-chan doll brand.

In June 2018, she performed at the Tokyo Toy Show 2018, held at Tokyo Big Sight, in promotion of the Licca-chan doll brand.

She participated in the Sakura Gakuin Festival 2018 on November 25, 2018, held at the Tokyo International Forum, and became a member of the group's sub-unit Trico Dolls. During the Sakura Gakuin 2019 Transfer Ceremony, held at the Bunkyo Civic Center on May 6, 2019, she became the sixth Talk Chairman of Sakura Gakuin.

In June 2019, she performed at the Tokyo Toy Show 2019, held at Tokyo Big Sight, in promotion of the Licca-chan doll brand.

On October 19, 2019, during the Sakura Gakuin Festival 2019 at the Kanagawa Arts Theatre, it was revealed that Mori had formed a four-member girl group named @onefive with fellow Sakura Gakuin members Kano Fujihira, Soyoka Yoshida, and Tsugumi Aritomo. On August 30, 2020, she graduated along with the other three members from Sakura Gakuin during the concert titled The Road to Graduation 2019 Final.

In June 2021, Mori appeared on the Japanese variety show What's Wrong with Being Wily?, which was broadcast on TV Asahi. She was unanimously voted the winner of the 1st Azato Audition, entitling her to appear in a future mini-drama.

Continuing her entertainment activities under the stage name Momo, she released her first album with @onefive, titled 1518, on February 2, 2022. She co-wrote the title track "1518", and co-choreographed "1518", "Underground", "Just for You", and "Lalala Lucky".

Mori and the rest of her girl group made their major label debut with Avex Trax on November 6, 2022, when their digital single "Miraizu" (未来図) was released. The song was featured as the theme song for the television drama adaptation of the manga If My Favorite Pop Idol Made It to the Budokan, I Would Die, which was broadcast from October to December 2022. On May 12, 2023, the film adaptation of the manga was released with @onefive's "Chance" as its theme song. Mori was cast in both adaptations as Sorane Matsuyama, a member of the fictional idol group ChamJam. Her vocals as ChamJam were included on the album I Live For You (きみのために生きてる, Kimi no Tame ni Ikiteru), which was released by Pony Canyon on May 10, 2023.

On October 7, 2023, Mori appeared as a model at Giga Giga Sonic at the Makuhari Messe. In November 2023, she began modeling for Amazon Fashion Japan, as @onefive had been selected to be its Generation Z Leader.

Mori released her second album with @onefive, titled Classy Crush, on April 17, 2024. She was in charge of rapping.

She was credited with co-writing "Hanamichi" on @onefive's first EP, More Than Kawaii, which was released on March 26, 2025.

On September 23, 2025, Mori appeared as a model at Starrz Tokyo 2025 at the Nihon Kogakuin Arena.

She appeared in the Japanese fashion magazine Zipper's 2025–2026 winter issue, published by Shodensha on December 27, 2025. She also appeared in the 2026 spring, 2026 summer, and 2026–2027 winter issues.

On February 27, 2026, Mori appeared on the variety show Waragami-sama wa Totsuzen ni..., broadcast on Nippon Television.

In February 2026, she modeled for More Self Love's spring collection. In March 2026, she modeled for Poneycomb Tokyo's collection featuring Disney and MLB.

She appeared monthly as a guest on the current affairs program Tamura Atsushi no Kikitai! from April to August 2026, and in November 2026, broadcast on Tokyo MX.

On October 17, 2026, Mori modeled for Min Costume on the runway at Giga Giga Sonic at the Makuhari Messe.

== Personal life ==
Mori grew up in a single mother household. She was in the handicraft, music, and cooking clubs in elementary school. She studied English literature at university, with French as an additional foreign language. She began listening to hip-hop as she started to have rap sections in @onefive's songs, and uses the term "azato rapper" (あざとラッパー; 'cunningly cute rapper') to describe herself. She is also fond of hyperpop. Among the music artists that she admires are Babymetal and Kanye West. Her role model is Mayu Watanabe.

== Associated acts ==
- Sakura Gakuin (2016–2020)
- @onefive (2019–present)

== Discography ==
=== With Sakura Gakuin ===
- Sakura Gakuin 2016 Nendo: Yakusoku (2017)
- Sakura Gakuin 2017 Nendo: My Road (2018)
- Sakura Gakuin 2018 Nendo: Life Iro Asenai Hibi (2019)
- Sakura Gakuin 2019 Nendo: Story (2020)

=== With ChamJam ===
- I Live For You (きみのために生きてる, Kimi no Tame ni Ikiteru) (2023)

=== With @onefive ===
- 1518 (2022)
- Classy Crush (2024)
- More Than Kawaii (2025)
- Doh Yoh (2026)

== Filmography ==
=== Commercial ===
- Fudan Premium (ふだんプレミアム) (2016) – Panasonic
- Ciao Model Satsuei Taiken-kai (ちゃおモデル撮影体験会) (2016) – Studio Alice
- Love Ami (ラブあみ) (2016) – Agatsuma
- Girls Designer Collection FC (ガールズデザイナーコレクションFC) (2016) – Agatsuma
- Kira Pet Dome (キラペットドーム) (2016) – Agatsuma
- Sumikko Gurashi Kirakira Snowdome (すみっコぐらし きらきらスノードーム) (2017) – Agatsuma
- Daigaku Nyūgaku Kyōtsū Test Trial Kokuchi-hen (大学入学共通テストトライアル告知篇) (2021) – Kawaijuku
- Daigaku Nyūgaku Kyōtsū Test Trial Gakusei no Honne/Joshi A-hen (大学入学共通テストトライアル学生の本音／女子A篇) (2021) – Kawaijuku
- Mieru Kara, Nobaseru. (見えるから、伸ばせる。) (2022) – Study Sapuri
- Pair Jewelry Brand "The Kiss" 2024 New Commercial (2024)
- Pair Jewelry Brand "The Kiss" 2025 New Commercial (2025)

=== Film ===
- My Uncle (ぼくのおじさん, Boku no Ojisan) (2016), Hirata-san
- If My Favorite Pop Idol Made It to the Budokan, I Would Die (2023), Sorane Matsuyama

=== Television ===
- Saki (サキ) (2013), Saki Amihama (Childhood) – Episode 8
- Kodomo Anzen Real Story (子ども安全リアル・ストーリー) (2015) – Episode 1
- Soredemo Boku wa Kimi ga Suki (それでも僕は君が好き) (2015)
- Kūfuku Anthology (空腹アンソロジー) (2016)
- What's Wrong with Being Wily? (あざとくて何が悪いの？, Azatokute Nani ga Warui no?) (2021)
- If My Favorite Pop Idol Made It to the Budokan, I Would Die (2022), Sorane Matsuyama
- Waragami-sama wa Totsuzen ni... Chidori no Shima Series Fuyu no 2 Jikan SP (笑神様は突然に…千鳥の島シリーズ冬の2時間SP) (2026)
- Tamura Atsushi no Kikitai! (田村淳のキキタイ！) (2026)

== Videography ==
=== Music video appearances ===
Title	Year	Artist	Director	Ref.
"Cling Cling"	2014	Perfume	Daisuke Shimada	
