= 1518 (album) =

2022 studio album by @onefive

Studio album by @onefive
- Released: February 2, 2022
- Genres: J-pop; electropop
- Length: 41:45
- Label: Amuse Inc.

@onefive chronology
1518 (2022)	Classy Crush (2024)

Singles from 1518
- 1. "Pinky Promise" Released: October 20, 2019; 2. "Mada Minu Sekai (まだ見ぬ世界)" Released: June 24, 2020; 3. "Shizuku (雫)" Released: October 20, 2020; 4. "BBB" Released: March 3, 2021; 5. "Underground" Released: November 24, 2021; 6. "Just for You" Released: December 1, 2021

1518, pronounced ichi-go ichi-e, is the first studio album by the Japanese girl group @onefive. It was released in physical form on February 2, 2022, by the record label Amuse Inc. A digital release followed shortly after on February 14, 2022.

== Overview ==
The album was titled 1518 because @onefive was formed in the year that all of its four members turned 15 years old, and the album was released in the year that they would be turning 18 years old. The title, as is the case with the name of the artist, is also a reference to the concept of ichi-go ichi-e, which the members value. The title, track sequence, and visuals of the album were decided by the members of @onefive.

The songs "Pinky Promise", "Mada Minu Sekai" (まだ見ぬ世界), and "BBB" have been described as electropop. The scale of the chorus of "BBB" is reminiscent of Arabic music.

The title track "1518", which expresses gratitude towards their fans, marked the first time that the members wrote their own lyrics. Fujihira and Yoshida came up with the words that they wanted to include in the lyrics, and Mori and Aritomo gave shape to them. They also created the entire choreography for the song. The other songs on the album, though not written directly by them, were written through asking them about their thoughts and opinions.

"Underground" was choreographed by the four members of @onefive, marking the first time that they created their own choreography. Its creation was documented in a four-part documentary series released on YouTube titled Their Underground (彼女たちのUnderground). They also choreographed "Just for You". The choreography for the debut single "Pinky Promise" was created by Mikiko. Minako "Maru" Maruyama from the dance troupe Elevenplay, which is directed by Mikiko, choreographed "Mada Minu Sekai", "Shizuku" (雫), and "BBB". The members of @onefive co-choreographed "Lalala Lucky" with Maru.

The members were deeply involved in the production of the music video for "Underground", sharing their ideas on hairstyles, makeup, outfits, visuals, and cuts. The music video for "BBB" includes scenes that were recorded by the members using a movie film camera. The music video for "Mada Minu Sekai" was recorded by the members at their own homes due to the COVID-19 pandemic. Fujihira created the official lyric video for "Kan Kōhī to Chokorēto Pan" (缶コーヒーとチョコレートパン).

The music video for "Lalala Lucky" was produced in collaboration with students of N High School and in cooperation with Adobe. The collaboration highlighted @onefive's desire to be "a group that grows up with the same generation". The outfits worn by @onefive in the music video for "BBB" were a collaboration with the fashion brand Apres Jour. The glass accessories worn as part of the outfits for "Shizuku" were a collaboration with Hario. The single "Just for You" was featured in the 2021 Christmas commercial of the Japanese jewelry brand The Kiss. "Lalala Lucky" was featured in a web commercial for the hair dye brand Beautylabo.

A special edition of 1518 was also released on the same day as the standard edition. While it lacked the three instrumental tracks, it included a 24-page photo book and a Blu-ray disc containing the recording process of "Pinky Promise", a digest of @onefive's pajama party livestream, and the director's cut version of the documentary Their Underground. The members contributed their ideas to the design of the packaging and the arrangement of the photos in the booklet.

1518 charted at number 40 on the weekly Oricon Albums Chart and at number 6 on the weekly Tower Records J-indies chart.

== Track listing ==
Standard edition
No.	Title	Lyrics	Music	Length
1.	"Pinky Promise"	Yura	The Charm Park; Yūki Tsujimura	3:21
2.	"Lalala Lucky"	Yūki Tsujimura; Yura	Yūki Tsujimura	3:56
3.	"1518"	@onefive	Chocoholic; Kiyoshi Ikegami	3:51
4.	"BBB"	Yūki Tsujimura; Yura	Yūki Tsujimura	3:17
5.	"Kan Kōhī to Chokorēto Pan" (缶コーヒーとチョコレートパン)	Yura	Chocoholic	3:30
6.	"Just for You"	Yura	Chocoholic	3:24
7.	"Underground"	Yūki Tsujimura; Yura	Yūki Tsujimura	3:19
8.	"Shizuku" (雫)	Yūki Tsujimura; Yura	Yūki Tsujimura	3:42
9.	"Mada Minu Sekai" (まだ見ぬ世界)	Yūki Tsujimura; Yura	Yūki Tsujimura	3:51
10.	"Lalala Lucky (Instrumental)"		Yūki Tsujimura	3:57
11.	"Underground (Instrumental)"		Yūki Tsujimura	3:19
12.	"Shizuku (Instrumental Dance ver.)" (雫 -Instrumental Dance ver.-)		Yūki Tsujimura	2:13
Total length:				41:45

== Personnel ==
- Kano Fujihira as Kano – vocals (tracks 1–9), lyrics (track 3)
- Soyoka Yoshida as Soyo – vocals (tracks 1–9), lyrics (track 3)
- Tsugumi Aritomo as Gumi – vocals (tracks 1–9), lyrics (track 3)
- Momoe Mori as Momo – vocals (tracks 1–9), lyrics (track 3)
- Chocoholic – music (tracks 3, 5, 6)
- Kiyoshi Ikegami – music (track 3)
- The Charm Park – music (track 1)
- Yūki Tsujimura – music (tracks 1, 2, 4, 7–12), lyrics (tracks 2, 4, 7–9)
- Yura – lyrics (tracks 1, 2, 4–9)
