= Classy Crush =

2024 studio album by @onefive

Studio album by @onefive
- Released: April 17, 2024
- Genre: J-pop; hip-hop
- Length: 41:52
- Label: Avex Trax

@onefive chronology
1518 (2022)	Classy Crush (2024)	More Than Kawaii (2025)

Singles from Classy Crush
- 1. "Miraizu (未来図)" Released: November 6, 2022; 2. "Chance" Released: April 1, 2023; 3. "Chance×Change" Released: May 24, 2023; 4. "Justice Day" Released: August 23, 2023; 5. "F.A.F.O" Released: November 22, 2023; 6. "ChocoLove (ショコラブ)" Released: January 17, 2024

Classy Crush is the second studio album and first major label album by the Japanese girl group @onefive. It was released on April 17, 2024, by the record label Avex Trax.

== Overview ==
The title Classy Crush originated from @onefive's group concept, "Japanese Classy Crush". "Classy" refers to old things, stereotypical images and ways of thinking, and conventional ways of doing things. "Crush" expresses @onefive's desire to destroy things of that nature, which hold them back, and to move forward in their own new way instead. However, "Japanese" indicates that, while doing away with the negative parts, the group wishes to preserve and promote the parts of old, traditional Japan that are good and beautiful. This concept is encapsulated in the lead song on the album, "OZGi", pronounced ojigi, with its Japanese theme and bowing dance.

The title of the album and its track sequence were decided by the members themselves, and they participated in the final album check. Member Aritomo indicated that Classy Crush presents the messages that the members would like to convey through their music with stronger intentionality than the previous album. Yoshida confirmed that their desire to break existing stereotypes was indeed expressed through the album. Mori noted that their real life experiences were included in "F.A.F.O", and that her preference for the color pink was reflected in "Mr.Gorgeous". Fujihira recalled that the opportunity to improvise a section of the choreography for "Justice Day" with the other members challenged her to grow as a performer.

The album represented a shift for @onefive toward the direction of hip-hop, especially with the digital singles "Justice Day" and "ChocoLove". Other musical influences included jungle, Jersey club, traditional Japanese music, and Middle Eastern music. Many of the songs depict strong Japanese girls.

The single "Miraizu" (未来図), which was released digitally on November 6, 2022, marked @onefive's major label debut with Avex Trax. It was used as the theme song for the live-action television drama adaptation of the manga If My Favorite Pop Idol Made It to the Budokan, I Would Die, which was first broadcast in October 2022. "Chance" was used as the theme song for the film adaptation that followed on May 12, 2023. All four members of @onefive were cast in both adaptations as members of the fictional idol group ChamJam.

A short film was released for "Like A" on August 14, 2023, featuring actor Taisuke Niihara and the members of @onefive. The members were involved in the production from the scriptwriting stage. The film was entered into the TikTok Toho Film Festival 2023.

On June 4, 2023, the music video for "Ring Donuts" featured a collaboration with Krispy Kreme Doughnuts. On August 26, 2023, "Like A" was featured in a commercial for the Japanese jewelry brand The Kiss. On April 8, 2024, "Mr.Gorgeous" was featured in a commercial for Amazon Prime Video.

Classy Crush was released in two versions, with one containing a Blu-ray disc in addition to the CD. The album charted at number 16 on the weekly Oricon Albums Chart and at number 17 on the weekly Billboard Japan Top Album Sales chart.

== Track listing ==
Classy Crush
No.	Title	Lyrics	Music	Length
1.	"OZGi"	Jonna Hall; Koshin; Yui Mugino	Koshin	3:39
2.	"Justice Day"	Ryōsuke "Dr.R" Sakai; Ryōta Hiratsuka; Yui Mugino	Hirapark; Ryōsuke "Dr.R" Sakai	3:18
3.	"Mr.Gorgeous"	INFX; Zeyun	INFX; Zeyun	3:31
4.	"F.A.F.O"	Emyli	Taku Takahashi	3:13
5.	"Last Blue"	Zeyun	Zeyun	3:08
6.	"ChocoLove" (ショコラブ)	Fofu; Sunny Boy	Fofu; Sunny Boy	3:14
7.	"Kono Mama ja Koware-sō" (このままじゃ壊れそう)	Yura; Zeyun	Zeyun	3:49
8.	"Miraizu" (未来図)	Ken Itō; Yūki Tsujimura	Yūki Tsujimura	3:41
9.	"Chance"	Shusui; Tsubomi; Zeyun	Shusui; Tsubomi; Zeyun	3:23
10.	"Like A"	Lee Dong Heon; Zeyun	Lee Dong Heon; Zeyun	3:45
11.	"Sawage"	J-Dash; Zeyun	Zeyun	3:33
12.	"Ring Donuts"	Kanro Maeda; Zeyun	Zeyun	3:38
Total length:				41:52

== Personnel ==
- Kano Fujihira as Kano – vocals (all tracks)
- Soyoka Yoshida as Soyo – vocals (all tracks)
- Tsugumi Aritomo as Gumi – vocals (all tracks)
- Momoe Mori as Momo – vocals (all tracks)
- Emyli – lyrics (track 4)
- Fofu – lyrics (track 6), music (track 6)
- Hirapark – music (track 2)
- INFX – lyrics (track 3), music (track 3)
- J-Dash – lyrics (track 11)
- Jonna Hall – lyrics (track 1)
- Kanro Maeda – lyrics (track 12)
- Ken Itō – lyrics (track 8)
- Koshin – lyrics (track 1), music (track 1)
- Lee Dong Heon – lyrics (track 10), music (track 10)
- Ryōsuke "Dr.R" Sakai – lyrics (track 2), music (track 2)
- Ryōta Hiratsuka – lyrics (track 2)
- Shusui – lyrics (track 9), music (track 9)
- Sunny Boy – lyrics (track 6), music (track 6)
- Taku Takahashi – music (track 4)
- Tsubomi – lyrics (track 9), music (track 9)
- Yui Mugino – lyrics (tracks 1, 2)
- Yūki Tsujimura – lyrics (track 8), music (track 8)
- Yura – lyrics (track 7)
- Zeyun – lyrics (tracks 3, 5, 7, 9–12), music (tracks 3, 5, 7, 9–12)
