= Soyoka Yoshida =

Japanese singer, dancer, model, and actress (born 2004)

Soyoka Yoshida 吉田 爽葉香
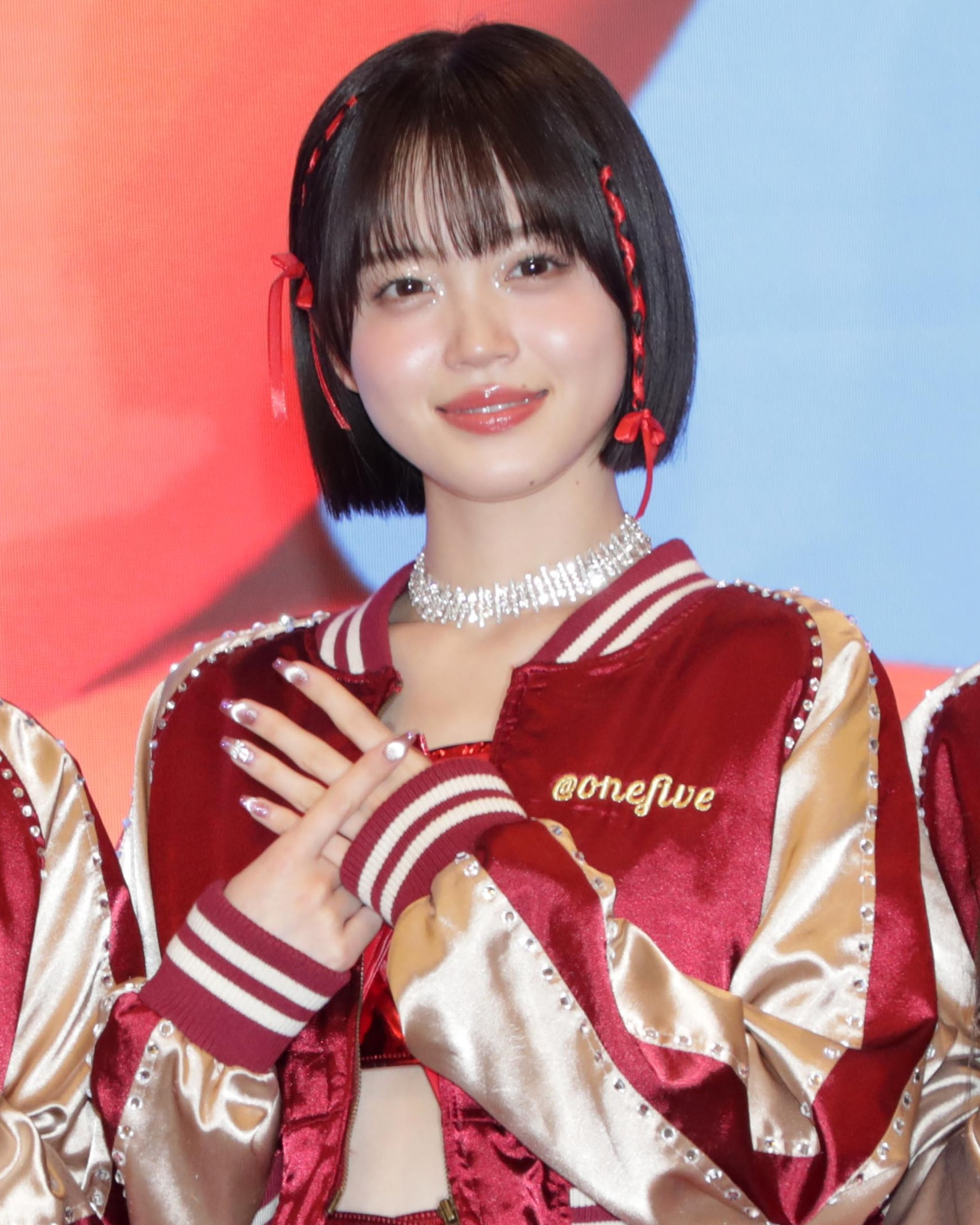
- Yoshida in December 2024

Background information
- Also known as: Soyo (in @onefive)
- Born: June 14, 2004 (age 22); Osaka Prefecture, Japan
- Genres: J-pop; hip-hop
- Occupations: Singer; dancer; model; actress
- Instruments: Vocals; piano
- Years active: 2013–present
- Labels: Amuse Inc. Avex Trax
- Member of: @onefive
- Formerly of: Sakura Gakuin

Soyoka Yoshida (吉田 爽葉香, Yoshida Soyoka; born June 14, 2004) is a Japanese singer, dancer, model, and actress. She is best known as a member of the girl group @onefive, and is a former member of the idol group Sakura Gakuin. She is represented by the talent agency Amuse Inc. and is signed with the record label Avex Trax.

== Biography ==
Yoshida began taking lessons in piano, Electone, gymnastics, and English at the age of three. She started working as a catalog model in her middle year of kindergarten, when she was five years old. She appeared in Hysteric Mini catalogs and magazines. In her third year of elementary school, at the age of nine, she participated in a fashion show where she was recruited by the talent agency Amuse Inc. She was awarded the grand prize at Hysteric Mini's Fashion Contest 2013.

Yoshida joined the Japanese idol group Sakura Gakuin on May 6, 2015, during the Sakura Gakuin 2015 Transfer Ceremony, along with fellow transfer-ins Kano Fujihira, Momoko Okazaki, Mirena Kurosawa, Maaya Asō, and Marin Hidaka. On August 1, 2015, she became a member of the group's sub-unit Kōbaibu, or Purchasing Club. During the Sakura Gakuin 2018 Transfer Ceremony, held at the Nakano Zero Hall on May 6, 2018, she became the Education Chairman of the group.

On August 17, 2018, it was announced that Yoshida would be regularly modeling for the Japanese fashion brand Repipi Armario.

On May 6, 2019, during the Sakura Gakuin 2019 Transfer Ceremony held at the Bunkyo Civic Center, Yoshida became the second Ganbare (Perseverance) Chairman of Sakura Gakuin. On October 19, 2019, during the Sakura Gakuin Festival 2019 held at the Kanagawa Arts Theatre, it was revealed that Yoshida had formed a four-member girl group named @onefive with fellow Sakura Gakuin members Kano Fujihira, Tsugumi Aritomo, and Momoe Mori. On August 30, 2020, Yoshida graduated along with the other three @onefive members from Sakura Gakuin during the concert titled The Road to Graduation 2019 Final. In total, she had recorded five albums with Sakura Gakuin.

Adopting the stage name Soyo, she released her first album with @onefive, titled 1518, on February 2, 2022. For the album, Yoshida co-wrote the song "1518", and co-choreographed "1518", "Underground", "Just for You", and "Lalala Lucky".

On March 18, 2022, Yoshida was cast as a character named Rin in a promotional video for satellite broadcasting by the Association for Promotion of Advanced Broadcasting Services (A-PAB).

On April 26, 2022, she began to appear as a monthly regular on the radio station FM Shiga's Catch the Artist! (アーティストをキャッチ！) program.

Yoshida was cast in the television drama and film adaptations of the manga If My Favorite Pop Idol Made It to the Budokan, I Would Die as Yumeri Mizumori, a member of the fictional idol group ChamJam, along with the other three members of @onefive. The drama was broadcast for ten episodes from October to December 2022, and the film was released on May 12, 2023. Her vocals on ChamJam's songs from the adaptations were included on the second disc of the two-disc album I Live For You (きみのために生きてる, Kimi no Tame ni Ikiteru), which was released by Pony Canyon on May 10, 2023.

In January 2023, Yoshida modeled for Mia Hat & Accessory's 2023 spring and summer collection.

She appeared in the film 18-sai, Tsumugimasu as Shōko Sakurai on March 24, 2023.

She appeared in the 15th Weekly Playboy issue of 2023, published by Shueisha.

On October 7, 2023, she appeared as a runway model at Giga Giga Sonic at the Makuhari Messe. In November 2023, Yoshida began modeling for Amazon Fashion Japan after @onefive was selected to be its Generation Z Leader.

Yoshida released her second album with @onefive, titled Classy Crush, on April 17, 2024. She expressed that her desire to break existing stereotypes was reflected in the album.

She co-wrote the song "Hanamichi", which appeared on @onefive's first EP, More Than Kawaii, on March 26, 2025.

In April 2025, she modeled for the Japanese fashion brand Item's Season04 collection. In August 2025, she modeled for the launch of Tatre Meidaimae's Heavenly Cheesecake brand. Yoshida appeared as a runway model at Starrz Tokyo 2025 on September 23, 2025, at the Nihon Kogakuin Arena.

In December 2025, Yoshida created new choreography with the assistance of @onefive member Fujihira for a jazzy version of their song "ChocoLove".

In February 2026, she modeled for More Self Love's spring collection. In March 2026, she modeled for Poneycomb Tokyo's collection featuring Disney and MLB, as well as Double Name's collection featuring Hello Kitty and M:rex. On August 10, 2026, she became the image model for Refrear's new colored contact lens brand Unrolla Pop. She appeared as a model on the cover of the August 2026 issue of the British publication The Hat Magazine. In September 2026, she modeled for the Japanese fashion brand Item's Season05 collection. On October 17, 2026, she appeared as a runway model in collaboration with Min Costume at Giga Giga Sonic at the Makuhari Messe.

== Personal life ==
Yoshida is proficient at playing the piano, which she began to play at the age of three. She was part of the manga and illustration club, paper craft club, and broadcasting committee in elementary school. She was the head of the calligraphy club in middle school, and was in the Japanese tea ceremony club in high school. Her studies at university focused on nutritional science, and included sports and Chinese as a foreign language. Her sister is a pharmacist and is five years older. Her mother was a calligraphy teacher. Her father died when she was a child. The music artists that she likes include Mamamoo and TVXQ. Her role model is Ringo Shiina. She has the nickname "shoken killer" (初見キラー; 'first-look killer') in Japanese.

== Associated acts ==
- Sakura Gakuin (2015–2020)
- @onefive (2019–present)

== Discography ==
=== With Sakura Gakuin ===
- Sakura Gakuin 2015 Nendo: Kirameki no Kakera (2016)
- Sakura Gakuin 2016 Nendo: Yakusoku (2017)
- Sakura Gakuin 2017 Nendo: My Road (2018)
- Sakura Gakuin 2018 Nendo: Life Iro Asenai Hibi (2019)
- Sakura Gakuin 2019 Nendo: Story (2020)

=== With ChamJam ===
- I Live For You (きみのために生きてる, Kimi no Tame ni Ikiteru) (2023)

=== With @onefive ===
- 1518 (2022)
- Classy Crush (2024)
- More Than Kawaii (2025)
- Doh Yoh (2026)

== Filmography ==
=== Commercial ===
- Seishun wa Itsudatte, Kōgashitsu Eisei Hōsō (青春はいつだって、高画質 衛星放送) (2022), Rin – A-PAB
- Pair Jewelry Brand "The Kiss" 2024 New Commercial (2024)
- Pair Jewelry Brand "The Kiss" 2025 New Commercial (2025)

=== Film ===
- 18-sai, Tsumugimasu (18歳、つむぎます) (2023), Shōko Sakurai
- If My Favorite Pop Idol Made It to the Budokan, I Would Die (2023), Yumeri Mizumori

=== Television ===
- If My Favorite Pop Idol Made It to the Budokan, I Would Die (2022), Yumeri Mizumori
