= Song 3 (Babymetal and Slaughter to Prevail song) =

Single by Babymetal and Slaughter to Prevail

from the album Metal Forth and Grizzly
- Released: May 29, 2025
- Genre: J-pop; heavy metal; deathcore
- Length: 3:33
- Label: Capitol; Sumerian
- Songwriters: Miki "333-metal" Watanabe; Aleksandr Shikolai (credited as Aleksandr Igorevish and Shikolai); Jack Simmons; Nikita Korzhov; Takeru "Takemetal" Yōda; Tatsuo "Tatsuometal" Konno
- Producer: Kobametal

Babymetal singles chronology
"From Me to U" (2025)	"Song 3" (2025)	"Kon! Kon!" (2025)

Slaughter to Prevail singles chronology
"Russian Grizzly In America" (2025)	"Song 3" (2025)

Music video
- Song 3 on YouTube

"Song 3" is a song by Japanese band Babymetal and Russian band Slaughter to Prevail, released as a digital single on May 29, 2025, and appeared on their albums Metal Forth (2025) and Grizzly (2025), respectively.

== Background and production ==
According to Slaughter to Prevail lead vocalist Aleksandr "Alex Terrible" Shikolai, the two bands met at Resurrection Fest held in Spain in the summer of 2024, where Babymetal's producer Kobametal suggested to the Slaughter to Prevail members a collaboration between the two bands, noting Babymetal's love for them, to which they agreed.

The music was written by Slaughter to Prevail in hotel rooms while on a tour with Five Finger Death Punch. Then the instrumental was sent over to the Babymetal team to recorded vocals for the track, and Alex recorded vocals afterward, ultimately calling the collaboration "amazing" due to the band's ability to create "something new in metal", as well as the process being "simple" due to their efficiency.

== Composition ==
Composed by various musicians, including Shikolai and Slaughter to Prevail guitarist Jack Simmons, "Song 3" is characterized by counting lines and lyrical wordplay regarding the number three (san), and combines the vocals and dancing of Babymetal with the "heavy tank"-like riffs from Slaughter to Prevail, creating a style together in a manner of Beauty and the Beast, accompanied by shamisen performed by Trivium guitarist Matt Heafy.

Featured on the track is a death growl battle between Momoko "Momometal" Okazaki and Shikolai that pulls the music into a unique world between a villainous song and a kawaii song. It was also noted that the track has a length of 3:33, and that Okazaki was born on March 3, 2003, alongside other Easter eggs related to the number three. Additionally, the recurring growl of "Ichi! Ni! Thunder!" was found to be reminiscent of shouts by wrestler Antonio Inoki.

The track's breakdown includes guttural vocals by Shikolai, making use of Russian lyrics that contain elements of "fire and nationalism", but also with an "anti-isolationist, boundary-smashing ethos".

== Critical reception ==
"Song 3" received mixed to positive reviews from music critics. Some praised the band's fusion of musical styles, with Daishi Atō of Pia Music Complex likening their fusion to that of "Oh! Majinai" from Babymetal's third album, Metal Galaxy (2019). Pete Bailey of British online newspaper Primordial Radio described the track as "part war cry, part playground chant, and entirely revolutionary", and that it advanced Babymetal's "ethos of controlled chaos". He further noted that the song could be called "Babymetal at their most distilled" due to repetition and "refusal to explain itself", yet not a detour from the band's penchant for the unexpected, and called Shikolai's performance "jarring but perfectly engineered juxtaposition to the pastel-toned aggression" associated with Babymetal. Britt Mae of Melodic Magazine called the track "one of their most aggressive offerings to date" and "as theatrical as it is brutal" and calling the combination of melodic choruses and Shikolai's gutturals a "cinematic and precise" tension.

Others were divided on the lyrical content, with Isabella Ambrosio of Metal Injection noting a "chunky breakdown in the bridge that leaves a bit to be desired", calling the track "relatively boring" and failing to "do much more than everyone has come to know, expect, and often love of deathcore", while Atō remarked that the combination of counting to three in a villainous way was comically mismatched with the lines of "tō-san, kā-san, nii-san, nē-san, ojii-san, obā-san" (father, mother, brother, sister, grandfather, grandmother). In contrast, Bailey noted that despite the Japanese lyrics being "poignant" with references to various topics such as middle school and Mt. Fuji, the track was brilliant in its universality by uniting people of different cultures with the theme of "three".

== Commercial performance ==
"Song 3" charted on the Billboard Japan Top Download Songs chart at number 72 on the week of June 9, 2025. In the United States, the song charted on the Billboard Hot Hard Rock Songs and World Digital Song Sales charts on the week of June 14, 2025, peaking at number 21 and number 6, respectively.

== Music video ==
A teaser for the music video was first posted on Babymetal's official YouTube channel on May 23, 2025, along with a short of Okazaki and Shikolai taking part in a screaming competition posted on May 27, 2025. The full video, directed by Takasuke Kato, premiered alongside the digital single on May 29, 2025. It depicts Shikolai as a child in a demon mask being bullied and tormented by evil subordinates in daily life, but eventually grows up to become a "monstrous force of nature" with assistance from the Babymetal members.

== Live performances ==
The song debuted on the Babymetal UK & Europe Arena Tour 2025 during the first show in Brussels on May 10, 2025, and has since been performed multiple times, including at the O2 Arena in London on May 30, 2025.

== Charts ==
Weekly chart performance for "Song 3"
Chart (2025)	Peak position
Japan Download Songs (Billboard)	72
US Hot Hard Rock Songs (Billboard)	21
US World Digital Song Sales (Billboard)	6

== Personnel ==
Credits adapted from Tidal.

Babymetal

- Suzuka Nakamoto – vocals
- Moa Kikuchi – vocals
- Momoko Okazaki – vocals

Slaughter to Prevail

- Aleksandr "Alex Terrible" Igorevish Shikolai – vocals, composition, lyrics
- Jack Simmons – guitar, composition, lyrics

Additional personnel

- Kobametal – production
- Miki "333-metal" Watanabe – composition, lyrics
- Nikita Korzhov – composition, lyrics
- Takeru "Takemetal" Yōda – composition, lyrics
- Tatsuo "Tatsuometal" Konno – composition, lyrics
- Matthew K. Heafy – shamisen
- Ted Jensen – mastering
- Egor Krotov – mixing
- Watametal – recording engineer
