= From Me to U (song) =

- Live single cover

Single by Babymetal featuring Poppy

from the album Metal Forth
- Released: April 4, 2025
- Recorded: 2025
- Length: 3:25
- Label: Capitol
- Songwriters: Moriah Rose Pereira; Jordan Fish; Mk-metal
- Producers: Kobametal; Jordan Fish

Babymetal singles chronology
"Ratatata" (2024)	"From Me to U" (2025)	"Song 3" (2025)

Poppy singles chronology
"The Cost of Giving Up" / "Crystallized" (2024)	"From Me to U" (2025)	"End of You" (2025)

Music video
- "From Me to U" on YouTube

"From Me to U" (stylized in lower case) is a song by Japanese band Babymetal, featuring American singer Poppy. It was released on April 4, 2025, through Capitol Records. It serves as the third single from the band's fifth studio album, Metal Forth (2025). The track marks the band's first collaboration with Poppy and coincided with their signing to Capitol for a new global partnership.

== Background and development ==
The collaboration stemmed from Babymetal's concept for Metal Forth, which Kobametal described as an album of "crossovers" that push their sound "beyond metal". Poppy, a long-time admirer of the band, said: "I have been a fan of Babymetal for years and I am so happy for this song to finally be here! They have inspired me so much".

Moametal explained that the track symbolizes two visions: "a utopia where Babymetal exists and a dystopia where Poppy exists – facing each other while somehow co-existing". Poppy added that she had written the song's lyrics years earlier in a journal, including the Japanese phrase "kimi ni todoke", which she later revived for the collaboration as a theme of passing power "from me to you – from me to Babymetal and back again".

== Composition ==
"From Me to U" alternates between heavy breakdowns and bright, pop-styled choruses, with verses driven by "fast-chugged riffage and diamond-resplendent synth sounds".

Forever Loud called it a "ferocious J-pop meets metal track" that merges precision drumming with catchy hooks. Knotfest highlighted the "fusion of precision percussion and high-octane riffage" with "spacey synth", emphasizing the vocal interplay between Babymetal's "elegance" and Poppy's "explosiveness".

The chorus centers on the chant "Kimi ni todoke", which critics observed functions as a live call-and-response. MetalMuse described it as "practically made for fans to shout in unison". The arrangement also features sudden tempo changes, electronic interludes, and a key change at the last chorus.

== Music video ==
The music video was directed by Takuya Oyama. It depicts Babymetal and Poppy performing choreographed routines in a neon-soaked dystopian "Neo-Tokyo" interspersed with chaotic digital imagery. Visual motifs include futuristic skyscrapers, glowing effects, and underwater sequences. The climax shows Poppy undergoing a dramatic CGI transformation into a dragon, unleashing flames amid collapsing ruins.

Critics such as Revolver compared the sequence to a "Madam Mim-style metamorphosis" while Forever Loud described it as a "surreal climax" reinforcing the song's themes of destruction and rebirth.

== Reception ==
Forever Loud deemed the song as a "futuristic assault on the senses", singling out the dragon sequence as the highlight. Alternative Press echoed similar praise, calling the song "furious and Poppy-assisted", and highlighting its mix of riffs and synths. MetalTalk emphasized the balance between "signature choreography" and a "world teetering on the edge of destruction".

Knotfest praised the fusion of riffs, synths, and vocal contrast, believing that it would become "an anthem" and an "auspicious start for the modern era of Babymetal". MetalMuse described the collaboration as an "absolute glitter bomb of kawaii-core metal", spotlighting its "brain-hooking" chorus chant and the narrative arc of the video.

The song was featured in the official trailer for Marvel Zombies.

== Live performances ==
Poppy joined Babymetal onstage at London's O2 Arena in June 2025 to perform the song during the encore. This recording of the song was released on October 3, 2025.

== Charts ==
Chart performance for "From Me to U"
Chart (2025)	Peak position
Japan Digital Singles (Oricon)	24
Japan Download Songs (Billboard)	27
UK Singles Downloads (OCC)	63
UK Singles Sales (OCC)	65
US Hot Hard Rock Songs (Billboard)	9

== Personnel ==
- Babymetal – vocals
- Poppy – guest vocals, co-writer
- Kobametal – producer
- Jordan Fish – co-writer/producer

== Release history ==
"From Me to U" release history
Date	Format(s)	Version	Label	Ref.
April 4, 2025	Digital download; streaming	Original	Capitol	
October 3, 2025	Digital download; streaming	Live from the O2	Capitol	
January 30, 2026	Vinyl	Original; live from the O2	Capitol	
