= Ratatata =

Single by Babymetal and Electric Callboy

from the album Metal Forth and Tanzneid
- Language: English; Japanese
- Released: May 23, 2024
- Length: 3:36
- Label: Century Media; Capitol
- Composers: Norimetal; Daniel Haniß; Kevin Ratajczak; Nico Sallach; Pascal Schillo
- Producers: Kobametal; Daniel Haniß; Kevin Ratajczak; Nico Sallach; Pascal Schillo

Babymetal singles chronology
"Metali!!" (2023)	"Ratatata" (2024)	"From Me to U" (2025)

Electric Callboy singles chronology
"Hurrikan" (2022)	"Ratatata" (2024)	"Elevator Operator" (2025)

Music video
- "Ratatata" on YouTube

"Ratatata" (stylized in all caps) is a song by Japanese kawaii metal band Babymetal and German electronicore band Electric Callboy. It was released as a standalone single on May 23, 2024, and was later included on Babymetal's album Metal Forth and Electric Callboy's album Tanzneid.

== Background ==
On May 16, 2024, a teaser video announced the two bands had collaborated on a single called "Ratatata", to be released on May 23. They played the song live together for the first time during Babymetal's Fox Fest in Saitama on May 25. The bands later collaborated on a mobile game that featured the song on its soundtrack.

Following the song's release, Babymetal revealed in interviews the collaboration happened because they wanted to create a song similar to Electric Callboy's track "We Got the Moves", as they enjoyed the audience participation that was an important component of the song during live shows; struggling to write a new song in this vein, they contacted Electric Callboy directly for advice, which instead led to the two bands collaborating on the song that became "Ratatata".

== Music video ==
The music video for the song was directed and produced by Schillobros, a film production company founded by Electric Callboy's rhythm guitarist Pascal Schillo, and was released alongside the single on May 23, 2024. As of July 2026, it has over 62 million views on YouTube.

== In popular culture ==
The song served as the main theme for the 2024 WWE pay-per-view Bash in Berlin, and was featured on the soundtrack of the video game WWE 2K25 the following year.

== Reception ==
Speaking for Consequence, Jon Hadusek described the two bands as "two of the most prominent practitioners of 'dance metal'" and that the song "lives up to its billing [...] tech-y metal riffs are infused into a pulsing EDM beat, over which Babymetal and Electric Callboy share vocal duties—the former handling the higher melodies and the latter providing the gutturals and metalcore vox".

== Personnel ==
Credits adapted from Tidal.

Babymetal

- Suzuka Nakamoto – lead vocals, engineering
- Moa Kikuchi – background vocals, engineering
- Momoko Okazaki – background vocals, engineering

Electric Callboy

- Kevin Ratajczak – vocals, keyboards, composition, lyrics, engineering, programming, production
- Nico Sallach – vocals, composition, lyrics, production, engineering
- Daniel Haniß – lead guitar, composition, lyrics, production, engineering, mixing
- Pascal Schillo – rhythm guitar, backing vocals, composition, lyrics, production, engineering
- Daniel Klossek – bass, backing vocals, engineering
- David-Karl Friedrich – drums, engineering

Additional personnel

- Kobametal – production
- MK-metal – lyrics
- Norimetal – composition
- Christoph Wieczorek – mastering
- Manuel Renner – additional production

== Charts ==
=== Weekly charts ===
Weekly chart performance for "Ratatata"
Chart (2024)	Peak position
Australia Digital Tracks (ARIA)	24
Austria (Ö3 Austria Top 40)	66
Germany (GfK)	55
New Zealand Hot Singles (RMNZ)	39
UK Singles Downloads (OCC)	22
UK Singles Sales (OCC)	23
UK Rock & Metal (OCC)	22
US Hot Hard Rock Songs (Billboard)	6

=== Year-end charts ===
Year-end chart performance for "Ratatata"
Chart (2024)	Position
US Hot Hard Rock Songs (Billboard)	25
