= Metal Forth =

- Standard edition cover (Note: Deluxe edition includes the subtitle below the artwork.)

Studio album by Babymetal
- Released: August 8, 2025
- Genre: Kawaii metal
- Length: 35:31
- Labels: Universal; Amuse; BMW Fox; Capitol
- Producer: Kobametal

Babymetal chronology
Babymetal Returns: The Other One (2023)	Metal Forth (2025)

Singles from Metal Forth
- 1. "Metali!!" Released: August 18, 2023; 2. "Ratatata" Released: May 23, 2024; 3. "From Me to U" Released: April 4, 2025; 4. "Song 3" Released: May 28, 2025; 5. "Kon! Kon!" Released: July 11, 2025; 6. "My Queen" Released: August 8, 2025

Metal Forth is the fifth (Note: The band considers Metal Forth to be their fourth album, with The Other One (2023) viewed as a standalone "concept album".) studio album by Japanese heavy metal band Babymetal. Originally scheduled for release on June 13, 2025, it was delayed several times and eventually released on August 8, 2025. It is the first Babymetal album to feature Momoko Okazaki as an official member and the first to be released following the band's signing to Capitol Records. Metal Forth peaked at number nine on the Billboard 200, becoming the first Japanese act to chart in the top ten in the United States.

== Background ==
Metal Forth was announced on April 1, 2025. The title is a play on words, meaning "beyond metal" and referencing the band's view of it as their fourth studio album. It is the first Babymetal album to feature Momoko Okazaki as an official member since she joined the band in 2023 after the departure of Yui Mizuno in 2018, and the first to be released following the band's signing to Capitol Records in early 2025.

The collaborative nature of the album marks a departure from the band's previous albums, with only three of its tracks lacking a guest artist. It has been noted for the varied backgrounds of said artists as it features Tom Morello, Polyphia, and Poppy from the United States; Spiritbox from Canada; Electric Callboy from Germany; Bloodywood from India; and Slaughter to Prevail from Russia. The album was produced by the band's creator Kobametal, whilst the opening track was co-written and produced by Jordan Fish of English band Bring Me the Horizon, whose 2020 song "Kingslayer" featured Babymetal.

== Critical reception ==
Professional ratings
Aggregate scores
Source	Rating
Metacritic	76/100
Review scores
Source	Rating
Blabbermouth	8/10
Clash	7/10
DIY	4/5 stars
Dork	4/5 stars
Kerrang!	4/5
Metal Hammer	4/5 stars
Paste	8.5/10
NME	3/5 stars
Sputnikmusic	3.2/5

Metal Forth received generally positive reviews from music critics, at Metacritic, which assigns a normalized rating out of 100 to reviews from mainstream publications, the album received an average score of 76, which indicates "generally favorable reviews", based on nine reviews.

The album received a score of 7/10 from Clash reviewer Sam Walker-Smart, who described it as "unrelentingly maximalist as fans could hope for—an audacious whirlwind of global collaborations, high-gloss chaos, and boundless enthusiasm". It was assigned a rating of 8/10 by Blabbermouth, which called it "an audacious delight" and "the snappiest Babymetal release to date". Kerrang! gave it a verdict of 4/5 stars, noting that "there are moments of genius here [...] in forging new bonds and attempting to break new ground, Metal Forth's intentions are noble and the executions occasionally excellent". It was rated 4/5 by Dork, which referred to it as "complex, polished and unshakeable", and DIY described it as "harmonic and balanced". NME gave it 3/5 stars and noted that "while some tracks on Metal Forth showcase the best aspects of each artist, others feel forced, and the end result dilutes the signature sound of the group". Sputnikmusic assigned it a rating of 3.2/5 and said that the album "doesn't feel like a new release, and more importantly, it doesn't sound like a Babymetal album".

== Commercial performance ==
Metal Forth debuted at number three on the Oricon Combined Weekly Albums chart for the week of August 18, 2025 with 24,374 equivalent album units, debuting at the top of the Digital Albums chart with 2,264 first-week downloads, debuting at number three on the Physical Albums chart with 21,723 sales, while also topping the Rock Albums chart. The album also managed to chart on the Billboard Japan Hot Albums chart at number 15 for the week of August 13, 2025.

In the United States, Metal Forth debuted at number nine on the Billboard 200 for the week of August 23, 2025, with 36,000 equivalent album units earned, of which 2,500 units were acquired from streaming units equivalent to 3.28 million on-demand official streams, and 33,500 units were pure album sales, allowing the album to debut at number two on the Top Album Sales chart and giving the act their biggest sales week. The former chart placement also marked the first time an all-Japanese act charted a top ten album in the history of the Billboard 200.

== Promotion ==
Babymetal World Tour 2025–2026
- World tour by Babymetal
- Location: Europe; North America; Asia; South America
- Associated album: Metal Forth
- Start date: May 10, 2025
- End date: December 12, 2026
- Legs: 10
- No. of shows: 95
- Supporting acts: Bambie Thug; Poppy; Bloodywood; Black Veil Brides; Jinjer; Halestorm; Violent Vira; Bilmuri; I Prevail

Babymetal concert chronology
- Babymetal World Tour 2023–2024 (2023-2024); Babymetal World Tour 2025–2026 (2025–2026)

On the October 23, 2024 Babymetal announced a 2025 UK and European arena tour, beginning on May 10, 2025 in Belgium and ending on May 30, 2025 at the The O2 Arena in the UK, becoming the first Japanese musicians to headline and sell out a show at the latter venue. Tour dates for the North American leg of the tour were announced on March 15, 2025, with dates ranging from June 13 to July 23, 2025, with a finale show later announced for the Intuit Dome in November 2025.

Babymetal World Tour 2025–2026

Date	City	Country	Venue	Opening act
Europe
May 10, 2025	Brussels	Belgium	Forest National	Bambie Thug; Poppy
May 12, 2025	Hamburg	Germany	Barclays Arena	Bambie Thug; Poppy
May 13, 2025	Amsterdam	Netherlands	AFAS Live	Bambie Thug; Poppy
May 16, 2025	Frankfurt	Germany	Jahrhunderthalle	Bambie Thug; Poppy
May 17, 2025	Berlin	Germany	Velodrom	Bambie Thug; Poppy
May 19, 2025	Kraków	Poland	Tauron Arena	Bambie Thug; Poppy
May 20, 2025	Nuremberg	Germany	Arena Nürnberger Versicherung	Bambie Thug; Poppy
May 22, 2025	Dübendorf	Switzerland	The Hall	Bambie Thug; Poppy
May 25, 2025	Madrid	Spain	Palacio Vistalegre	Bambie Thug; Poppy
May 26, 2025	Barcelona	Spain	Poble Espanyol	Bambie Thug; Poppy
May 28, 2025	Paris	France	Le Zénith	Bambie Thug; Poppy
May 30, 2025	London	United Kingdom	The O2 Arena	Bambie Thug; Poppy
North America
June 13, 2025	Houston	United States	713 Music Hall	Black Veil Brides; Bloodywood
June 14, 2025	Irving	United States	Toyota Music Factory	Black Veil Brides; Bloodywood
June 17, 2025	Tampa	United States	Yuengling Center	Black Veil Brides; Bloodywood
June 18, 2025	Atlanta	United States	Coca-Cola Roxy	Black Veil Brides; Bloodywood
June 20, 2025	Charlotte	United States	Skyla Credit Union Amphitheater	Black Veil Brides; Bloodywood
June 21, 2025	Baltimore	United States	Pier Six Concert Pavilion	Black Veil Brides; Bloodywood
June 24, 2025	New York	United States	The Theater at Madison Square Garden	Black Veil Brides; Bloodywood
June 25, 2025	Boston	United States	MGM Music Hall	Black Veil Brides; Bloodywood
June 27, 2025	Uncasville	United States	Mohegan Sun Arena	Black Veil Brides; Bloodywood
June 28, 2025	Philadelphia	United States	TD Pavilion	Black Veil Brides; Bloodywood
June 30, 2025	Quebec	Canada	Place Bell	Black Veil Brides; Bloodywood
July 2, 2025	Toronto	Canada	Coca-Cola Coliseum	Black Veil Brides; Bloodywood
July 3, 2025	Sterling Heights	United States	Michigan Lottery Amphitheatre	Black Veil Brides; Bloodywood
July 5, 2025 (Note: This show was a part of the Milwaukee 2025 SummerFest festival)	Milwaukee	United States	Henry W. Maier Festival Park Milwaukee	—
July 6, 2025	Maryland Heights	United States	Saint Louis Music Park	Bloodywood; Jinjer
July 8, 2025	Chicago	United States	Byline Bank Aragon Ballroom	Bloodywood; Jinjer
July 9, 2025	Minneapolis	United States	Minneapolis Armory	Bloodywood; Jinjer
July 14, 2025	Vancouver	Canada	Doug Mitchell Thunderbird Sports Centre	Bloodywood; Jinjer
July 15, 2025	Kent	United States	accesso ShoWare Center	Bloodywood; Jinjer
July 17, 2025	San Francisco	United States	Masonic Auditorium	Bloodywood; Jinjer
July 18, 2025	San Francisco	United States	Masonic Auditorium	Bloodywood; Jinjer
July 20, 2025	Las Vegas	United States	Palms Casino Resort	Bloodywood; Jinjer
July 21, 2025	West Valley City	United States	Utah First Credit Union Amphitheatre	Bloodywood; Jinjer
July 23, 2025	Phoenix	United States	Arizona Financial Theater	Bloodywood; Jinjer
Asia
August 13, 2025	Yokohama	Japan	KT Zepp Yokohama	Metalverse
August 14, 2025	Yokohama	Japan	KT Zepp Yokohama	Metalverse
August 16, 2025	Tokyo	Japan	Makuhari Messe	—
August 17, 2025	Osaka	Japan	Expo '70 Commemorative Park	—
August 20, 2025	Nagoya	Japan	Comtec Portbase Nagoya	Metalverse
August 21, 2025	Osaka	Japan	Zepp Osaka Bayside	Metalverse
August 24, 2025	Bangkok	Thailand	Impact Challenger Hall	
August 30, 2025	Kanagawa	Japan	K-Arena Yokohama	—
August 31, 2025	Kanagawa	Japan	K-Arena Yokohama	—
September 28, 2025 (Note: This show was a part of the Busan International Rock Festival 2025)	Busan	South Korea	Samnak Ecological Park	—
September 30, 2025	Hong Kong		AsiaWorld–Arena	—
October 2, 2025	Taipei	Taiwan	Zepp New Taipei	—
October 4, 2025 (Note: This show was a part of the Formula 1 Singapore Grand Prix 2025)	Singapore		Marina Bay Street Circuit	—
October 6, 2025	Kuala Lumpur	Malaysia	Zepp Kuala Lumpur	Metalverse
October 8, 2025	Manila	Philippines	Smart Araneta Coliseum	Metalverse
North America
November 1, 2025	Los Angeles	United States	Intuit Dome	Jason Richardson
November 7, 2025	Mexico City	Mexico	Arena CDMX	—
Asia
January 10, 2026	Saitama	Japan	Saitama Super Arena	—
January 11, 2026	Saitama	Japan	Saitama Super Arena	—
Oceania
March 12, 2026	Perth	Australia	Perth High Performance Centre	Magnolia Park; Bloodywood
March 14, 2026	Adelaide	Australia	Adelaide Entertainment Centre	Magnolia Park; Bloodywood
March 17, 2026	Melbourne	Australia	John Cain Arena	Magnolia Park; Bloodywood
March 19, 2026	Sydney	Australia	Hordern Pavillion	Magnolia Park; Bloodywood
March 20, 2026	Sydney	Australia	Hordern Pavillion	Magnolia Park; Bloodywood
March 22, 2026	Brisbane	Australia	Riverstage	Magnolia Park; Bloodywood
Asia
March 29, 2026	Tokyo	Japan	Tokyo Garden Theater	—
March 30, 2026	Tokyo	Japan	Zepp Haneda	Metalverse
April 4, 2026	Kawasaki	Japan	Higashi-Ougishima Higashi Kouen	—
Europe
June 3, 2026 (Note: This show is a part of the Sweden Rock Festival 2026)	Stockholm	Sweden	Norje Havsbad	—
June 5, 2026 (Note: This show is a part of the Rock am Ring and Rock im Park Festival 2026)	Nürburg	Germany	Nürburging	—
June 7, 2026 (Note: This show is a part of the Rock am Ring and Rock im Park Festival 2026)	Nuremberg	Germany	Zeppelinfeld	—
June 9, 2026 (Note: This show is a part of the Kufstein Music Festival 2026)	Kufstein	Austria	Festung Kufstein	—
June 11, 2026 (Note: This show is a part of the Rock for people Festival 2026)	Hradec Králové	Czechia	Park 360	—
June 13, 2026 (Note: This show is a part of the 2026 Download Festival)	Castle Donington	England	Donington Park	—
June 16, 2026	Hanover	Germany	Swiss Life Hall	—
June 18, 2026 (Note: This show is a part of the 2026 Summer Punch Festival)	Warsaw	Poland	Letnia Scena Progesji	—
June 20, 2026 (Note: This show is a part of the 2026 Grospop Metal Meeting)	Dessel	Belgium	Festivalterrein Stenehei	—
June 24, 2026 (Note: This show is a part of the 2026 Tons of Rock)	Oslo	Norway	Ekebergsletta	—
June 26, 2026 (Note: This show is a part of the 2026 Impericon Festival)	Leipzig	Germany	Messehalle 1	—
June 27, 2026 (Note: This show is a part of the 2026 Copenhell)	Copenhagen	Denmark	Refshaleøen	—
July 1, 2026	Istanbul	Turkey	Life Park	—
Asia
August 9, 2026 (Note: This show is a part of the LuckyFes'26)	Hitachinaka	Japan	Hitachi Seaside Park	—
August 14, 2026 (Note: This show is a part of the 2026 Summer Sonic Festival)	Osaka	Japan	Expo Commemoration Park	—
August 16, 2026	Tokyo	Japan	Makuhari Messe	—
North America
September 2, 2026	Denver	United States	Ball Arena	Halestorm; Violent Vira
September 4, 2026	Chicago	United States	Huntington Bank Pavilion	Halestorm; Violent Vira
September 5, 2026	Noblesville	United States	Ruoff Music Center	Halestorm; Violent Vira
September 7, 2026	Toronto	Canada	RBC Amphitheatre	Halestorm; Violent Vira
September 9, 2026	Holmdel	United States	PNC Bank Arts Center	Halestorm; Violent Vira
September 10, 2026	Mansfield	United States	Xfinity Center	Halestorm; Violent Vira
September 12, 2026	Bristow	United States	Jiffy Lube Live	Halestorm; Violent Vira
September 13, 2026	Raleigh	United States	Coastal Credit Union Music Park at Walnut Creek	Halestorm; Violent Vira
September 15, 2026	Charlotte	United States	Truliant Amphitheater	Halestorm; Violent Vira
September 16, 2026	Alpharetta	United States	Ameris Bank Amphitheatre	Halestorm; Violent Vira
September 18, 2026	Clarkston	United States	Pine Knob Music Theatre	Halestorm; Violent Vira
September 19, 2026 (Note: This show is a part of the 2026 Louder Than Life Festival)	Louisville	United States	Kentucky Exposition Center	—
September 21, 2026	St. Louis	United States	Hollywood Casino Amphitheater	Halestorm; Violent Vira
September 23, 2026	Dallas	United States	Dos Equis Pavilion	Halestorm; Violent Vira
September 25, 2026	The Woodlands	United States	Cynthia Woods Mitchell Pavilion	Halestorm; Violent Vira
September 26, 2026	Austin	United States	Germania Insurance Amphitheater	Halestorm; Violent Vira
September 29, 2026	Albuquerque	United States	First Financial Credit Union Amphitheater	Halestorm; Violent Vira
October 1, 2026	Phoenix	United States	Talking Stick Resort Amphitheatre	Halestorm; Violent Vira
October 3, 2026 (Note: This show is a part of the 2026 Aftershock Festival)	Sacramento	United States	Discovery Park	—
South America
November 28, 2026	São Paulo	Brazil	Espaço Unimed	—
December 1, 2026	Buenos Aires	Argentina	Movistar Arena	—
December 3, 2026	Santiago	Chile	Movistar Arena	—
December 7, 2026	San Miguel	Peru	Multiespacio Costa 21	—
December 12, 2026	Mexico City	Mexico	Estadio Fray Nano	Bilmuri; I Prevail

== Track listing ==
All songs are produced by Kobametal. Additional producers are listed below.

Metal Forth track listing
No.	Title	Writer(s)	Additional producer(s)	Length
1.	"From Me to U" (featuring Poppy)	Jordan Fish; Mk-metal; Moriah Rose Pereira	Fish	3:25
2.	"Ratatata" (with Electric Callboy)	Kevin Ratajczak; Nico Sallach; Daniel Haniß; Pascal Schillo; Mk-metal; Norimetal	Haniß; Ratajczak; Sallach; Schillo; Manuel Runner^{[a]}	3:37
3.	"Song 3" (with Slaughter to Prevail)	333-metal; Aleksandr Igorevish; Jack Simmons; Nikita Korzhov; Shikolai; Takemetal; Tatsuometal		3:34
4.	"Kon! Kon!" (featuring Bloodywood)	Jayant Bhadula; Karan Katiyar; Mk-metal; Raoul Kerr; Ryu-metal		3:55
5.	"KxAxWxAxIxI"	Daiai; Metal Cypher		2:36
6.	"Sunset Kiss" (featuring Polyphia)	Megmetal; Mk-metal		3:33
7.	"My Queen" (featuring Spiritbox)	Courtney LaPlante; Drew Fulk; Mike Stringer; Q-metal; Takemetal; Zakk Cervini	Wzrd Bld; Cervini	3:21
8.	"Algorism"	Algo-metal; Norimetal		3:37
9.	"Metali!!" (メタり！！ Metari!!) (featuring Tom Morello)	Metal-Niki; Norimetal; Ryu-metal		3:28
10.	"White Flame -白炎-"	Kitsune of Metal God^{[b]}; Mish-Mosh; Su-metal; T-metal		4:25
Total length:				35:31

Deluxe edition bonus tracks
No.	Title	Writer(s)	Additional producer(s)	Length
11.	"From Me to U" (featuring Poppy) (Major Lazer remix)	Fish; Mk-metal; Pereira	Fish	2:07
12.	"From Me to U" (featuring Poppy) (Jordan Fish remix)	Fish; Mk-metal; Pereira	Fish	3:30
13.	"From Me to U" (featuring Poppy) (live from the O2)	Fish; Mk-metal; Pereira	Fish	4:32
14.	"My Queen" (featuring Spiritbox) (live from Intuit Dome)	LaPlante; Fulk; Stringer; Q-metal; Takemetal; Cervini	Wzrd Bld; Cervini	4:07
15.	"Algorism" (live from Saitama Super Arena)	Algo-metal; Norimetal		3:57
Total length:				53:44

=== Notes ===
- ^{^[a]} signifies a co-producer.
- ^{^[b]} "Kitsune of Metal God" refers to a god figure frequently mentioned in band materials and interviews (often as "Kitsune-sama" or the "Fox God"). Official credits under this name are registered to Kobametal.
- "From Me to U" is stylized in lower case.
- "Ratatata" and "Metali!!" are stylized in all caps.
- The three U.S. DTC digital editions (episodes 1-3) include exclusive selections of track-by-track commentary as well as "Sunset Kiss" (live from the O2).

== Personnel ==
Credits adapted from Tidal.

=== Babymetal ===
- Su-metal – vocals
- Moametal – vocals (tracks 1–6, 8–10)
- Momometal – vocals (1–6, 8–10)

=== Additional musicians ===
- Jordan Fish – guitar (1)
- Julian Gargiulo – guitar (1)
- Stephen Harrison – guitar (1)
- Poppy – vocals (1)
- Daniel Klossek – bass (2)
- David Friedrich – drums (2)
- Daniel Haniß – guitar (2)
- Pascal Schillo – guitar (2)
- Kevin Ratajczak – vocals (2)
- Nico Sallach – vocals (2)
- Jack Simmons – guitar (3)
- Matthew K. Heafy – shamisen (3)
- Alex Terrible – vocals (3)
- Karan Katiyar – guitar (4)
- Jayant Bhadula – vocals (4)
- Raoul Kerr – vocals (4)
- Daidai – guitar (5)
- Megmetal – guitar, programming (6, 8, 9); bass (8, 9); arrangement (8, 9)
- Scott LePage – guitar (6)
- Tim Henson – guitar (6)
- Mike Stringer – guitar (7)
- Courtney LaPlante – vocals (7)
- Ryu-metal – guitar, programming (9)
- Tom Morello – guitar (9)
- Leda – guitar, bass (10)
- Tatsuometal – programming (10); arrangement (10)
- Kyotometal – arrangement (10)

=== Technical ===
- Ted Jensen – mastering
- Zakk Cervini – mixing (1, 7), engineering (7)
- Daniel Haniß – mixing (2)
- Egor Krotov – mixing (3)
- Karan Katiyar – mixing (4)
- Tsubasa Ishibashi – mixing (5)
- Megmetal – mixing (6, 8, 9)
- Tue Madsen – mixing (10)
- Watametal – engineering
- Drew Fulk – engineering, additional mixing (7)
- Julian Gargiulo – engineering, additional mixing (7)
- Josh Gilbert – engineering (7)

== Charts ==
=== Weekly charts ===
Weekly chart performance for Metal Forth
Chart (2025)	Peak position
Australian Albums (ARIA)	31
Austrian Albums (Ö3 Austria)	7
Belgian Albums (Ultratop Flanders)	35
Belgian Albums (Ultratop Wallonia)	6
Dutch Albums (Album Top 100)	29
Finnish Albums (Suomen virallinen lista)	47
French Albums (SNEP)	79
French Rock & Metal Albums (SNEP)	5
German Albums (Offizielle Top 100)	7
German Rock & Metal Albums (Offizielle Top 100)	3
Japanese Albums (Oricon)	3
Japanese Combined Albums (Oricon)	3
Japanese Rock Albums (Oricon)	1
Japanese Hot Albums (Billboard)	15
Scottish Albums (Official Charts)	6
Spanish Albums (Promusicae)	85
Swedish Physical Albums (Sverigetopplistan)	9
Swiss Albums (Schweizer Hitparade)	10
UK Albums (Official Charts)	17
UK Rock & Metal Albums (Official Charts)	2
US Billboard 200	9
US Top Rock & Alternative Albums (Billboard)	2
US World Albums (Billboard)	1

=== Monthly charts ===
Monthly chart performance for Metal Forth
Chart (2025)	Position
Japanese Albums (Oricon)	8
Japanese Rock Albums (Oricon)	2

=== Year-end charts ===
Year-end chart performance for Metal Forth
Chart (2025)	Position
Japanese Download Albums (Billboard Japan)	28

== Release history ==
Release dates and formats for Metal Forth
Region	Date	Label	Format	Edition(s)	Ref.
Japan	August 8, 2025	Universal Music Japan; Amuse, Inc.; BMW Fox Records; Capitol Records	CD; LP; streaming; digital download	Standard; DTC; "The One" limited	
Various	August 8, 2025	Amuse, Inc.; BMW Fox Records; Capitol Records	CD; streaming; digital download	Standard	
United States	August 8, 2025	Amuse, Inc.; BMW Fox Records; Capitol Records	Digital download; cassette; LP	Standard; DTC	
Various	June 26, 2026	Amuse, Inc.; BMW Fox Records; Capitol Records	Streaming; digital download; LP	Deluxe	
Japan	August 5, 2026	Universal Music Japan; Amuse, Inc.; BMW Fox Records; Capitol Records	LP	Deluxe	
