= Babymetal World Tour 2016: Legend Metal Resistance =

2016 concert tour by Babymetal

- World tour by Babymetal
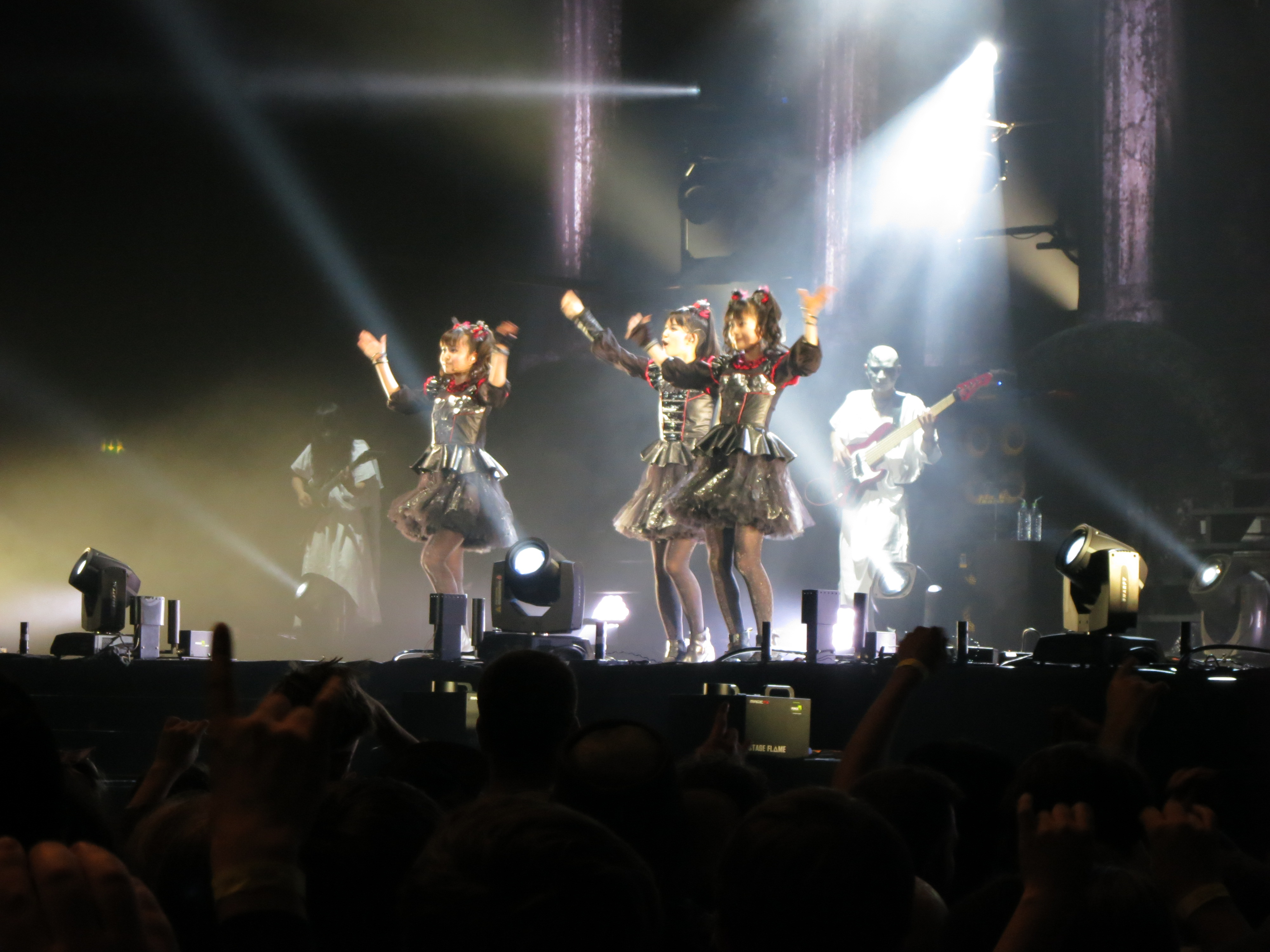
- Babymetal performing in London on April 2, 2016
- Location: North America; Europe; Asia
- Associated album: Metal Resistance
- Start date: April 2, 2016
- End date: September 20, 2016
- Legs: 6
- No. of shows: 13 in North America; 8 in Europe; 14 in Asia; 35 in total

Babymetal concert chronology
- Babymetal World Tour 2015 (2015); Babymetal World Tour 2016: Legend Metal Resistance (2016); The Five Fox Festival in Japan (2017)

The Babymetal World Tour 2016: Legend Metal Resistance (stylized as BABYMETAL WORLD TOUR 2016 LEGEND - METAL RESISTANCE -) was the third worldwide concert tour by Japanese band Babymetal. Supporting their second album Metal Resistance (2016), the tour ran from April 2, 2016 to September 20, 2016, taking place in Japan, the United States, and several countries in Europe. The tour commenced the day after the worldwide release of Metal Resistance on April 1, 2016.

== Background ==
On December 13, 2015, a YouTube video was posted on the band's official channel for the previously untitled album, announced with its April 1 release dubbed "Fox Day". Simultaneously, a 2016 world tour was also announced, set to begin at Wembley Arena on April 2, 2016, the day after the album's worldwide release, and end at Tokyo Dome on September 19, 2016. On June 3, 2016, another date was announced for Tokyo Dome, extending the tour to September 20. The first American leg of the tour was confirmed shortly afterwards, with the band announcing tour dates set on the East Coast and planning later dates on the West Coast.

Tour dates for the European leg and second American leg of the tour were announced on the band's website on March 1, 2016, including a performance at Download Festival in Paris. Prior to the commencement of the American leg, the band made their first appearance on American television, performing "Gimme Chocolate!!" on The Late Show with Stephen Colbert. Most shows for the North American leg were sold out, with the remaining shows limited in tickets, notable since Japanese music, despite being the world's second-largest music industry, has little international following.

== Development ==
As stated by Moametal, the band's goal for the tour was to bring metal music to people regardless of their nationality, gender, or age. According to Yuimetal, the band members will "grow as a bigger band by experiencing this upcoming world tour so that [they] can come back to Japan and play at a huge venue as Tokyo Dome". Su-metal stated the desire to develop the new songs from Metal Resistance.

We think our songs and performances are developed by experiencing how the audience react and get excited at our shows. In our world tour, we'll be performing new songs from the new album so we're looking forward to see how we brush up and grow by taking in everything from every new performance we do.

== Critical response ==
Graham Hartmann of Loudwire positively reviewed the band's performance in New York City on May 4, 2016. Describing the concert as "stripped-down" and featuring highlights from their first two albums, he called the show "refreshing" how little production was put on the performance, noting how the vocal performance was not perfect. Regardless, he praised the girls' choreography and the instrumentals of the supporting Kami Band. Ben Ratliff of The New York Times described the set list as becoming "a little more knowing, though no less weird", calling "Amore" a highlight of the show, while noting that the appeal for the band was "energy and melody, and the work of skilled songwriters". Jason Roche of L.A. Weekly described the show in Los Angeles on July 15 as "more of a community center lock-in party than a Friday night out getting drinks and watching a band", highlighting Nakamoto's vocal performance. Although he praised the vocals that of Mizuno and Kikuchi, he stated that their stage presence is highlighted more by their "endless energy". He also noted that the show ran for a full 80 minutes with no break between sets, while the audience "stuck with the band through every song, their energy level never wavering".

== Broadcast and recording ==
The concert at Wembley Arena on April 2 was broadcast live to 24,000 people in Japan at Zepp Sapporo, Zepp Fukuoka, and delayed to Tsutaya O-East, which screened for an audience of 12,000. Japanese television station WOWOW broadcast the concert at Wembley Arena, as well as the performance at the 2016 Rock in Japan Festival on August 6, and both shows at Tokyo Dome on September 19 and 20. These shows were also released as live audio and video albums Live at Wembley and Live at Tokyo Dome. The concert at Wembley Arena then premiered on television in the United Kingdom on Sky Arts on July 6, 2019.

== Tour dates ==
List of concerts, showing date, city, country, venue, tickets sold, number of available tickets, and amount of gross revenue
Date	City	Country	Venue	Attendance	Revenue
Europe
April 2, 2016	London	England	Wembley Arena	12,000 / 12,500	—
Asia
April 20, 2016 (Note: This concert is a part of the band's "The One" member-exclusive event "Apocrypha: Only the Fox God Knows". As with the nature of Apocrypha, these shows are not listed as tour dates.)	Tokyo	Japan	Studio Coast	—	—
April 21, 2016	Tokyo	Japan	Studio Coast	—	—
North America
May 4, 2016	New York City	United States	PlayStation Theater	2,150 / 2,150	$103,010
May 5, 2016	Boston	United States	House of Blues	2,425 / 2,508	$92,050
May 7, 2016	Philadelphia	United States	Electric Factory	—	—
May 8, 2016 (Note: The concert of May 8, 2016 in Concord, United States at the Charlotte Motor Speedway is a part of Carolina Rebellion 2016.)	Concord	United States	Charlotte Motor Speedway	—	—
May 10, 2016	Silver Spring	United States	The Fillmore	—	—
May 11, 2016	Detroit	United States	The Fillmore Detroit	—	—
May 13, 2016	Chicago	United States	House of Blues	—	—
May 14, 2016 (Note: The concert of May 14, 2016 in Somerset, United States at the Somerset Amphitheater is a part of Northern Invasion.)	Somerset	United States	Somerset Amphitheater	—	—
Europe
June 2, 2016	Pratteln	Switzerland	Z7	—	—
June 3, 2016 (Note: The concert of June 3, 2016 in Vienna, Austria at Donauinsel Wien is a part of Rock in Vienna.)	Vienna	Austria	Donauinsel Wien	—	—
June 5, 2016 (Note: The concert of June 5, 2016 in Nijmegen, Netherlands at Goffertpark is a part of FortaRock 2016.)	Nijmegen	Netherlands	Goffertpark	—	—
June 7, 2016	Cologne	Germany	Live Music Hall	—	—
June 8, 2016	Stuttgart	Germany	LKA Longhorn	—	—
June 10, 2016 (Note: The concert of June 10, 2016 in Derby, England at Donington Park is a part of Download Festival 2016.)	Derby	England	Donington Park	—	—
June 11, 2016 (Note: The concert of June 11, 2016 in Paris, France at the Longchamp Racecourse is a part of Download Festival Paris 2016.)	Paris	France	Longchamp Racecourse	—	—
North America
July 12, 2016	Seattle	United States	Showbox SoDo	—	—
July 14, 2016	San Francisco	United States	The Regency Center	—	—
July 15, 2016	Los Angeles	United States	Wiltern Theatre	—	—
July 17, 2016 (Note: The concert of July 17, 2016 in Bridgeview, United States at the Toyota Park is a part of Chicago Open Air.)	Bridgeview	United States	Toyota Park	—	—
July 18, 2016 (Note: The concert of July 18, 2016 in Columbus, United States at the Value City Arena is a part of the Alternative Press Music Awards.)	Columbus	United States	Value City Arena	—	—
Asia
July 24, 2016 (Note: The concert of July 24, 2016 in Yuzawa, Japan at the Naeba Ski Resort is a part of Fuji Rock Festival '16.)	Yuzawa	Japan	Naeba Ski Resort	—	—
August 6, 2016 (Note: The concert of August 6, 2016 in Hitachinaka, Japan at the Hitachi Seaside Park is a part of Rock in Japan Festival 2016.)	Hitachinaka	Japan	Hitachi Seaside Park	—	—
August 8, 2016 (Note: This concert is a part of the band's "The One" member-exclusive event "Apocrypha: The White Mass". Attendees were required to bring another person and wear white face paint. As with the nature of Apocrypha, these shows are not listed as tour dates.)	Osaka	Japan	Namba Hatch	—	—
August 9, 2016	Osaka	Japan	Namba Hatch	—	—
August 12, 2016 (Note: The concert of August 12, 2016 in Otaru, Japan at the Hitachi Seaside Park is a part of Rising Sun Rock Festival 2016 in EZO.)	Otaru	Japan	Ishikari Bay New Port	—	—
August 17, 2016	Tokyo	Japan	Zepp Tokyo	—	—
August 18, 2016	Tokyo	Japan	Zepp Tokyo	—	—
August 21, 2016 (Note: The concert of August 21, 2016 in Osaka, Japan at the Sonic Stage is a part of Summer Sonic 2016.)	Osaka	Japan	Sonic Stage	—	—
August 24, 2016	Nagoya	Japan	Zepp Nagoya	—	—
August 25, 2016	Nagoya	Japan	Zepp Nagoya	—	—
September 19, 2016 (Note: The concert of September 19, 2016 in Tokyo, Japan at the Tokyo Dome is billed as "Babymetal World Tour 2016: Legend Metal Resistance – Red Night".)	Tokyo	Japan	Tokyo Dome	—	—
September 20, 2016 (Note: The concert of September 20, 2016 in Tokyo, Japan at the Tokyo Dome is billed as "Babymetal World Tour 2016: Legend Metal Resistance – Black Night".)	Tokyo	Japan	Tokyo Dome	—	—
