= Violent Vira =

American singer-songwriter

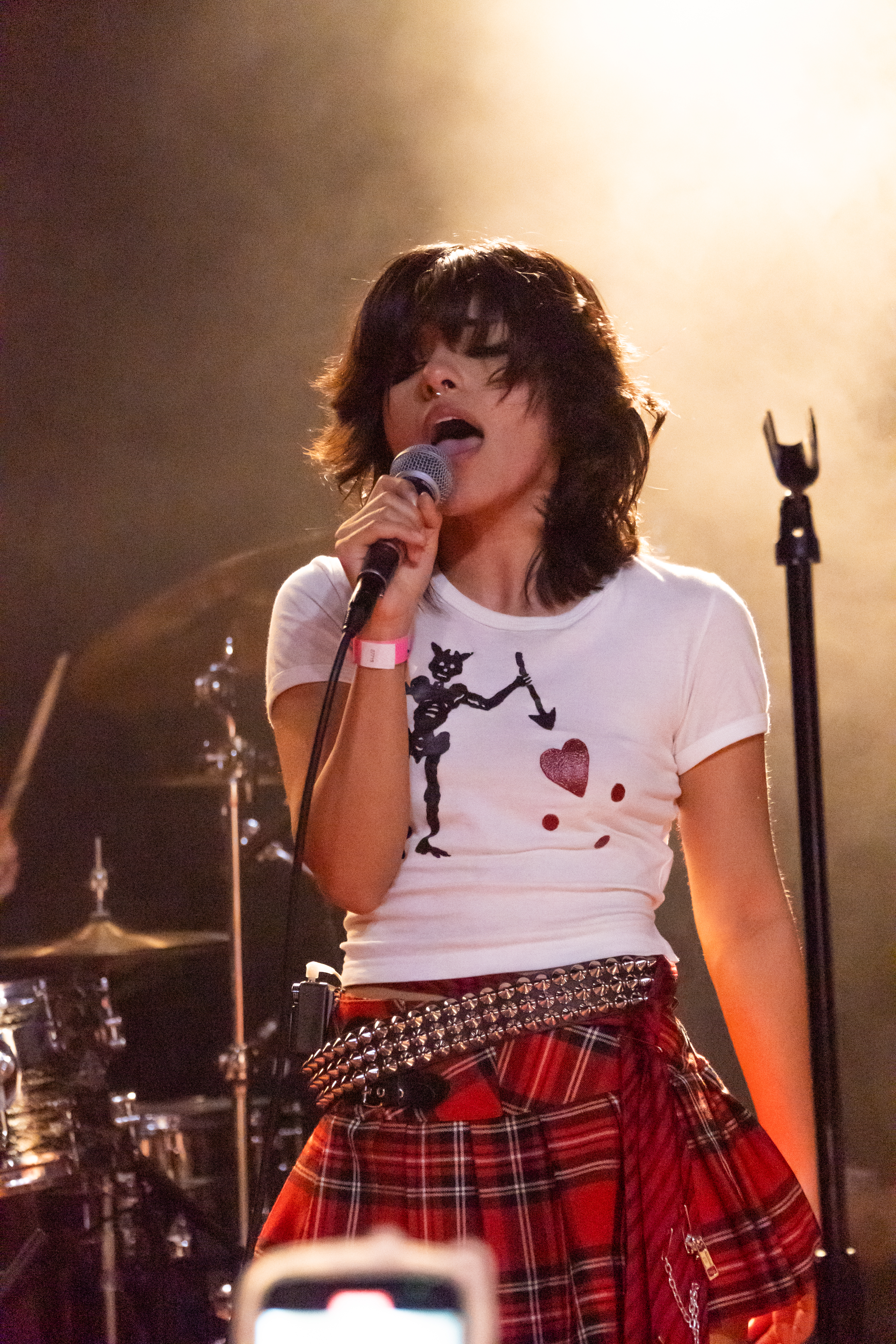
- Violent Vira performing in Albuquerque, New Mexico in 2024

Background information
- Born: Amy Gonzalez; August 27, 2000 (age 26); Boise, Idaho
- Genres: Alternative metal, Alternative rock
- Occupation: Singer-songwriter
- Years active: 2021-present
- Label: Mom + Pop Music
- Website: https://www.violentvira.com

Amy Gonzalez (born August 27, 2000), known professionally as Violent Vira, is an American alternative rock and heavy metal singer-songwriter. Her debut full-length album Lover of a Ghost was released in November 2025.

== Career ==
Gonzalez was born in Boise, Idaho to parents who had emigrated from Mexico. She adopted the stage name Violent Vira after a manga character, and determined to make music with lyrical themes of grief, inner conflict, religion, and identity; with visual themes from goth and horror. She released her debut single "I Don't Care" independently in September 2021. This was followed by her first EP, Till' Death Was Never Enough, in August 2023.

Gonzalez relocated to Dallas, Texas and assembled a backing band for live performances. In 2025 she signed with the independent label Mom + Pop Music, releasing the singles "Saccharine" and "Common Decency". Those tracks were produced by Jennifer Decilveo. Reviewers noted that the songs marked a shift into heavier alternative metal sounds.

Violent Vira completed a tour with her backing band in the second half of 2025, which included several high-profile festival appearances. One reviewer favorably compared Gonzalez's stage presence and singing style to Lacey Sturm. Glasse Factory named Violent Vira its Artist of the Month in October 2025 and discussed her combination of grunge, emo, and heavy metal influences.

Her debut full-length album Lover of a Ghost was released in November 2025. Reviewers noted her mix of strong and soft vocals, with comparisons to Hayley Williams and Morgan Lander. In early 2026, Violent Vira toured as the support act for Kim Dracula in Europe and the United Kingdom. Later in 2026, she toured North America and Latin America as the opening act for Babymetal, alongside fellow openers Halestorm.

== Discography ==
- Till' Death Was Never Enough (EP, 2023)
- Lover of a Ghost (2025)
