= The Other One (Babymetal album) =

Studio album by Babymetal
- Released: March 24, 2023
- Genres: Kawaii metal; J-pop; metalcore
- Length: 41:11
- Labels: Babymetal; Amuse; Toy's Factory; Cooking Vinyl America; 5B
- Producer: Kobametal

Babymetal chronology
10 Babymetal Budokan (2021)	The Other One (2023)	Babymetal Returns: The Other One (2023)

Singles from The Other One
- 1. "Divine Attack (Shingeki)" Released: October 20, 2022; 2. "Monochrome" Released: November 17, 2022; 3. "Metal Kingdom" Released: January 19, 2023; 4. "Light and Darkness" Released: February 23, 2023; 5. "Mirror Mirror" Released: March 23, 2023

The Other One is the fourth (Note: The band considers The Other One to be a "concept album" and not the fourth album, using the latter description to refer to the band's 2025 album Metal Forth.) studio album by Japanese heavy metal band Babymetal. Announced by the band on October 11, 2022 as a concept album, it was released on March 24, 2023 under Babymetal Records, Amuse, Toy's Factory, Cooking Vinyl America, and 5B Records. It is the group's last album as a duo, with Momoko Okazaki (Momometal) joining the band shortly after the album's release.

== Background and release ==
Babymetal announced The Other One on October 11, 2022, and revealed it as a concept album, based on a year-long hiatus that the members of Babymetal took from music, as well as the group's ten-year anniversary. According to a press release:

Last year Babymetal were 'sealed' from the world after a successful 10-year journey. In April 2022, The Other One restoration project began to recover the Babymetal we never knew existed within a virtual world called the Metalverse. A total of 10 songs have been discovered within The Other One restoration project, with each song representing a unique theme based on 10 separate parallel worlds that they have discovered. The upcoming concept album features these all-new tracks for us to experience the other Babymetal story that no one ever knew about.

According to the album's story line, each song describes a parallel world encountered by Su-metal and Moametal during a journey through alternate realities. Su-metal described the album as an attempt to move beyond stereotypical beliefs about the group.

The first single from the album, "Divine Attack (Shingeki)", was released on October 20, 2022. This is the first Babymetal song for which all lyrics were written by singer Su-metal. The second single from the album, "Monochrome", was released on November 17 with a lyric video, a first for the band. On January 19, 2023, the group released the single "Metal Kingdom", along with revealing the track list for the album. The fourth single, "Light and Darkness", was released on February 23, 2023, with a music video from one of their live shows. Their fifth single, "Mirror Mirror", was released with a lyric video one day before the full album release. Babymetal released a music video for the song "Metalizm" on April 21.

== Critical reception ==
Upon its release, the album received generally favorable reviews from critics. Kerrang! noted that "There’s not as much on their fourth album that will raise eyebrows or provoke a laugh, but Babymetal could never iron out all their eccentricity completely." The magazine concluded that "it’s hard not to have fun when every track here feels suitably like its own adventure, and impressively still, Babymetal sound like they've been steering the ship through these parallel universes not for the first time, but for years." DIY Magazine criticized some of the album's glossy production methods, but concluded that it "is mostly a fun, noisy collection [that] does also offer an infinite rabbit hole to dive down."

Distorted Sound noted that the album "might just be Babymetal's best work yet" while serving as a showcase for "what Moametal and Su-metal can do as a duo". Metal Hammer described the album as continuing Babymetal's ongoing experimentation, and while those experiments can get out of hand, the magazine called the album "unquestionably their strongest compendium of delirium to date." According to Punktastic, the album "is another notch in the cap of the duo and their band, an album that manages to wrangle some form of focus from the group's experimental chaos with more comprehensive songwriting and production." Alec Chillingworth from Louder said that "Time Wave" sounds like a Basshunter with metal sound.

In June 2023, Alternative Press published an unranked list of the top 25 albums of the year to date and included this release, calling it "the metal version of falling into a weird and wonderful internet wormhole".

== Track listing ==
No.	Title	Lyrics	Music	Arrangement	Length
1.	"Metal Kingdom"	Kitsune of Metal God^{[a]}	Tatsuometal	Tatsuometal	5:51
2.	"Divine Attack (Shingeki)" (Divine Attack - 神撃 -)	Su-metal	Hayametal; Megmetal	Hayametal; Megmetal	3:39
3.	"Mirror Mirror"	Ryu-metal; The Other Metal	Ryu-metal	Megmetal	3:50
4.	"Maya"	Maya-metal	Kanametal; Megmetal	Megmetal	3:23
5.	"Time Wave"	Mk-metal; T-metal	Tatsuometal	Tatsuometal	4:50
6.	"Believing"	Peri-metal	Yuppemetal	Yuppemetal	3:47
7.	"Metalizm"	Metalian; Ryu-metal	Megmetal; Ryu-metal	Megmetal	3:34
8.	"Monochrome"	Mk-metal	Yuppemetal	Yuppemetal	3:57
9.	"Light and Darkness"	Mk-metal; Takemetal	Takemetal	Tatsuometal	4:04
10.	"The Legend"	Kitsune of Metal God^{[a]}	Megmetal; Ryu-metal	Megmetal	4:18
Total length:					41:11

"The Other One" limited "Clear Box" edition Blu-ray
No.	Title	Length
1.	"Metal Kingdom" (music video)
2.	"Divine Attack (Shingeki)" (visualizer video)
3.	"Mirror Mirror" (lyric video)
4.	"Monochrome" (lyric video)
5.	"Light and Darkness" (music video)

Notes

- ^{^[a]}"Kitsune of Metal God" refers to a god figure frequently mentioned in band materials and interviews (often as "Kitsune-sama" or the "Fox God"). Official credits under this name are registered to Kobametal.
- "Metal Kingdom", "Maya", "Metalizm", and "The Legend" are stylized in all caps.

== Personnel ==
- Suzuka Nakamoto (Su-metal) – lead vocals
- Moa Kikuchi (Moametal) – background vocals

== Charts ==
=== Weekly charts ===
Weekly chart performance for The Other One
Chart (2023)	Peak position
Australian Digital Albums (ARIA)	14
Australian Physical Albums (ARIA)	14
Belgian Albums (Ultratop Flanders)	120
Belgian Albums (Ultratop Wallonia)	97
German Albums (Offizielle Top 100)	24
Japanese Albums (Oricon)	3
Japanese Combined Albums (Oricon)	3
Japanese Hot Albums (Billboard Japan)	3
Scottish Albums (Official Charts)	7
Swiss Albums (Schweizer Hitparade)	76
UK Albums (Official Charts)	32
UK Independent Albums (Official Charts)	1
UK Rock & Metal Albums (Official Charts)	3
US Top Album Sales (Billboard)	23
US Top Current Album Sales (Billboard)	20
US Top Hard Rock Albums (Billboard)	15
US Independent Albums (Billboard)	48
US World Albums (Billboard)	8

=== Monthly charts ===
Monthly chart performance for The Other One
Chart (2023)	Peak position
Japanese Albums (Oricon)	9

=== Year-end charts ===
Year-end chart performance for The Other One
Chart (2023)	Position
Japanese Hot Albums (Billboard Japan)	72
