= Momoko Okazaki =

Japanese musician (born 2003)

Momoko Okazaki 岡崎 百々子
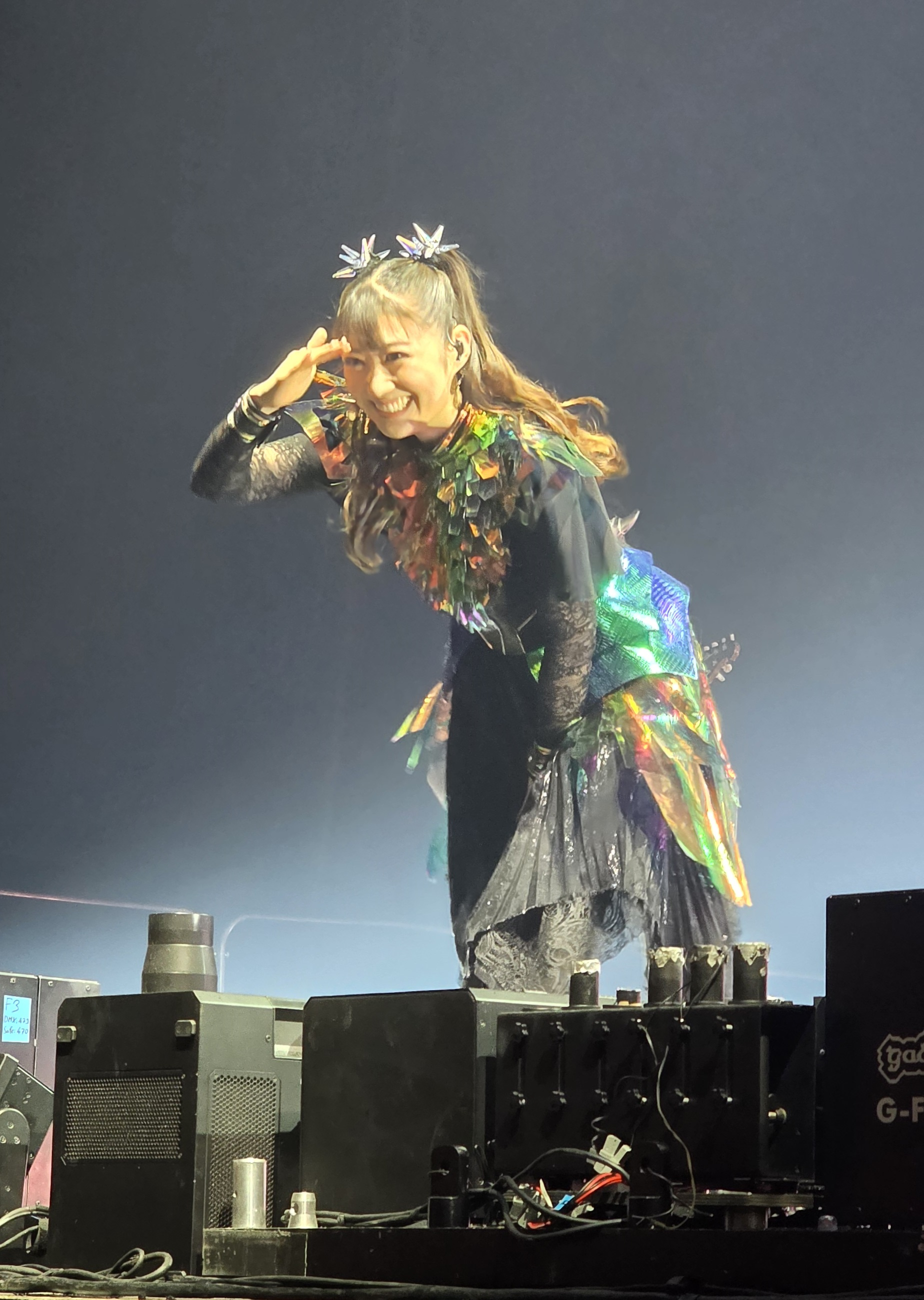
- Okazaki performing in May 2025

Background information
- Also known as: Momometal
- Born: March 3, 2003 (age 23); Fukuoka Prefecture, Japan
- Origin: Kanagawa Prefecture, Japan
- Genres: Kawaii metal; heavy metal; J-pop
- Occupations: Singer; dancer
- Years active: 2015–present
- Member of: Babymetal
- Formerly of: Sakura Gakuin

Momoko Okazaki (岡崎 百々子, Okazaki Momoko; born March 3, 2003), known by her stage name Momometal, is a Japanese singer and dancer. She is best known as a member of kawaii metal band Babymetal, which she joined as a touring member in 2019 before becoming an official member in 2023. She was previously a member of the idol group Sakura Gakuin and is represented by the talent agency Amuse Inc.

== Early life ==
Okazaki was born in Fukuoka Prefecture on March 3, 2003, the second daughter of comedian Hanamaru Hakata. She moved with her family to Kanagawa Prefecture at the age of three.

== Career ==
Okazaki was signed to the talent agency Amuse Inc. in 2014, and started her musical career in May 2015 by joining its female idol group Sakura Gakuin. She was part of its sub-units the Cooking Club "Mini Pati" and the Science Club "Kagaku Kyūmei Kikō Logica?". She was also known for being part of a trio called KYG with Maaya Asō and Kano Fujihira, with Okazaki representing the "G". At the transfer ceremony in 2017, she was appointed as the Perseverance ("Ganbare") Chairman.

In addition to her activities in Sakura Gakuin, Okazaki was a regular model for the fashion magazine Love Berry and an actress. From December 2017 to February 2018, she played the role of Elizabeth Midford in the musical Black Butler: Tango on the Campania.

On March 24, 2018, she left Sakura Gakuin with the live performance "The Road to Graduation 2017 Final: Sakura Gakuin 2017 Graduation", ended her contract with Amuse Inc. at the end of the same month, and announced she would be studying English abroad. In total, she had released three albums with Sakura Gakuin.

In 2019, Okazaki became one of three support dancers for Babymetal, who would take turns filling in as the third dancer for the band's three-person dance choreography following the departure of original band member Yuimetal due to unspecified health concerns. She made her first appearance with the band at the 2019 Super Slippa festival in Taiwan, and later appeared in the music videos for "Da Da Dance" and "Light and Darkness". In August 2021, Babymetal announced it would go on hiatus, and during that time, Okazaki participated in the South Korean survival reality show Girls Planet 999.

Okazaki was officially announced as Babymetal's new member on April 1, 2023, taking the stage name "Momometal". Her first recorded vocals were featured on August 18, 2023, in the spoken section of the band's digital single "Metali!!" She released her first album with Babymetal, titled Metal Forth, on August 8, 2025.

== Discography ==
=== With Sakura Gakuin ===
- Sakura Gakuin 2015 Nendo: Kirameki no Kakera (2016)
- Sakura Gakuin 2016 Nendo: Yakusoku (2017)
- Sakura Gakuin 2017 Nendo: My Road (2018)

=== With Babymetal ===
- Metal Forth (2025)

== Filmography ==
=== Commercial ===
- Tamagotchi 4U (2015) – Bandai

=== Film ===
- Mischievous Kiss The Movie: High School (イタズラなkiss THE MOVIE ハイスクール編) (2016), Rika Irie
- Saki Achiga-hen: Episode of Side-A (咲-Saki-阿知賀編 episode of side-A) (2018), Hyakka Kurumai
- Heavier Trip (2024), Momometal

=== Television ===
- Saki Achiga-hen: Episode of Side-A (咲-Saki-阿知賀編 episode of side-A) (2017), Hyakka Kurumai
- Girls Planet 999 (2021)

== Theater ==
- Black Butler: Tango on the Campania (2017–2018), Elizabeth Midford
