= Babymetal =

Japanese kawaii metal band

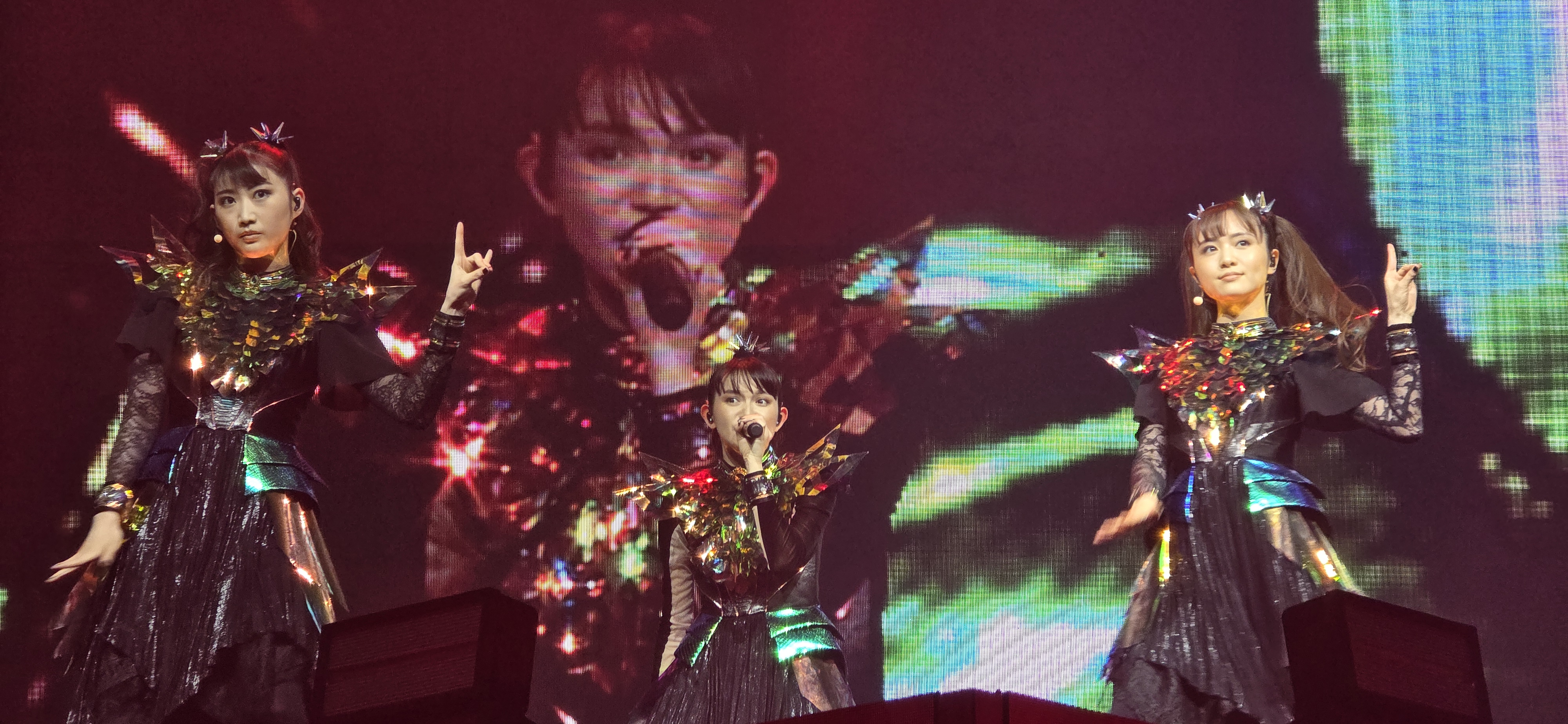
- Babymetal performing in May 2025 (L–R): Momometal, Su-metal, and Moametal

Background information
- Origin: Tokyo, Japan
- Genres: Kawaii metal; J-pop; power metal; alternative metal
- Years active: 2010–present
- Labels: BMD Fox; Toy's Factory; Cooking Vinyl; earMUSIC; Sony Music; Babymetal; Capitol
- Spinoff of: Sakura Gakuin
- Members: Su-metal; Moametal; Momometal
- Past members: Yuimetal
- Website: babymetal.com

Babymetal (Japanese: ベビーメタル, Hepburn: Bebīmetaru), stylized in all caps, is a Japanese kawaii metal band formed in Tokyo in 2010. It consists of Suzuka Nakamoto as "Su-metal" (lead vocals, dancing), Moa Kikuchi as "Moametal" (backing vocals, dancing), and Momoko Okazaki as "Momometal" (backing vocals, dancing). The band is produced by Kobametal from the talent agency Amuse Inc. Their vocals are backed by instrumentation performed by a group of session musicians known as the "Kami Band".

Babymetal was created with the concept of fusing heavy metal with Japanese idol culture, including elaborate choreography. Initially a sub-unit of the Japanese idol group Sakura Gakuin, which features school-aged members who leave upon graduation, the band became an independent act in 2013 following Nakamoto's graduation from Sakura Gakuin. The band originally consisted of Su-metal, Moametal, and Yui Mizuno as "Yuimetal". In 2018, after Mizuno had been absent from live performances for almost a year, Babymetal announced she had left the band due to health issues. During her absence, the band performed with one or more backup dancers; Okazaki, a former member of Sakura Gakuin who had served as one of those backup dancers, officially joined as the third member in 2023.

Babymetal have embarked on several tours, of which a majority have taken place in Europe and the Americas, and have released five studio albums: Babymetal (2014), Metal Resistance (2016), Metal Galaxy (2019), The Other One (2023), and Metal Forth (2025), though they consider The Other One to be a separate concept album and not their fourth studio album. Metal Forth was released in August 2025, and was the first album to feature Okazaki; it signaled a new approach for the band, with seven of its ten tracks being collaborations with artists from various countries, such as Bring Me the Horizon, Electric Callboy, and Tom Morello.

== History ==
=== 2010–2012: Early career ===
In 2009, the band's producer and heavy metal enthusiast Kobametal started planning the launch of a "metal dance unit" that would fuse heavy metal with Japanese idol culture, including elaborate choreography. Impressed by the performance of Suzuka Nakamoto (who was then around 11 or 12 years old) with her previous group Karen Girl's, he believed she would be suitable as the lead vocalist for the new group. The band was formed in 2010 in Tokyo, Japan serving as the heavy music club (重音部, Jūonbu) (sub-unit) of the female idol group Sakura Gakuin, which was also formed that year. The band's name is a combination of "baby" (ベビー, bebī) and "heavy metal" (ヘビーメタル, hebī metaru), and the Japanese pronunciation rhymes with "heavy metal". "Baby" here refers to "the birth of a new genre of music". According to Kobametal, Yui Mizuno and Moa Kikuchi were added to the band to complement Nakamoto's "unique stage presence" with their smaller statures, dancing around her "like angels". None of the three members were familiar with metal music before the inception of the band. Mikiko was put in charge of creating the choreography the three would perform.

Babymetal's first live appearance was on November 28, 2010, at Sakura Gakuin's first solo concert, Sakura Gakuin Festival ☆ 2010. In July 2011, Babymetal premiered the song "Ijime, Dame, Zettai" ("No More Bullying") at a Sakura Gakuin concert, but the song was not released commercially until 2013. The band's first single, "Doki Doki Morning", originally appeared on Sakura Gakuin's debut album Sakura Gakuin 2010 Nendo: Message, released on April 27, 2011. A music video for the song was uploaded to Toy's Factory's YouTube channel on October 12, 2011, and was released as a DVD single in late 2011, under the independent Toy's Factory sublabel Juonbu Records. The music video totaled over 1 million views by the end of 2012.

Babymetal's first CD single was a collaboration with the band Kiba of Akiba, titled "Babymetal / Kiba of Akiba". Released in March 2012 by Juonbu Records, the single ranked at number three on the Oricon weekly indie chart and number one in the Tower Records Shibuya weekly indie ranking. In the summer of 2012, the band released a music video for their next single, "Headbangeeeeerrrrr!!!!!", directed by Hidenobu Tanabe. In August 2012, Babymetal performed at Japan's Summer Sonic Festival, becoming the youngest act ever to perform at the festival. The same year, Babymetal performed outside of Japan for the first time at the 2012 Anime Festival Asia in Singapore.

=== 2013–2015: Major label debut and Babymetal ===
On January 9, 2013, the band debuted on a major record label with "Ijime, Dame, Zettai". Released under the main Toy's Factory label and Juonbu Records, it sold 19,000 copies in its first week and debuted at number six in the Oricon Weekly Singles Chart. In the spring of 2013, Nakamoto graduated from junior high school and therefore had to "graduate" from Sakura Gakuin (a group of elementary and junior high school girls). However, their management decided Babymetal would not dissolve and would continue its activities as a band. The group released its next single, "Megitsune", on June 19, 2013, under Toy's Factory and the band's new sublabel BMD Fox Records. The single also included the song "Onedari Daisakusen" (おねだり大作戦, "Begging Operation") performed by Yuimetal and Moametal under the stage name of Black Babymetal.

On August 10 and 11, 2013, Babymetal again took part in the Summer Sonic Festival, performing both in Chiba and Osaka, Japan. Later, in October, Babymetal also became the youngest artists ever to perform at the heavy metal music festival Loud Park at the Saitama Super Arena in Saitama City, Japan. In November, Babymetal released a promo video for the Japanese premiere of Metallica's movie Through the Never, and released its first live music video Live: Legend I, D, Z Apocalypse, which debuted at seventh place in the weekly Oricon Blu-ray Disc charts, and at second place among music Blu-rays. In December, Babymetal performed at Anime Festival Asia Indonesia 2013 and performed for a second time in Singapore.

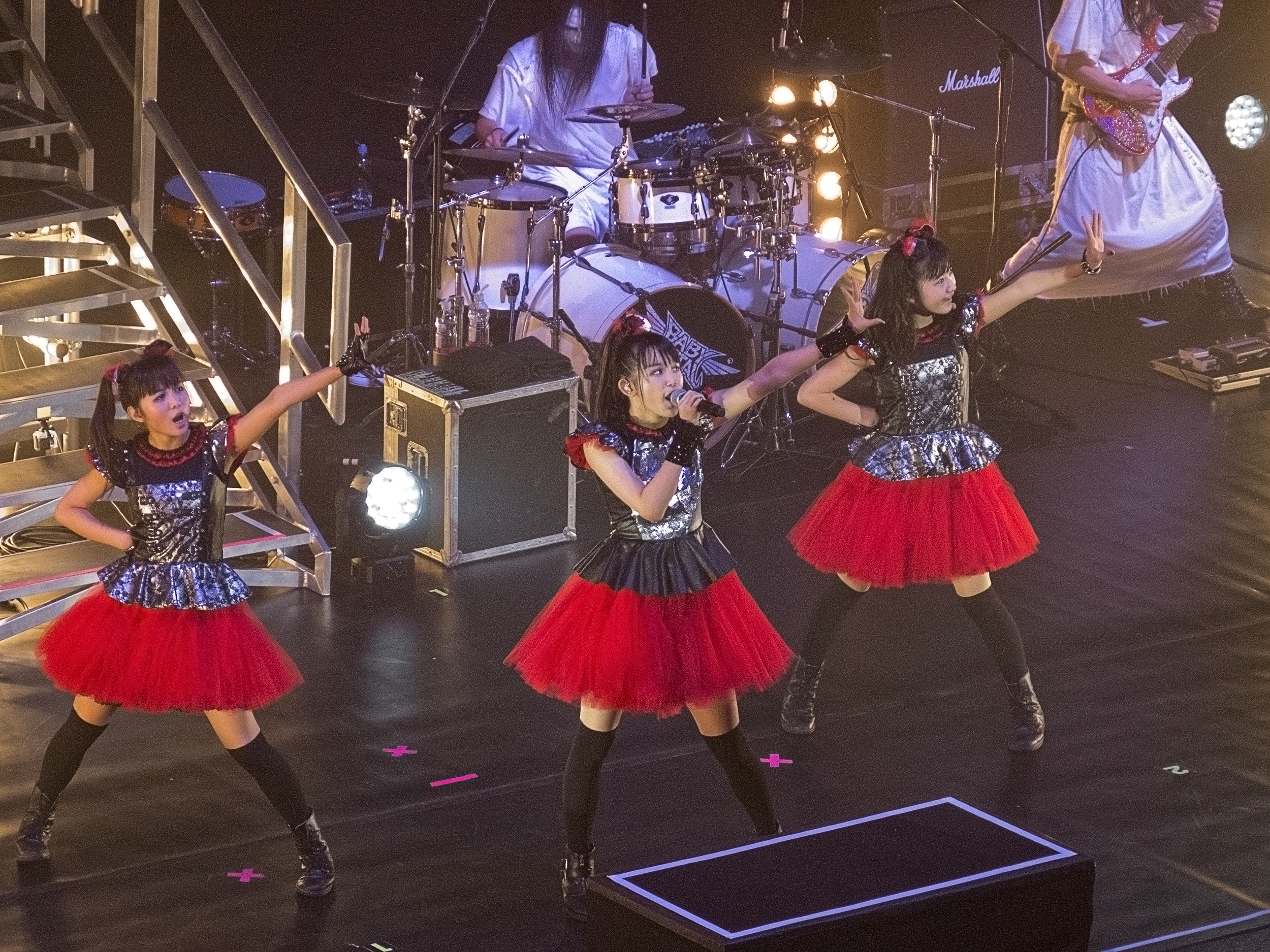
Babymetal performing in London, November 2014; from left to right; Moametal, Su-metal and Yuimetal

On February 26, 2014, Babymetal released their first, eponymous album. It contained thirteen tracks and was also available in a limited edition that included a DVD with music videos and live footage. The album was well received by music critics as well as the public, selling over 37,000 copies in Japan its first week, debuting at number four on the Oricon Weekly Album Chart, and number two in Billboard Japan. It also topped iTunes Metal charts in Germany, the United Kingdom, and the United States, and reached number 187 on the US Billboard 200 chart on March 22. Their album also made it into the Heatseekers chart at number four. On March 1 and 2, 2014, the band played two concerts at the Budokan. With an average age of 14.6 years, they became youngest-ever female act to perform a show there. The two concerts were attended by 20,000 people. On April 3, 2014, an episode of the Fine Brothers' YouTubers React show was uploaded to YouTube, covering the band and the music videos of "Doki Doki Morning", "Iine!", and "Gimme Chocolate!!"; the band members' own reaction to the video would later be released in 2016.

At the end of their concert on March 2, Babymetal also announced their first world tour, the Babymetal World Tour 2014, initially performing in Paris, France and Cologne, Germany. The Sonisphere Festival 2014 at the Knebworth House, England was added to the tour after the band were formally invited to play there following a successful fan campaign called "Babymetal For Sonisphere UK 2014", which Sonisphere later acknowledged on its website. After the UK leg of the tour, the band went on to make their debut appearance in the United States on July 27 with a headlining show at The Fonda Theatre in Hollywood, Los Angeles. They played at the Heavy Montréal in Montreal, Canada on August 9, 2014 alongside Metallica, Slayer, and Anthrax; and performed at the Summer Sonic 2014 in Chiba and Osaka, Japan on the Mountain Stage with bands such as Avenged Sevenfold and Megadeth. Babymetal was also the opening act to five of Lady Gaga's concerts in her ArtRave: The Artpop Ball 2014 tour in August along the Western United States. Babymetal also released their second live album Live: Legend 1999 & 1997 Apocalypse on October 19, 2014, featuring their live performances at both the NHK Hall in Shibuya, Tokyo and at the Makuhari Messe Event Hall in Chiba, Japan from 2013.

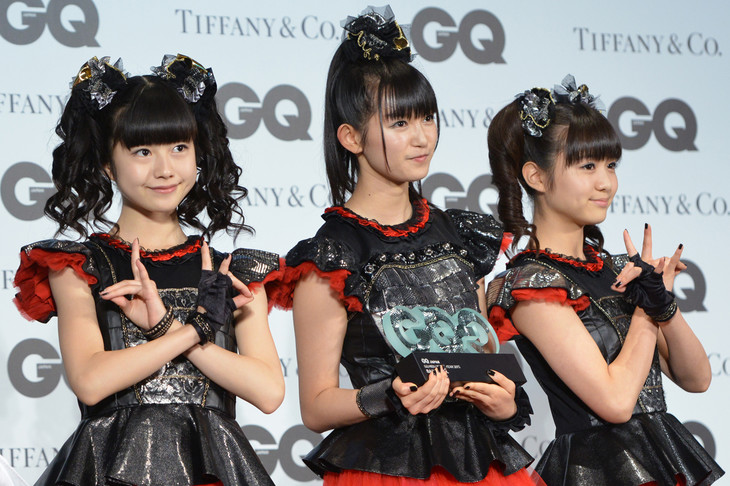
Babymetal at the GQ Men of the Year 2015 ceremony in Tokyo; they won the Special Prize "Discovery of the Year" award.

In August 2014, it was announced the band would play another show at the O2 Academy Brixton in London, England on November 8, 2014, their final European show of the year as part of the group's "Babymetal Apocalypse" phase. It was later announced the band would also return to New York City, which they had visited earlier in the year without giving an actual performance, performing at the Hammerstein Ballroom on November 4. At their Brixton performance, the band debuted a new song titled "Road of Resistance." Later revealed to be a collaboration with Sam Totman and Herman Li of British power metal band DragonForce, the song was subsequently released as a bonus track of their first live album Live at Budokan: Red Night, released simultaneously along with the band's third live video album Live at Budokan: Red Night & Black Night Apocalypse on January 7, 2015, and later released as a digital single. In 2015, they re-released their eponymous album via earMusic and RAL/Sony Music Entertainment. Ahead of their performance at the Metal Hammer Golden Gods Awards on June 15, the trio made a surprise appearance during DragonForce's set at Download Festival at the Donington Park in Leicestershire, England performing "Gimme Chocolate!!", despite event organizer Andy Copping stating he would never book the band.

=== 2016–2017: Touring and Metal Resistance ===
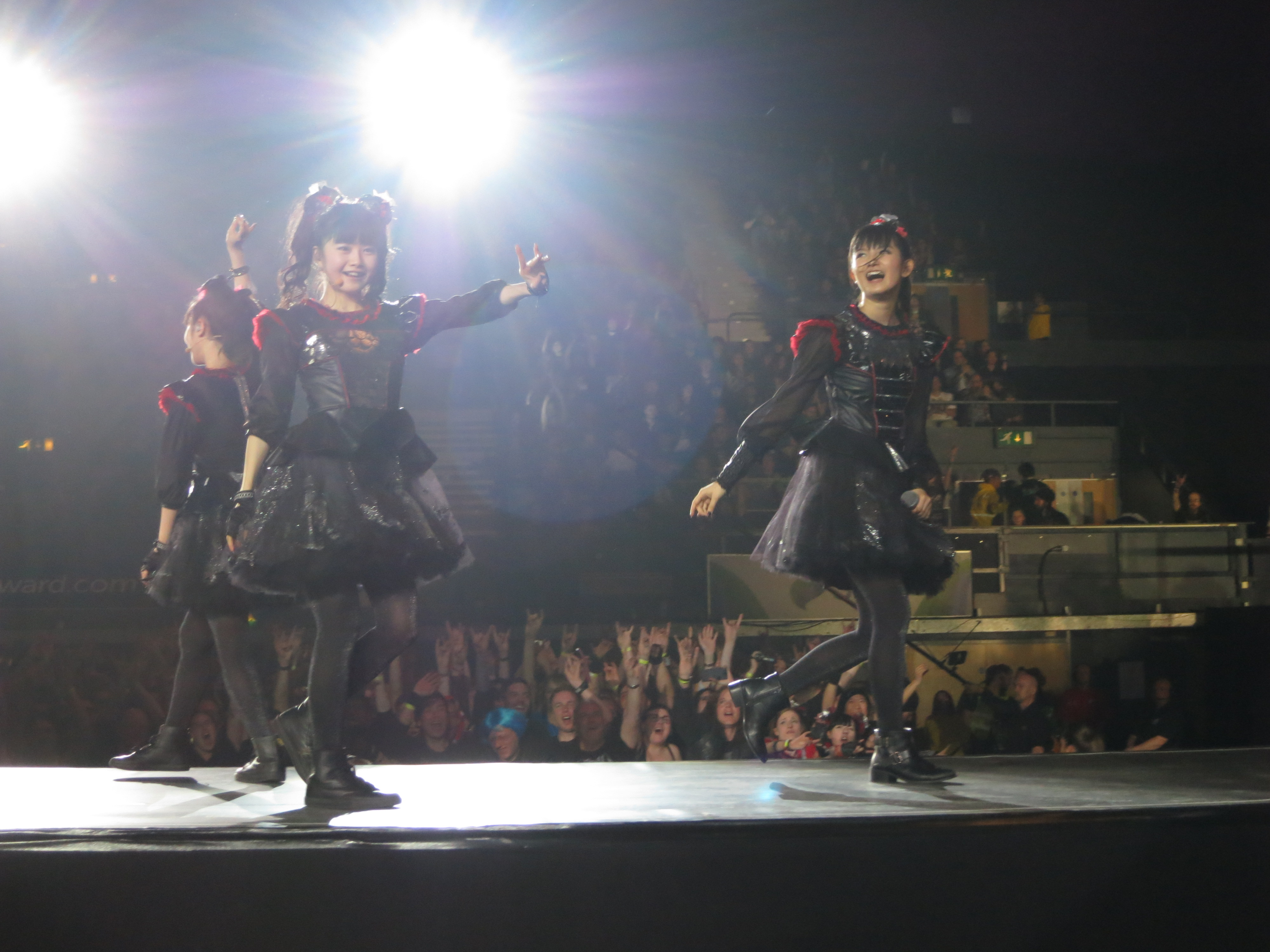
Babymetal performing at the Wembley Arena in London, April 2015

During the band's headlining shows in December 2015 at the Yokohama Arena in Yokohama, Japan, they announced a second studio album to be released on April 1, 2016, as well as a world tour starting at the Wembley Arena in London, England and concluding in Tokyo, Japan with a debut at the Tokyo Dome. On January 15, 2016, the album's title was revealed to be Metal Resistance.

Their second album had shown differences from their debut album. Yuimetal stated that "compared to the first album and definitely the second album they challenged themselves to a lot of new, different types of genres of music, even more than before". Another difference was more use of positive lyrics than ever before. The band made a point to provide a wide variety of styles to attract a wider audience and performed a full song in English.

The band came up with the album title Metal Resistance because they believed it represents who they are and what they do as Babymetal. Su-metal said, "It's about them exploring new, different aspects of what they can do." On March 13, the band's producer, Kobametal, received an Excellence Award from the Association of Media in Digital (AMD) in Japan for his success in promoting the band internationally. On April 2, one day after the release of Metal Resistance, Babymetal became the first Japanese act to headline Wembley Arena, with the largest sale of merchandise for a single day event in the venue's history, coinciding with the highest ever entry for an album in the UK charts for a Japanese act. The Guardian gave their Wembley performance a rating of five out of five stars. On April 5, Babymetal made their U.S. television debut, performing "Gimme Chocolate!!" on The Late Show with Stephen Colbert. Babymetal were added as a character skin in the Wii U video game Super Mario Maker in 2016.

On May 26, 2016, WWE's Triple H announced on Twitter that Babymetal's song "Karate", along with A Day to Remember's "Paranoia", would be used as official theme songs of NXT TakeOver: The End. On July 18, the band made a special appearance at the Alternative Press Music Awards where they performed "Karate" before being joined onstage by Judas Priest frontman Rob Halford. Halford, along with Nakamoto and the Kami Band, performed an abridged version of "Painkiller", followed by a performance of "Breaking the Law" where they were rejoined by Mizuno and Kikuchi on guitars. On July 27, Metal Hammer readers voted Babymetal's debut album as the best album of the 21st century. In September 2016, Warner Bros. announced that a hybrid live action-animation fantasy-adventure short form series featuring the members of the band was under development. The series would be developed by Blue Ribbon Content in collaboration with Amuse Group USA (an Amuse Inc. subsidiary based in the United States). The band's producer, Kobametal, is also involved with production of the series.

On September 19 (Red Night) and September 20, 2016 (Black Night), Babymetal ended their Babymetal World Tour 2016: Legend Metal Resistance by performing at the Tokyo Dome, with both nights sold out and approximately 55,000 people attending each night. These included fans from Japan and many others from around the world. Yuimetal admitted she was "still in shock" that she was playing at the venue. Moametal felt the same, calling it "a big challenge for young girls of our age to stand on that stage". Su-metal explained that "in Japan we have played many big venues like Budokan and others, but Tokyo Dome was always a place that I have been dreaming of performing at." In December 2016, Babymetal supported the Red Hot Chili Peppers during their The Getaway World Tour at The O2 Arena in London, England. During their final show on the tour, Red Hot Chili Peppers drummer Chad Smith joined Babymetal onstage to perform their covers of Judas Priest's songs "Painkiller" and "Breaking the Law". After the performance, Smith thanked Babymetal for being on tour with them and led the audience in singing "Happy Birthday" to Su-metal.

In January 2017, Babymetal supported Metallica for their WorldWired Tour at Gocheok Sky Dome in Seoul, South Korea and also appeared in Japan's performance of the Guns N' Roses' Not in This Lifetime... Tour as the opening act. In April 2017, Babymetal supported the Red Hot Chili Peppers during The Getaway World Tour in the US. In June 2017, Babymetal performed at the KISW Pain in the Grass music event in Auburn, Washington. During the summer of 2017, they supported Korn on their Serenity of Summer Tour. Afterwards, they commenced their The Five Fox Festival in Japan tour.

In October 2017, Babymetal were officially revealed as the performers of the "Unikitty Theme" for the Unikitty! TV series. On December 2 and 3, 2017, Babymetal performed at the Hiroshima Green Arena, with the shows billed Legend "S" Baptism XX. It was the first time the group performed in Su-metal's hometown of Hiroshima, and it was an early coming of age celebration for her, since December 20, 2017 was her 20th birthday (as hinted in the show title), the age of majority in Japan; the lyrics to "Headbangeeeeerrrrr!!!!!", about a girl's fifteenth birthday, were even modified for the occasion. It was also Babymetal's first performance without all three members, as Yuimetal was unable to perform due to illness.

On December 30, 2017, Kami Band guitarist Mikio Fujioka fell from an observation deck; he died from his injuries on January 5, 2018. Babymetal released a eulogy on Twitter on January 9, commemorating his work with the band.

=== 2018–2020: The Chosen Seven era, departure of Yuimetal, Metal Galaxy ===
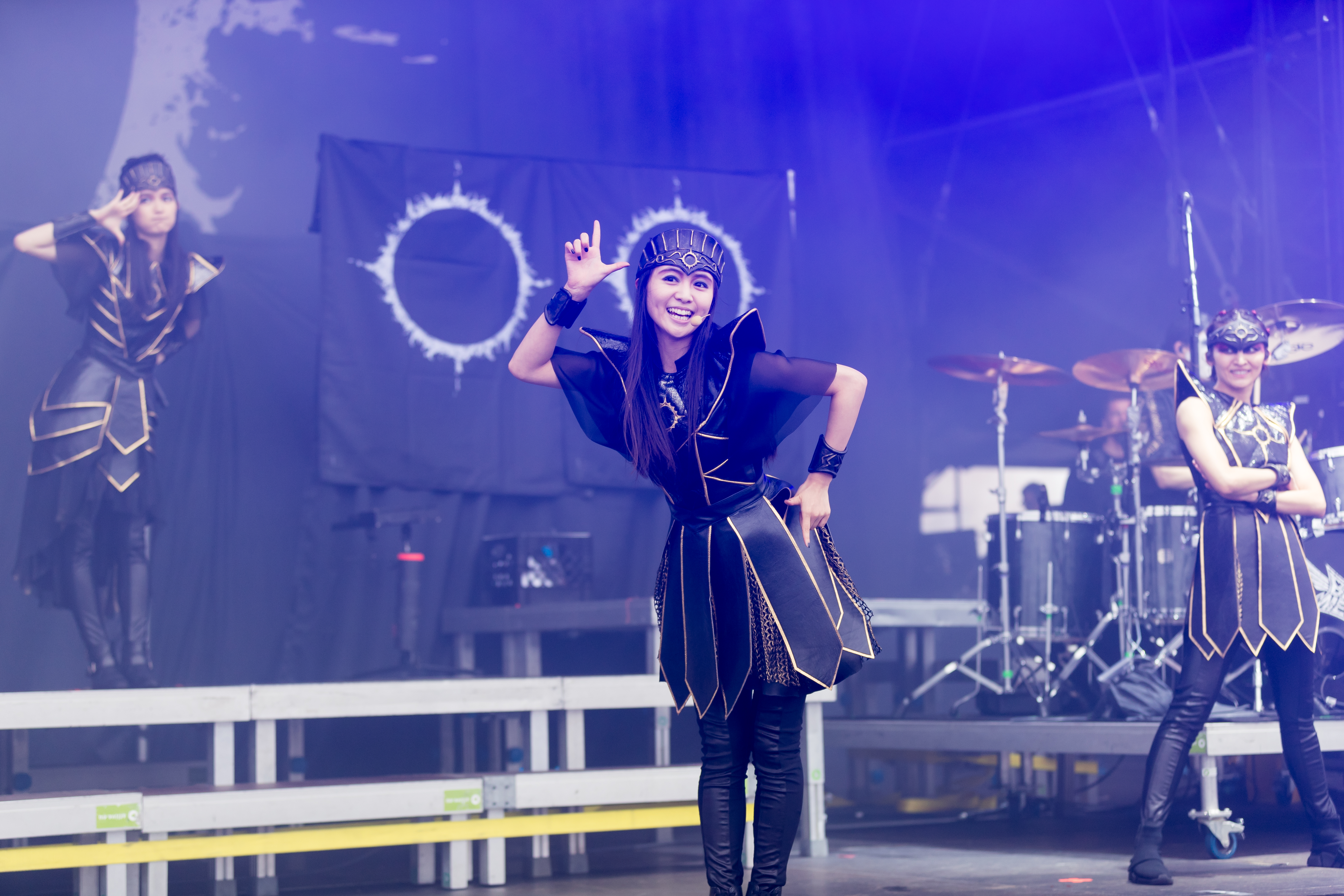
Babymetal performing at Rock am Ring in 2018

On April 1, 2018, Babymetal posted a video to YouTube entitled "Metal Resistance Episode VII – The Revelation". In the video, it is explained that a "dark side" of Babymetal exists, "with seven metal spirits", and that a "new era is about to begin". A graphic novel entitled Apocrypha: The Legend of Babymetal was also announced in the following days. Written by "the Prophet of the Fox God" and Illustrated by GMB Chomichuk, it was released on October 30 by Z2 Comics.

On May 1, 2018, Babymetal announced they were launching their own record label, named Babymetal Records. On May 8, just ahead of the Babymetal World Tour 2018, the band released a music video for a new single, "Distortion". Yuimetal was absent from Babymetal's tour of the United States in May 2018, with no advance warning. Amid fan speculation on Mizuno's status with the group, a representative of 5B Management, the American management company representing Babymetal, replied to an inquiry from Alternative Press Magazine by saying that "Yuimetal remains a member of the band, but she is not on this current U.S. tour." The reply also hinted about "a new narrative for the future of the band which is currently evolving" and a "storyline" that "has changed".

Mizuno remained absent for the rest of their tour, until their agency announced at a shareholders' meeting in June that she had been in poor health since December 2017, and was "currently recovering". On October 19, 2018, shortly before the Japan leg of the tour, the band released a new single, "Starlight". On the same day, the band officially announced Mizuno's departure from the group. Afterward, she released a statement explaining her decision and her desire to pursue a solo career. During their tour, Babymetal also performed at Rock on the Range in Columbus, Ohio, the Download Festival in Donington Park, England, and the Rock am Ring and Rock im Park festivals in Nürburgring and Zeppelinfeld, Germany. On July 9, 2018, the band was declared champion of the Heavy Metal World Cup 2018.

On April 1, 2019, Babymetal announced they would be releasing their third album later that year. On May 10, 2019, the band released the single "Elevator Girl". On May 29, 2019, it was announced Babymetal would perform at the Glastonbury Festival in England on June 30, making them the first Japanese band to play on one of the festival's main stages. Babymetal also revealed plans for their first arena concert in the United States at The Forum in Los Angeles, California, set for October 11, 2019. The date of the concert coinceded with the release date of their third studio album, Metal Galaxy. Their performance at The Forum was compiled into a live album, Live at the Forum, released in DVD and Blu-ray formats on May 13, 2020.

On June 27, 2019, Babymetal released the single "Pa Pa Ya!!", featuring Thai rapper F. Hero, before their concert at Yokohama Arena the same day. The video, released on July 1, featured footage from their concert in Yokohama. It included touring member Kano Fujihira, one of three girls rotating in Yui's place—Kano Fujihira, Riho Sayashi, and Momoko Okazaki—who are known as the "Avengers". Following their performance, they announced the Metal Galaxy World Tour to promote their new album, starting in September 2019, and closing out in March 2020. A scheduled performance at Clockenflap in Hong Kong in November 2019 was canceled due to the 2019–2020 Hong Kong protests. Further concerts in Asia were initially postponed on March 4 due to the COVID-19 pandemic, but were ultimately canceled in June. In April, they streamed two "Stay Home, Stay Metal" shows on YouTube during the pandemic, which consisted of footage from two prior concerts from 2016. Their performances at Makuhari Messe in January 2020 were compiled into the live album Legend – Metal Galaxy, which was released on September 9.

In October 2019, the band became the first Asian act to reach the peak of Billboard Top Rock Albums Chart. In 2020, Babymetal was featured as a guest artist on British rock band Bring Me the Horizon's EP Post Human: Survival Horror, on the song "Kingslayer". On November 16, 2020, NHK announced that Babymetal would take part in the 71st NHK Kōhaku Uta Gassen on New Year's Eve, marking their first appearance in the competition. A poll conducted by Yahoo! Japan ahead of the airing determined that the most anticipated song of the night was Babymetal's performance of "Ijime, Dame, Zettai", with 26.3% of the vote. Participating on the red team, they won with 2,635,200 votes compared to the white team's 1,383,180 votes.

=== 2021–2024: The Other One and Momometal ===
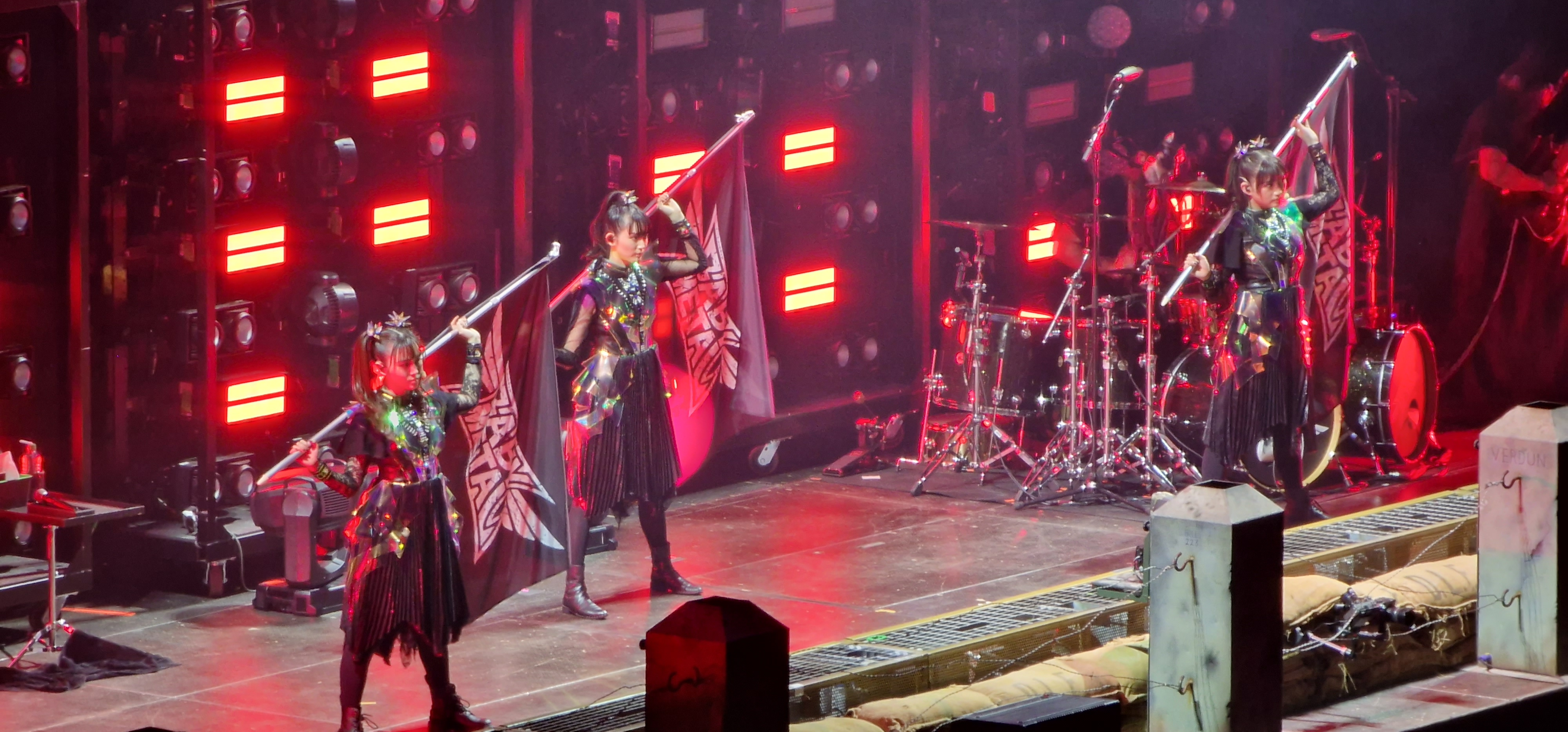
Babymetal performing at the Ziggo Dome in Amsterdam, May 2023

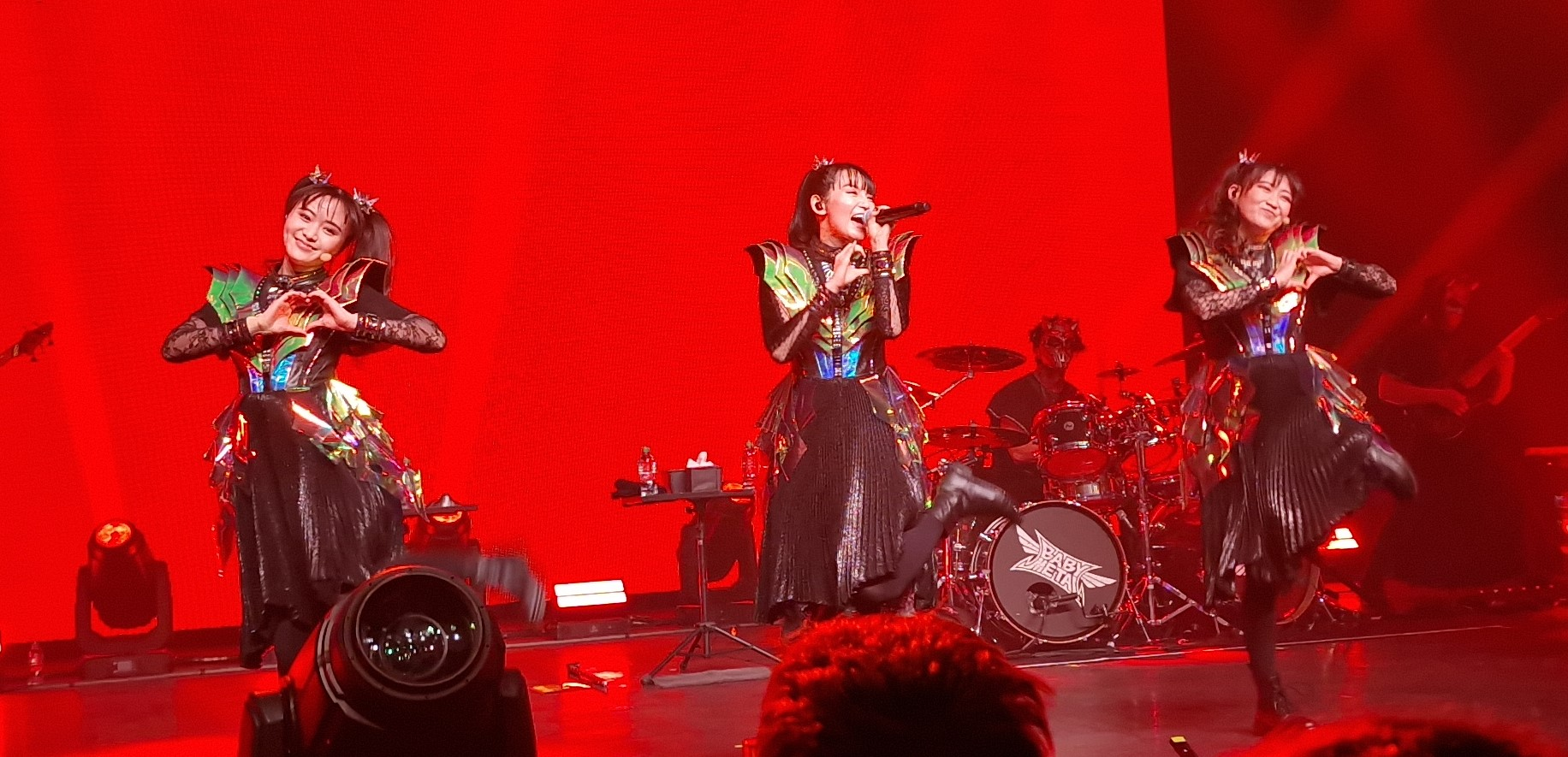
Babymetal performing at Ancienne Belgique in Brussels, December 2023

The band's first retrospective album 10 Babymetal Years was released on December 23, 2020. To celebrate the 10th anniversary of the band's formation, their live videos were released in audio-only vinyl format on August 25, 2021. On October 11, 2021, the band released a cryptic video hinting a hiatus or end of the band with the message "The 3 metal spirits that have been shining since 2010, even if they were to leave Earth, would continue to shine forever in our hearts and across the Metal Galaxy. A legend turns into a myth which turns into a Living Legend... What lies ahead beyond the end of the stairway to becoming a Living Legend is something only the Fox God knows."

Babymetal announced their fourth album The Other One on October 11, 2022, which they revealed to be a concept album. The album was released on March 24, 2023. The lead single from the album, "Divine Attack (Shingeki)" (Japanese: Divine Attack - 神撃 -), was released on October 20, 2022. This is the first Babymetal song for which all lyrics were written by Nakamoto. The second single from the album, "Monochrome", was released on November 17 with a lyric video, a first for the band. On January 19, 2023, Babymetal released the single "Metal Kingdom", along with revealing the track list for The Other One.

On October 18, 2022, Swedish metal band Sabaton announced that Babymetal would perform at their shows for the European leg of their world tour alongside Finnish band Lordi. On January 28 and 29, 2023, Babymetal played at Makuhari Messe, marking their first live concert in nearly two years. They played a total of 13 songs, five of which were from their album The Other One. Footage from the concerts was used for the music video for "Metal Kingdom", which released on February 3, 2023. They released the song "Light And Darkness" on February 23 with an accompanying music video, which likewise consisted of footage from their concerts at Makuhari Messe. On the days prior to the release, they posted two teasers for the video to their YouTube channel.

Nakamoto and Kikuchi performed a piano version of the song "Monochrome" for The First Take, which premiered on their YouTube channel on March 10, 2023. On March 15, the band announced their first tour since 2019, the Babymetal World Tour 2023, where they will play in Asia and Australia. Babymetal released the focus single from their concept album The Other One, "Mirror Mirror", on March 23 with a lyric video. The album released the following day through the record label Cooking Vinyl.

Babymetal's concert at Makuhari Messe in January sparked fan speculation about a potential third member joining the band, with Momoko Okazaki being a popular contender. On April 1, 2023, during Babymetal's performance at Pia Arena MM in Kanagawa, Okazaki was officially announced as the new member of a "reborn Babymetal", adopting the stage name Momometal. Her first video appearance as an official member was the music video for "Mirror Mirror", uploaded to YouTube on April 7, featuring footage from Babymetal's performance at Pia Arena MM. On August 18, 2023, Babymetal released the single "Metali!!" featuring Tom Morello, with Momometal providing a spoken interlude in the song.

Two concerts were held at the Yokohama Arena on March 2 and 3, 2024, under the title of Legend – MM, to celebrate the birthday of Momometal. The first night was titled 20 Night, as she was 20 years old at the time, and the second night was titled 21 Night, coinciding with her 21st birthday. Approximately 30,000 people were in attendance over the two days. On May 23, Babymetal collaborated with German band Electric Callboy on the song "Ratatata". It was subsequently used by WWE as the theme song for the 2024 Bash in Berlin event. The band made a cameo appearance in the Finnish comedy film Heavier Trip, which premiered in September. On December 6, Babymetal was featured on the single "Bekhauf" by the Indian metal band Bloodywood.

=== 2025–present: Metal Forth ===
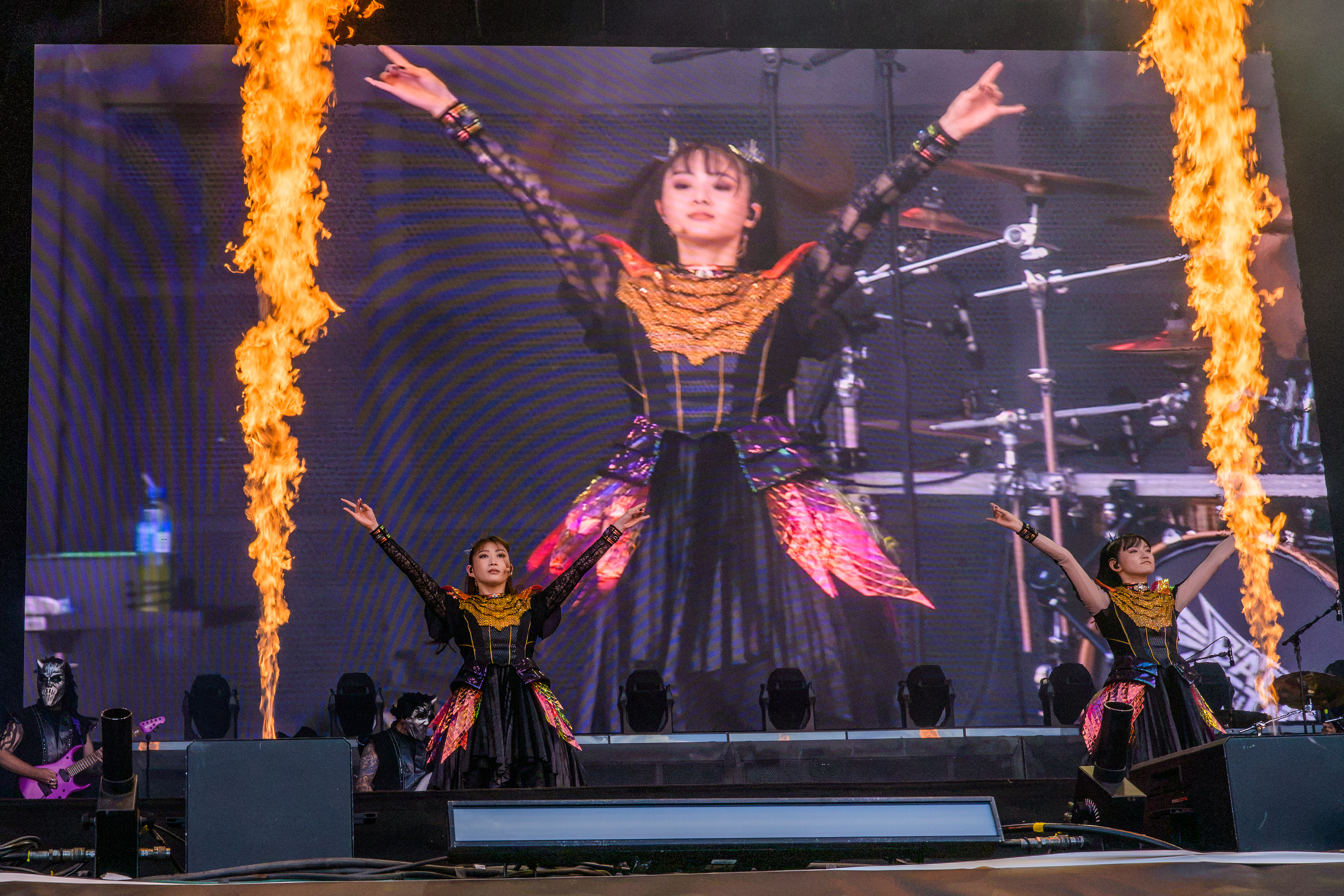
Babymetal performing at Tons of Rock, Oslo, 2026

Since January 4, 2025, the members of Babymetal have hosted the radio show Babymetal's Metal Radio! (Babymetalのメタラジ！, Bebīmetaru no metaraji!) on Tokyo FM, with each episode featuring a new guest talking to the band about their experiences with heavy metal music. A notable episode featured politician Sanae Takaichi, a heavy metal fan and drummer who became Japan's Prime Minister one month later.

On April 1, the band announced their fifth studio album, Metal Forth, (Note: The album's name is a pun reflecting the band's view of it as their fourth studio album, as they regard The Other One as a concept album.) for release on June 13. They also revealed they had signed a global deal with Capitol Records. The album was delayed to June 27, then again to August 8. On May 30, the band became the first Japanese musicians to headline and sell out a show at The O2 Arena in London, which was recorded and released as the concert film Live at the O2 Arena on December 19. Metal Forth became the first release by an all-Japanese band to reach the top 10 of the Billboard 200, where it debuted at No. 9.

In February 2026, Babymetal collaborated with Japanese vocalist Tatsuya Kitani to release "Kasuka na Hana", the opening theme song for the second season of the anime Hell's Paradise. In November, their song "Sunset Kiss" featuring Polyphia was nominated for Best Asian Pop Music Performance at the 69th Annual Grammy Awards.

== Artistry ==
=== Musical style and lyrics ===
In the International Journal of Cultural Studies, Lorraine Plourde contrasted the image of a typical Japanese idol—displaying "pastel and bright colors, light-hearted music content and smiling, inviting faces"—with Babymetal's image, which she described as "a darker (yet still energetic), less accessible and more complex version of cuteness". The band defines its style as a new genre called "kawaii metal" ("kawaii" meaning "cute") and clarifies that it is "a mix of J-pop idol and heavy metal". Critics have labeled the group as alternative metal, death metal, power metal, nu metal, speed metal, and metalcore.

Tristan Peterson of Metal Obsession remarked in his review of the band's debut album "This band was created for the demographic of 'Music that your Japanese Boyfriend/Girlfriend, who doesn't really like Metal, would enjoy.'" as well as "[Babymetal] has made metal cute without losing any of its edge." Patrick St. Michel from Japanese music and culture site MTV 81 praises the "pure, headbang-inducing energy" of the group's live performances and describes their style as a mixture of "seemingly disparate sounds of heavy metal and idol pop, creating music anchored both by throat-mauling screeches and cuddly choruses".

Lyrical themes found in Babymetal's music focus on real-world issues. Also, they give the message of positivity and self-empowerment with the atmosphere of their music containing less serious and playful themes. To be specific, the body image concerns of girls and women pressured by society to remain thin and also bullying, while they also sing about what it is like going to your first concert, the concept of an "ideal woman" and chocolate, subjects which critics say are a step away from typical lyrical styles used by most metal bands.

Writing for the Journal of Popular Music Studies, Sarah Keith and Diane Hughes characterized Babymetal as a "prime example of the genre of idol pop being of girls, but not for girls", exemplifying the broader J-pop trend of performative girlhood. While they remarked on the band sharing many similarities with other idol groups, they also commented on Su-metal's vocal delivery being markedly different from them, as she demonstrates a "strong voice with clear tone and a minimal amount of coloratura or embellishment". The authors noted the disparity in the band's international audiences—stemming primarily from metal communities—and their Japanese audience, consisting mostly of male idol fans. They concluded that Babymetal, among other idol groups, show girls as "an idealized figure, neither produced nor consumed by girls, but enacted by performers who are girls for the male gaze".

In an analysis of Babymetal's lyrics across their debut and second albums, Babymetal and Metal Resistance, musicologist Lewis F. Kennedy commented on the contrast between their often adolescent themes and the grim aesthetics of the metal genre. He also remarked on the frequent use of wordplay in their first album, reinforcing the childish nature of the lyrics. The more extensive usage of English vocabulary in Metal Resistance Kennedy saw as an effort from the band to internationalize the themes of their album to reach a wider audience. He characterized this development as making it more "traditionally metal", which metal fans would find more authentic. He also perceived the album's overarching themes of collective resistance to be a departure from both their earlier work and more traditional idol music.

=== Live performances and music videos ===
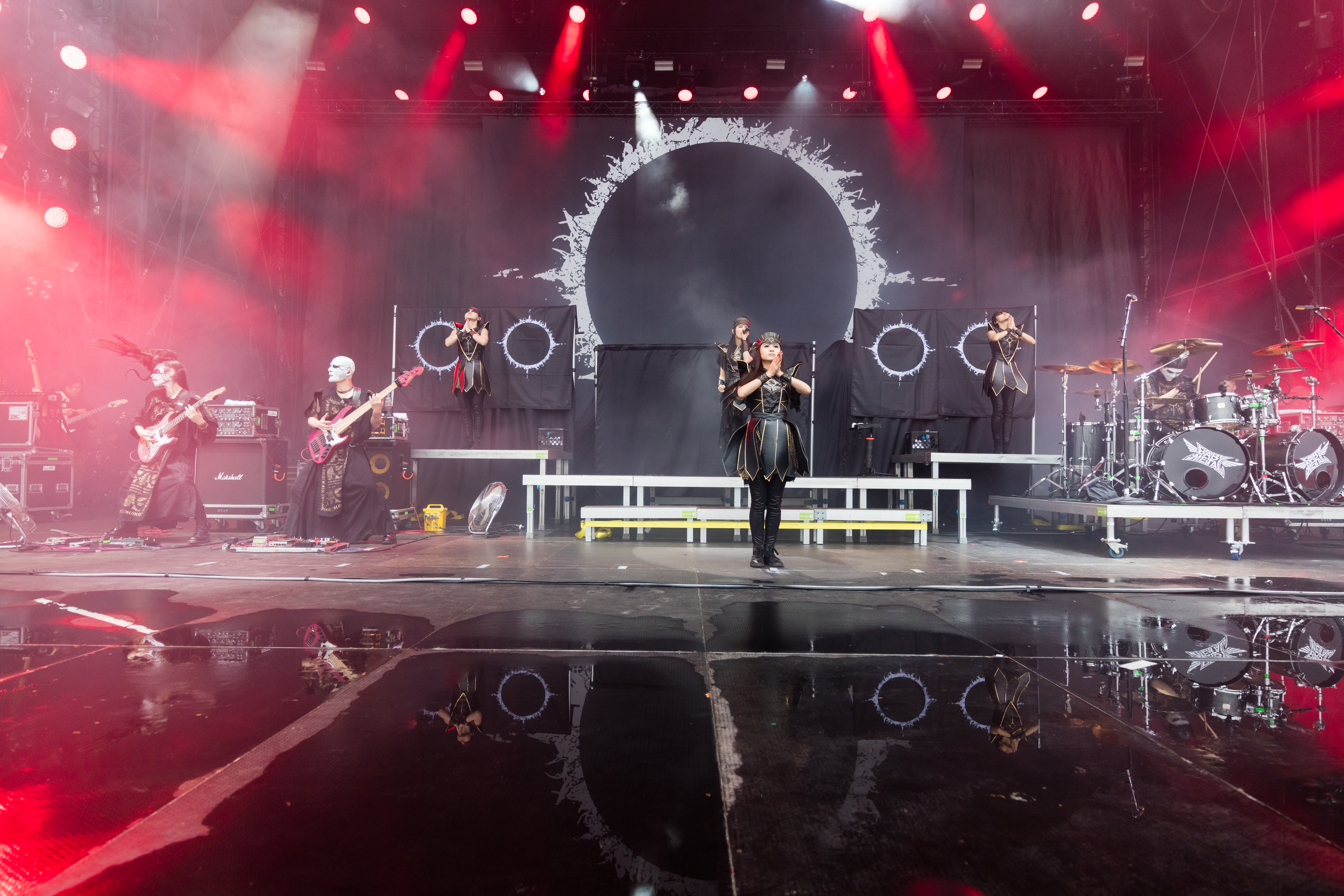
Babymetal and Kami Band performing at Rock am Ring in Nürburgring, Germany, June 2018

Su-metal is the main vocalist, credited on Babymetal's official site with vocals and dancing, while Moametal and Yuimetal are credited with scream and dance, performing on either side of her in a triangle formation. In the band's early years, the band members did not speak directly to the audience, or smile at the crowd, but over time the band has incorporated more audience engagement and call and responses into their performances. Between songs, Babymetal does not engage with the crowd. Instead, there is a blackout, or, in situations where that is not possible, they will freeze in a pose or turn away from the crowd. Babymetal's costumes take a variety of cues from the popular Japanese Gothic and Punk Lolita styles, with an emphasis on red and black.

During the 2018 World Tour, due to Yuimetal's absence, the band performed with Moametal and Su-metal in front of one another, using risers to separate, while two backup dancers perform at the sides of the stage. In June 2019, the traditional three-piece formation was temporarily restored through the inclusion of individual rotating backup dancers called the Avengers, which consisted of Kano Fujihira, Riho Sayashi, and Momoko Okazaki. Babymetal became a permanent trio again in April 2023, when Okazaki was made a permanent member.

Instead of the sign of the horns, the band uses the hand gesture of the kitsune to symbolise the band's supposed divine inspiration. Initially, the band members were shown photos of the sign of the horns, but mistook it for the head of a fox. Rather than correct the error, the management accepted the kitsune sign as the band's sign. Additionally, Babymetal style of moshing, known as mosh'sh (モッシュッシュ, mosshusshu), has been described a safe, fun, friendly game of push and shove.

In their concerts, Babymetal are accompanied by a backing band. In their early stages, the backing band consisted of the "Babybones"—a group of nameless individuals dressed in skeleton costumes that would mime live performances while pre-recorded studio tracks were being used. In late 2012, Babymetal debuted a live band for their live performances which they referred to as "Full Metal Band"—a group of live musicians dressed in white robes and corpse paint. They have since been referred to by band members and fans as "Gods of Metal" and more recently "Kami Band" (神バンド, lit. 'God Band'). From late 2012 to early 2014, the two groups would alternate, with the Kami Band being used more for festival appearances and special events. At the Babymetal Death Match Tour in May 2013, the Kami Band performed all music live for the first time. As of early 2014, the Babybones band has been quietly retired, and the Kami Band has since been established as Babymetal's primary backing band.

The Kami Band has consisted of a rotating line-up of different musicians since its debut in late 2012. As of early 2018, however, the line-up has been relatively stable, consisting of guitarists Takayoshi Ohmura, Leda, and Isao, bassist Boh, and drummer Hideki Aoyama with guitarists occasionally substituting for one another if needed. Kami Band member Leda has contributed to Babymetal's music, most notably on their album Metal Resistance (credited as Ledametal). Starting in 2019, the Kami Band has featured primarily Western musicians; guitarists Chris Kelly and CJ Masciantonio, bassist Clint Tustin, and drummer Anthony Barone. Ryan Neff and Matt Deis have also substituted on bass, starting in 2023 and 2024 respectively.

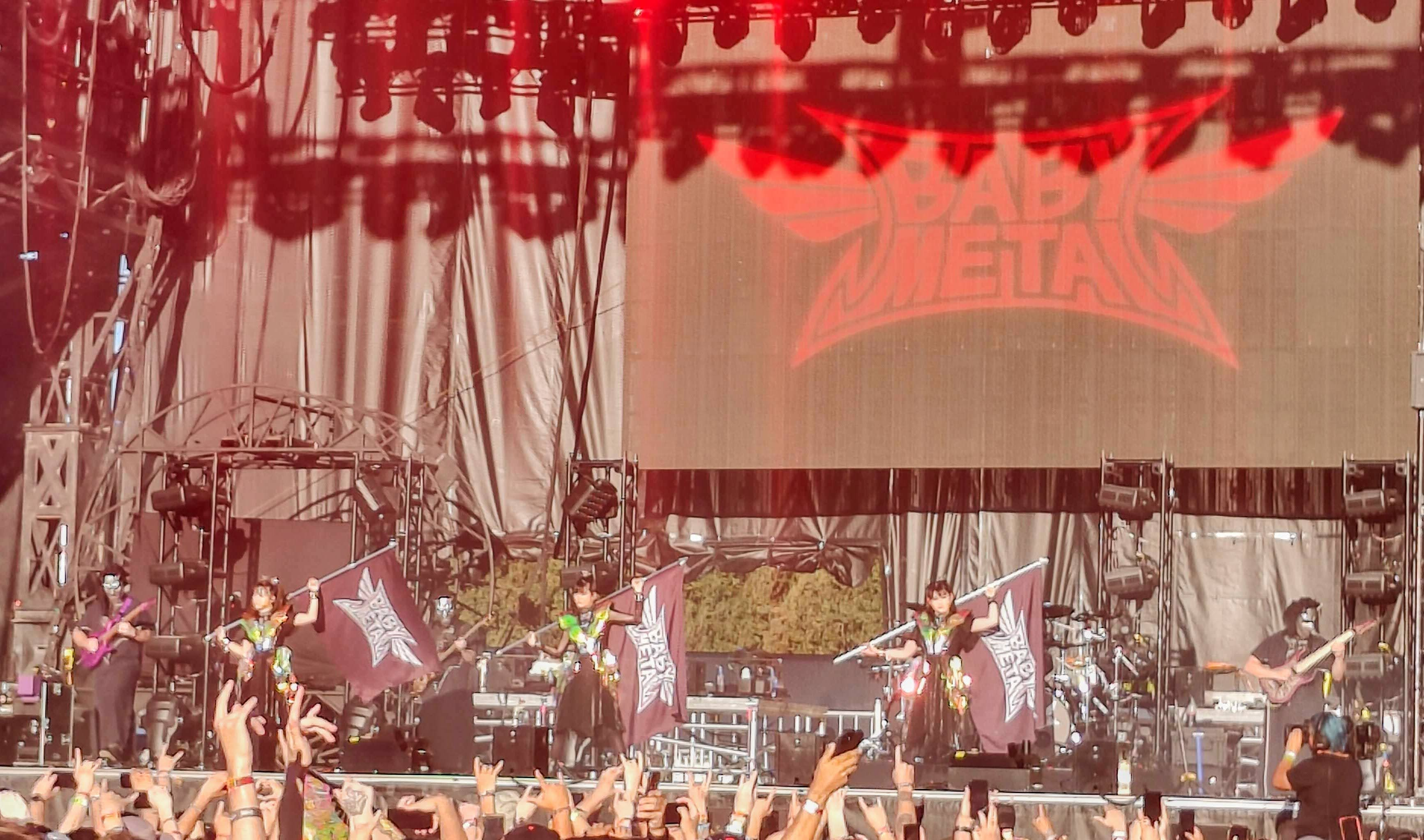
Babymetal at Aftershock 2023 in Sacramento, California

Babymetal's music videos, which showcase their distinct visual aesthetic, have helped the band gain broad attention. Their video for "Gimme Chocolate!!" went viral in 2014 with USA Today's Brian Mansfield commenting that the "video looks like some kind of bizarre animé, with a dark-goth set and band members playing in skeleton costumes, and the three girls execute intricate choreography, flash heart signs and make windmill arm motions like they're playing air guitar"

In regards to their music video for the song "Karate", Moametal said she is "very proud that they are now representing this culture that came from Japan through their music, and it's a way for more people outside of Japan to also learn what karate is all about." The lyrics talk about never giving up and moving forward. Yuimetal stated the choreography for the song represented the lyrics and that "it's important to be able to express the messages that they want to put across through the music with their dance moves." The majority of their lyrics are in Japanese and they see their choreography as a way to break the language barrier.

== Public image ==
According to Kei "Kobametal" Kobayashi, the band's executive producer, the band was formed under the idea of a new type of metal, and the members of the band receive "divine messages" from the Fox God, though Nakamoto explained that the messages received were indirect, as they would be sent to Kobametal first. He stated it was the people's decision to accept or reject the idea. Additionally, he rejected the notion of the band being a "metal" or "pop" act, preferring "the one and only Babymetal." Kikuchi joked that the three members did not decide to join the band, as it was a destiny chosen by the Fox God, whose goal was to have the band perform and spread their music all over the world.

The band has received varied reception by the public. Some critics praised the band for being "creative" and "rule-breaking" in the metal genre, while others called the band a "novelty group" and a "silly balancing act". When asked about people who do not consider the band's pop-infused music "metal", Nakamoto acknowledged the claims and praised such accusations, warranting how metal purists have their own preferences for metal being a certain way, and taking them into consideration for the band's progress.

The fanbase, collectively referred to as "The One", has been noted by Mizuno to be a mixed demographic of varying age. Noting the fans of metal and pop, she described the "metalheads" who look like themselves, and the pop fans who dress and cosplay as them. She further emphasized the importance of being able to reach out to younger music fans branching out to the metal genre via Babymetal, noting her own lack of experience of metal before joining the band.

On December 10, 2013, Babymetal released "Babymetal Apocalypse", an incomplete binder that would be gradually filled with pages intermittently made available later. Pages would include the lore of Babymetal, artwork and photos, and information on member-exclusive events, like "Apocrypha" during the Babymetal World Tour 2014. By purchasing the binder and entering a code included with the enclosed art book online, one could join the band's official fanclub called "Babymetal Apocalypse Web". A video uploaded to "Babymetal Apocalypse Web" members in December 2014 announced the transition to a new official fanclub called "The One", which started with limited edition releases for Live at Budokan: Red Night & Black Night Apocalypse, and would continue to release member-exclusive media with news published to the official fansite.

== Legacy ==
Babymetal is credited for creating the kawaii metal ("cute metal" in English) genre, which combines elements from J-pop and heavy metal. This genre has introduced metal to new audiences, and many new kawaii metal bands have formed since Babymetal's debut. While most kawaii metal bands are based in Japan, the genre has begun to spread outside the country to places like South Korea, where kawaii metal bands like Pritz have formed. Furthermore, the reach of Babymetal's influence has stretched far beyond Japan. In 2016, Babymetal became the highest-charting Japanese band ever in the UK's Official Charts history with the release of their album Metal Resistance. In the US, Metal Resistance was the first Japanese album to chart in the Billboard Top 40 in over 50 years, where it reached No. 39 in its first week. The last Japanese artist to break the Top 40 was Kyu Sakamoto in 1963. In 2019, Babymetal became the first Asian act to top the Billboard Rock Albums chart with the release of their third studio album Metal Galaxy.

== Reception ==
=== Japan ===
Yūzō Kayama, a famous musician, actor and songwriter in Japan, said of the song "Gimme Chocolate!!", "I think it's hard to sing, but the pitch of the song is accurate. The rhythm is new, there are some Japanese points, the dance is innovative, and it's crisp." Reiko Yukawa, a well-known music critic in Japan, stated, "Babymetal is pretty cute with singing and dancing, they have charisma like Himiko, and glittering that no one can replace."

Yoshiki, leader of rock group X Japan, stated, "I really liked the idea of the fusion of cute girls and metal", adding "someday (X Japan can play with Babymetal)". Burrn! editor-in-chief Hirose said they were "welcome as a completely new entertainment from Japan in the UK regardless of whether it is heavy metal or not." Burrn!'s Naomiyuki Umezawa felt that Babymetal "stares metal in the face" and "creates extremely precise sounds which attracts fans and requires admiration".

=== Abroad ===
The Daily Dot wrote, "for those of us whose musical tastes fall somewhere in the middle, Babymetal is kind of like a magical, leather-clad, fire-breathing, sonic unicorn." According to The Guardian, "This is Japanese pop music, created behind-the-scenes by some fiendish Machiavellian genius who almost certainly had a sudden 'Eureka!' moment in the middle of the night and realised that Japanese audiences were certain to unquestioningly embrace such a seemingly incongruous mish-mash of cutting-edge musical ideas."

The Los Angeles Times in a review said, "Babymetal is a Japanese concept group, and they're the most divisive thing in heavy music right now." MetalSucks said, "Babymetal isn't metal. It's theater, the Japanese pop industry deconstructing post-millennial metal and modern pop tropes and reconstituting them into a fully realized, 360-degree entertainment experience." Opeth's Mikael Åkerfeldt praised Babymetal, calling the band "a great influx for metal". After Judas Priest's Rob Halford performed with Babymetal in July 2016, he shared, "Babymetal is the future of metal." Rob Zombie, in response to divisive comments from his fans after posting a photo of him posing with Babymetal, said, "These three girls had more energy than 90 percent of the bands we play with".

== Members ==
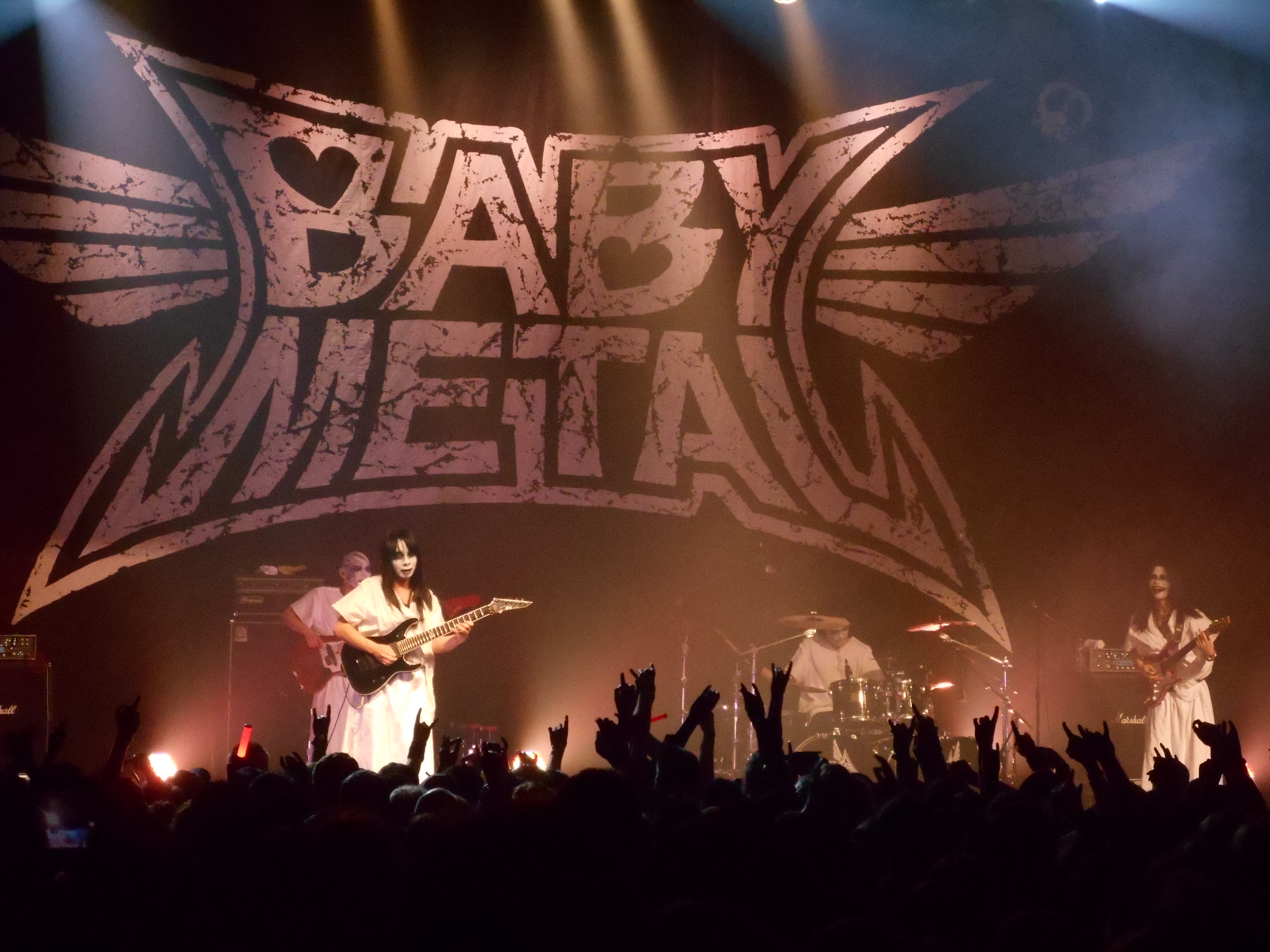
Babymetal's backing band "Kami Band" performing at Danforth Music Hall in Toronto, May 2015; from left to right: Boh, Mikio Fujioka, Hideki Aoyama and Takayoshi Ohmura

Only the names of the core members of Babymetal are officially published.

Babymetal members

- Su-metal (Suzuka Nakamoto) – vocal and dance (2010–present)
- Moametal (Moa Kikuchi) – scream and dance (2010–present)
- Momometal (Momoko Okazaki) – scream and dance (2023–present; previously an Avenger (backup dancer) from 2019 to 2023)
- Yuimetal (Yui Mizuno) – scream and dance (2010–2018)

Kami Band members

- Anthony Barone – drums (2019–present)
- Eugene Ryabchenko – drums (2026–present)
- Chris Kelly – guitars (2019–present)
- CJ Masciantonio – guitars (2019–present)
- Matt Deis – bass (2024–present)
- Mikio Fujioka – guitars (2013–2018; died 2018)
- Leda Cygnus – guitars (2013–2020)
- Boh – bass (2013–2023)
- Takayoshi Ohmura – guitars (2013–2023)
- Hideki Aoyama – drums (2013–2023)
- Isao Fujita – guitars (2015–2023)
- Clint Tustin – bass (2019–2024)
- Ryan Neff – bass (2023–2024)

Backup dancers

- Riho Sayashi – Avenger (2019–2020)
- Kano Fujihira – Avenger (2019–2020)
- Minako Maruyama – backup dancer (2018)
- Minami Tsukui – backup dancer (2018)
- Shōko Akiyama – backup dancer (2018)
- Saya Hirai – backup dancer (2018)
- Kotono Ōmori – backup dancer (2018)

Timeline

== Discography ==
- Babymetal (2014)
- Metal Resistance (2016)
- Metal Galaxy (2019)
- The Other One (2023)
- Metal Forth (2025)

== Filmography ==
Year	Title	Role	Notes	Ref.
2024	Heavier Trip	Themselves	Cameo	

== Tours ==
- Babymetal World Tour 2014
  - Babymetal Back to the USA / UK Tour 2014
- Babymetal World Tour 2015
  - Babymetal World Tour 2015 in Japan
- Babymetal World Tour 2016: Legend Metal Resistance
- Babymetal US Tour 2017 (with Korn and Stone Sour)
- The Five Fox Festival in Japan (2017)
  - Big Fox Festival in Japan (2017)
- Babymetal World Tour 2018
- Metal Galaxy World Tour (2019–2020)
- Babymetal World Tour 2023–2024
- Babymetal World Tour 2025–2026

== Awards and nominations ==
Year	Nominee / work	Award	Result
2014	Babymetal	2014 MTV Europe Music Awards – Wild Card for Best Japanese Act	Pre-nominated
2014	Babymetal	NEO Awards 2014 – Best Musical Act	Won
2015	Babymetal	7th CD Shop Awards – Grand Prix	Won
2015	Babymetal	Loudwire 4th Annual Music Awards – Best New Artist of the Year Award	Won
2015	Babymetal	Kerrang! Awards 2015 – Spirit of Independence Award	Won
2015	Babymetal	Metal Hammer Golden Gods Awards 2015 – Breakthrough Award	Won
2015	Babymetal	2015 MTV Europe Music Awards – Best Japanese Act	Nominated
2015	Babymetal	2015 MTV Video Music Awards Japan – Best Metal Artist	Won
2015	Babymetal	GQ Men of the Year 2015 Award, Special Prize "Discovery of the Year"	Won
2015	Babymetal	Vogue Japan Women of the Year 2015	Won
2015	Babymetal	Neo Awards 2015 – Best Musical Act	Won
2015	Babymetal	Loudwire 5th Annual Music Awards – Most Devoted Fans of 2015	Won
2015	Babymetal	Loudwire 5th Annual Music Awards – Best Live Act of 2015	Won
2015	"Road of Resistance"	Loudwire 5th Annual Music Awards – Best Metal Song of 2015	Won
2016	Metal Resistance	Loudwire – Most Anticipated Release of April 2016	Won
2016	Metal Resistance	2016 MTV Video Music Awards Japan – Best Album of the Year (Japan)	Won
2016	"Karate"	2016 MTV Video Music Awards Japan – Best Metal Video (Japan)	Won
2016	"Karate"	2016 MTV Video Music Awards Japan – Best Group Video (Japan)	Nominated
2016	Babymetal	Kerrang! Awards 2016 – Best Live Band	Won
2016	Babymetal	Metal Hammer Golden Gods Awards 2016 – Best International Band	Nominated
2016	Babymetal	2016 Alternative Press Music Awards – Best International Band	Nominated
2016	Babymetal	2016 AIM Independent Music Awards – Best Live Act	Won
2016	Babymetal	Revolver Music Awards 2016 – Best New Talent	Nominated
2017	Metal Resistance	Loudwire 6th Annual Music Awards – Best Metal Album of 2016	Won
2017	Metal Resistance	Loudwire 6th Annual Music Awards – Best Metal Song of 2016 - "Karate" (music video)	Won
2017	Babymetal	Loudwire 6th Annual Music Awards – Rock Goddess of the Year 2016 — "Su-metal"	Won
2017	Babymetal	Loudwire 6th Annual Music Awards – Best Live Act 2016 — "Babymetal"	Won
2017	Babymetal	Loudwire 6th Annual Music Awards – Most Devoted Fans 2016	Won
2017	Babymetal	Loudwire 7th Annual Music Awards – Most Dedicated Fans 2017	Won
2017	Babymetal	2017 MTV Europe Music Awards – Best Japan Act	Won
2020	Metal Galaxy	2020 MTV Video Music Awards Japan – Best Album of the Year	Won
2027	"Sunset Kiss" (with Polyphia)	69th Annual Grammy Awards – Best Asian Pop Music Performance	Pending
