= Live in London: Babymetal World Tour 2014 =

2015 live video album by Babymetal

Live album and video by Babymetal
- Released: May 20, 2015 (video); August 25, 2021 (live album)
- Recorded: July 7, 2014; November 8, 2014
- Venues: The Forum; O2 Academy Brixton
- Genres: Kawaii metal; J-pop; heavy metal
- Length: 76:24 (The Forum); 87:43 (O2 Academy Brixton)
- Languages: Japanese; English
- Labels: BMD Fox; Toy's Factory; Amuse
- Director: Inni Vision
- Producer: Kobametal

Babymetal album chronology
Live: Legend 1999 & 1997 Apocalypse (2021)	Live in London: Babymetal World Tour 2014 (2021)	Live at Tokyo Dome (2021)

Babymetal video chronology
Live at Budokan: Red Night & Black Night Apocalypse (2014)	Live in London: Babymetal World Tour 2014 (2015)	Trilogy: Metal Resistance Episode III – Apocalypse (2016)

Live in London: Babymetal World Tour 2014 (titled Live in London internationally) is the fourth live video album by Japanese band Babymetal, released in Japan on May 20, 2015 through BMD Fox Records and Toy's Factory, and in Europe on October 30, 2015 through earMusic. It contains two concerts that the band gave in London as part of its first world tour, Babymetal World Tour 2014, taking place on July 7, 2014 at The Forum, and on November 8, 2014 at the O2 Academy Brixton.

== Background ==
On May 7, 2014 Babymetal announced their first world tour, called the Babymetal World Tour 2014, with a tour date set in London, United Kingdom on July 7, 2014 at the Electric Ballroom. However, this would later be moved to a bigger venue located at The Forum as a result of tickets quickly selling out. On August 16, 2014, after the end of the festival Summer Sonic Festival 2014 in Chiba, Japan, the band announced an extra leg of the tour, the Babymetal Back to the USA / UK Tour 2014, with one of two added shows taking place in London on November 8, 2014 at O2 Academy Brixton.

On February 27, 2015, the band announced a video release of the two shows on their official website, in 2-DVD and Blu-ray formats, while on April 9, 2015, the release was announced for inclusion in "The One" member-exclusive box set Babymetal World Tour 2014 Apocalypse. A trailer for Live in London: Babymetal World Tour 2014 was posted online on April 23, 2015. The show at O2 Academy Brixton was pre-screened at five movie theaters in Japan on May 15, 2015, while a digest of the shows was regularly broadcast by Yunika Vision onto Tokyo Station and Seibu-Shinjuku Station from May 11 to May 20, 2015. On October 14, 2015, the band announced the video's release in Europe set for October 30, 2015.

The album was also released in vinyl format on August 25, 2021 to commemorate the band's tenth anniversary.

== Content ==
The first concert was performed at The Forum on July 7, 2014. The show began with a video introduction with a Star Wars-inspired opening crawl declaring "all metal roads lead to Europe", and then commencing with the opening track "Babymetal Death", with the members of the band performing the rest of the songs from Babymetal with the accompanying Kami Band playing the music live. After performing "Gimme Chocolate!!", the three members leave the stage until the encore. When performing the final song "Ijime, Dame, Zettai", the introductory narration is in English, contrary to previous shows.

The second concert was performed at Brixton Academy on November 8, 2014. The show played through a similar set list, with the performance featuring lore surrounding the Fox Gods and other legends. At the closing of the performance, the band marked the conclusion of Metal Resistance Episode II by performing the new song, "Road of Resistance".

== Reception ==
Josh Saco from The Quietus positively reviewed the performance at The Forum, calling the performance authentic and more than just "mere exploitation" of the genre, praising the staff of Babymetal for knowing the genre, "from devastating drums, to screeching guitars". Colin McQuistan of HuffPost positively reviewed the performance at Brixton Academy, stating that compared to the "astonishing" performance at The Forum, the band had "a meaner, more purposeful edge", and noting that the larger capacity of the venue suited the band members as they performed.

Live in London: Babymetal World Tour 2014 peaked at number three on the Oricon weekly DVD chart and simultaneously topped the Blu-ray chart for the week of June 1, 2015, with first-week sales of 5,510 and approximately 13,000 copies, respectively. In addition to topping the sub-charts for Blu-ray music videos, Babymetal became the first teenage act ever to have two consecutive number-one Blu-ray videos. After its release in the United Kingdom, the video also managed to peak at number nine on the Official Charts Company Music Videos chart for the week of November 1, 2015.

== Track listing ==
The Forum
No.	Title	Writer(s)	Length
1.	"Babymetal Death"	Kitsune of Metal God	7:49
2.	"Iine!" (いいね!)	Nakata Caos; Mish-Mosh	4:12
3.	"Uki Uki ★ Midnight" (ウ・キ・ウ・キ★ミッドナイト)	Ryu-metal; Fuji-metal; Nakata Caos; Team-K	3:28
4.	"Mischiefs of Metal Gods" (Kami Band instrumental)		3:48
5.	"Rondo of Nightmare" (悪夢の輪舞曲)	Yuyoyuppe	4:25
6.	"Onedari Daisakusen" (おねだり大作戦)	Nakata Caos; Ryu-metal; Fuji-metal; Team-K	3:26
7.	"Catch Me If You Can"	Edometal; Narasaki	5:59
8.	"Akatsuki" (紅月 -アカツキ-)	Nakametal; Tsubometal	6:57
9.	"Song 4" (4の歌)	Black Babymetal	4:16
10.	"Megitsune" (メギツネ)	Mk-metal; Norimetal	5:16
11.	"Doki Doki ☆ Morning" (ド・キ・ド・キ☆モーニング)	Nakametal; Norizō; Motonari Murakawa	3:46
12.	"Gimme Chocolate!!" (ギミチョコ！！)	Mk-metal; Kxbxmetal; Takeshi Ueda	6:49
13.	"Headbangeeeeerrrrr!!!!!" (ヘドバンギャー！！) (encore)	Edometal; Nakametal; Narasaki	5:47
14.	"Ijime, Dame, Zettai" (イジメ、ダメ、ゼッタイ) (encore)	Nakametal; Tsubometal; Kxbxmetal; Takemetal	10:26
Total length:			76:24

O2 Academy Brixton
No.	Title	Writer(s)	Length
1.	"Babymetal Death"	Kitsune of Metal God	6:48
2.	"Iine!" (いいね!)	Nakata Caos; Mish-Mosh	4:14
3.	"Uki Uki ★ Midnight" (ウ・キ・ウ・キ★ミッドナイト)	Ryu-metal; Fuji-metal; Nakata Caos; Team-K	3:26
4.	"Mischiefs of Metal Gods" (Kami Band instrumental)		3:34
5.	"Rondo of Nightmare" (悪夢の輪舞曲)	Yuyoyuppe	4:30
6.	"Song 4" (4の歌)	Black Babymetal	4:28
7.	"Catch Me If You Can"	Edometal; Narasaki	5:54
8.	"Akatsuki" (紅月 -アカツキ-)	Nakametal; Tsubometal	6:53
9.	"Onedari Daisakusen" (おねだり大作戦)	Nakata Caos; Ryu-metal; Fuji-metal; Team-K	3:28
10.	"Megitsune" (メギツネ)	Mk-metal; Norimetal	5:18
11.	"Doki Doki ☆ Morning" (ド・キ・ド・キ☆モーニング)	Nakametal; Norizō; Motonari Murakawa	3:47
12.	"Gimme Chocolate!!" (ギミチョコ！！)	Mk-metal; Kxbxmetal; Takeshi Ueda	5:02
13.	"Ijime, Dame, Zettai" (イジメ、ダメ、ゼッタイ)	Nakametal; Tsubometal; Kxbxmetal; Takemetal	8:48
14.	"Headbangeeeeerrrrr!!!!!" (ヘドバンギャー！！) (encore)	Edometal; Nakametal; Narasaki	8:28
15.	"Road of Resistance" (encore)	Kitsune of Metal God; Mk-metal; Kxbxmetal; Mish-Mosh; Norimetal; Kyt-metal	13:05
Total length:			87:43

Notes

- "Mischiefs of Metal Gods" is not listed in the track listings of any format.

== Personnel ==
Credits adapted from Live in London: Babymetal World Tour 2014 booklet.

- Su-metal (Suzuka Nakamoto) – lead and background vocals, dance
- Yuimetal (Yui Mizuno) – lead and background vocals (credited as "scream"), dance
- Moametal (Moa Kikuchi) – lead and background vocals (credited as "scream"), dance

== Charts ==
=== Weekly charts ===
Chart (2015–2021)	Peak position
Japanese Albums (Oricon)	256
Japanese DVD (Oricon)	3
Japanese Music DVD (Oricon)	2
Japanese Blu-ray (Oricon)	1
Japanese Music Blu-ray (Oricon)	1
UK Music Videos (Official Charts)	9

=== Daily charts ===
Chart (2015)	Peak position
Japanese DVD (Oricon)	2
Japanese Blu-ray (Oricon)	1

== Release history ==
Region	Date	Format	Label	Catalog	Ref.
Japan	May 20, 2015	Blu-ray; DVD	BMD Fox Records; Toy's Factory; Amuse, Inc.	TFBQ-18167; TFXQ-78120	
United Kingdom	October 30, 2015	Blu-ray; DVD	earMusic	EMU0210721; EMU0210722	
Japan	August 25, 2021	LP	BMD Fox Records; Toy's Factory; Amuse, Inc.	TFJC-38073/7	
