= Babymetal World Tour 2015 =

2015 concert tour by Babymetal

- World tour by Babymetal
- Promotional poster for the tour
- Location: North America; Europe; Asia
- Associated album: Babymetal
- Start date: 23 April 2015
- End date: 13 December 2015
- Legs: 7
- No. of shows: 4 in North America; 10 in Europe; 21 in Asia; 35 in total

Babymetal concert chronology
- Babymetal World Tour 2014 (2014); Babymetal World Tour 2015 (2015); Babymetal World Tour 2016: Legend Metal Resistance (2016)

The Babymetal World Tour 2015 was the second worldwide concert tour by Japanese band Babymetal. Supporting the international re-release of their eponymous debut album, the tour ran from 23 April 2015 to 13 December 2015, taking place in Japan, the United States, Canada, Mexico, and several countries in Europe. The European leg of the tour commenced on 29 May 2015, less than a month before the worldwide release of Babymetal.

== Background ==
Babymetal performed their first show of 2015 at Saitama Super Arena on 10 January 2015. At the show's closure, the band announced the tour with a key performance set for Makuhari Messe, the next part of the lore of Episode III of the Metal Resistance.

Prior to the announcement of the world tour, Babymetal released the song "Road of Resistance" as a single. According to Nakamoto, the song is about "paving a new path", which was the goal for the tour. She also explained that two weeks of rehearsals preceded the tour, which she felt was insufficient.

The first tour dates were announced on 10 February 2015, with dates for Mexico, Canada, United States, Germany, Austria and Japan. Additional dates were later announced in France, Switzerland, Italy. After the concert at Makuhari Messe on 21 June 2015, which became the band's highest attended show to date with 25,000 people, the band extended the tour with a new leg entitled Babymetal World Tour 2015 in Japan (stylized as BABYMETAL WORLD TOUR 2015 in JAPAN) and ten new tour dates.

During the tour, the band made appearances at the Reading and Leeds Festivals, Metrock, Download Festival (with prominent power metal band DragonForce), the 2015 Metal Hammer Golden Gods Awards, Tokyo's Ultra Music Festival with Skrillex, and Ozzfest.

== Concert synopsis ==
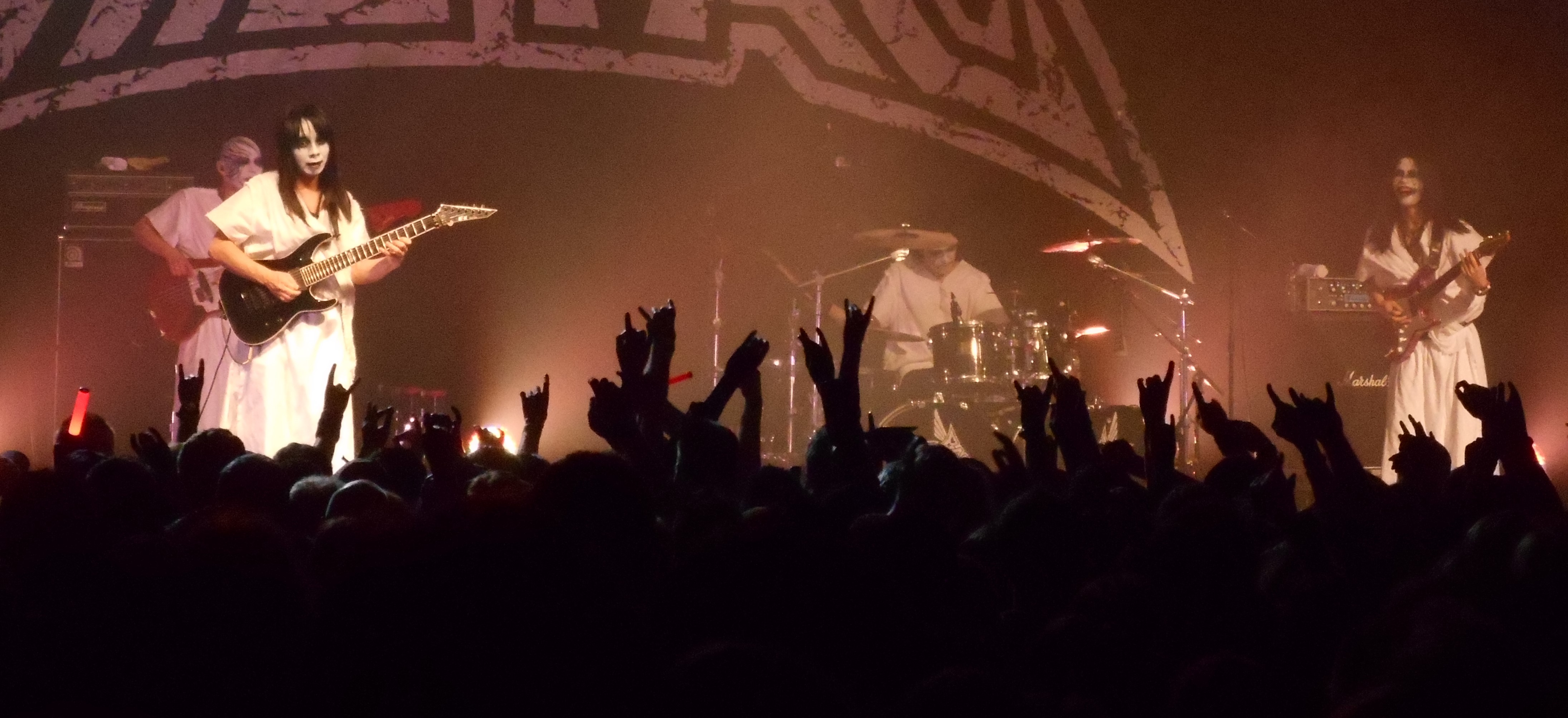
During the concert, the Kami Band, which plays all music live for Babymetal on the tour, has opportunities for jam sessions without the three members onstage, in between some songs.

The concert begins with an opening movie addressing the audience and announcing regulations for the show, followed by the playing of the accompanying Kami Band. The three members project silhouettes onto a curtain in front of the stage, which then falls as the band first performs "Iine!" The Kami Band back up the three with their performance as they dance magnificently to "Megitsune", and contrast their cute and pop songs with the heavy sound from their regular number "Doki Doki ☆ Morning", becoming heated on the floor. "Awadama Fever" has Su-metal performing call and response with the audience shouting "Oh! Yeah!"

Following the performance of "Uki Uki ★ Midnight", the three members leave the stage, as the Kami Band proceeds into a jam session that transitions into Su-metal's solo "Akatsuki". The audience evidently moshes in response to the vocal performance, which includes some croud-surfing. Next, Yuimetal and Moametal perform as Black Babymetal for their song "Song 4", which emphasizes their charming appearances to the crowd.

The three members collect again to perform "Headbangeeeeerrrrr!!!!!" which brings the concert towards its climax. They perform a new song, "Yava!", which premiered during the tour, followed by "Ijime, Dame, Zettai" to keep the excitement up. The band starts "Gimme Chocolate!!" with Yuimetal and Moametal shouting "I can't hear you!" and "Louder, louder!" to the crowd in the interlude, followed by the audience parroting the chorus after Su-metal, who then shouts "Thank you!"

Performing the final song, "Road of Resistance", the three members of Babymetal reappear on the stage, holding flags depicting the band's logo. As the song finishes, the three members repeatedly shout "We are Babymetal!", and walk off the stage after yelling "See you!", the venue filled with heat.

== Broadcast and recording ==
The concert held at Makuhari Messe on 21 June was broadcast live across 24 theaters in Japan with 5000 viewers in total. Wowow broadcast the Summer Sonic concerts held on 15 and 16 August, and will also broadcast the first concert held in Yokohama Arena in April 2016. The non-canon Apocrypha shows on 23 April and 24 April 2015 were released as part of "The One" limited edition of Metal Resistance, and the shows at Makuhari Messe and Yokohama Arena, as well as the show at Saitama Super Arena, were later released as a limited edition box set titled Trilogy: Metal Resistance Episode III – Apocalypse.

== Set list ==
North American and European legs

This setlist is representative of the show in Mexico City, Mexico on 9 May 2015. It does not represent all dates throughout the tour.

1. "Babymetal Death"
2. "Iine!" (いいね！)
3. "Mischiefs of Metal Gods"
4. "Rondo of Nightmare" (悪夢の輪舞曲)
5. "Onedari Daisakusen" (おねだり大作戦)
6. "Catch Me If You Can"
7. "Akatsuki" (紅月 -アカツキ-)
8. "Song 4" (4の歌)
9. "Megitsune" (メギツネ)
10. "Doki Doki ☆ Morning" (ド・キ・ド・キ☆モーニング)
11. "Gimme Chocolate!!" (ギミチョコ！！)
12. "Ijime, Dame, Zettai" (イジメ、ダメ、ゼッタイ)
13. "Headbangeeeeerrrrr!!!!!" (ヘドバンギャー！！) (encore)
14. "Road of Resistance" (encore)
Babymetal World Tour 2015 in Japan

This setlist is representative of the show in Tokyo, Japan on 16 October 2015. It does not represent all dates throughout the tour.

1. "Iine!" (いいね！)
2. "Megitsune" (メギツネ)
3. "Doki Doki ☆ Morning" (ド・キ・ド・キ☆モーニング)
4. "Awadama Fever" (あわだまフィーバー)
5. "Catch Me If You Can"
6. "Uki Uki ★ Midnight" (ウ・キ・ウ・キ★ミッドナイト)
7. "Akatsuki" (紅月 -アカツキ-)
8. "Song 4" (4の歌)
9. "Headbangeeeeerrrrr!!!!!" (ヘドバンギャー！！)
10. "Yava!" (ヤバッ！)
11. "Ijime, Dame, Zettai" (イジメ、ダメ、ゼッタイ)
12. "Gimme Chocolate!!" (ギミチョコ！！)
13. "Road of Resistance"

== Tour dates ==
Date	City	Country	Venue
Asia (pre-tour)
10 January 2015	Saitama	Japan	Saitama Super Arena
Asia
23 April 2015 (Note: The concerts of 23 April and 24 April 2015 are part of the band's "The One" member-exclusive events "Apocrypha: The Black Mass" and "Apocrypha: The Red Mass", respectively. The events were open only to males and females, respectively. As with the nature of Apocrypha, these shows are not listed as tour dates.)	Tokyo	Japan	Tsutaya O-East
24 April 2015	Tokyo	Japan	Tsutaya O-East
North America
9 May 2015	Mexico City	Mexico	Circo Volador
12 May 2015	Toronto	Canada	Danforth Music Hall
14 May 2015	Chicago	United States	House of Blues
16 May 2015 (Note: The concert of 16 May 2015 in Chicago, United States at the House of Blues is a part of Rock on the Range.)	Columbus	United States	Mapfre Stadium
Asia
24 May 2015 (Note: The concert of 24 May 2015 in Tokyo, Japan at Shinkiba Wakasu Park is a part of Metrock.)	Tokyo	Japan	Shinkiba Wakasu Park
Europe
29 May 2015 (Note: The concert of 29 May 2015 in Munich, Germany at Olympiahalle is a part of Rockavaria.)	Munich	Germany	Olympiahalle
30 May 2015 (Note: The concert of 30 May 2015 in Gelsenkirchen, Germany at Veltins-Arena is a part of Rock Im Revier.)	Gelsenkirchen	Germany	Veltins-Arena
1 June 2015	Strasbourg	France	La Laiterie
3 June 2015	Zürich	Switzerland	X-TRA
5 June 2015	Bologna	Italy	Estragon Club
6 June 2015 (Note: The concert of 6 June 2015 in Vienna, Austria at Donauinsel Wien is a part of Rock in Vienna.)	Vienna	Austria	Donauinsel Wien
Asia
21 June 2015 (Note: The concert of 21 June 2015 in Chiba, Japan at Makuhari Messe is billed as "Babymetal World Tour 2015: Kyodai Tenkaichi Metal Budokai".)	Chiba	Japan	Makuhari Messe
28 July 2015 (Note: This concert is a part of the band's "The One" member-exclusive events "Apocrypha: Only the Fox God Knows". As with the nature of Apocrypha, these shows are not listed as tour dates.)	Tokyo	Japan	Tsutaya O-East
29 July 2015	Tokyo	Japan	Tsutaya O-East
15 August 2015 (Note: The concerts of 15 August and 16 August 2015 in Chiba, Japan at Makuhari Messe are part of Summer Sonic Festival.)	Chiba	Japan	Makuhari Messe
16 August 2015	Osaka	Japan	Maishima Sports Island
20 August 2015 (Note: The concerts of 20 August and 21 August 2015 are part of the band's "The One" member-exclusive events "Apocrypha: The Black Mass II" and "Apocrypha: The Red Mass II", respectively. As with the nature of Apocrypha, these shows are not listed as tour dates.)	Tokyo	Japan	Tsutaya O-East
21 August 2015	Tokyo	Japan	Studio Coast
Europe
26 August 2015	Frankfurt	Germany	Batschkapp
27 August 2015	Berlin	Germany	Huxleys
29 August 2015 (Note: The concerts of 29 August 2015 in Reading, United Kingdom at Little John's Farm and 30 August 2015 in Leeds, United Kingdom at Braham Park are part of Reading and Leeds Festivals.)	Reading	England	Little John's Farm
30 August 2015	Leeds	England	Bramham Park
Asia
16 September 2015	Osaka	Japan	Zepp Namba (Osaka)
17 September 2015	Osaka	Japan	Zepp Namba (Osaka)
21 September 2015	Sapporo	Japan	Zepp Sapporo
2 October 2015	Fukuoka	Japan	Zepp Fukuoka
7 October 2015	Nagoya	Japan	Zepp Nagoya
8 October 2015	Nagoya	Japan	Zepp Nagoya
15 October 2015	Tokyo	Japan	Zepp DiverCity Tokyo
16 October 2015	Tokyo	Japan	Zepp DiverCity Tokyo
22 November 2015 (Note: The concert of 22 November 2015 in Chiba, Japan at Makuhari Messe is a part of Ozzfest.)	Chiba	Japan	Makuhari Messe
12 December 2015 (Note: The concert of 12 December 2015 in Yokohama, Japan at Yokohama Arena is billed as "Babymetal World Tour 2015 in Japan: The Final Chapter Of Trilogy – Act I".)	Yokohama	Japan	Yokohama Arena
13 December 2015 (Note: The concert of 13 December 2015 in Yokohama, Japan at Yokohama Arena is billed as "Babymetal World Tour 2015 in Japan: The Final Chapter Of Trilogy – Act II".)	Yokohama	Japan	Yokohama Arena

== Video releases ==
Legend 2015: New Year Fox Festival

Live album and video by Babymetal
- Released: 14 August 2015 (video); 21 October 2015 (live album)
- Recorded: 10 January 2015
- Venue: Saitama Super Arena
- Genres: Kawaii metal; J-pop; heavy metal
- Length: 95:31 (video); 89:54 (live album)
- Labels: BMD Fox; Amuse
- Producer: Kobametal

Trilogy: Metal Resistance Episode III – Apocalypse

Box set by Babymetal
- Released: 19 September 2016
- Recorded: 10 January 2015; 21 June 2015; 13 December 2015
- Venues: Saitama Super Arena; Makuhari Messe; Yokohama Arena
- Genres: Kawaii metal; J-pop; heavy metal
- Length: 95:31 (Disc 1); 88:59 (Disc 2); 96:36 (Disc 3)
- Labels: BMD Fox; Amuse
- Producer: Kobametal

Babymetal chronology
Live in London: Babymetal World Tour 2014 (2015)	Trilogy: Metal Resistance Episode III – Apocalypse (2016)	Live at Wembley (2016)

Footage from select shows were released in limited quantities to members of the band's official fanclub "The One". Legend 2015: New Year Fox Festival (LEGEND 2015 ～新春キツネ祭り～, Legend 2015: Shinshun Kitsune Matsuri) is a member-exclusive album release by Babymetal. It was first released on 14 August 2015 as a limited-quantity live video to "The One" fanclub members. The performance was also included as part of the box set Trilogy: Metal Resistance Episode III – Apocalypse (stylized as TRILOGY - METAL RESISTANCE EPISODE III - APOCALYPSE) in limited edition Blu-ray box set released exclusively to "The One" fanclub members on 1 September 2016, and as a stand-alone Blu-ray release for a limited time general sale on 19 September 2016.

=== Background ===
At the end of Legend "2015": New Year Fox Festival on 10 January 2015, the band announced a show set at Makuhari Messe on 21 June 2015. Tickets were announced for sale on 20 February 2015 on the band's official website, and the show was later confirmed for broadcast as a result of tickets selling out. 25,000 people attended the show, and at its conclusion, the band announced an extension of the tour set in Japan, with two shows at Yokohama Arena confirmed for 12 and 13 December 2015. Tickets were first made available to "The One" fanclub members on 9 September 2015.

On 1 June 2016, the band announced a box set release with three Blu-ray discs each containing footage from the show Legend 2015, and tour dates at Makuhari Messe on 21 June and Yokohama Arena on 13 December, as well as a photobook containing shots from the Babymetal World Tour 2015. The set was made available on 1 January 2016 exclusively to "The One" fanclub members. On 13 September 2016, a standalone Blu-ray release featuring all three shows was announced for a limited time sale during the band's performances at Tokyo Dome on 19 and 20 September 2016. The album is set to be released in a vinyl edition exclusively for "The One" fanclub members on 10 October 2021.

=== Content ===
Approximately 20,000 people attended the show "Legend 2015". An introductory video narrates the progress of the band's Metal Resistance, calling the followers part of the community called "The One". Beginning with the song "Megitsune", the band plays through all the songs from Babymetal, while performing the new songs "Awadama Fever" and, in the encore, "Road of Resistance", during which Nakamoto instructs the crowd to sing "Wow wow" at the bridge. The three band members walk down the runways in the arena, continually shouting "We are!" with the crowd responding "Babymetal!", ending after the members return to the stage. Afterwards, another video introduces the crowd to the Babymetal World Tour 2015.

For the performance at Makuhari Messe, the band played through several songs from their debut album Babymetal, and new songs like "Awadama Fever", "Road of Resistance", and the newly premiered "Yava!", which contained elements of electro.

The band would play most of the same songs at the final show of the tour at Yokohama Arena, in addition to premiering the new songs "Karate" and "The One". For the latter song, the three band members performed on a pyramid-shaped platform, which would be seen flying over the audience of 26,000 people.

=== Track listing ===
The standalone release of Legend 2015: New Year Fox Festival consists only of tracks from disc one.

Disc 1 — Legend "2015": New Year Fox Festival, 10/1/2015 at Saitama Super Arena
No.	Title	Writer(s)	Length
1.	"Megitsune" (メギツネ)	Mk-metal; Norimetal	9:54
2.	"Iine!" (いいね！)	Nakata Caos; Mish-Mosh	4:46
3.	"Awadama Fever" (あわだまフィーバー)	Mk-metal; Kxbxmetal; Takeshi Ueda	4:15
4.	"Akatsuki" (紅月 -アカツキ-)	Nakametal; Tsubometal	6:55
5.	"Onedari Daisakusen" (おねだり大作戦)	Nakata Caos; Ryu-metal; Fuji-metal; Team-K	3:25
6.	"Catch Me If You Can"	Edometal; Narasaki	6:10
7.	"Uki Uki ★ Midnight" (ウ・キ・ウ・キ★ミッドナイト)	Ryu-metal; Fuji-metal; Nakata Caos; Team-K	3:20
8.	"Song 4" (4の歌)	Black Babymetal	6:18
9.	"Rondo of Nightmare" (悪夢の輪舞曲)	Yuyoyuppe	7:17
10.	"Headbangeeeeerrrrr!!!!!" (ヘドバンギャー！！)	Edometal; Nakametal; Narasaki	6:21
11.	"Gimme Chocolate!!" (ギミチョコ！！)	Mk-metal; Kxbxmetal; Ueda	4:54
12.	"Ijime, Dame, Zettai" (イジメ、ダメ、ゼッタイ)	Nakametal; Tsubometal; Kxbxmetal; Takemetal	10:05
13.	"Babymetal Death"	Kitsune of Metal God	4:51
14.	"Doki Doki ☆ Morning" (ド・キ・ド・キ☆モーニング)	Nakametal; Norizō; Motonari Murakawa	5:15
15.	"Road of Resistance"	Kitsune of Metal God; Mk-metal; Kxbxmetal; Mish-Mosh; Norimetal; Kyt-metal	10:45
Total length:			95:31

Disc 2 — Babymetal World Tour 2015: Kyodai Tenkaichi Metal Budokai, 21/6/2015 at Makuhari Messe
No.	Title	Writer(s)	Length
1.	"Babymetal Death"	Kitsune of Metal God	6:37
2.	"Gimme Chocolate!!" (ギミチョコ！！)	Mk-metal; Kxbxmetal; Ueda	4:56
3.	"Doki Doki ☆ Morning" (ド・キ・ド・キ☆モーニング)	Nakametal; Norizō; Murakawa	3:55
4.	"Uki Uki ★ Midnight" (ウ・キ・ウ・キ★ミッドナイト)	Ryu-metal; Fuji-metal; Nakata Caos; Team-K	3:27
5.	"Awadama Fever" (あわだまフィーバー)	Mk-metal; Kxbxmetal; Ueda	4:11
6.	"Catch Me If You Can"	Edometal; Narasaki	5:58
7.	"Onedari Daisakusen" (おねだり大作戦)	Nakata Caos; Ryu-metal; Fuji-metal; Team-K	3:18
8.	"Akatsuki" (紅月 -アカツキ-)	Nakametal; Tsubometal	5:33
9.	"Rondo of Nightmare" (悪夢の輪舞曲)	Yuyoyuppe	7:14
10.	"Song 4" (4の歌)	Black Babymetal	7:03
11.	"Yava!" (ヤバッ！)	Nakametal; Mk-metal; Kxbxmetal; Norimetal	3:56
12.	"Iine!" (いいね！)	Nakata Caos; Mish-Mosh	4:13
13.	"Megitsune" (メギツネ)	Mk-metal; Norimetal	6:40
14.	"Ijime, Dame, Zettai" (イジメ、ダメ、ゼッタイ)	Nakametal; Tsubometal; Kxbxmetal; Takemetal	6:04
15.	"Headbangeeeeerrrrr!!!!!" (ヘドバンギャー！！)	Edometal; Nakametal; Narasaki	6:09
16.	"Road of Resistance"	Kitsune of Metal God; Mk-metal; Kxbxmetal; Mish-Mosh; Norimetal; Kyt-metal	9:45
Total length:			88:59

Disc 3 — Babymetal World Tour 2015 in Japan: The Final Chapter Of Trilogy – Act II, 13/12/2015 at Yokohama Arena
No.	Title	Writer(s)	Length
1.	"Babymetal Death"	Kitsune of Metal God	6:06
2.	"Gimme Chocolate!!" (ギミチョコ！！)	Mk-metal; Kxbxmetal; Ueda	4:58
3.	"Iine!" (いいね！)	Nakata Caos; Mish-Mosh	4:19
4.	"Awadama Fever" (あわだまフィーバー)	Mk-metal; Kxbxmetal; Ueda	4:15
5.	"Catch Me If You Can"	Edometal; Narasaki	5:59
6.	"Uki Uki ★ Midnight" (ウ・キ・ウ・キ★ミッドナイト)	Ryu-metal; Fuji-metal; Nakata Caos; Team-K	3:32
7.	"Doki Doki ☆ Morning" (ド・キ・ド・キ☆モーニング)	Nakametal; Norizō; Murakawa	3:55
8.	"Rondo of Nightmare" (悪夢の輪舞曲)	Yuyoyuppe	8:01
9.	"Onedari Daisakusen" (おねだり大作戦)	Nakata Caos; Ryu-metal; Fuji-metal; Team-K	4:53
10.	"Karate"	Yuyoyuppe	4:27
11.	"Yava!" (ヤバッ！)	Nakametal; Mk-metal; Kxbxmetal; Norimetal	3:51
12.	"Megitsune" (メギツネ)	Mk-metal; Norimetal	4:27
13.	"Ijime, Dame, Zettai" (イジメ、ダメ、ゼッタイ)	Nakametal; Tsubometal; Kxbxmetal; Takemetal	9:08
14.	"Headbangeeeeerrrrr!!!!!" (ヘドバンギャー！！)	Edometal; Nakametal; Narasaki	6:08
15.	"Road of Resistance"	Kitsune of Metal God; Mk-metal; Kxbxmetal; Mish-Mosh; Norimetal; Kyt-metal	11:32
16.	"The One"	Kitsune of Metal God; Kxbxmetal; Mish-Mosh	13:03
Total length:			96:36

Notes

- Kami Band performs "Mischiefs of Metal Gods" before "Rondo of Nightmare" in all shows.
- The CD album release of Legend 2015: New Year Fox Festival splits the performance between tracks 12 and 13 onto two separate discs, and lists "Mischiefs of Metal Gods" as a separate track from "Rondo of Nightmare".

=== Release history ===
Legend "2015": New Year Fox Festival

Region	Date	Format	Label	Catalog	Ref.
Japan	14 August 2015	Blu-ray	BMD Fox Records; Amuse, Inc.	ONEB-0003	
Japan	21 October 2015	CD	BMD Fox Records; Amuse, Inc.	ONEC-0001	

Trilogy: Metal Resistance Episode III – Apocalypse

Region	Date	Format	Label	Edition(s)	Catalog	Ref.
Japan	1 September 2016	Blu-ray	BMD Fox Records; Amuse, Inc.	"The One" limited box set	ONEB-0004; ONEB-0005; ONEB-0006	
Japan	19 September 2016	Blu-ray	BMD Fox Records; Amuse, Inc.	Limited video	GTCG-0669; GTCG-0670; GTCG-0671	
Japan	10 October 2021	LP	BMD Fox Records; Amuse, Inc.	Live album	ONEV-0004	
