= Babymetal World Tour 2014 =

Concert tour

- World tour by Babymetal
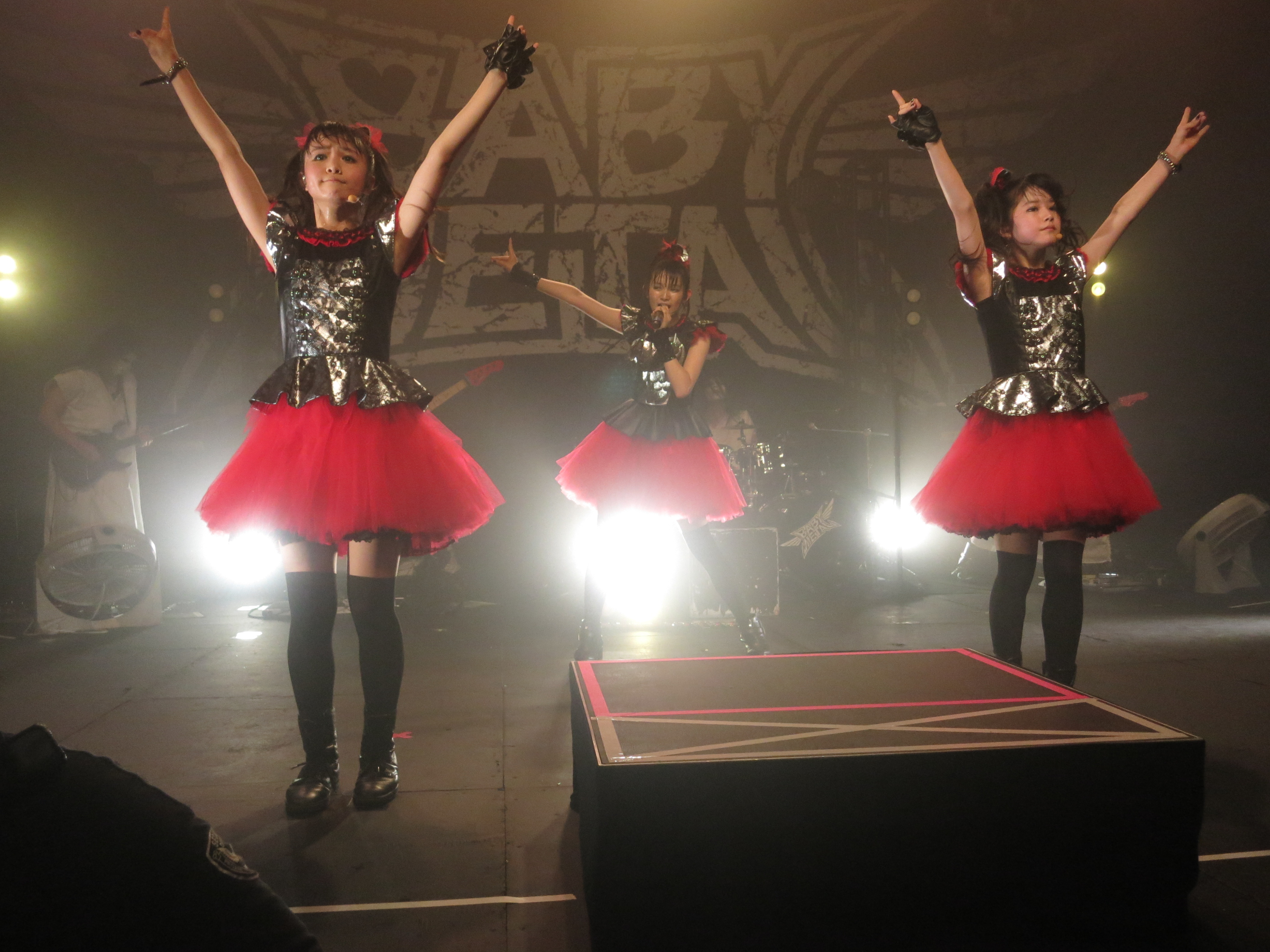
- Babymetal performing live in Los Angeles on 27 July 2014
- Location: North America; Europe; Asia
- Associated album: Babymetal
- Start date: 23 June 2014
- End date: 20 December 2014
- Legs: 8
- No. of shows: 17

Babymetal concert chronology
- Babymetal Death Match Tour 2013: May Revolution (2013); Babymetal World Tour 2014 (2014); Babymetal World Tour 2015 (2015)

The Babymetal World Tour 2014 (stylized in all caps) was the first worldwide concert tour by Japanese band Babymetal. Supporting their eponymous debut album, the tour ran from 23 June 2014 to 20 December 2014, taking place in Japan, the United States, Canada, and several countries in Europe.

== Background ==
On 2 March 2014, at the end of the band's second show at Nippon Budokan, two European shows, Legend "Y" and Legend "M" were announced; these shows, taking place in Paris, France and Cologne, Germany, respectively served as the 15th birthday celebrations for Yuimetal and Moametal, respectively.

The world tour was confirmed on 7 May 2014 with a trailer and several dates announced for European and Japanese legs, marking the second episode of the Metal Resistance. One of the dates included an appearance at Sonisphere Festival in the United Kingdom on 5 July 2014; Alan Day, of the Kilimanjaro Live group (Sonisphere's event promoter), formally invited the band to play in the festival following a successful fan-driven campaign entitled "Babymetal For Sonisphere UK 2014", which Sonisphere later acknowledged on its website. Initially scheduled to play on 6 June at the tent at Bohemia Stage, the performance was moved to 5 June in order to upgrade to the Apollo Main Stage. The next show in the country was set to occur at the Electric Ballroom in London, but was later moved to The Forum due to tickets quickly selling out. On 1 June 2014, a tour date for the United States was revealed.

On the tour, the band performed as an opening act for five shows from Lady Gaga's ArtRave: The Artpop Ball tour, from 30 July 2014 to 6 August 2014, and also made appearances at Heavy Montréal in Canada on 9 August 2014, and Summer Sonic Festival 2014 in Japan on 16 August and 17 August 2014.

After their performance at Summer Sonic in Chiba on 16 August 2014, another leg, titled the Babymetal Back to the USA / UK Tour 2014 (stylized in all caps), was added to the tour, adding dates in November 2014, with the USA concert was to be held in Hammerstein Ballroom in New York City on 4 November, and the UK performance held in O2 Academy Brixton in London on 8 November, which would mark the start of the third episode of the Metal Resistance. On 13 September 2014, Babymetal announced the show Legend "2015": New Year Fox Festival to be held at Saitama Super Arena, Japan on 10 January 2015, after the end of the tour.

In addition to official tour dates, the band also performed secret dates, with the umbrella term "Apocrypha". Knowledge of these performances is generally restricted to members of the "Babymetal Apocalypse Web" official fanclub. The text supplied marked the first time the term "The One" was used by the band; in this instance it referred to a secret society present since the performance Legend "I".

== Broadcast and recording ==
On 13 June 2014, the band announced a live screening of the 7 July concert in London at The Forum to be held at Zepp Tokyo. A live video album of the tour titled Live in London: Babymetal World Tour 2014 was released in Japan on 20 May 2015, and in Europe on 30 October 2015, while highlights from the show made an appearance on the box set Babymetal World Tour 2014 Apocalypse.

== Set list ==
This setlist is representative of the show in Paris, France. It does not represent all dates throughout the tour.

1. "Babymetal Death"
2. "Iine!" (いいね！)
3. "Uki Uki ★ Midnight" (ウ・キ・ウ・キ★ミッドナイト)
4. "Mischiefs of Metal Gods"
5. "Rondo of Nightmare" (悪夢の輪舞曲)
6. "Onedari Daisakusen" (おねだり大作戦)
7. "Catch Me If You Can"
8. "Akatsuki" (紅月 -アカツキ-)
9. "Song 4" (４の歌)
10. "Megitsune" (メギツネ)
11. "Doki Doki ☆ Morning" (ド・キ・ド・キ☆モーニング)
12. "Gimme Chocolate!!" (ギミチョコ！！)
13. "Headbangeeeeerrrrr!!!!!" (ヘドバンギャー！！) (featuring Yuimetal)
14. "Ijime, Dame, Zettai" (イジメ、ダメ、ゼッタイ)

Notes

- During the final tour date on 8 November, Babymetal performed a new song, "Road of Resistance", as the final song.

== Tour dates ==
Date	City	Country	Venue
Asia
23 June 2014 (Note: The concert of 23 June 2014 in Tokyo, Japan at Tsutaya O-East, billed as "Apocrypha – I", only allowed entrance to members of the "Babymetal Apocalypse Web" official fanclub. As with the nature of Apocrypha, these shows are not listed as tour dates.)	Tokyo	Japan	Tsutaya O-East
24 June 2014 (Note: The concert of 24 June 2014 in Tokyo, Japan at Tsutaya O-East is billed as "Apocrypha – II", only allowed entrance to members of the "Babymetal Apocalypse Web" official fanclub. As with the nature of Apocrypha, these shows are not listed as tour dates.)	Tokyo	Japan	Tsutaya O-East
Europe
1 July 2014 (Note: The concert of 1 July 2014 in Paris, France at La Cigale is billed as "Legend "Y" Yuimetal Seitansai".)	Paris	France	La Cigale
3 July 2014 (Note: The concert of 3 July 2014 in Cologne, Germany at the Live Music Hall is billed as "Legend "M" Moametal Seitansai".)	Cologne	Germany	Live Music Hall
5 July 2014 (Note: The concert on 5 July 2014 in Knebworth, United Kingdom at Knewworth House was a part of "Sonisphere Festival".)	Knebworth	England	Knebworth House
7 July 2014	London	England	The Forum
Asia
21 July 2014 (Note: The first concert of 21 July 2014 in Tokyo, Japan at Tsutaya O-East, billed as "Apocrypha – Y", only allowed entrance to members of the "Babymetal Apocalypse Web" official fanclub. As with the nature of Apocrypha, these shows are not listed as tour dates.)	Tokyo	Japan	Tsutaya O-East
21 July 2014 (Note: The second concert of 21 July 2014 in Tokyo, Japan at Tsutaya O-East, billed as "Apocrypha – M", only allowed entrance to members of the "Babymetal Apocalypse Web" official fanclub. As with the nature of Apocrypha, these shows are not listed as tour dates.)	Tokyo	Japan	Tsutaya O-East
North America
27 July 2014	Los Angeles	United States	The Fonda Theatre
9 August 2014 (Note: The concert on 9 August 2014 in Montreal, Canada at Parc Jean-Drapeau was a part of "Heavy Montréal".)	Montreal	Canada	Parc Jean-Drapeau
Asia
16 August 2014 (Note: The concerts on 16 August 2014 in Chiba, Japan at Makuhari Messe and 17 August 2014 in Osaka, Japan at Maishima Sports Island were part of "Summer Sonic Festival".)	Chiba	Japan	Makuhari Messe
17 August 2014	Osaka	Japan	Maishima Sports Island
13 September 2014	Chiba	Japan	Makuhari Messe
14 September 2014	Chiba	Japan	Makuhari Messe
North America
4 November 2014	New York City	United States	Hammerstein Ballroom
Europe
8 November 2014	London	England	O2 Academy Brixton
Asia
20 December 2014 (Note: The concert of 20 December 2014 in Tokyo, Japan at Toyosu Pit, billed as "Apocrypha – S", only allowed entrance to members of the "Babymetal Apocalypse Web" official fanclub. As with the nature of Apocrypha, these shows are not listed as tour dates.)	Tokyo	Japan	Toyosu Pit

== Babymetal World Tour 2014 Apocalypse ==
Babymetal World Tour 2014 Apocalypse

Box set by Babymetal
- Released: 20 May 2015
- Recorded: 2014
- Venue: Various: The Forum, London; O2 Academy Brixton, London; Makuhari Messe, Chiba; La Cigale, Paris; Live Music, Cologne; Sonisphere Festival, Knebworth; The Fonda Theatre, Los Angeles; Heavy Montreal Festival, Montreal; Hammerstein Ballroom, New York
- Genre: Kawaii metal; J-pop; heavy metal
- Length: 164:07 (Blu-ray Disc 1); 94:27 (Blu-ray Disc 2)
- Label: BMD Fox; Amuse
- Producer: Kobametal

On 20 May 2015, the band released the video album Live in London: Babymetal World Tour 2014, containing footage from both solo shows performed in London. Babymetal World Tour 2014 Apocalypse is a member-exclusive box set that was released simultaneously to "The One" fanclub members, containing content of the same shows, as well as other moments of the world tour, including a performance at Makuhari Messe. The latter performance has since been released in vinyl format to commemorate the band's tenth anniversary.

=== Content ===
The box set includes a photo-book of various shows from the Babymetal World Tour 2014 with photography by Dana Distortion (outside Japan) and Miyaaki Shingo (in Japan), a Blu-ray and CD release of Live in London, and a bonus Blu-ray titled "Babymetal World Tour 2014 Apocalypse" containing the second headlining show in Chiba, Japan at Makuhari Messe on 14 September 2014, and performance highlights throughout the rest of the tour. Taking place at the final venue in Japan, a total of 17,000 people attended the two shows. During the performance, the band announced a show set to take place at Saitama Super Arena on 10 January 2015.

=== Track listing ===
Blu-ray Disc 1, CD 1 and 2 — Live in London, The Forum
No.	Title	Writer(s)	Length
1.	"Babymetal Death"	Kitsune of Metal God	7:49
2.	"Iine!"	Nakata Caos; Mish-Mosh	4:12
3.	"Uki Uki ★ Midnight"	Ryu-metal; Fuji-metal; Nakata Caos; Team-K	3:28
4.	"Mischiefs of Metal Gods" (Kami Band instrumental)		3:48
5.	"Rondo of Nightmare"	Yuyoyuppe	4:25
6.	"Onedari Daisakusen"	Nakata Caos; Ryu-metal; Fuji-metal; Team-K	3:26
7.	"Catch Me If You Can"	Edometal; Narasaki	5:59
8.	"Akatsuki"	Nakametal; Tsubometal	6:57
9.	"Song 4"	Black Babymetal	4:16
10.	"Megitsune"	Mk-metal; Norimetal	5:16
11.	"Doki Doki ☆ Morning"	Nakametal; Norizō; Motonari Murakawa	3:46
12.	"Gimme Chocolate!!"	Mk-metal; Kxbxmetal; Takeshi Ueda	6:49
13.	"Headbangeeeeerrrrr!!!!!" (encore)	Edometal; Nakametal; Narasaki	5:47
14.	"Ijime, Dame, Zettai" (encore)	Nakametal; Tsubometal; Kxbxmetal; Takemetal	10:26
Total length:			76:24

Blu-ray Disc 1, CD 3 and 4 — Live in London, O2 Academy Brixton
No.	Title	Writer(s)	Length
1.	"Babymetal Death"	Kitsune of Metal God	6:48
2.	"Iine!"	Nakata Caos; Mish-Mosh	4:14
3.	"Uki Uki ★ Midnight"	Ryu-metal; Fuji-metal; Nakata Caos; Team-K	3:26
4.	"Mischiefs of Metal Gods" (Kami Band instrumental)		3:34
5.	"Rondo of Nightmare"	Yuyoyuppe	4:30
6.	"Song 4"	Black Babymetal	4:28
7.	"Catch Me If You Can"	Edometal; Narasaki	5:54
8.	"Akatsuki"	Nakametal; Tsubometal	6:53
9.	"Onedari Daisakusen"	Nakata Caos; Ryu-metal; Fuji-metal; Team-K	3:28
10.	"Megitsune"	Mk-metal; Norimetal	5:18
11.	"Doki Doki ☆ Morning"	Nakametal; Norizō; Motonari Murakawa	3:47
12.	"Gimme Chocolate!!"	Mk-metal; Kxbxmetal; Takeshi Ueda	5:02
13.	"Ijime, Dame, Zettai"	Nakametal; Tsubometal; Kxbxmetal; Takemetal	8:48
14.	"Headbangeeeeerrrrr!!!!!" (encore)	Edometal; Nakametal; Narasaki	8:28
15.	"Road of Resistance" (encore)	Kitsune of Metal God; Mk-metal; Kxbxmetal; Mish-Mosh; Norimetal; Kyt-metal	13:05
Total length:			87:43

Blu-ray Disc 2, LP — Babymetal World Tour 2014 Apocalypse – 14 September Makuhari Messe
No.	Title	Writer(s)	Length
1.	"Babymetal Death"	Kitsune of Metal God	8:04
2.	"Kimi to Anime ga Mitai – Answer for Animation With You"	Kiba of Akiba	4:03
3.	"Megitsune"	Mk-metal; Norimetal	4:31
4.	"Rondo of Nightmare" (with "Mischiefs of Metal Gods" instrumental)	Yuyoyuppe	9:41
5.	"Onedari Daisakusen"	Nakata Caos; Ryu-metal; Fuji-metal; Team-K	3:25
6.	"Catch Me If You Can"	Edometal; Narasaki	5:55
7.	"Akatsuki"	Nakametal; Tsubometal	6:58
8.	"Song 4"	Black Babymetal	4:31
9.	"Uki Uki ★ Midnight"	Ryu-metal; Fuji-metal; Nakata Caos; Team-K	3:22
10.	"Iine!"	Nakata Caos; Mish-Mosh	4:14
11.	"Doki Doki ☆ Morning"	Nakametal; Norizō; Motonari Murakawa	3:50
12.	"Ijime, Dame, Zettai"	Nakametal; Tsubometal; Kxbxmetal; Takemetal	8:35
13.	"Headbangeeeeerrrrr!!!!!" (encore)	Edometal; Nakametal; Narasaki	5:44
14.	"Gimme Chocolate!!" (encore)	Mk-metal; Kxbxmetal; Takeshi Ueda	9:54
Total length:			82:43

Blu-ray Disc 2 — Babymetal World Tour 2014 Apocalypse
No.	Title	Venue/Festival	Length
1.	"1 July"	La Cigale (Paris, France)	1:37
2.	"3 July"	Live Music (Cologne, Germany)	1:11
3.	"5 July"	Sonisphere Festival (Knebworth, United Kingdom)	2:28
4.	"27 July"	The Fonda Theatre (Los Angeles, USA)	1:27
5.	"9 August"	Heavy Montreal Festival (Montreal, Canada)	2:25
6.	"4 November"	Hammerstein Ballroom (New York, USA)	2:36
Total length:			11:44

Notes

- "Mischiefs of Metal Gods" is only listed as a track on the CD format of Live in London.
- The audio 4-CD set for Live in London splits each performance between tracks 7 and 8 for each show.
- The vinyl release consists only of the 14 tracks from disc two for 14 September Makuhari Messe, split into two LPs.
