= Live at Budokan: Red Night & Black Night Apocalypse =

2015 live album by Babymetal

Video by Babymetal
- Released: January 7, 2015
- Recorded: March 1, 2014 (Red Night); March 2, 2014 (Black Night)
- Venue: Nippon Budokan
- Genre: Kawaii metal; J-pop; heavy metal
- Length: 76:20 (Red Night); 95:30 (Black Night)
- Language: Japanese; English
- Label: BMD Fox; Toy's Factory; Amuse
- Director: Inni Vision
- Producer: Kobametal

Babymetal video chronology
Live: Legend 1999 & 1997 Apocalypse (2014)	Live at Budokan: Red Night & Black Night Apocalypse (2015)	Live in London: Babymetal World Tour 2014 (2015)

Live at Budokan: Red Night & Black Night Apocalypse (Note: Released digitally as separate shows, titled Live at Budokan: Red Night Apocalypse and Live at Budokan: Black Night Apocalypse, respectively.) is the third live video release by the Japanese heavy metal band Babymetal. It contains two concerts performed at Nippon Budokan shortly after the release of the band's eponymous debut album, and was released on January 7, 2015, in a standard edition and a limited-edition box set exclusively for "The One" fanclub members.

Live at Budokan: Red Night & Black Night Apocalypse peaked at number one on the Oricon Blu-ray chart, making the band the youngest female act to top the chart.

== Background ==
The concerts at Nippon Budokan were first announced at the show Legend "1997" Su-metal Seitansai on December 21, 2013, in conjunction with the announcement of the band's eponymous debut album Babymetal. Ticket were made available until December 24, 2013 on the band's official website and the "Babymetal Apocalypse Web" fansite. Tickets to the first show were delivered along with corsets, approximately 10,000 fans attended the first concert.

On November 10, 2014, audio and releases for the shows were announced in several formats: 2-DVD and Blu-ray releases of both shows, a CD release of the first show, and a "The One" fanclub-exclusive box set "Budo-can" bundled with the video and a CD release of the second show. All formats were set for release on January 7, 2015. A trailer was posted on YouTube on December 19, 2014, containing footage from the shows.

== Development ==
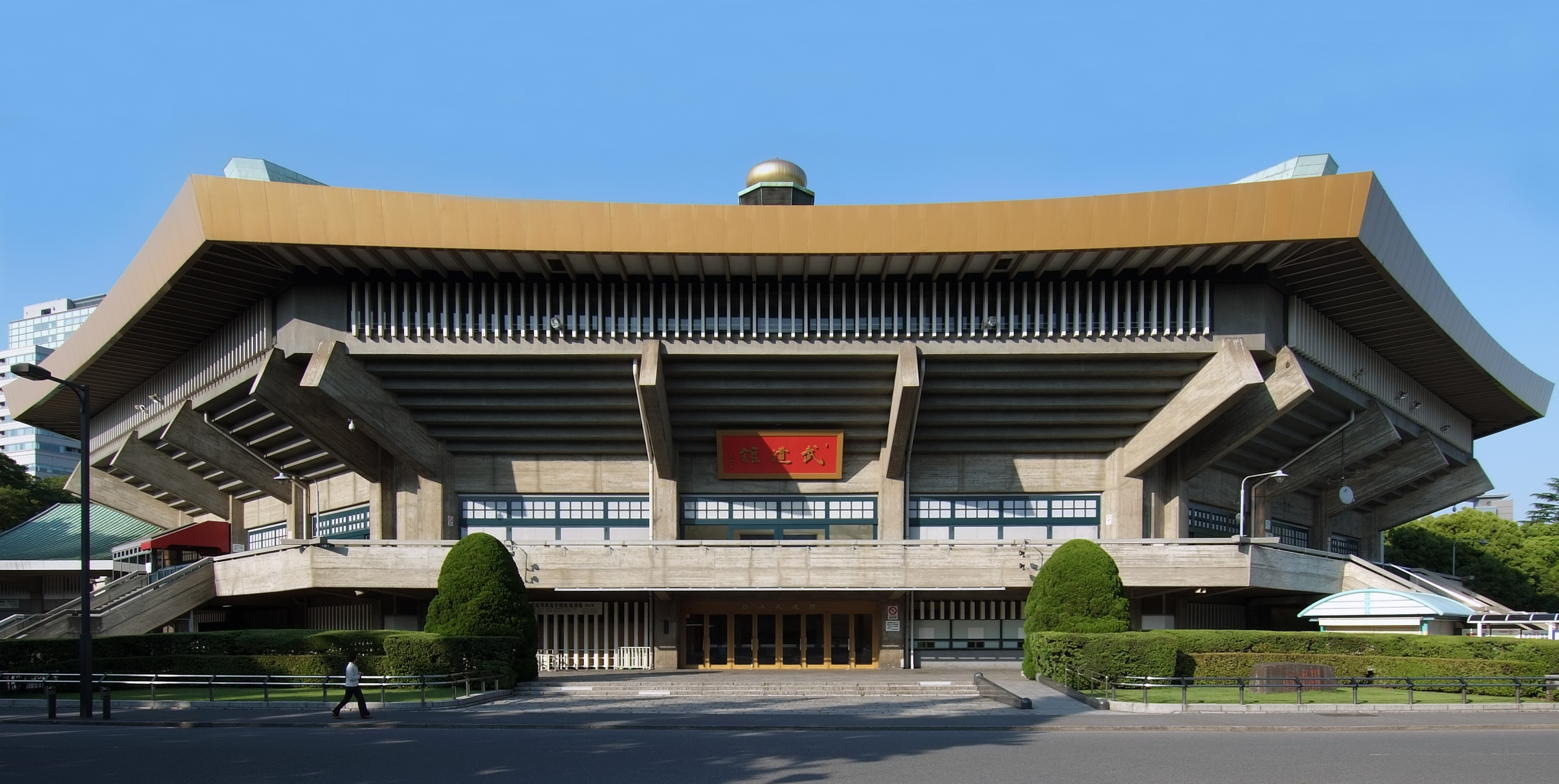
At the average age of 14.6, Babymetal became the youngest band to perform at the Nippon Budokan.

The venue consisted of an octagonal stage at the center of the Budokan, with television monitors hanging down from the ceiling. Surrounding the stage were four circular stages connected to the main stage with runways.

For the first show, audience members were handed neck corsets for the Corset Festival and told not to take them off during the show, and the audience were only able to stand during the performance. For the second show, the performance appears to be more theatrical, contrasting the more straightforward show of the first day.

After the accident during the performance of "Headbangeeeeerrrrr!!!!!" on the first day, where Yuimetal fell off a stage runway during the bridge, an update was posted to Twitter confirming Yuimetal was fine. The stage for the second day remained mostly the same, but with added barriers along the runways leading to the stage.

== Content ==
The performance on March 1, subtitled Red Night, begins with the stage darkening. The band's manager Kobametal appears on the screen above the stage, declaring "This live performance will have no MC or encore. It begins when you wear your corsets." as the members of the Kami Band appear on stage, performing all the music live. He also clarifies that the show was different from the band's Legend "Corset Festival" performed at Meguro Rock May Kan the previous year, calling the current show Legend "Corset Festival Extra". At the end of the narration, the line "kitsune kitsune" is looped repeatedly. The three band members ascend to the main stage in three circular stages, which transitions to the first song, "Megitsune". During the performances of "Doki Doki ☆ Morning" and "Gimme Chocolate!!", the audience proceed to form moshing circles. "Iine!" is accompanied with laser lights, Sumetal shouting "Budokan" at the bridge, and a collaborative headbang at the breakdown. "Catch Me If You Can" is preceded by Kami Band solos, and "Uki Uki ★ Midnight" is followed by Su-metal's solo "Rondo of Nightmare". Next, Black Babymetal perform their songs "Onedari Daisakusen" and "Song 4", which is followed up by Su-metal shouting "Akatsuki da!" for "Akatsuki". "Babymetal Death" plays next, which leaves the arena chanting "Death!". During the performance of "Headbangeeeeerrrrr!!!!!", however, Yuimetal remained out of view after the bridge of the song. Afterwards, the venue goes dark for a few minutes, transitioning to the final song, "Ijime, Dame, Zettai", during which Yuimetal has returned, but Moametal slipped and fell while running around the circumference of the stage. The show ends with the three members shouting "We are!", as the audience responds "Babymetal!".

The March 2 performance, subtitled Black Night, begins with a video prologue narrating the beginning of Legend "Doomsday", as the band begins the concert with "Babymetal Death". At the bridge of "Iine!", Su-metal shows the word "Doomsday". Next the band performs "Kimi to Anime Ga Mitai – Answer for Animation With You", where the three members dance at high-speed throughout the stage. Following the Black Babymetal songs "Onedari Daisakusen" and "Song 4", narration tells the story of a girl, which is followed by Su-metal performing the ballad "No Rain, No Rainbow" as well as "Akatsuki". Next, the band performs "Catch Me If You Can" all the way to "Ijime, Dame, Zettai". As the band finished the latter song, the stage darkens for a while, until the band members begin performing "Doki Doki ☆ Morning", which has been interpreted as the band returning to its roots. At the end of the final song "Headbangeeeeerrrrr!!!!!", Su-metal rings a gong, and an audio epilogue explains that Episode I of the Metal Resistance in Japan has concluded, and the band would continue to perform overseas. On the stage, the members are called by name, guided into their individual coffins, and ascending into the sky, as the screen promotes the concerts Legend "Y" and Legend "M" in Europe, for birthday concerts dedicated to Mizuno and Kikuchi, respectively.

== Reception ==
Live at Budokan: Red Night & Black Night Apocalypse debuted at number three and one on the Oricon weekly DVD and Blu-ray charts, respectively, for the week of January 19, 2015, with first-week sales of approximately 17,000 Blu-ray copies. In addition to the band having their first number-one Blu-ray release, the three members became the youngest female artists (average age 15.7) to top the chart, surpassing Momoiro Clover Z's Momoiro Christmas 2011: Saitama Super Arena Taikai in 2012 (age 16.6). The video also charted in the same positions for the music video sub-charts the same week.

== Track listing ==
Live at Budokan: Red Night Apocalypse Red Night – Legend "Corset Festival Extra" Tenkaichi Metal Budokai Final (赤い夜 LEGEND “巨大コルセット祭り”~天下一メタル武道会ファイナル~)
No.	Title	Writer(s)	Length
1.	"Megitsune" (メギツネ)	Mk-metal; Norimetal	8:57
2.	"Doki Doki ☆ Morning" (ド・キ・ド・キ☆モーニング)	Nakametal; Norizō; Motonari Murakawa	4:03
3.	"Gimme Chocolate!!" (ギミチョコ！！)	Mk-metal; Kxbxmetal; Takeshi Ueda	3:58
4.	"Iine!" (いいね！)	Nakata Caos; Mish-Mosh	4:17
5.	"Catch Me If You Can"	Edometal; Narasaki	5:54
6.	"Uki Uki ★ Midnight" (ウ・キ・ウ・キ★ミッドナイト)	Ryu-metal; Fuji-metal; Nakata Caos; Team-K	3:40
7.	"Mischiefs of Metal Gods" (Kami Band instrumental)		3:22
8.	"Rondo of Nightmare" (悪夢の輪舞曲)	Yuyoyuppe	3:36
9.	"Onedari Daisakusen" (おねだり大作戦)	Nakata Caos; Ryu-metal; Fuji-metal; Team-K	3:42
10.	"Song 4" (4の歌)	Black Babymetal	6:01
11.	"Akatsuki" (紅月 -アカツキ-)	Nakametal; Tsubometal	5:31
12.	"Babymetal Death"	Kitsune of Metal God	5:52
13.	"Headbangeeeeerrrrr!!!!!" (ヘドバンギャー！！)	Edometal; Nakametal; Narasaki	6:03
14.	"Ijime, Dame, Zettai" (イジメ、ダメ、ゼッタイ)	Nakametal; Tsubometal; Kxbxmetal; Takemetal	11:24
Total length:			76:20

Live at Budokan: Black Night Apocalypse Black Night – Legend "Doomsday" Shokan no Gi (黒い夜 LEGEND “DOOMSDAY” ~召喚の儀~)
No.	Title	Writer(s)	Length
1.	"Babymetal Death"	Kitsune of Metal God	7:15
2.	"Iine!" (いいね！)	Nakata Caos; Mish-Mosh	4:17
3.	"Kimi to Anime Ga Mitai – Answer for Animation With You" (君とアニメが見たい～Answer for Animation With You)	Kiba of Akiba	4:02
4.	"Onedari Daisakusen" (おねだり大作戦)	Nakata Caos; Ryu-metal; Fuji-metal; Team-K	4:57
5.	"Song 4" (4の歌)	Black Babymetal	5:54
6.	"No Rain, No Rainbow"	Yoshifu-metal; Mk-metal; Nakametal	5:17
7.	"Akatsuki" (紅月 -アカツキ-)	Nakametal; Tsubometal	5:37
8.	"Catch Me If You Can"	Edometal; Narasaki	5:54
9.	"Uki Uki ★ Midnight" (ウ・キ・ウ・キ★ミッドナイト)	Ryu-metal; Fuji-metal; Nakata Caos; Team-K	3:41
10.	"Gimme Chocolate!!" (ギミチョコ！！)	Mk-metal; Kxbxmetal; Takeshi Ueda	4:03
11.	"Mischiefs of Metal Gods" (Kami Band instrumental)		3:22
12.	"Rondo of Nightmare" (悪夢の輪舞曲)	Yuyoyuppe	3:39
13.	"Megitsune" (メギツネ)	Mk-metal; Norimetal	5:23
14.	"Ijime, Dame, Zettai" (イジメ、ダメ、ゼッタイ)	Nakametal; Tsubometal; Kxbxmetal; Takemetal	10:02
15.	"Doki Doki ☆ Morning" (ド・キ・ド・キ☆モーニング)	Nakametal; Norizō; Motonari Murakawa	5:50
16.	"Headbangeeeeerrrrr!!!!!" (ヘドバンギャー！！)	Edometal; Nakametal; Narasaki	16:17
Total length:			95:30

Notes

- "Mischiefs of Metal Gods" is not listed in the track listings.

== Personnel ==
Credits adapted from Live at Budokan: Red Night & Black Night Apocalypse booklet.

- Su-metal (Suzuka Nakamoto) – lead and background vocals, dance
- Yuimetal (Yui Mizuno) – lead and background vocals (credited as "scream"), dance
- Moametal (Moa Kikuchi) – lead and background vocals (credited as "scream"), dance

== Charts ==
=== Weekly charts ===
Chart (2015)	Peak position
Japanese DVD (Oricon)	3
Japanese Music DVD (Oricon)	3
Japanese Blu-ray (Oricon)	1
Japanese Music Blu-ray (Oricon)	1
UK Music Videos (Official Charts)	14

=== Daily charts ===
Chart (2015)	Peak position
Japanese DVD (Oricon)	2
Japanese Music DVD (Oricon)	2
Japanese Blu-ray (Oricon)	1

== Release history ==
Region	Date	Format	Label	Edition(s)	Catalog	Ref.
Japan	January 7, 2015	DVD; Blu-ray	BMD Fox Records; Toy's Factory; Amuse, Inc.	Standard	TFBQ-18161; TFXQ-78119	
Japan	January 7, 2015	DVD, CD; Blu-ray, CD	BMD Fox Records; Toy's Factory; Amuse, Inc.	"Budo-can" limited	PPTF-8074	
Worldwide	January 7, 2015	Digital download	Amuse, Inc.	Standard (Red Night Apocalypse and Black Night Apocalypse)	—N/a	
Worldwide	January 31, 2015	Streaming	Amuse, Inc.	Standard (Red Night Apocalypse and Black Night Apocalypse)	—N/a	
Europe	October 30, 2015	DVD; Blu-ray	earMusic	Standard	EMU0210724; EMU0210725	

== Live at Budokan: Red Night ==
Live at Budokan: Red Night

Live album by Babymetal
- Released: January 7, 2015
- Recorded: March 1, 2014
- Venue: Nippon Budokan
- Genre: Kawaii metal; J-pop; heavy metal
- Length: 66:06
- Language: Japanese; English
- Label: BMD Fox; Toy's Factory; Amuse
- Producer: Kobametal

Babymetal chronology
Babymetal (2014)	Live at Budokan: Red Night (2015)	Metal Resistance (2016)

Live at Budokan: Red Night is the first live album by Babymetal. The album was released in Japan on January 7, 2015 by BMD Fox Records and Toy's Factory, and in Europe on October 30, 2015 by earMusic, featuring audio from the first live performance at Nippon Budokan on March 1, 2014.

=== Background ===
Live at Budokan: Red Night was announced alongside the video release Live at Budokan: Red Night & Black Night Apocalypse on November 10, 2014. The album contains audio taken from the band's headlining show Red Night – Legend "Corset Festival Extra" Tenkaichi Metal Budokai Final on March 1, 2014 at Nippon Budokan. The album was mastered by Grammy Award winner Ted Jensen at Sterling Sound, NYC. Jensen wanted to produce it in a way as to enjoy the presence and live feeling of being at the venue.

In Japan, pre-orders for first-press limited editions of the album received a music card with a code to download the song "Road of Resistance" from the iTunes Store or Recochoku for free. The song was first premiered at a show in London, and was later announced as a collaboration with DragonForce guitarists Herman Li and Sam Totman. The album would later be released in several formats to Europe and the United Kingdom on October 30, 2015, including a limited edition bundle that came with a DVD of Live at Budokan: Red Night Apocalypse, and a vinyl format on August 25, 2021 to commemorate the band's tenth anniversary.

=== Reception ===
Live at Budokan: Red Night was positively reviewed by Billboard Japan, stating that the work emphasized the talent of the performers over the idol appeal prominent on Babymetal. The album was praised for the "live" sound of the guitars and drums, and the vocal performance of the three members, particularly lead singer Nakamoto, commenting that although some parts of the work had shaky vocals, it was made up by the strong performance in the rest of the album. Jensen's contribution to the album was also reviewed positively, suggesting that the band's production team's appointment of high-profile musicians prioritizes the quality of the music. The album was also described as a potential success as both a live metal album and a pop album.

In Japan, Live at Budokan: Red Night debuted at number three on the Oricon Weekly Albums chart for the week of January 19, 2015, selling approximately 24,000 copies in the first week, and charting higher than the band's eponymous debut album. This marked the first time in eleven years that a live album by a girl group charted in the top three positions since the Twelve Girls Band live album Kiseki in 2003. The album also peaked at number three on the Billboard Japan Hot Albums chart.

With its international digital release, Live at Budokan: Red Night charted at number 21 on the Heatseekers Albums chart in the United States, and number 18 on the Independent Albums Breakers chart in the United Kingdom. The album also topped the iTunes Metal charts in the United States, United Kingdom, Canada, and Germany.

=== Track listing ===
No.	Title	Writer(s)	Length
1.	"Megitsune" (メギツネ)	Mk-metal; Norimetal	5:19
2.	"Doki Doki ☆ Morning" (ド・キ・ド・キ☆モーニング)	Nakametal; Norizō; Motonari Murakawa	4:02
3.	"Gimme Chocolate!!" (ギミチョコ！！)	Mk-metal; Kxbxmetal; Takeshi Ueda	3:58
4.	"Iine!" (いいね！)	Nakata Caos; Mish-Mosh	4:15
5.	"Catch Me If You Can"	Edometal; Narasaki	5:54
6.	"Uki Uki ★ Midnight" (ウ・キ・ウ・キ★ミッドナイト)	Ryu-metal; Fuji-metal; Nakata Caos; Team-K	3:29
7.	"Rondo of Nightmare" (悪夢の輪舞曲)	Yuyoyuppe	3:41
8.	"Onedari Daisakusen" (おねだり大作戦)	Nakata Caos; Ryu-metal; Fuji-metal; Team-K	3:37
9.	"Song 4" (4の歌)	Black Babymetal	6:00
10.	"Akatsuki" (紅月 -アカツキ-)	Nakametal; Tsubometal	5:31
11.	"Babymetal Death"	Kitsune of Metal God	5:51
12.	"Headbangeeeeerrrrr!!!!!" (ヘドバンギャー！！)	Edometal; Nakametal; Narasaki	5:31
13.	"Ijime, Dame, Zettai" (イジメ、ダメ、ゼッタイ)	Nakametal; Tsubometal; Kxbxmetal; Takemetal	8:58
Total length:			66:06

iTunes Store, Recochoku, and limited edition bonus track
No.	Title	Writer(s)	Length
14.	"Road of Resistance"	Kitsune of Metal God; Mk-metal; Kxbxmetal; Mish-Mosh; Norimetal; Kyt-metal	5:19
Total length:			71:25

=== Personnel ===
Credits adapted from Live at Budokan: Red Night booklet.

- Su-metal (Suzuka Nakamoto) – lead and background vocals
- Yuimetal (Yui Mizuno) – lead and background vocals (credited as "scream")
- Moametal (Moa Kikuchi) – lead and background vocals (credited as "scream")
- Ted Jensen – mastering

=== Charts ===
==== Weekly charts ====
Chart (2015–2021)	Peak position
Japanese Albums (Oricon)	3
Japanese Albums (Billboard)	3
UK Independent Albums Breakers (OCC)	18
US Heatseekers Albums (Billboard)	21
US World Albums (Billboard)	3

==== Daily charts ====
Chart (2015)	Peak position
Japanese Albums (Oricon)	2

==== Monthly charts ====
Chart (2015)	Peak position
Japanese Albums (Oricon)	13

=== Release history ===
Region	Date	Format	Label	Edition(s)	Catalog	Ref.
Worldwide	January 7, 2015	Digital download	Amuse, Inc.	Standard	—N/a	
Japan	January 7, 2015	CD	BMD Fox Records; Toy's Factory; Amuse, Inc.	Standard	TFCC-86503	
Japan	January 7, 2015	CD	BMD Fox Records; Toy's Factory; Amuse, Inc.	Limited	TFCC-86502	
Europe	October 30, 2015	CD, DVD	earMusic	Limited	EMU0210723	
Europe	October 30, 2015	Digital download	earMusic	Standard	—N/a	
Japan	December 30, 2016	Streaming	Amuse, Inc.	Standard	—N/a	
Taiwan	December 30, 2016	Streaming	Amuse, Inc.	Standard	—N/a	
Hong Kong	December 30, 2016	Streaming	Amuse, Inc.	Standard	—N/a	
Singapore	December 30, 2016	Streaming	Amuse, Inc.	Standard	—N/a	
Malaysia	December 30, 2016	Streaming	Amuse, Inc.	Standard	—N/a	
Japan	August 25, 2021	LP	BMD Fox Records; Toy's Factory; Amuse, Inc.	Standard	TFJC-38071/2	

== Budo-can ==
Live at Budokan: Black Night

Live album by Babymetal
- Released: January 7, 2015
- Recorded: March 2, 2014
- Venue: Nippon Budokan
- Genre: Kawaii metal; J-pop; heavy metal
- Length: 72:01
- Language: Japanese; English
- Label: BMD Fox; Toy's Factory; Amuse
- Producer: Kobametal

The Budo-can is a member-exclusive box set by Babymetal. It was released on January 7, 2015 in Japan, in limited quantities to "The One" fanclub members, and contained either a DVD or Blu-ray release of Live at Budokan: Red Night & Black Night Apocalypse, and the exclusive live album Live at Budokan: Black Night (stylized as LIVE AT BUDOKAN 〜BLACK NIGHT〜), which contained audio from the second show at Nippon Budokan, excluding the songs "Kimi to Anime Ga Mitai – Answer for Animation With You" and "No Rain, No Rainbow".

Live at Budokan: Black Night is set to re-released on October 10, 2021 as a "The One" fanclub exclusive in vinyl format.

Live at Budokan: Black Night track listing
No.	Title	Writer(s)	Length
1.	"Babymetal Death"	Kitsune of Metal God	7:06
2.	"Iine!" (いいね！)	Nakata Caos; Mish-Mosh	4:13
3.	"Onedari Daisakusen" (おねだり大作戦)	Nakata Caos; Ryu-metal; Fuji-metal; Team-K	3:23
4.	"Song 4" (4の歌)	Black Babymetal	5:54
5.	"Akatsuki" (紅月 -アカツキ-)	Nakametal; Tsubometal	5:35
6.	"Catch Me If You Can"	Edometal; Narasaki	5:55
7.	"Uki Uki ★ Midnight" (ウ・キ・ウ・キ★ミッドナイト)	Ryu-metal; Fuji-metal; Nakata Caos; Team-K	3:40
8.	"Gimme Chocolate!!" (ギミチョコ！！)	Mk-metal; Kxbxmetal; Takeshi Ueda	4:00
9.	"Mischiefs of Metal Gods" (Kami Band instrumental)		3:21
10.	"Rondo of Nightmare" (悪夢の輪舞曲)	Yuyoyuppe	3:41
11.	"Megitsune" (メギツネ)	Mk-metal; Norimetal	5:22
12.	"Ijime, Dame, Zettai" (イジメ、ダメ、ゼッタイ)	Nakametal; Tsubometal; Kxbxmetal; Takemetal	9:21
13.	"Doki Doki ☆ Morning" (ド・キ・ド・キ☆モーニング)	Nakametal; Norizō; Motonari Murakawa	3:58
14.	"Headbangeeeeerrrrr!!!!!" (ヘドバンギャー！！)	Edometal; Nakametal; Narasaki	6:32
Total length:			72:01

Notes

- "Mischiefs of Metal Gods" is stylized as "Mischiefs of metal gods".
