= Live: Legend I, D, Z Apocalypse =

Video album by Babymetal

- Blu-ray cover

Live album and video by Babymetal
- Released: November 20, 2013 (Blu-ray); August 25, 2021 (live album)
- Recorded: October 6, 2012 (Legend "I"); December 20, 2012 (Legend "D"); February 1, 2013 (Legend "Z")
- Venues: Shibuya O-East (Legend "I"); Akasaka Blitz (Legend "D"); Zepp Tokyo (Legend "Z")
- Genres: Kawaii metal; J-pop; heavy metal
- Length: 52:48 (Legend "I"); 62:11 (Legend "D"); 66:59 (Legend "Z")
- Labels: BMD Fox; Toy's Factory; Amuse
- Director: Inni Vision
- Producer: Kobametal

Babymetal album chronology
10 Babymetal Years (2020)	Live: Legend I, D, Z Apocalypse (2021)	Live: Legend 1999 & 1997 Apocalypse (2021)

Babymetal video chronology
Live: Legend I, D, Z Apocalypse (2013)	Live: Legend 1999 & 1997 Apocalypse (2014)

Live: Legend I, D, Z Apocalypse is the first video album by Japanese heavy metal band Babymetal. The album contains live footage of three shows, entitled Legend "I", Legend "D", and Legend "Z", respectively (spelling out the initials of "Ijime, Dame, Zettai"), performed in Tokyo from late 2012 to early 2013. The album was released for general sale in Blu-ray format on November 20, 2013.

== Background ==
On July 7, 2012, Babymetal announced the first of three shows to be performed on October 6, 2012 at the venue Shibuya O-East, the same location for the concert Legend Corset Festival to promote the single "Headbangeeeeerrrrr!!!!!". Tickets were made available for presale starting August 20, 2012, and sold out on September 8, 2012. After the end of each show, the band announced the next show set for December 20, 2012 at Akasaka Blitz and February 1, 2013 at Zepp Tokyo, respectively, with tickets immediately available for presale.

Live: Legend I, D, Z Apocalypse was first announced with a posted trailer on September 24, 2013. The initial release on October 19, 2013 consisted of a three-disc DVD box set limited to 1,500 copies, and exclusively sold via Tower Records and in the Tokyo (Shinjuku) Beams Japan store. The DVD release was promoted as part of "Tower Records Shinjuku 15th Anniversary Thanksgiving – Festival of 15", and was featured in the idol project "No Music, No Idol?".

The video was later released on Blu-ray version on November 20, 2013. The video contains all three concerts that the band gave in Tokyo as its first set of headlining shows (natively called "one-man live", a wasei-eigo term for an entire concert performed only by one artist): on October 6 at Shibuya O-East, on December 20, 2012 at Akasaka Blitz, and on February 1, 2013 at Zepp Tokyo.

The album has since been released in a vinyl format on August 25, 2021 to commemorate the band's tenth anniversary.

== Content ==
The band performed live at Shibuya O-East on October 6, 2012, beginning with the opening track "Babymetal Death". After performing more songs, Nakamoto leaves the stage while Mizuno and Kikuchi debut the song "Onedari Daisakusen", performing as Black Babymetal while wearing black hooded jackets and grasping a towel, shouting chants "Katte!" (Buy!) and "Chōdai!" (Please!). Next, Nakamoto performs the new song "Akatsuki", with the performance emphasizing vocal ability over melody. After the performance of "Doki Doki ☆ Morning", the three members leave the stage and apparently end the show shouting "See you!". However, the members eventually return to the stage via coffins, and, for the first time, perform the music with a live band in the encore. After "Ijime, Dame, Zettai" ends, the song is announced for a single release on January 9, 2013.

Next, the band performed at Akasaka Blitz on December 20, 2012, nearly coinciding with Nakamoto's fifteenth birthday. Three covers are performed, including a cover of the Speed song "White Love" performed solely by Nakamoto, the Karen Girl's song "Over The Future" (of which Nakamoto was a member), and the folk song "Tsubasa o Kudasai" in the encore. The band also performs a remix of their song "Headbangeeeeerrrrr!!!!!", which contains elements of dubstep. In the encore, a video interlude explains that Nakamoto must rescue Mizuno and Kikuchi, and the concert ends with her apparent crucifixion.

For the last of three concerts, Babymetal performed at Zepp Tokyo on February 1, 2013. In continuation of the events from the previous concert, Nakamoto begins on stage crucified, then performs "Ijime, Dame, Zettai" with Mizuno and Kikuchi. In the concert, the band performs the song "Catch Me If You Can" live for the first time, which appeared on the band's newly released single "Ijime, Dame, Zettai". In the encore, a clock counts down to 00:00:00, at which point Nakamoto whispers "We are…" with the audience shouting "Babymetal!"; this repeats with increasing volume until the band begins to perform "Babymetal Death" live. At this point, the three members of the band are draped in white stage costumes. At the end of the show, an announcement is made for another concert at NHK Hall on June 30, while the management reveals that Babymetal would remain active after Nakamoto leaves Sakura Gakuin.

== Reception ==
Live: Legend I, D, Z Apocalypse debuted on the Oricon weekly Blu-ray chart at number seven for the week of December 2, 2013, with first-week sales of 4,908 copies. The video also charted at number two for the music video sub-chart the same week.

== Track listing ==
Legend "I" 10/6/2012 at Shibuya O-East (LEGEND“I” 2012/10/6 at Shibuya O-EAST)
No.	Title	Writer(s)	Length
1.	"Babymetal Death"	Kitsune of Metal God	5:50
2.	"Iine!" (いいね！)	Nakata Caos; Mish-Mosh	4:18
3.	"Kimi to Anime Ga Mitai – Answer for Animation With You" (君とアニメが見たい 〜Answer for Animation With You)	Kiba of Akiba	4:00
4.	"Uki Uki ★ Midnight" (ウ・キ・ウ・キ★ミッドナイト)	Ryu-metal; Fuji-metal; Nakata Caos; Team-K	3:32
5.	"Onedari Daisakusen" (おねだり大作戦)	Nakata Caos; Ryu-metal; Fuji-metal; Team-K	4:51
6.	"Akatsuki" (紅月 -アカツキ-)	Nakametal; Tsubometal	6:30
7.	"Doki Doki ☆ Morning" (ド・キ・ド・キ☆モーニング)	Nakametal; Norizō; Motonari Murakawa	4:23
8.	"Headbangeeeeerrrrr!!!!!" (ヘドバンギャー！！) (encore)	Edometal; Nakametal; Narasaki	9:26
9.	"Ijime, Dame, Zettai" (イジメ、ダメ、ゼッタイ) (encore)	Nakametal; Tsubometal; Kxbxmetal; Takemetal	9:58
Total length:			52:48

Legend "D" Su-metal Seitansai 12/20/2012 at Akasaka Blitz (LEGEND“D”SU-METAL聖誕祭 2012/12/20 at Akasaka BLITZ)
No.	Title	Writer(s)	Length
1.	"Babymetal Death"	Kitsune of Metal God	5:46
2.	"Kimi to Anime Ga Mitai – Answer for Animation With You" (君とアニメが見たい～Answer for Animation With You)	Kiba of Akiba	4:00
3.	"Uki Uki ★ Midnight" (ウ・キ・ウ・キ★ミッドナイト)	Ryu-metal; Fuji-metal; Nakata Caos; Team-K	3:44
4.	"White Love" (Angel of Death ver.) (Speed cover)	Hiromasa Ijichi	5:27
5.	"Over the Future" (Rising Force ver.) (Karen Girl's cover)	Sumiyo Mutsumi; Takashi Saeki	4:08
6.	"Headbangeeeeerrrrr!!!!!" (Night of 15 mix) (ヘドバンギャー！！ -Night of 15 mix-)	Edometal; Nakametal; Narasaki	4:41
7.	"Onedari Daisakusen" (おねだり大作戦)	Nakata Caos; Ryu-metal; Fuji-metal; Team-K	4:53
8.	"Doki Doki ☆ Morning" (ド・キ・ド・キ☆モーニング)	Nakametal; Norizō; Motonari Murakawa	4:16
9.	"Iine!" (いいね！)	Nakata Caos; Mish-Mosh	4:14
10.	"Ijime, Dame, Zettai" (イジメ、ダメ、ゼッタイ)	Nakametal; Tsubometal; Kxbxmetal; Takemetal	7:44
11.	"Headbangeeeeerrrr!!!!!" (ヘドバンギャー！！) (encore)	Edometal; Nakametal; Narasaki	8:37
12.	"Tsubasa o Kudasai" (Honoo ver.) (翼をください -炎 ver.-) (encore)	Michio Yamagami; Kunihiko Murai	4:40
Total length:			62:11

Legend "Z" 2/1/2013 at Zepp Tokyo (LEGEND“Z” 2013/2/1 at Zepp Tokyo)
No.	Title	Writer(s)	Length
1.	"Ijime, Dame, Zettai" (イジメ、ダメ、ゼッタイ)	Nakametal; Tsubometal; Kxbxmetal; Takemetal	7:23
2.	"Iine!" (いいね！)	Nakata Caos; Mish-Mosh	4:15
3.	"Kimi to Anime Ga Mitai – Answer for Animation With You" (君とアニメが見たい～Answer for Animation With You)	Kiba of Akiba	4:00
4.	"Onedari Daisakusen" (おねだり大作戦)	Nakata Caos; Ryu-metal; Fuji-metal; Team-K	4:48
5.	"Akatsuki" (紅月 -アカツキ-)	Nakametal; Tsubometal	6:34
6.	"Uki Uki ★ Midnight" (ウ・キ・ウ・キ★ミッドナイト)	Ryu-metal; Fuji-metal; Nakata Caos; Team-K	3:43
7.	"Catch Me If You Can"	Edometal; Narasaki	3:57
8.	"Doki Doki ☆ Morning" (ド・キ・ド・キ☆モーニング)	Nakametal; Norizō; Motonari Murakawa	4:21
9.	"Headbangeeeeerrrrr!!!!!" (ヘドバンギャー！！) (encore)	Edometal; Nakametal; Narasaki	9:09
10.	"Babymetal Death" (encore)	Kitsune of Metal God	8:51
11.	"Ijime, Dame, Zettai" (イジメ、ダメ、ゼッタイ) (encore)	Nakametal; Tsubometal; Kxbxmetal; Takemetal	9:58
Total length:			66:59

Notes

- "Kimi to Anime Ga Mitai – Answer for Animation With You", "White Love", "Over the Future", and "Tsubasa o Kudasai" are excluded from the digital live album release.

== Personnel ==
Credits adapted from Live: Legend I, D, Z Apocalypse booklet.

- Su-metal (Suzuka Nakamoto) – lead and background vocals, dance
- Yuimetal (Yui Mizuno) – lead and background vocals (credited as "scream"), dance
- Moametal (Moa Kikuchi) – lead and background vocals (credited as "scream"), dance
- Arai Hiroki – guitar
- Shiren – guitar
- Ryo – bass
- Shin – drums
- Takayoshi Ohmura – guitar
- Ikuo – bass
- Hideki Aoyama – drums
- Hidefumi Usami – arrangement

== Charts ==
Charts (2013–2021)	Peak position
Japanese Albums (Oricon)	150
Japanese Blu-ray (Oricon)	7
Japanese Music Blu-ray (Oricon)	2

== Release history ==
Region	Date	Format	Label	Edition(s)	Catalog	Ref.
Japan	October 19, 2013	DVD	BMD Fox Records; Toy's Factory; Amuse, Inc.	Limited box set	PPTF-1012	
Japan	November 20, 2013	Blu-ray	BMD Fox Records; Toy's Factory; Amuse, Inc.	Standard	TFXQ-78112	
Worldwide	November 20, 2013	Digital download	Toy's Factory	Standard	—N/a	
Worldwide	April 12, 2017	Streaming	Amuse, Inc.	Standard	—N/a	
Japan	August 25, 2021	LP	BMD Fox Records; Toy's Factory; Amuse, Inc.	Live album	TFJC-38061/6	
