= Road of Resistance =

Single by Babymetal

from the album Babymetal and Metal Resistance
- Language: Japanese; English
- Released: February 1, 2015
- Genre: Kawaii metal; power metal
- Length: 5:19
- Label: BMD Fox; Toy's Factory; Sony Music Entertainment
- Composers: Mish-Mosh; Norimetal; Kyt-metal
- Lyricists: Kitsune of Metal God; Mk-metal; Kxbxmetal
- Producers: Kobametal; Kyoto (arrangement)

Babymetal singles chronology
"Megitsune" (2013)	"Road of Resistance" (2015)	"Gimme Chocolate!!" (2015)

Music video
- "Road of Resistance" (Live in Japan) - YouTube

"Road of Resistance" is a song by the Japanese Kawaii metal band Babymetal. The song was released worldwide as a digital single on February 1, 2015 by Toy's Factory, serving as the lead single off the international re-release of the album Babymetal, as well the opening track from Metal Resistance. The official live music video gaining over 34 million views on YouTube.

== Background and release ==
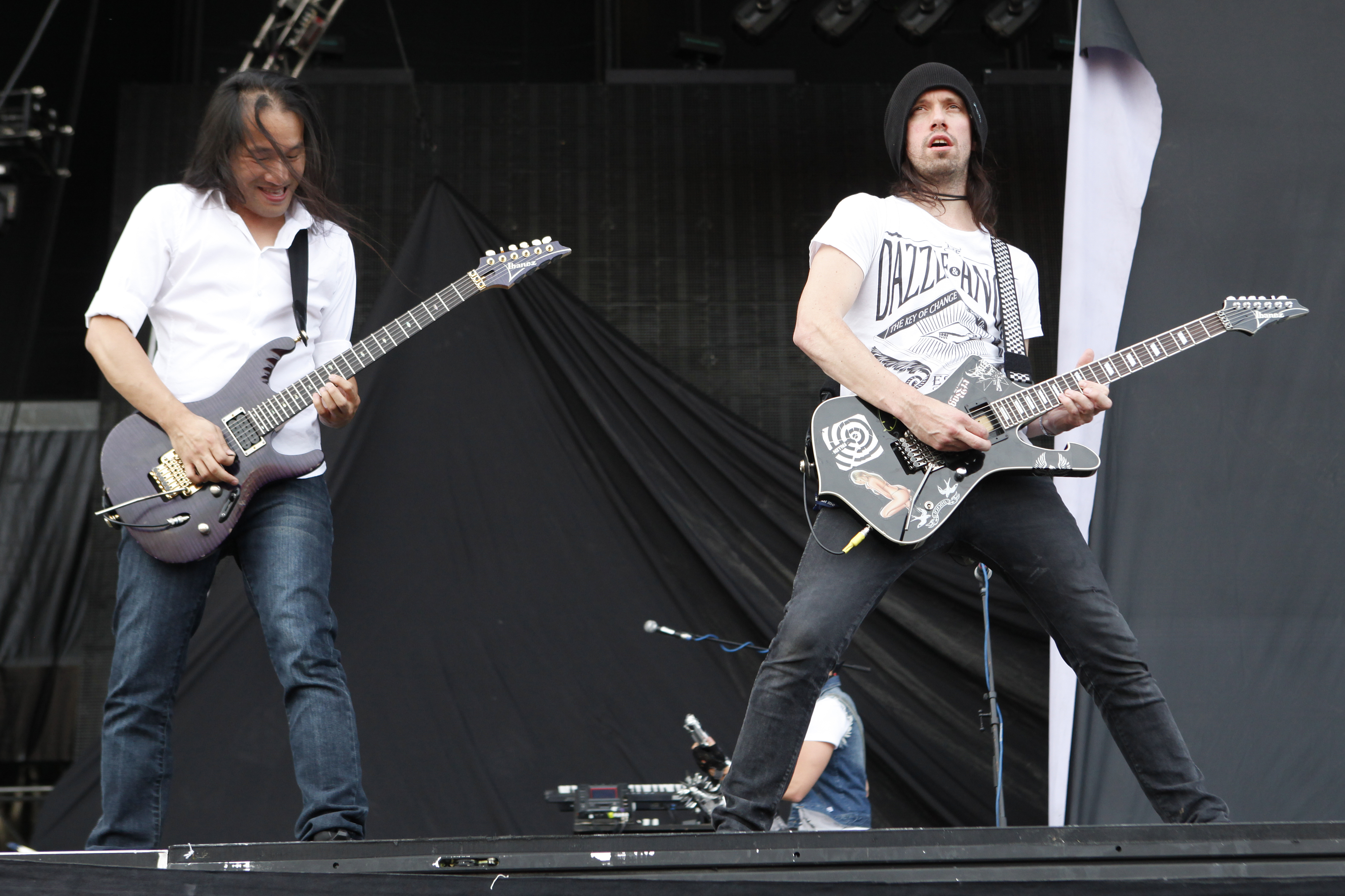
"Road of Resistance" includes guest appearances by DragonForce guitarists Herman Li and Sam Totman.

The song would be used to mark the beginning of the band's lore, Metal Resistance Episode III, at the concert held on November 8, 2014 at O2 Brixton Academy in London, which was also the final tour date for the band's Babymetal World Tour 2014.

A trailer for the song was released on January 5, 2015, integrating footage from the debut performance of the song in London. The song was first released as a digital bonus track off the live album Live at Budokan: Red Night, with limited editions of the album containing a download card with a code to download the song at no additional charge. The song was later released as a dedicated digital single on the iTunes Store on February 1, 2015.

Li and Totman are featured on guitars, although they are listed as featured artists in various regions of the re-release of the album Babymetal, on which the song appears as a bonus track, mainly in the United Kingdom.

== Composition ==
Rolling Stone described the song as "power metal" with "shiny pop harmonies". Rock Sound called the song "everything we’d expect from [Babymetal] with a bit of Dragonforce’s exhilarating, flame-fingered guitar added in for good measure." Matt Evans of The List called the song an "empowering hyperspeed anthem". According to Kadokawa, the song consists of twin shred guitars courtesy of Li and Totman, with a dynamic sound derived of melodic speed metal. The lyrics are described as a narrative on the Metal Resistance, which the band adopted on their world tour. It has also been considered the "final stage" of Babymetal and the prologue to Metal Resistance, and a transition performance that demonstrates the band's growth from the previous album.

According to Su-metal, the song refers to the Metal Resistance lore, described as "the story of Babymetal traveling across the world in the hopes of creating a new metal to unify the world as we break through the barriers of language and borders. In the middle of the song there is a part where we go, ‘Wow, Wow’ and this is where our fans from around the world can sing with us at our concerts. I hope people will listen to our album and support us at our shows." Yuimetal stated in an interview with Metal Hammer that "Road of Resistance" is her favorite song from Metal Resistance, explaining that it "has been performed at so many concerts, so a lot of memories are jam-packed. The lyrics are positive, the sound is so cool, and [the] dance is so powerful."

== Reception ==
"Road of Resistance" received generally favorable reviews from music critics, with most praise of the collaborative work between DragonForce and the band. Preston Phro of RocketNews24 called the song a "great start to the album", with the guitars played by DragonForce giving the song a "fun, over-the-top feel". Adrian Peel of Digital Journal called the opening track "manic, yet surprisingly tuneful". It received numerous accolades, including being named Best Metal Song of 2015 at the 2015 Loudwire Music Awards.

The song charted at number 22 on the Billboard World Digital Songs chart for the week of February 21, 2015.

== Live performances ==
"Road of Resistance" premiered at a concert as part of the band's Back to the USA / UK Tour 2014 at O2 Academy, Brixton. The song was unofficially dubbed "The One", after the final lines of narration preceding the performance. However, that title would later be used for another song on the band's second album.

The song was later performed at the encore of the show Legend "2015" New Year Fox Festival on January 10, 2015. The performance was later uploaded to YouTube on May 6, 2015.

== Track listing ==
Digital download

- "Road of Resistance" – 5:19

== Credits and personnel ==
Recording and management

- Recorded by Watametal and Adrian Breakspear
- Mixed by Ettore Rigotti

Personnel

- Suzuka Nakamoto (Su-metal) – vocals
- Yui Mizuno (Yuimetal) – vocals
- Moa Kikuchi (Moametal) – vocals
- Key Kobayashi (Kobametal / Kxbxmetal / Kitsune of Metal God) – executive producer, lyrics
- Miki Watanabe (Mk-metal) – lyrics
- Norikazu Nakayama (Norimetal) – music
- Nobuaki Miyasaka (Mish-Mosh) – music, arrangement
- Sari Miyasaka (Mish-Mosh) – music, arrangement
- Keiji Kusama (Kyt-metal) – music
- Kyoto – arrangement
- Leda – bass
- Herman Li – guitar (courtesy of Electric Generation Recordings Ltd. and Warner Music Japan Inc.)
- Sam Totman – guitar (courtesy of Electric Generation Recordings Ltd. and Warner Music Japan Inc.)

Credits adapted from Metal Resistance liner notes and Google Play.

== Charts ==
Chart (2015)	Peak position
US World Digital Songs (Billboard)	22

== Release history ==
Region	Date	Format	Label
Worldwide	February 1, 2015	Digital download	BMD Fox Records; Toy's Factory
