= Headbangeeeeerrrrr!!!!! =

- Standard edition cover

Single by Babymetal

from the album Babymetal and Sakura Gakuin 2012 Nendo: My Generation
- Language: Japanese
- B-side: "Uki Uki ★ Midnight"
- Released: July 4, 2012
- Genre: Melodic black rock
- Length: 4:03
- Label: Juonbu
- Songwriters: Edometal; Nakametal; Narasaki
- Producers: Kobametal; Narametal (arrangement)

Babymetal singles chronology
"Babymetal / Kiba of Akiba" (2012)	"Headbangeeeeerrrrr!!!!!" (2012)	"Ijime, Dame, Zettai" (2013)

Music video
- "Headbangeeeeerrrrr!!!!!" on YouTube

"Headbangeeeeerrrrr!!!!!" (ヘドバンギャー！！, Hedobangyā!!) is a single by the Japanese heavy metal band Babymetal. Released in Japan on July 4, 2012 in promotion for the album Sakura Gakuin 2012 Nendo: My Generation, the single serves as the third single from the debut album Babymetal. It is also the band's first solo audio release to be released commercially.

== Background and release ==
Unlike previous tracks released by the band, which had her vocal recorded in segments within the songs, Nakamoto had her lines recorded in a single take several times. She had been told to sing and find a story within the music. By the time she had comprehended the story behind the lyrics, she had grown capable of singing the entire song naturally. When Mizuno and Kikuchi listened to her shouting "Headbangeeeeerrrrr!!!!!" for the first time, they felt as if they had seen another cool side of her, surprised by the vocal power. Additionally, the single introduced the members to the whispering style of singing, with the A-side's "Kiero!" (Disappear!) and the B-side's "Uki Uki Midnight". Kobametal was inspired to use it to contrast traditional death growls.

"Headbangeeeeerrrrr!!!!!" was announced as a single on April 27, 2012, with a release date set for July 7, 2012. The single was released in two versions: a standard edition, available via CD and digital formats, and a physical limited Hedo-ban ("Head edition"), which contains a CD and a "neck corset" (actually a cervical collar) for headbanging training. Both editions of the single feature the songs "Headbangeeeeerrrrr!!!!!" and "Uki Uki ★ Midnight" (ウ・キ・ウ・キ★ミッドナイト; "Exhilarating Midnight"), along with instrumental versions (labeled as "Air Vocal ver."). The standard version contains an enhanced CD with a bonus music video of "Babymetal Death", which can only be played on a computer. The artwork of the standard edition depicts a lyric in the song, specifically when the girl is headbanging with the corset, with the crimson-colored moon in the background, as well as the band name appearing at the top. The limited edition artwork depicts a temple scripture of the "Corset of Legend" with the song title spelled out in the middle.

Before the physical international release of the song, its title was written ambiguously as either "Head Bangya!!" or "Headbangeeeeerrrrr!!!!!", the latter of which is officially used in the international re-release of Babymetal and all future releases. The music video uploaded to the band's YouTube channel initially had the former name, though it was switched to the latter in 2015; the version uploaded by Toy's Factory consistently retained the official title.

On January 5, 2026, a music video with a new version of the song has been released, with added vocals from Momometal.

== Composition ==
With music written and arranged by Coaltar of the Deepers member Narasaki, "Headbangeeeeerrrrr!!!!!" contains lyrics revolving around a girl on her fifteenth birthday, along with melancholy vocals, a backing track incorporating screams and double bass drums, finishing with an intense, emo-style melody. According to Nakamoto, the lyrics of the song did not initially have significance to her. After listener of the song explained how they had bought jū-hachi kippu tickets to see a concert far from home as stated in the song, she started to understand more of the theme.

The B-side, "Uki Uki ★ Midnight", has been described by Barks as a sequel to the song "Doki Doki ☆ Morning". Arranged by Yuyoyuppe, the song contains elements of metalcore and dubstep, along with segments of pop melodies and death growls. Notably, the bridge contains elements of the English lullaby "Twinkle, Twinkle, Little Star". Nakamoto described the lyrics, along with those of "Doki Doki ☆ Morning" as two parts of one peaceful day in the life of a teenage girl, although a connection was not discovered at first.

== Critical reception ==
Kazumi Nanba of Rolling Stone Japan said that the group gained popularity by relying much on its gimmicks, commenting on the song's combination of the "Vwoh!" death growls and the "cute chanting shouts".

== Music video ==
Directed by Hidenobu Tanabe (田辺秀伸), who would be named Best Director of that year (2012) at the Space Shower Music Video Awards, the music video was first released to the Toy's Factory YouTube channel on June 20, 2012. It narrated a story of a 15-year-old girl who found a legendary neck corset in a mysterious box that fell upon her from above. The box is visually similar to the cover of the limited edition of the single. All of a sudden, the corset jumps out of her hands, wraps around her neck and turns her into a "Headbangeeeeerrrrr!!!!!". According to Mizuno, the members of the band wore their heaviest makeup for the "Headbangeeeeerrrrr!!!!!" music video, while Kikuchi felt the fake eyelashes used were pulling down on her eyelids.

A video was not released for "Uki Uki ★ Midnight" with the availability of the single, though Kikuchi initially desired one, with a scene of eating squid arms, analogous to the line "Squid arms, squid arms, I want to eat squid arms". In 2013, a music video was released as part of a bonus DVD for the limited "Z" edition of the single Ijime, Dame, Zettai. The video features the live performance of the song from Legend: Corset Festival on July 21, 2012, interspersed with behind-the-scenes footage of the band members and close-ups of the three members singing the lines of the song.

== Tekina remix ==
During the live performances Legend "D" Su-metal Seitansai at Akasaka Blitz on December 20, 2012, and Legend "1997" Su-metal Seitansai at Makuhari Messe on December 21, 2012, a remix titled "Night of 15 mix." was performed, containing more elements of electronic music. The former took place on Suzuka Nakamoto's actual fifteenth birthday, while the latter was the opening song for the concert. Remixed by DJ'Tekina//Something, the song was later released as part of Social Reform promotional editions of the single "Ijime, Dame, Zettai", and later appeared on DJ'Tekina//Something's remix album Kawa-EDM (2016), re-subtitled as "Tekina Remix".

== Live performances ==
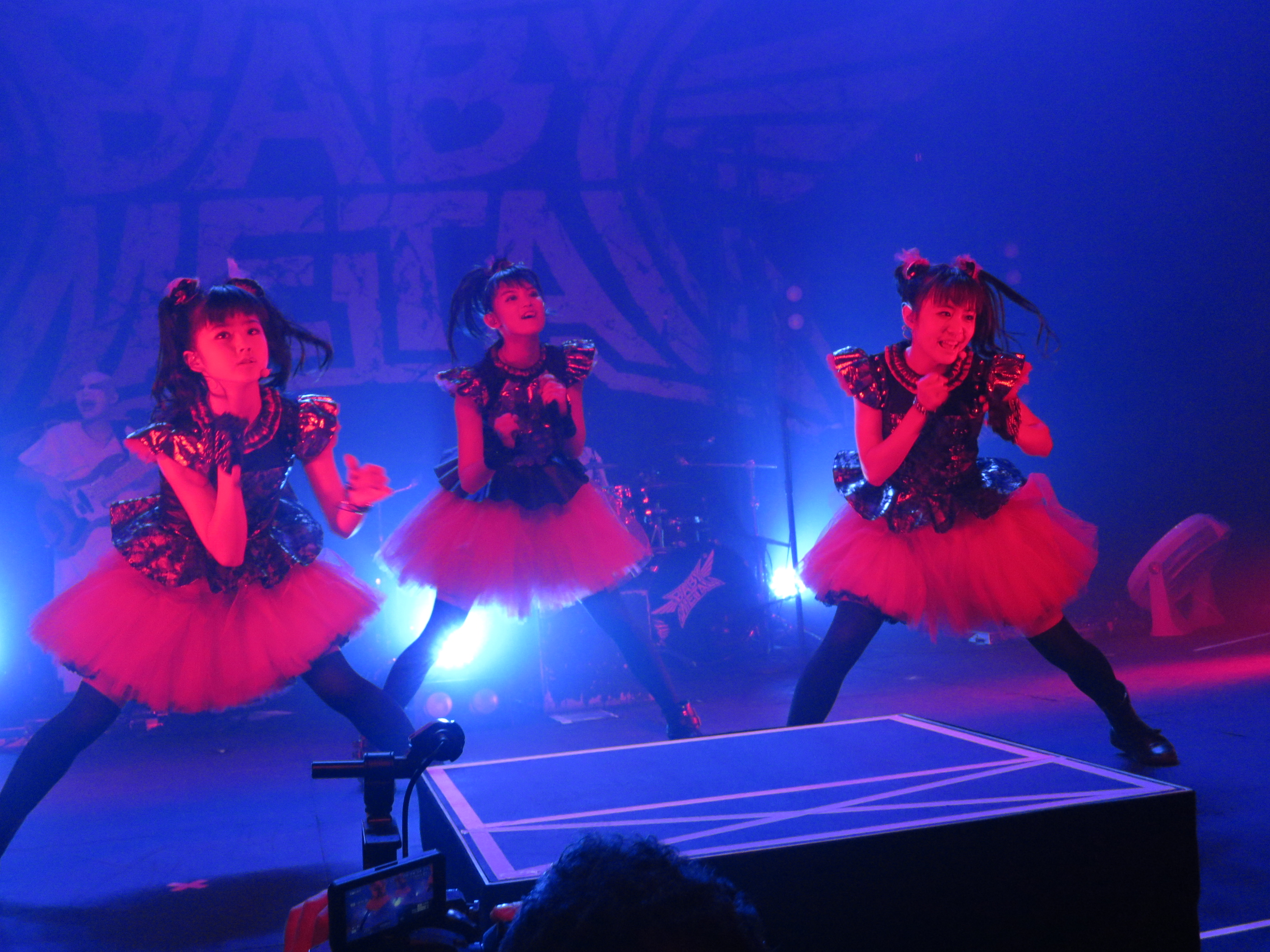
Babymetal performing "Uki Uki ★ Midnight" on the Babymetal World Tour 2014.

"Headbangeeeeerrrrr!!!!!" was first performed at the Pop'n Idol 02 venue at Zepp Tokyo on June 23, 2012. To promote the release of the single, the band performed the song during their promotional event "Headbang Pilgrimage!!" (ヘドバ行脚ー!!, Hedoba Angyā!!) at Tower Records/Tsuyata stores, first at Namba Rockets, Osaka on July 7, and at ell.Size, Nagoya on July 8. On July 14, the band performed in the concert Uki Uki ☆ Afternoon at Tower Records, Shibuya as a part of the Tower Records event No Music, No Idol?. The band also played the concert Legend: Corset Festival at Meguro Rock May Kan on July 21, 2012, where the song "Uki Uki ★ Midnight" was first performed live, and fans accepted into the concert were required to wear the corsets.

Yui Mizuno and Moa Kikuchi also performed some of the lead parts of "Headbangeeeeerrrrr!!!!!" for their fifteenth birthdays, although not on the exact days; Mizuno's performance was on July 1, 2014 at La Cigale in Paris and Kikuchi's was on July 3, 2014 at the Live Music Hall in Cologne, respectively, during the Babymetal World Tour 2014. In both instances, Su-metal ceremoniously handed over her microphone during the breakdown after the first chorus and then took over the singer's position in the choreography. In the Legend S: Baptism XX show at the Hiroshima Green Arena, which took place in the month of Nakamoto's twentieth birthday, most references to "fifteen" (一五, ichigo; literally "one-five") were replaced with "twenty years old" (二十歳, hatachi). Subsequently, Moa and eventual member Momoko have also commemorated their twentieth birthdays by performing the lead parts with the changed lyric.

Unlike in contemporary heavy metal performances, the members of the band dance to "Headbangeeeeerrrrr!!!!!" with a variation of headbanging called "baby headbanging", where the three lightly jump while swing their heads from shoulder to shoulder. A second variation known as "dogeza headbanging" involves kneeling and bowing deeply. Su-metal considered the unison of choreography for "Uki Uki ★ Midnight" to be difficult and strange, with elements of monster-like movements, falling asleep in the real world, and once more in a dream world.

== Track listing ==
No.	Title	Lyrics	Music	Arrangement	Length
1.	"Headbangeeeeerrrrr!!!!!" (ヘドバンギャー！！)	Edometal (江戸メタル); Nakametal (ナカメタル)	Narasaki	Narametal	4:03
2.	"Uki Uki ★ Midnight" (ウ・キ・ウ・キ★ミッドナイト)	Nakata Caos (中田カオス); Ryu-metal; Fuji-metal	Team-K	Yuyoyuppe	3:20
3.	"Headbangeeeeerrrrr!!!!!" (Air Vocal ver.)		Narasaki	Narametal	4:02
4.	"Uki Uki ★ Midnight" (Air Vocal ver.)		Team-K	Yuyoyuppe	3:19
Total length:					14:44

Notes

- The standard edition contains an enhanced CD with bonus footage, including a music video for the song "Babymetal Death".

== Credits and personnel ==
Recording and management

- Recorded and mixed at S.O.L.I.D. Sound Lab and Heartbeat Recording Studio
- Mastered at Parasight Mastering

Personnel

- Suzuka Nakamoto (SU-METAL) – lead vocals
- Yui Mizuno (YUIMETAL) – background vocals, additional lead vocals
- Moa Kikuchi (MOAMETAL) – background vocals, additional lead vocals
- Momoko Okazaki (MOMOMETAL) - additional background vocals in 15th Night version
- Millennium Japan (millennium JAPAN) – production
- Maxilla Inc. (maxilla inc.) – production
- Tucky – mastering
- Shion Hirota (江戸メタル) – lyrics
- Norikazu Nakayama (ナカメタル / 中田カオス) – lyrics
- Ryugi Yokoi (RYU-METAL) – lyrics
- Shinichi Fujita (FUJI-METAL) – lyrics
- Narasaki (NARASAKI) – music
- Shuhei Takahashi (TEAM-K) – music
- Kazuki Higashihara (TEAM-K) – music
- Narametal (NARAMETAL) – arrangement
- Takehiro Mamiya (ゆよゆっぺ / YUYOYUPPEMETAL) – arrangement, audio mixing, bonus video
- Seiji Toda – recording, audio mixing
- Machimetal (MACHIMETAL) – bonus video
- Johnmetal (JOHNMETAL) – bonus video
- Todametal (TODAMETAL) – bonus video
- Shumetal (SHUMETAL) – bonus video
- Tianmetal (TIANMETAL) – bonus video
- Shiometal (SHIOMETAL) – bonus video
- Mathieumetal (MATHIEUMETAL) – bonus video
- Rikometal (RIKOMETAL) – bonus video

== Charts ==
Chart (2012)	Peak position
Japan (Oricon)	20
Japan Hot Singles Sales (Billboard)	19

== Release history ==
Region	Date	Format	Label	Edition(s)	Ref.
Worldwide	July 4, 2012	Digital download	Toy's Factory	Standard	
Japan	July 4, 2012	Enhanced CD; digital download	Juonbu Records	Standard	
Japan	July 4, 2012	CD	Juonbu Records	Hedo-ban	
Japan	January 11, 2026	CD	Amuse, Inc.; BMW Fox Records	15th Night limited	
