= Gimme Chocolate!! =

"Gimme Chocolate!"

Single by Babymetal

from the album Babymetal
- Language: Japanese; English
- Released: May 31, 2015 (UK)
- Recorded: 2013
- Genre: J-pop; heavy metal; kawaii metal
- Length: 3:52
- Label: earMusic
- Composer: Takeshi Ueda
- Lyricists: Mk-metal; Kxbxmetal
- Producers: Kobametal; Ueda (arrangement)

Babymetal singles chronology
"Road of Resistance" (2015)	"Gimme Chocolate!" (2015)	"Karate" (2016)

Music video
- "Gimme Chocolate!!" on YouTube

"Gimme Chocolate!!" (ギミチョコ!!, Gimi Choko!!) is a song by the Japanese kawaii metal band Babymetal from their self-titled debut album. Though it was not released as a single in Japan, the song became an international success. Later, it was released via earMusic in the United Kingdom on May 31, 2015, as a digital single.

== Background and release ==
The song premiered on December 21, 2013, at the Makuhari Messe Event Hall, nearly coinciding with Nakamoto's sixteenth birthday. The song was first released in Japan as part of the band's debut album Babymetal on February 26, 2014, with a live music clip of the premiere uploaded to YouTube the day before, on February 25, 2014. The song was released in the United Kingdom as a digital single on iTunes on May 31, 2015, one day before the physical re-release of the album.

== Composition ==
"Gimme Chocolate!!" is composed and arranged by Takeshi Ueda of the Mad Capsule Markets. Described as a kawaii metal song, the band's manager Kobametal considered it closest to a pop crossover, like "Doki Doki ☆ Morning". The song begins with elements of thrash metal. During the verses, Mizuno and Kikuchi shout onomatopoeias such as "Atata tatata zukkyun!" (あたた たたた ずっきゅん!) while the chorus showcases the vocals of Nakamoto with a quick transition to pop melodies and a major key, with the phrases transitioning back and forth several times. The lyrics talk about girls struggling with the pressure to maintain their figures, or as Nakamoto explained, "[The lyrics of the song are] about girls and women who love to eat chocolate. But they are […] afraid about putting on weight."

== Reception ==
"Gimme Chocolate!" received generally positive reviews from music critics. Journalist Brian Mansfield of USA Today called it "a bizarre blend of death-metal, EDM rhythms and sugary J-pop melodies", as the song "begins with a speaker-shredding guitar assault that quickly gives way to machine-gun-rapid chirpy vocals and a chorus as addictive as chocolate-covered cereal and Saturday morning cartoons." In addition, Fuse listed the song as one of the nine most experimental girl group songs of all time, stating that "it's totally jaw dropping upon first listen. But you'll catch yourself humming along with the chorus soon enough."

In the United States, the song peaked at number five on the Billboard World Digital Songs chart. After the release of the band's second album Metal Resistance, in the week of May 14, 2016, the song charted at number 54 on the Billboard Japan Hot 100.

== Music video ==
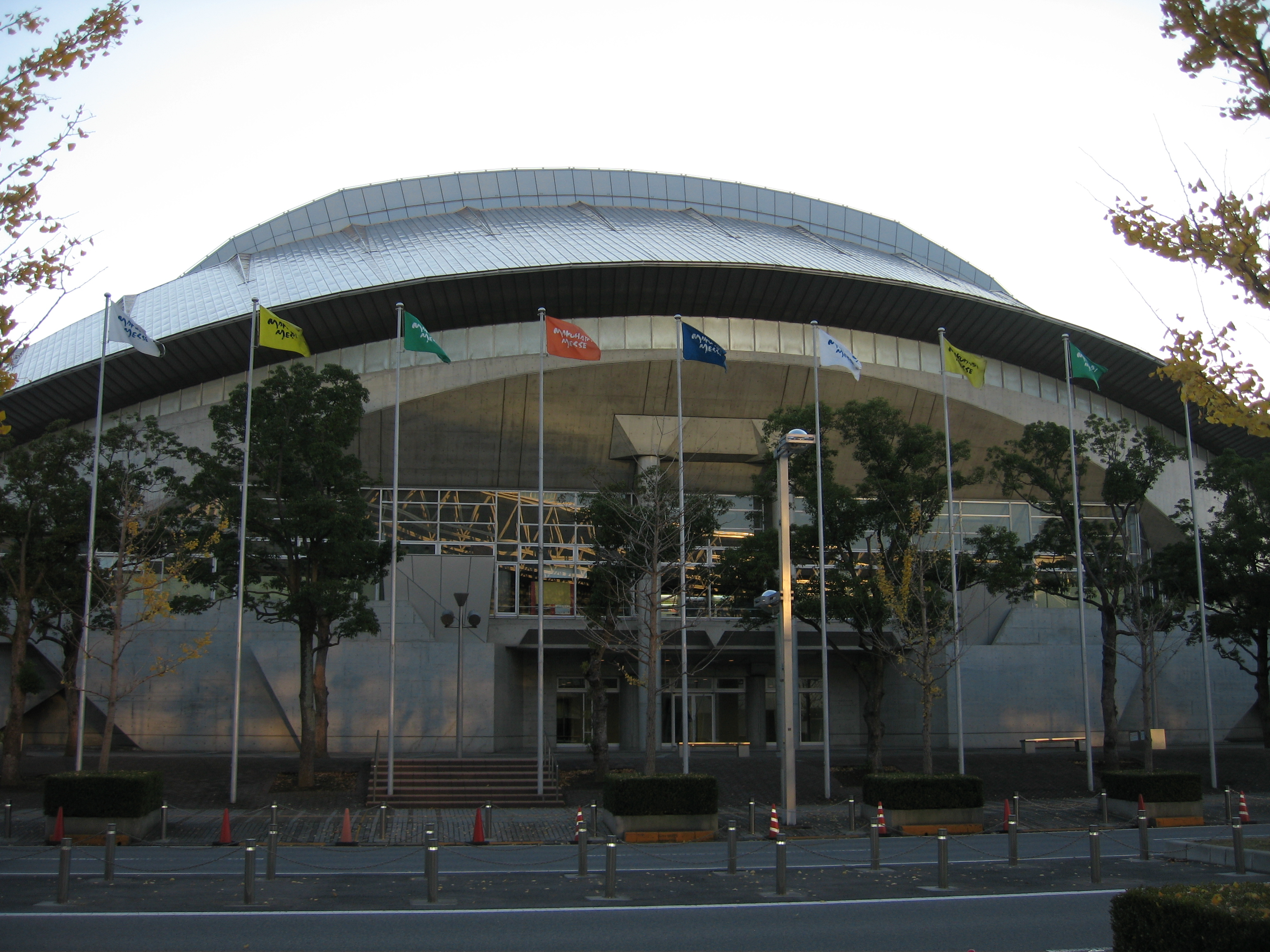
The music video for "Gimme Chocolate!!" was filmed at the Makuhari Messe Event Hall in December 2013.

Directed by Ryosuke Machida, the music video was filmed during the first live performance of the song at Makuhari Messe on December 21, 2013, as part of the concert Legend "1997" Su-metal Seitansai. The music clip was first teased on YouTube on February 3, 2014; the video was released in its entirety on the official YouTube channel, coinciding with the release of Babymetal (in Japanese time). The music video features the three Babymetal members dancing "super-cute choreography" in red and black outfits, backed by the mime band Babybones, performing in front of a crowd holding up the band's signature kitsune sign. The performance ends with "See you in the mosh'sh pit" overlaid on the screen. The video brought the band to global success, and has been featured in commercials for Chromecast in Japan. The video also appears in the limited editions of Babymetal in the DVD, along with music videos of other Babymetal songs.

== Live performances ==
After the release of their debut album, the band performed the song live regularly at venues, including the band's first world tour, the Babymetal World Tour 2014, and as an opening act for Lady Gaga's world tour ArtRave: The Artpop Ball. On June 12, 2015, the band made a surprise performance of the song, as well as "Road of Resistance" in collaboration with the band DragonForce at Download Festival. On September 20, 2015, the band performed a version of the song remixed by Skrillex at Ultra Japan. On April 5, 2016, Babymetal made their U.S. television debut, performing the song on The Late Show with Stephen Colbert.

== Track listing ==
Digital download

- "Gimme Chocolate!!" (ギミチョコ！！) – 3:52

== Credits and personnel ==
Credits are adapted from Babymetal album liner notes.

- Suzuka Nakamoto (SU-METAL) – vocals (lead)
- Yui Mizuno (YUIMETAL) – vocals (lead and background)
- Moa Kikuchi (MOAMETAL) – vocals (lead and background)
- Miki Watanabe (MK-METAL) – lyrics
- Key Kobayashi (KxBxMETAL) – lyrics
- Takeshi Ueda (TAKESHI UEDA) – music, arrangement

== Chart performance ==
Chart (2014–15)	Peak position
Japan Billboard Hot 100 (Billboard)	54
US World Digital Songs (Billboard)	5

== Cover versions ==
On August 10, 2017, Postmodern Jukebox released a jazz cover of the song, with vocals provided by Tara Louise. The group takes the "already offbeat combo of J-pop and heavy metal" and adds elements of retro jazz.

On October 9, 2017, Sakura Gakuin members Maaya Asō, Marin Hidaka, and Kano Fujihira covered the song as a "One-Night Shuffle Unit", wearing Babymetal T-shirts during the concert Sakura Gakuin 2017: After-School Anthology – Autumn Shuffle Night.

== Release history ==
Region	Date	Format	Label
United Kingdom	May 31, 2015	Digital download	earMusic
