= Live Music Hall =

Nightclub and venue in Ehrenfeld, Cologne, Germany

- LMH or Live
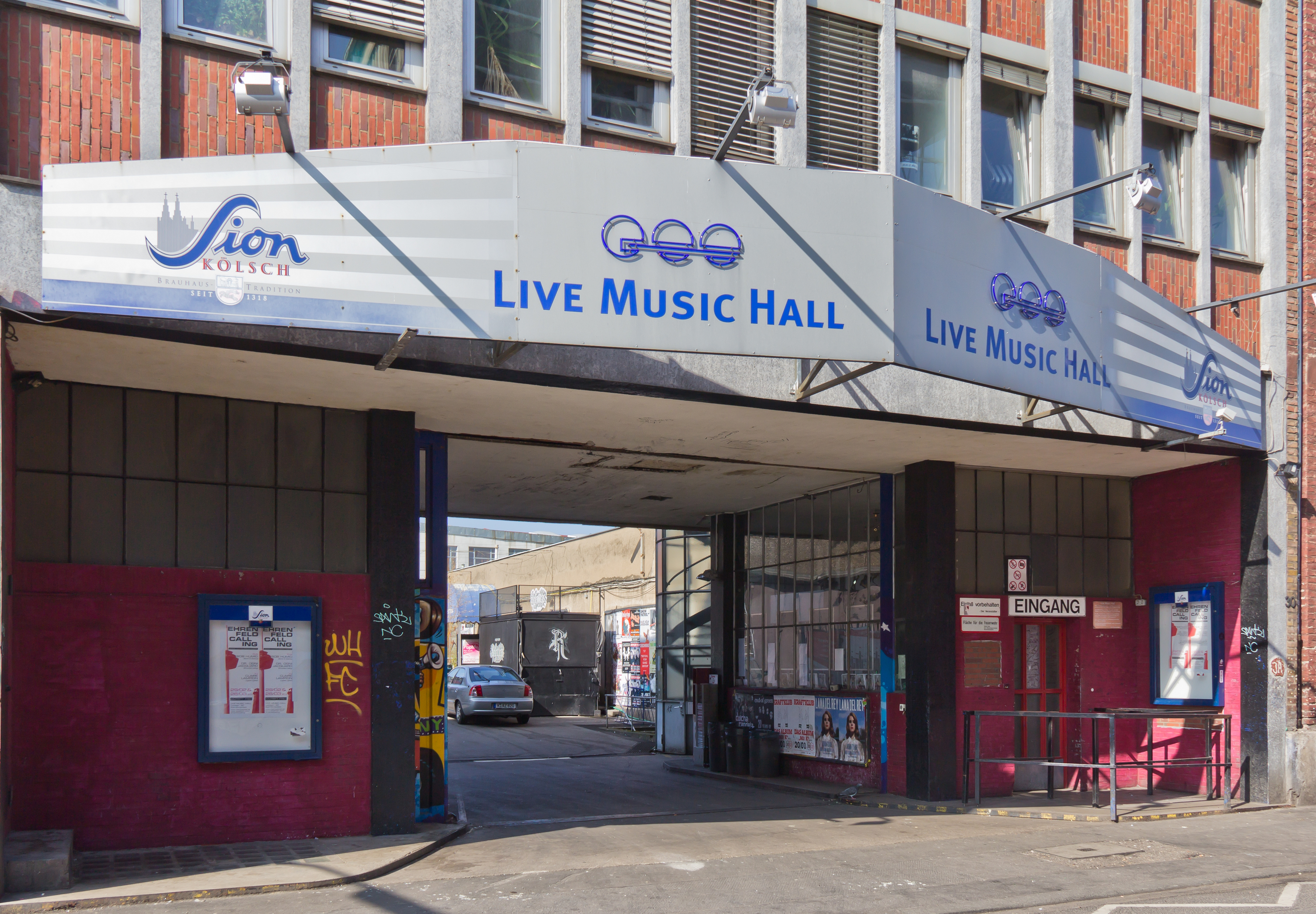
- Entrance to the grounds of the Live Music Hall
- Interactive map of Live Music Hall
- Location: Ehrenfeld, Cologne
- Coordinates: 50°56′57″N 6°54′36.4″E
- Seating type: General admission (standing)
- Capacity: 1,200-1,800
- Type: Nightclub

Live Music Hall (locally known as "LMH" or "Live") is a nightclub and music venue located in Ehrenfeld, Cologne, Germany.

== Concerts ==
Many famous artists have performed at the hall, including Duran Duran, Stand Atlantic, Pearl Jam, UFO, Kingdom Come, H-Blockx, Babymetal, Bushido, Chvrches, Death Cab for Cutie, Samy Deluxe, Elbow, Jeanette Biedermann, Troye Sivan, Melanie Martinez, Of Monsters and Men, Texas, Crowded House, Glenn Hughes, Porcupine Tree and Staind. Various concerts have been recorded for the TV show Rockpalast.
