= Ijime, Dame, Zettai =

- Standard edition cover

Single by Babymetal

from the album Babymetal
- Language: Japanese; English
- B-side: "Catch Me If You Can" (standard) "Babymetal Death" (limited)
- Released: January 9, 2013
- Genre: J-pop; speed metal; melodic death metal; power metal
- Length: 6:06
- Label: Toy's Factory; Amuse; Juonbu
- Composers: Kxbxmetal; Tsubometal; Takemetal
- Lyricists: Nakametal; Tsubometal
- Producers: Kobametal; Kyōtō (arrangement)

Babymetal singles chronology
"Headbangeeeeerrrrr!!!!!" (2012)	"Ijime, Dame, Zettai" (2013)	"Megitsune" (2013)

Music video
- "Ijime, Dame, Zettai" on YouTube

"Ijime, Dame, Zettai" (イジメ、ダメ、ゼッタイ; lit. "Bullying, No Good, Absolutely") is the debut major label single by Japanese heavy metal band Babymetal. It was released in Japan on January 9, 2013, as the fourth overall single from the album Babymetal.

== Background and release ==
The single was first announced after the concert Legend "I" at Shibuya O-East on October 6, 2012. An early version of the song can be heard in a video uploaded to the band's official YouTube channel entitled "Babymetal – My First Heavy Metal in Tokyo 2012", which also features part of a live performance of "Iine!". On November 8, 2012, an official trailer for the single and accompanying music was uploaded to the band's official YouTube channel. The trailers, along with a live performance at Sonisphere Festival, subtitled the song as "No More Bullying" and "No More, Bullying, Forever", respectively. An interview with the producers of the band was published in the December issue of Marquee to promote the single's release in January.

The single was released in four versions: a standard edition and three physical limited editions, "I", "D", and "Z". The DVDs included in the limited editions contain either footage of the music video for "Ijime, Dame, Zettai", or of a live performance by Babymetal. The single also had a promotional release to customers who purchased tickets to live performances of Legend "I", "D", or "Z".

Unlike previous singles released under Juonbu Records, no songs from the single appeared on a Sakura Gakuin album, due to "Headbangeeeeerrrrr!!!!!" having been already released the same school year.

== Composition ==
=== "Ijime, Dame, Zettai" ===
[In] the song "Ijime, Dame, Zettai," there is one phrase that means "I will protect you no matter what." I feel very connected to that because we play the song at the end of our set. All of us are super tired from the whole show, but there's one part in our choreography where we all walk to the center and look into each others' eyes and it's like, "OK, let's do this." It also reflects to where we are in reality. To me, it's a very, very important part of our show and that's why I like it.

— Nakamoto talking about her favorite lyrics from Babymetal.

"Ijime, Dame, Zettai" has a melodic speed metal sound, with lyrics pushing for the eradication of bullying; the song itself has been labeled as a "world reformation" metal song. The serious vocals of Suzuka Nakamoto, coupled with the more comical vocals of Yui Mizuno and Moa Kikuchi give the title track a more distinctive sound. The song is performed in the key of C♯ minor; the key shifts to F minor and G♯ minor in the bridge, finishing in E minor. According to Blabbermouth.net, the song "quickly created a buzz due to its mix of melodic speed metal, sensational lyrics around the theme of "Ijime" and the band's performance, which incorporates the "Wall of Death.""

According to the band's website, the "Nemesis" version of the song, which is found on limited editions of the single, features guitars recorded by former Arch Enemy guitarist Christopher Amott.

=== Other songs ===
Written by the same contributors as the band's previous single "Headbangeeeeerrrrr!!!!!", "Catch Me If You Can" contains elements of "digi-rock" (digital rock) and industrial metal, as well as a namahage-themed "death growl interlude", while the lyrics consist of a more comical theme of playing hide and seek. The song begins with footsteps; Mizuno admittedly expressed her fear of the ominous sounds, preferring to skip them when recording. The verse includes the three members speaking, although Nakamoto's lines were ultimately scrapped from the final track.

With arrangement by Yuyoyuppe, "Babymetal Death" begins with a symphonic intro, building up to a death metal number as voices shout out the phrase, letter by letter "Babymetal Death!!". The pun found in the name derives from the Japanese devoicing of the "/u/" sound, which is exploited in the word "death" (desu). As a result, the phrase can be read as "We are Babymetal" (Babymetal desu), which the band members used in the early years. Originally, the song in its original form released as a special feature from the "Headbangeeeeerrrrr!!!!!" single, was originally one second long, as a homage to the Napalm Death song "You Suffer", and was used as a final song to close performances for a while.

== Reception ==
Professional ratings
Review scores
Source	Rating
Rolling Stone Japan	4/5 stars

Kazumi Nanba of Rolling Stone Japan reviewed the title track, commenting that with accordance to the "eradication of bullying" in the title, the song is very straightforward and filled with a cute interjections, mentioning a balance between the seriousness and humor in the metal accompaniment, though it is excessively exquisite.

The single debuted at number six on the Oricon Weekly Singles Chart on the week of January 21, 2013, selling 19,000 copies in its first week of release. The song also managed to peak at number five on the Oricon Daily Singles Chart. The song also managed to top the Tower Records Singles Chart.

== Music video ==
The music video for "Ijime, Dame, Zettai", directed by Satoshi Kamiguchi, was teased on November 8, 2012; it was uploaded in its entirety to the official YouTube channel on November 27, 2012.

The concept of the video originated from the song title, depicting a world where metal music is persecuted, and followers of the genre are hunted down. To combat this, the three members are summoned to revitalize the spirit of metal, forming the concept known as the "Metal Resistance". The costumes worn in the video carry tones of red and black, as well as medieval armor styles in the image of Joan of Arc. During the bridge of the song, Mizuno and Kikuchi take the challenge of engaging in a "metal guitar battle" using guitars that were warped and damaged in earlier scenes.

A live performance of the song at the Sonisphere Festival in 2014 was uploaded to the channel on August 26, 2015.

== Live performances ==
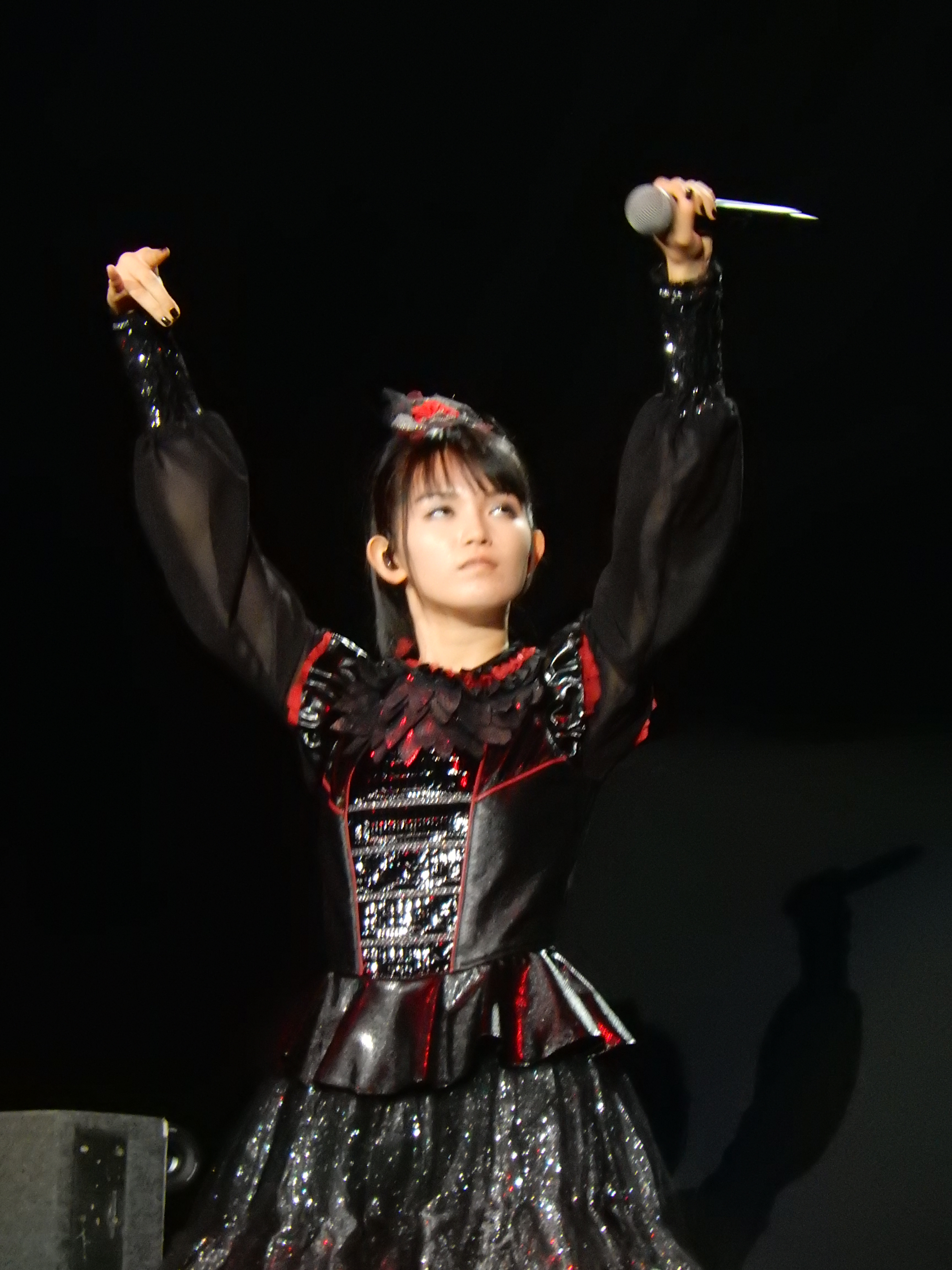
After Mizuno and Kikuchi leave the stage, Nakamoto performs "Ijime, Dame, Zettai" alone on stage until the commencement of the Wall of Death.

The song was premiered at the Sakura Gakuin concert Sakura Gakuin 2011 Nendo: New Departure at the Shibuya Duo Music Exchange on July 24, 2011. A month later, the song was performed at the annual Tokyo Idol Festival.

On November 21, 2012, the band performed the song on the Nippon Broadcasting System program MC Plus. In addition to collaborating with Tower Records for the 26th rendition of the event No Music, No Idol?, the band performed at several events, including the new year concert "One Song! Explosive Live!" at HMV Club Quattro in Shibuya on January 7, 2013, the Anime Festival Asia 2012 Show Screening at Tower Records in Shibuya on January 12, 2013, and the "Ijime, Dame, Zettai" in Osaka event on January 14, 2013.

On stage, the song begins with Mizuno and Kikuchi running across the stage from opposite ends, cueing the audience to mosh via the Wall of Death, which is different from the traditional manner. During the chorus, the three members jump and cross their arms into an "X", while shouting "Dame!" (No!) with their hands as kitsune signs. During the bridge of "Ijime, Dame, Zettai", Mizuno and Kikuchi choreograph a fight while Nakamoto and the crowd cheer on them with the sense of unity. Overall, the live performances has inspiration from those of the band X Japan.

"Babymetal Death" is often used as an opening track, mainly to excite the audience. The choreography consists of a conglomerate of dance moves from other songs in the band's repertoire. During the concert Legend "Z", the three members wore white robes for the encore, performing the song as well as and "Ijime, Dame, Zettai". A curtain was raised to obscure the stage beforehand, with lights from backstage projecting shadows of the members onto the sheet until the band resumed performance.

== Track listings and formats ==
Standard edition
No.	Title	Lyrics	Music	Arrangement	Length
1.	"Ijime, Dame, Zettai" (イジメ、ダメ、ゼッタイ)	Nakametal; Tsubometal	Kxbxmetal; Tsubometal; Takemetal	Kyoto (教頭)	6:06
2.	"Catch Me If You Can"	Edometal	Narasaki	Narametal	3:57
3.	"Ijime, Dame, Zettai" (Air Vocal ver.)		Kxbxmetal; Tsubometal; Takemetal	Kyoto	6:06
4.	"Catch Me If You Can" (Air Vocal ver.)		Narasaki	Narametal	3:57
Total length:					20:06

"I", "D", and "Z" limited edition CD
No.	Title	Lyrics	Music	Arrangement	Length
1.	"Ijime, Dame, Zettai" (イジメ、ダメ、ゼッタイ)	Nakametal; Tsubometal	Kxbxmetal; Tsubometal; Takemetal	Kyoto	6:06
2.	"Babymetal Death"	Kitsune of Metal God	Kitsune of Metal God	Yuyoyuppe	5:48
3.	"Ijime, Dame, Zettai" (Nemesis ver.)	Nakametal; Tsubometal	Kxbxmetal; Tsubometal; Takemetal	Kyoto	6:06
Total length:					18:00

"I" edition DVD – Music video
No.	Title	Length
1.	"Ijime, Dame, Zettai" (music video)	6:10
2.	"Ijime, Dame, Zettai" (making video)	5:40
Total length:		11:50

"D" edition DVD – 2nd Idol Yokocho Festival!! Live Band Special 4/8/2012 at Shibuya-AX
No.	Title	Length
1.	"Doki Doki ☆ Morning" (ド・キ・ド・キ☆モーニング)	3:45
2.	"Iine!" (いいね！)	4:10
Total length:		7:55

"Z" edition DVD – Legend "Corset Festival" 7/21/2012 at Rock May Kan
No.	Title	Length
1.	"Headbangeeeeerrrrr!!!!!" (ヘドバンギャー！！)	4:02
2.	"Uki Uki ★ Midnight" (ウ・キ・ウ・キ★ミッドナイト)	3:20
Total length:		7:22

World Reformation promotional edition – Su-metal, Yuimetal, and Moametal edition CD
No.	Title	Remixer	Length
1.	"Ijime, Dame, Zettai" (イジメ、ダメ、ゼッタイ)		6:06
2.	"Headbangeeeeerrrrr!!!!!" (Night of 15 Mix) (ヘドバンギャー！！ -Night of 15 mix-)	DJ'Tekina//Something	4:29
Total length:			10:38

== Credits and personnel ==
Credits adapted from "Ijime, Dame, Zettai" standard and limited "I" single liner notes.

Recording and management

- Recorded at MukuStudio, Sound Arts Studio, S.O.L.I.D. Sound Lab, and Wacken Open Studio
- Mixed at Art Pop Entertainment, Hama Shobo Studio (濱書房スタジオ), S.O.L.I.D. Sound Lab, and Heartbeat Recording Studio
- Mastered at Parasight Mastering

Personnel

- Suzuka Nakamoto (SU-METAL) – vocals (lead and background)
- Yui Mizuno (YUIMETAL) – vocals (lead and background)
- Moa Kikuchi (MOAMETAL) – vocals (lead and background)
- Key Kobayashi (Kobametal / KxBxMETAL / KITSUNE of METAL GOD) – executive producer, lyrics, music
- Millennium Japan (millennium JAPAN) – executive producer
- Tucky – mastering
- Christopher Amott – guitar
- Norikazu Nakayama (NAKAMETAL) – lyrics
- Tatsuya Tsubono (TSUBOMETAL) – lyrics, music
- Shion Hirota (EDOMETAL) – lyrics
- Takeru Youda (TAKEMETAL) – music
- Nobuki Narasaki (NARASAKI) – music
- Kyoto (教頭) – arrangement
- Narametal (NARAMETAL) – arrangement
- Takehiro Mamiya (Yuyoyuppe / DJ'TEKINA//SOMETHING) – arrangement, audio mixing
- Naoki Ibaraki – recording, audio mixing
- Taro Isomura – audio mixing
- Seiji Toda – recording, audio mixing
- Masahiro Tamoto – assistant
- Shinya Yamazaki – assistant

== Charts ==
=== Weekly charts ===
Chart (2013)	Peak position
Japan (Oricon)	6
Japan (Billboard)	14
Japan Hot Top Airplay (Billboard)	46
Japan Hot Singles Sales (Billboard)	5

=== Daily charts ===
Chart (2013)	Peak position
Japan (Oricon)	5

== Release history ==
Region	Date	Format	Label	Edition(s)
Japan	January 9, 2013	CD, digital download	Toy's Factory; Amuse, Inc.; Juonbu Records	Standard
Japan	January 9, 2013	CD	Toy's Factory; Amuse, Inc.; Juonbu Records	"I", "D", and "Z" limited
Worldwide	January 9, 2013	Digital download	Toy's Factory	Standard
