= Yuyoyuppe =

- Also known as: DJ'Tekina//Something; DJ'Tekina//Something a.k.a. Yuyoyuppe; Yuppemetal
- Born: Takehiro Mamiya; September 25, 1989 (age 37)
- Origin: Ōarai, Ibaraki Prefecture, Japan
- Genres: J-pop; heavy metal; metalcore; alternative rock; post hardcore; hard rock; dubstep
- Occupations: DJ; songwriter; producer; singer
- Years active: 2008–present
- Labels: Vocaloid; Yamaha Music

Takehiro Mamiya (間宮丈裕, Mamiya Takehiro; born September 25, 1989), known professionally as Yuyoyuppe (ゆよゆっぺ), is a Japanese DJ, songwriter, producer, and singer, known for his Vocaloid music.

== Early life ==
Takehiro Mamiya was born on September 25, 1989, when his parents were expecting a baby girl. He first learned to play the guitar in the sixth grade, by his father. First playing on piano and guitar in junior high school, he began to write music for club activities, and later performed on guitar and vocals in a band since high school.

== Career ==
In 2008, Yuyoyuppe began to post videos on the video sharing service Nico Nico Douga, where he would become well known for his Vocaloid songs with elements of hard rock, with considerable success for his song "Hope", sung by Hatsune Miku. He would later join the band My Eggplant Died Yesterday as a vocalist.

On September 26, 2012, Yuyoyuppe released his debut album Story of Hope, as his first release on the label Yamaha Music which he joined that year. On January 16, 2013, he released the album Wall in the Presence: Yuppemism Edition to the iTunes Store. On July 16, 2014, he released the album Vocaloholic, and later that month, he left My Eggplant Died Yesterday to form a new band called Grilled Meat Youngmans. In May 2016, he released the album Kawa-EDM under DJ'Tekina//Something. In October 2016, he released the album Yutori Dakara Honki ni Narenai. In September 2019, Grilled Meat Youngmans announced that they were changing their name to Naked Identity Created by King. In August 2025, he released a song with neko titled "Cut it deep" digitally.

Yuyoyuppe has produced music for other artists, such as Babymetal, for their debut album Babymetal. He has since written music for the band, including the song "Karate" from Metal Resistance. Finding appeal in the band's music, he was approached by the band's manager Kobametal to write a song, to which he obliged.

Mamiya also performs as a DJ under the stage name DJ'Tekina//Something, having performed at the Rock in Japan Festival and Summer Sonic Festival.

He is married to voice actress Hibiku Yamamura, who announced their marriage on Twitter on November 3rd, 2023.

== Musical style ==
His music follows the genres of rock and metal.

Mamiya has expressed that although he has solid scheduling and deadlines, he follows his instincts while working, which loosens his fixation on them. He has also stated that distributing his music digitally allows for audiences abroad to discover his work.

== Discography ==
=== As Yuyoyuppe ===
Title	Album details
Story of Hope	Released: September 26, 2012; Label: Yamaha Music Communications; Formats: CD, DVD, digital download
Wall in the presence -Yuppeism edition-	Released: January 16, 2013; Label: Loid; Format: Digital download
Vocaloholic (ぼかろほりっく)	Released: July 16, 2014; Label: Victor Entertainment; Formats: CD, digital download
Yutori Dakara Honki ni Narenai (ゆとりだから本気になれない)	Released: October 26, 2016; Label: Tokyo Logic, Yamaha Music Communications; Formats: CD, digital download

=== As DJ'Tekina//Something ===
Title	Album details
DJ'Tekina//Something	Released: April 28, 2014; Label: Motoloid; Format: CD, digital download
Kawa-EDM	Released: May 25, 2016; Label: Avex Japan; Formats: CD
RED	Released: April 29, 2018; Label: Motoloid; Format: CD, digital download
BLUE	Released: April 29, 2018; Label: Motoloid; Format: CD, digital download

=== As Draw the Emotional ===
Title	Album details
Solitude freak	Released: September 6, 2009; Label: Draw the Emotional; Format: CD
DEAR	Released: November 15, 2009; Label: Draw the Emotional; Formats: CD
For a sick boy	Released: February 7, 2010; Label: Draw the Emotional; Formats: CD
I'm	Released: May 9, 2010; Label: Draw the Emotional; Formats: CD
Collapse of the sky	Released: August 14, 2010; Label: Draw the Emotional; Formats: CD
Wall in the presence. (old)	Released: October 20, 2010; Label: Draw the Emotional; Formats: Digital download
Planetary suicide	Released: January 16, 2011; Label: Draw the Emotional; Formats: CD
Draw the Emotional x AVTechNO!	Released: February 23, 2011; Label: Karent; Formats: Digital download
Funny party in the Fog	Released: March 13, 2011; Label: Draw the Emotional; Formats: CD
Wall in the presence. (new)	Released: November 23, 2011; Label: Draw the Emotional; Formats: CD
Ghost and your heart	Released: December 30, 2011; Label: Draw the Emotional; Formats: CD
YUYOYU EP	Released: August 11, 2012; Label: Draw the Emotional; Formats: CD
Seated With Liquor	Released: December 30, 2012; Label: Draw the Emotional & Foreground Eclipse; Formats: CD
Inverted mind	Released: August 16, 2014; Label: Draw the Emotional; Formats: CD
Draw	Released: December 30, 2018; Label: Draw the Emotional; Formats: CD

=== With Naked Identity Created by King ===
==== Albums ====
Title	Album details
EATMANS	Released: September 28, 2016; Label: Motoloid; Format: CD
Naked Identity Created by King	Released: November 13, 2019; Label: Naked Identity Created by King; Format: CD
BAD TRIP	Released: July 9, 2022; Label: Naked Identity Created by King; Formats: CD
Vivid Candy	Released: April 18, 2023; Label: Naked Identity Created by King
ALTERN∀TE	Released: April 20, 2025; Label: Naked Identity Created by King
VIRTUAL MISS∀	Released: March 25, 2026; Label: Naked Identity Created by King

==== Singles ====
Title	Year	Album
"Curry On"	2017	Non-album single
"Enemy"	2020	Non-album single
"Seed"	2020	BAD TRIP
"Sweet ∀iolence"	2024	ALTERN∀TE
"Dead Meme D∀ncer"	2025	Non-album single
"Never Min:D"	2026	Non-album single

=== Productions ===
Babymetal – Babymetal (2014)

- "Babymetal Death"
- "Megitsune"
- "Uki Uki ★ Midnight"
- "Rondo of Nightmare" (also lyricist and composer)

Momoiro Clover Z – Hakkin no Yoake (2016)

- ""Z" no Chikai"

Babymetal – Metal Resistance (2016)

- "Karate" (arranged as Yuppemetal; also lyricist and composer)
- "Yava!" (arranged as Yuppemetal)
- "From Dusk Till Dawn" (arranged as Yuppemetal; also composer)
- "GJ!" (arranged as Yuppemetal; also lyricist and composer)
- "Sis. Anger" (arranged as Yuppemetal)

Babymetal – Metal Galaxy (2019)

- "↑↓←→BBAB" (arranged as Yuppemetal)
- "Night Night Burn!" (arranged as Yuppemetal)
- "In the Name Of" (arranged as Yuppemetal)
- "Kagerou" (arranged as Yuppemetal; also composer)

Tokoyami Towa – Aster (2023)

- "ANEMONE"

Babymetal – The Other One (2023)

- "Monochrome" (arranged as Yuppemetal; also composer)
- "Believing" (arranged as Yuppemetal; also composer)

=== Remixes ===
As DJ'Tekina//Something

- Babymetal – "Headbangeeeeerrrrr!!!!!" (Night of 15 mix) (2013; from Kawa-EDM)
- Babymetal – "Megitsune" (Tekina Remix) (2013)
