= Kobametal =

Japanese music producer

Key Kobayashi (小林啓, Kobayashi Kei), better known by his pseudonym Kobametal, is a Japanese music producer under the talent agency Amuse, Inc. Kobayashi is also the CEO of Babymetal World LLC.

He is best known as the producer and manager of the kawaii metal group Babymetal.

== Biography ==
Kobayashi's interest in heavy metal music started around his sixth grade in elementary school after listening to the band Seikima-II. He joined Amuse in 1996 and spent the early years of his career doing media promotion for visual kei bands such as Siam Shade and Cascade.

On March 14, 2009, he accompanied Mini-Pati, a patissier-themed girl group formed by Amuse in cooperation with the Japanese Ministry of Agriculture, Forestry and Fisheries, in their appearance at the farewell concert of Karen Girl's, of which Suzuka Nakamoto was a member. After watching Nakamoto's performance, Kobayashi planned to launch a new musical unit combining J-pop and heavy metal with her as the lead singer. Future Babymetal member Yui Mizuno was also present at the concert.

In 2010, the idol group Sakura Gakuin was formed by Amuse with a theme of school life and club activities. One of the sub-units formed within the group was the Heavy Music Club, produced by Kobayashi, and Mini-Pati was also absorbed as the Cooking Club sub-unit. In February 2011, Amuse announced that the members of Heavy Music Club, namely Nakamoto, Mizuno, and Moa Kikuchi, would perform under the name Babymetal.

On March 13, 2016, he received an Excellence Award from the Association of Media in Digital (AMD) in Japan for his success in promoting Babymetal internationally.

In June 2022, Kobametal was appointed as a director of Kulture, Inc, an Amuse subsidiary which would handle the integration of new technologies such as the metaverse and NFT into the entertainment industry.

In April 2025, Kobametal was appointed as the CEO of Babymetal World LLC, a company established by Amuse in United States to expand Babymetal global activities.
