= List of Babymetal live performances =

Babymetal live performances
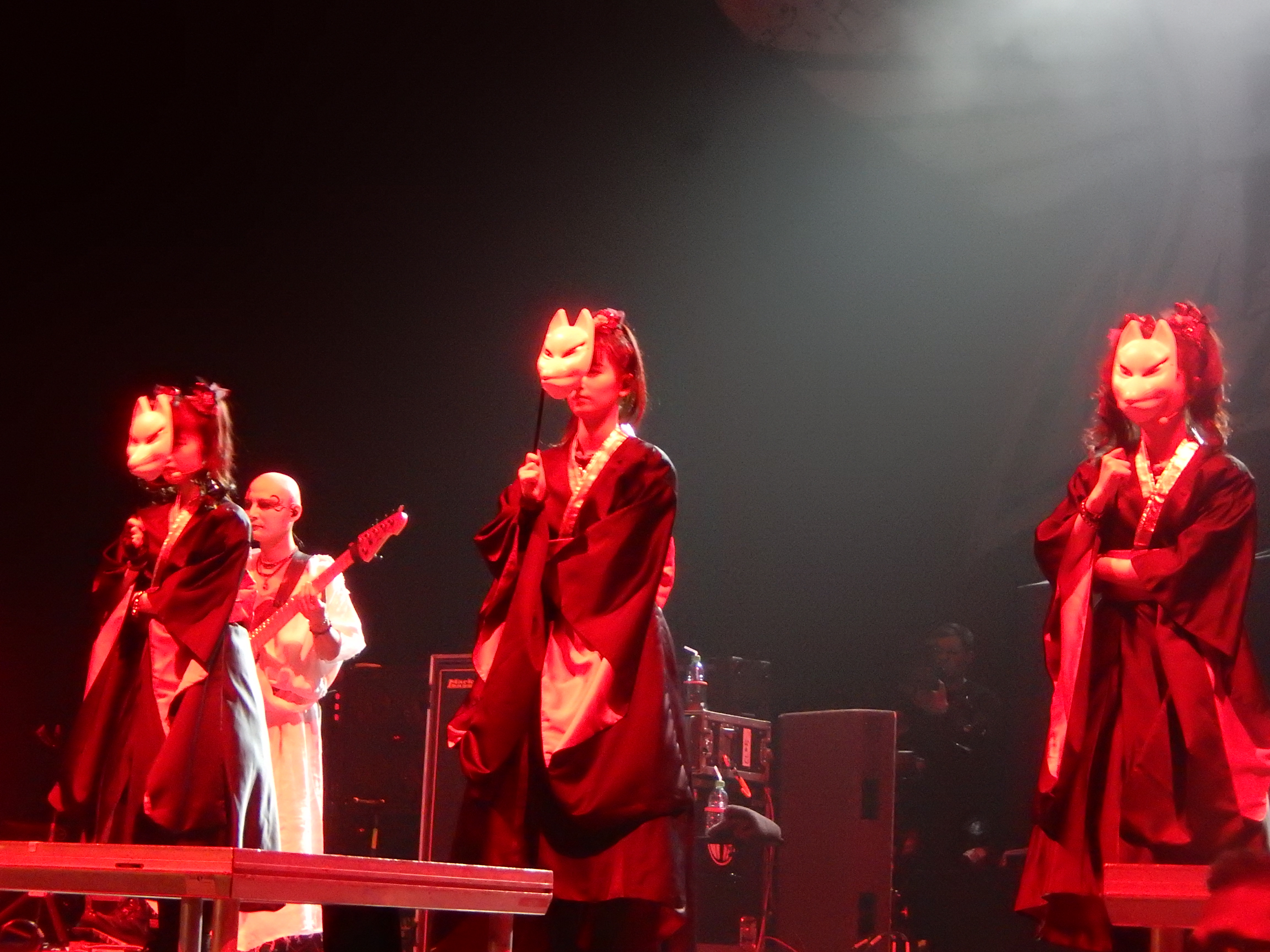
- Babymetal performing as an opening act during the Getaway World Tour (2016)
- Concert tours: 7
- Promotional concerts: 1
- One-off headlining shows: 8
- Festival concerts: 27
- Sakura Gakuin shows: 13
- Award shows: 2
- Television shows and specials: 11
- Other shows: 16

Japanese band Babymetal has embarked on five headlining tours, in addition to performing at various other one-off shows, award ceremonies, and television shows. Babymetal originated as a sub-unit of the Japanese idol group Sakura Gakuin in 2010, and first promoted their first singles as part of the group at their various concerts in Japan. For the first three years, the band performed as a sub-unit of the main group called jūon-bu (heavy music club).

Many of the band's performances are connected together within the band's lore, called the Metal Resistance. In 2012 and 2013, the band performed in a series of shows, accompanying the release of their major label singles "Ijime, Dame, Zettai" and "Megitsune". Following the release of their debut album Babymetal in 2014, as well as their viral success from their music videos, especially of the song "Gimme Chocolate!!", the band began their first headlining tour, the Babymetal World Tour 2014, which began in April 2014 and ended in December 2014, with performances in Europe, North America, and Japan. The following year, the band headlined another one-off show in Saitama, Japan and embarked on their second world tour, the Babymetal World Tour 2015, coinciding with the band's rerelease of Babymetal (2014) internationally.

To promote the band's second studio album Metal Resistance (2016), Babymetal began the Babymetal World Tour 2016: Legend Metal Resistance, which began with a headlining show at the Wembley Arena in April 2016 and ended with two shows at the Tokyo Dome in September 2016. Critics praised the vocal performance of the singers, as well as the instrumental performance of the supporting Kami Band. Following the conclusion of the show, the band toured around the United States, serving as an opening act for the bands Red Hot Chili Peppers, Metallica, Guns N' Roses, Korn, and Stone Sour from December 2016 to June 2017. Afterward, the band returned to Japan and performed a series of shows in The Five Fox Festival in Japan tour, and finishing the year with a pair of headlining shows in Hiroshima to commemorate the twentieth birthday of lead singer Suzuka Nakamoto. Yui Mizuno did not perform from that show onwards, and with Babymetal embarking on their Babymetal World Tour 2018 in May 2018, she eventually left the group officially.

== Concert tours ==
Year	Title	Duration	Shows
2014	Babymetal World Tour 2014	June 23, 2014 – December 20, 2014 (Worldwide)	17
The Babymetal World Tour 2014, the band's debut headlining tour, promoted the band's debut album Babymetal (2014), and represents the second episode of the band's lore, the Metal Resistance. The tour took place in Europe, North America, and Japan. The band made various appearance made at music festivals, and some shows made to commemorate the birthdays of the three members. The band also served as an opening act for Lady Gaga's tour ArtRave: The Artpop Ball in the United States. In August 2014, the band extended the tour with additional shows in the United States and the United Kingdom.
2015	Babymetal World Tour 2015	April 23, 2015 – December 13, 2015 (Worldwide)	35
The Babymetal World Tour 2015, the second worldwide tour by Babymetal, took place around the international rerelease of Babymetal, and represents the third episode of the Metal Resistance. According to Su-metal, the tour provided little time to prepare, and its goal was to "pave a new path", as the band's newly released song "Road of Resistance" had described. In June 2015, the band extended the tour with more dates set in Japan.
2016	Babymetal World Tour 2016: Legend Metal Resistance	April 2, 2016 – September 20, 2016 (Worldwide)	35
The Babymetal World Tour 2016: Legend Metal Resistance, the third worldwide tour by Babymetal, promoted the band's second album Metal Resistance (2016), and represented the fourth episode of the Metal Resistance. Beginning the day after the album's worldwide release date, the tour ended with two shows at Tokyo Dome. The goal of the tour was to grow as a band before returning to Japan, and to develop songs from the new album. Critics praised the tour for energy and vocal performance of the three members as well as the instrumental skill of the accompanying band.
2017	Babymetal US Tour 2017	June 16, 2017 – June 25, 2017 (United States)	7
After opening the bands Red Hot Chili Peppers, Metallica, and Guns N' Roses, Babymetal performed a headlining show in Los Angeles, California on June 16, 2017, with special guest Hellyeah, as part of the band's tour in the United States. The performance notably included the premiere of the international-exclusive track "From Dusk Till Dawn", and made gross sales of $170,200 alone. Afterwards, the band toured throughout the United States as an opening act for Korn and Stone Sour's The Serenity of Summer tour, beginning at Albuquerque, New Mexico, on June 18, 2017, and ending at Nampa, Idaho, on June 25, 2017.
2017	The Five Fox Festival in Japan and Big Fox Festival in Japan	July 18, 2017 – October 15, 2017 (Japan)	15
The Five Fox Festival in Japan was a headlining tour with dates exclusive to Japan, representing the fifth episode of the Metal Resistance. Ticket holders were required to follow a dress-code and pass age or gender restrictions to be allowed into the venue, which was controversial for international fans who won tickets randomly by lottery. In May 2017, the band extended the tour with another leg titled Big Fox Festival in Japan, in response to tickets selling out.
2018	Babymetal World Tour 2018	May 8, 2018 – December 9, 2018 (Worldwide)	22
The Babymetal World Tour 2018, the fourth worldwide tour by Babymetal, began in May 2018, and was scheduled to end in October 2018 with the final tour dates in Japan. The tour represents the seventh episode of the Metal Resistance, and a teaser posted online suggested the idea of "seven metal spirits" which would somehow appear throughout the tour. The band released "Distortion" as a surprise single before embarking on the tour, and performed several new songs, including "In the Name Of", "Elevator Girl", and "Kagerou". The band's performance at Rock on the Range on May 20, 2018, was streamed online via LiveXLive the same day. Yuimetal did not perform with the band on the tour, and left the band entirely in October 2018. Later, the band extended the tour with dates in Australia in December.
2019–2020	Metal Galaxy World Tour	September 4, 2019 – March 1, 2020 (Worldwide)	46
On May 10, 2019, Babymetal announced a series of shows in the United States, in conjunction with the release of the band's single "Elevator Girl". The tour included a headlining show at The Forum in Los Angeles, as well as an appearance at the Aftershock Festival in Sacramento. The band later announced tour dates in Europe and Japan, along with the title of the tour. The performance at The Forum on October 11, 2019, coincided with the release of the band's third album Metal Galaxy (2019). More tour dates were added in Asia and Europe, extending the tour to June 24, 2020, in Spain.
2023	Babymetal World Tour 2023	January 28, 2023 – March 24, 2024 (Worldwide)	71
On January 28 and 29, 2023, Babymetal played at Makuhari Messe, marking their first live concert in nearly two years. They played a total of 13 songs, five of which were from their album The Other One. On March 15, the band announced their first tour since 2019, the Babymetal World Tour 2023, where they will play in Asia and Australia. On April 1, 2023, during Babymetal's performance at Pia Arena MM in Kanagawa, Okazaki was officially announced as the new member of a "reborn Babymetal", adopting the stage name Momometal. In April 2023, Babymetal announced a tour in North America, in support of The Other One, with Dethklok and Jason Richardson from August to October 2023. They later announced a solo headlining European tour from November to December 2023. To end the tour, two concerts were held at the Yokohama Arena on March 2 and 3, 2024, under the title of Legend – MM, to celebrate the birthday of Momometal. The first night was titled 20 Night, as she was 20 years old at the time, and the second night was titled 21 Night, coinciding with her 21st birthday. Approximately 30,000 people were in attendance over the two days.
2025	Babymetal World Tour 2025	February 28, 2025 – August 2, 2025 (Worldwide)	45
On October 23, 2024 Babymetal announced a UK and European arena tour for 2025, with special guests Poppy and Bambie Thug. The upcoming tour is scheduled to visit arenas in Brussels, Amsterdam, Berlin, Zurich, Barcelona, Paris and other European cities throughout May. From there, Babymetal will head to the UK for a concert at The O2 in London on Friday May 30. On the March 18, 2025 Babymetal announced a North American summer 2025 headlining tour produced by Live Nation with support from Black Veil Brides and Jinjer on select dates, along with Bloodywood.

== Promotional concerts ==
Year	Title	Duration	Shows
2013	Babymetal Death Match Tour 2013: May Revolution	May 10, 2013 – May 18, 2013 (Japan)	4
To promote the release of the band's single "Megitsune", the band embarked on the Babymetal Death Match Tour 2013: May Revolution in May 2013. The tour has been described as a "training tour", accompanied with a backing band to play all the music. The band performed shows on May 10, May 17, and May 18, 2013. A trailer for the tour was published on April 1, 2013, depicting the tour as a legendary battle in the Metal Resistance, led by the Metal Master.

== Headlining shows ==
Shows that are performed during concert tours are not listed.

Year	Title	Duration	Shows
2012	Legend "Corset Festival"	July 21, 2012 (Tokyo)	1
Legend "Corset Festival", the first headlining show by Babymetal, promoted the release of the band's single "Headbangeeeeerrrrr!!!!!". The show took place at Rock May Kan, and attendees were required to wear neck corsets that were packaged with the limited edition of the single. Footage from the show was made available on the "Z" limited edition of "Ijime, Dame, Zettai".
2012–2013	Legend "I", Legend "D", and Legend "Z"	October 6, 2012 – February 1, 2013 (Japan)	4
Legend "I", Legend "D" Su-metal Seitansai, and Legend "Z", a series of four headlining shows by Babymetal (Legend "I" was performed twice at the first venue), promoted the release of the band's single "Ijime, Dame, Zettai". The series of shows was later made available in the video release Live: Legend I, D, Z Apocalypse (2013).
2013	Legend "1999" and Legend "1997"	June 30, 2013 – December 21, 2013 (Japan)	2
Legend "1999" Yuimetal & Moametal Seitansai and Legend "1997" Su-metal Seitansai were a pair of headlining shows held to commemorate the birthdays of Yuimetal and Moametal, and Su-metal, respectively. The shows were released as Live: Legend 1999 & 1997 Apocalypse (2014). The music video for "Gimme Chocolate!!" was filmed at the latter show, gaining over 100 million views.
2013	Legend "Fox Festival"	July 14, 2013 (Tokyo)	1
Legend "Fox Festival", promoted the release of the band's single "Megitsune". The show took place at Rock May Kan, the same venue as Legend "Corset Festival", and attendees were required to wear fox masks that were distributed prior to the show. Tickets were only given via purchases of "Megitsune" and by lottery at the venue.
2014	Legend "Corset Festival Extra" and Legend "Doomsday"	March 1, 2014 – March 2, 2014 (Tokyo)	2
Legend "Corset Festival Extra" Tenkaichi Metal Budokai and Legend "Doomsday" Shokan no Gi were a pair of headlining shows taking place at Nippon Budokan in March 2014. The conclusion of the second show marked the end of the first episode of the Metal Resistance. The shows would later be released in the video Live at Budokan: Red Night & Black Night Apocalypse (2015).
2015	Legend "2015" New Year Fox Festival	January 10, 2015 (Saitama)	1
Legend "2015" New Year Fox Festival was a special performance held by Babymetal at Saitama Super Arena, which concluded with the announcement of the Babymetal World Tour 2015. Footage from the show was released as one of three shows from the limited video release Trilogy: Metal Resistance Episode III – Apocalypse (2016).
2017	Legend "S" Baptism XX	December 2, 2017 – December 3, 2017 (Hiroshima)	2
Following the conclusion of The Five Fox Festival in Japan Tour, Babymetal announced Legend "S" Baptism XX, a pair of headlining shows in Hiroshima, Japan that commemorated the twentieth birthday of lead singer Su-metal, and marked the sixth episode of the Metal Resistance. The former show was made exclusive to members of the band's "The One" fanclub, and Yuimetal was absent from both shows due to reported illness. Footage from the shows was released as part of the video Legend S: Baptism XX (2018). This was also the last Babymetal performance for Kami Band Guitarist Mikio Fujioka. He died January 5, 2018, due to injuries sustained from an accidental fall just less than a week earlier on December 30.
2019	Babymetal Awakens: The Sun Also Rises and Babymetal Arises: Beyond the Moon	June 28, 2019 – July 7, 2019 (Japan)	4
On April 1, 2019, the band announced a third album set for release within the year, along with a set of headlining shows, Babymetal Awakens: The Sun Also Rises and Babymetal Arises: Beyond the Moon – Legend "M", in Yokohama and Nagoya, respectively. The shows will be released in 2020 as "The One" member-exclusive Blu-ray releases Babymetal Awakens: The Sun Also Rises and Babymetal Arises: Beyond the Moon – Legend M, respectively.

== Performances at festival concerts ==
Shows that are performed during concert tours are not listed.

Date	Event	Country	Performed song(s)	Ref.
August 7, 2011	United States of Odaiba 2011 (with Sakura Gakuin)	Japan	"Doki Doki ☆ Morning"	
August 28, 2011	Tokyo Idol Festival 2011: Eco & Smile (with Sakura Gakuin)	Japan	"Doki Doki ☆ Morning", "Ijime, Dame, Zettai"	
October 12, 2011	Tower Records Shinjuku 13th Birthday: No Music, No Idol?	Japan	"Doki Doki ☆ Morning", "Ijime, Dame, Zettai"	
January 9, 2012	Women's Power 20th Anniversary	Japan	"Doki Doki ☆ Morning", "Iine!", "Ijime, Dame, Zettai"	
April 8, 2012	2nd Idol Yokochō Festival!! Live Band Special	Japan	"Doki Doki ☆ Morning", "Iine!", "Ijime, Dame, Zettai"	
June 23, 2012	Pop'n Idol 02	Japan	"Doki Doki ☆ Morning", "Iine!", "Ijime, Dame, Zettai", "Headbangeeeeerrrrr!!!!!"	
August 4, 2012	Tokyo Idol Festival 2012 (with Sakura Gakuin)	Japan	"Doki Doki ☆ Morning", "Iine!", "Babymetal Death"	
August 19, 2012	Summer Sonic 2012 Tokyo	Japan	"Doki Doki ☆ Morning", "Iine!", "Headbangeeeeerrrrr!!!!!", "Babymetal Death"	
October 23, 2012	Anime Festival Asia 2012	Singapore	"Doki Doki ☆ Morning", "Iine!", "Uki Uki ★ Midnight", "Headbangeeeeerrrrr!!!!!", "Ijime, Dame, Zettai"	
May 26, 2013	Tokyo Metropolitan Rock Festival 2013	Japan	"Doki Doki ☆ Morning", "Iine!", "Catch Me If You Can", "Headbangeeeeerrrrr!!!!!", "Ijime, Dame, Zettai"	
July 7, 2013	Rock Beats Cancer Vol. 2	Japan	"Headbangeeeeerrrrr!!!!!", "Doki Doki ☆ Morning", "Ijime, Dame, Zettai" (with JAM Project)	
July 15, 2013	Summer Camp 2013	Japan	"Babymetal Death", "Megitsune", "Iine!", "Catch Me If You Can", "Headbangeeeeerrrrr!!!!!", "Ijime, Dame, Zettai"	
July 21, 2013	Join Alive 2013	Japan	"Megitsune", "Iine!", "Doki Doki ☆ Morning", "Catch Me If You Can", "Headbangeeeeerrrrr!!!!!", "Ijime, Dame, Zettai"	
August 4, 2013	Rock in Japan Festival 2013	Japan	"Megitsune", "Iine!", "Catch Me If You Can", "Doki Doki ☆ Morning", "Headbangeeeeerrrrr!!!!!", "Ijime, Dame, Zettai"	
August 10, 2013	Summer Sonic 2013 Tokyo	Japan	"Babymetal Death", "Megitsune", "Catch Me If You Can", "Doki Doki ☆ Morning", "Iine!", "Headbangeeeeerrrrr!!!!!", "Ijime, Dame, Zettai"	
August 11, 2013	Summer Sonic 2013 Osaka	Japan	"Babymetal Death", "Megitsune", "Catch Me If You Can", "Iine!", "Headbangeeeeerrrrr!!!!!", "Ijime, Dame, Zettai"	
September 22, 2013	Inazuma Rock Fes 2013	Japan	"Megitsune", "Iine!", "Catch Me If You Can", "Doki Doki ☆ Morning", "Headbangeeeeerrrrr!!!!!", "Ijime, Dame, Zettai"	
October 18, 2013	Tower Records Shinjuku 15th Anniversary Thanksgiving Special: Night of 15	Japan	"Babymetal Death", "Megitsune", "Kimi to Anime Ga Mitai – Answer for Animation With You", "Doki Doki ☆ Morning", "Headbangeeeeerrrrr!!!!!", "Ijime, Dame, Zettai"	
October 20, 2013	Loud Park 2013	Japan	"Babymetal Death", "Kimi to Anime Ga Mitai – Answer for Animation With You", "Catch Me If You Can", "Megitsune", "Akatsuki", "Headbangeeeeerrrrr!!!!!", "Ijime, Dame, Zettai"	
November 4, 2013	Japan Pop Culture Carnival 2013	Japan	"Touch", "Yuzurenai Negai", "Cat's Eye" (Su-metal with JAM Project)	
November 30, 2013	SkullMania Vol. 8	Japan	"Headbangeeeeerrrrr!!!!!", "Uki Uki ★ Midnight", "Iine!", "Catch Me If You Can", "Megitsune", "Ijime, Dame, Zettai"	
December 1, 2013	Act Against AIDS 2013	Japan	"Megitsune"	
December 30, 2013	Countdown Japan 13/14	Japan	"Gimme Chocolate!!", "Doki Doki ☆ Morning", "Iine!", "Megitsune", "Catch Me If You Can", "Headbangeeeeerrrrr!!!!!", "Ijime, Dame, Zettai"	
December 28, 2015	Countdown Japan 15/16	Japan	"Babymetal Death", "Doki Doki ☆ Morning", "Gimme Chocolate!!", "Catch Me If You Can", "Karate", "Ijime, Dame, Zettai", "Megitsune", "Road of Resistance"	
June 24, 2017	Pain in the Grass 2017	United States	"Babymetal Death", "Yava!", "Catch Me If You Can", "Megitsune", "Karate", "Gimme Chocolate!!"	
December 7–9, 2018	Good Things 2018	Australia	"Starlight", "Karate", "Gimme Chocolate!!", "Yava!"	
June 30, 2019	Glastonbury Festival 2019	United Kingdom	"Megitsune", "Elevator Girl", "Shanti Shanti Shanti", "Distortion", "Pa Pa Ya!!", "Gimme Chocolate!!", "Karate", "Road of Resistance"	

== Performances at Sakura Gakuin shows ==
Date	Event	Country	Performed song(s)	Ref.
November 28, 2010; November 28, 2010	Sakura Gakuin Festival ☆ 2010	Japan	"Doki Doki ☆ Morning"	
December 14, 2010	Sakura Gakuin 1st Single Release Event	Japan	"Doki Doki ☆ Morning"	
February 12, 2011	Happy Valentine: Hōkago Sakura no Shita ni Shūgō!!	Japan	"Doki Doki ☆ Morning"	
May 1, 2011; May 1, 2011	Sakura Gakuin 1st Album Release Event	Japan	"Doki Doki ☆ Morning"	
July 23, 2011; July 24, 2011	Sakura Gakuin 2011 Nendo New: Departure	Japan	"Doki Doki ☆ Morning", "Ijime, Dame, Zettai"	
October 23, 2011	Sakura Gakuin Festival ☆ 2011	Japan	"Doki Doki ☆ Morning", "Ijime, Dame, Zettai"	
March 25, 2012	Sakura Gakuin 2011 Nendo Graduation: Departure	Japan	"Iine!" (Vega mix ver.)	
May 6, 2012	Sakura Gakuin 2012 Nendo Transfer Student Ceremony	Japan	"Iine!", "Ijime, Dame, Zettai"	
October 23, 2012	Sakura Gakuin Festival ☆ 2012	Japan	"Headbangeeeeerrrrr!!!!!", "Ijime, Dame, Zettai"	
March 31, 2013	The Road to Graduation Final: Sakura Gakuin 2012 Nendo Graduation	Japan	"Headbangeeeeerrrrr!!!!!"	

== Performances at award shows ==
Date	Event	Country	Performed song(s)	Ref.
June 15, 2015	Metal Hammer Golden Gods 2015	United Kingdom	"Road of Resistance", "Gimme Chocolate!!" (with DragonForce)	
July 18, 2016	2016 Alternative Press Music Awards	United States	"Karate", "Painkiller", "Breaking the Law" (with Rob Halford)	

== Performances at television shows and specials ==
Date	Event	Country	Performed song(s)	Ref.
January 5, 2013	Happy Music	Japan	"Ijime, Dame, Zettai"	
January 6, 2013	Music Japan	Japan	"Ijime, Dame, Zettai"	
June 21, 2013	Music Dragon	Japan	"Megitsune"	
July 15, 2013	Music Japan Annex 2013 Summer	Japan	"Megitsune"	
January 18, 2014	Live Expo 2014 All Live Nippon Vol. 2	Japan	"Megitsune", "Doki Doki ☆ Morning", "Headbangeeeeerrrrr!!!!!", "Ijime, Dame, Zettai"	
February 7, 2014	Music Station	Japan	"Ijime, Dame, Zettai"	
December 26, 2014	Music Station Super Live 2014	Japan	"Ijime, Dame, Zettai"	
December 25, 2015	Music Station Super Live 2015	Japan	"Gimme Chocolate!!"	
April 3, 2016	MJ presents Babymetal Kakumei: Shōjo-tachi wa Sekai to Tatakau	Japan	"Road of Resistance", "Gimme Chocolate!!", "Awadama Fever", "Megitsune", "Karate", "Ijime, Dame, Zettai", "The One" (Unfinished ver.)	
April 5, 2016	The Late Show with Stephen Colbert	United States	"Gimme Chocolate!!"	
April 22, 2016	Music Station	Japan	"Karate"	

== Other shows ==
Date	Event	Country	Performed song(s)	Ref.
April 6, 2012	Babymetal × Kiba of Akiba Release Event	Japan	"Ijime, Dame, Zettai", "Iine!", "Doki Doki ☆ Morning", "Kimi to Anime Ga Mitai – Answer for Animation With You"	
July 7, 2012; July 7, 2012; July 8, 2012; July 8, 2012	Headbang Pilgrimage!!	Japan	"Doki Doki ☆ Morning", "Iine!", "Kimi to Anime Ga Mitai – Answer for Animation With You", "Ijime, Dame, Zettai", "Headbangeeeeerrrrr!!!!!"	
July 14, 2012; July 14, 2012	Uki Uki ☆ Afternoon	Japan	"Headbangeeeeerrrrr!!!!!", "Iine!"	
August 20, 2012	Sug Live Battle 2012 "Live! Tower Records Day" (with Sug and Tamurapan)	Japan	"Doki Doki ☆ Morning", "Kimi to Anime Ga Mitai – Answer for Animation With You", "Iine!", "Ijime, Dame, Zettai", "Headbangeeeeerrrrr!!!!!"	
December 25, 2012	Children's Winter Break Safety Christmas Campaign	Japan	"Ijime, Dame, Zettai"	
January 7, 2013	One Song! Explosive Live	Japan	"Onedari Daisakusen", "Ijime, Dame, Zettai"	
January 14, 2013	Live Release Event! "Ijime, Dame, Zettai" in Osaka	Japan	"Doki Doki ☆ Morning", "Iine!", "Kimi to Anime Ga Mitai – Answer for Animation With You", "Uki Uki ★ Midnight", "Headbangeeeeerrrrr!!!!!", "Ijime, Dame, Zettai"	
June 22, 2013	Megitsune Release Event: Mini-Live	Japan	"Megitsune", "Iine!", "Ijime, Dame, Zettai"	
June 23, 2013	Megitsune Release Event: Free Live	Japan	"Megitsune", "Ijime, Dame, Zettai", "Catch Me If You Can"	
December 28, 2013	Live in Singapore	Singapore	"Babymetal Death", "Kimi to Anime Ga Mitai – Answer for Animation With You", "Iine!", "Onedari Daisakusen", "Gimme Chocolate!!", "Uki Uki ★ Midnight", "Akatsuki", "Catch Me If You Can", "Headbangeeeeerrrrr!!!!!", "Doki Doki ☆ Morning", "Megitsune", "Ijime, Dame, Zettai"	
January 24, 2014	Kinniku Shōjo Tai × Babymetal (with Kinniku Shōjo Tai)	Japan	"Babymetal Death", "Megitsune", "Gimme Chocolate!!", "Akatsuki", "Onedari Daisakusen", "Catch Me If You Can", "Ijime, Dame, Zettai", "Headbangeeeeerrrrr!!!!!"	
February 2, 2014	Babymetal × Chthonic (with Chthonic)	Taiwan	"Babymetal Death", "Doki Doki ☆ Morning", "Iine!", "Gimme Chocolate!!", "Onedari Daisakusen", "Akatsuki", "Catch Me If You Can", "Ijime, Dame, Zettai", "Headbangeeeeerrrrr!!!!!", "Megitsune" (with Chthonic)	
