= Metal Resistance =

Studio album by Babymetal
- Released: March 29, 2016
- Recorded: 2014–2016
- Studio: Sony Music, Sydney
- Genre: Kawaii metal; power metal
- Length: 54:09
- Language: Japanese; English
- Label: BMD Fox; Toy's Factory; Amuse; earMUSIC; Sony Music Entertainment (2016 — 2021); Cooking Vinyl
- Producer: Kobametal

Babymetal chronology
Live at Budokan: Red Night (2015)	Metal Resistance (2016)	Live at Wembley (2016)

Singles from Metal Resistance
- 1. "Road of Resistance" Released: February 1, 2015; 2. "Karate" Released: March 25, 2016

Alternative cover
- Limited edition cover

Metal Resistance is the second studio album by Japanese heavy metal band Babymetal. It was first released on March 29, 2016, in Japan through BMD Fox Records, and on April 1, 2016, worldwide through earMusic, RED Associated Labels (RAL), and Sony Music Entertainment. Most work for the album began in 2014, shortly after the release of the band's debut album Babymetal. The members of the band describe the album as more diverse in heavy metal, with the recurring theme acquired while on tour.

Metal Resistance received generally positive reviews from music critics. The album managed to peak at number two on the Oricon Weekly Chart with first-week sales of 132,881 units, and has since been certified gold with over 230,000 copies sold in Japan. In the United States, the album debuted at number 39 on the Billboard 200, the highest rank for a Japanese artist since Kyu Sakamoto in 1963, with first-week sales of 12,914 units, and became the band's second album to top the World Albums chart. In the United Kingdom, it peaked at number fifteen on the UK Albums Chart, the highest position reached by a Japanese band. Two songs from the album—"Road of Resistance" and "Karate"—were released as singles prior to the album's release, and charted on the Billboard World Digital Songs chart.

== Background ==
Materials for the album formed around 2013, including the chorus from "Amore" and a live performance of the song "No Rain, No Rainbow", which did not appear on the band's debut album. More music, such as the opening track "Road of Resistance" was written after the release of the eponymous album, mainly during the Babymetal World Tour 2014. Kobametal explained that most of the songwriting coincided with the band's performances of the new songs before the album, with a constant need to tweak the music or lyrics before the official release.

In an interview by Gigwise, when asked about the meaning of the album title, lead vocalist Suzuka Nakamoto explained, "isn't about us resisting against anything as such, but in the last year of our activities it does feel like we're battling against something every time we step on stage". She said, concerning the sound in comparison to their debut album: "This album contains a lot more new and different types of metal that we've never done before. We've grown so much in the music that we do, and this album sounds a little bit older and more mature. It's been two years since the last one, and you can really hear our journey on this record." She further explained that “metal resistance” has been a recurring theme, often mentioned on their world tours. With the ideas of exploring what they can do, and their primary message of Metal Resistance, which is "to get everyone to come together as one", the name was chosen as it was the representation of the band at the time.

Comparing the record to the band's previous album, Yui Mizuno explained the band's challenge toward more music genres than before, as well as the inclusion of more positive lyrics. With the desire to send messages to the fans, the band also recorded a song in English, specifically "The One". As a result, more people would get to listen to the band's music. In a Loudwire interview, Moa Kikuchi described her experiences and feelings toward their sophomore release.

We were on the road touring for two years so we had a lot of confidence in the album. To be honest, we were anxious if we could make a better album than the previous album, but when I listened to the finished new Metal Resistance, it was such an interesting new album I was relieved and definitely full of confidence.

When asked about the decision to release two different versions of the album for the Japanese and international release, Kobametal stated that he did not want to deal with editions of the song having bonus tracks. "Syncopation" had a significantly Japanese feel to it, so it would present a more Japanese quality to the track listing. On the other hand, the song "From Dusk Till Dawn" contains elements of electronic dance music inspired by Skrillex, with inspiration from the bands Linkin Park and Bring Me the Horizon. This song seemed quite different from anything else in the band's repertoire, so the two track listings could tell two different stories starting from "Road of Resistance" and ending with "The One".

== Composition ==
According to The Japan Times, the album consists of a formula with some elements of "1980s hair metal and symphonic metal, which are perhaps more suited for mixing with J-pop than metal’s edgier subgenres." The album draws from various subgenres of metal; “Karate” contains elements of groove metal and nu metal, "Tales of The Destinies" derives from technical progressive metal, "The One" is inspired by symphonic metal, and "GJ!" has metalcore guitars with electronic flavors with rap metal. "Sis. Anger" is played mainly in black metal. To contrast, the Su-metal solo "No Rain, No Rainbow" is described as an "epic ’80s power ballad", while "Meta Taro" is more synth-driven with Viking metal. "Yava!" contains elements of ska and is described as having "clean guitars and punky, almost staccato verses" ramping up into "driving metal", while "Amore" is reminiscent of their previous record with elements of melodic speed metal. “Awadama Fever”, like "Gimme Chocolate!!", follows genres of drum and bass and bubblegum pop. The Japanese exclusive track "Syncopation" has elements of visual kei, while the international exclusive track "From Dusk Till Dawn" has a speed contrasting "Meta Taro", being faster and featuring "an epic, film soundtrack-worthy feel" and falsetto vocals.

In a Loudwire interview, Su-metal described the lyrics of "Awadama Fever", such as "mint-flavored time machine": "This song has a lot of kawaii elements. I have an impression that even though it's metal, it brings out a lot of our kawaii bits." Mizuno described the lyrics of the album as "very positive and have a lot of motivational elements to them. I hope that this record will uplift our listeners, and inspire them." Kikuchi expressed the goal of Metal Resistance: "We hope to be able to unite the world through music on this album - for it to be the bridge between us and the listeners. This is something we've put a lot of emphasis on with this album."

== Release and promotion ==
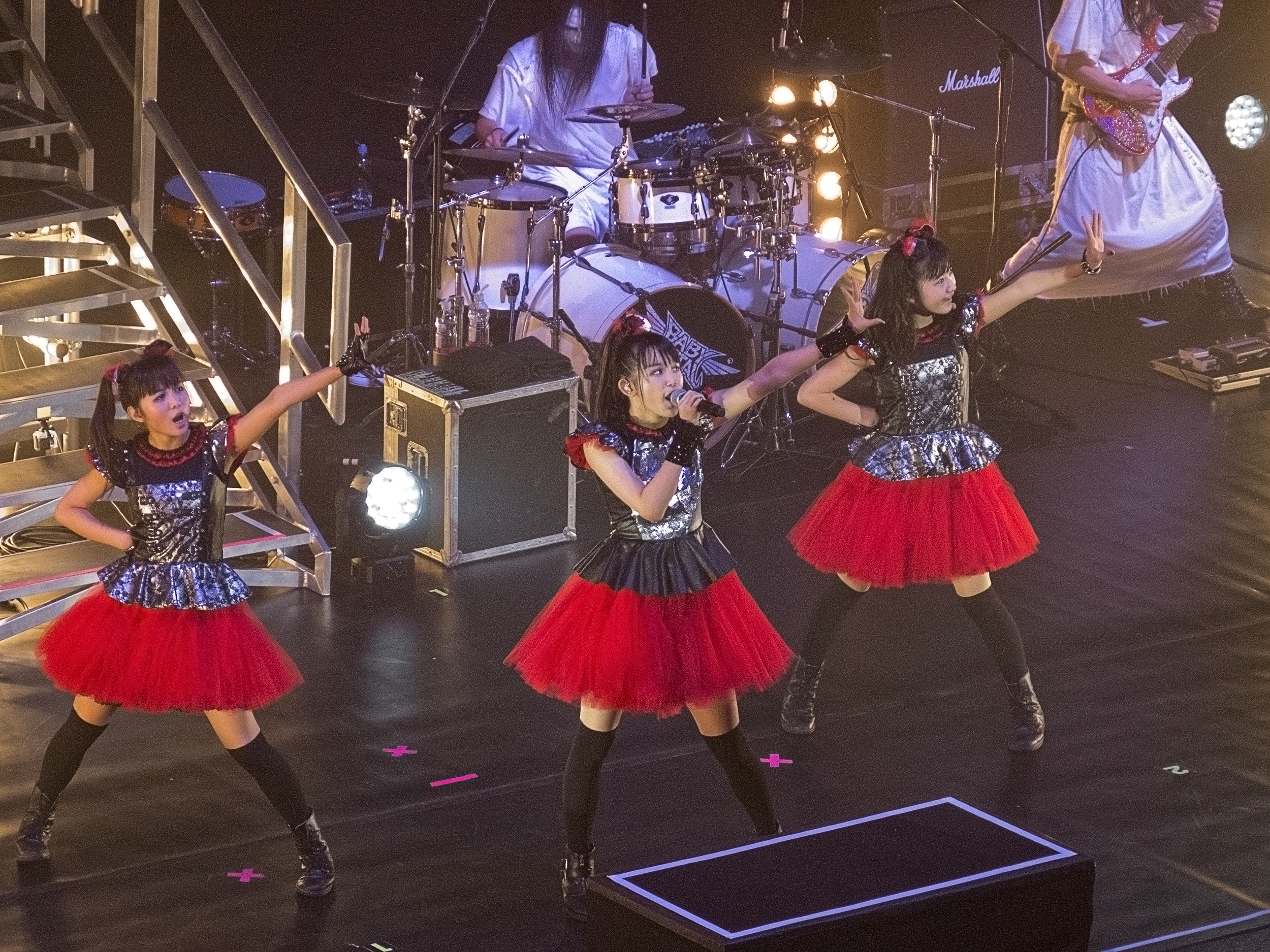
"Road of Resistance" was performed for the first time during the Babymetal World Tour 2014.

Metal Resistance was announced in December 2015 to coincide with news of a new world tour, with the album's title confirmed in January 2016. On February 19, the band released the artwork and track list for the three versions of the album, along with a February 25 release date for the album's lead single, "Karate". On February 25, 2016, a teaser for the album was released on the channel, featuring the song "Karate", which had been released as an airplay single the same day. The album was released to music stores in Japan on March 29, 2016, three days before the worldwide release date. On April 5, 2016, the band performed "Gimme Chocolate!!", from their debut album Babymetal on The Late Show with Stephen Colbert, marking their first appearance on television in the United States. On September 14, 2016, the limited edition of the album was re-released in commemoration of returning to Japan on the Babymetal World Tour 2016: Legend Metal Resistance, packaged with a paper jacket.

=== Tour ===
On December 13, 2015, a YouTube video was posted on the band's official channel for the previously untitled album, announced with its April 1 release dubbed "Fox Day". Simultaneously, a 2016 world tour was also announced, with its planned final performance date at Tokyo Dome. The tour was set to begin at Wembley Arena on April 2, 2016, the day after the album's worldwide release, and end at Tokyo Dome on September 19, 2016. On July 4, another date was announced for Tokyo Dome, extending the tour to September 20.

=== Singles and other songs ===
The song "Road of Resistance" was previously released as a digital single on February 1, 2015, and afterwards as a bonus track on the band's debut album Babymetal. It peaked on the Billboard World Digital Songs chart at number 22. On February 25, 2016, "Karate" was released as an airplay-only single in the United States, and its music video was uploaded on YouTube on March 17, 2016. The song charted at number two on the Billboard World Digital Songs chart. Su-metal described the song: "has not only Babymetal vibes, but also has Japanese elements. … Its lyrics portray a strong will to go on, no matter what happens in your life. We play shows with strong wills so we can relate with the lyrics in "Karate." We'll be delighted if listeners can feel positive energy by listening to this song."

A music video of "The One" filmed during the show Babymetal World Tour 2015 in Japan: The Final Chapter Of Trilogy – Act II at Yokohama Arena premiered in the United States on Billboard.com, and later made available on YouTube on March 26, 2016. According to Su-metal, fans of the group are collectively referred to as "the one". The song, along with "Tales of The Destinies" was initially a single track in production, and has a motif reminiscent to "We Are the World". The song was released in three versions, a Japanese version, an English version, and a stripped down English version. Concerning the English version of the song available on the "Out of Japan" edition of Metal Resistance, Su-metal explained: "Many people from different countries have asked us if we ever plan to sing an English song. We're extremely happy that we now have an English song that we can all sing together."

Prior to the album's release, the Su-metal solo "No Rain, No Rainbow" was performed during the concerts Legend "1999" Yuimetal & Moametal Seitansai and Legend "Doomsday" Shokan no Gi, each with a live video release. The melody draws inspiration from X Japan and Billy Joel. According to Su-metal, the song "could have been recoded [sic] for our first album, but I didn't really understand the content of its lyrics when I first sang this song three years ago. However, by performing this song at our shows, I found myself developing not only its vocal techniques, but also ways to express my emotions through this song in the process of my growth. I think "No Rain, No Rainbow" has grown into what it is now because of my experience performing the song at our shows." Kobametal stated that prior to the release of the album, the song was only performed those two times, because he found it rather difficult to perform without supporting stage production.

Additionally, "Awadama Fever" was performed at the live show Legend "2015" New Year Fox Festival in 2015, which was filmed and released via Blu-ray to "The One" fanclub members. Written by AA= band member Takeshi Ueda, the song is considered to be a pop crossover, along with "Gimme Chocolate!!" and "Doki Doki ☆ Morning". "Yava!" premiered during the band's Babymetal World Tour 2015 at Makuhari Messe on June 21, 2015, which became the band's biggest show at the time, with approximately 30,000 attendees. Between that performance of the song and the release of the album, Kobametal felt the need for rearrangement of the music, such as the removal of death growls from the chorus.

== Reception ==
=== Critical reception ===
Professional ratings
Aggregate scores
Source	Rating
Metacritic	74/100
Review scores
Source	Rating
AllMusic	3/5 stars
Alternative Press	4/5 stars
Blabbermouth.net	8/10
Consequence of Sound	B+
InterMedia	3/5 stars
Kerrang!	4/5 stars
NME	3/5 stars
The Observer	4/5 stars
Rock Sound	8/10

Metal Resistance received generally positive reviews from music critics, with most praising the vocal performance of the band members. At Metacritic, which assigns a normalized rating out of 100 to reviews from mainstream publications, the album received an average score of 74, which indicates "generally favorable reviews", based on eight reviews. Rock Sound critic Gav Lloyd wrote that the album addresses the wackiness of their debut album that "really came at the expense of truly great songs" and "seamlessly flits from one brilliantly bold idea to another with no dips in quality". A review by Kerrang! described the album as "As we say, brilliant fun. And shot fired." Jon Hadusek from Consequence of Sound wrote that the band hones "a fusion of technical metal, dance music, and power pop that’s both competent and emotionally invigorating", calling "Karate" and "From Dusk Till Dawn" essential tracks.

Phil Mongredien of The Observer called the album "rule-breaking", with praise for "GJ!" and "Sis. Anger", but criticism towards the "formulaic" "No Rain, No Rainbow" and the English lyrics of "The One". Alternative Press wrote that while the album's "musical textures and tropes can grow repetitive--Babymetal's aggressive enthusiasm and sincerity are impossible to resist." Tim Sendra from AllMusic claimed the record was made, in comparison to their debut album, "in favor of a heavier, more serious approach", and although he praised the performance of the three girls, he claimed that "their collaborators let them down." Jordan Bassett of NME praised the J-pop drawn "Amore", but called "Meta Taro" repetitive and concluded that the band's "adherence to the aforementioned formula can be quite boring".

=== Accolades ===
Year-end rankings

Publication	Accolade	Rank
Consequence	Top 50 Albums of 2016	31
Loudwire	20 Best Metal Albums of 2016	15
Metal Hammer	The 50 Best Metal Albums of 2016	30

Decade-end rankings

Publication	Accolade	Rank
Kerrang!	The 75 Best Albums of the 2010s	70
Metal Hammer	The 50 Best Metal Albums of the 2010s	7
Metal Hammer	The 50 Best Rock Albums of the 2010s	47

=== Chart performance ===
Metal Resistance debuted at number two on the Oricon Daily Chart on March 29, 2016, reaching the top of the chart on the album's worldwide release date. This album debuted at number two on the Oricon Weekly Chart with 132,881 physical copies, behind The JSB Legacy by Sandaime J Soul Brothers. In the United Kingdom, the album debuted at number fifteen on the UK Albums Chart, making Babymetal the highest-charting Japanese band ever on the chart. In the United States, it debuted at number 39 on the Billboard 200 and number 7 on the Digital Albums chart, shifting 12,914 equivalent album units (including album sales, equivalent track sales, and equivalent streams), of which 12,240 units are pure album sales. It is the highest-charting Japanese entry on the Billboard 200 in 53 years, since Kyu Sakamoto's Sukiyaki and Other Japanese Hits, which reached number 26 in 1963.

== Track listing ==
Standard edition
No.	Title	Lyrics	Music	Arrangement	Length
1.	"Road of Resistance"	Kitsune of Metal God^{[a]}; Mk-metal; Kxbxmetal	Mish-Mosh; Norimetal; Kyt-metal	Kyōtō (教頭)	5:18
2.	"Karate"	Yuyoyuppe	Yuyoyuppe	Yuppemetal	4:23
3.	"Awadama Fever" (あわだまフィーバー; "Bubble Fever")	Mk-metal; Kxbxmetal	Takeshi Ueda	Ueda	4:13
4.	"Yava!" (ヤバッ! Yaba!; "Oh no!")	Nakametal; Mk-metal; Kxbxmetal	Norimetal	Yuppemetal	3:48
5.	"Amore" (Amore -蒼星- Amore: Aoboshi; "Love: Blue Star")	Norimetal; Mk-metal; Kxbxmetal	Norimetal	Kyōtō	4:39
6.	"Meta Taro" (META! メタ太郎 Meta! Meta Tarō)	Kxbxmetal; Ryu-metal	Ryu-metal	Tatsuo; Ryu-metal	4:06
7.	"Syncopation" (シンコペーション Shinkopēshon)	Norimetal; Kxbxmetal	Norimetal	Megmetal	4:07
8.	"GJ!"	Nakata Caos (中田カオス); Yuyoyuppe	Yuyoyuppe	Yuppemetal	2:56
9.	"Sis. Anger"	Tsubometal; Tmetal	Tsubometal	Yuppemetal	3:45
10.	"No Rain, No Rainbow"	Yoshifu-metal; Mk-metal; Nakametal	Yoshifu-metal	Ledametal	4:50
11.	"Tales of The Destinies"	Kitsune of Metal God^{[a]}; Kxbxmetal	Mish-Mosh	Tatsuo; Mish-Mosh	5:35
12.	"The One"	Kitsune of Metal God^{[a]}; Kxbxmetal	Mish-Mosh	Tatsuo; Mish-Mosh	6:29
Total length:					54:09

"The One" limited edition
No.	Title	Lyrics	Music	Arrangement	Length
8.	"GJ!" (Reward edit) (GJ! -ご褒美編- GJ! -Gohōbihen-)	Nakata Caos; Yuyoyuppe	Yuyoyuppe	Yuppemetal	2:56
9.	"Sis. Anger"	Tsubometal; Tmetal	Tsubometal	Yuppemetal	3:45
10.	"No Rain, No Rainbow"	Yoshifu-metal; Mk-metal; Nakametal	Yoshifu-metal	Ledametal	4:50
11.	"Tales of The Destinies"	Kitsune of Metal God^{[a]}; Kxbxmetal	Mish-Mosh	Tatsuo; Mish-Mosh	4:55
12.	"The One" (Unfinished ver.)	Kitsune of Metal God^{[a]}; Kxbxmetal	Mish-Mosh	Tsubometal	3:39
Total length:					51:19

"Out of Japan" edition
No.	Title	Lyrics	Music	Arrangement	Length
7.	"From Dusk Till Dawn"	Kitsune of Metal God^{[a]}; Kxbxmetal; Tmetal	Yuyoyuppe	Yuppemetal	3:47
8.	"GJ!"	Nakata Caos; Yuyoyuppe	Yuyoyuppe	Yuppemetal	2:56
9.	"Sis. Anger"	Tsubometal; Tmetal	Tsubometal	Yuppemetal	3:45
10.	"No Rain, No Rainbow"	Yoshifu-metal; Mk-metal; Nakametal	Yoshifu-metal	Ledametal	4:50
11.	"Tales of The Destinies"	Kitsune of Metal God^{[a]}; Kxbxmetal	Mish-Mosh	Tatsuo; Mish-Mosh	5:35
12.	"The One" (English ver.)	Kitsune of Metal God^{[a]}; Kxbxmetal	Mish-Mosh	Tatsuo; Mish-Mosh	6:29
Total length:					53:49

Limited edition DVD — Tokyo Metropolitan Rock Festival 2015
No.	Title	Length
1.	"Megitsune" (メギツネ)	5:39
2.	"Iine!" (いいね！)	4:11
3.	"Catch Me If You Can"	5:55
4.	"Headbangeeeeerrrrr!!!!!" (ヘドバンギャー！！)	4:38
5.	"Road of Resistance"	6:25
6.	"Gimme Chocolate!!" (ギミチョコ！！)	4:54
7.	"Ijime, Dame, Zettai" (イジメ、ダメ、ゼッタイ)	7:13
Total length:		38:55

"The One" limited edition Blu-ray — Apocrypha: The Black Mass
No.	Title	Length
1.	"Road of Resistance"	8:50
2.	"Uki Uki ★ Midnight" (ウ・キ・ウ・キ★ミッドナイト)	3:26
3.	"Awadama Fever" (あわだまフィーバー)	4:14
4.	"Catch Me If You Can"	5:51
5.	"Rondo of Nightmare" (悪夢の輪舞曲)	4:22
6.	"Onedari Daisakusen" (おねだり大作戦)	3:28
7.	"Megitsune" (メギツネ)	5:43
8.	"Iine!" (いいね！)	4:14
9.	"Headbangeeeeerrrrr!!!!!" (ヘドバンギャー！！)	4:40
10.	"Ijime, Dame, Zettai" (イジメ、ダメ、ゼッタイ)	8:10
Total length:		52:58

"The One" limited edition Blu-ray — Apocrypha: The Red Mass
No.	Title	Length
1.	"Megitsune" (メギツネ)	7:53
2.	"Doki Doki ☆ Morning" (ド・キ・ド・キ☆モーニング)	3:52
3.	"Iine!" (いいね！)	4:15
4.	"Akatsuki" (紅月 -アカツキ-)	6:54
5.	"Song 4" (4の歌)	4:17
6.	"Catch Me If You Can"	5:54
7.	"Headbangeeeeerrrrr!!!!!" (ヘドバンギャー！！)	4:40
8.	"Ijime, Dame, Zettai" (イジメ、ダメ、ゼッタイ)	7:04
9.	"Gimme Chocolate!!" (ギミチョコ！！)	6:23
10.	"Road of Resistance"	7:02
Total length:		58:14

Notes

- ^{^[a]}"Kitsune of Metal God" refers to a god figure frequently mentioned in band materials and interviews (often as "Kitsune-sama" or the "Fox God"). Official credits under this name are registered to Kobametal.
- Herman Li and Sam Totman appear on "Road of Resistance", and are featured artists on the United Kingdom digital release.
- "Karate", "Yava!", "No Rain, No Rainbow" (only in the Japanese edition), and "The One" are stylized in all caps.
- "Tales of The Destinies" is cut shorter on "The One" limited edition to transition into "The One".

== Personnel ==
Credits adapted from Metal Resistance booklets and Google Play.

Personnel

- Suzuka Nakamoto (Su-metal) – lead vocals
- Yui Mizuno (Yuimetal) – lead and background vocals
- Moa Kikuchi (Moametal) – lead and background vocals
- Key Kobayashi (Kobametal / Kxbxmetal / Kitsune of Metal God) – executive producer, management, lyrics
- Takehiro Mamiya (Yuyoyuppe / Yuppemetal) – co-producer, arrangement, lyrics, mixing
- Ryugi Yokoi (Ryu-metal) – arrangement
- Tatsuya Tsubono (Tsubometal) – lyrics, music, arrangement
- Yuuya Shimizu (Tmetal) – lyrics
- Nobuaki Miyasaka (Mish-Mosh) – arrangement
- Sari Miyasaka (Mish-Mosh) – arrangement
- Takeshi Ueda – arrangement, mixing (by the courtesy of Speedster Records / Victor Entertainment)
- Kyoto – arrangement
- Tatsuo – arrangement
- Meg (Megmetal) – arrangement
- Leda (Ledametal) – guitar, bass, arrangement
- Herman Li – guitar (courtesy of Electric Generation Recordings Ltd. and Warner Music Japan Inc.)
- Sam Totman – guitar (courtesy of Electric Generation Recordings Ltd. and Warner Music Japan Inc.)

Production

- Watametal – recording
- Adrian Breakspear – recording
- Ettore Rigotti – mixing
- Yuyoyuppe – producing
- Takeshi Ueda – mixing
- Jens Bogren – mixing
- Koichi Hara – mixing
- Tue Madsen – mixing
- Tucky-metal (Parasight Mastering) – mastering
- Tue Madsen – Blu-ray mastering
- Sugaimetal (Cromanyon) – production producer (Blu-ray)
- Inni-metal (Inni Vision) – production director (Blu-ray)
- Shimonmetal – art direction, illustration, and design
- Yodametal (Rokushiki Co., Ltd.) – art direction, design
- Susumetal (Progress-M Co., Ltd.) – photography
- Datemetal (Takahashi Office) – wardrobe
- Kiemetal – wardrobe
- Hidametal – hair
- Hoshimetal (Signo) – make-up
- Yokometal (SMC) – art work coordination
- Norametal – coordination
- Wanimetal – production director, production editor (DVD)
- Hitometal – management
- Kakimetal – management
- Okametal – management
- Takemetal – management
- Hisametal (Amuse, Inc.) – management
- Akimetal – label
- Motemetal – label
- Tackmetal – label
- Rikometal – label
- Hamametal – label
- Matsumetal (Toy's Factory) – label
- Kichimetal – supervisor
- Hatametal – supervisor
- Rumimetal – supervisor
- Chibametal (Amuse, Inc.) – supervisor
- Inabametal (Toy's Factory) – supervisor

== Charts ==
=== Weekly charts ===
Weekly chart performance for Metal Resistance
Chart (2016–17)	Peak position
Australian Albums (ARIA)	7
Austrian Albums (Ö3 Austria)	22
Belgian Albums (Ultratop Flanders)	63
Belgian Albums (Ultratop Wallonia)	113
Canadian Albums (Billboard)	74
Dutch Albums (Album Top 100)	71
Finnish Albums (Suomen virallinen lista)	45
French Albums (SNEP)	108
German Albums (Offizielle Top 100)	36
Japanese Albums (Oricon)	2
Japanese Hot Albums (Billboard)	2
New Zealand Albums (RMNZ)	31
Scottish Albums (OCC)	12
Swiss Albums (Schweizer Hitparade)	55
UK Albums (OCC)	15
UK Independent Albums (OCC)	5
UK Rock & Metal Albums (OCC)	2
US Billboard 200	39
US Top Album Sales (Billboard)	17
US Independent Albums (Billboard)	4
US Top Rock Albums (Billboard)	6
US Top Hard Rock Albums (Billboard)	2
US World Albums (Billboard)	1

=== Monthly charts ===
Monthly chart performance for Metal Resistance
Chart (2016)	Peak position
Japanese Albums (Oricon)	4

=== Year-end charts ===
Year-end chart performance for Metal Resistance
Chart (2016)	Position
Japanese Albums (Oricon)	17
Japanese Albums (Billboard Japan)	15
US Top Hard Rock Albums (Billboard)	39
US World Albums (Billboard)	3

Chart (2017)	Position
US World Albums (Billboard)	10

== Certifications ==
Certifications for Metal Resistance
Region	Certification	Certified units/sales
Japan (RIAJ)	Gold	100,000^{^}
^{^} Shipments figures based on certification alone.

== Release history ==
Region	Date	Format	Label	Edition(s)	Catalog	Ref.
Japan	March 29, 2016	CD, DVD	BMD Fox Records; Toy's Factory; Amuse, Inc.	Limited	TFCC-86545	
Japan	March 29, 2016	CD	BMD Fox Records; Toy's Factory; Amuse, Inc.	Standard	TFCC-86546	
Japan	April 1, 2016	LP; digital download	BMD Fox Records; Toy's Factory; Amuse, Inc.	Standard	PPTF-3870	
Japan	April 1, 2016	CD, Blu-ray	BMD Fox Records; Amuse, Inc.	"The One" limited	ONEC-0002	
United Kingdom	April 1, 2016	CD; LP; digital download	earMusic	"Out of Japan"	0210923EMU	
Germany	April 1, 2016	CD; LP; digital download	earMusic	"Out of Japan"	0210923EMU	
United States	April 1, 2016	CD; LP; digital download	RAL; Sony Music Entertainment	"Out of Japan"	8875193202	
Japan	September 14, 2016	CD, DVD	BMD Fox Records; Toy's Factory; Amuse, Inc.	Limited (Visiting Japan Commemoration)	TFCC-86572	
