= Megitsune =

2013 single by Babymetal

- Standard edition cover

Single by Babymetal

from the album Babymetal
- Language: Japanese
- B-side: "Akatsuki" (standard) "Onedari Daisakusen" (limited)
- Released: June 19, 2013
- Recorded: 2011–2013
- Genre: Kawaii metal; metalcore; speed metal
- Length: 4:09
- Label: BMD Fox; Toy's Factory; Amuse
- Composer: Norimetal
- Lyricists: Mk-metal; Norimetal
- Producers: Kobametal; Yuyoyuppe (arrangement)

Babymetal singles chronology
"Ijime, Dame, Zettai" (2013)	"Megitsune" (2013)	"Road of Resistance" (2015)

Music video
- "Megitsune" on YouTube

"Megitsune" (メギツネ; "Vixen") is the second major label single by the Japanese kawaii metal band Babymetal. It was released in Japan on June 19, 2013 as the fifth single from the album Babymetal. It is also the first single released independently from the idol group Sakura Gakuin.

== Release and promotion ==
The single was first announced for a June release on April 1, 2013. The single was released in four versions: a standard edition and three limited editions. The "Ki", "Tsu", and "Ne" (Kitsune means "fox" in Japanese) limited editions included single artwork focused on Nakamoto, Mizuno, and Kikuchi respectively, and their included DVDs feature footage of two songs from each of the live performances from Live: Legend I, D, Z Apocalypse. Additionally, the single included a chance to contain a ticket to the premium event Kitsune Festival at Meguro Rock May Kan on July 14, 2013.

To promote the release, the band was featured in the June issue of Marquee and on the cover of the July issue of Hedoban, in addition to collaborating with Tower Records for the 34th rendition of the event No Music, No Idol?.

=== Babymetal Death Match Tour 2013: May Revolution ===
Babymetal Death Match Tour 2013: May Revolution
- Promotional tour by Babymetal
- Start date: May 10, 2013
- End date: May 18, 2013
- No. of shows: 4

Babymetal concert chronology
- Babymetal Death Match Tour 2013: May Revolution (2013); Babymetal World Tour 2014 (2014)

The Babymetal Death Match Tour 2013: May Revolution (BABYMETAL DEATH MATCH TOUR 2013 -五月革命-, Babymetal Death Match Tour 2013 -Gogatsu Kakumei-) was a promotional concert tour by Babymetal, occurring in conjunction with the promotion of "Megitsune". The band performed four shows, with two on the final tour date, at the same venue. Customers who purchased tickets to the tour could receive an exclusive edition of the single, with a remix by Yuyoyuppe, under the name DJ'Tekina//Something.

According to Mizuno, the tour was designed to be a "training tour". During each of the four shows the three members wore stage costumes for the eras of "Doki Doki ☆ Morning" (which had become nostalgically small for them), "Headbangeeeeerrrrr!!!!!", and "Ijime, Dame, Zettai", respectively, with the final show premiering new costumes for "Megitsune".

List of concerts, showing date, city, country, and venue
Date	City	Country	Venue
Asia
May 10, 2013	Osaka	Japan	BigCat
May 17, 2013	Tokyo	Japan	Zepp DiverCity
May 18, 2013	Tokyo	Japan	Zepp DiverCity
May 18, 2013	Tokyo	Japan	Zepp DiverCity

== Composition ==
=== "Megitsune" ===
"Megitsune" has been described as "festival metal". Alongside the serious heavy metal tone, there is a mix of Western-style and Eastern-style music, noticeably with the use of Japanese traditional instruments. Unlike screams in traditional heavy metal, "Megitsune" is filled with festival chants by Mizuno and Kikuchi like "wasshoi" and "sore sore", while Nakamoto sings in the melodramatic style of enka. The bridge has significant variety in genre, with elements of dubstep as well as interpolations from the traditional Japanese folk song "Sakura Sakura".

The song contains lyrics such as "from the time of birth, women are actresses" which reflect on the song's theme of women remaining strong when living with their varied facial expressions. The song relates foxes, which disguises themselves for deception in Japanese mythology, to women, who disguise themselves with makeup. According to Nakamoto, foxes are similar to women as they can keep their true feeling hidden, even through hard times, leaving a cool impression. The last chorus contains the phrase "underestimate [maidens] at your own peril" (なめたらいかんぜよ, nametara ikan ze yo; literally "if you underestimate, it would be regrettable"), which is also famously said by Masako Natsume's character in the 1982 yakuza film "Onimasa"; whether or not this was intentional has never been confirmed.

Recording had begun shortly after "Ijime, Dame, Zettai", with a tone reminiscent of "Doki Doki ☆ Morning" and "Iine!". After several rounds of remixing, taiko drums were added while the lyrics remained the same. In a Billboard interview about the band's album Metal Resistance, Su-metal explained that the song "is popular among international fans, and I have a feeling that "Karate" will be something close to "Megitsune."" George Garner of Kerrang! called the song "the most hyper song [Babymetal] have ever put their name to."

=== Other songs ===
Performed solely by Nakamoto, "Akatsuki" (紅月 -アカツキ-; "Crimson Moon") is considered to be in the genre of speed metal. The song debuted as background music during the first live performance of "Iine!". Nakamoto went through voice training as the song was challenging with high tones. With more performances, her vocal performance improved as she stopped singing flat. Being her first solo, Nakamoto felt accomplished being able to sing the entire song by herself. While writing about the band's performance at Wembley Arena, Mark Beaumont contrasted it with the previous songs "Awadama Fever", "Iine!", and "Yava!", stating it had a darker tone, as "a show-tune ballad sung by Su-metal in a black cape, running along a flame-flanked ego ramp".

Under the stage name "Black Babymetal", Mizuno and Kikuchi perform "Onedari Daisakusen" (おねだり大作戦; "Begging Operation") in the style of rap metal, with dialogue-style lyrics in the nature of small devils. Due to the childish nature of the lyrics, Mizuno sang the song like a baby. Nakamoto has background vocals in the chorus, in a cool manner. Daniel Robson of The Guardian called the lyrics of Babymetal "delightfully tongue-in-cheek", explaining how "Onedari Daisakusen" "offers practical advice to teens on how to extract extra pocket money from one’s father with a well-timed shoulder-massage/flattery combo".

== Reception ==
"Megitsune" received positive acclaim from music critics. Tomonori Shiba of M-ON! Press wrote that "Megitsune" has an intro filled with the shamisen, bass guitar, synths, and flying shouts of "Sore! Sore!", signifying its festival-like nature, fusing the genres of metalcore and "wa" (和; Japanese elements). Like the music of Crossfaith and Fear, and Loathing in Las Vegas, it contains elements of electro-trance music. He further compared Nakamoto's vocal performance to that of Evanescence band member Amy Lee, calling the line "Kitsune. Kitsune. I am Megitsune" in the bridge stimulating. Patrick St. Michel of The Japan Times considered the song one of the highlights on the album, praising it for not depending on the band's "gimmicks". He further called it and "Doki Doki ☆ Morning" memorable and similarly constructed to "Gimme Chocolate!!".

While reviewing a performance at Brixton Academy, Colin McQuistan of The Huffington Post UK described "Akatsuki" as an opportunity for Nakamoto to "show off her remarkably powerful voice", while "wonderfully bonkers" "Onedari Daisakusen" gave Mizuno and Kikuchi an opportunity to "lead the audience on a wildly merry journey".

The single peaked at number seven on the Oricon Weekly Singles Chart, selling 22,000 copies that week. The song also charted on the Billboard Japan Hot 100, peaking at number 16 in the week of July 1, 2013. It also managed to peak at number two on the Oricon Daily Singles Chart.

"Megitsune" was used as the opening theme for the Japanese talk/variety show Hakkiri 5: Sonna ni Sukarete Inai 5-nin ga Sekai o Sukuu.

"Megitsune" is used as one of the two pieces of walk-on music for Japanese darts player Mikuru Suzuki, the other being "Baby Shark" by Pinkfong.

== Music video ==
A teaser for the single, featuring a sulphur-crested cockatoo named Robin seemingly headbanging to the song, was first uploaded to YouTube via the Toy's Factory channel on May 31, 2013, with the full music video, directed by Takuya Tada, uploaded to the official Babymetal channel on June 4, 2013.

The music video was shot on location at the Asagaya Shinmei Shrine in Tokyo; it is now a popular spot for Babymetal fans from outside Japan to visit. The three members are shown dancing in Noh theater alongside the "Kitsune band" (using traditional Japanese instruments) within the traditional scenery of Japan; this forms the significant contrast found in the music (specifically between metal and wa), which has since garnered over 79 million views as of June 2022. In the last chorus, Nakamoto threateningly reveals that her microphone contains a hidden blade, while saying the aforementioned phrase "underestimate maidens at your own peril".

During the shooting of the music video, Kikuchi's outfit tore at the armpit; similar incidents had previously occurred at live performances.

== Live performances ==
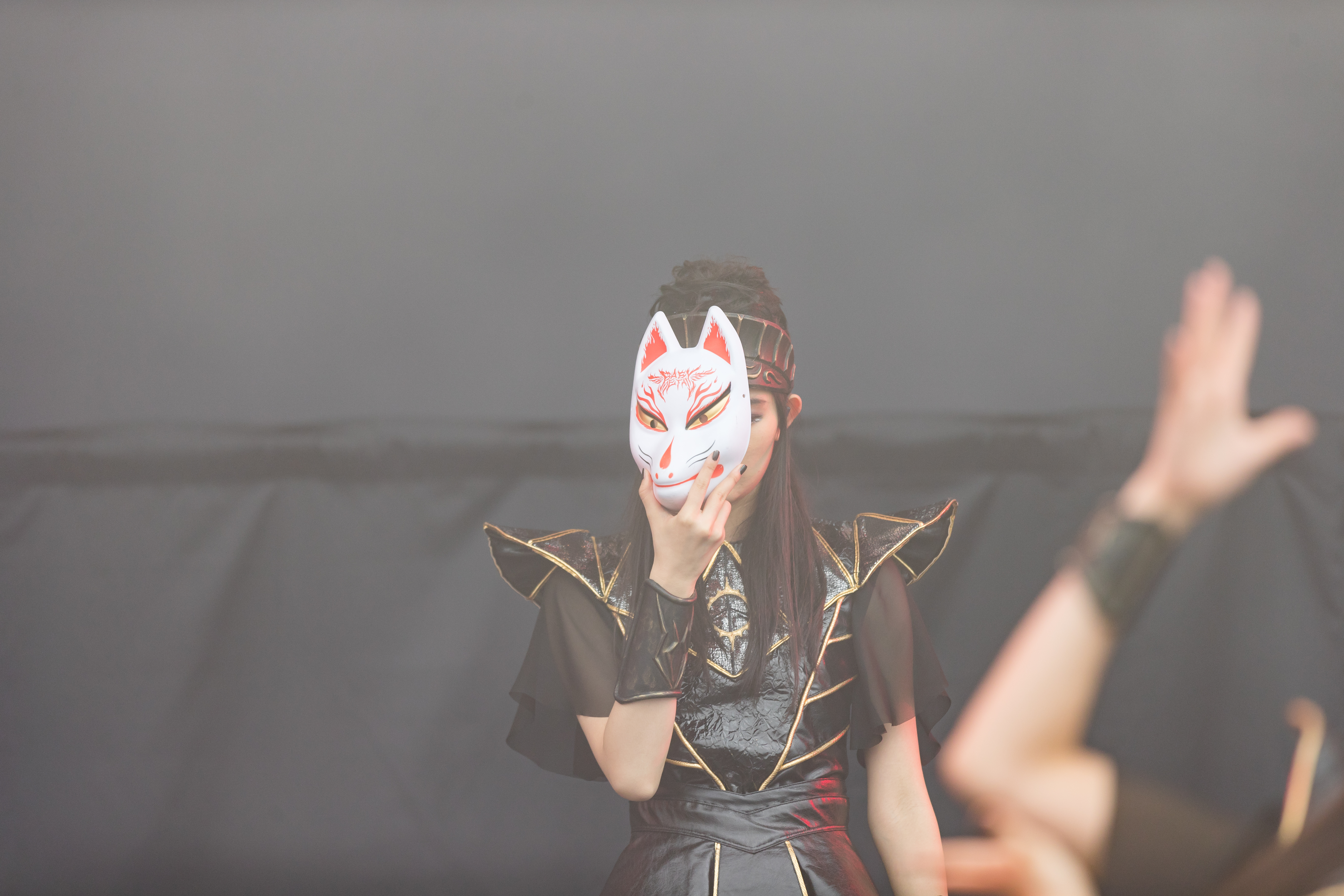
During the bridge of "Megitsune", Nakamoto performs with a Kitsune mask partially concealing her face from the crowd.

The band performed the song on the Nippon TV program Music Dragon, which would be broadcast on June 21, 2013. The band also performed the song at the single's release event Pray for Success with "Inarin" & Mini Live at Tower Records Shibuya on June 22, 2013. The next day, the song was performed again at a free concert at the DiverCity Tokyo Plaza Festival. Later, they performed the song on the NHK General TV program Music Japan Annex, which was broadcast on July 16, 2013. In February 2014, the band performed the song with Taiwanese band Chthonic.

During the live performances, Nakamoto is shown holding a Kitsune mask to her face during the bridge, before tossing it out into the crowd.

== Track listings and formats ==
Standard edition
No.	Title	Lyrics	Music	Arrangement	Length
1.	"Megitsune" (メギツネ)	Mk-metal; Norimetal	Norimetal	Yuyoyuppe	4:09
2.	"Akatsuki" (紅月 -アカツキ-)	Nakametal; Tsubometal	Tsubometal	Kyoto (教頭)	5:29
3.	"Megitsune" (Air Vocal ver.)		Norimetal	Yuyoyuppe	4:09
4.	"Akatsuki" (Air Vocal ver.)		Tsubometal	Kyoto	5:28
Total length:					19:15

"Ki", "Tsu", and "Ne" limited edition CD
No.	Title	Lyrics	Music	Arrangement	Length
1.	"Megitsune" (メギツネ)	Mk-metal; Norimetal	Norimetal	Yuyoyuppe	4:09
2.	"Onedari Daisakusen" (おねだり大作戦)	Nakata Caos (中田カオス); Ryu-metal; Fuji-metal	Team-K	Tatsuo; Kxbxmetal	3:17
Total length:					7:26

"Ki" edition DVD – Digest of Legend "I" at Shibuya O-East (10/6/2012)
No.	Title	Length
1.	"Overture / Doki Doki ☆ Morning" (Overture～ド・キ・ド・キ☆モーニング)
2.	"Headbangeeeeerrrrr!!!!!" (ヘドバンギャー！！)

"Tsu" edition DVD – Digest of Legend "D" Su-metal Seitansai at Akasaka Blitz (12/20/2012)
No.	Title	Length
1.	"Babymetal Death"
2.	"Kimi to Anime ga Mitai – Answer for Animation With You" (君とアニメが見たい〜Answer for Animation With You)

"Ne" edition DVD – Digest of Legend "Z" at Zepp Tokyo (2/1/2013)
No.	Title	Length
1.	"Overture / Ijime, Dame, Zettai" (Overture～イジメ、ダメ、ゼッタイ)
2.	"Catch Me If You Can"

May Revolution Exclusive promotional edition – Standard, Su-metal, Yuimetal, and Moametal edition CD
No.	Title	Remixer	Length
1.	"Megitsune" (メギツネ)		4:09
2.	"Megitsune" (Tekina Remix) (メギツネ -TEKINA Remix-)	DJ'Tekina//Something	3:18
Total length:			7:27

== Credits and personnel ==
Credits adapted from "Megitsune" standard and limited "Tsu" single liner notes.

Recording and management

- Recorded at ABS Recording, MukuStudio, Sound Arts Studio, S.O.L.I.D. Sound Lab, and Heat [sic] Beat Recording Studio
- Mixed at King Sekiguchidai Studio
- Mastered at Parasight Mastering

Personnel

- Suzuka Nakamoto (SU-METAL) – vocals (lead and background)
- Yui Mizuno (YUIMETAL) – vocals (lead and background)
- Moa Kikuchi (MOAMETAL) – vocals (lead and background)
- Key Kobayashi (Kobametal / KxBxMETAL) – executive producer, arrangement
- Millennium Japan (millennium JAPAN) – executive producer
- Tucky – mastering
- Miki Watanabe (MK-METAL) – lyrics
- Norikazu Nakayama (NORiMETAL / NAKAMETAL / 中田カオス) – lyrics, music
- Tatsuya Tsubono (TSUBOMETAL) – lyrics, music
- Ryugi Yokoi (RYU-METAL) – lyrics
- Shinichi Fujita (FUJI-METAL) – lyrics
- Shuhei Takahashi (TEAM-K) – music
- Kazuki Higashihara (TEAM-K) – music
- Takehiro Mamiya (Yuyoyuppe / DJ'TEKINA//SOMETHING) – arrangement, audio mixing, remixer
- Kyoto (教頭) – arrangement
- Tatsuo (tatsuo) – arrangement, guitar, bass
- Masatake Osato – recording
- Naoki Ibaraki – recording
- Seiji Toda – audio mixing
- Hironobu Takikawa – audio mixing
- Leda – guitar

== Charts ==
=== Weekly charts ===
Chart (2013)	Peak position
Japan (Oricon)	7
Japan Hot 100 (Billboard)	16
Japan Hot Singles Sales (Billboard)	7
Japan Adult Contemporary Airplay (Billboard)	69
US World Digital Songs (Billboard)	14

=== Daily charts ===
Chart (2013)	Peak position
Japan (Oricon)	2

== Cover versions ==
Violinist Ayako Ishikawa covered "Megitsune" on the violin; the song appeared on her 2016 album Sakura Symphony.

On December 7, 2014, Sakura Gakuin members Aiko Yamaide and Megumi Okada covered "Onedari Daisakusen" as a "One-Night Shuffle Unit" in the concert Sakura Gakuin ☆ 2014: Celebration in December.

== Release history ==
Region	Date	Format	Label	Edition(s)
Japan	June 19, 2013	CD; digital download	BMD Fox Records; Toy's Factory; Amuse, Inc.	Standard
Japan	June 19, 2013	CD, DVD	BMD Fox Records; Toy's Factory; Amuse, Inc.	"Ki", "Tsu", and "Ne" limited
Worldwide	June 19, 2013	Digital download	Toy's Factory	Standard
