= List of kawaii metal musical groups =

This is a list of kawaii metal musical groups. Kawaii metal is a musical genre that blends elements of heavy metal and J-pop that was pioneered in Japan in the early 2010s. Inclusion to this list is based on reliable sources and the musical acts themselves do not necessarily self-identify as such, and some of these groups are also categorized into other rock and metal subgenres.

Band	Country	Formed	Disbanded	Ref.
Babymetal	Japan	2010	–	
Babybeard	Japan	2020	–	
Dazzle Vision	Japan	2003	2015	
Deadlift Lolita	Japan	2017	–	
Desurabbits	Japan	2013	2021	
FruitPochette	Japan	2012	–	
Ironbunny	Japan	2019	2021	
Kamen Joshi	Japan	2013	–	
Ladybaby	Japan	2013	–	
Metal Paws	Chile	2022	–	
Necronomidol	Japan	2014	2022 (hiatus)	
Passcode	Japan	2013	–	
