= Desurabbits =

Japanese idol group

DESURABBITS
- Also known as: DEATHRABBITS, DESU.RABBITS
- Origin: Japan
- Genres: J-pop, death metal, kawaii metal, digital hardcore
- Years active: 2013–2021
- Label: G-angle Records
- Members: Yuzu Okawa; Emi Mochizuki; Karin Yasui; Bucho (Akira Kanzaki)
- Website: g-records.jp/desurabbits

Desurabbits (stylized as DESURABBITS (デスラビッツ)) was a Japanese idol group based in Tokyo. Alongside contemporary idol groups such as Babymetal, they are notable for being one of the early pioneers of the death metal/J-pop cross-over music style known as "japanese death pop". Their third album (released on 31 March 2021) debuted at number 86 in the weekly Oricon album sales charts and their eleventh single (released on 15 April 2020) debuted at number 20 in the weekly Oricon single sales charts, making it their most commercially successful single to date.

== History ==
Formed in November 2013, the group's three female members were originally part of the Usa Usa Girls Club (usa☆usa少女倶楽部) idol group and initially performed on a shared billing with them at the same venues. Between 2013 and 2016 DESURABBITS performed as DEATHRABBITS (デスラビッツ), and this name may have been directly inspired by the usa part of the earlier group's name (which is an abbreviation of the romanized Japanese word for rabbit, usagi (ウサギ)) and the group's main musical influence (death metal).

In a spoof video message to fans published on 13 November 2016, the group announced that they had disbanded and the members had gone their separate ways because they had become disenchanted with the idol business. In its place, a "new" group called DESU.RABBITS (です。ラビッツ) was to be formed.

On 1 January 2019 the group announced the arrival of a "rabbit revolution", a reference to the forthcoming announcement on 5 February 2019 that the group's name would be changing to DESURABBITS for the release of their ninth single Graduation Girl - Future Picture (卒業少女-未来絵-).

During a live-streamed performance in November 2020 (on the seventh anniversary of the group's formation), the group announced that they intended to disband in June 2021. Reasons cited for this decision mentioned the length of time the group had been together and the members now wanting to pursue new opportunities, and also the effect the Coronavirus pandemic had had on the group's long-term viability; this effect was more pronounced for DESURABBITS because of their focus on live performances rather than album/single sales. The group's final live solo performance was on 20 June 2021 at the Zepp Haneda music hall in Tokyo.

The group's fans are collectively known as the "DESURABBITS Army".

== Members ==
The group is composed of three female artists (Yuzu Okawa, Emi Mochizuki and Karin Yasui) and one male artist (Akira Kanzaki, officially known as Bucho). The notes added to some of their online music videos describe the group as "[this] unique collaboration, Bucho and three little junior high school girls" who are "dreaming to become famous Japanese idols". Bucho is the group's founder and producer, and plays a prominent role in live performances as well as appearing on most of the group's songs.

Each of the group members has an assigned colour, which was used extensively on cover art for the first two albums and six singles to help distinguish the female members as the artwork only included cartoon/artistic representations of them rather than actual photos. In 2019 the colour scheme was informally discontinued, with the group now wearing themed outfits incorporating the new logo. For the release of their eleventh single In the blink of an eye (一瞬で) a new colour scheme was introduced.

| Name | Colour (2013-2019) | Colour (2020-2021) | Birth date and age | Notes |
|---|---|---|---|---|
| Yuzu Okawa (大川柚) | Purple | Red | 24 December 2000 (age 25) | Yuzu is the group's leader and spokesperson, and engages directly with the audience during live performances. |
| Emi Mochizuki (望月愛実) | Pink | Blue | 5 January 2002 (age 24) | Emi occasionally performs solo and has her own YouTube channel dedicated to cover versions. |
| Karin Yasui (安井夏鈴) | Green | Yellow | 19 August 2000 (age 25) | Karin is the group's "mood maker" and is often heard during songs conversing with Bucho and questioning his motives. |
| Bucho (Akira Kanzaki) (部長(神崎晃)) | Black | Black | 7 January 1978 (age 48) | Akira is a founder member of the digital hardcore music duo AKIRADEATH and also performs live DJ sets in the guise of Bucho. |

== Music style ==
The group's songs exhibit an eclectic mix of influences, including death metal, J-pop, kawaii metal, jazz fusion, electronic dance music and digital hardcore. Additionally, the group have recorded traditional ballad-style songs with piano accompaniment.

A common motif in many of the group's songs is the use of the onomatopoeic giseigo phrase "pyon pyon", to suggest the hopping sound that rabbits make. Their songs are also notable for including humorous dialogue between Bucho and the female members, usually with Bucho giving orders to the girls in the style of a military commander or the girls answering back at Bucho or making fun of him. In 7 Principles of the DEATHRABBITS Army (デスラビッツ軍の七ケ条) Yuzu remarks mid-song that "we can never understand anything Bucho says, so anyway...", and in The Season for Falling in Love (恋する季節) the girls decide part-way through the song that the lyrics are too depressing and they're going to change them to make the song happier and more positive.

An overriding theme of the group's first two albums, which could be considered concept albums, describes a future alien invasion of earth. In Feelings of the Rabbit (うさぎのきもち) this theme is discussed in detail and the accompanying music video includes scenes where a UFO arrives on earth and starts attacking cities while the group look on in disbelief. The success (or otherwise) of this invasion is dependent on whether humans can put aside their differences to work together to fend off the alien threat. The "alien threat" concept can also be read as a wry commentary on the notoriously competitive J-pop idol scene, humorously referred to in earlier interviews with Bucho as the "idol warring states era" (アイドル戦国時代). In order for the group to survive and realise their dream of success, they must compete against the vast promotional budgets of the major talent agencies and record labels. In 7 Principles of the DEATHRABBITS Army (デスラビッツ軍の七ケ条) Bucho talks about a "fixed game", suggesting that the threat they are battling against has an unfair advantage.

== Discography ==
=== Singles ===
| No. | Title | Title, rōmaji (unofficial English translation) | Release date | Catalogue number | Album | Notes |
|---|---|---|---|---|---|---|
| 1 | アイドルSTAR WARS | Aidoru STAR WARS (Idol STAR WARS) | 13 November 2013 | GACD-0002 | The 1st USAGI War (第一次うさぎ大戦) | Maxi CD. |
| 2 | 恋する季節 | Koisuru kisetsu (The Season for Falling in Love) | 2 April 2014 | GACD-0005 | The 1st USAGI War (第一次うさぎ大戦) | Maxi CD. |
| 3 | お祭りJAPAN!!告白Night | Omatsuri JAPAN!! Kokuhaku Night (Festival JAPAN!! Love Confession Night) | 16 July 2014 | GACD-0007; GACD-0009 | The 1st USAGI War (第一次うさぎ大戦) | Maxi CD (GACD-0007).Limited edition "ramen" CD (GACD-0009). |
| 4 | うさぎのきもち 中二の夏。おじさんの夏。 | Usagi no kimochi (Feelings of the Rabbit); Chuni no natsu, Ojisan no natsu (A 14 Year Old's Summer, An Old Man's Summer) | 15 July 2015 | GACD-0014 | The 2nd USAGI War (第二次うさぎ大戦) | Maxi CD double A-side. |
| 5 | なんで？ | Nande? (Why?) | 11 November 2015 | GACD-0016; GACD-0017 | The 2nd USAGI War (第二次うさぎ大戦) | Maxi CD (GACD-0016). Limited edition "ramen" CD (GACD-0017). |
| 6 | Anger | Anger (Anger) | 16 November 2016 | GACD-0021; GACD-0022 | — | Maxi CD (GACD-0021). Limited edition "ramen" CD (GACD-0022). |
| 7 | ですまスプリング ～そろそろ敬語を使ってみませんか～ | Desuma supuringu ～Sorosoro keigo o tsukatte mimasenka～ (It's Spring ～Let's try using honorifics properly～) | 24 May 2017 | GACD-0024; GACD-0025 | — | Maxi CD (GACD-0024). Limited edition "ramen" CD (GACD-0025). |
| 8 | みんなおいでよ！ですラビランド！〜アイドル界の闇〜 | Minna oideyo! Desurabirando! 〜Aidoru-kai no yami〜 (Come along everyone! Desurabi Land! 〜The darkness of the idol world〜) | 21 February 2018 | GACD-0027; GACD-0028 | — | Maxi CD (GACD-0027). Limited edition "ramen" CD (GACD-0028). |
| 9 | 卒業少女-未来絵- でも、逃げんな | Sotsugyou shoujo -Mirai e- (Graduation Girl -Future Picture-); Demo, nigenna (Don't run away!) | 20 March 2019 | GACD-0029 | — | Maxi CD double A-side. |
| 10 | Magic of Butterfly-成蝶- | Magic of Butterfly -Nari chou- (Magic of Butterfly -Metamorphosis-) | 4 September 2019 | GACD-0030 | — | Maxi CD. |
| 11 | 一瞬で | Isshun de (In the blink of an eye) | 15 April 2020 | GACD-0031; GACD-0032 | — | Maxi CD "[Type-A]" edition (GACD-0031). Maxi CD "[Type-B]" edition (GACD-0032) |
| 12 | 無視するな、君の色は君で決めればいい | Mushi suru na, kimi no iro wa kimi de kimereba ii (Don't ignore it, you can choose your colour) | 5 March 2021 | — | JUMP | Digital download. |

=== Albums ===
| No. | Title | Translated title (official) | Release date | Catalogue number |
|---|---|---|---|---|
| 1 | 第一次うさぎ大戦 | The 1st USAGI War | 3 September 2014 | GACD-0010 |
| 2 | 第二次うさぎ大戦 | The 2nd USAGI War | 1 June 2016 | GACD-0019 |
| 3 | JUMP [Type-A盤] | JUMP [Type-A Edition] | 31 March 2021 | GACD-0034 |
| 3 | JUMP [Type-B盤] | JUMP [Type-B Edition] | 31 March 2021 | GACD-0035 |

=== Live DVDs ===
| No. | Title | Title, unofficial English translation | Release date | Catalogue number |
|---|---|---|---|---|
| 1 | デスラビッツ 1st ワンマンライブ えみ・ゆず・かりんVS部長 @ club asia | DEATHRABBITS 1st ONE MAN LIVE Emi・Yuzu・Karin VS Bucho @ club Asia | 26 August 2015 | — |
| 2 | デスラビッツ2ndワンマンライブ えみ・ゆず・かりんvs部長 第二回戦@渋谷WOMB | DEATHRABBITS 2nd ONE MAN LIVE Emi・Yuzu・Karin vs Bucho Round 2 @ Shibuya WOMB | 24 February 2016 | GADD-0018 |
| 3 | デスラビッツ ワンマンライブ ～えみ・ゆず・かりん VS 部長～ 第3回戦 新宿ReNY 2DAYS | DEATHRABBITS 3rd ONE MAN LIVE ～ Emi・Yuzu・Karin VS Bucho ～ Round 3 Shinjuku ReNY 2DAYS | 12 October 2016 | GADD-0020 |
| 4 | デスラビッツ ラストライブw | DEATHRABBITS Last Live w | 22 February 2017 | GADD-0023 |
| 5 | です。ラビッツ 1st LIVE | DESU.RABBITS 1st LIVE | 20 September 2017 | GADD-0026 |
| 6 | DESURABBITS ONE-MAN LIVE 兎革命 vol.2 ～成蝶～ | DESURABBITS ONE-MAN LIVE Rabbit Revolution vol.2 ～Butterfly Metamorphosis～ | 7 December 2019 | GADD-0027 |

=== Music videos ===
| No. | Title | Title, rōmaji (unofficial English translation) | Published date | Official video |
|---|---|---|---|---|
| 1 | アイドル STAR WARS | Aidoru STAR WARS (Idol STAR WARS) | 1 November 2013 | YouTube |
| 2 | 恋する季節 | Koisuru kisetsu (The Season for Falling in Love) | 12 March 2014 | YouTube |
| 3 | デスラビッツ軍の七ケ条 | Desurabittsu-gun no nana kajou (7 Principles of the DEATHRABBITS Army) | 2 September 2014 | YouTube |
| 4 | うさぎのきもち | Usagi no kimochi (Feelings of the Rabbit) | 9 July 2015 | YouTube |
| 5 | なんで？ | Nande? (Why?) | 7 October 2015 | YouTube |
| 6 | 怪獣ANPONTAN | Kaiju ANPONTAN (Monster ANPONTAN) | 23 October 2015 | YouTube |
| 7 | うさぎストリーム2 | Usagi sutorimu 2 (Usagi Stream 2) | 15 April 2016 | YouTube |
| 8 | Anger | Anger (Anger) | 15 September 2016 | YouTube |
| 9 | ですまスプリング ～そろそろ敬語を使ってみませんか～ | Desuma supuringu ～Sorosoro keigo o tsukatte mimasenka～ (It's Spring ～Let's try using honorifics properly～) | 2 May 2017 | YouTube |
| 10 | みんなおいでよ！ですラビランド！〜アイドル界の闇〜 | Minna oideyo! Desurabirando! 〜Aidoru-kai no yami〜 (Come along everyone! Desurabi Land! 〜The darkness of the idol world〜) | 6 February 2018 | YouTube |
| 11 | 卒業少女-未来絵- | Sotsugyou shoujo -Mirai e- (Graduation Girl -Future Picture-) | 6 February 2019 | YouTube |
| 12 | Magic of Butterfly-成蝶- | Magic of Butterfly -Nari chou- (Magic of Butterfly -Metamorphosis-) | 9 July 2019 | YouTube |
| 13 | 一瞬で | Isshun de (In the blink of an eye) | 13 March 2020 | YouTube |
| 14 | 無視するな、君の色は君で決めればいい | Mushi suru na, kimi no iro wa kimi de kimereba ii (Don't ignore it, you can choose your colour) | 22 February 2021 | YouTube |

== 1 Ticket 4 Ramen ==
On 24 September 2017 the group held a live concert at the Shinjuku Blaze music venue in Tokyo in aid of the "1 Ticket 4 Ramen" project, a fundraising event to help feed deprived children in the Philippines by donating 4 packets of instant ramen noodles for every ticket purchased. The name of the project was inspired by the group's love of ramen, which lead to the creation of their limited edition with ramen (ラーメン付き) singles released between 2014 and 2018 that saw the CDs shipped in packets of instant ramen noodles. From the proceeds of the fundraiser, the group co-ordinated with a Philippines-based volunteer organisation to distribute 1,312 packets to children in Pandanon Island in central Visayas. During the trip Emi kept a video log of her time spent on the island, which also included a visit to a local elementary school where she performed songs for the students.

== Collaboration ==
The group has appeared in live performances with other Japanese idol groups including Ladybaby and Deadlift Lolita. In 2018 DESURABBITS and Deadlift Lolita launched a crowdfunding appeal to perform a live concert in Taiwan, which was successfully funded and took place at Jack's Studio in Taipei on 28 July 2018.
