= Karate (song) =

Single by Babymetal

from the album Metal Resistance
- Language: Japanese
- Released: February 26, 2016
- Genre: J-pop; nu metal; metalcore
- Length: 4:23
- Label: RAL; Sony Music
- Songwriter: Yuyoyuppe
- Producers: Kobametal; Yuppemetal (arrangement)

Babymetal singles chronology
"Gimme Chocolate!!" (2015)	"Karate" (2016)	"Distortion" (2018)

Music video
- "Karate" on YouTube

"Karate" (stylized in all caps) is a song by the Japanese heavy metal band Babymetal from their second studio album, Metal Resistance. The song was released to active rock radio as an airplay-only single in the United States on February 26, 2016.

== Background and release ==
"Karate" was first included in a teaser for the album Metal Resistance and its own music video, which was uploaded to YouTube on February 25, 2016. Currently, the official music video has gained over 77 million views on YouTube. The song was officially released as a digital single the next day, available as an instant download upon pre-ordering the album on the iTunes Store. Additionally, the song received airplay via the Nippon Broadcasting System program MC Plus.

Moa Kikuchi expressed that "Karate" is her favorite song, explaining how "karate has a courtesy: "Start with a bow and end with a bow." This is something important we value in our lives, because we never forget courtesy and a feeling of gratitude wherever we go."

== Composition ==
According to Suzuka Nakamoto, "Karate" is reminiscent of the song "Megitsune", which "is popular among international fans. [The song] has not only Babymetal vibes, but also has Japanese elements. Its lyrics portray a strong will to go on, no matter what happens in your life." The song is a nu metal song that contains elements of metalcore. Composed by Yuyoyuppe and arranged under the name Yuppemetal, "Karate" also features djent-like riffs, and a J-pop melody. Loudwire's Graham Hartmann described the song as "incredibly charming. Instrumentally, it’s also heavy as hell. The song’s main riff is way low on the sonic spectrum, chugging away in a no-nonsense djent fashion."

Kikuchi explained that the lyrics are about never giving up and always moving forward, no matter what difficulties need to be endured. Furthermore, Yui Mizuno described how the dance moves were made to help express the message of the song, as most of the lyrics were in Japanese.

== Reception ==
"Karate" received generally positive reviews from music critics. Lars Gotrich of NPR Music described the song as "catchy and grandiose" praising Nakamoto's vocal performance, comparing her to Evanescence lead vocalist Amy Lee. Jon Hadusek from Consequence of Sound called the song, as well as "From Dusk Till Dawn" essential tracks from the album. While reviewing Metal Resistance, Jordan Bassett of NME praised the song, describing it as "fast and furious until jangling, arpeggiated guitar alters the rhythm." Hartmann praised the song's chorus, calling it "one of the catchiest pieces [Babymetal] has crafted to date."

"Karate" peaked at number two on the Billboard World Digital Songs chart on the issue dated March 19, 2016, spending fourteen weeks on the chart. The song debuted at number 24 on the Billboard Japan Hot 100, for the week of March 12, 2016. After the release of the band's second album Metal Resistance, in the week of May 7, 2016, the song peaked at number 17, spending a total of twelve weeks on the chart.

On May 26, 2016, it was announced by WWE's Triple H on Twitter that the song, along with A Day to Remember's "Paranoia", would be used as one of the official theme songs of NXT TakeOver: The End.

== Music video ==
Directed by Daisuke Ninomiya, the music video for "Karate" was released on 18 March 2016.

Lars Gotrich of NPR Music described the video:

"Backed by a band now clad in deep purple and black warrior gear, the trio battles with martial arts masters and ghosts in white robes and studded face covers. After being briefly struck down, the three young women rise up together and hold up fox signs and pull them to their hearts. It's a tender moment, delivered with the ever-present wink."

Mizuno explained that the choreography shown in the video was inspired by the martial arts moves seen in karate, and was "one of the ways to kind of break the language barrier" due to the Japanese lyrics.

Nakamoto described the white figures in the video as representing their former selves, expressing the desire to break down barriers by fighting themselves to move forward. While working on the choreography for the song, the band members watched a variety of videos with karate, such The Karate Kid, adapting some of the moves into their dance.

Kikuchi added that "karate is obviously a form of martial arts that originated from Japan, so it’s something that she’s very proud of that they are now representing this culture that came from Japan through their music, and it’s a way for more people outside of Japan also to learn what karate is all about."

Gotrich praised the music video:

"Where past music videos have played up the presumed silliness of three Japanese girls flashing the fox sign and doing coordinated dance moves to heavy riffage, the stark and stylish visuals for "Karate" reflect a more dramatic tone."

The music video would later join the Loudwire Battle Royale Hall of Fame, after spending five straight weeks at number one based on fan votes.

== Live performances ==
"Karate" premiered at Yokohama Arena on December 12, 2015, during the final dates of the Babymetal World Tour 2015, and was added to the setlist of the Babymetal World Tour 2016, performed on the first tour date at Wembley Arena. The song had its first televised performance at TV Asahi's Music Station on April 22, 2016. The song's choreography contained interpolations of karate moves, as shown in the music video.

== Credits and personnel ==
- Suzuka Nakamoto (Su-metal) – vocals (lead)
- Yui Mizuno (Yuimetal) – vocals (lead and background)
- Moa Kikuchi (Moametal) – vocals (lead and background)
- Key Kobayashi (Kobametal) – producer
- Takehiro Mamiya (Yuyoyuppe / Yuppemetal) – lyrics, music, arrangement, mixing
- Adrian Breakspear – recording
- Watametal – recording
- Daisuke Ninomiya – music video director

== Chart performance ==
Chart (2016)	Peak position
Japan (Billboard)	17
US World Digital Songs (Billboard)	2

== Release history ==
Region	Date	Format	Label	Ref.
United States	February 26, 2016	Active rock	RAL; Sony Music Entertainment	
