= Kawaii metal =

Subgenre of heavy metal

- Etymology: Kawaii
- Other names: Idol metal; cute metal
- Stylistic origins: Heavy metal; hard rock; J-pop; bubblegum pop; EDM; extreme metal
- Cultural origins: Early 2010s, Japan

Subgenres
- Kawaiicore

Other topics
- Death growl; Japanese idol; alternative idol; kawaii; visual kei; pop metal

Kawaii metal (also known as cute metal, J-pop metal, or kawaiicore) is a musical genre that blends elements of heavy metal and J-pop that was pioneered in Japan in the early 2010s. The genre combines both Eastern and Western influences that appeal to both cultures. A typical kawaii metal composition combines the instrumentation found in various types of heavy metal music with J-pop melodies and a Japanese idol aesthetic. Kawaii metal's lyrical topics often contain kawaii (cute, lovable, kidlike) themes.

The Japanese girl group Babymetal is often credited with the creation and success of kawaii metal.

== History and characteristics ==
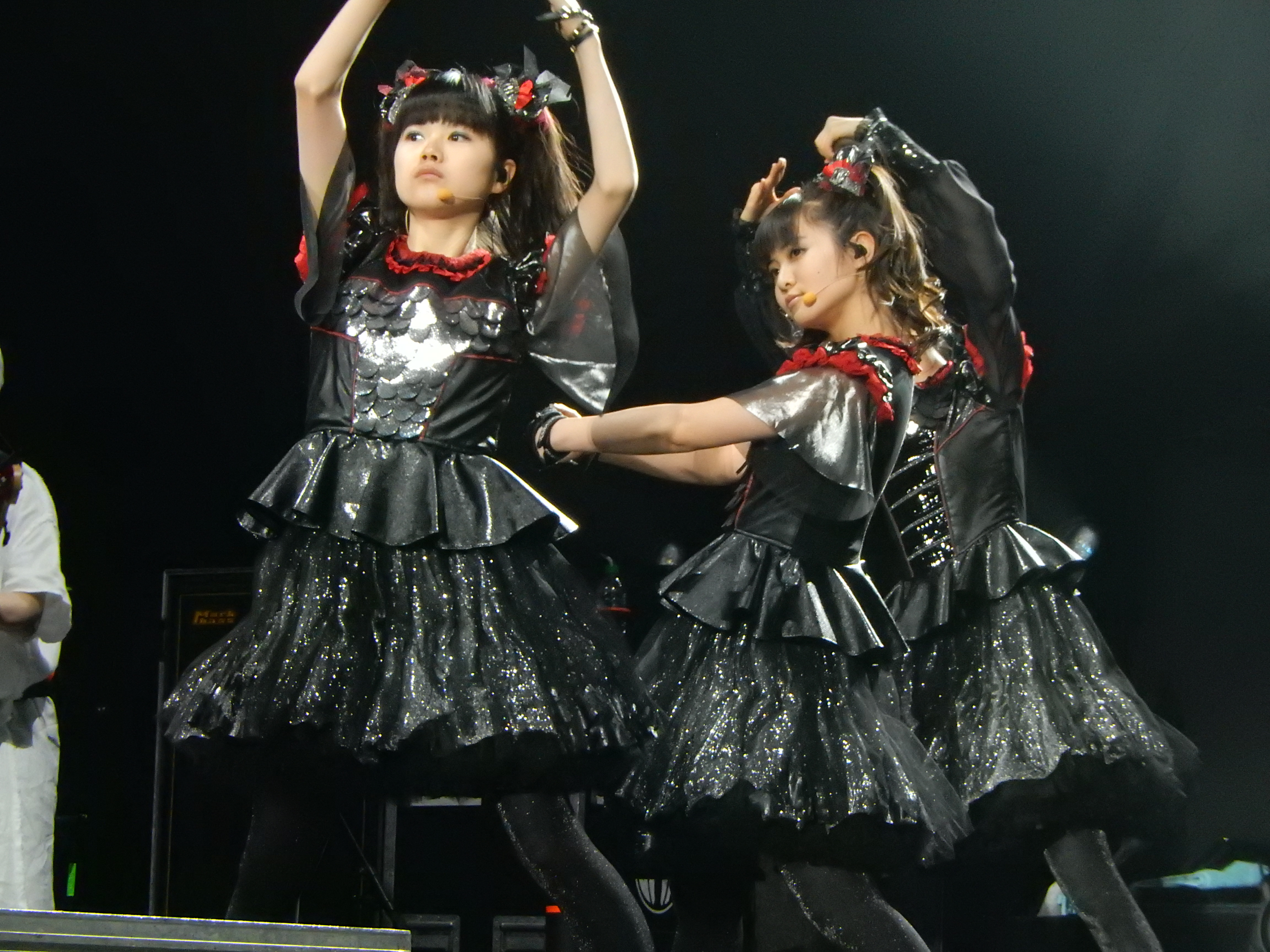
Kawaii metal pioneers Babymetal, performing in The O2 Arena London in 2016.

Japanese heavy metal idol group Babymetal are considered the inventors of the kawaii metal genre. The concept of kawaii metal started with Key “Kobametal” Kobayashi, the producer behind the group Babymetal. In an interview conducted by Billboard, Kobayashi explains that he was “just trying to do something no one had heard before”. Kawaii metal gained international popularity in 2014, when the group Babymetal uploaded a song to Youtube called "Gimme Chocolate!!" Angelica Wallingford of City Times opined that Babymetal's eponymous debut album had pioneered the kawaii metal musical genre. Wallingford also defined the genre, and album, as a "mixture of varying genres including pop, rock, heavy metal, electronic dance music, industrial and symphonic death metal". A guest contributor at The Independent believed that the genre was a derivative of J-pop and various extreme metal genres, namely "speed metal, power metal, black metal, and industrial metal".

While discussing Babymetal, The Sydney Morning Herald's Rob Nash stated that the genre consisted of "sugary pop melodies over thrash metal". Nash also believed that the group's song "Awadama Fever" exemplified the genre, with its "slabs of angry guitar and undanceably fast breakbeats, while the girls [Babymetal] squeak about 'bubble ball fever' and chewing gum".

Babymetal has remained extremely popular. In 2019, Babymetal became the first Asian artists to top Billboard’s Top Rock Albums chart, with their third studio album, Metal Galaxy. Murray Stassen in Music Week commented that "Babymetal is, without a doubt, a genuine cross-genre musical phenomenon" and that, despite how the juxtaposition of metal and J-pop might not seem to make sense on paper: "[Babymetal has] proved that it can, and does work, and resistance to the Babymetal phenomenon is futile."

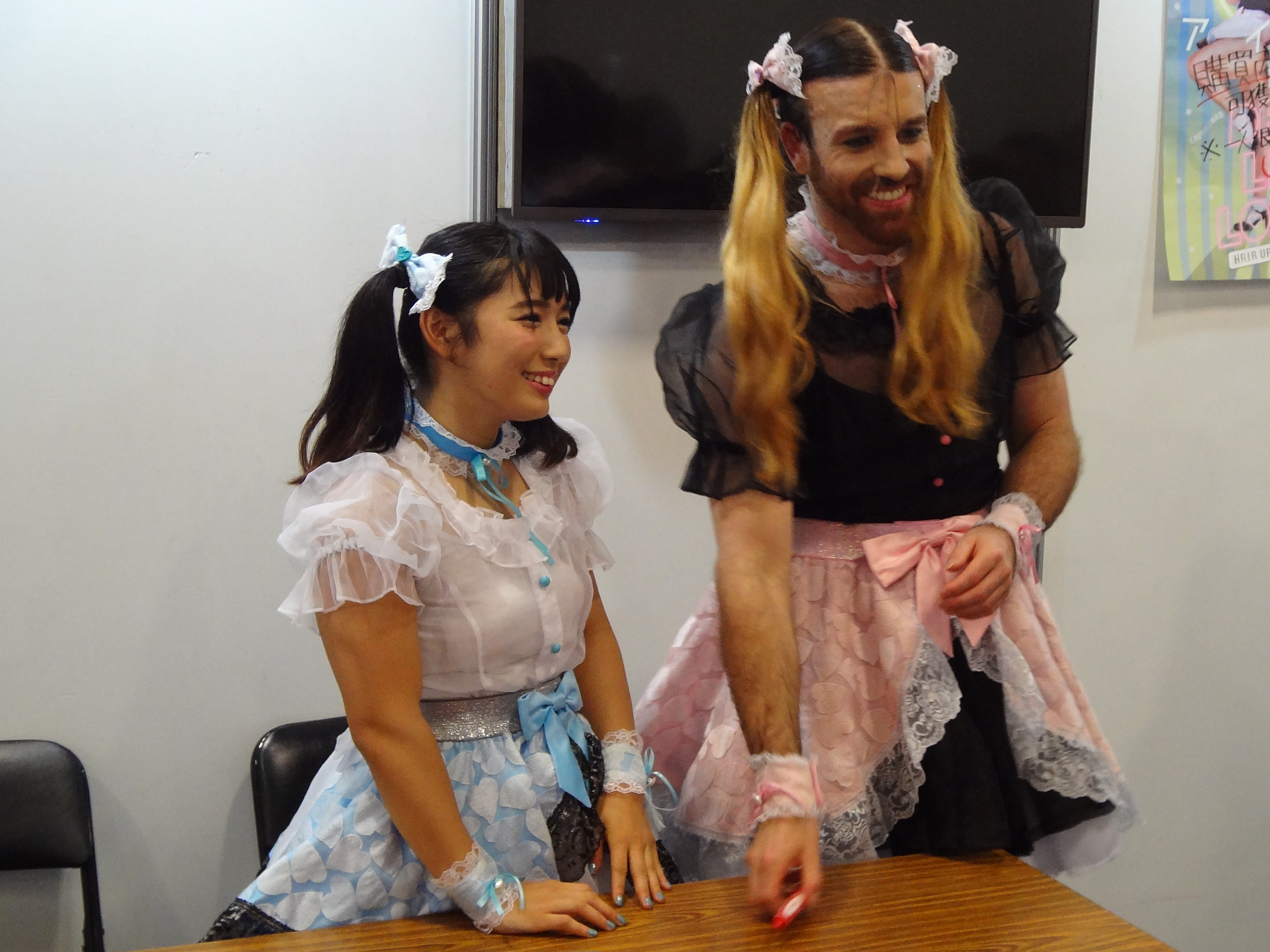
Kawaii metal band Deadlift Lolita in 2017.

Discussing Ladybeard, and Ladybaby, Jake Cleland of The Sydney Morning Herald defined the genre as "saccharine pop with his heavy metal growling". Alex Weiss of Paper defined the genre as "hard rock with sugary sweet pop hooks". Weiss also used Babymetal's songs "Karate" and "Road of Resistance" as examples to explain the differing lyrical perspective between the kawaii metal and other metal genres, stating that kawaii metal songs "offer a perspective often missing from the hyper-masculine, aggressive lyrics usually present in most of the [metal] genre's hits". Felix Clay of Cracked.com also believed that the genre had less aggressive lyricism, citing the genre had lyrics about "pop music topics like kittens, chocolate, and fun".

== See also ==
- List of kawaii metal musical groups
