= Doki Doki Morning =

"Doki Doki ☆ Morning"
- DVD and digital single cover. CD single has a black background.

Single by Babymetal

from the album Babymetal
- Language: Japanese; English
- Released: October 22, 2011
- Recorded: October 30, 2010
- Genre: J-pop; heavy metal; kawaii metal
- Length: 3:45
- Label: Juonbu
- Composers: Norizo; Motonari Murakawa
- Lyricist: Nakametal
- Producers: Kobametal; SOH (O! S-D) (arrangement); Murakawa (arrangement)

Babymetal singles chronology
"Doki Doki ☆ Morning" (2011)	"Babymetal / Kiba of Akiba" (2012)

Music video
- "Doki Doki ☆ Morning" on YouTube

"Doki Doki Morning" (ド・キ・ド・キ☆モーニング, Doki Doki Mōningu; lit. "Heart-Pounding Morning", stylized as "Doki Doki ☆ Morning" and formerly "Do・Ki・Do・Ki ☆ Morning") is a song by the Japanese heavy metal band Babymetal. The song was released in Japan as an independent DVD single on October 22, 2011, serving as the first single off the debut album Babymetal.

== Background and release ==
The song introduced all three members to heavy metal music; Nakamoto commenting how she had never heard such musical heaviness before, while Mizuno initially had more interest in dancing to the music rather than singing. During song production, the signature Kitsune hand gesture (similar to the sign of the horns) was formed. Vocals for the song were recorded on October 30, 2010. The song's first release was in the Sakura Gakuin album Sakura Gakuin 2010 Nendo: Message, released on April 27, 2011, as part of the Jūonbu ("heavy music club") sub-unit.

The song was later announced as a limited-edition DVD single on October 12, 2011, and later released also as a standard digital download available on October 22 and 23, 2011 for pre-sale at the Sakura Gakuin Festival 2011 held at Mt. Rainier Hall "Shibuya Pleasure Pleasure", and later sold in limited quantities on ASmart, Amazon, Tower Records Online, and Tower Records Shinjuku starting October 24. The limited edition included a DVD with the "Doki Doki ☆ Morning" music video and a cut of the original video focusing on the choreography for live performances of the song, and a towel embossed with either the logo of the band or the label Juonbu Records. The single was later released as a CD single on April 6, 2012, packaged with a T-shirt.

The song was later released as a promotional single in the United Kingdom on December 13, 2015.

== Composition ==
The song has a "modern heaviness" sound in its music, with dark, atmospheric instrumentals that reverse into a catchier and brighter melody with lyrics such as "Rin rin rin! Ohayō, wake up" (Ring ring ring! Good morning, wake up). Kikuchi noted how the tone of the song was directly opposite to Japanese kei-on music (light music); as a result, the band formed under the label Jūonbu (heavy music club) to signify the contrast. Nakamoto, whose vocals were recorded separately from those of Mizuno and Kikuchi, needed to speak quickly but clearly in the verses.

== Reception and legacy ==
The song managed to peak at number 80 on the Billboard Japan Top Independent Albums and Singles chart on the week dated November 7, 2011.

It was sampled in 2026 by @onefive for the song "Muteki Atashi Mōdo" (無敵☆アタシモード) with Babymetal producer Kobametal's permission.

== Music video ==
Directed by Shimon Tanaka, shooting for the video was completed by October 2011. According to Nakamoto, Tanaka had wanted to appear in the video, but found the choreography difficult to execute. The video was released in an abridged form to the Toy's Factory YouTube channel on October 12, 2011, with the full version posted on the official Babymetal channel over a year later, on November 8, 2012.

Metal Injection ranked the music video at number nine on the list of "The Top 15 Metal Viral Videos of the Year" on December 8, 2011.

== Live performances ==
The song premiered at the Sakura Gakuin concert Sakura Gakuin Festival 2010 at the Yokohama Red Brick Warehouse No. 1 on November 28, 2010. Regarding the group's first performance of the song, Su-metal explained, "What I remember clearly was during the interlude […] we all pretend to fall to the ground...I was afraid that people would just laugh at us and it would be embarrassing, but their reaction made me feel happy and at that time I thought this is who Su-metal is, this is what Babymetal is."

== Track listings and formats ==
DVD single

1. "Doki Doki ☆ Morning" (music video) (ド・キ・ド・キ☆モーニング -Music Clip-) – 3:53
2. "Doki Doki ☆ Morning" (Air Metal Dance ver.) – 4:04

Digital download

1. "Doki Doki ☆ Morning" (ド・キ・ド・キ☆モーニング) – 3:45

CD single

1. "Doki Doki ☆ Morning" (ド・キ・ド・キ☆モーニング) – 3:45
2. "Doki Doki ☆ Morning" (Air Vocal ver.) – 3:48

UK promotional single

1. "Doki Doki ☆ Morning" (album version) – 3:44
2. "Doki Doki ☆ Morning" (UK radio edit) – 3:32

== Credits and personnel ==
Credits adapted from album liner notes of Sakura Gakuin 2010 Nendo: Message and Babymetal.

- Suzuka Nakamoto (SU-METAL) – vocals (lead)
- Moa Kikuchi (MOAMETAL) – vocals (lead and background)
- Yui Mizuno (YUIMETAL) – vocals (lead and background)
- Millennium Japan (millennium-JAPAN) – producer
- SOH (O! S-D) – guitar, arrangement
- Norikazu Nakayama (ナカメタル) – lyrics, music
- Norizo (のりぞー) – music
- Motonari Murakawa (村カワ基成) – music, arrangement
- Seiji Toda (S.O.L.I.D sound lab) (戸田清章) – recording and audio mixing
- Yuji Nakamura (中村悠二) – assistant engineer

== Charts ==
Chart (2011)	Peak position
Japan Top Independent Albums and Singles (Billboard)	80

== Cover versions and usage in media ==
On March 4, 2012, the song was covered by fellow Sakura Gakuin members Marina Horiuchi, Ayaka Miyoshi, and Airi Matsui as a "Shuffle Unit" during the Sakura Gakuin concert Sakura Gakuin Hōkago Anthology at the Nihonbashi Mitsui Hall, where members of different sub-units would cover other sub-units' songs. On December 8, 2013, Hana Taguchi, Saki Ooga, and Aiko Yamaide covered the song as another "Shuffle Unit" in the concert Sakura Gakuin 3rd Anniversary: Live at the Amuse Musical Theater.

Kiba of Akiba covered the song on the joint single "Babymetal × Kiba of Akiba".

The song was used in the Taiwanese film Till We Meet Again, which was released in Japan in 2023.

== Release history ==
Region	Date	Format	Label
Japan	October 22, 2011	DVD; digital download	Juonbu Records
Worldwide	November 2, 2011	Digital download	Toy's Factory
Japan	April 6, 2012	CD	Juonbu Records
United Kingdom	December 13, 2015	CD	earMusic
