= Babymetal (album) =

Studio album by Babymetal
- Released: February 26, 2014
- Recorded: 2010–2014
- Genre: Kawaii metal
- Length: 54:55
- Language: Japanese
- Labels: BMD Fox; Toy's Factory; Amuse; earMUSIC; Cooking Vinyl
- Producers: Chibametal (exec.); Inabametal (exec.); Kobametal

Babymetal chronology
Babymetal (2014)	Live at Budokan: Red Night (2015)

Singles from Babymetal
- 1. "Doki Doki ☆ Morning" Released: October 22, 2011; 2. "Babymetal / Kiba of Akiba" Released: March 7, 2012; 3. "Headbangeeeeerrrrr!!!!!" Released: July 4, 2012; 4. "Ijime, Dame, Zettai" Released: January 9, 2013; 5. "Megitsune" Released: June 19, 2013; 6. "Gimme Chocolate!!" Released: May 31, 2015

Alternative cover
- Limited edition cover

Babymetal is the debut studio album by Japanese heavy metal group Babymetal. It was first released on February 26, 2014, in Japan through BMD Fox Records, and was re-released on May 29, 2015, in Europe through earMusic, and June 16, 2015, in the United States through RED Associated Labels (RAL) and Sony Music Entertainment. Music from the album dates back to the origins of the band in 2010, and incorporates tracks from their earliest released singles, back when the band was a sub-unit of the Japanese idol group Sakura Gakuin.

Babymetal received generally positive reviews from music critics. The album managed to peak at number four on the Oricon Weekly Chart, and has since been certified gold with over 100,000 copies sold in Japan. In the United States, the album debuted at number 187 on the Billboard 200—a rarity for Japanese acts in the country—and managed to top the World Albums chart. Two singles from Babymetal, "Ijime, Dame, Zettai" and "Megitsune", gained domestic success, charting within the top ten in Japan. "Gimme Chocolate!!" became an international success, with its music video garnering attention overseas and becoming the group's most viewed music video on YouTube.

== Background ==
Prior to the album's release, Babymetal performed as a sub-unit for the Japanese idol group Sakura Gakuin from 2010 to 2013, and music that would be included surfaced as early as October 30, 2010, when the members of the band recorded their vocals for their first song "Doki Doki ☆ Morning". From 2011 to 2013, the band released five singles inside and outside Sakura Gakuin, with the most successful single, "Ijime, Dame, Zettai" peaking at number six on the Oricon Weekly Singles chart.

From late 2012 to early 2013, Babymetal took part in a series of headlining shows, performing new songs in each performance. The band then embarked on their first tour, the Babymetal Death Match Tour 2013: May Revolution, in May 2013, and later performed two more headlining shows that year, each performed near the members' birthdays. At the end of the latter show, Legend "1997", the band announced a pair of shows to occur at Nippon Budokan, as well as an album slated for release on February 26, 2014, with a standard edition and a limited edition bundled with a DVD.

== Composition ==
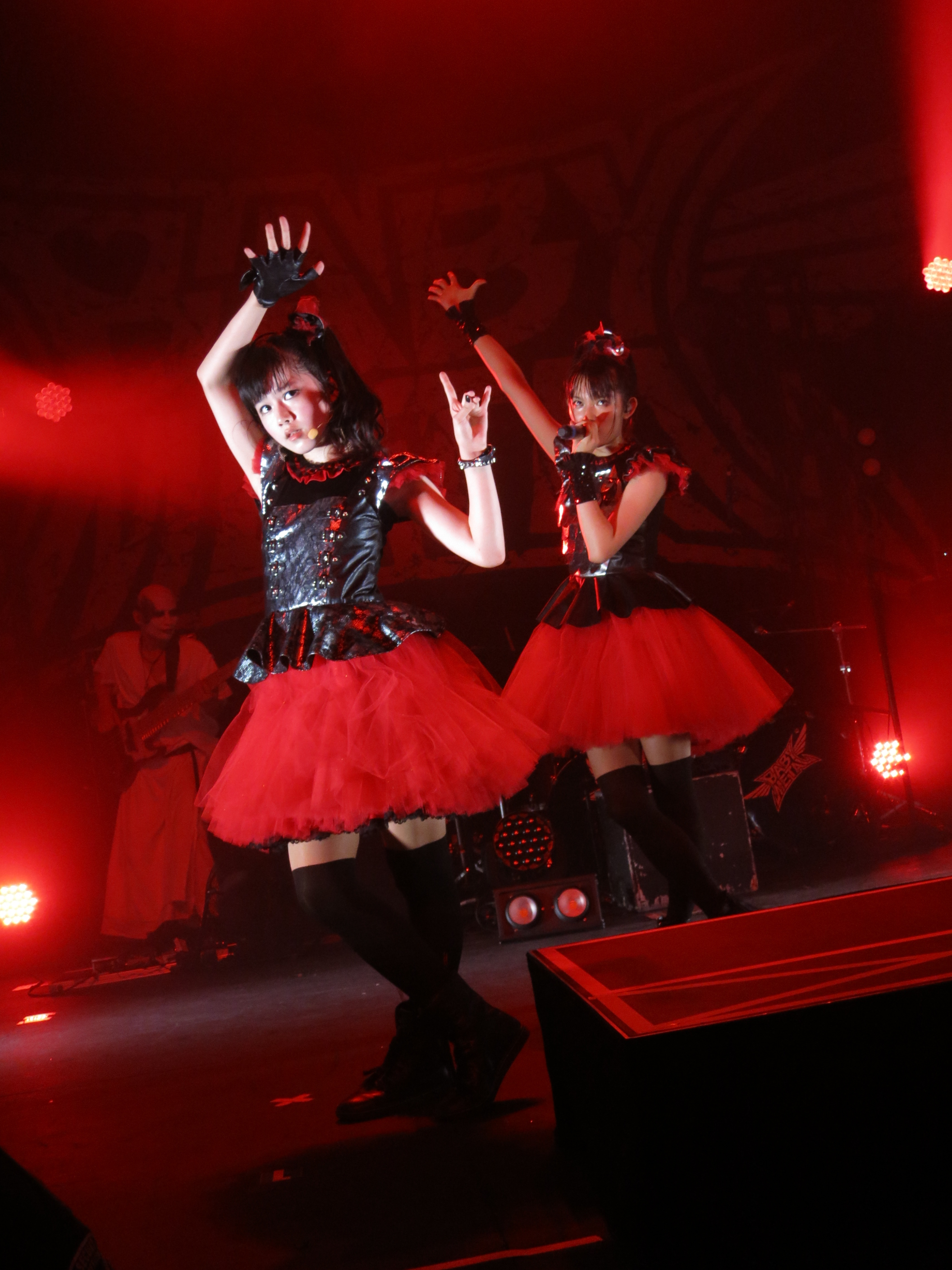
Babymetal performing "Megitsune" on the Babymetal World Tour 2014. The song talks about not underestimating women who hide their emotions.

Musically, the album follows Babymetal's fusion of J-pop and heavy metal (referred to as kawaii metal), at times incorporating elements of bubblegum pop, hip-hop, drum and bass, and dubstep. The opening track "Babymetal Death" is an instrumental speed metal track, with frequent shouts of "Death!", while "Gimme Chocolate!!" features "thrashing, grating guitars" that alternate with "speed-sung, quirky lyrics". Songs like "Megitsune" and "Iine!" are notable for their sudden genre shifts, while the Su-metal solo "Rondo of Nightmare" is described as a powerful cacophony. The Black Babymetal song "Song 4" incorporates elements of reggae, while "Catch Me If You Can" contains elements of "digi-rock" (digital rock) and industrial metal. "Ijime, Dame, Zettai" begins with a mellow intro transitioning to speed metal.

Lyrically, the songs of the album are in Japanese, and focus on issues for young girls, like acceptance and standing up for one's self. "Megitsune" is about women who hide their emotions like a kitsune (fox), which serves as the band's signature hand gesture. "Gimme Chocolate!" talks about girls who like to eat chocolate, while dealing with the worry of weight gain, while "Iine!" emphazises the band's desire "to establish a fun, aggressive, new genre in music". "Doki Doki ☆ Morning" and "Uki Uki ★ Midnight" are described as two sides of a day, and as such describe the contrasting times of a girl's life. "Catch Me If You Can" has a more comical theme of hide and seek with concepts of Japanese namahage. "Headbangeeeeerrrrr!!!!!" tells the story of a girl's first experience at a concert, while "Ijime, Dame, Zettai" is an anti-bullying theme.

According to Nakamoto, the meanings behind lyrics of the songs did not immediately become recognized by the members of the band, but this would later be mitigated after performing the tracks live in concert. After the album gained international attention, Nakamoto has mentioned how a girl from the United Kingdom sent a letter about how "Ijime, Dame, Zettai" helped her deal with school bullies, and further said,

"Despite the fact that we sing in Japanese, so many people around the world have reached out to us and that encourages us to keep doing what we are doing right now. We are definitely happy that we've been able to help our fans in any way we can."

== Release and promotion ==
On January 25, 2014, the title was confirmed, and the track listing revealed three new songs and ten found on the band's previous singles. On February 4, 2014, the artwork was revealed for both editions, and a promotional video featuring five songs from the album was posted on YouTube, along with a teaser for a live music clip of "Gimme Chocolate!!". To commemorate the release day of the album, Tower Records Shinjuku sold "Festival of 25" merchandise, with the store ultimately selling over 1,000 copies. The album was also released in a special limited edition titled Babymetal Apocalypse Limited Edition, exclusively for members of the group's "Babymetal Apocalypse Web" fansite, and in a CD format with alternate versions of two of the songs.

On July 26, 2014, the band re-released the limited-edition version with a special cover to commemorate the band's 2014 world tour. In mid-2015, the album was re-released worldwide under different record labels with two bonus tracks: the new song "Road of Resistance" and a live performance of "Gimme Chocolate!!" from O2 Academy Brixton. When asked about the re-release, Nakamoto explained,

"Obviously, we don't come to America often. It's very difficult, you know, schedule-wise and everything. With this album finally being physically available here, I feel that, hopefully, the album will be the medium that keeps the fans close to us. They will finally be able to hold it in their hands. Even though we're so far away, this album's going to connect us with fans again and we just want to keep that relationship going."

=== Tour ===
Shortly after the release of the album, the band performed two shows at Nippon Budokan to a sold out audience, where they performed all songs from the album with their accompanying band, Kami Band. After the end of the second show, the band announced two shows to be performed later in the year in Europe, which was later revealed to be a part of the band's first world tour, the Babymetal World Tour 2014. In 2015, the band embarked on the Babymetal World Tour 2015, with more tour dates in North America and Europe.

=== Singles and other songs ===
Prior to the release of the album, Babymetal had released five singles, from 2011 to 2013. The first single, "Doki Doki ☆ Morning", initially appeared on the Sakura Gakuin debut album Sakura Gakuin 2010 Nendo: Message, before being released independently on October 22, 2011. "Babymetal / Kiba of Akiba", a joint single with the band Kiba of Akiba, was released on March 7, 2012, featuring the Babymetal song "Iine!". "Headbangeeeeerrrrr!!!!!" was released on July 4, 2012 and included a neck corset on the limited editions. "Ijime, Dame, Zettai" was the first major label single released on January 7, 2013, but did not appear in the annually released Sakura Gakuin albums. "Megitsune" was released as the second major label single on June 19, 2013, and is the first song released after the split from Sakura Gakuin.

Prior to the international release of the album, a sixth single, "Road of Resistance", was released digitally on February 1, 2015. "Gimme Chocolate!!", although not initially released as a single, brought the band and the album to international success; the song peaked at number 5 on the Billboard World Digital Songs chart in the United States and its live music video performance at the concert Legend "1997" Su-metal Seitansai has garnered over 100 million views as of July 4, 2019. The song was later released as a digital single by earMusic on May 31, 2015.

== Reception ==
=== Critical reception ===
Professional ratings
Review scores
Source	Rating
AllMusic	4.5/5 stars
CD Journal	Positive
The Japan Times	Positive
Kerrang!	4/5 stars
Music Magazine	8/10 stars
Music Magazine Japan	Positive
Rock Sound	4/5 stars
Rolling Stone Japan	4.5/5 stars
Rossiyskaya Gazeta	Positive
What's In?	Positive

Babymetal received acclaim from Japanese critics. Kazumi Nanba from Rolling Stone Japan positively reviewed the album, calling "Song 4" a highlight and calling the work filled with elements of "quality, heaviness, humor, and cuteness", and a unified masterpiece that can no doubt be representative of the year 2014. Patrick St. Michel of The Japan Times described the album as a "less cynical, more pop friendly version of Maximum the Hormone’s last album, Yoshu Fukushu, and credited the band members and musicians for a "solid album", and noted that the album was most successful when the band "ditches the gimmicks", calling "Gimme Chocolate!!" "extremely catchy".

The album also received positive reception internationally. Tim Sendra from AllMusic gave the album four and a half stars out of five stating: "It's clearly not an album for metalheads who like to follow the clear definitions of what makes metal metal, or one for J-pop fans who are scared of huge guitar riffs. But those who don't really care about rules and just want to jump around like idiots to the brightest, silliest music imaginable will find exactly what they never dreamed about asking for in Babymetal's brilliant debut." Sarah O'Connor from Rock Sound wrote that the album was "oodles of fun" and "completely and utterly absurd, but when has that ever been a bad thing?" Paul Travers of Kerrang! called the music "cynical and fabricated", yet "utterly brilliant". Recommending the songs, "Headbangeeeeerrrrr!!!!!" and "Catch Me If You Can", he stated that the band is using the "fine line between genius and insanity […] as a skipping rope". Tristan Peterson from Metal Obsession stated, "This band was created for the demographic of “Music that your Japanese Boyfriend/Girlfriend, who doesn’t really like Metal, would enjoy.” He continued saying, "This is a unique album from a unique band that has not compromised on their intent, and that is to create a charming, and pretty damn heavy, dichotomy of sound for you to enjoy. It has made metal cute without losing any of its edge and that is not something you can say about, well, any band." The album also received attention from western journalists like Brian Mansfield of USA Today.

=== Accolades ===
In July 2016, Metal Hammer readers voted Babymetal as the best album of the 21st century. In December 2014, PopMatters called it the fourteenth best metal album of 2014. In November 2019, Loudwire called it the forty-first best metal album of the decade.

=== Commercial performance ===
Babymetal peaked at number four on the Oricon Weekly Albums chart for the week of March 10, 2014 with first-week sales of 37,463 copies, and number one on the Oricon Daily Albums chart on March 1, 2014. The album also peaked at number two on the Billboard Japan Top Albums Sales chart, with first-week sales of 31,000 copies. In the United States, the album peaked at number 187 on the Billboard 200 for the week of March 22, 2014, and number four on the Billboard Heatseekers chart. In the United Kingdom, the album peaked at number 103 on the Official Albums Chart. Additionally, the album peaked at number 35 on the US iTunes album chart, and at number one on the iTunes metal charts in the United States, Canada, and the United Kingdom.

In December 2014, Babymetal was certified Gold by the Recording Industry Association of Japan for more than 100,000 physical copies shipped to stores.

== Track listing ==
No.	Title	Lyrics	Music	Arrangement	Length
1.	"Babymetal Death"	Kitsune of Metal God^{[a]}	Kitsune of Metal God^{[a]}	Yuyoyuppe	5:46
2.	"Megitsune" (メギツネ)	Mk-metal; Norimetal	Norimetal	Yuyoyuppe	4:07
3.	"Gimme Chocolate!!" (ギミチョコ！！)	Mk-metal; Kxbxmetal	Takeshi Ueda	Ueda	3:50
4.	"Iine!" (いいね！)	Nakata Caos (中田カオス)	Mish-Mosh	Daiki Kasho	4:08
5.	"Akatsuki" (紅月 -アカツキ-)	Nakametal; Tsubometal	Tsubometal	Kyoto (教頭)	5:25
6.	"Doki Doki ☆ Morning" (ド・キ・ド・キ☆モーニング)	Nakametal^{[b]}	Norizō (のりぞー); Motonari Murakawa (村カワ基成)	SOH (Oh! S-D); Murakawa	3:44
7.	"Onedari Daisakusen" (おねだり大作戦)	Nakata Caos; Ryu-metal; Fuji-metal	Team-K	Tatsuo; Kxbxmetal	3:15
8.	"Song 4" (4の歌 Yon no Uta)	Black Babymetal^{[c]}	Black Babymetal^{[c]}	Tatsuo; Kxbxmetal	4:01
9.	"Uki Uki ★ Midnight" (ウ・キ・ウ・キ★ミッドナイト)	Ryu-metal; Fuji-metal; Nakata Caos	Team-K	Yuyoyuppe	3:17
10.	"Catch Me If You Can"	Edometal	Narasaki	Narametal	3:53
11.	"Rondo of Nightmare" (悪夢の輪舞曲(ロンド) Akumu no Rondo)	Yuyoyuppe	Yuyoyuppe	Yuyoyuppe	3:33
12.	"Headbangeeeeerrrrr!!!!!" (ヘドバンギャー！！)	Edometal (江戸メタル); Nakametal^{[b]}	Narasaki	Narametal	3:59
13.	"Ijime, Dame, Zettai" (イジメ、ダメ、ゼッタイ)	Nakametal; Tsubometal	Kxbxmetal; Tsubometal; Takemetal	Kyoto	6:04
Total length:					54:55

International bonus tracks
No.	Title	Lyrics	Music	Arrangement	Length
14.	"Road of Resistance"	Kitsune of Metal God^{[a]}; Mk-metal; Kxbxmetal	Mish-Mosh; Norimetal; Kyt-metal	Kyoto	5:20
15.	"Gimme Chocolate!!" (live at O2 Academy Brixton, London)	Mk-metal; Kxbxmetal	Ueda	Ueda	5:04
Total length:					65:19

Babymetal Apocalypse Limited Edition
No.	Title	Lyrics	Music	Arrangement	Length
1.	"Babymetal Death"	Kitsune of Metal God^{[a]}	Kitsune of Metal God^{[a]}	Yuyoyuppe	5:48
2.	"Megitsune" (メギツネ)	Mk-metal; Norimetal	Norimetal	Yuyoyuppe	4:09
3.	"Gimme Chocolate!!" (ギミチョコ！！)	Mk-metal; Kxbxmetal	Ueda	Ueda	3:53
4.	"Iine!" (いいね！)	Nakata Caos	Mish-Mosh	Kasho	4:10
5.	"Akatsuki" (Unfinished Ver.) (紅月 -アカツキ-（Unfinished ver.）)	Nakametal; Tsubometal	Tsubometal	Kyoto	3:55
6.	"Doki Doki ☆ Morning" (ド・キ・ド・キ☆モーニング)	Nakametal^{[b]}	Norizō; Murakawa	SOH; Murakawa	3:45
7.	"Onedari Daisakusen" (おねだり大作戦)	Nakata Caos; Ryu-metal; Fuji-metal	Team-K	Tatsuo; Kxbxmetal	3:17
8.	"Song 4" (444 Ver.) (4の歌（444 ver.）)	Black Babymetal^{[c]}	Black Babymetal^{[c]}	Tatsuo; Kxbxmetal	4:04
9.	"Uki Uki ★ Midnight" (ウ・キ・ウ・キ★ミッドナイト)	Ryu-metal; Fuji-metal; Nakata Caos	Team-K	Yuyoyuppe	3:20
10.	"Catch Me If You Can"	Edometal	Narasaki	Narametal	3:57
11.	"Rondo of Nightmare" (悪夢の輪舞曲)	Yuyoyuppe	Yuyoyuppe	Yuyoyuppe	3:37
12.	"Headbangeeeeerrrrr!!!!!" (ヘドバンギャー！！)	Edometal; Nakametal^{[b]}	Narasaki	Narametal	4:02
13.	"Ijime, Dame, Zettai" (イジメ、ダメ、ゼッタイ)	Nakametal; Tsubometal	Kxbxmetal; Tsubometal; Takemetal	Kyoto	6:06
Total length:					53:58

Limited edition DVD
No.	Title	Length
1.	"Doki Doki ☆ Morning" (music video)	3:54
2.	"Iine!" (music video)	4:16
3.	"Headbangeeeeerrrrr!!!!!" (music video)	4:54
4.	"Ijime, Dame, Zettai" (music video)	6:10
5.	"Megitsune" (music video)	4:11
6.	"Gimme Chocolate!!" (from Legend "1997" Su-metal Seitansai at Makuhari Messe Event Hall, 12/21/2013) (live music clip)	4:04
Total length:		27:26

Japanese limited edition DVD – Live from Summer Sonic 2013
No.	Title	Length
7.	"Babymetal Death"	6:01
8.	"Megitsune"	4:27
9.	"Catch Me If You Can"	4:50
10.	"Headbangeeeeerrrrr!!!!!"	5:06
11.	"Ijime, Dame, Zettai"	8:10
Total length:		56:03

"Nippon Budokan Exclusive Special Set!!" limited edition DVD
No.	Title	Length
1.	"History of Babymetal"	31:54
Total length:		31:54

"Visiting Japan Commemoration" limited edition DVD
No.	Title	Length
1.	"Gimme Chocolate!!" (World Tour 2015 edition)	5:17
Total length:		5:17

Notes

- ^{^[a]}"Kitsune of Metal God" refers to a god figure frequently mentioned in band materials and interviews (often as "Kitsune-sama" or the "Fox God"). Official credits under this name are registered to Kobametal.
- ^{^[b]}Nakametal is written as ナカメタル in the credits of "Doki Doki ☆ Morning" and "Headbangeeeeerrrrr!!!!!".
- ^{^[c]}Black Babymetal refers to the stage name for the duo of Yuimetal and Moametal without Su-metal.
- "Babymetal Death" is stylized in all caps.
- "Catch Me If You Can" is stylized as "Catch me if you can" on the Japanese edition.
- Herman Li and Sam Totman appear on "Road of Resistance", and are featured artists on the United Kingdom digital release.
- Commentary audio tracks are included for music videos on the Japanese limited edition DVD.
- "Gimme Chocolate!!" (World Tour 2015 edition) includes highlights of the Babymetal World Tour 2015.

== Personnel ==
Credits adapted from Babymetal album liner notes, Sakura Gakuin 2010 Nendo: Message album liner notes, "Babymetal / Kiba of Akiba" single cover notes, "Headbangeeeeerrrrr!!!!!" single liner notes, "Ijime, Dame, Zettai" standard and limited "I" single liner notes, "Megitsune" standard and limited "Tsu" single liner notes, Metal Resistance liner notes, and Google Play.

Recording and management

- Recorded at S.O.L.I.D. Sound Lab, Heartbeat Recording Studio, MukuStudio, Sound Arts Studio, Wacken Open Studio, and ABS Recording
- Mixed at S.O.L.I.D. Sound Lab, Heartbeat Recording Studio, Art Pop Entertainment, Hama Shobo Studio (濱書房スタジオ), and King Sekiguchidai Studio
- Mastered at Form the Master and Parasight Mastering

Personnel

- Suzuka Nakamoto (Su-metal) – vocals
- Yui Mizuno (Yuimetal) – vocals, lyrics, music
- Moa Kikuchi (Moametal) – vocals, lyrics, music
- Key Kobayashi (Kobametal / Kxbxmetal / Kitsune of Metal God) – lead producer, management, lyrics, music, arrangement
- Millennium Japan – producer
- Miki Watanabe (Mk-metal) – lyrics
- Norikazu Nakayama (Norimetal / Nakata Caos / Nakametal / Norizo) – lyrics, music
- Tatsuya Tsubono (Tsubometal) – lyrics, music
- Ryuji Yokoi (Ryu-metal, Team-K) – lyrics, music
- Shinichi Fujita (Fuji-metal, Team-K) – lyrics, music
- Shion Hirota (Edometal) – lyrics
- Takehiro Mamiya (Yuyoyuppe) – lyrics, production, samples, arrangement, programming, sound design, field recording, guitar, audio mixing
- Takeshi Ueda – music, arrangement
- Nobuaki Miyasaka (Mish-Mosh) – music
- Sari Miyasaka (Mish-Mosh) – music
- Motonari Murakawa – music, arrangement
- Shuhei Takahashi (Team-K) – music
- Kazuki Higashihara (Team-K) – music
- Rie Tsujimoto (Team-K) – music
- Nobuki Narasaki (Narametal) – music, arrangement
- Takeru Youda (Takemetal) – music
- Keiji Kusama (Kyt-metal) – music
- Daiki Kasho – arrangement, audio engineer
- Kyoto – arrangement
- SOH (O! S-D) – arrangement, guitar
- Tatsuo Konno – arrangement, programming, guitar, bass
- Herman Li – guitar
- Sam Totman – guitar
- Leda – bass

Production

- Chibametal – executive producer
- Inabametal – executive producer
- Takehiro Mamiya – co-producer
- Hitometal – management
- Seiji Toda – recording, audio mixing
- Masatake Osato – recording
- Naoki Ibaraki – recording
- Hironobu Takikawa – audio mixing
- Yasuhisa Kataoka – audio engineer
- Motohiro Tsuji – mastering
- Tucky – mastering
- Yuji Nakamura – assistant engineer
- Shimon Tanaka – art direction, illustration, design
- Yoko Nakajima (SMC) – art work coordination
- Derametal – A&R director
- Akimetal – A&R promotion
- Tackmetal – sales promotion

== Charts ==
=== Weekly charts ===
Weekly chart performance for Babymetal
Chart (2014–15)	Peak position
Austrian Albums (Ö3 Austria)	69
Belgian Albums (Ultratop Flanders)	181
Dutch Albums (Album Top 100)	90
German Albums (Offizielle Top 100)	95
Japanese Albums (Oricon)	4
Japanese Albums (Billboard)	2
Scottish Albums (OCC)	91
UK Albums (OCC)	103
UK Album Sales (OCC)	86
UK Independent Albums Breakers (OCC)	7
UK Rock & Metal Albums (OCC)	7
US Billboard 200	187
US Heatseekers Albums (Billboard)	4
US Top Rock Albums (Billboard)	50
US Hard Rock Albums (Billboard)	12
US World Albums (Billboard)	1
US Independent Albums (Billboard)	32

=== Year-end charts ===
Year-end chart performance for Babymetal
Chart (2014)	Position
Japanese Albums (Oricon)	52
Japanese Albums (Billboard Japan)	57
US World Albums (Billboard)	7

Chart (2015)	Position
Japanese Albums (Billboard Japan)	76
US World Albums (Billboard)	5

Chart (2016)	Position
Japanese Albums (Billboard Japan)	58

== Certifications ==
Certifications for Babymetal
Region	Certification	Certified units/sales
Japan (RIAJ)	Gold	100,000^{^}
^{^} Shipments figures based on certification alone.

== Release history ==
Region	Date	Format	Label	Edition(s)	Catalog	Ref.
Worldwide	February 26, 2014	Digital download	Amuse, Inc.	Standard	—N/a	
Japan	February 26, 2014	CD; digital download; CD, DVD	BMD Fox Records; Toy's Factory; Amuse, Inc.	Standard; limited	TFCC-86461; TFCC-86460	
Japan	February 26, 2014	CD	BMD Fox Records; Toy's Factory; Amuse, Inc.	Babymetal Apocalypse Limited Edition	PPTF-8058	
Japan	March 1, 2014	Digital download, DVD	BMD Fox Records; Toy's Factory; Amuse, Inc.	Nippon Budokan Exclusive Special Set!!	TFXQ-78112	
Japan	July 26, 2014	CD, DVD	BMD Fox Records; Toy's Factory; Amuse, Inc.	Limited (re-release)	TFCC-86460	
Finland	May 29, 2015	CD; digital download; CD, DVD	earMusic	International; limited international	EMU02103957; EMU02104001	
Germany	May 29, 2015	CD; digital download; CD, DVD	earMusic	International; limited international	EMU02103957; EMU02104001	
Spain	May 29, 2015	CD; digital download; CD, DVD	earMusic	International; limited international	EMU02103957; EMU02104001	
Sweden	May 29, 2015	CD; digital download; CD, DVD	earMusic	International; limited international	EMU02103957; EMU02104001	
Belgium	June 1, 2015	CD; digital download; CD, DVD	earMusic	International; limited international	EMU02103957; EMU02104001	
Denmark	June 1, 2015	CD; digital download; CD, DVD	earMusic	International; limited international	EMU02103957; EMU02104001	
France	June 1, 2015	CD; digital download; CD, DVD	earMusic	International; limited international	EMU02103957; EMU02104001	
Netherlands	June 1, 2015	CD; digital download; CD, DVD	earMusic	International; limited international	EMU02103957; EMU02104001	
Norway	June 1, 2015	CD; digital download; CD, DVD	earMusic	International; limited international	EMU02103957; EMU02104001	
Poland	June 1, 2015	CD; digital download; CD, DVD	earMusic	International; limited international	EMU02103957; EMU02104001	
Switzerland	June 1, 2015	CD; digital download; CD, DVD	earMusic	International; limited international	EMU02103957; EMU02104001	
United Kingdom	June 1, 2015	CD; digital download; CD, DVD	earMusic	International; limited international	EMU02103957; EMU02104001	
Italy	June 2, 2015	CD; digital download; CD, DVD	earMusic	International; limited international	EMU02103957; EMU02104001	
United States	June 16, 2015	CD; digital download	RAL; Sony Music Entertainment	International	RAL0096922	
Japan	June 17, 2015	LP	BMD Fox Records; Toy's Factory; Amuse, Inc.	Standard	TFJC-38024	
United States	January 15, 2016	LP	RAL; Sony Music Entertainment	Standard	RAL0509692	
Japan	September 14, 2016	CD, DVD	BMD Fox Records; Toy's Factory; Amuse, Inc.	Visiting Japan Commemoration	TFCC-86571	
