= Babymetal / Kiba of Akiba =

Single by Babymetal and Kiba of Akiba

from the album Babymetal and Yeniol and Sakura Gakuin 2011 Nendo: Friends
- Language: Japanese; English
- Released: March 7, 2012
- Length: 4:10 ("Iine!"); 3:42 ("Party @the BBS")
- Label: Juonbu
- Composers: Mish-Mosh ("Iine!"); Kiba of Akiba ("Party @the BBS")
- Lyricists: Nakata Caos ("Iine!"); Kiba of Akiba ("Party @the BBS")
- Producers: Kobametal; Daiki Kasho (arrangement) ("Iine!"); Kiba of Akiba ("Party @the BBS")

Babymetal singles chronology
"Doki Doki ☆ Morning" (2011)	"Babymetal / Kiba of Akiba" (2012)	"Headbangeeeeerrrrr!!!!!" (2012)

Kiba of Akiba singles chronology
"Otailish Can Badge" (2011)	"Babymetal / Kiba of Akiba" (2012)	"Zenbu Uchū ga Warui" (2012)

Music video
- "Iine!" on YouTube "Party @the BBS" on YouTube

"Babymetal / Kiba of Akiba" (BABYMETAL×キバオブアキバ, BABYMETAL to Kiba obu Akiba; "Babymetal and Kiba of Akiba") is a joint single by Japanese heavy metal band Babymetal and otailish death pop band Kiba of Akiba. The single was first released in Japan on March 7, 2012 to promote the album Sakura Gakuin 2011 Nendo: Friends.

== Release ==
Babymetal and Kiba of Akiba first met under the management of the main group Sakura Gakuin, and later, decided on a collaboration. The split single was announced on February 9, 2012 for release on March 7, 2012, and was the fifth overall single released to promote Sakura Gakuin 2011 Nendo: Friends.

The single contains two original songs, one performed by Babymetal and one by Kiba of Akiba, and two bonus tracks. The first bonus track, "Kimi to Anime Ga Mitai – Answer for Animation with You" is a cover of the Kiba of Akiba song "Animation with You", as performed by Babymetal. The second bonus track is a remix of the Babymetal song "Doki Doki ☆ Morning", as performed by Kiba of Akiba. The single artwork depicts a fox who has grown fangs (the former is motif for Babymetal, while the latter is a motif for Kiba of Akiba) holding up a kitsune sign with Akihabara in the background.

On April 6, 2012, Babymetal performed at Tower Records Japan in Shibuya to commemorate the release of the single.

== "Iine!" ==
=== Background ===
"Iine!" (いいね!; "Isn't it good!") was first released as the band's second song as a subgroup of Sakura Gakuin, and the fifth single overall from the album Sakura Gakuin 2011 Nendo: Friends, from which a remix of the song, "Iine!" (Vega Mix ver.), was featured. The song was first teased in the video Babymetal: My First Heavy Metal in Tokyo 2012 uploaded to YouTube on February 1, 2012, along with a short demo of "Ijime, Dame, Zettai".

The band premiered the song at the concert "Woman's Power 20th Anniversary" at Shibuya O-West on January 9, 2012. "Iine!" later served as the second single for their debut album Babymetal.

=== Composition of "Iine!" ===
According to Blabbermouth.net, "Iine!" "combines pop with extreme metal guitars, an occasional growl or two and a tinge of hip hop". Brad Nelson of The Guardian compared the breakdown in "Iine!" to the works of Lex Luger, "down to the nervy, rattling snares". Japanese music portal Barks described the song with an edgy sound in the beginning as the electronica/screamo style, electronicore (known in Japan as "pikorimo"). The breakdown contains elements of hip hop, then a combination of death metal sounds and screamo. The screams, "It's not the sign of the horns, it's a kitsune sign" refer to the three members initially mistaking the former for the head of a fox.

Suzuka Nakamoto stated that the song expressed the band's desire to establish a fun, aggressive, new genre in music, and challenged them to rap. She has also stated: "I have an impression that many American fans are fond of dance music tunes like "Iine!" Overall, the response from American audiences during our shows is so real." She further explained that the choreography at the chorus is easy, allowing the audience to build hype with the band, with sudden shouts just before the climax.

=== "Iine!" music video ===
The music video for "Iine!", directed by Daishinszk, was uploaded in part to the Toy's Factory YouTube channel on February 24, 2012, while the full video was uploaded to the official Babymetal channel on November 8, 2012. The video features a variation of para-para style dance in the interlude, along with several scenes of the members in hip hop style costumes.

== "Party @the BBS" ==
Kiba of Akiba (キバオブアキバ, Kiba obu Akiba) is an otailish (stylish otaku) death pop band from Kyoto, whose musical style combined screamo with otaku culture. The song "Party @the BBS" has been called a classic live song. Following the limited release of "Animation With You", "Party @the BBS" served as the second single from the album Yeniol. The song, which has interpreted to be a love song, contains an internet motif of "Let's party at the bulletin board system" played in a heavy tune, with lyrics such as "We have been waiting here, for you" sung in a melancholy manner. A live performance of the song was uploaded to YouTube on May 1, 2012.

== Bonus tracks ==
The song "Kimi to Anime Ga Mitai – Answer for Animation With You" (君とアニメが見たい～Answer for Animation With You; "I Want to See Anime with You – Answer for Animation With You") is a cover of the Kiba of Akiba song "Animation With You", released in 2011. The lyrics have been changed as to represent a girl's point of view. Nakamoto stated that the song was the first time she had heard metal death growls, though the growls were ultimately left to the other two members for the cover. Unlike the original song, the chorus contains background vocals from Mizuno and Kikuchi. The latter called the song one of the band's beloved, thanking Kiba of Akiba for the introduction.

Kiba of Akiba's performance of "Doki Doki ☆ Morning" is described to be not only a cover, but one with added "Kiba style" arrangements. Changes to the original include a higher tempo, synths filling up the space, and varying styles of vocals. When asked of the production of the song, the Kiba of Akiba producers replied "We touched on things the world had never seen before. In fact, our work seemed rather fresh, and everyone in the studio was dying of laughter."

== Track listing ==
No.	Title	Lyrics	Music	Arrangement	Length
1.	"Iine!" (いいね！) (Babymetal)	Nakata Caos (中田カオス)	Mish-Mosh	Daiki Kasho	4:10
2.	"Party @the BBS" (Party @The BBS) (Kiba of Akiba)	Kiba of Akiba	Kiba of Akiba	Kiba of Akiba (キバオブアキバ)	3:42
3.	"Kimi to Anime Ga Mitai – Answer for Animation with You" (君とアニメが見たい～Answer for Animation With You) (Babymetal featuring You (Cover of Kiba of Akiba)) (BABYMETAL feat. 君 (Cover of キバオブアキバ)) (bonus track)	Kiba of Akiba	Kiba of Akiba	Kiba of Akiba	4:00
4.	"Doki Doki ☆ Morning" (Ver. Koa) (ド・キ・ド・キ☆モーニング Ver.Koa) (Kiba of Akiba (Cover of Babymetal)) (キバオブアキバ (Cover of BABYMETAL)) (bonus track)	Nakametal (ナカメタル)	Norizō (のりぞー); Motonari Murakawa (村カワ基成)	SOH (Oh! S-D); Murakawa; Kiba of Akiba	2:57
Total length:					14:19

== Credits and personnel ==
Credits adapted from "Babymetal / Kiba of Akiba" single cover notes and Google Play. Bonus tracks lack credits.

Recording and management

- Recorded at Studio246 Kyoto
- Mixed at Studio246 Kyoto
- Mastered at Parasight Mastering

Personnel

- Suzuka Nakamoto (SU-METAL) – vocals (lead and background)
- Yui Mizuno (YUIMETAL) – vocals (lead and background)
- Moa Kikuchi (MOAMETAL) – vocals (lead and background)
- Futoshi (ふとし) – vocals
- Mora (もら) – guitar
- 326 – bass
- Asai (あさい) – programming, vocals
- Vava (VAVA) – drums
- Konyo Aoki (青木昆陽) – keyboard, Rangaku
- Norikazu Nakayama (Nakata Caos / 中田カオス) – lyrics
- Nobuaki Miyasaka (Mish-Mosh) – music
- Sari Miyasaka (Mish-Mosh) – music
- Daiki Kasho (daiki kasho) – arrangement, audio engineer
- Millennium Japan (millennium JAPAN) – production
- Yasuhisa Kataoka – audio engineer
- Inoue Noriyuki – recording, audio mixing
- Tucky – mastering
- Arimetal – art direction, design
- Higumetal – photo
- Metalnaka Shimon – illustration

== Charts ==
Chart (2012)	Peak position
Japan (Oricon)	46
Japan Hot Singles Sales (Billboard)	50

== Release history ==
Region	Date	Format	Label
Japan	March 7, 2012	CD; digital download	Juonbu Records
Worldwide	March 7, 2012	Digital download	Toy's Factory
