= Gifted (2003 film) =

- Genre: Drama
- Written by: Kay Mellor
- Directed by: Douglas Mackinnon
- Starring: Kenny Doughty; Claire Goose; Christine Tremarco; Paul Popplewell; David Hayman; Steve Evets
- Composer: Julian Nott
- Country of origin: United Kingdom
- Original language: English

Production
- Executive producer: Pippa Cross
- Producer: Ruth Gogarty
- Cinematography: Lawrence Jones
- Editor: Anthony Ham
- Running time: 95 minutes
- Production company: Rollem Productions

Original release
- Network: ITV
- Release: 29 October 2003

Gifted is a one-off British drama thriller television film, written and devised by Kay Mellor, that first broadcast on ITV on 29 October 2003. Starring Kenny Doughty, Claire Goose and Christine Tremarco, the film follows top-flight footballer Jamie Gilliam (Doughty), who is accused of rape by Sharon Harrison (Tremarco), a part-time lap dancer. When Gilliam strongly denies the accusations made against him, Harrison drops the case following intense scrutiny from the press, leading her best friend, Maxine Norris (Goose), to look deeper into the case.

The film was produced by Rollem Productions, and directed by Douglas Mackinnon. 6.19 million viewers tuned in for the initial broadcast. Gifted was released on DVD via IMC Vision on 7 February 2005.

== Broadcast ==
Reports in The Independent in October 2003 suggested that Gifted was under review to be shelved, due to striking similarities with ongoing news stories involving a group of then unidentified Premiership footballers involved in the rape of a seventeen-year-old girl. However, despite these reports, the transmission date was brought forward three weeks, from 19 November to 29 October.

== Reception ==
Carol Midgeley for The Times reviewed Gifted, writing; "What a piece of luck for ITV that Kay Mellor’s drama about a footballer accused of date rape came to fruition just as the alleged gang rape of a 17-year-old girl by a group of Premiership footballers was being splashed across the Sunday papers. Call me a cynic, but I'm guessing the press office was cock-a-hoop. The fact is that no amount of champagne press launches and glossy publicity packs could compete with the real life, gory details of a girl being “roasted” as a way to work up the viewing public's appetite."

Kathryn Flett for The Observer added; "Kay Mellor is a fundamentally fluffy writer. The plot regularly fell apart at its seams, the direction was so emotionally distanced from its subject that it could have been the work of Amanda Burton, many of the key parts were perversely miscast, the char actors were clichés and the dialogue often pathetically girly. n fact, there was so much else that was wrong with Gifted that it is hard to know where to end the criticism, but I'll have a go because I think I've been hard enough."

== Cast ==
- Kenny Doughty as Jamie Gilliam
- Claire Goose as Maxine Norris
- Christine Tremarco as Sharon Harrison
- Paul Popplewell as Sean Dwyer
- David Hayman as Michael Sanderson
- Steve Evets as Mr. Gilliam
- John Benfield as Harry Boothroyd
- Caroline Carver as Faye Steadman
- Andrew Dunn as DC Fairchild
- Bill Fellows as Ian Norris
- John McArdle as Steve Moran
- Kay Mellor as Linda Norris
- Mary Jo Randle as Mrs. Gilliam
- Nick Reding as Adam Gosling
- Joanna Rowden as DS Dickson
- Abdul Salis as Rowan Angelis
- Pip Torrens as Richard Neilson
- Richard J Scott as Football Team Captain
