= Tremarco =

Tremarco is a surname. Notable people with the surname include:

- Carl Tremarco (born 1985), English footballer
- Christine Tremarco (born 1977), British actress
