= City Central (TV series) =

British police procedural television series (1998–2000)

- Genre: Drama; Police procedural
- Created by: Tony Jordan
- Starring: Paul Nicholls; Dave Hill; Ian Aspinall; Ashley Jensen; Stephen Lord; Sarah Kirkman; Sean McKenzie; Michael Begley; Katie Blake; Martin Walsh; Lorraine Ashbourne; Philip Martin Brown; Terence Harvey; Ray Stevenson; Ian Burfield; Kate Gartside; George Costigan; Connie Hyde
- Composer: Barry Adamson
- Country of origin: United Kingdom
- Original language: English
- No. of series: 3
- No. of episodes: 32

Production
- Executive producers: Mal Young; Laura Mackie
- Producers: John Yorke; Ken Horn
- Production location: United Kingdom
- Cinematography: Geoff Healey
- Editors: Mike Jones; Xavier Russell; Liana Del Giudice; Steve Singleton
- Running time: 50 minutes
- Production company: BBC Studios

Original release
- Network: BBC One
- Release: 4 April 1998 – 19 June 2000

City Central is a British television police procedural drama series, written and created by Tony Jordan, that first broadcast on BBC One on 4 April 1998.

Described by the Radio Times as "Z Cars for the 1990s", City Central follows the everyday lives of officers based at the inner-city Christmas Street police station in Manchester. Three series of City Central were produced, with the final episode broadcasting on 19 June 2000.

== Background ==
The series was the BBC's third attempt to rival The Bill, following Waterfront Beat (1990) and Out of the Blue (1995).

Many media outlets claimed at the time of the first' series premiere that it had initially been written as a "star vehicle" for actor Paul Nicholls; although these claims were later dismissed by creator Tony Jordan. Nicholls claimed at the time of accepting the role of PC Terry Sydenham, he felt "troubled and depressed", and felt that a change of character would help him with his own lifestyle, after stepping down from the role of Joe Wicks on EastEnders in November 1997. However, before filming on the second series began, Nicholls asked for his character to be written out. He later commented, "I was well on my way to a total breakdown. I was drinking a lot and taking drugs. I had lost control of my life."

Aside from Nicholls, the first two series largely retained the same cast. The third series, the first not to be produced by Jordan, saw a change in the format. The series adopted a slightly less gritty feel, with more of the interpersonal relationships of the cast explored. An entirely new cast were brought in to fill CID, with Ray Stevenson, Ian Burfield and Kate Gartside all axed following the conclusion of the second series. George Costigan and Connie Hyde joined the series as DI Jack Carter and DS Janet Miller, respectively. Following the death of her son in the second series, Yvonne Mackey (Lorraine Ashbourne) appears in a civilian capacity only.

Notably, the series has never been released on DVD, and despite a single re-run on UKTV Drama in 2004, has not been otherwise repeated on television since its original broadcast.

== Cast ==
The cast of the first series (from L-R): Ian Burfield, Paul Nicholls, Dave Hill, Lorraine Ashbourne, Sarah Kirkman, Kate Gartside, Ian Aspinall, Ashley Jensen, Terence Harvey, Ray Stevenson and Stephen Lord

=== Main ===
- Paul Nicholls as PC Terry Sydenham (Series 1―Series 2, Episode 1)
- Dave Hill as PC Pete Redfern
- Ian Aspinall as PC Colin Jitlada
- Ashley Jensen as PC Sue Chappell
- Stephen Lord as PC Steve Jackson (Series 1―2)
- Sarah Kirkman as PC/DC Mary Sutcliffe
- Sean McKenzie as PC Nick Green
- Michael Begley as PC Richard Law
- Katie Blake as PC Judy Byrd (Series 2)
- Martin Walsh as PC/Sgt. Clive Gardener (Series 3)
- Lorraine Ashbourne as Sgt Yvonne Mackey
- Philip Martin Brown as Sgt Paul Dobson
- Terence Harvey as Chief Inspector George Barnard
- Ray Stevenson as DI Tony Baynham (Series 1―2)
- Ian Burfield as DS Ray Pickering (Series 1―2)
- Kate Gartside as DS Jane McCormack (Series 1―2)
- George Costigan as DI Jack Carter (Series 3)
- Connie Hyde as DS Janet Miller (Series 3)

=== Recurring ===
- Jennifer Luckraft as PC Kate Foster (Series 1―2)
- John Brobbey as DC Danny Abbott (Series 1)
- Andrew Redman as Inspector Mike Willis (Series 1)
- Emily Hamilton as Lucy Barnard (Series 1―2)
- John Biggins as Norman (Series 1―2)
- Damian Zuk as Lee Mackey (Series 1―2)
- Ciaran Griffiths as Simon Mackey (Series 1―2)
- Christine Tremarco as Nikki Reed (Series 1)
- Kate Reynolds as Debbie Jackson (Series 1―2)
- Annie Hulley as Sarah Sydenham (Series 1―2)
- Caroline Carver as Alison (Series 1)
- Steve Huison as Brian 'Batty' Edwards (Series 1)
- Andrew Lancel as Connor Rice (Series 2)
- Jayne Charlton MacKenzie as Maggie Baynham (Series 2)
- Julia Ford as Detective Superintendent Gagan (Series 2)

== Episodes ==
Series	Episodes	Originally released	
Series	Episodes	First released	Last released
1	10	4 April 1998	20 June 1998
2	12	27 February 1999	15 May 1999
3	10	15 April 2000	19 June 2000

=== Series 1 (1998) ===
- No episode was broadcast on 9 May due to the Eurovision Song Contest 1998.

No.	Title	Directed by	Written by	Original release date
1	"Parallel Lines"	Sallie Aprahamain	Tony Jordan	4 April 1998
When the body of a young woman, later identified as fifteen-year-old Hayley Morrison, is dredged from the canal, a murder enquiry is launched, but for an already overworked CID team, resources are stretched to their limit. Terry Sydenham arrives at Christmas Street for his first day and is given a guided tour of the city by Pete. Colin and Mary deal with Alex Moore (Jack Ellis), a man who claims to have lost the keys to his house, unaware that he moved out months ago and is trying to exact revenge on his cheating wife. Steve and Sue attend an armed siege at a residential home, while regular bail absconder 'Batty' Brian Edwards (Steve Huison) causes further problems for Colin and Mary.
2	"Pressure"	Sallie Aprahamain	Tony Jordan	11 April 1998
The investigation into the murder of Hayley Morrison continues, as Jane re-interviews her best friend, Laura Mason, who suggests that Hayley's absent father may have returned to Manchester. Sue and Colin investigate when a robber sporting a bright-red comedy wig and glasses escapes with cash from a betting shop. Despite his reluctance, Pete is forced to arrest Nikki Reed (Christine Tremarco), a regular shoplifter whom none of the team are happy to be reacquainted with. Meanwhile, Leonard Harris, a high-ranking member of the Police Authority, is burgled, and an empty baby-seat in a car involved in a traffic accident sends Mary and Terry on a frantic search for the missing child.
3	"Justice "	Simon Meyers	Matthew Graham	18 April 1998
Terry returns from his morning shift to find an intruder in his house, but realises first impressions can be deceptive. Meanwhile, CID are desperate to find Geoff Morrison (Fine Time Fontayne) after a number of towels covered in Hayley's blood are found in his flat. Pete and Terry attempt to lift community spirits by tackling rogue builder Harry Willett, who has been fitting sub-standard kitchens. Nikki Reed finds herself back in custody, but Yvonne isn't in the mood for playing games. Tony decides to call off his affair with Lucy. Sue and Steve are faced with an emergency. Terry's attempts to win the affections of old schoolfriend Alison (Caroline Carver) are interrupted when he spots a wanted shoplifter.
4	"Throwing it All Away"	Simon Meyers	Matthew Graham	25 April 1998
Sue faces an armed robber, but the subsequent interview leaves her shaken, and questioning her future in the force. Richard gets a visit from a deranged young man looking for his brother. Sue is determined to celebrate her 25th birthday in style, and ends up in the arms of Ray.
5	"A Quiet Evening In"	Keith Boak	Tony Jordan	2 May 1998
The relief shift on night duty are kept busy after Ch. Insp. Barnard orders a crackdown on beggars. 'Batty' Brian Edwards finds himself back in the cells after breaking the conditions of his electronic tag, but the last thing Yvonne expects of the situation is to be on the receiving end of an official complaint for assault. Pete and Terry deal with a case of wife battery, while Richard is inundated with constant reports of UFO sightings. Meanwhile, Jane makes a breakthrough in the murder case when student Sam Reeves (Daniel Betts) arrives at the station with his solicitor to make an unexpected confession. Ray discovers that Tony is having affair with Barnard's daughter Lucy (Emily Hamilton).
6	"Nothing Like a Dame"	Keith Boak	Tony Jordan	16 May 1998
During a quiet shift, which is only helped by the bad weather, Pete and Terry go looking for Nick, who always avoids working in a downpour. Ray finds himself trying to prevent a gang war breaking out in Manchester after two members of the Parsons gang are found beaten, bound and shaven in a disused warehouse. Matters are further complicated when one of Parsons' pool halls is the target of a petrol bomb attack. Tony and Ray seek help from one of Manchester's finest drag queens, Dilly Daley (Ross Kemp) in an attempt to identify the perpetrators. Yvonne tries her best to prevent Nikki from spending a night in the cells, and Jane begins to have doubts about Sam Reeves' confession.
7	"A Night on the Town"	Martin Hutchings	Simon Ashdown	23 May 1998
Yvonne continues to struggle with her feelings of guilt as the investigation into Nikki's murder gets underway. Dobson struggles to retain control in custody after Barnard orders all female runaways to be taken in off the streets. Terry and Pete attend a warehouse burglary, where an unexpected reunion with one of his old schoolfriends, Kumar (Jimi Mistry) leads Terry to realise that being a boy in blue has its downsides. An armed gang carrying out a ram raid send the team on a wild goose chase to a number of hoax calls, but Steve's plan to catch the perpetrators red-handed results in Colin receiving a beating. CID are shocked when forensic evidence links the murders of Nikki and Hayley.
8	"Picking up the Pieces"	Ken Horn	Tony Jordan	30 May 1998
Tony goes AWOL after a heavy night of drinking, forcing Ray and Jane to take charge of the double murder investigation. Mary and Colin are called to the scene of an eviction. Yvonne is forced to give Nick a stern warning after he is reported by several members of the public for loitering around cafes and burger vans whilst on shift. However, his attempts to avoid hard work and fill his stomach pay off when he drums up a witness who claims to have seen Nikki just hours before she died, and provides the team with a vital new lead. Meanwhile, an animal rights protester dressed as Where's Wally (Ben Moor) causes problems for the team when he frequently targets a local butcher's shop.
9	"Only Love Can Break Your Heart"	Martin Hutchings	Ashley Pharaoh	6 June 1998
Ray wakes up to find that his flat has been wrecked by his date from the night before. Terry clashes with his landlord after a car which he supplied information on is found badly damaged. His day goes from bad to worse when he arrives home to find his mum has been assaulted by her new boyfriend, Barry Wilson (Bruce McGregor). Whilst on the trail of a gang of muggers, Steve is stabbed and thrown into the canal. Sue discovers she is pregnant by Ray and is forced to decide whether or not to keep the baby. CID attempt to make headway by interviewing all male Welsh students at Manchester University, but the day proves fruitless until Nick finds a vital piece of evidence in the janitor's kitchen.
10	"Life and Death"	Ken Horn	Tony Jordan	20 June 1998
Barnard is unimpressed when Nick's pursuit of Batty Brian leaves the police riot van overturned on the side of a moving barge. Colin vents his anger when Barnard orders him and Mary to act as removal men. As his home life continues to spiral, Steve returns to work, but struggles to contain himself when the identity of his attacker is revealed. Pete attempts to use underhand tactics to win Terry his job back. CID find themselves going round in circles as they try to pinpoint Millington (Darren Brown)'s whereabouts, but as the net finally closes in, Tony goes all out to catch his man. Jane catches wind of Tony's affections for Lucy, and decides to request a transfer back to her former department.

=== Series 2 (1999) ===
No.	Title	Directed by	Written by	Original release date	Viewers (millions)
1	"The Grace of God"	Kenneth Gleenan	Tony Jordan	27 February 1999	8.19
A wedding party which descends into a mass riot after a punch up between squabbling relatives proves to be a useful tool for the team to track down a prolific burglar, responsible for more than six robberies. A young tearaway arrested for shoplifting manages to escape Sue's clutches and ends up taking one of the squad cars for a joyride. Jackson is taunted by his fellow colleagues after helping CID catch a maniac who is attacking clergymen. Yvonne tries to persuade a member of the team to attend an after-hours routine call-out to a reported break-in. Pete draws the short straw, but Terry agrees to go in his place - unaware that he is about to be met with a gunman determined to seek revenge on the police.
2	"Moving On"	Ken Horn	Tony Jordan	6 March 1999	7.11
Whilst on a routine door-to-door enquiry, Colin and Mary find themselves chasing an offender who turns out to have been the mastermind behind a recent string of burglaries, later discovered to have been insurance scams perpetrated by the victims. After a minor drug dealer is thrown from the first-floor window of his tower block, Tony and Ray try to track down a vigilante looking for a major drug dealer. Following Terry's memorial, Pete struggles to cope and turns to Terry's mum for guidance. Sue reveals to Mary that she is still pregnant, while Yvonne is worried that her son may have fallen in with the wrong crowd after watching him pull away from home accompanied by a group of strange men.
3	"Neighborhood Botch"	Ken Horn	Tony Jordan	13 March 1999	6.18
The murder of a drug addiction councillor on a supposedly crime-free estate baffles Tony and Ray, when the only evidence as to who fingered the victim lies within the heart of an angry mob out for vengeance. Meanwhile, a pair of hapless street robbers intent on pulling a major job amuse the team, until Barnard orders their seemingly harmless wave of crime to be brought to an end. New recruit PC Judy Bird arrives at the station, and has the thankless task of stepping into Terry's shoes when she's paired with his former partner, Pete. Yvonne looks deeper into Connor Rice (Andrew Lancel) after he turns up at the station claiming to have given her son a job in his rising leisure and entertainment firm.
4	"Second Time Around"	Tim Leandro	Stephen Brady	20 March 1999	7.41
Tony's wedding day arrives, bringing more than a few surprises. As he prepares to tie the knot with Maggie, he thinks all he's got to worry about is being late. He hasn't taken into account running into a fake police officer, the flooded reception, an old mate who wants to kill himself after admitting to a twelve-year-old hit and run, or the return of his ex, Lucy. The suspicious death of a baby leads Steve to believe that the father is responsible, leading to a touching encounter for Sue, who struggles to find the right words to say to Ray. Pete and Judy quarrel over a father arrested for assault after confronting a group of teenagers responsible for beating up his son. Barnard convinces Jane to return to CID.
5	"Paradise Lost"	Tim Leandro	Tony Jordan	27 March 1999	7.27
When the local press leak the address of convicted paedophile Michael Dennison (John McArdle), uniform are sent to control a mob determined to enact their own form of justice. Sue manages to drag Dennison to safety, unaware of his next move. Taking the fragile Sue hostage, Dennison plots his getaway - but Sue isn't exactly sure what he's trying to get away from. Back at the factory, Jane returns to CID to cover for an absent Tony, and quickly links the case of a missing schoolgirl to Sue's kidnapping. The girl's mother, fraught with despair and convinced of Dennison's involvement, decides to torch his now empty house - unaware that her missing daughter is being held captive inside.
6	"Blue Legume"	Ken Horn	Tony Hoare	3 April 1999	N/A
Yvonne returns from her holidays, but her first day back at work does not exactly go to plan when her handbag is stolen. Events take an even more bizarre turn when a male escort turns up at the station looking for her, having been hired by someone posing as 'Terry Sydenham'. Steve and Nick investigate reports of a possible death and find a house booby-trapped with numerous burglar deterrents, forcing Tony to make an early return to work. The fruit and vegetable community comes under scrutiny when a giant aubergine robs a building society, a carrot mugs a customer on his way home from a restaurant and a banana drags an unsuspecting man into an alleyway. Sue struggles to cope.
7	"The Killing Moon"	Ken Horn	Doug Briggs	10 April 1999	6.61
CID prepare a surveillance operation on Les Glover (Colum Convey), a club owner and drug dealer who is gathering cash for a big deal. But just hours before surveillance is due to begin, Glover is mugged outside his club by a former employee desperate to escape to America with his son. Glover refuses to press charges, unaware that a bigger fish is out to catch him. Ray investigates the theft of a series of car thefts, unaware he is about to become the next victim. Steve is convinced Colin has a girlfriend - or boyfriend - and enlists the help of the rest of the relief to find out. Lee turns up at the station to make amends with Yvonne, while her suspicions about Connor (Andrew Lancel) continue to grow.
8	"Northern Soul"	Kenneth Gleenan	Jeff Povey	17 April 1999	6.69
Ray receives word that former cop killer David Crane, now out on licence, is making his way north. Meanwhile, the station receives a number of calls from a man claiming that a police officer will die by 5:00pm that day. As the team try to work out who the target might be, Pete's former partner, Benny Robinson (Trevor Byfield), comes into the frame. Determined not to let another of his colleagues meet the same fate as Terry, Pete tries to play the hero - but fails to prevent the impending tragedy. Meanwhile, Steve struggles on his first day with the ARU, Yvonne suspects she is being stalked, and Barnard is troubled by Lucy's revelation that she had an illicit affair with Ray.
9	"No Son of Mine"	Terry McDonough	Jeff Povey	24 April 1999	N/A
Newly-promoted Mary and Ray interview a man (Steve Evets) who comes into the station claiming to be the new 'Jack the Ripper'. Ray suspects that the man is a timewaster, but meanwhile, a fifteen-year-old boy is reported missing, and soon, the two cases are linked. Ray's day, having faced the tempers of Tony and Barnard, hasn't gone exactly to plan - and wound up, he callously tells the parents of the missing boy that he suspects him to have been working as a rent boy. Meanwhile, Yvonne comes face to face with Connor, Barnard asks Tony to speak to Ray about Lucy's revelations, and Steve, having returned to the relief, confides in Sue about wanting to start a family with Debbie.
10	"Someone to Watch Over Me"	Terry McDonough	Tony Jordan	1 May 1999	6.11
CID mount a surveillance operation on ex-con Gary Spencer following a tip-off suggesting he is about to rob a local post office. Jane and Colin stop a man for dangerous driving on their way into work, unaware he is one of the main suspects in the op. Ray and Tony, held up in an obbo flat belonging to one Brian Hetherington (Peter Kay), argue over Ray's treatment of Lucy, while her revelations force her father to face up to his feelings. As the robbery gets underway, the team are compromised when Jane inadvertently gets caught up in the action. Following Spencer's arrest, he asks to meet Barnard in order to cut a deal - immunity in return for the identity of Terry Sydenham's killer.
11	"Fair and Foul"	Martin Hutchings	Patrick Wilde	8 May 1999	6.24
Richard and Nick are arrested after scoping out a vehicle being used as a decoy car in an operation to target a group of car thieves. Spencer is brought into custody, but initially refuses to talk; until Ray's unorthodox methods lead him to name Connor Rice as Terry's killer. DSI Gagan from D-Division arrives to oversee the operation. As Barnard and an armed response team raid Connor's flat, Pete, Judy and Colin are on Lee's tail, after spotting him taking drugs from a drop. When Lee leads them directly to Connor, a chase ensues and Connor is finally arrested, but refuses to explain why he killed Terry. Sue and Steve suspect Tony to be the latest victim of a gang of thieves posing as removal men.
12	"Life, Liberty and Pursuit"	Martin Hutchings	Tony Jordan	15 May 1999	6.47
Rice refuses to reveal why he killed Terry, until a face-to-face with Yvonne, who realises that he has hidden the murder weapon right under her nose. Pete flies solo on his last day, until he realises that maybe he isn't quite ready for retirement just yet. Steve tries to prove his worth by single-handedly chasing a burglary suspect for more than four hours. Tony receives divorce papers from Maggie. Colin and Jane prepare to go public with their relationship. As Rice is charged with Terry's murder, he gives Yvonne a stern warning that his reign of terror has yet to come to an end. As Lee is recently from custody, two of Rice's men follow him back to his mother's house, tie him up and booby trap the kitchen.

=== Series 3 (2000) ===
No.	Title	Directed by	Written by	Original release date	Viewers (millions)
1	"No Direction Home"	Martin Hutchings	Chris Murray	15 April 2000	6.88
A young homeless couple, Denny and Naz (Shelley Conn), responsible for a series of cashpoint robberies across the city, find themselves on the receiving end when the young girl's father sends a hitman to give her wayward boyfriend a stern warning. Meanwhile, new PC Clive Gardener gets off to a good start when he tries to play mediator between a young boy and a local gang, all while his wife is going into early labour, leaving Sgt. Dobson to act as her birthing partner. Pete tries to convince Yvonne to return to work. New DI Jack Carter (George Costigan) immediately ruffles feathers by arresting a magistrate involved with a group of worshippers using the occult as a form of intimidation.
2	"Half Man, Half Cop"	Terry McDonough	Jeff Povey	22 April 2000	N/A
Uniform are on the trail of fake cop, throwing bricks through victims' windows and then robbing them under the premise of having turned up to secure the crime scene. Matters are made worse when one of the elderly victims helps Janet create an E-fit which looks exactly like Nick. Meanwhile, a number of suspects have been identified as part of a drug-running operation. Clive and Sue tail one of the runners, Grant (Kenny Doughty), but are shocked to see him enter a restaurant and sit down for a pint with none other than Barnard, who turns out to be the new love of Grant's mum. When Pete is asked to complete a self-assessment form, he stupidly employs Richard, with hilarious consequences.
3	"Everything Must Go"	Terry McDonough	Mark Davies Markham	29 April 2000	N/A
It's Clive's first day as acting sergeant, and all appears to be going well, having earned the respect of his colleagues very early on - until Nick and Richard go missing in the middle of their shift. Having attended a routine call-out to assist social services taking the two children of long term drug addict Karen (Sarah Parish) into care, they find themselves at the mercy of Gerald Ridley (Andrew Tiernan), the children's father, a small-time drug dealer who escaped the clutches of Jack and Janet earlier in the day during a bungled drugs bust at the home of known pusher Kevo (Jeff Hordley). An unstable Ridley, armed with a gun, takes the two unsuspecting plods hostage - leaving Jack to play negotiator.
4	"Respect"	Kenny Glenaan	Mark Davies Markham	6 May 2000	N/A
Clive has new car stolen during a works night out. When a group of squatters decide to make a stand against a local landlord, Mullholland (Andrew Schofield), who uses unsavoury means to evict them from one of his vacant properties, Jack seizes the opportunity to bring his old nemesis to justice. Nadim, a fellow tenant facing Mullholland's wrath, happens to be a good friend of Clive's - but despite his best efforts, Nadim refuses help from the police. Local drug dealer Andy, unable to pay a debt owed to Mulholland, is hired to torch Nadim's house - forcing Clive to take heroic action. Meanwhile, Richard and Colin are on the trail of a lost snake owned by strip club heiress Zora (Pooky Quesnel).
5	"Above and Beyond"	Kenny Glenaan	Chris Murray	20 May 2000	N/A
Janet goes undercover to snare a gang dealing in stolen videos. The lachey, Vic (Tony Pitts), spills the beans after being caught on tape revealing the location of a planned deal. Jack enlists the help of uniform to take part in a surveillance operation. Gub Sinclair (Paul Broughton), a local layabout and petty thief, enlists his daughter's help to commit a series of burglaries. Whilst in custody, Dobson notices that Sinclair appears to be suffering from concussion, and calls in police doctor Derek Reska (Charles De'Ath) to check him out. All appears well, until Sinclair collapses in cell and Reska is nowhere to be found. When Sinclair later dies from his injuries, Pete is mortified to find Reska has been out on the lash.
6	"Nutcase"	Dyleth Thomas	Nick Saltrese	24 May 2000	N/A
Jack is in court for the prosecution of Barry Roberts, a major drug dealer, but is left irate when the star witness, Alfie Stokes, a sadistic, underworld-type who now claims to have found God, changes his testimony following a heart to heart with Yvonne, who is now working for the Witness Support scheme. Colin and Sue are on the case of a man found collapsed from an allergic reaction, but Colin suspects foul play when he discovers that the man's twin is out for his heart - literally. Richard and Nick find themselves sandwiched between a pair of warring comedians (Bobby Knutt and Ted Robbins), while Nick is livid that Sgt. Dobson forgot to enter him for his sergeant's exams, and threatens to take action.
7	"She's the One"	Delyth Thomas	Mark Davies Markham	27 May 2000	6.46
Jack seeks Yvonne's help after being the latest victim of a gang of burglars operating in the area. Aside from his precious signed LPs of The Beatles and The Dave Brubeck Quartet, the gang have also managed to half-inch his illegally held replica Colt 45 pistol. The gang appear to be operating out of a second-hand emporium, but the owner, (Tony Mooney) isn't best pleased with his latest selection of goods. Yvonne, already familiar with one of the perpetrators, manages to track him down - but not before he ends up with a bullet in his leg after attempting to rob Jack's next-door neighbour. Meanwhile, Colin is drawn into a couple's kinky fantasies whilst on a surveillance operation.
8	"Death Becomes Her"	Martin Hutchings	Nick Saltrese	3 June 2000	6.09
When a body disappears from the hospital morgue, Jack recognises the victim as a gypsy matriarch whom he gave mouth-to-mouth to the night before during the break-up of a bare knuckle fight. To improve relations, Barnard decides to spend a shift out on the beat and is paired with Clive, whose methods of modern-day policing don't quite live up to his expectations. Meanwhile, Sue and Pete continually run into an elderly thief who claims he is trying to raise money to take his sick wife to Lourdes. Colin runs a sweepstake on an amnesiac who can't remember his own name. Janet and Mary's investigation into a gang robbing petrol stations takes an interesting turn into the world of women's lingerie.
9	"Community Spirit"	David Innes Edwards	Chris Murray	10 June 2000	5.45
The Carcroft estate has become a hotbed for criminal activity. Hampered by the big brass, Pete, the estate's official liaison officer, is forced to hold a Q&A session with the residents - but not a single person turns up. The next day, he catches ten-year-old Mark McGee (Jack P. Shepherd) at the wheel of a stolen car. When he gives the lippy youngster a clip round the ear, he ends up being suspended. Meanwhile, another local lad, Euan Bell, son of Carol (Siobhan Finneran) has disappeared. His best friend, Leggy (Gary Damer), refuses to give up what happened to his partner in crime, and the team soon realise that Pete's knowledge is sorely missed as a search gets underway.
10	"History"	David Innes Edwards	Tony Jordan	19 June 2000	5.18
It's a busy final visit to Christmas Street as Jack is forced to go into hiding after Mark Dixon (Christopher Fairbank), a murderer he put away six years ago, is released from prison and immediately seeks revenge by taking out his former DS. When Dixon turns up at the station, it's Yvonne, whom Jack has taken an unsuspecting shine to, that once again finds herself in the firing line. Meanwhile, Colin's distant cousin (Navin Chowdhry) turns up seeking vengeance on his former racist schoolteacher, Nick and Richard are paired up with a pair of customs and excise officers to investigate a bootleg alcohol vendor, and Mary finds her secondment to CID might not be as permanent as she first thought.
