= Arcadiy Golubovich =

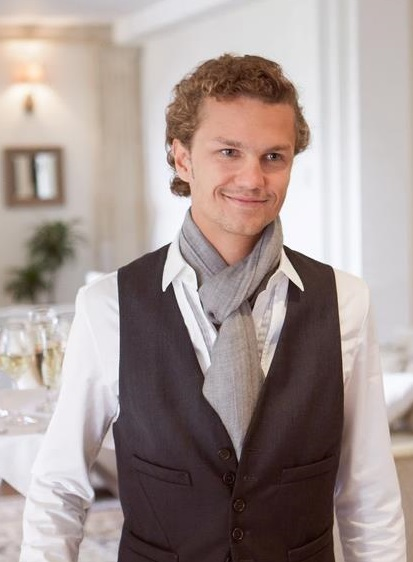
- Born: Arcadiy Alekseevich Golubovich; June 28, 1987 (age 37); Moscow, Soviet Union
- Occupation(s): producer, director, writer, actor, investor.
- Years active: 2004–present

Arcadiy Golubovich (Russian: Аркадий Алексеевич Голубович; born June 28, 1987) is a Russian film producer, director, writer, actor, technology investor and businessman.

Arcadiy's most well known works include A Hologram for the King (2016) and 99 Homes (2015).

== Personal life ==
Since 2008 Arcadiy has been living between Los Angeles and his home in London. Arcadiy's family are well-known collectors of Oriental art.

Arcadiy has an older brother Ilya Golubovich, and two younger sisters, Nataliya Golubovich and Sofia Mirimskaya.

Growing up in Russia, Arcadiy attended Russia's first private school in Moscow 'Rosinka' (1993-1995), then transferred to Mathematical School #57 (1995-2000). Arcadiy graduated Moscow School of Economics (2000-2005) in the International baccalaureate program majoring in literature, economics and history of arts. After graduating Moscow Economic School, Arcadiy attended university in London. Arcadiy graduated from University of the Arts London (college of Central Saint Martins University) with BA in Theater and Film Directing in 2008.

In 2010 Arcadiy took a training course in acting in the Lee Strasberg Theatre and Film Institute with Robert Hallack.

== Producing career ==
=== Early work: 2004-2012 ===
At age 16, Arcadiy executive produced his first feature film The Aryan Couple directed by John Daily, starring Oscar-winner Martin Landau and Judy Parfitt. Arcadiy also became a board member in the production company FAME (Film And Music Entertainment).

After college Arcadiy worked part-time with Parallel Media Film Fund out of Los Angeles where he produced his first movie High School, starring Oscar-winner Adrien Brody.

=== Current work: 2012–current ===
In 2012 Arcadiy created the media finance department with Corporate Finance Bank in Moscow, which became a leading film and TV debt provider in Russia.

In 2013 Arcadiy founded Primeridian LLC., a motion picture production and financing company based in Los Angeles.

Tribeca Film Festival hosted the world premiere of the Golubovich-produced film A Hologram for the King.

== Investing career ==
In 2014 Arcadiy with his brother Ilya started I2BF Digital (a branch of I2BF Global Ventures, based in New York City, which is founded by his brother Ilya Golubovich). I2BF Digital specializes in digital and media innovative technologies.

== Humanitarian work ==
In 2005 Arcadiy with his father established the Golubovich Foundation which provided international scholarships to Russian students in collaboration with St. Martins University of Arts London and Trinity Laban Conservatoire of Music and Dance.

== In the media ==
In 2013 Tatler magazine (Russia) featured Arcadiy as the It Boy in July. The article talks about Arcadiy being a stylish, social businessman and filmmaker, with a passion for collecting Japanese katana swords.

== Filmography ==
Films that garnered Arcadiy the most recognition include:

- Black 47 (2018)
- A Hologram for the King (2016)
- 99 Homes (2015)
- American Heist (2014)
- Third Person (2013)
- Demoted (2011)
- HIGH School (2010)
- The Black Waters of Echo's Pond (2009)
- The Pool Boys (2009)
- Autopsy (2008)
- A Broken Life (2008)
- The Aryan Couple (2004)
