= Joan Carr-Wiggin =

Canadian independent filmmaker

- Occupation(s): filmmaker, writer, director, producer

Joan Carr-Wiggin is a Canadian independent filmmaker who has worked as a writer, director, and producer. She began working as a filmmaker in her 40s in the early 1990s after a career as an economist and a novelist.

She is married to producer David Gordian, her frequent collaborator. Previously based in Victoria, the two now reside in Toronto. The two got their start with 1994's Sleeping with Strangers, an independent film starring Adrienne Shelly.

In a guest post for IndieWire, she spoke of the barriers women face in the industry:

So many young men on set—sometimes I fear it's 100% of them—are convinced they can be the next Orson Welles. Yet when I ask smart, capable young women working on set, "Hey, why don't you think about directing?" most of them immediately reply, "Oh I could never do that." Why do they think that? They think that because too many people are saying women can't do the job. Or can only do it when the circumstances are perfect, or if it's a certain kind of movie, or if they don't have children…

== Filmography ==
- Sleeping with Strangers (1994) (writer)
- Honeymoon (1997)
- My First Wedding (2006) (writer)
- A Previous Engagement (2008) (writer)
- If I Were You (2012)
- Happily Ever After (2016)
- Love of My Life (2017)
- The Bet (2018)
- Getting to Know You (2019)
- A Grand Romantic Gesture (2022)
- Better Days (2023)
