= The Scarlet Pimpernel (TV series) =

- Series one title card
- Based on: The Scarlet Pimpernel by Baroness Emmuska Orczy
- Written by: Richard Carpenter
- Starring: Richard E. Grant; Martin Shaw; Elizabeth McGovern; Caroline Carver
- Theme music composer: Michal Pavlíček
- Country of origin: United Kingdom
- Original language: English
- No. of series: 2
- No. of episodes: 6

Production
- Producers: Julian Murphy; Colin Ludlow
- Cinematography: Simon Kossoff; Peter Greenhalgh
- Editors: Jeremy Strachan; Beverley Mills
- Running time: 90 minutes
- Production companies: London Films; A&E Television Productions; BBC Birmingham Productions

Original release
- Network: BBC One
- Release: 24 January 1999 – 1 November 2000

The Scarlet Pimpernel is a 1999 series of television drama programmes loosely based on Baroness Emmuska Orczy's series of novels, set during the French Revolution.

It stars Richard E. Grant as Sir Percy Blakeney, and his alter ego, the eponymous hero. The first series also starred Elizabeth McGovern as his wife Marguerite and Martin Shaw as the Pimpernel's archrival, Paul Chauvelin. Robespierre was played by Ronan Vibert.

It was filmed in the Czech Republic and scored by a Czech composer, Michal Pavlíček.

== Cast ==
- Richard E Grant as Sir Percy Blakeney
- Ronan Vibert as Robespierre
- Elizabeth McGovern as Lady Marguerite Blakeney
- Martin Shaw as Chauvelin
- Christopher Fairbank as Fumier
- Anthony Green as Sir Andrew Foulkes
- Beth Goddard as Lady Suzanne Foulkes
- John McEnery as Sir William Wetherby
- Gerard Murphy as Planchet
- Ron Donachie as Mazarini
- Jonathan Coy as Prince of Wales

== Episodes ==
=== Series 1 (1999) ===
No. overall	No. in series	Title	Directed by	Written by	Original release date
1	1	"The Scarlet Pimpernel"	Patrick Lau	Richard Carpenter	24 January 1999
2	2	"Valentin Gautier"	Patrick Lau	Richard Carpenter	31 January 1999
3	3	"A King's Ransom"	Edward Bennett	Richard Carpenter	7 February 1999

=== Series 2 (2000) ===
No. overall	No. in series	Title	Directed by	Written by	Original release date
4	1	"Ennui"	Graham Theakston	Matthew Hall	18 October 2000
5	2	"Friends and Enemies"	Simon Langton	Alan Whiting	25 October 2000
6	3	"A Good Name"	Simon Langton	Rob Heyland	1 November 2000

== Awards ==
Caroline Carver won a Royal Television Society Best Actress Award for her performance as Claudette in "A Good Name".
