= The Magical Legend of the Leprechauns =

- Written by: Peter Barnes
- Directed by: John Henderson
- Starring: Randy Quaid; Whoopi Goldberg; Roger Daltrey; Colm Meaney; Caroline Carver
- Music by: Richard Harvey
- Countries of origin: United Kingdom; United States; Germany
- Original language: English

Production
- Producer: Paul Lowin
- Cinematography: Clive Tickner
- Running time: 172 min. (2 parts)
- Production company: Hallmark Entertainment

Original release
- Network: NBC
- Release: 7 November 1999

The Magical Legend of the Leprechauns is a 1999 fantasy television miniseries. It stars Randy Quaid, Colm Meaney, Kieran Culkin, Roger Daltrey, Caroline Carver and Whoopi Goldberg. The miniseries contains two main stories that eventually intertwine: the first being the story of an American businessman who visits Ireland and encounters magical leprechauns and the second, a story of a pair of star-crossed lovers who happen to be a fairy and a leprechaun, belonging to opposing sides of a magical war. The series contains many references to Romeo and Juliet, such as two lovers taking poison and feuding clans.

The film was first aired on 7 November 1999 on NBC. Emma Townshend's song "We Can Fly Away" was the theme song for the film.

== Plot ==
Jack Woods is an American businessman on holiday in Ireland. During a hike, he sees Irish beauty Kathleen Fitzpatrick swimming naked. Kathleen catches him and chases him off, but Jack is smitten with her beauty. That evening, Jack saves Seamus Muldoon, a leprechaun, from drowning. In gratitude, Muldoon introduces Jack to his wife Mary and son Mickey and shows him the mystical world of the leprechauns. Jack gets used to the little people he shares the house with, because they help him to get to know Kathleen.

Meanwhile, Mickey falls in love with the fairy princess Jessica. They begin a relationship, which thrives even after Jessica finds out that Mickey is a leprechaun. Jessica's hot-headed cousin, Count Grogan opposes the marriage, as leprechauns and fairies are traditionally enemies. Tensions flare between Mickey and Grogan, leading to Mickey killing Grogan. After Jessica's parents learn that Mickey has killed Count Grogan, they send her to a hidden underwater castle. Mickey rescues her and flies with her to his uncle Sir Aloysius Jantee, the butter fairy. Jessica's parents think Mickey has kidnapped her and they start a war with the leprechauns.

Once the war begins, the fairies stop taking care of nature, causing the seasonal weather patterns to spiral out of control. Mickey and Jessica obtain poison from the butter fairies and threaten to take it unless the fighting stops. Their parents are unable to make peace, so they take the poison. Their bodies are brought before their parents, who become distraught. Jack convinces the warring parties to make peace. The Grand Banshee brings back not only Jessica and Mickey, but all of the lost leprechauns and fairies. Mickey and Jessica marry, Jack and Kathleen are reconciled, and the long-lasting war is finally over.

== Production ==
The shooting took place in England and lasted 10 weeks. The scenes involving the leprechauns and main character Jack Woods had to be "digitally spliced together" later, because all characters were portrayed by "full-size actors".

== Reception ==
The film was not well received. Variety and The Washington Post criticized the script and story, unfavorably noting the influence of Romeo and Juliet. New York Magazine spoke favorably of Whoopi Goldberg's performance as the Grand Banshee, but reviewer John Leonard admitted to being too preoccupied with current events to give a fair assessment.

== Cast ==
- Daniel Betts as Mickey Muldoon
- Caroline Carver as Princess Jessica
- Colm Meaney as Seamus Muldoon
- Zoë Wanamaker as Mary Muldoon
- Roger Daltrey as King Boric
- Harriet Walter as Queen Morag
- Randy Quaid as Jack Woods
- Orla Brady as Kathleen Fitzpatrick
- Whoopi Goldberg as the Grand Banshee
- Phyllida Law as Lady Margaret
- Kevin McKidd as Jericho O'Grady
- Kieran Culkin as Barney O'Grady
- Stephen Moore as Sir Aloysius Jantee
- Tony Curran as Sean Devine
- Frank Finlay as General Bulstrode
- Jonathan Firth as Count Grogan
- Peter Serafinowicz as George Fitzpatrick
