= A Grand Romantic Gesture =

British drama film

- Directed by: Joan Carr-Wiggin
- Screenplay by: Joan Carr-Wiggin
- Produced by: David Gordian; Alan Latham
- Starring: Gina McKee; Douglas Hodge; Dylan Llewellyn; Rob Stewart
- Production companies: Paragraph Pictures; Highfield Pictures
- Release date: February 8, 2022
- Running time: 108 minutes
- Countries: United Kingdom; Canada
- Language: English

A Grand Romantic Gesture is a 2022 romantic-comedy film. Written and directed by Joan Carr-Wiggin, it is produced by Paragraph Pictures. It stars Gina McKee, Douglas Hodge, Dylan Llewellyn and Rob Stewart.

== Synopsis ==
A woman (McKee) is encouraged by her husband (Stewart) and daughter (Reynolds) to take up a hobby after losing her job and she starts amateur-dramatics, gets a role as Juliet and falls in love with her Romeo (Hodge).

== Cast ==
- Gina McKee as Ava
- Douglas Hodge as Simon
- Rob Stewart as Matthew
- Dylan Llewellyn as Jeremy
- Linda Kash as Ros
- Rose Reynolds as Debra

== Production ==
Joan Carr-Wiggin writes and direct the film. It is a joint UK-Canada production and was produced by David Gordian of Paragraph Pictures, and Alan Latham of Highfield Grange Studios. Principal photography started in 2019 in Sault Ste. Marie, Ontario, Canada.
