= Christine Tremarco =

British actress (born 1977)

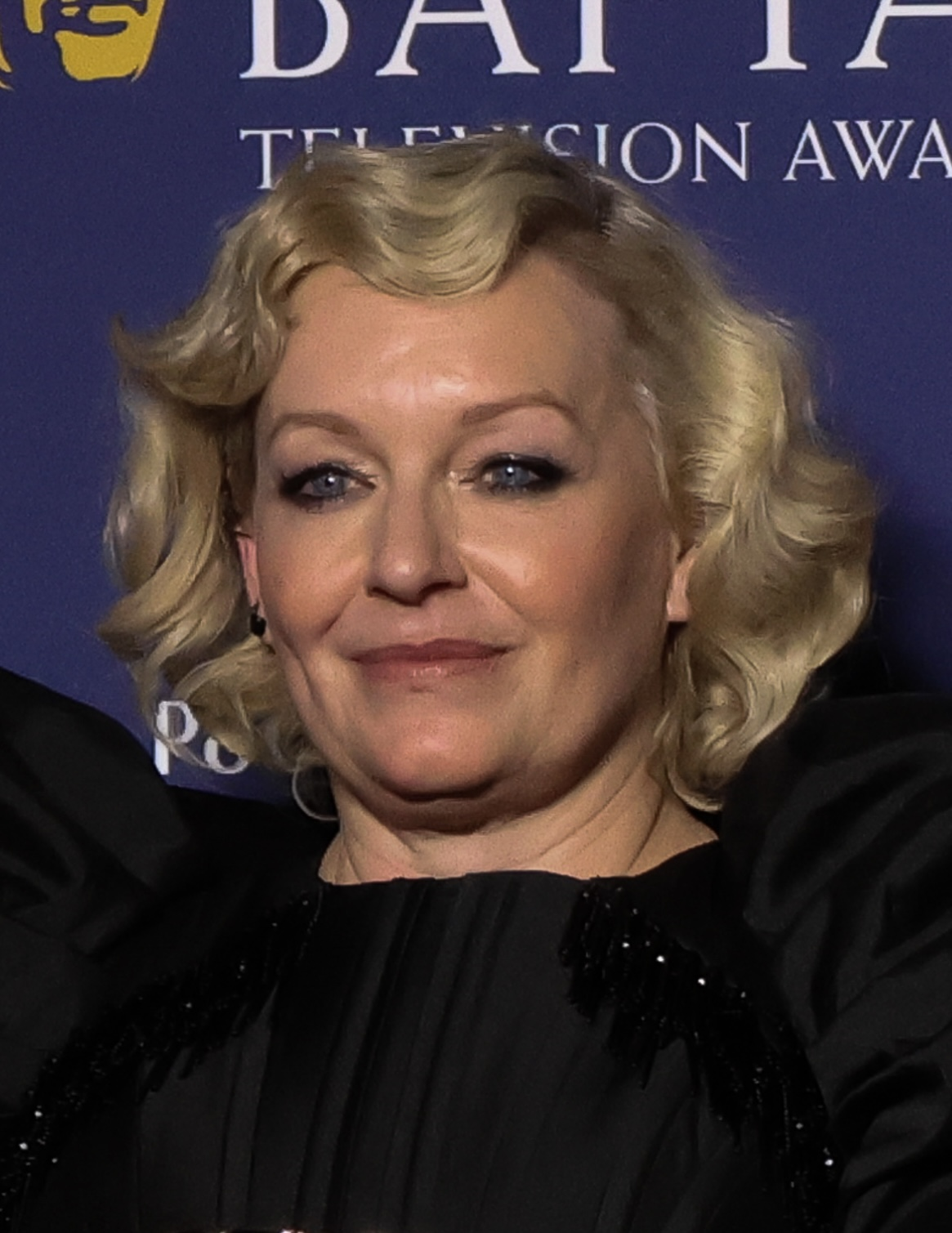
- Tremarco at the 2026 British Academy Television Awards
- Born: 1977 (age 48–49); Liverpool, England
- Occupation: Actress
- Years active: 1992–present

Christine Tremarco (born 1977) is an English actress. Her career began in 1992 when, at the age of 15, she starred in the miniseries The Leaving of Liverpool, for which she was nominated for an AACTA Award. Subsequent television work has included Waterloo Road (2007–2009), Casualty (2010–2013), Little Boy Blue (2017), Clink (2019), Wolfe (2021), and Emmerdale (2024).

For her portrayal of Manda Miller in Adolescence (2025), Tremarco won the British Academy Television Award for Best Supporting Actress, and was nominated for the Primetime Emmy Award for Outstanding Supporting Actress in a Limited or Anthology Series or Movie, Critics' Choice Award for Best Supporting Actress in a Limited Series or Movie Made for Television and Actor Award for Outstanding Performance by a Female Actor in a Miniseries or Television Movie.

Her film credits include Priest (1994), Under the Skin (1997), Face (1997), Anita and Me (2002), and Hector (2015).

== Early life and acting debut ==
Educated at St Cecilia's Catholic Infant and Junior Schools and then Holly Lodge Girls' College, Tremarco was invited to join a newly-opened dance and drama school after being spotted in a school play. Soon thereafter, having caught the attention of a casting agent while performing at a local drama group, she was offered a co-lead role in The Leaving of Liverpool (1993); a two-part television film depicting the forced migration of British children to Australia in the 1950s. For her portrayal of headstrong orphan Lily, Tremarco was nominated for the AACTA Award for Best Lead Actress in a Television Drama.

== Career ==
=== 1990s: Film roles and early work ===
Following her feature film debut in Priest (1994), Tremarco appeared as Trish Freeman in two series of Springhill, a Liverpool-set soap opera created by Paul Abbott, between 1996 and 1997. She then played supporting roles in the British films Under the Skin and Face (both 1997), before starring as Charleen—a victim of incestuous abuse—in Hold Back the Night (1999), with her work being called "impressive" by The Observer. In a similarly positive review, Brian Logan of The Guardian wrote, "[The film's] chief virtue is its star, Christine Tremarco, [who] does teenage rage more viciously than I've ever seen it". That same year, she appeared in the Channel 4 television film Dockers (1999), a BAFTA-nominated drama based on the Liverpool dockers' dispute.

=== 2000–2009: Theatre, film, and Waterloo Road ===
Tremarco's performance in David Harrower's Presence at the Royal Court Theatre in 2001, where she played a German waitress desperate to reinvent herself as American, was well received by critics. Following substantial parts in the films Anita and Me (2002), Gifted (2003), and The Trouble with Men and Women (2005), as well as a key role in the first series of the critically acclaimed BBC/HBO thriller Five Days, she began appearing as Davina Shackleton—a learning support assistant—in the school-based BBC drama Waterloo Road; a role she played from 2007 to 2009. She then starred as Ellie Morgan, a woman facing bankruptcy and forced to sell her home, in an episode of the BBC anthology series Moving On, broadcast in May 2009.

=== 2010–present: Television roles and Adolescence success ===
In January 2010, Tremarco guest-starred in two episodes of the BBC's long-running medical drama series, Casualty. Owing to positive audience feedback, her character—A&E nurse Linda Andrews—was reintroduced as a regular on the show the following year. Upon her departure from Casualty in May 2013, she played supporting roles in the miniseries Glue (2014) and Safe House (2015), had a small part in the 2015 film Hector, and co-starred as Marie Thompson—the parent of a gang member involved in a murder cover-up—in the factual ITV drama Little Boy Blue (2017).

Following a mixture of leading and recurring roles in television series such as Clink (2019), Wolfe (2021), The Responder (2022), and The Gathering (2024), Tremarco joined the cast of ITV's long-running soap opera, Emmerdale, where she appeared as the free-spirited Rose Jackson for four months between April and August 2024.

Tremarco's performance in the four-part crime drama series Adolescence, which debuted on Netflix in March 2025 to record viewing figures, was particularly well received. Writing for The Guardian, Michael Hogan described her work as Manda Miller—a distraught mother reeling from the news that her 13-year-old son has carried out a fatal stabbing—as "heartbreaking"; while Nandini Balial of RogerEbert.com felt she was "a revelation". It was announced in July 2025 that Tremarco had been nominated for a Primetime Emmy Award for her portrayal of Miller. She also won the British Academy Television Award for Best Supporting Actress in 2026.

== Filmography ==
Key
†	Denotes works that have not yet been released

=== Film ===
Year	Film	Role	Notes
1994	Priest	Lisa Unsworth	
1997	Under the Skin	Vron	
1997	Face	Sarah	
1999	Dockers	Paula Walton	Television film
1999	Hold Back the Night	Charleen	
2002	Anita and Me	Sandy	
2003	Gifted	Sharon Harrison	Television film
2003	On the Out	Mirriam	Television film
2004	I'm a Juvenile Delinquent – Jail Me!	Various	Television film
2004	Pretending to Be Judith	Maria	Television film
2005	Uncle Adolf	Eva Braun	Television film
2005	The Trouble with Men and Women	Karen	
2005	Faith	Michelle Andrews	Television film
2006	Trigger Happy	The Girl	Short film
2006	That Summer Day	Music Teacher	Television film
2009	Ingenious	Samantha	Television film
2010	Outcast	Housing Officer	
2015	Hector	Kate	
2016	ID2: Shadwell Army	Alison	
2021	The Pebble and the Boy	Dawn	

=== Television ===
Year	Title	Role	Notes
1993	The Leaving of Liverpool	Lily	Television film
1995	Hearts and Minds	Fifth Former	1 episode
1995	Bordertown	Louise Pearson	Miniseries; 10 episodes
1996–1997	Springhill	Trish Freeman	Recurring; 26 episodes
1997	Heartbeat	Cathy Thompson	Episode: "Leaving Home"
1997	Lloyds Bank Channel 4 Film Challenge	Jane	Episode: "Family Ties"
1998	City Central	Nikki Reed	Recurring; 7 episodes
1998	Coronation Street	Lucy Johnson	1 episode
1998	Trial & Retribution	Cheryl Goodall	2 episodes
1999	Liverpool 1	Michelle	Episode: "Pause for Thought"
1999	Shockers	Deborah	Episode: "The Dance"
2000	The English Programme	Paula Walton	Recurring; 3 episodes
2000	Clocking Off	Katherine Mackintosh	Recurring; 4 episodes
2001	Swallow	Lorraine Landry	Miniseries; 3 episodes
2001–2002	Nice Guy Eddie	Ange McMullen	Series regular; 7 episodes
2002	Night Flight	Pam Atwell	Miniseries
2003	Casualty	Sarah Jennings	Episode: "Against Protocol"
2003	Real Men	Paula Savage	Miniseries; 2 episodes
2003	Coming Up	Rachel	Episode: "Loveless"
2004	Family Business	Lisa	1 episode
2004–2005	Fat Friends	Clare	2 episodes
2005	The Rotters' Club	Miriam Newman	Miniseries; 2 episodes
2005	Donovan	Sharon Paige	1 episode
2005	The Ghost Squad	Jo Miller	Episode: "One of Us"
2006	New Street Law	Judy Richards	Episode: "To the Naked Eye"
2006	Dalziel and Pascoe	Nerissa Barron	Episode: "The Cave Woman"
2007	Five Days	Leanne Wellings	2 episodes
2007	New Tricks	Christy Berlin	Episode: "Big Topped"
2007–2009	Waterloo Road	Davina Shackleton	Series regular; 44 episodes
2009	Moving On	Ellie Morgan	Episode: "Drowning Not Waving"
2010–2013	Casualty	Linda Andrews	Series regular; 73 episodes
2011	Silent Witness	Sonia Hardwick	Episode: "Lost"
2011	Justice	Marie	Episode: "This Town"
2012	Good Cop	Nurse Justine	Miniseries; 4 episodes
2013	Talking to the Dead	DC Eluned Jones	Miniseries; 2 episodes
2014	Glue	Nadya	Miniseries; 4 episodes
2015	Safe House	Becky	Miniseries; 4 episodes
2017	Little Boy Blue	Marie Thompson	Miniseries; 4 episodes
2019	Clink	Sinead Kovac	Series regular; 10 episodes
2020	Tin Star	Carrie McGrath	Episode: "Collateral"
2021	Wolfe	Betsy Chambers	Series regular; 6 episodes
2022	The Responder	Dr. Diane Gallagher	Recurring; 3 episodes
2022	The Window	Teresa Burdett	Recurring; 8 episodes
2024	The Gathering	Carianne	Recurring; 6 episodes
2024	Kidnapped: The Chloe Ayling Story	Bea	Miniseries; 2 episodes
2024	Emmerdale	Rose Jackson	Series regular
2025	Adolescence	Manda Miller	Miniseries; 2 episodes
