= Darren Curtis =

Canadian actor, screenwriter and filmmaker

Darren Curtis is a Canadian actor, screenwriter and filmmaker. He is most noted for his 2016 film Boost, for which he received three Prix Iris nominations for Best Film, Best Director and Best Screenplay at the 20th Quebec Cinema Awards in 2018.

A graduate of Concordia University, Curtis was a member of the Montreal sketch comedy troupe Kidnapper Films. Curtis and Pat Kiely debuted in 2008 as co-writers, co-directors and co-stars of the comedy film Who Is KK Downey?.

He has also directed episodes of the comedy web series Yidlife Crisis, and has appeared as an actor in the television series The Business and The Bitter End, and the films The Trotsky and Three Night Stand.
