= Valerie Mahaffey =

American actress (1953–2025)

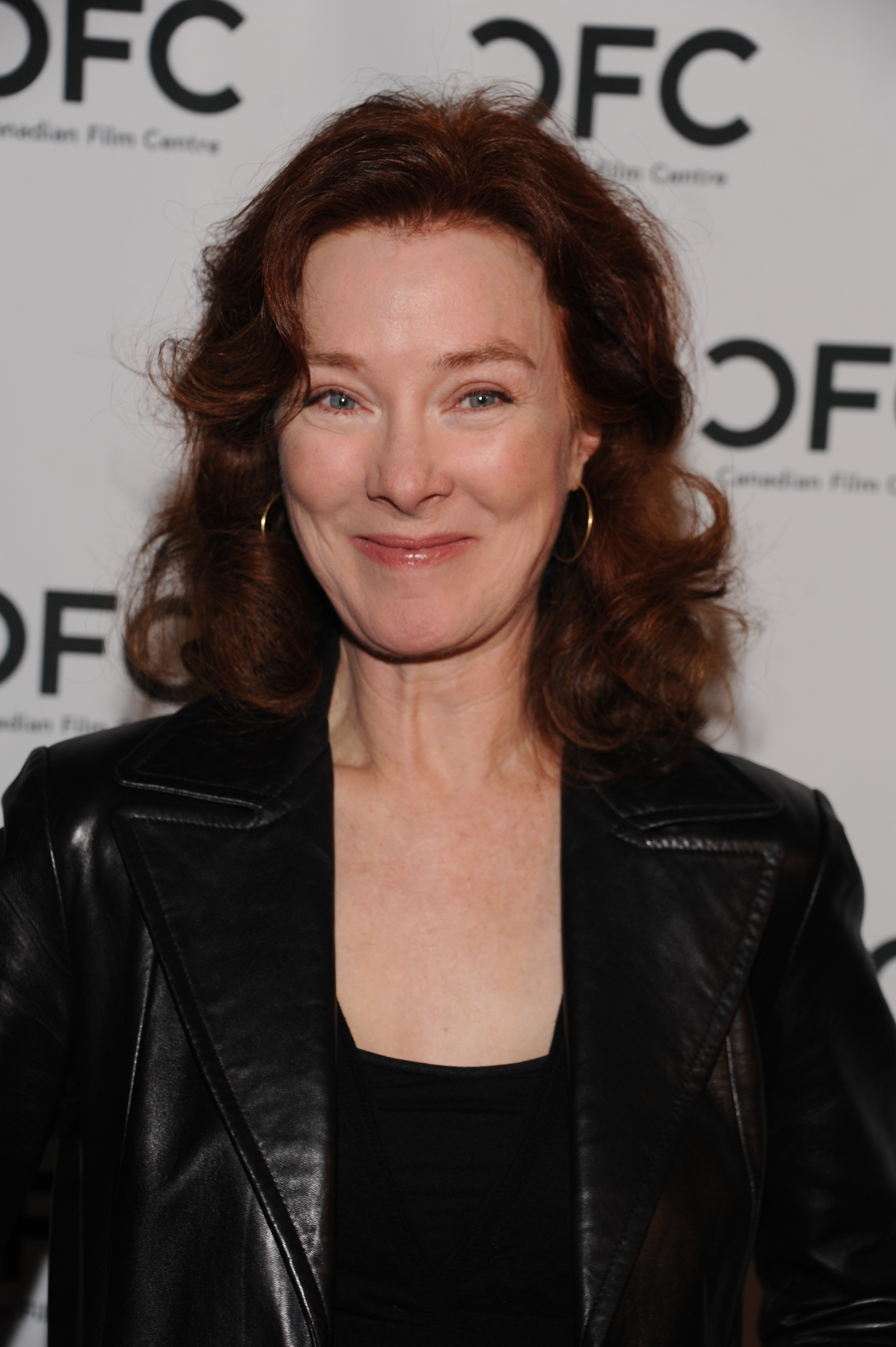
- Mahaffey in 2012
- Born: June 16, 1953; Sumatra, Indonesia
- Died: May 30, 2025 (aged 71); Los Angeles, California, U.S.
- Education: University of Texas at Austin (BFA)
- Occupation: Actress
- Years active: 1976–2025
- Known for: Northern Exposure; The Doctors
- Spouse: Joseph Kell
- Children: 1

Valerie Mahaffey (June 16, 1953 – May 30, 2025) was a Canadian-American actress. She began her career starring in the NBC daytime soap opera The Doctors (1979–81), for which in 1980 she was nominated for the Daytime Emmy Award for Outstanding Supporting Actress in a Drama Series.

In 1992, Mahaffey won the Primetime Emmy Award for Outstanding Supporting Actress in a Drama Series for her role in the CBS drama series Northern Exposure. She later appeared in television shows such as Wings, Desperate Housewives, Devious Maids, Young Sheldon, and Dead to Me. Mahaffey also appeared in a number of movies, including Senior Trip (1995), Jungle 2 Jungle (1997), Jack and Jill (2011), Sully (2016). For her role in French Exit (2020) she received critical acclaim and an Independent Spirit Award nomination.

== Early life ==
Mahaffey was born on June 16, 1953, in Sumatra, Indonesia, to a Canadian mother and an American father who met in New Brunswick, Canada. Her father worked in the petroleum industry, and the family moved frequently for his career; Mahaffey spent her early years in Indonesia, Nigeria, and the United Kingdom. When she was 16, her family relocated to Austin, Texas, where she graduated from Austin High School. She earned a Bachelor of Fine Arts from the University of Texas at Austin in 1975 and later made her Broadway debut in the musical Rex.

== Career ==
Mahaffey was a regular cast member in the soap opera The Doctors from 1979 to 1981, which earned her a nomination for Daytime Emmy Award for Outstanding Supporting Actress in a Drama Series in 1980. She starred in the film Women of Valor in 1986 and while the characters are fictitious, it portrayed women's roles in the Philippines during World War II. Also in 1986 Mahaffey co-starred in the cult satirical TV miniseries Fresno, which parodied popular TV soaps of the day.

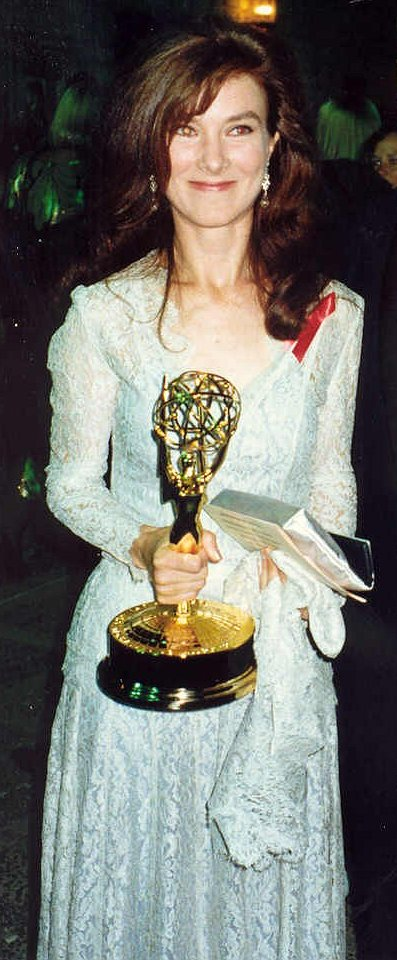
Valerie Mahaffey at the Governor's Ball after the 1992 Emmy Awards

In the late 1980s, Mahaffey began acting in television comedies, like Newhart, Cheers, and Seinfeld. From 1992 to 1993, she starred in the short-lived NBC sitcom The Powers That Be and in the CBS sitcom Women of the House alongside Delta Burke in 1995. She played Tracy Milford in the 1995 film National Lampoon's Senior Trip and Jan Kempster in the 1997 film Jungle 2 Jungle. In 1999, she had a recurring role on ER. In 2003, she co-starred in the film Seabiscuit. In 2009, she appeared in seven episodes of Showtime comedy series United States of Tara. Her stage credits include Eastern Standard, Talking Heads, Top Girls, and Rex.

Mahaffey won the Primetime Emmy Award for Outstanding Supporting Actress in a Drama Series for her performance as the chronic hypochondriac Eve in the CBS series Northern Exposure in 1992.

Mahaffey played Alma Hodge in season 3 of ABC comedy-drama series Desperate Housewives from 2006 to 2007. Mahaffey made guest appearances on Quantum Leap, L.A. Law, Ally McBeal, Judging Amy, The West Wing, Law & Order: Special Victims Unit, Frasier, Wings, CSI: Crime Scene Investigation, Private Practice, Boston Legal, Without a Trace, and Raising Hope. She appeared on Glee as the mother of Emma Pillsbury from 2011 to 2013. Mahaffey co-starred as Fran Horowitz in short-lived TNT medical drama Monday Mornings in 2013. From 2013 to 2015, she had a recurring role on the Lifetime Television comedy-drama series Devious Maids as Olivia Rice.

In 2016, Mahaffey played a supporting role as Diane Higgins in the biographical drama film Sully directed by Clint Eastwood. In 2017, she began appearing in a recurring role in the CBS comedy series Young Sheldon. From 2019 to 2022, Mahaffey had a recurring role as Lorna Harding, Christina Applegate's mother-in-law in the Netflix comedy-drama series Dead to Me.

In 2020, Mahaffey starred opposite Michelle Pfeiffer in the comedy-drama film French Exit playing widow Madame Reynaud. Mahaffey received positive reviews from critics for her scene-stealing comedic performance in the film. Later in 2020, Mahaffey was cast in a series regular role in the first season of the ABC crime drama series Big Sky.

== Personal life and death ==
Mahaffey was married to actor and director Joseph Kell, with whom she had a daughter.

Mahaffey died of cancer on May 30, 2025, at the age of 71.

== Filmography ==
=== Film ===
Year	Title	Role	Notes
1996	Senior Trip	Miss Tracy Milford	
1997	Jungle 2 Jungle	Jan Kempster	
1999	Dinner at Fred's	Susan	
2002	Par 6	Pecan Hegelman	
2003	Seabiscuit	Annie Howard	
2006	My First Wedding	Grace	
2008	A Previous Engagement	Grace	
2010	Summer Eleven	Linda	Also producer
2011	Jack and Jill	Bitsy Simmons	
2012	If I Were You	Lydia	
2012	Crazy Eyes	Mo	
2015	No Pay, Nudity	Lisa	
2016	Sully	Diane Higgins	
2018	The Witch Files	Claire's mom	
2020	French Exit	Madame Reynaud	Nominated—Independent Spirit Award for Best Supporting Female
2025	The 8th Day	Landon Mooney	
TBA	GRQ the Movie	Aunt Emily	Completed

=== Television ===
Year	Title	Role	Notes
1977	Tell Me My Name	Alexandra/Sarah	Television film
1979–1981	The Doctors	Ashley Bennett	Nominated—Daytime Emmy Award for Outstanding Supporting Actress in a Drama Series (1980)
1984	Tales of the Unexpected	Jane	Episode: "The Open Window"
1986	Mr. Bill's Real Life Adventures	Mrs. Bill	TV short
1986	American Playhouse	Alice	Episode: "The Rise and Rise of Daniel Rocket"
1986	Fresno	Tiffany Kensington	TV mini-series
1986	Women of Valor	Lt. Katherine R. Grace	Television film
1987	Newhart	Jolene	Episode: "Love Letters in the Mud"
1987	Jack and Mike	Colleen	Episode: "Till Death Do Us Part"
1989	Perry Mason: The Case of the Musical Murder	D.A. Barbara August	Television film
1989	Perry Mason: The Case of the All-Star Assassin	D.A. Barbara August	Television film
1990	An Enemy of the People	Mrs. Stockman	Television film
1990	Father Dowling Mysteries	Justine Hemmings	Episode: "The Solid Gold Headache Mystery"
1990	Quantum Leap	Mary Greely	Episode: "The Boogieman – October 31, 1964"
1991	Cheers	Valerie Hill	Episode: "Achilles Hill"
1991	The Young Riders	Lottie	Episode: "The Talisman"
1991	Baby Talk	Tammy Morrison	Episode: "One Night with Elliot"
1991	Seinfeld	Patrice	Episode: "The Truth"
1991–1994	Northern Exposure	Eve	5 episodes Primetime Emmy Award for Outstanding Supporting Actress in a Drama Series (1992)
1992	Till Death Us Do Part	Gail Bugliosi	Television film
1992	Dream On	Helen Harley	Episode: "Up All Night"
1992–1993	The Powers That Be	Caitlyn Van Horne	21 episodes
1993	They	Chris Samuels	Television film
1993–1996	Wings	Sandy Cooper	3 episodes
1994	L.A. Law	Andrea Rossoff	Episode: "Cold Cuts"
1994	Witch Hunt	Trudy	Television film
1995	Women of the House	Jennifer Malone	6 episodes
1995–1996	The Client	Ellie Foltrigg	4 episodes
1996	Caroline in the City	Alicia Crawford-Lane	Episode: "Caroline and the Therapist"
1997	George & Leo	Martha	Episode: "The Thanksgiving Show"
1999	ER	Joi Abbott	4 episodes
2000	Love & Money	Gloria Barrell	Episode: "Guess Who's Paying for Dinner"
2000	Ally McBeal	Dr. Sally Muggins	Episode: "I Will Survive"
2001	That's My Bush!	Janet Rove	Episode: "Trapped in a Small Environment"
2001	Night Visions	Sally Osgoode	Episode: "Neighborhood Watch"
2001	After Amy	Virginia Hytner	Television film
2001	Judging Amy	Ms. Morlock	Episode: "The Unbearable Lightness of Being Family"
2001	The West Wing	Tawny Cryer, Appropriations Committee	Episode: "Gone Quiet"
2002	Law & Order: Special Victims Unit	Brook Thornburg	Episode: "Justice"
2003	Frasier	Peggy	Episode: "Maris Returns"
2004	Without a Trace	Bonnie Toland	Episode: "Shadows"
2005	Out of Practice	Barb	Episode: "...and I'll Cry If I Want to"
2006	Crumbs	Carolyn Pierce	Episode: "Friends in High Places"
2006	CSI: Crime Scene Investigation	Dora Pomerantz	Episode: "Happenstance"
2006–2007, 2012	Desperate Housewives	Alma Hodge	9 episodes
2007	Raines	Arlene	Episode: "Pilot"
2007	Private Practice	Marilyn Sullivan	Episode: "In Which Charlotte Goes Down the Rabbit Hole"
2008	Boston Legal	Mary Winston	Episode: "Mad About You"
2009	United States of Tara	Dr. Ocean	7 episodes
2010	Better with You	Ariel	Episode: "Better with Road Joel"
2010	Hannah Montana	Ms. Jameson	Episode: "I'll Always Remember You"
2010	Raising Hope	Margine	Episode: "Meet the Grandparents"
2011–2013	Glee	Rose Pillsbury	3 episodes
2012	The Exes	Anne	Episode: "He's Gotta Have It"
2013	Monday Mornings	Fran Horowitz	6 episodes
2013, 2015	Devious Maids	Olivia Rice	8 episodes
2013	Grey's Anatomy	Donna Kaufman	Episode: "Somebody That I Used to Know"
2014	Kirstie	Victoria	Episode: "The Dinner Party"
2014	Hart of Dixie	Mae	3 episodes
2015	Workaholics	Celeste	Episode: "Blood Drive"
2015	Impastor	Susie Kerry	Episode: "Honor Thy Boyfriend's Father and Mother"
2016	The Mindy Project	Juliet	Episode: "So You Think You Can Finance"
2017	The Man in the High Castle	Susan	Recurring role, 3 episodes
2017–2020	Young Sheldon	Ms. MacElroy	Recurring role, 14 episodes
2019–2022	Dead to Me	Lorna Harding	Recurring role, 9 episodes
2020–2021	Big Sky	Helen Pergman	Main role (season 1), 9 episodes
2022	Echo 3	Maggie Chesborough	3 episodes

=== Theatre ===
Year	Title	Role	Notes
1976	Rex	Catherine Howard	Lunt-Fontanne Theatre, Broadway
1977	Dracula	Lucy Seward (Replacement)	Martin Beck Theatre, Broadway
1978	Romeo and Juliet	Juliet	Milwaukee Repertory Theater
1978	The Freeway	Payne	Milwaukee Repertory Theater
1980	Fearless Frank	Jessie/Lilly	Princess Theatre, Broadway
1981	Scenes and Revelations	Rebecca	Circle in the Square Theatre, Broadway
1981	Twelve Dreams	Miss Banton	The Public Theater, Off-Broadway
1982	Ethan Frome	Mattie Silver	Long Wharf Theatre
1982	The Keeper	Lady Byron	Philadelphia Drama Guild
1982	The Butter and Egg Man	Jane Weston	Manhattan Punch Line Theater
1983	Top Girls	Patient Griselda	The Public Theater, Off-Broadway
1984	Play Memory	Jean MacMillan	Longacre Theatre, Broadway
1984	Romance Language	Emily Dickinson	Playwrights Horizons, Off-Broadway
1985	The Loves of Anatol	Annette/Annie	Circle in the Square Theatre, Broadway
1988	Eastern Standard	Phoebe Kidde	Seattle Repertory Theatre
2003	Talking Heads	Lesley	Minetta Lane Theatre, Off-Broadway
2016	Casa Valentina	Rita	Pasadena Playhouse
