= Sweet Kind of Blue =

Studio album by Emily Barker
- Released: 19 May 2017
- Studio: Phillips Recording (Memphis, Tennessee)
- Length: 38:10
- Label: Everyone Sang
- Producer: Matt Ross-Spang

Emily Barker chronology
The Toerag Sessions (2015)	Sweet Kind of Blue (2017)

Singles from Sweet Kind of Blue
- 1. "Sister Goodbye" Released: 10 February 2017; 2. "Sunrise" Released: 17 March 2017; 3. "Change" Released: 19 January 2018; 4. "More!" Released: 22 June 2018

Professional ratings
Aggregate scores
Source	Rating
Metacritic	81/100
Review scores
Source	Rating
Gigsoup	77%

Sweet Kind of Blue is the third studio album by Australian singer-songwriter Emily Barker. It was released on 19 May 2019 through Everyone Sang Records.

The album was nominated at the 2018 Americana Music Association for Best Album of the Year.

== Track listing ==
Sweet Kind of Blue track listing
No.	Title	Length
1.	"Sweet Kind of Blue"	3:36
2.	"Sister Goodbye"	4:08
3.	"Sunrise"	3:41
4.	"No. 5 Hurricane"	4:52
5.	"If We Forget to Dance"	5:07
6.	"Crazy Life"	3:57
7.	"Over My Shoulder"	4:07
8.	"Change"	3:31
9.	"More!"	2:43
10.	"Underneath the Honey Moon"	3:00
Total length:		38:10

iTunes deluxe edition
No.	Title	Length
1.	"Sweet Kind of Blue"	3:36
2.	"Sister Goodbye"	4:08
3.	"Sunrise"	3:41
4.	"No. 5 Hurricane"	4:52
5.	"If We Forget to Dance"	5:07
6.	"Crazy Life"	3:57
7.	"Over My Shoulder"	4:07
8.	"Change"	3:31
9.	"More!"	2:43
10.	"Underneath the Honey Moon"	3:00
11.	"Precious Memories"	2:49
12.	"Blood Moon"	4:50
13.	"Tomorrow Be Now" (featuring Glen Phillips)	2:51
14.	"Hold On (Don't Let Me See This Night Alone)" (featuring Romeo Stodart)	3:49
15.	"Black and White Video"	4:03
16.	"Sunrise" (extended version)	8:00
17.	"Sister Goodbye" (acoustic)	3:38
18.	"No. 5 Hurricane" (acoustic)	4:47
Total length:		72:57

== Charts ==
Chart performance of Sweet Kind of Blue
Chart (2017)	Peak position
UK Albums (OCC)	83
