= Better Days (2023 film) =

Canadian comedy-drama film

- Directed by: Joan Carr-Wiggin
- Screenplay by: Joan Carr-Wiggin
- Produced by: David Gordian
- Starring: Sonja Smits; Alix Sideris; Dean Armstrong
- Cinematography: Matt Phillips
- Production company: Paragraph Pictures
- Distributed by: Gravitas Ventures
- Release date: September 19, 2023 (Cinéfest)
- Running time: 99 minutes
- Country: Canada
- Language: English

Better Days is a Canadian comedy-drama film, directed by Joan Carr-Wiggin and released in 2022. The film stars Sonja Smits as Kate, a woman who is discovering new sides of herself after the death of her husband.

The cast also includes Alix Sideris, Dean Armstrong, Luke Atteledon-Francis, Gregory Ambrose Calderone, Kerrin Cochrane, Sara Hinding, Darius Rathe, Sugenja Sri, Tania Webb and Blair Williams.

The film premiered on September 19, 2023, at the 2023 Cinéfest Sudbury International Film Festival.

Mykola Korolyov received a Canadian Screen Award nomination for Best Hair at the 12th Canadian Screen Awards in 2024.
