= Love of My Life (2017 film) =

- Directed by: Joan Carr-Wiggin
- Written by: Joan Carr-Wggin
- Starring: Anna Chancellor; John Hannah
- Cinematography: Bruce Worrall
- Release date: 17 February 2017
- Running time: 1h 46min
- Country: Canada
- Language: English

Love of My Life is a 2017 Canadian comedy film directed by Joan Carr-Wiggin.

== Cast ==
- Anna Chancellor as Grace
- John Hannah as Richard
- Hermione Norris as Tamara
- James Fleet as Tom
- Katie Boland as Zoe
- Hannah Anderson as Kaitlyn
- Scott Cavalheiro as Will

== Reception ==
On Rotten Tomatoes, the film has an approval rating of 17% based on 6 reviews, with an average rating of 3.30/10.

Simran Hans of The Observer gave the film 1/5 stars, writing: "Unfortunately, even Chancellor, so brilliant and sharp as Lix Storm in BBC2's newsroom drama The Hour, can't save this undignified affair, gritting her teeth through writer-director Carr-Wiggin's cringeworthy script." Kevin Maher of The Times also gave the film 1/5 stars, calling it "a baffling, breathtakingly inept rom-com that plays like a horrifying cross-fertilisation of Richard Curtis comedies with Robin Askwith sex films." Mike McCahill of The Guardian gave the film 2/5 stars, writing: "The actors strive to give it spark and emotional amplitude, but the script barely seems to understand how humans exist hour-by-hour, let alone in moments of mortal crisis."
