= Emily Barker =

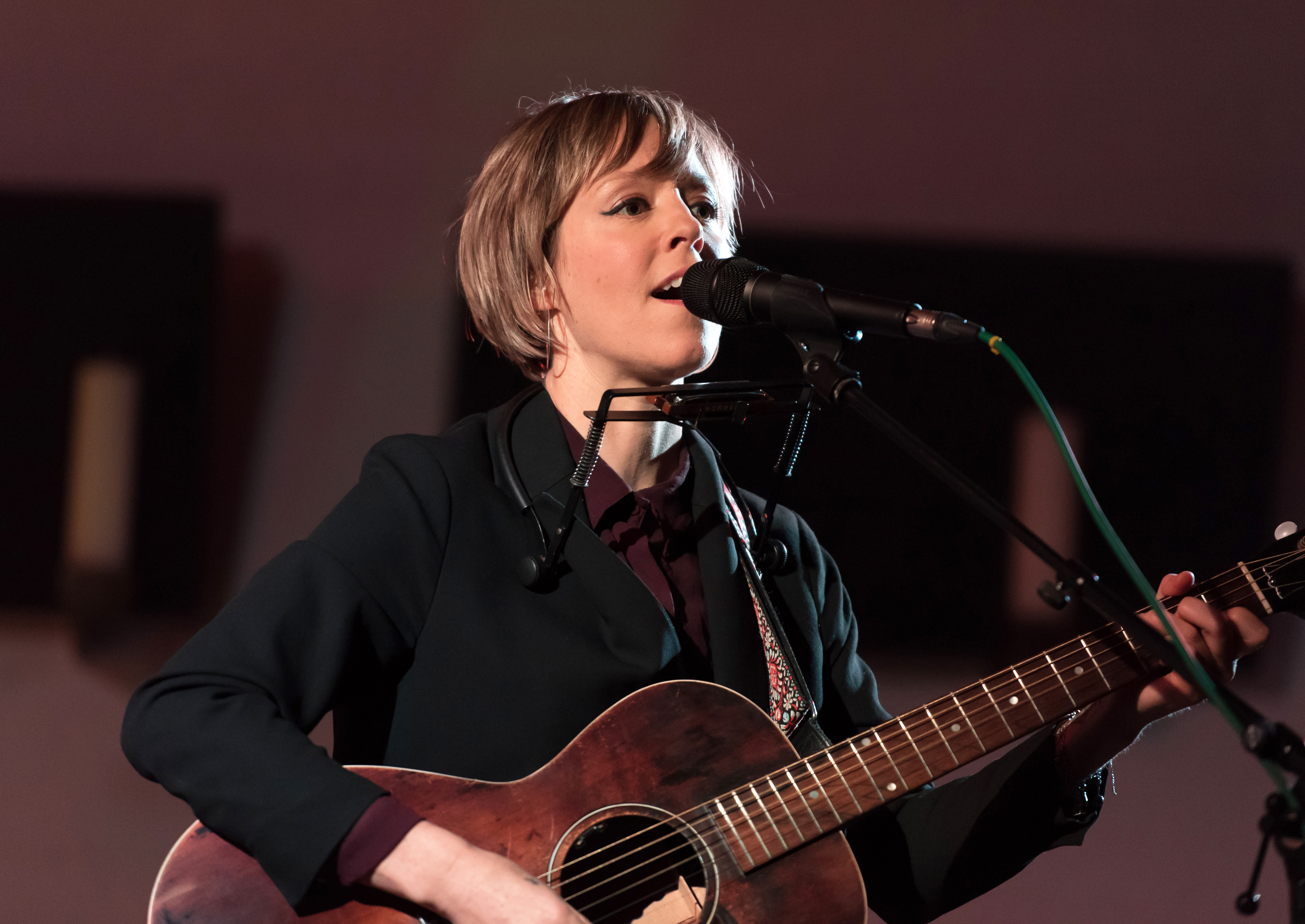
- Emily Barker at Lottes Musiknacht 2018

Background information
- Born: 2 December 1980 (age 45)
- Origin: Bridgetown, Western Australia, Australia
- Genres: Americana; country; folk
- Occupations: Musician; singer-songwriter; composer
- Instruments: Vocals; guitar; banjo; harmonica; piano
- Years active: 2003–present
- Labels: Everyone Sang; Linn; One Little Indian
- Website: www.emilybarker.com

Emily Barker (born 2 December 1980) is an Australian singer-songwriter, musician and composer. Her music has featured as the theme to BBC dramas Wallander and The Shadow Line. With multi-instrumental trio the Red Clay Halo, she recorded four albums: Photos.Fires.Fables. (2006), Despite the Snow (2008), Almanac (2011), Dear River (2013), before commencing a solo career with The Toerag Sessions (2015), Sweet Kind of Blue (2017), A Dark Murmuration of Words (2020), and Flight Path Rhymes (2021). Other projects include Vena Portae (with Dom Coyote and Ruben Engzell), Applewood Road (with Amy Speace and Amber Rubarth), and Room 822 (2022) with Lukas Drinkwater.

== Career ==
=== 2002–2005: The Low Country ===
Emily travelled to the UK in 2002, and was first based in Cambridge where she collaborated with guitarist Rob Jackson. They formed a band called The Low Country which released two albums, Welcome to the-low-country (2003) and The Dark Road (2004), tracks from which enjoyed plays on John Peel's BBC radio show.

In 2005 Emily won Country Song of the Year and Regional Song of the Year awards at the annual West Australian Music Songwriting Awards.

=== 2006–2013: Emily Barker & the Red Clay Halo ===
In 2006, Barker released her first solo album, Photos. Fires. Fables. before releasing albums under the alias Emily Barker & the Red Clay Halo.

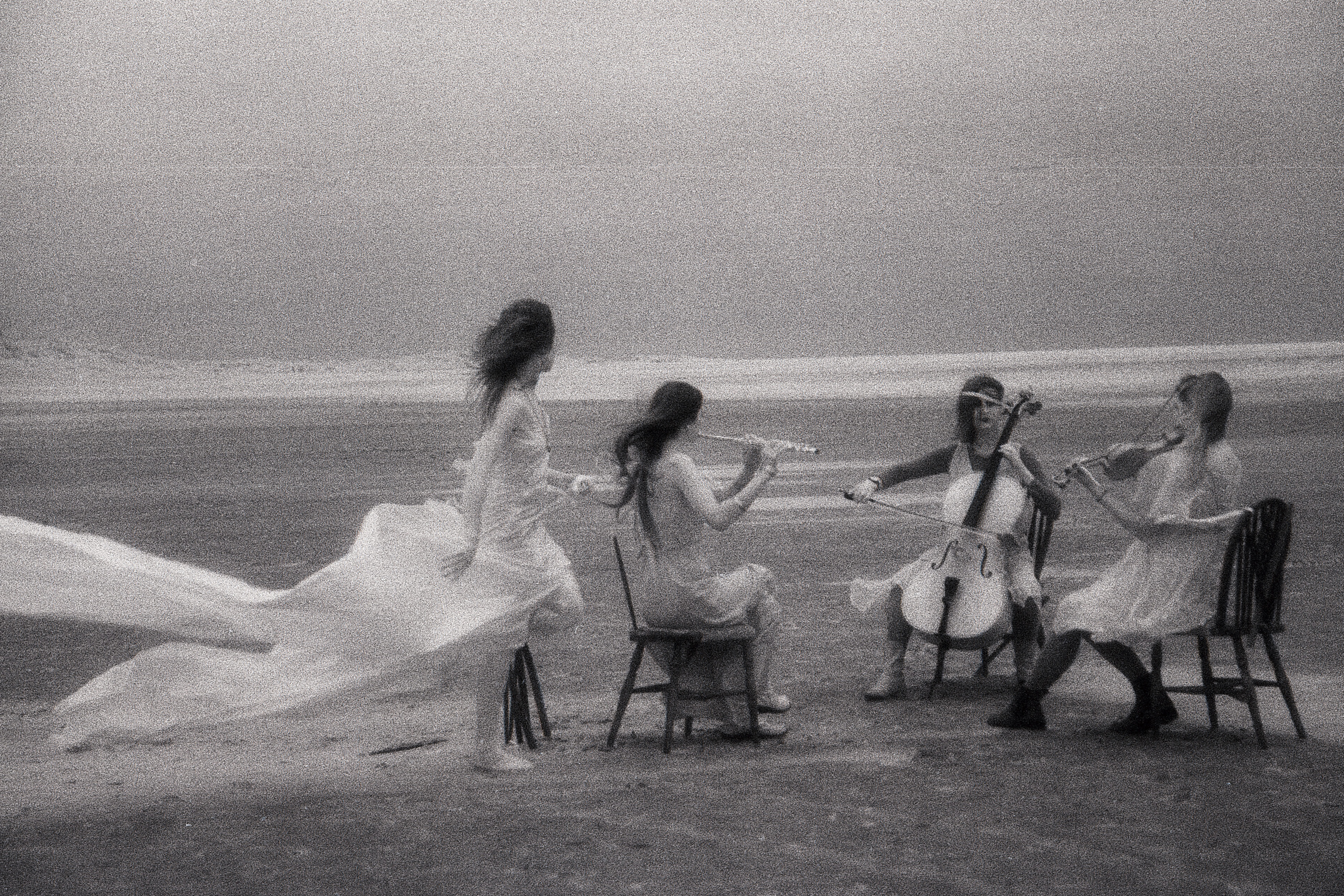
Emily Barker & the Red Clay Halo filming the video for "Little Deaths"

The song "Pause - The Shadow Line" from Almanac was the theme tune for a major 2011 BBC2 drama serial, The Shadow Line and received a physical release. Martin Phipps again adapted the song for the title sequence.

In 2012, Barker recorded a new version of "Fields of June", which had first appeared on Photos.Fires.Fables. and was released as a limited 7-inch white vinyl on Xtra Mile Recordings.

In July 2013, Dear River was released, charting at 99 in the official UK Albums chart. Will Hodgkinson from The Times gave the album a four out of five star review, saying it contained "heartfelt songwriting... bridging the gap between folk, country and Fleetwood Mac".

=== 2014-present: Solo success ===
In 2014, Barker worked with Dom Coyote and Ruben Engzell and created Vena Portae.

In 2015, release the EP Anywhere Away which was the soundtrack to the UK movie Hector, released in December 2015.

In May 2017, Barker released Sweet Kind of Blue which peaked at number 88 on the UK Albums Chart.

In 2020, Barker released A Dark Murmuration of Words. This album was inspired by a concern with the impact of climate change on the natural world. Barker explained, "Last year the climate crisis was very much at the forefront of all of our conversations and thoughts, wondering what we can do to adapt, and feeling helpless and guilty and angry and upset and all these things."

In an interview with Bernard Zuel, Emily Barker elaborated saying, "It was really a response to a lot of what was going on in 2019 with the collective awakening of the environmental crisis. And it was terrifying. It's something that I'd been aware of before, and I was brought up by parents who were very conscious of that anyway, but I think a lot of people really looked at the personal impact in a big way and started realising the scale of this emergency. It's so hard to compute but for me, writing songs helps me to make sense of things that I can't process."

In 2020, Barker covered the Billy Bragg song "Can't Be There Today" as part of a campaign to save musical venues during the COVID-19 crisis.

In 2021, Barker released an alternative version of A Dark Murmuration of Words in 2021 – called Flight Path Rhymes. She discussed the reworking of the album saying "Recording A Dark Murmuration of Words was a wonderful immersive experience that involved my live band and multiple conversations with producer Greg Freeman. It was only as the album was coming together that I realised how all the songs intertwined...how, despite their different subjects, there was an underlying theme that tied them all together."

In January 2022, Emily Barker and Lukas Drinkwater released an album of covers called Room 822.

== Discography ==
=== Studio albums ===
List of studio albums, with selected chart positions
Title	Details	Peak chart positions	
Title	Details	UK	UK Indie
Credited as The Low Country (with Rob W. Jackson)
Welcome To...	Released: 2003; Label: Now Recordings (NOW2003CD); Formats: CD	—	—
The Dark Road	Released: 2004; Label: the-low-country (LOW-CO-02); Formats: CD	—	—
Credited as Emily Barker
Photos. Fires. Fables.	Released: 2006; Label: Iguana Productions (IP006) / Everyone Sang (ES2007); Formats: CD, digital download	—	—
Credited as Emily Barker & The Red Clay Halo
Despite the Snow	Released: 2008; Label: Walking Horse (WALK002) / Everyone Sang (ES2008); Formats: CD, digital download, LP (2016)	—	—
Almanac	Released: 2011; Label: Walking Horse (WALK015) / Everyone Sang (ES2011); Formats: CD, LP, digital download	—	37
Dear River	Released: July 2013; Label: Linn Records (AKD 505); Formats: 2xCD, LP, digital download	99	23
Credited as Vena Portae (with Dom Coyote and Ruben Engzell)
Vena Portae	Released: August 2014; Label: Humble Soul Records (HS418CD); Formats: 2xCD, LP, digital download	— (Note: Vena Portae did not enter the Official Charts top 100, but peaked at number 89 on the Physical Albums Chart.)	26
Credited as Emily Barker
The Toerag Sessions	Released: April 2015; Label: Everyone Sang (ES143); Formats: CD, CD+DVD, digital download	—	25
Credited as Applewood Road (with Amber Rubarth and Amy Speace)
Applewood Road	Released: February 2016; Label: Gearbox (GB1531CD); Formats: CD, LP, digital download	— (Note: Applewood Road did not enter the Official Charts top 100, but peaked at number 99 on the Physical Albums Chart.)	19
Credited as Emily Barker
Sweet Kind of Blue	Released: May 2017; Label: Everyone Sang (ES153); Formats: CD, 2xCD, LP, digital download	83	11
A Window to Other Ways (with Marry Waterson)	Released: April 2019; Label: One Little Indian (TPLP1482); Formats: CD, LP, digital download	— (Note: A Window to Other Ways did not enter the Official Charts top 100, but peaked at number 77 on the Physical Albums Chart.)	—
A Dark Murmuration of Words	Released: September 2020; Label: Everyone Sang (ES158); Formats: CD, LP, digital download	— (Note: A Dark Murmuration of Words did not enter the Official Charts top 100, but peaked at number 23 on the Physical Albums Chart.)	7
Flight Path Rhymes	Released: 2021; Label: Everyone Sang (ES159); Formats: CD, digital download; Note: an alternative version of A Dark Murmuration of Words	—	—
Room 822 (with Lukas Drinkwater)	Released: January 2022; Label: Emily Barker and Lukas Drinkwater; Formats: digital download; Recorded during hotel quarantine in Room 822 at The Westin, Perth.	—	—
Fragile As Humans	Released: May 2024; Label: Everyone Sang (ES163); Formats: CD, LP, digital download	— (Note: Fragile As Humans did not enter the Official Charts top 100, but peaked at number 36 on the Physical Albums Chart.)	13

=== Live albums ===
List of live albums, with selected chart positions
Title	Details
Credited as Emily Barker & The Red Clay Halo
Live At Swindon Arts Centre	Released: 2014; Label: Emily Barker; Formats: digital download; Recorded November 2011
Credited as Emily Barker
Live At Brunel Goods Shed	Released: October 2022; Label: Everyone Sang (ES160); Formats: CD, digital download; Recorded November 2020

=== Compilations ===
List of compilation albums, with selected chart positions
Title	Details	Peak chart positions	
Title	Details	UK	UK Indie
Credited as Emily Barker
Shadow Box	Released: November 2019; Label: Everyone Sang (ES157CD); Formats: CD, digital download; Compiles Songs Beneath The River, 5x tracks Live At Union Chapel and 7x tracks Pebbles, Shells And Other Memories	— (Note: Shadow Box did not enter the Official Charts top 100, but peaked at number 6 on the Americana Chart.)	32

=== Extended Plays ===
List of EPs, with selected chart positions
Title	Details	Peak chart positions
Title	Details	UK Indi
Four Songs	Released: 2005; Label: digital download; Formats: CD; Note: UK Promotional release	—
Credited as Emily Barker & The Red Clay Halo
Despite the Snow	Released: July 2012; Label: Everyone Sang (ES141); Formats: CDr, digital download, 10" LP (2014 RSD exclusive)	38
Credited as Emily Barker
Coffee	Released: February 2013; Label: Everyone Sang; Formats: digital download; Note: Originally recorded to accompany the Square Mile-roasted Dear River coffee beans sold on the Dear River UK tour.	—
Credited as Emily Barker & The Red Clay Halo
Songs Beneath the River	Released: 2014; Label: Everyone Sang (ES141V); Formats: 10″ Vinyl (limited edition)	—
Credited as Emily Barker
Anywhere Away	Released: 2015; Label: Everyone Sang; Formats: CD, digital download; Note: Recorded as soundtrack to Hector	—

=== Charted singles ===
List of singles, with selected chart positions
Title	Year	Chart positions	Album
Title	Year	UK Physical	Album
Credited as Emily Barker and The Red Clay Halo
"Pause - The Shadow Line"	2011	(Note: "Pause - The Shadow Line" did not enter the Official Charts top 100, but peaked at number 15 on the Independent Single Chart.)	Almanac
Credited as Emily Barker and The Red Clay
"Fields of June"	2012	24	

== Awards and nominations ==
=== Environmental Music Prize ===
The Environmental Music Prize is a quest to find a theme song to inspire action on climate and conservation. It commenced in 2022.

Year	Nominee / work	Award	Result	Ref.
2025	"Feathered Thing"	Environmental Music Prize	Nominated	

=== WAM Song of the Year ===
The WAM Song of the Year was formed by the Western Australian Rock Music Industry Association Inc. (WARMIA) in 1985, with its main aim to develop and run annual awards recognising achievements within the music industry in Western Australia.

Year	Nominee / work	Award	Result (wins only)
2005	"Lord I Want an Exit"	Country Song of the Year	Won
2005	"Lord I Want an Exit"	Regional Song of the Year	Won
