= The Leaving of Liverpool (TV series) =

- Genre: Drama
- Written by: John Alsop (part 1); Sue Smith (part 2)
- Directed by: Michael Jenkins
- Starring: Christine Tremarco; Kevin Jones
- Theme music composer: Peter Best
- Countries of origin: Australia; United Kingdom
- Original language: English
- No. of episodes: 2

Production
- Producer: Steve Knapman
- Editor: Mike Honey
- Running time: 205 mins
- Budget: A$5.5 million

Original release
- Network: ABC TV
- Release: 8 July – 9 July 1992
- Network: BBC1
- Release: 15 July – 16 July 1993

The Leaving of Liverpool is a 1992 television drama, an Australian-British co-production between the Australian Broadcasting Corporation (ABC) and British Broadcasting Corporation (BBC). The series was about the Home Children, the migration scheme which saw over 100,000 British children sent to Commonwealth realms such as Australia, New Zealand, Canada and South Africa.

== Plot ==
The series follows two children—Lily (played by Christine Tremarco) and Bert (Kevin Jones)—who meet at the Star of the Sea Orphanage in Liverpool, England in the early 1950s. They go to Australia as child migrants where they are separated and are ill-treated. Lily is eventually reunited with her mother and returns to Britain with her but Bert is sent to a young offenders institution.

== Cast ==
- Christine Tremarco as Lily
- Kevin Jones as Bert
- Frances Barber as Ellen
- John Hargreaves as Harry
- Bill Hunter as Father O'Neill
- Frank Whitten as Brother Jerome
- Darren Yap as Dave
- John O’Hare as Singlet
- Tom Long as Ned
- Russell Kiefel as Brogan
- Sally McKenzie as Official Woman
- Josh Quong Tart as Thug
- Bob Baines as Senior Brother
- Kerry Walker as Mrs Dunne

== Production ==
The screenplay was written by writing partners John Alsop and Sue Smith who were working together on the miniseries Brides of Christ. Alsop read a review of a book about the child migration scheme, Lost Children of the Empire. Although the scheme had continued until 1967 and had affected thousands of children, little was known about it. Alsop approached Penny Chapman, head of drama at the ABC, with the idea for the story and she approved the funding. Michael Wearing, head of drama serials at the BBC, also agreed to fund and produce the drama.

== Broadcast ==
The Leaving of Liverpool first went to air over two nights, 8 and 9 July 1992, in Australia on ABC TV.

The series was not shown in the UK until over a year later, when it was shown on BBC1 on 15 and 16 July 1993. The Child Migrants Trust, a charity representing child migrants, criticised the BBC for refusing to display a helpline number for the Trust, as the ABC had. The BBC responded that the series was a drama, not a documentary, and the corporation did not publicise helplines after drama programmes.

== Awards ==
In the Logie Awards of 1993, The Leaving of Liverpool was nominated for Most Popular Telemovie or Mini Series, and won the award for Most Outstanding Telemovie or Mini Series.
