= The Aryan Couple =

- Region 2 DVD cover
- Directed by: John Daly
- Written by: John Daly; Kendrew Lascelles; Lance Miccio
- Produced by: John Daly; Peter Beale; Arcadiy Golubovich; Ilya Golubovich; Irina Szufarska
- Starring: Martin Landau; Caroline Carver; Kenny Doughty; Judy Parfitt
- Cinematography: Sergey Kozlov
- Music by: Tiffany Tram
- Distributed by: Atlantic Film Productions
- Release date: December 10, 2004
- Running time: 120 minutes
- Countries: United Kingdom; United States
- Language: English

The Aryan Couple, released on home video in the U.S. as The Couple, is a 2004 Anglo-American drama film directed by John Daly for Atlantic Film Productions. The film's story line is set in 1944, during World War II, and is about a Jewish Hungarian industrialist who, in order to ensure his large family's safe passage out of the Third Reich, is forced to hand over his business and his enormously valuable possessions to the Nazis. The plot is loosely based on the life events of Hungarian Jewish industrialist Manfred Weiss and his Manfréd Weiss Steel and Metal Works.

== Plot ==
Joseph Krauzenberg is a wealthy Hungarian Jewish industrial tycoon whose fortune is mirrored in the great properties he owns. By 1944, his factories and banks are needed by the Nazis, as Hitler's 'Final Solution' is sweeping through Europe.

The Nazis are greedy to accumulate wealth as easily as possible, and under the terms of the Third Reich's "Europa Plan", Krauzenberg arranges with Nazi leaders to exchange his business holdings and his collection of rare art for safe passage to Switzerland for himself, his wife Rachel, and their family. As the night of transaction approaches, Krauzenberg visits his large family being held by the Gestapo, and reassures them that all will be safe.

When Krauzenberg agrees to sign over his property, it is two of the most powerful men in the Nazi regime who announce they will be coming to his house to handle the paperwork – Adolf Eichmann and Heinrich Himmler. As the Nazi leaders are ushered into Krauzenberg's home, they are surprised by Krauzenberg's two most trusted servants, married Aryan couple Hans and Ingrid Vassmann, who are breaking the law by working for Jews.

As it happens, Eichmann and Himmler's suspicions are well-founded – despite appearing to be the perfect Aryan couple, Hans and Ingrid are actually Jews working deep undercover with the underground Resistance. Young, in love and expecting their first child, they work as valet and maid for the elderly Jewish couple.

In a sub-plot, Nazi officer Edelhein, the most repulsive of the group, pursues Ingrid – despite her pregnancy – as a perfect foil for implanting his precious seed in the 'Aryan beauty' to populate the new Germany.

As they have regular contact with the Nazis, in their roles as servants, Hans and Ingrid consider taking the opportunity to kill Eichmann and Himmler for the greater good, even if it would mean certain death for the Krauzenbergs and themselves. Instead, the Vassmans place their fate in the hands of the Krauzenbergs, express their admiration for them and confessing that they are Jewish and wish to escape with them. However, little can be done, as the Krauzenbergs have already submitted the list of people traveling with them.

On his way to the plane that is to take him and his family to the safety of Switzerland, Josef Krauzenberg makes an unknown deal with German Captain Dressler. Dressler then deceives Eichmann, thus giving the Vassmans the means to escape.

The Vassmans are confronted at the last checkpoint before Switzerland by Edelhein, who has discovered Dressler's treachery and has pursued them for the so-called murder of a German soldier, and of course for being Jews. However, Himmler wants to avoid any bloodshed that could ruin his agreement regarding the Krauzenberg properties, and has sent word that the Vassmans are allowed to pass freely and safely. Angered that he has lost his chance to 'plant his seed' in Ingrid, Edelhein disregards Himmler's orders, and attempts to stop the Vassmans. Under Himmler's orders to allow the Aryan Couple through, the Major commanding the crossing kills Edelhein.

The film ends with the Vassmans reunited safely in Switzerland with the Krauzenbergs.

== Cast ==
- Martin Landau – Joseph Krauzenberg, a very wealthy Hungarian Jewish industrial tycoon
- Judy Parfitt – Rachel Krauzenberg, Joseph's wife
- Kenny Doughty – Hans Vassman, a Jew posing as an Aryan working in Krauzenberg's household
- Caroline Carver – Ingrid Vassman, posing as Aryan in Krauzenberg's household and like Hans working for the Resistance
- Danny Webb – Heinrich Himmler
- Christopher Fulford – Obersturmführer Edelhein, a Nazi officer
- Steven Mackintosh – Adolf Eichmann
- Jake Wood – Dressler

== Reception ==
On the review aggregator website Rotten Tomatoes, 12% of 25 critics' reviews are positive. Metacritic, which uses a weighted average, assigned the film a score of 29 out of 100, based on 13 critics, indicating "generally unfavorable" reviews.

== Awards ==
Kenny Doughty won Best Actor at the Palm Beach International Film Festival in 2005 for his performance as Hans Vassman. The film also won Best Feature Film at the festival.
