= If I Were You (2012 Canadian film) =

- Film poster
- Directed by: Joan Carr-Wiggin
- Written by: Joan Carr-Wiggin
- Story by: Joan Carr-Wiggin
- Produced by: David Gordian; Alan Latham
- Starring: Marcia Gay Harden; Leonor Watling; Aidan Quinn
- Cinematography: Bruce Worrall
- Music by: Paolo Buonvino; Guy Farley
- Production companies: Paragraph Pictures; TallTree Pictures
- Distributed by: Koch Lorber
- Release date: January 10, 2012 (Palm Springs)
- Running time: 115 minutes
- Countries: Canada; United Kingdom
- Language: English

If I Were You is a 2012 Canadian-British comedy-drama from Joan Carr-Wiggin starring Marcia Gay Harden, Leonor Watling and Aidan Quinn.

== Plot ==
Madelyn, a marketing professional, sees her husband (Paul) canoodling with his mistress (Lucy) in a restaurant and in her credulity decides to call him just to make sure it is him she has seen.

Madelyn's distraught call grips Paul in his guilt and, consequently, he decides to leave Lucy on the spot.

Madelyn follows Lucy and finds her upset and buying a long piece of rope. Suspecting Lucy is about to commit suicide, Madelyn stalks Lucy and finds she is getting ready to hang herself with the rope in her apartment.

To save Lucy, Madelyn befriends her and aiming to help Lucy regain her confidence and develop a career in acting, she helps her get into a production of King Lear. Madelyn plays Lear (as a Queen) while Lucy is the fool.

The script and scenes of the main story are theatrically articulated as the movie pays homage to the theater and the play that has been embedded in it.

== Cast ==
- Marcia Gay Harden as Madelyn
- Leonor Watling as Lucy
- Aidan Quinn as Derek
- Valerie Mahaffey as Lydia
- Michael Therriault as Rainer (Director)
- Gary Piquer as Keith
- Elizabeth Whitmere as Goneril
- Claire Brosseau as Regan
- Joseph Kell as Paul
- Daniela Saioni as Waitress
- Genadijs Dolganovs as Store Clerk
- Bethany Jillard as Cordelia

== Reception ==
The film has a 13% approval rating on Rotten Tomatoes, based on 15 reviews with an average score of 3.86/10.

Bruce Demara of The Toronto Star awarded the film one and a half stars out of four. Andrew Schenker of Time Out awarded the film two stars out of five. Nick Schager of Slant Magazine awarded the film two stars out of four. David Noh of Film Journal International review wrote, "An anti-rom-com in the best sense, Joan Carr-Wiggin's film joyously revives the screwball tradition with real wit, as well as making one fabulously tart female buddy movie."
