= Claire Brosseau =

Canadian actress and comedian (born 1977)

Claire Brosseau (born February 24, 1977) is Canadian actress, writer and stand-up comedian. She has appeared in Just For Laughs and the Winnipeg Comedy Festival. She had parts in the films A Previous Engagement and Who is KK Downey? and a recurring role in the television series The Business. In 2025, she found herself at the centre of an ongoing national debate in Canada regarding assisted dying for applicants suffering from mental illness.

== Early life and education ==
Brosseau was born on February 24, 1977 in Montreal. Her mother is Mary Louise Kinahan. Claire grew up in Toronto and Montreal. She trained at the Neighborhood Playhouse School of the Theatre.

== Career ==
Claire Broseeau was a contributor on CBC's Day 6. She performed stand-up comedy at The Great Canadian Laugh-Off, Just For Laughs, LA, Bridgetown, Seattle, Sudbury, Winnipeg, and Ventura comedy festivals, Comedy Central and The Comedy Channel. After graduating from The Neighborhood Playhouse School of the Theatre in New York City in 1999, Brosseau worked as a singer at Don't Tell Mama in Times Square. She appears in A Previous Engagement (2005), If I Were You (2012), starring Marcia Gay Harden, and Girl's Best Friend (2008) starring Janeane Garofalo.

In May 2010, Brosseau embarked on a year long break from dating. Her blog, The Manbbatical, was published on Toronto's NOW! magazine website.

She was a guest speaker for resident doctors regarding trauma in the ER, health law, homelessness, crisis centres for women, and adoption seminars. Reporters and hosts regularly interview Claire about mental illness across all media platforms. When she could no longer perform because of memory loss, she sold her life story. Writer Tim McAuliffe based the television show Satisfaction on their friendship when they were roommates. In 2026, The Hill Times published her letter to Prime Minister Mark Carney.

Brosseau is also the author of A Clichéd Work Of Staggering Mediocrity on Substack.

== Health and assisted dying advocacy ==
Brosseau was diagnosed with bipolar disorder at fourteen. She's public about living with substance use disorder, ADHD, PTSD and disordered eating.

In 2021, Brosseau applied for Canada's medical aid in dying (MAID) program, but was subsequently rejected on the grounds that she was physically healthy. In 2022, Brosseau wrote to the Senate of Canada advocating for legislative changes to protect the equal and constitutional rights of people who live with severe and persistent mental illness. In 2023, legislative change to allow patients with mental illness to access medical assisted dying was due to come into force but implementation was pushed out.

In 2024, Brosseau, journalist John Scully, and the organisation Dying With Dignity Canada filed a constitutional challenge against the Canadian government seeking equal access to medical assisted dying for people whose sole underlying medical condition is a mental disorder. Claire and Dying With Dignity Canada are arguing that the exclusion of people with mental illness from access to assisted death is discriminatory. In May 2026, she filed an emergency injunction with the Ontario Superior Court of Justice, seeking an exemption from the exclusion of people with mental illness as their sole underlying condition from accessing MAID.

== Filmography ==
=== Film ===
Year	Title	Role	Notes
2002	Confessions of a Dangerous Mind	Office Worker	Uncredited
2004	Phil the Alien	Michelle	
2004	Geraldine's Fortune	Make-Up Girl	
2006	My First Wedding	Susie	
2008	A Previous Engagement	Jenny Reynolds	
2008	Who Is KK Downey?	Scary Mary	
2010	Peepers	The Cop Caller	
2012	If I Were You	Regan	
2016	Happily Ever After	Megan	

=== Television ===
Year	Title	Role	Notes
2004	Urban Myth Chillers	Stephanie	Episode: "À malin, malin et demi"
2006	Bethune	Evelyn	3 episodes
2006–2007	The Business	Drunk Chick / Rhonda Goldenblatt	5 episodes
2007	Framed for Murder	Charlie	Television film
2008	Girl's Best Friend	Erica	Television film
2008	A Woman's Rage	Jordan	Television film
2013	Satisfaction	Lady of the House	Episode: "The Internship, Relationship, Friendship"
2016	11.22.63	Charlene	Episode: "Happy Birthday, Lee Harvey Oswald"
