= A Previous Engagement =

- Directed by: Joan Carr-Wiggin
- Written by: Joan Carr-Wiggin
- Produced by: David Gordian
- Starring: Juliet Stevenson; Tchéky Karyo; Daniel Stern; Valerie Mahaffey
- Cinematography: Bruce Worrall
- Edited by: Pamela Benwick; Richard Benwick; Joan Carr-Wiggin
- Release date: 2006
- Running time: 118 minutes
- Countries: United States; Malta
- Language: English

A Previous Engagement is a 2006 Maltese American romantic comedy film written and directed by Joan Carr-Wiggin and starring Juliet Stevenson, Tchéky Karyo, Daniel Stern and Valerie Mahaffey.

== Cast ==
- Juliet Stevenson as Julia
- Tchéky Karyo as Alex
- Daniel Stern as Jack
- Valerie Mahaffey as Grace
- Kate Miles as Samantha
- Claire Brosseau as Jenny Reynolds

== Production ==
The film was shot entirely in Malta.

== Reception ==
The film has a 37% rating on Rotten Tomatoes based on 19 reviews. Bill Weber of Slant Magazine awarded the film half a star out of four.

John Anderson of Variety gave the film a positive review and wrote, “Despite the occasional detour into mawkishness, A Previous Engagement nicely balances unutterable truths about marriage and love with the comedy that is human interaction and the unending drama that is man and women, repulsion and attraction.”
