= My First Wedding (2006 film) =

- U.S. theatrical poster
- Directed by: Laurent Firode
- Written by: Joan Carr-Wiggin
- Produced by: David Gordian; Joan Carr-Wiggin; Robert Sidaway
- Starring: Rachael Leigh Cook; Kenny Doughty; Paul Hopkins; Caroline Carver; Valerie Mahaffey
- Cinematography: Vernon Layton
- Edited by: Richard Benwick; Pamela Benwick
- Music by: Michel Cusson
- Distributed by: Cinema Libre Studio
- Release date: 18 August 2006 (United States)
- Running time: 94 minutes
- Countries: United Kingdom; Canada
- Language: English
- Box office: $666,154

My First Wedding is a 2006 romantic comedy film directed by Laurent Firode. It stars Rachael Leigh Cook, Kenny Doughty, Paul Hopkins, Caroline Carver, and Valerie Mahaffey. It is a co-production between Canada and the United Kingdom. My First Wedding was filmed in Montreal in 2003, but did not get a release until 2006. It had a limited theatrical release in the United States on 18 August 2006.

== Plot ==
Vanessa Sinclair is about to marry her devoutly Catholic fiancée, Andre, who wants to save sex for their wedding night. As her wedding date draws nearer, Vanessa finds herself tempted by lustful thoughts and fantasizes about every man she meets. She goes to a confessional at Montreal's St. Andrew's Cathedral and confides to a priest about her dilemma. However, the man she speaks to, Nick Francis, is not actually a priest, but a carpenter who happened to be doing renovations when she dropped in. Nick, smitten with Vanessa, decides to keep up his ruse as a priest. "Father Nick" ingratiates himself into the lives of Vanessa's family and friends, who come to believe he is a real priest. While Nick becomes chummy with Andre, he seeks ways to sabotage the wedding, recruiting his sister Sandy to help him break up the impending nuptials.

== Cast ==
- Rachael Leigh Cook as Vanessa Sinclair
- Kenny Doughty as Nick Francis
- Paul Hopkins as Andre Reed
- Caroline Carver as Sandy
- Valerie Mahaffey as Grace
- Walter Massey as Father James
- Paul Soles as Harry
- Elizabeth Whitmere as Janice
- Claire Brosseau as Susie
- Kwasi Songui as Church Workman
- Glenda Braganza as Hotel Bride

== Critical reception ==
The film received negative reviews for its logical implausibilities and reliance on romcom tropes. TV Guide wrote, "The complications that ensue as Nick falls in love with Vanessa and, as Father Nick, tries to sabotage her wedding, are indeed complicated and the film could be Exhibit A in any argument contending that romantic comedies encourage behavior that would get spurned swains arrested as stalkers in real life. If it were at all funny, that might be forgiven."

Nick Schager of Slant Magazine opined the film "only manages to progress from plot point A to B thanks to the witlessness of its unbelievably naïve protagonists". He concluded "it's the demand for an ungodly suspension of disbelief that ultimately undoes My First Wedding, from its contrived scenes of pre-ceremony charades and phony demonic possession—complete with Andre telling a Satanically babbling Nick, 'I don't speak Spanish'—to its idea that Nick could get any play after being seen wearing a 'Let’s Get Jiggy' T-shirt".

Frank Lovece of Film Journal called the film "The Thorn Birds for the Maxim generation" and noted, "We're supposed to be charmed by Nick's efforts to pursue the woman of his dreams despite all obstacles, but his plan involves such slimy abuse of Vanessa's trust and faith-and continues for so long after her marriage ceremony (which he performed, making it unofficial)-that it becomes creepily obsessive."

Elizabeth Weitzman of the New York Daily News wrote, "For reasons that remain between him and the confession booth, Firode considers Nick's shameless duplicity the height of romance, while Vanessa's bizarre nymphomania is presented as perfectly charming."
