= Sleeping with Strangers =

1994 film by William T. Bolson

- Directed by: William T. Bolson
- Written by: Joan Carr-Wiggin
- Produced by: Joan Carr-Wiggin
- Starring: Adrienne Shelly; Alastair Duncan; Kim Huffman; Shawn Thompson; Scott McNeil
- Edited by: Richard Benwick
- Release date: 1994
- Language: English
- Budget: $2,500,000

Sleeping with Strangers is a 1994 romantic comedy directed by William T. Bolson and written by Joan Carr-Wiggin. The film stars Adrienne Shelly, Alastair Duncan (credited as Neil Duncan), Kim Huffman, Shawn Thompson, and Scott McNeil.

== Plot ==
A popular actress (Shelly) and a rock star (McNeil) come to a small Canadian town with two competing hotels next door to each other. The rock star is escorted into one of the hotels and the actress checks into the other. Daniel (Duncan), the owner of one of the two hotels, is trying to stay afloat. The other hotel owner, Mark (Thompson), is trying to steal away Daniel's business and his fiancée (Huffman). The paparazzi arrives in town and makes everybody wonder, who is sleeping with whom?

== Cast extras ==
- Adrienne Shelly as Jenny Dole
- Alastair Duncan as Daniel (credited as Neil Duncan)
- Kim Huffman as Teri
- Shawn Thompson as Mark
- Scott McNeil as Todd Warren
- Gary Jones as Loan Officer
- Anthony Ulc as Sam
- Claire Caplan as Elsie
- Betty Linde as Margaret
- Tamsin Jones as Loan Officer's Daughter

== Production ==
Sleeping with Strangers was filmed around Victoria, British Columbia, Canada with a budget of $2.5 million.
