= Who Is KK Downey? =

- Directed by: Pat Kiely; Darren Curtis
- Written by: Pat Kiely; Darren Curtis; Matt Silver
- Produced by: Brandi-Ann Milbradt; Trevor Barnes; Kieran Crilly
- Starring: Pat Kiely; Darren Curtis
- Cinematography: Bobby Shore
- Music by: Tod van Dyk
- Distributed by: IndiePix Films (US)
- Release date: September 5, 2008
- Running time: 90 minutes
- Country: Canada
- Language: English

Who Is KK Downey? is a 2008 comedy film directed by Pat Kiely and Darren Curtis. It was produced in Montreal, Quebec, Canada.

Loosely based on the JT Leroy controversy, the film stars Darren Curtis and Matt Silver as Terrance Permenstein and Theo Huxtable, two friends who invent the character of KK Downey, a transgender street prostitute, as the "author" of Theo's novel Truck Stop Hustler after it gets rejected by a publisher because Theo comes across too white and middle-class to be believable as the writer of a book about street life, with Terrance donning drag to play Downey. Kiely also stars as Connor Rooney, a music journalist who becomes suspicious of Downey's story and tries to hunt down the truth.

The film was created through the Montreal comedy troupe Kidnapper Films. Paul Spence, Brent Skagford and Dan Beirne also appear in supporting roles.

== Cast ==
Actor	Role
Scott Thompson	
Darren Curtis	Terrance/KK
Kristin Adams	Sue
Matt Silver	Theo Huxtable
Pat Kiely	Connor
Dan Haber	Frankie Lola
Claire Brosseau	Crazy Mary
Pilar Cazares	Boochis
Christine Ghawi	Penelope
Trevor Hayes	Saul
Brent Skagford	Fishlips
Etan Muskat	Ratso

== Release ==
The film premiered at the Cinequest Film Festival in San Jose. It then screened at the Philadelphia Film Festival before its limited release in Canada in September, 2008. It also screened at the Oldenburg International Film Festival, the Boston Underground Film Festival, the Toronto After Dark Film Festival, the Tallgrass Film Festival, CMJ Film Festival, the Kingston Canadian Film Festival, the Chicago International Music and Movie Festival, and the Wisconsin Film Festival.

The film was released on DVD in Canada on April 14, 2009 by Koch International, and on DVD in the United States by Indiepix in October 2009.

== Reception ==
Philip Brown of Exclaim! called the film "easily the funniest Canadian film to hit screens in decades", writing that "I've got a feeling that a few years from now we may all look back at Who Is KK Downey? as the beginning of some pretty big comedy careers.

Liam Lacey of The Globe and Mail gave the film three stars and referred to it as "rude and blessedly tasteless, without any sense the creators have any agenda except to be funny."

John Griffin of the Montreal Gazette wrote that "Who is KK Downey? concedes little to conventional film notions of beauty, taste or narrative arc, preferring to rely on the brains, wit and energy of its cast and writers, and the formidable ensemble power of local musicians, crew, producers and locations. This is a DIY basement enterprise, with the good humour, hardcore ethos and sheer hustle to pull it all together. You're either with Who is KK Downey? or you're not. I'm there. You could be, too."

Marie-Geneviève Cyr received a Genie Award nomination for Best Costume Design at the 29th Genie Awards in 2009. At the 11th Jutra Awards, Tod Vandyk, Peter Lopata and Jean-Philippe Espantoso were nominated for Best Sound.
