= The Business (TV series) =

- Created by: Phil Price
- Starring: Kathleen Robertson; Rob deLeeuw; Nicolas Wright; Trevor Hayes; James A. Woods
- Countries of origin: Canada; United States
- No. of seasons: 2
- No. of episodes: 16

Production
- Running time: Approx. 22 minutes

Original release
- Network: The Movie Network & IFC
- Release: August 4, 2006 – September 23, 2007

The Business is a sitcom which aired on The Movie Network in Canada and IFC in the United States.

The show centres on Vic Morgan (Rob Deleeuw), an adult film director of a low-budget softcore pornographic series similar to Girls Gone Wild. He attempts to become a legitimate film maker after having converted to Judaism to be successful in the entertainment industry. Season one depicts the production of his first independent film and the difficulties along the way with an undisciplined production staff, poorly skilled actors, and an eccentric Japanese investor. Season two follows the company following the success of its first film as they search for a follow-up project.

The series is filmed and produced in Montreal by Philms Pictures, and has a predominantly Canadian cast.

== Characters ==
=== Main ===
Name	Actor	Role
Julia Sullivan	Kathleen Robertson	Producer
Vic Morgenstein	Rob deLeeuw	Founder of Vic's Flicks
Rufus Marquez	Nicolas Wright	Director
Tony Russ	Trevor Hayes	PR/Marketing for Vic's Flicks
Lance Rawley	James A. Woods	Star of Vic's Flicks "House of Fear"

=== Recurring ===
- Kaela Bahrey as Vic's daughter Beatrice Morgenstein.
- Matt Silver as Terrence von Holtzen, the freshly promoted Associate Co-head of the Animation and Historical Adaptation Department.
- Nobuya Shimamoto as Vic's former brother-in-law and film investor, Kenji Nakamura.
- Ellen David as Vic's Flicks brutally honest secretary, Shelley Baker.
- Glenda Braganza as new employee Nancy Drake.
- Neil Napier as greasy accountant Wendell Cooper.
- Sophie Grégoire as Brooke Fairchild.
- Claire Brosseau as eccentric interior decorator Rhonda Goldenblatt.
- Karen Cliche as Scarlet Saint-James, star of Vic's legitimate indie-thriller.

== Episodes ==
=== Series overview ===
Season	Episodes	Originally released	
Season	Episodes	First released	Last released
1	8	August 4, 2006	September 22, 2006
2	8	August 5, 2007	September 23, 2007

=== Season 1 (2006) ===
No.	Title	Directed by	Written by	Original release date	Prod. code
1	"The Business (Pilot)"	Phil Price	Phil Price	August 4, 2006	101
High off the success of the low-budget film he picked up at MUFF, Vic attempts to produce an indie-thriller and shed his reputation as a soft-core smut peddler. Will converting to Judaism, adding a “-stein” to his last name and enlisting the help of an experienced producer be enough to gain Vic Morgenstein the respect he craves from his peers?
2	"Vic’s Flicks"	Phil Price	Phil Price	August 11, 2006	102
Losing your cool at the birthday party for your investor’s kid may be the easiest way to lose money on a film; just ask Vic. Desperate to raise a million dollars, Vic discovers his only option for a new investor may be a bottle of sake away.
3	"Strings"	Phil Price	Phil Price	August 18, 2006	103
Things continue to spiral out of control at Vic’s Flicks as demands made by the new outlandish investor Kenji Nakamura (Nobuya Shimamoto) forces Vic, Julia and Rufus to make concessions including, upping the blood, guts, product placements and nudity; all the element of a Hollywood blockbuster.
4	"A Star is Porn"	Phil Price	Phil Price	August 25, 2006	104
The crew is sure the movie is doomed when a famous porn star, Scarlet Saint-James (Karen Cliché), is cast as the lead actress of their legitimate indie-thriller. They soon learn all porn stars are not created equal.
5	"Check Please"	Phil Price	Phil Price	September 1, 2006	105
When a check from Kenji comes unsigned and for less than the full amount, production comes to a halt and Vic goes on a wild quest to get his money. On the set, Rufus’ attraction to Scarlet has Lance (James A. Woods) feeling like he’s “B-list” for the first time.
6	"T-Day"	Phil Price	Phil Price	September 8, 2006	106
They’ve all seen her act but will they see her topless? The clock is ticking and the cameras are in place to capture Scarlet, once porn star, now lead actress, in all her glory.
7	"The Closer"	Phil Price	Phil Price	September 15, 2006	107
Now with Rufus gone and the lead actor in a mental institution, completing the film seems impossible. But will the hiring of a new and eccentric director turn the production around?
8	"Thats a Wrap"	Phil Price	Phil Price	September 22, 2006	108
The Closer (Clive Walton) has things under control until Scarlet refuses to do the love scene under the direction of anyone but Rufus.

=== Season 2 (2007) ===
Premiered Sun, August 5, 2007 @ 11:00pm ET/PT on IFC

No.	Title	Directed by	Written by	Original release date	Prod. code
1	"Back in the Business"	Unknown	Unknown	August 5, 2007	201
Making the most of the box office success generated by their indie-thriller House of Fear, the team at Vic's Flicks moves up the ladder and into new offices. Interior design face-offs aside, Julia's main goal is to apply her carefully crafted 5-year business plan and find a follow-up hit. But will the rest of them comply? One thing is for certain: the gang is back in The Business.
2	"Vic's Bringing Sexy Back"	Unknown	Unknown	August 16, 2007	202
From the moment French director Kiki de Charentais (Simone-Elise Girard) makes her first appearance, she exudes a lingering sexual energy, powerful enough to corrupt the purest of souls. Indeed, something has come over the team at Vic's Flicks: buttons are undone, hair is flipped, body parts are exposed, soldiers are erect, fantasy flirts with reality and the magnetism in the air is practically palpable. Will the imprint left by Kiki's alluring presence be permanent?
3	"Lance-A-Lot"	Unknown	Unknown	August 19, 2007	203
After a masterful story-telling Irishman makes his brilliant film pitch about an IRA bomber on a politically motivated hunger strike, the team at Vic's Flicks lets the weight of it all set the tone for the remainder of the day. Convinced that this script idea is Oscar-worthy, Julia, against her better judgment, calls Lance Rawley into the office to offer him the title role. But Lance rolls in having undergone sizeable changes, leaving the others flabbergasted and speechless.
4	"Twofus"	Unknown	Unknown	August 26, 2007	204
People's pasts are back to haunt them. A handsome prowling stranger turns out to be Julia's ex-husband and threatens Vic's Flicks publicist Tony's confidence with his good looks, his charm and his firm grip. Vic must attempt to dodge a legal bullet when his past as a cheap smut-peddler revisits him. And Derek Tibble, a seemingly innocent friend from House of Fear director Rufus' past, threatens Rufus' credibility and the legitimacy of his work.
5	"Full Moon and Half Nuts"	Unknown	Unknown	September 2, 2007	205
Fear overcomes Vic when he realizes a deep-seated family secret is back to haunt him and forces (or paranoia?) are out to get him. No one is to be trusted: the elevator repairman is making clear attempts on his life; Terrence is conspiring against him with his not-so-trustworthy business partner; intern-turned-spy Nancy Drake serves Tony in his quest to find out the real reason behind Julia and Terrence's secretive behaviour. All because of a suspicious roll of film that proves one of the greatest cover-ups in modern history.
6	"The Family Jules"	Unknown	Unknown	September 9, 2007	206
Discouraged that she has neither found an idea for their next big hit nor acquired an Independent Spirit Award nomination for House of Fear, Julia chooses to change her focus. Blinded by her discontent, she fails to notice that the golden script she's been hoping for is right under her nose, in her intern Nancy's hands. As Nancy's frustration grows when everyone dismisses her attempts at being heard, she resorts to malicious measures to punish Vic's Flicks for not paying better attention to her real potential. In the end, it's all about karma.
7	"Field Trip to Hollywood: Part 1"	Unknown	Unknown	September 16, 2007	207
The Independent Spirit Awards are calling! Julia, Vic, Tony, Rufus and Lance barely make it past airport security and eagerly set foot in La-La-Land, where showbiz is a way of life. Enthralled by the idea of pursuing endless opportunities, they all go out to chase their dreams. But their high hopes are quickly hampered by a slew of characters that only Hollywood could provide. Will the team manage to keep their integrity intact or will they let themselves be corrupted by the West Coast air?
8	"Field Trip to Hollywood: Part 2"	Unknown	Unknown	September 23, 2007	208
Dressed to the nines, the gang makes their way to the red carpet, some as concerned about their speech as Rufus is about his bowel movements. While Lance and Tony feel completely at home schmoozing, Julia is like a deer in headlights. Nevertheless, they all make it inside to await the outcome of the long-anticipated awards ceremony. Despite Lance's tasteless ways, Vic's foot lodged permanently in his mouth, Julia's nervous blathering, and Rufus' unfortunate intolerance to spicy foods, the Vic's Flicks team proves that in the end all they need is heart — and each other.

== Notes ==
This series airs on IFC in a paired timeslot where The Minor Accomplishments of Jackie Woodman, starring Laura Kightlinger airs in the last half-hour of the hour-long timeslot.
