= Kenny Doughty =

English actor (born 1975)

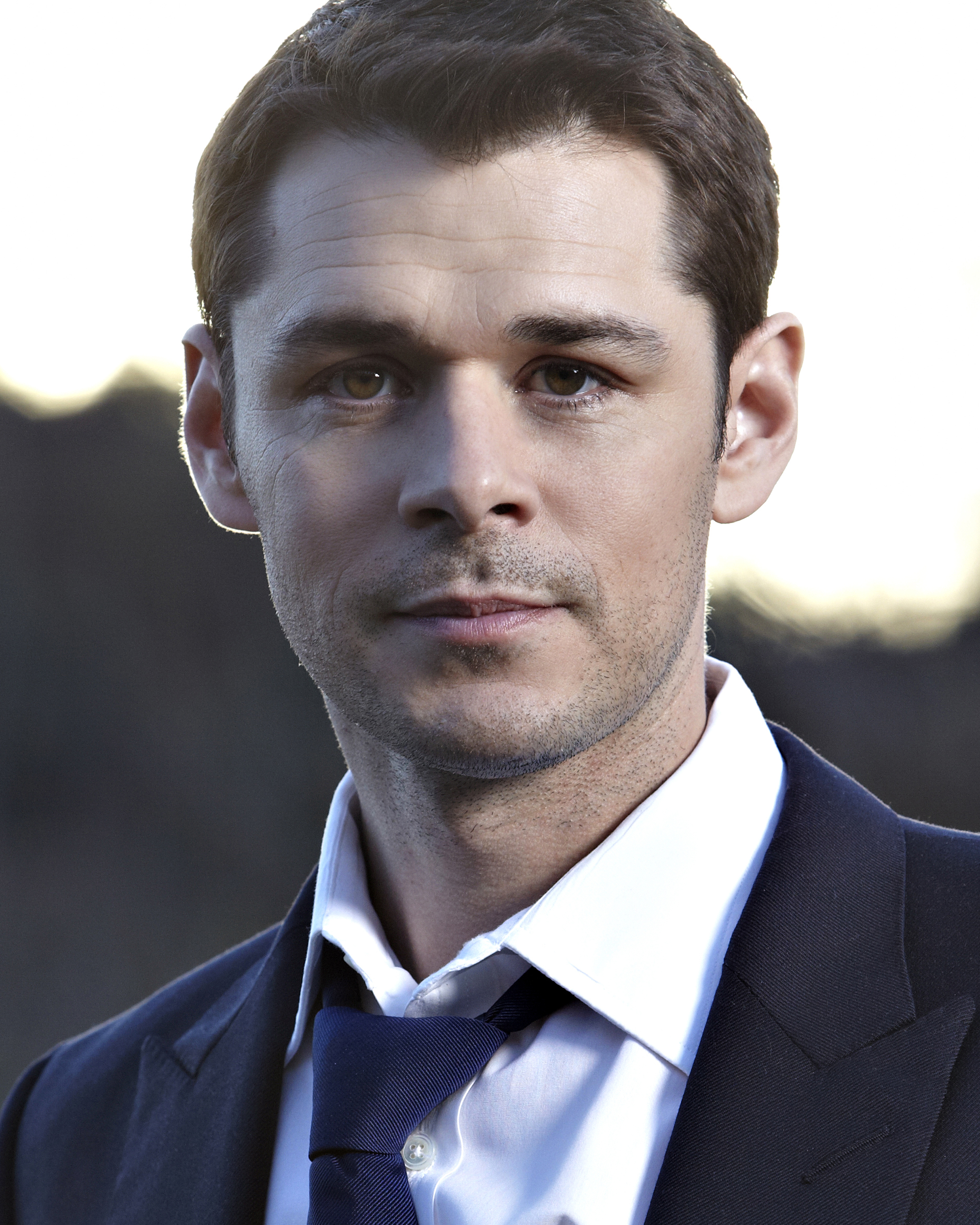
- Doughty in 2012
- Born: 27 March 1975 (age 51); Barnsley, South Yorkshire, England
- Education: Guildhall School of Music and Drama
- Occupations: Actor, director
- Years active: 1998–present
- Known for: Coronation Street; Stella; Vera
- Spouses: Caroline Carver (m. 2006; div. 2017); Ashley Jensen (m. 2023)

Kenny Doughty (born 27 March 1975) is an English actor and director, known for playing DS Aiden Healy on ITV's Crime Drama Vera and as Sean in Stella.

== Early life ==
Doughty was born in Barnsley, South Yorkshire. He attended Charter School, which became the Kingstone School on Broadway Barnsley, where he performed a leading role in Grease. He trained at the Guildhall School of Music and Drama.

== Career ==
Doughty's career began with minor appearances in films and television series, including I Want You (1998), Dinnerladies (1998), and he appeared in the 1998 film Elizabeth as Sir Thomas Elyot.

In 2009, Doughty appeared in 9 episodes of Coronation Street as Jake Harman.

From 2012 to 2013, Doughty appeared as Sean McGaskill in the Ruth Jones-penned comedy drama series Stella.

From 2015 to 2023, Doughty starred as DS Aiden Healy alongside Brenda Blethyn in ITV's Vera.

Doughty completed a UK tour of Simon Beaufoy's stage play The Full Monty in 2013. The play, in which Doughty played Gaz, was nominated for a Laurence Olivier Award for Best New Comedy in 2014.

In March 2023, Doughty revealed he had stepped down from working on Vera, writing online, " I can confirm I am leaving Vera. I want to thank everyone who’s made this amazing time so joyous, ITV, Silverprint, all the brilliant cast and crew BUT of course my buddy & inspiration Brenda Blethyn. The perfect leading star who I owe so much to. I feel lucky to have you as a friend, you make me howl with laughter & have been a rock for me over the years. I can’t thank you enough. Precious times."

== Personal life ==
From 2006 to 2017, Doughty was married to actress Caroline Carver.

In 2023, Doughty married actress Ashley Jensen.

== Filmography ==
=== As actor ===
| Year | Title | Character | Notes |
|---|---|---|---|
| 1998 | I Want You | Smokey's Friend | |
| 1998 | Heartbeat | Barry Hadfield | Series 8 episode 9: Pat-A-Cake |
| 1998 | Anorak of Fire | Gus Gascoigne | |
| 1998 | Dinnerladies | Clint | 1 episode: Scandal |
| 1999 | Titus | Quintus | |
| 1999 | A Christmas Carol | Young Ebenezer Scrooge | |
| 1999 | Love in the 21st Century | Billy | Series 1 episode 1: Reproduction |
| 1999 | Elizabeth | Sir Thomas Elyot | |
| 2000 | Lover's Prayer | Denis | |
| 2000 | City Central | Grant Allen | Series 3 episode 2: Half Man Half Cup |
| 2001 | Crush | Jed Willis | |
| 2002 | Wire in the Blood | Jason | 2 episodes |
| 2002 | Sunday | Para 027 | |
| 2003 | Gifted | Jamie Gilliam | |
| 2003 | The Canterbury Tales | Danny Abolson | Series 1 episode 1: The Miller's Tale |
| 2003 | Servants | William Forrest | 6 episodes |
| 2003 | The Second Coming | PC Simon Lincoln | 2 episodes |
| 2004 | The Aryan Couple | Hans Vassman | |
| 2004 | Primevil | Nick | |
| 2005 | Funland | Liam Woolf | |
| 2005 | The Great Raid | Pitt | |
| 2006 | My First Wedding | Nick | |
| 2006 | Goldplated | Col | |
| 2006 | Kenneth Williams: Fantabulosa! | Joe Orton | |
| 2007 | Fairy Tales | Jake | |
| 2008 | Shameless | Mark | 1 episode; series 5 episode 10 |
| 2008 | Outlaws or The Crew | Ratter | |
| 2009 | Paradox | Gerry Mortimer | 1 episode |
| 2009 | New Tricks | Billy | 1 episode |
| 2009 | Coronation Street | Jake Harman | 9 episodes |
| 2010 | Irreversi | David | |
| 2010 | City Rats | Olly | |
| 2011 | Asylum Blackout | Max | |
| 2011 | i Against i | Drake | |
| 2012–2013 | Stella | Sean | 15 episodes |
| 2013 | Peterman | Jim | |
| 2013 | Snowpiercer | Adam | |
| 2015 | Black Work | DS Ryan Gillespie | 1 episode |
| 2015–2023 | Vera | DS Aiden Healy | 34 episodes |
| 2017 | Love, Lies and Records | Rick | 6 episodes |
| 2025 | The Au Pair | Chris Dalton | 4 episodes |
| 2025 | Midsomer Murders | Tim Crawford | Episode: "Top of the Class" |

=== As director ===
| Year | Title | Notes |
|---|---|---|
| 2008 | You Me and Captain Longbridge | Short film |
| 2013 | Vengeance Waits | |
