= Caroline Carver (actress) =

English actress, screenwriter, and producer

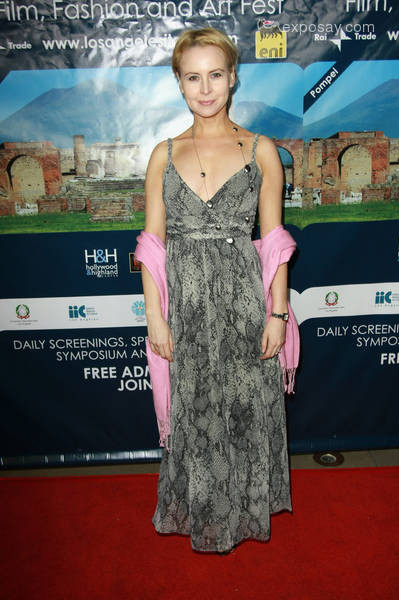
- Born: 1976 (age 49–50); Manchester, England
- Occupations: Actress, screenwriter, producer
- Years active: 1998–present
- Spouse: Kenny Doughty (m. 2006; div. 2017)

Caroline Carver (born 1976) is an English actress, screenwriter, and producer best known for roles such as Princess Jessica in the TV film The Magical Legend of the Leprechauns (1999), Ingrid in The Aryan Couple (2004), and Sandy in My First Wedding (2006).

== Career ==
Carver played the young adult Hattie in the film Tom's Midnight Garden (1999) based on the book of the same name, alongside Anthony Way and Joan Plowright. Early film work also includes The Magical Legend of the Leprechauns (1999).

Carver's television work has ranged from costume drama, such as Sharpe's Peril; modern drama, including Spooks, Jonathan Creek and Rosemary & Thyme; to medical drama in the shape of Holby City and Doctors. She won a Royal Television Society Best Actress Award for her performance in The Scarlet Pimpernel series, opposite Richard E. Grant.

On stage, in 2013 she played the role of Mandy in The Full Monty on tour. She reprised the role in the West End in 2014.

She wrote and produced the award-winning short film You Me and Captain Longbridge (2008). Carver also wrote an episode of The Bay, which aired in 2023.

== Personal life ==
From to 2006 to 2017 Carver was married to actor Kenny Doughty.

== Filmography ==
Year	Title	Role	Notes
1998	City Central	Alison	Episode: A Night on the Town
1998	A Rather English Marriage	Young Grace	
1999	The Last Train	Hild	
1999	The Magical Legend of the Leprechauns	Princess Jessica	
1999	Tom's Midnight Garden	Hatty	
2000	The Scarlet Pimpernel	Claudette de Bridoire	Episode: A Good Name
2001	Alone	Sarah	
2001	Murder Rooms: The Dark Beginnings of Sherlock Holmes	Gladys Donovan	Episode: The Kingdom of Bones
2001	Animated Tales of the World	Ines (voice)	Episode: Ewenn Congar: a Story from France
2001	The Inspector Lynley Mysteries	Danny	Episode: A Great Deliverance
2001	In a Land of Plenty	Zoe	3 episodes
2002	Jeffrey Archer: The Truth	Secretary	
2003	Holby City	Sonia Shaw	
2003	Jonathan Creek	Sally Ellen Oakley	Series 4 episode 2: Angel Hair
2004	The Aryan Couple	Ingrid Vassman	
2004	Spooks	Catherine Townsend	1 episode
2004	Rosemary & Thyme	Penny Patterson	Episode: The Gongoozlers
2004	George and the Dragon	Sister Angela	
2006	My First Wedding	Sandy	
2007	Goldfish	Clare	
2008	Sharpe's Peril	Mrs Tredinnick	2 episodes
2008	The Royal Today	Heather Dunstan	47 episodes
2009	Doctors	Elaine Lenton	Series 11 episode 56: Dummy
2009	Irreversi	Terry	
2010	New Tricks	Helen Vestry	Series 7 episode 4: Dark Chocolate
2013	Shame the Devil	Emma	
2015	Holby City	Sonia Shaw	Episode: Domino Effect
2015	Pompidou	Ambulance volunteer	Series 1 episode 5: Hoarder
