= Hector (2015 film) =

- Directed by: Jake Gavin
- Written by: Jake Gavin
- Produced by: Stephen Malit
- Starring: Peter Mullan; Keith Allen; Natalie Gavin; Sharon Rooney; Sarah Solemani; Ewan Stewart; Laurie Ventry; Stephen Tompkinson; Gina McKee
- Cinematography: David Raedeker
- Edited by: Guy Bensley
- Music by: Emily Barker
- Release date: 11 December 2015
- Country: United Kingdom
- Language: English

Hector is a 2015 British drama film written and directed by Jake Gavin. Starring Peter Mullan as the titular character, it follows the annual Christmas journey of a homeless man from Scotland to London. His background is revealed as the plot unfolds.

== Plot ==
Hector McAdam is a warm-hearted, limping, homeless man. His past experiences, which come to light during the film and explain his current situation, are both of kindness and lack of kindness of others.

In the present day, Hector and homeless friends, Dougie and Hazel, are given jackets by a stranger. Hector hitchhikes to Glasgow for a hospital appointment. After being given an appointment in a few weeks for a non-urgent operation, returning from the direction of the oncology department, he is recognised by an acquaintance, who hasn't seen him in years. The man says his brother Peter tried to find him after he disappeared. Hector doesn't want to talk. He is attacked later by youths who want to steal his bag. They are chased away by a shopkeeper who tends his wounds and repairs his bag. Hector refuses an alcoholic drink and checks to see that none of his letters, which have sentimental value, are missing.

Hector decides to try to find his siblings whom he hasn't seen for 15 years. Looking for his sister Lizzie in Newcastle, he eventually finds her husband, Derek, who berates him for visiting after so many years without communication. After phoning his sister as Hector asks, Derek tells him she will not see him, offering to take him to the station and offering him money which Hector refuses. He says he is spending Christmas with friends in a London shelter. He asks where his brother, Peter, is and whether he has his number. Derek says London, but ignores the request and tells Hector not to come back.

Hector arrives at a service station and encounters Hazel and Dougie, who tells him to sleep in the disabled toilet, as it was a cold night and he looked unwell. Hector accepts, but awakes to find Dougie dead. Hazel runs away, leaving Hector to deal with the police. After arriving in Liverpool and being given shelter in a church, the vicar gives him a voucher for a café. He receives a free breakfast but, when he spills his tea and looks for a towel to mop it up, the waitress accuses him of attempted theft.

He goes to London, but the Christmas shelter initially tells him that it is full. Sara, a volunteer, recognises him as a regular at Christmas and finds him a bed. Hector asks Sara to help him trace his brother and she gives him internet access. Hazel turns up and Hector calms her down while Sara gets her into a women's shelter. Peter tracks down Hector at the shelter, and tells him he has visited several shelters looking for him, after he called their sister to wish her Merry Christmas and Derek told him about Hector's plans. Peter asks Hector how he lives. Hector says that he was helped by a social worker to claim his benefits, whilst travelling. Peter offers to see more of Hector over Christmas, but Hector says that his fellow homeless are his family now. When he sees Sara later, he tells her he never fell out with Peter, but 'fell out with life'. He revealed he had been sectioned and left his old life behind following a stint in a halfway house.

After a day's shopping, Hector feels unwell. He tells Sara that his wife and daughter were killed on this day, Christmas Eve, by a drunk driver. The following day, Hector enjoys his Christmas dinner with friends. Peter returns and takes him to meet Lizzie and Derek nearby. Hector tells Lizzie, who had rebuked him for his lack of contact, he blamed himself for his family's deaths as they had left after a row. The shelter empties, and Sara says she hopes to see him next year. He tells her that he's going to stay with his sister for a while, and the plan is to have a family Christmas. Sara gives him new shoes, and tells him to look after himself. Hector hitch-hikes back up north for his operation.

== Cast ==
- Peter Mullan as Hector McAdam
- Keith Allen as Jimbo
- Natalie Gavin as Hazel
- Sharon Rooney as Young Mother
- Sarah Solemani as Sara
- Ewan Stewart as Peter
- Laurie Ventry as Dougie
- Stephen Tompkinson as Derek
- Gina McKee as Lizzie

== Reception ==
The film was mostly positively received by critics, having an approval rating of 94% based on 16 critic reviews with an average rating of 7.2/10 on review aggregator website Rotten Tomatoes. In The Observer, Mark Kermode praised the film as a "surprisingly warm and rewardingly aware tale of homelessness at Christmas" and rated it four out of five stars. In The Guardian, Henry Barnes compared the film critically to the work of Ken Loach and suggested the film painted an unduly positive picture of homelessness.

== See also ==
- 2015 in film
- List of British films of 2015
