= Kacy Andrews =

American film producer

- Born: February 27, 1969 (age 57); Indianapolis, Indiana, United States
- Education: Ball State University
- Occupations: CEO of Bigfoot Entertainment, film producer
- Known for: Founder: Bigfoot Entertainment and International Academy of Film and Television

Kacy Andrews (born February 27, 1969) is an American film producer and CEO of Bigfoot Entertainment.

== Education ==
Kacy graduated cum laude from Ball State University in 1991 with a degree in telecommunications and continuing studies at the American Film Institute. In 2000, she was awarded Ball States University's Graduate of the Last Decade.

== Career ==
Kacy spent nine years in production and project development at Hyperion. She moved from position of production assistant to operations manager, assistant to the co-owner, writer, director and associate producer. She has worked on various feature films, television series, theater and animation, including as associate producer on Miramax's Playing by Heart starring Sean Connery and Angelina Jolie. Her projects includes films and shows that starred such actors as Louie Anderson (Life with Louie), Linda Cardellini (Bone Chillers), and other projects like HBO's Happily Ever After: Fairy Tales for Every Child (with stars like Denzel Washington and Whoopi Goldberg) and the Oz Kids (with Jonathan Taylor Thomas).

In 2003 her consulting work at Bigfoot Productions in Asia led to the creation of the Bigfoot Entertainment and the International Academy of Film and Television with founder Michael Gleissner. The company is located in Cebu, Philippines with offices and additional schools in Hong Kong and Los Angeles. In October 2010, they purchased the facilities of Majestic Crest Theatre in Westwood, California as a venue to showcase their films. In November 2010, Kacy led the launching of Bigfoot Ascendant Distribution (formerly Ascendant Pictures) which will be the foreign and domestic sales arm of Bigfoot.

As CEO of Bigfoot Entertainment Kacy has produced films such as The Curiosity of Chance, Irreversi (Estella Warren), Midnight Movie, Within, The Girl With No Number and Deep Gold (Bebe Pham). She has also produced documentaries, 9000 Needles and USS Cooper: Return to Ormoc Bay as well as reality series' Hollywood Boot Camp.

== Filmography ==
- Life with Louie (TV series) (1995)
- Toto Lost in New York (associate producer) (1996)
- The Oz Kids (producer and writer) (1996)
- Journey Beneath the Sea (associate producer) (1997)
- Underground Adventure (associate producer) (1997)
- The Return of Mombi (associate producer) (1997)
- The Monkey Prince (associate producer) (1997)
- The Nome Prince and the Magic Belt (producer) (1996)
- Playing by Heart (associate producer) (1998)
- The Curiosity of Chance (executive producer) (2006)
- USS Cooper: Return to Ormoc Bay (executive producer) (2006)
- Hollywood Boot Camp (TV) (executive producer) (2007)
- Midnight Movie (producer) (2008)
- You Me and Captain Longbridge (executive producer) (2008)
- Within (executive producer) (2009)
- Irreversi (producer) (2010)
- The Girl with No Number (producer) (2011)
- Deep Gold (executive producer) (2011)
- 9000 Needles (executive producer) (2011)
