= Ladybeard =

Australian wrestler, stuntman, singer and online streamer

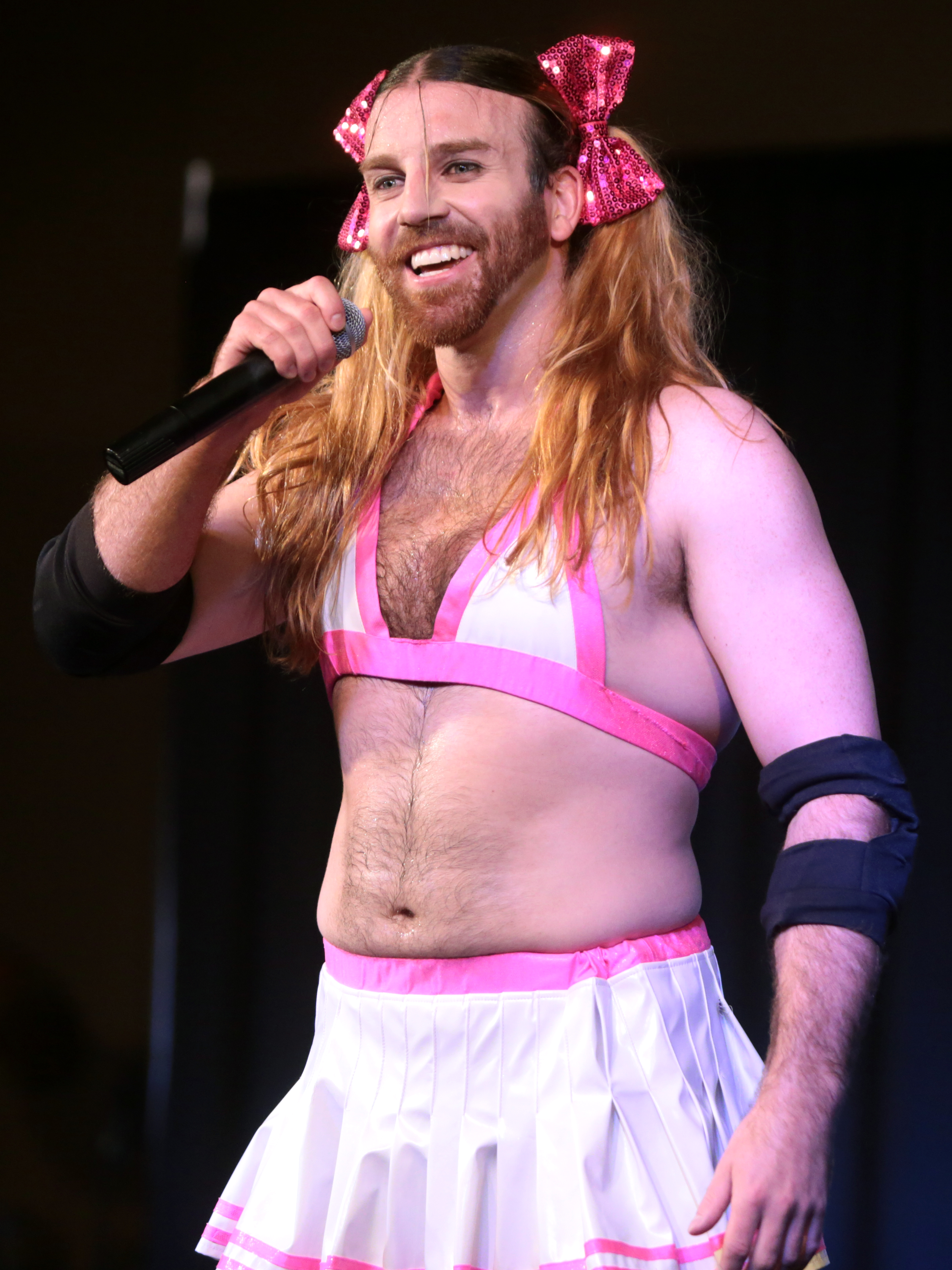
- Ladybeard in 2016
- Born: Richard Magarey; August 3, 1983 (age 43); Adelaide, South Australia, Australia
- Education: Flinders University
- Professional wrestling career
- Ring name(s): Ladybeard; Richard Burn
- Billed height: 6 ft 0 in (183 cm)
- Billed from: Adelaide, South Australia
- Debut: 2009
- Musical career
- Genre: Kawaii metal
- Instrument: Vocals
- Years active: 2015–present
- Website: http://www.ladybeard.com/

Richard Magarey is an Australian stuntman, professional wrestler, singer and online streamer, known for his bearded crossdressing persona named Ladybeard (Japanese: レディビアード). He is currently vocalist of the band Babybeard, formerly with the band Ladybaby and Deadlift Lolita.

== Early career ==
According to GirlsWalker, Magarey first started crossdressing when he was 14 years old using his sister's school uniform. Ever since then, cute outfits have been part of his eventual wrestling gimmick. Margarey worked in Supré when he was 18.

Magarey graduated from the Flinders University of South Australia Drama Centre in 2004 with a Bachelor of Creative Arts before moving to Melbourne to train in Hong Kong-style martial arts and cinematic stunt work with Paul Andreovski of the Jackie Chan Stunt Team.

== Wrestling and acting career ==
Originally from Adelaide, Magarey moved to Hong Kong in 2006 to kickstart his martial arts stunt career in films, later becoming a hit in Hong Kong as a cross-dressing pro wrestler. He held roles in two Michael Gleissner movies: Irreversi, shot in 2010 in Hong Kong (where Magarey was also the stand-in for lead actor Ian Bohen), and Deep Gold, shot in 2011 in the Philippines. He also starred as the main foreign villain in The Fortune Buddies. In October 2013 he moved to Tokyo, Japan to attempt a similar career there. On 1 January 2015, Ladybeard released the DVD+CD Ladybeard Justice Fight Ai To Yuki To Bikini To Hige To (ジャスティス・ファイト ~愛と勇気とビキニと髭と). In 2017 Ladybeard was part of the Australian documentary Big in Japan.

In addition to his native English, Ladybeard has conversational levels of Japanese, Cantonese, Mandarin Chinese and can understand some German.

== Championships and accomplishments ==
- DDT Pro-Wrestling
  - Ironman Heavymetalweight Championship (3 times)
  - KO-D 10-Man Tag Team Championship (1 time) – with Ken Ohka, LiLiCo, Makoto Oishi and Super Sasadango Machine
- Union Pro Wrestling
  - Fly To Everywhere World Championship (1 time)

== Music career ==
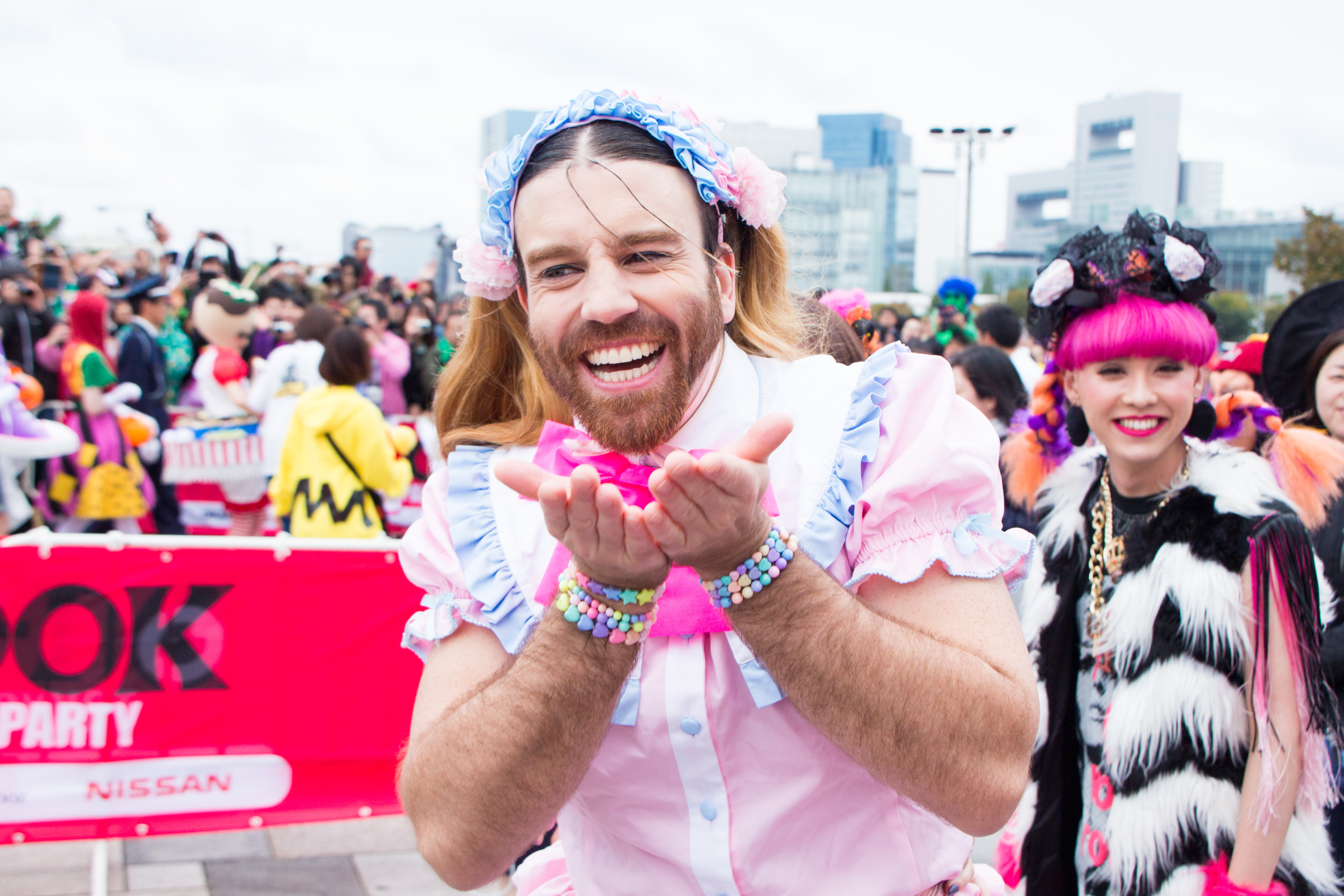
Ladybeard at T-SPOOK 2016, an event held at Odaiba.

Ladybeard's musical style is described as Kawaiicore, a portmanteau of kawaii (Japanese for "cute") and the -core suffix associated with hardcore metal genres. His motto is "Sing, dance, destroy!".

=== Ladybaby ===
In 2015, he formed the band with singers Rie Kaneko and Rei Kuromiya called Ladybaby. On 4 July, the group released their first track and music video titled 'Nippon Manju' ('Japanese Bun', in English) which is a song that covers all the things they love about Japan. Released in July 2015, the music video went viral on YouTube, at one point gathering 1 million views in 2 days. Their second single, released in Japan on 13 January 2016, debuted at number 15 in the daily Oricon charts. Ladybeard has since withdrawn from the group. The group re-branded itself, going by "The Idol Formerly Known as Ladybaby". In 2018, the group returned to the original name after Rei left the group and three other girls joined. Ladybeard did however make a guest appearance on the EP "ホシノナイソラ -Starless_Sky-", providing additional growling vocals on the song "ビリビリマネー -Biri Biri Money-".

=== Deadlift Lolita ===
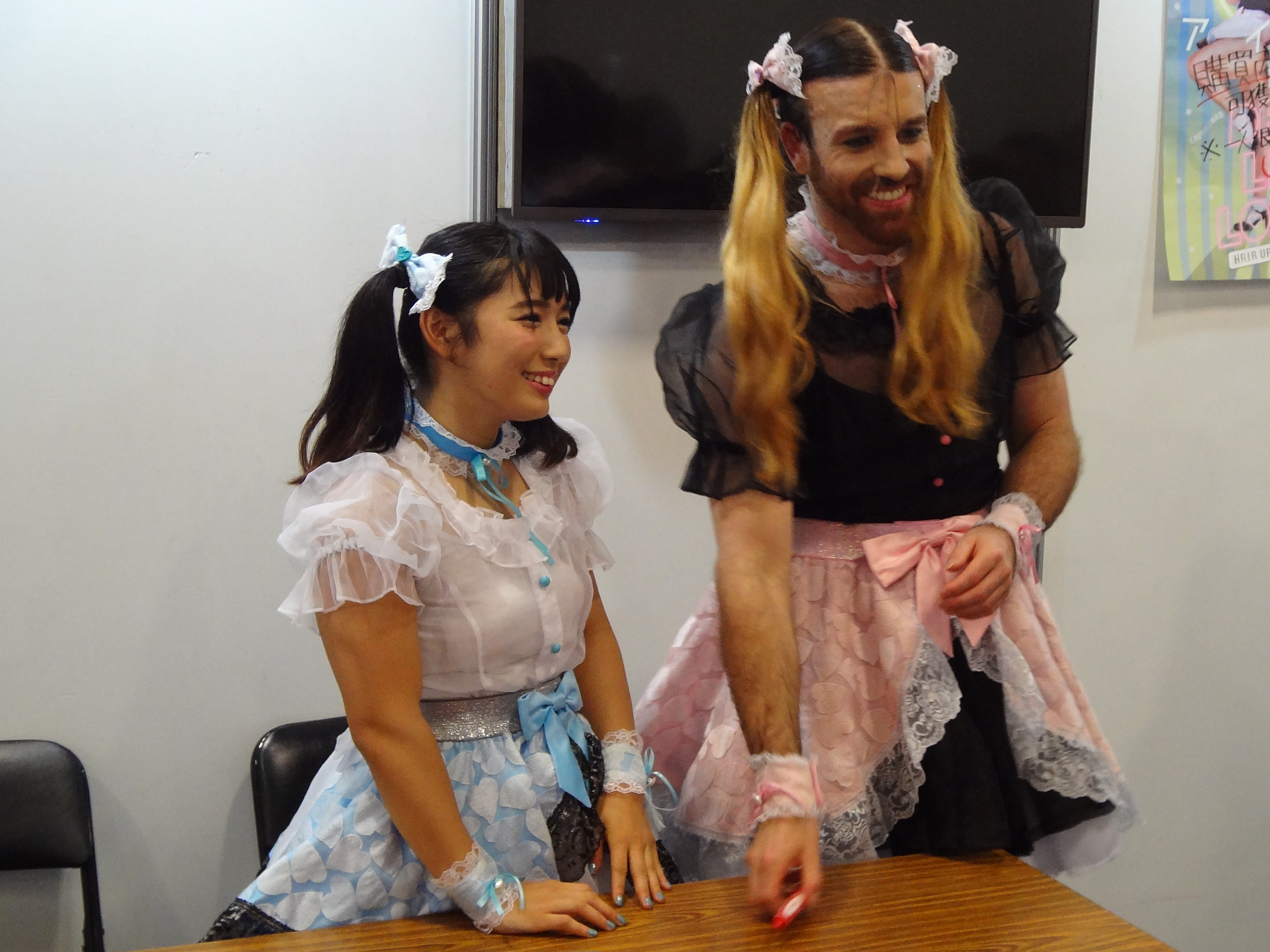
Deadlift Lolita in 2017

On 28 February 2017, Ladybeard announced the formation of a new group, "Deadlift Lolita", with bodybuilding model and wrestler Reika Saiki. They are joined by guitarist Isao Fujita, who also accompanied Babymetal. Their first single "Six Pack Twins" was released on 31 March 2017.

=== Solo and collaborations ===
On 1 January 2015 Ladybeard released the single CD bonus of the DVD "LadyBeard Justice Fight – Ai to Yuki to Bikini to Hige to -", with the single and four remixes of the song "Ladybeard Justice Fight". On 20 January 2016 Ladybeard was featured in Shiori Tomita single "Valentine Kiss Cover", version of "Valentine Kiss", from Sayuri Kokushō. On 19 October 2016 Ladybeard released a collaboration single with PEE and Yuuka Furukawa, "Wanchan Aruchan". On 28 October 2016 he released a collaboration single with the Chinese idol group ATF, "Ghost Script". On 23 May 2018 he released a collaboration single with the drummer MURATA TAMU, "Super D & D ~Kanzen ni Lead Shite I My Me~", with "D zettai! Samurai in the rain" as b-side. On 7 July 2020 he made screams in the single from Zakk Cash "Limit Break X Survivor (Dragon Ball Super Collaborative Cover) (feat. Amalee, Ladybeard, Samuel Cristea, Eric Emery, Julian Comeau, Mark Barela, Callgirl & Christian Grey"). All the proceeds from streams are going to Action Against Hunger, supporting victims of the Aussie bushfires, and those most affected by COVID.

=== Babybeard ===
On 12 April 2021, Ladybeard announced the formation of a new group called Babybeard with singers Suzu and Kotomi. Their debut releases "Nippon Kara Konnichiwa" and "PIENIZER" began streaming on 28 April 2021. "Nippon Kara Konnichiwa" reached the iTunes Store J-Pop Top Songs Top 2 in Australia on 28 April 2021, and Top 4 in the U.S. on 29 April 2021. Songs for the group were written by Takashi Asano and Natsumi Tadano, the writers of Ladybaby's "Nippon Manju".

== Podcast ==
In 2022, he launched the podcast "Cat with Beard from JAPAN".

== See also ==
- Exótico
- Kawaii metal
