= Graffiti Studio =

Bulgarian media localisation company

Graffiti Studio Графити Студио
- Industry: dubbing, voice over and subtitling
- Founded: 1993
- Website: Graffiti Studio

Graffiti Studio (Bulgarian: Графити Студио) is a Bulgarian media content localization company, providing multilingual dubbing, voice over and subtitling services to the global market in CEE languages. Graffiti Studio operates since 1993 and is based in Sofia, Bulgaria.

== Television ==
- AXN
- Baby TV
- Discovery Channel
- ESPN
- Fashion One
- Fox
- HBO
- Love Nature
- TLC

== Advertising ==
- Omnicom
- Ogilvy
- Saatchi & Saatchi
- BBDO

== Video games ==
- Atari
- Nintendo

== Film companies ==
- Warner Bros.

== E-learning ==
- Microsoft
- Adobe
- Nokia
- BMW
- Volvo
- OMV
- Shell
- HP
- Sony
- Philips
- Deutsche Telekom

== Celebrity actors ==
- Morgan Freeman
- George Clooney
- Antonio Banderas
- David Thewlis
- James Frain
- Heather Stephens
- Ben Cross

== See also ==
- Dolly Media Studio fellow dubbing based in Sofia
