= Fashion 4K =

Television channel

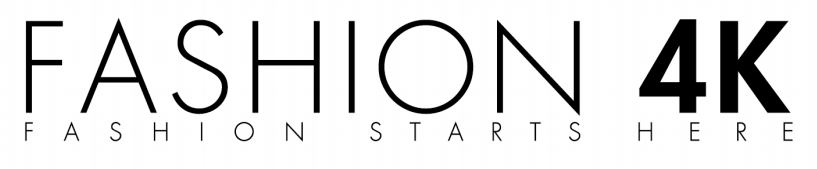
- Country: Europe
- Broadcast area: Worldwide
- Headquarters: New York City

Programming
- Language(s): English
- Picture format: 2160p (Ultra HD)

Ownership
- Owner: Fashion One
- Sister channels: Fashion One 4K

History
- Launched: September 1, 2015

Links
- Website: Fashion 4K

Fashion 4K is a satellite television channel broadcast in Europe that operates under the Fashion One television network. The channel was launched September 1, 2015, and is the first English language free-to-air channel to be broadcast in 4K resolution (or Ultra High Definition) in Europe. Fashion One also launched its sister channel Fashion One 4K in Asia, Latin America, and North America as the first true global launch of a UHD channel. Both channels operate under Fashion One's network which is owned by Bigfoot Entertainment. As of September 1, 2015, approximately 116 million households across Europe received Fashion 4K via SES S.A.'s Astra 19.2ºE satellite. Since December 2016 it became received via Eutelsat's Hot bird13°E satellite .

== Launch ==
=== Fashion One 4K ===
Fashion One 4K was launched in Asia, Latin America, and North America at the same time as Fashion 4K via MEASAT-3a, NSS-806 and SES-3 respectively.

=== Fashion One Network ===
Fashion 4K operates under the Fashion One television network along with Fashion One 4K. Before Fashion 4K, Fashion One launched F.O. and Fashion First––both local variants of the network.

=== Pre-History ===
Fashion One began updating its production format from HD to Ultra HD in 2014.

== Programming ==
Fashion 4K's original purpose was to play 4K fashion content 24 hours a day, seven days a week. Though the channel identifies primarily as a fashion channel, the channel's programming also covers lifestyle and entertainment. Fashion 4K's programming is made up of original series, featured programs and footage from a network of content providers. All footage is shot in 4K resolution.

== Original Series ==
Fashion 4K's original series have been adapted from shows that were broadcast on the Fashion One channel for 4K output.

=== Fashion On A Plate ===
This docu-series originally aired on the Fashion One channel on June 26, 2014, and returns for its second season on Fashion 4K. This series explores the relationship between food and fashion and challenges restaurants and chefs to combine the two industries on one plate.

=== Model Yoga ===
Model Yoga is a lifestyle series that also returns for its second season on Fashion 4K. The show originally aired on January 2, 2011.

=== Eco Fashion ===
Eco Fashion is a documentary series that highlights the industry of sustainable fashion. The show first aired on Fashion One on October 15, 2012, and returns for its third season on Fashion 4K.

== See also ==
- Fashion One
- Bigfoot Entertainment
