= SexyMandarin =

Educational technology company

- Company type: Private
- Founded: 2011
- Founder: Kaoru Kikuchi; Michael Gleissner
- Website: www.sexymandarin.com

SexyMandarin is a company that sells Mandarin Chinese language learning videos featuring female models. It was founded by Kaoru Kikuchi and Michael Gleissner in December 2011.
