= Ladybaby =

Japanese idol group

- Also known as: The Idol Formerly Known As LADYBABY (2016–2017)
- Origin: Japan
- Genre: Kawaii metal
- Years active: 2013–2020; 2023-Present
- Labels: Clearstone (2015–2016); King (2016–2019); JPU; Raimei (2019–2020)
- Members: Ei Tsukimachi; Sena Kurusaki; Mia Kanrei; Kino Ochi
- Past members: Ladybeard; Rei Kuromiya; Rie Kaneko; Nana Ikeda; Emily Arima; Fuka Karasawa; Sakura Tsubaki; Rem Serizawa
- Website: ladybaby-fc.com

Ladybaby is a Japanese kawaii metal musical group, which originally consisted of aspiring photographic models Rie Kaneko and Rei Kuromiya, as well as Ladybeard, the bearded crossdressing persona of Australian male professional wrestler Richard Magarey. On August 1, 2016, the group rebranded itself after Ladybeard's withdrawal from the group, going by "The Idol Formerly Known as Ladybaby", until they returned to the original Ladybaby moniker in 2018.

== History ==
Wrestler Richard Magarey, originally from Adelaide, Australia, moved to Hong Kong in 2006 to kickstart his martial arts stunt career in films, later becoming a hit in Hong Kong as cross-dressing pro wrestler Ladybeard. In October 2013, he moved to Tokyo, Japan, to attempt a similar career there. Ladybeard later formed the band with singers Rie Kaneko and Rei Kuromiya, and released their first track and music video titled "Nippon Manju" (lit. 'Japanese Bun'), which is a song that covers all the things they love about Japan. Released in July 2015, the music video went viral on YouTube, at one point gathering 1 million views in 2 days.

Their second single, released in Japan on 13 January 2016, debuted at number 15 in the daily Oricon charts.

On August 1, 2016, the group re-branded itself after Ladybeard left, by changing the group's name to "The Idol Formerly Known as Ladybaby". The remaining members had a live concert on September 16, 2016, under the new branding. In 2017 they signed to JPU Records to release new single "Pelo" in Europe. They released another single, "Pinky! Pinky!", later that year. On 17 November 2017, Rei Kuromiya left the group, citing disillusionment with idol culture and throat problems caused by the extensive touring schedule. This led to the end of the band's time as "The Idol Formerly Known as Ladybaby.

In January 2018, the group announced a memorial compilation album entitled Beside U, to be released in Japan on 7 March 2018. The international release on CD from JPU Records included an exclusive booklet design with English lyric translations and Romaji lyric transliterations. In February that year, they began teasing a new lineup, with Rie Kaneko being joined by new members Nana Ikeda, Emily Arima and Fuka Karasawa, subsequently announcing a tour through Spring 2018 in a return to the original Ladybaby moniker. They released a music video for their comeback single "Hoshi no Nai Sora" on 10 May 2018, with the single being officially released on 30 May. Ladybeard announced a return to the group to appear on one of the B-sides for the single.

On October 29, 2019, it was announced that Ladybaby would suspend all activities on January 13, 2020, after their final show, with a compilation titled Reburn released the same day.

On January 2, 2023, an announcement appeared on the group's Twitter account, teasing about a new project called "Ladybaby ✕ Heroines" which would be launched on January 8. LADYBABY PROJECT will form a new group in collaboration with the Japanese idol collective "Heroines" that belongs to the talent agency Imaginate. In line with this, auditions for new members will be held.

On November 28, 2023, all new members were announced and the debut of the 4th gen Ladybaby was set to be on December 1, 2023, at the HEROINES FES.

== Members ==
- Ei Tsukimachi (月街えい) - clean vocals
- Sena Kurusaki (來崎せな) - clean vocals
- Mia Kanrei (神黎ミア) - clean vocals
- Kino Ochi (越智 きの) - clean vocals, unclean vocals

The CHAOS

External videos
- "Haten ni Raimei", YouTube video

"The CHAOS" serves as Ladybaby's backing band in live shows, and in the music video to "Haten ni Raimei".

- Hayato Mitsuhashi (三橋隼人) – guitar
- Wu-chy – bass guitar
- HAJIMETAL – keyboards
- YOUTH-K!!! – drums

== Former members ==
- Ladybeard (レディビアード), born on 3 August 1983, withdrew August 1, 2016
- Rei Kuromiya (黒宮れい), born on 29 November 2000, withdrew November 17, 2017

Since developing into a 4-piece, the members have come to have specific roles within the band.

- Rie Kaneko (金子理江) – clean vocals (2015–2020), choreography, direction (2018–2020)
- Nana Ikeda (池田菜々) – clean vocals, rapping, costume design (2018–2020)
- Emily Arima (有馬えみり) – clean vocals, unclean vocals, lyrics (2018–2020)
- Fuka Karasawa (唐沢風花) – clean vocals (2018–2020)

LADYBABY ✕ HEROINES

- Sakura Tsubaki (椿さくら) – clean vocals, unclean vocals; went on hiatus February 18, 2024, withdrew March 2, 2024
- Rem Serizawa (芹沢レム) – clean vocals; graduated from the group on December 21, 2024 due to illness

== Discography ==
=== Singles ===
| No. | Title | Release date | Charts |
| No. | Title | Release date | JP |
|---|---|---|---|
| 1 | "Nippon Manju" (ニッポン饅頭; "Japan Manju") (Note: c/w "Ultra☆Lucky") | 29 July 2015 | 109 |
| 2 | "Age-Age Money ~Ochingin Dai Sakusen~ " (アゲアゲマネー ～おちんぎん大作戦～; "Age Age Money – Ochin – sen Daisakusen ~") (Note: c/w "Bear-chan Robot" (ビアちゃんロボット)) | 13 January 2016 | 31 |
| 3 | "Renge Chance!" (蓮華チャンス！; "Spoon chance!") (Note: c/w "C'est Si Bon Kibun" (セシボン・キブン)) | 13 April 2016 | 32 |
| 4 | "Sanpai! Gosyuin Girl" (参拝!御朱印girl☆; "Worship! Gosyuin Girl☆") (Note: c/w "Shanshanshantan" (上々上湯; "JOUJOU JOU YU") and "Onigirick Reviver" (オニギリック・リヴァイヴァー)) (The Idol Formerly Known As LADYBABY) | 30 November 2016 | 39 |
| 5 | "Pelo" (Note: c/w "LADY BABY BLUE" and "Easter Bunny") (The Idol Formerly Known As LADYBABY) | 12 April 2017 | 22 |
| 6 | "Pinky! Pinky!" (Note: c/w "Me! Me! Me!" and "Generation Hard Knocks") (The Idol Formerly Known As LADYBABY) | 27 September 2017 | 12 |
| | "Shibuya Crossing" (渋谷 CROSSING) | 10 October 2017 | — |
| 7 | "Hoshi no Nai Sora" (ホシノナイソラ) (Note: c/w "bite me" and "Biribiri Money feat.Ladybeard" (ビリビリマネー feat.Ladybeard)) | 30 May 2018 | 27 |
| | "Damedame Tono" (ダメダメ殿) | 10 October 2018 | — |
| | "Riot Anthem" (Note: 48pg Photobook w/ Lyrics and Download Card) | 8 March 2019 | — |
| 8 | "Haten ni Raimei" (破天ニ雷鳴) (Note: c/w "God's Not" and "LB 4 Future") | 28 May 2019 | 13 |
| | "Dharma Karma" (ダルマカルマ) | 12 May 2024 | — |
| | "Japasummer" (ジャパサマ) | 4 August 2024 | — |
| | "April Fish -Truth to Baby Fish- (feat. DJ BUCHO)" (4月の魚 -TRUTH to BABY FISH- (feat. DJ部長)) | 4 April 2025 | — |

=== Promotional singles ===
| Year | Title | Release date |
|---|---|---|
| 2016 | "Shōnen Yūsha-dan" (少年勇者団; "Boys brave party") | 23 June 2016 |

=== Studio albums ===
List of studio albums, with selected chart positions, sales figures and certifications
| Title | Album details | Peak chart positions | | Sales | Certifications |
| Title | Album details | JP | US^{World} | Sales | Certifications |
|---|---|---|---|---|---|
| Reburn | Released: January 13, 2020^{JP}; Label: Raimei RECORDS, LDBB RECORDS; Formats: CD, digital download; Track listing: 1. REBURN (Instrumental); 2. Hoshino Nai no Sora -Starlless Sky- (ー ホシノナイソラ); 3. Haten ni Raimei (破天ニ雷鳴); 4. LB 4 Future; 5. bite me 6. Misogi island (禊island); 7. Riot Anthem; 8. Damedame Tono (ダメダメ殿); 9. God's Not; 10. endless end Hello | — | — | | |
"—" denotes releases that did not chart or were not released in that region.

=== EPs ===
List of mini albums, with selected chart positions, sales figures and certifications
| Title | Album details | Peak chart positions | | Sales | Certifications |
| Title | Album details | JP | US^{World} | Sales | Certifications |
|---|---|---|---|---|---|
| Gotcha Nippon! (Gotcha にっぽん！) | Released: February 5, 2024^{JP}; Label: CLEARSTONE RECORDS; Formats: digital download; Track listing: 1. Gotcha Nippon! (Gotcha にっぽん！); 2. Haten ni Raimei (2024 Version) (破天ニ雷鳴 (2024 Version)); 3. Damedame Tono (2024 Version) (ダメダメ殿 (2024 Version)); 4. Riot Anthem (2024 Version); 5. C'est si bon Kibun (2024 Version) (セシボン・キブン (2024 Version)); 6. Nippon Manju (2024 Version) (ニッポン饅頭 (2024 Version)) | — | — | | |
"—" denotes releases that did not chart or were not released in that region.

=== Live albums ===
List of live albums, with selected chart positions, sales figures and certifications
| Title | Album details | Peak chart positions | | Sales | Certifications |
| Title | Album details | JP | US^{World} | Sales | Certifications |
|---|---|---|---|---|---|
| The Last Live at Liquid Room, Tokyo - January 13, 2020 | Released: November 30, 2020^{JP}; Label: CLEARSTONE RECORDS; Formats: digital download; Track listing: 1. Overture Oversea [Remix] (The LAST LIVE at LIQUID ROOM, Tokyo, 2020); 2. Nippon Manju (The LAST LIVE at LIQUID ROOM, Tokyo, 2020) (ニッポン饅頭); 3. Haten ni Raimei (The LAST LIVE at LIQUID ROOM, Tokyo, 2020) (破天ニ雷鳴); 4. Sanpai! Goshuin girl (The LAST LIVE at LIQUID ROOM, Tokyo, 2020) (参拝！御朱印girl☆); 5. Easter Bunny (The LAST LIVE at LIQUID ROOM, Tokyo, 2020); 6. Pinky Pinky (The LAST LIVE at LIQUID ROOM, Tokyo, 2020); 7. Shibuya Crossing (The LAST LIVE at LIQUID ROOM, Tokyo, 2020) (渋谷Crossing); 8. Riot Anthem (The LAST LIVE at LIQUID ROOM, Tokyo, 2020); 9. The CHAOS Session (The LAST LIVE at LIQUID ROOM, Tokyo, 2020); 10. Misogi island (The LAST LIVE at LIQUID ROOM, Tokyo, 2020) (禊island); 11. God's Not (The LAST LIVE at LIQUID ROOM, Tokyo, 2020); 12. Generation Hard Knocks (The LAST LIVE at LIQUID ROOM, Tokyo, 2020); 13. endless end Hello (The LAST LIVE at LIQUID ROOM, Tokyo, 2020); 14. C'est si bon Kibun (The LAST LIVE at LIQUID ROOM, Tokyo, 2020) (セシボン・キブン); 15. Age age Money -Ochingin Daisakusen- (The LAST LIVE at LIQUID ROOM, Tokyo, 2020) (アゲアゲマネー -おちんぎん大作戦-); 16. Hoshino Nai Sora -Starlless Sky- (The LAST LIVE at LIQUID ROOM, Tokyo, 2020) (ー ホシノナイソラ); 17. Damedame Tono (The LAST LIVE at LIQUID ROOM, Tokyo, 2020) (ダメダメ殿); 18. Nippon Manju [Out of Control Ver] (The LAST LIVE at LIQUID ROOM, Tokyo, 2020) (ニッポン饅頭) | — | — | | |
"—" denotes releases that did not chart or were not released in that region.

=== Compilation albums ===
List of compilation albums, with selected chart positions, sales figures and certifications
| Title | Album details | Peak chart positions | | Sales | Certifications |
| Title | Album details | JP | US^{World} | Sales | Certifications |
|---|---|---|---|---|---|
| ONE YEAR BEST ～2015–2016～ | Released: September 14, 2016^{JP}; Label: CLEARSTONE RECORDS; Formats: CD, digital download; Track listing: 1. OVERTURE OVERSEA; 2. Nippon Manju (ニッポン饅頭); 3. Renge Chance! (蓮華チャンス!); 4. Beard-chan Robot (ビアちゃんロボット); 5. ULTRA LUCKY; 6. C'est si bon Kibun (セシボン・キブン); 7. SCHOOL OF HARD KNOCKS; 8. Age age Money Ochingin Daisakusen (アゲアゲマネー おちんぎん大作戦) | — | — | | |
| Beside U | as The Idol Formerly Known As LADYBABY; Released: March 7, 2018; Label: KING RECORDS, JPU Records; Formats: CD, digital download; Track listing: 1. Pelo; 2. Me! Me! Me!; 3. Sanpai!Goshuin Girl (参拝!御朱印girl); 4. Easter Bunny; 5. Generation Hard Knocks; 6. Onigirikku Revival (オニギリック・リヴァイヴァー); 7. Shibuya CROSSING (渋谷 CROSSING); 8. Joujou Jou Yu (上々上湯); 9. Pinky! Pinky!; 10. LADY BABY BLUE | 49 | — | | |
"—" denotes releases that did not chart or were not released in that region.

=== Video albums ===
List of media, with selected chart positions
| Title | Album details | Peak chart positions | | Sales |
| Title | Album details | JP DVD | JP Blu-ray | Sales |
|---|---|---|---|---|
| First Japan Oneman Live ～ Sekai no Rule wo Kaechao ～ (ファースト JAPAN ワンマンライブ ～世界のルールを変えちゃおう～; First JAPAN One Man Live ~ Let's change the rules of the world ~) | Released: September 14, 2016^{JP}; Label: CLEARSTONE RECORDS; Formats: DVD; Track listing: 1. OVERTURE OVERSEA; 2. Nippon Manju (ニッポン饅頭); 3. Renge Chance! (蓮華チャンス!); 4. LOVE INNOCENT ACID KAWAII; 5. Beard-chan Robot (ビアちゃんロボット); 6. C'est si bon Kibun (セシボン・キブン); 7. ULTRA LUCKY; 8. SCHOOL OF HARD KNOCKS; 9. Age age Money Ochingin Daisakusen (アゲアゲマネー おちんぎん大作戦); 10. Renge Chance! – Encore – (蓮華チャンス! ～アンコール～); 11. C'est si bon Kibun – Encore – (セシボン・キブン ～アンコール～); 12. Nippon Manjyu – Encore – (ニッポン饅頭 ～アンコール～) | — | — | |
| Tōmei meshi TOUR2019 FINAL in SHIBUYA CLUB QUATTRO (透明飯TOUR2019 FINAL in SHIBUYA CLUB QUATTRO; Transparent rice TOUR2019 FINAL in SHIBUYA CLUB QUATTRO) | Released: August 31, 2019^{JP}; Label: CLEARSTONE RECORDS; Formats: DVD; Track listing: 1. OVERTURE OVERSEA Remix; 2. Pelo; 3. Renge Chance! (蓮華チャンス!); 4. SCHOOL OF HARD KNOCKS; 5. Sanpai!Goshuin Girl (参拝!御朱印girl); 6. Easter Bunny; 7. Generation Hard Knocks; 8. Onigirikku Revival (オニギリック・リヴァイヴァー); 9. Age age Money Ochingin Daisakusen (アゲアゲマネー ～おちんぎん大作戦～); 10. Sanpai! Goshuin Girl (参拝!御朱印girl); 11. Riot Anthem; 12. God's Not; 13. LB4 Future; 14. Haten ni Raimei (破天ニ雷鳴); 15. Love Innocent Acid Kawaii; 16. Pinky! Pinky!; 17. Damedame Tono (ダメダメ殿); 18. Nippon Manju (ニッポン饅頭) | — | — | |
| The LASTLIVE "Reburn" at LIQUIDROOM 2020.1.13 | Released: August 31, 2020^{JP}; Label: CLEARSTONE RECORDS; Formats: DVD; Track listing: 1. Overture Oversea -Remix-; 2. Nippon Manju (ニッポン饅頭); 3. Haten ni Raimei (破天ニ雷鳴); 4. Sanpai! Goshuin Girl (参拝!御朱印girl); 5. MC; 6. Easter Bunny; 7. Pinky Pinky; 8. Shibuya Crossing; 9. Riot Anthem; 10. The CHAOS Session; 11. Misogi island (禊island); 12. God's Not; 13. Generation Hard Knocks; 14. endless end Hello; 15. MC; 16. C'est si bon Kibun (セシボン・キブン); 17. Age age Money Ochingin Daisakusen (アゲアゲマネー ～おちんぎん大作戦～); 18. ～encore～ Reburn; 19. Hoshino Nai no Sora -Starlless Sky- (ー ホシノナイソラ); 20. Damedame Tono (ダメダメ殿); 21. MC; 22. Nippon Manju (ニッポン饅頭); 23. ～ending～ | — | — | |
"—" denotes releases that did not chart or were not released in that region.

=== Music videos ===
| Title | Director(s) | Originating album | Year | Ref. |
|---|---|---|---|---|
| "Nippon manju" | Ryo Shimoda | One Year Best ～2015–2016～ | 2015 | |
| "Age-Age Money" | —N/a | One Year Best ～2015–2016～ | 2015 | |
| "LADYBABY "OVERTURE OVERSEA" ～MEMORIES of 2015 ～" | —N/a | One Year Best ～2015–2016～ | 2015 | |
| "Renge Chance!" | BOZO&YGQ | One Year Best ～2015–2016～ | 2016 | |
| "C'est si bon Kibun" | Azuma Kanae | One Year Best ～2015–2016～ | 2016 | |
| "Sanpai！Gosyuin girl" (Short Ver.) | Takuya Tada | Beside U | 2016 | |
| "Easter Bunny" | IGGY COEN | Beside U | 2017 | |
| "Pelo" | Atsushi Tani | Beside U | 2017 | |
| "LADY BABY BLUE" | Rie Kaneko | Beside U | 2017 | |
| "Pinky! Pinky!" | Pink janakute mo | Beside U | 2017 | |
| "Starless_Sky" | Mami Yamabe | Reburn | 2018 | |
| "Biri Biri Money" (feat. Ladybeard) | Ryuichi Takashiba | Hoshi no Nai Sora | 2018 | |
| "bite me" | Rie Kaneko | Reburn | 2018 | |
| "damedame tono" | Sari Kodaka | Reburn | 2018 | |
| "LADYBABY "God's Not" ～Memories of 2018 ～" | Naoto Wakamatsu | Reburn | 2018 | |
| "Riot Anthem" | Rie Kaneko | Reburn | 2019 | |
| "Haten ni Raimei" | Sari Kodaka | Reburn | 2019 | |
| "endless end Hello" | Sari Kodaka | Reburn | 2019 | |
| "Misogi island" | Sari Kodaka | Reburn | 2020 | |
| "Gotcha NIPPON!" | Shishikaba | Gotcha NIPPON! | 2023 | |
| "endless end Hello ～Memories of ’23-24 ～" | JINNKURU | TBA | 2024 | |
| "Easter Bunny Music Clip 2025 ver. " | JINNKURU | TBA | 2025 | |

== Media appearances ==
=== TV ===
| Year | Title | Role | Network | Notes |
|---|---|---|---|---|
| 2016–2020 | Nadarezaka Rock | co-MCs | BS Japan | Japanese variety show |

=== Radio ===
| Year | Title | Role | Network | Notes |
|---|---|---|---|---|
| 2019 | LADYBABY MUSIC O'CLOCK | MCs | Backstage Café (BSC Radio) | Japanese variety radio show |

== Bibliography ==
- Rie Kaneko, Rei Kuromiya, LADYBABY PROJECT (December 1, 2017), Zmagazine (in Japanese) (Large book ed.), Tokyo: CLEARSTONE BOOKS, ISBN 978-4-907-30157-6
- LADYBABY (March 8, 2019), LBmagazine (in Japanese) (Mook ed.), Tokyo: CLEARSTONE BOOKS, ISBN 978-4-907-30185-9
- LADYBABY, Īda Erika (March 8, 2019), 『Riot Anthem』Lyric Book (in Japanese) (Paperback (soft cover) ed.), Tokyo, Japan: CLEARSTONE BOOKS, ISBN 978-4-909837-07-3
