= International Academy of Film and Television =

Film institute in Lapu-Lapu City, Philippines

- Type: Private film school
- Established: 2004
- CEO: Ali Gursoy
- Location: Lapu-Lapu City, Cebu, Philippines; 10°18′40″N 124°00′21″E
- Website: www.iaft.net

The International Academy of Film and Television (IAFT) is a trade film school offering diploma and certificate programs in filmmaking, acting, and 3D animation. IAFT includes significant amounts of hands-on practical experience under the care and guidance of recognized industry mentors in its programs. IAFT Cebu was also voted as "one of the best film schools in the world" by the Hollywood Reporter.

== History ==
In 2004 Bigfoot Entertainment began training Cebuanos in camera operation. Within a year, in response to the growing demand for film education, the doors of IAFT were opened to full-time filmmaking students. The school was formed with the intention of hiring graduates for the affiliates, Bigfoot Studios and Fashion TV Philippines and Singapore. IAFT has expanded to offer certificate and diploma programs in filmmaking, acting and 3D animation, as well as short-term workshops.

== Programs ==
IAFT offers diploma and certificate programs in filmmaking and acting. The schools course of study includes sound design, photography, and script writing. IAFT's programs incorporate a minimum of 60 hours of internship within the professional industry, and acting programs require public performance to be undertaken regularly.

- Diploma Program in Filmmaking
- Certificate Program in Filmmaking
- Diploma Program in Performing Arts - Acting
- Certificate Program in Performing Arts - Acting
- Diploma Program in 3D Animation
- Certificate Program in 3D Animation
- Short-term Workshops e.g. On-camera Acting Workshop & Filmmaking Workshop

== Notable alumni ==
- Sujay Dahake - known for his work as director and as editor for the film Shala, Ajoba and Phuntroo
- Jamie Herrell - known for winning the Miss Philippines Earth 2014 and Miss Earth 2014 titles

== Accreditations ==
- Technical Education and Skills Development Authority
- Bureau of Immigration (Philippines)
- United States Veteran Association (USVA)

== Affiliates ==
- Parent Company - Bigfoot Entertainment
- Sister Company - Fashion One
- Educational Partner - Final Draft
