= Rie Kaneko =

Japanese–Filipino model, actress, and singer

- 金子理江
- Born: 18 December 1997 (age 28); Tokyo, Japan
- Occupations: Singer; Gravure idol; Fashion model; Performer; Actress
- Musical career
- Genres: Kawaii metal; J-pop; heavy metal
- Years active: 2013–present
- Formerly of: Ladybaby
- Website: ilie-official.com

Rie Kaneko (Japanese: 金子理江, Hepburn: Kaneko Rie; born 18 December 1997) is a Japanese–Filipino gravure idol, actress, fashion model and singer best known for being a member of Ladybaby.

== Background ==
Kaneko's mother is Spanish of Filipino descent and her father is Japanese.

In September 2014 Rie Kaneko was co-Grand Prix winner (along with Shizu Mizuno) of the 2015 Miss iD audition. In her audition video Kaneko danced "Loving U" from K-pop group SISTAR.

In March 2015, along with Rei Kuromiya, a nominated Miss iD 2015, and Ladybeard, a crossdressing professional wrestler, formed the idol group "LADYBABY". In August of the same year, she featured on Haji Metal's "GIRI GAL". She also sang track numbers 2, 4, and 6 of "SUPER SOLO 2" which is a bundled album of GIRIGAL.

February 2016, Kaneko obtained the Grand Prix at Hakusensha "Young Animal" NEXT Gravure Queen Battle 4th Season. In March 2016, in an interview to the high school graduation of the week pre-News, she talked about "I did not like being told to be a high school student", and has since dropped out of high school. On 1 August 2016, after the band rebranded from "LADYBABY" to "The Idol Formerly Known As LADYBABY" the band resumed their activities after a hiatus.

Since June 2017, she started her own channel called "Rie Kaneko's "Title Missed" channel" at the video distribution service "FRESH!", operated by Cyber Agent, and periodically delivers member-only live delivery. On 18 September, she held her first fan meeting on this channel.

== Ilie ==
Kaneko debuted under the solo project Ilie (stylized: ilie) on 10 July 2021, with "aimai" as its first music video uploaded on its official YouTube channel; itself created on 6 July 2021. This has since been followed by further music video uploads on 20 August 2021, with "fukashigi", 1 September 2021 with "syukufuku", and on 30 October 2021, with "kamishibai".

Japanese composer Sakurai Kenta of Ekoms Co. Ltd. serves as Ilie's label manager and music producer. The label also works with Japanese artists such as KATY, and Haze.

A November 2021 tour was announced on 30 September 2021. It had three dates: 12, 14 November, and 18 respectively.

Ilie announced its official fan club at its official Twitter page on 1 January 2022.

== REIRIE ==
In January 2023, Kaneko got back together with Rei Kuromiya to form the idol group REIRIE after working separately for five years. The group announced their first live shortly after debut, which occurred on 24 March 2023.

== Discography ==
=== As ilie ===
Year	Title	Album
2021	"aimai"	syukufuku EP
2021	"fukashigi"	syukufuku EP
2021	"syukufuku"	syukufuku EP
2021	"kamishibai"	syukufuku EP
2022	"uragaeshi"	uragaeshi

=== As trolleattroll ===
Year	Title	Album
2017	"lost"	non-album singles
2017	"blues"	non-album singles

=== As featured artist ===
Year	Title	Artist	Album
2015	"GIRI GAL"	Hajimetal	Super Solo 2
2015	"Hardcore Summer Vacation" (feat. Mishio Ogawa & hiroponn)	Hajimetal	Super Solo 2
2015	"Love & Peace Generation"	Hajimetal	Super Solo 2
2015	"Life is like a roller coaster" (feat. Mishio Ogawa)	Hajimetal	Super Solo 2
2016	"Maybe, I'll be with you"	Hajimetal	promo single
2019	ぼくのじゃない (Rie Kaneko ver.) (Boku no janai)	sleepyhead	promo single

== Videography ==
=== Movies ===
Year	Title	Role	Notes
2016	Be A Light to the World	Rei	
2017	Saki	Tomoki Sawamura	

=== TV shows ===
Year	Title	Role	Network	Notes
2016	Saki	Tomoki Sawamura	TBS/ MBS	TV Mini-series
2016–present	Nadarezaka Rock	MC	BSJapan	

=== Music Videos ===
Year	Title	Artist
2014	さよならのいきもの (Sayonara no Iki Mono)	GOOD BYE APRIL
2015	Imitation Girl	Seiko Oomori
2015	GIRI GAL （featuring Rie Kaneko）	HAJIMETAL
2016	Maybe, I'll be with you （featuring Rie Kaneko）	HAJIMETAL
2017	そっ閉じ 青春 (Sottoji seishun)	NICHOME NO SAKIGAKE COMINGOUT
2019	ぼくのじゃない (Original ver.) (Boku no janai)	sleepyhead
2019	ぼくのじゃない (Rie Kaneko ver.) (Boku no janai)	sleepyhead

=== Gravure Idol DVDs ===
Year	Title
2016	INNOCENCE
2016	emotion

== Bibliography ==
- 2015: Sayonara Youthful Days Miss iD 2015 Official Photo Collection Book ISBN 978-4990834609
- 2016: Rie Kaneko [Calendar 2017 (Try-X Ltd.)]
- 2017: Kaneko Rie First Photo Book Let me do Whatever I want ISBN 978-4575313093
- 2017: Kaneko Rie First Trading Card
- 2018: Kaneko Rie −20- Trading Card Box
- 2018: LADYBABY Rie Kaneko Photobook: ambiguous ISBN 978-4907301958
- 2018: Kaneko Rie -SAYONARA HEISEI- Vol.3 Trading Card Box
- 2019: Rie Kaneko Photobook: NEVER END BLUE ISBN 978-4909837592
