= 9000 Needles =

- Directed by: Doug Dearth
- Produced by: Kacy Andrews; Michael Gleissner; Caroleen Feeney; Stephen Nemeth; Igor Desyatnikov
- Edited by: William T. Cartwright Jr. Doug Dearth; Kristoffer Villarino
- Music by: Laurence Tolhurst; David Robbins
- Distributed by: Bigfoot Ascendant
- Release dates: October 2009 (Louisville); September 16, 2011 (United States)
- Running time: 83 minutes
- Country: United States
- Language: English

9000 Needles is a 2009 documentary film about the story of a young husband and father and his family as they struggle to deal with the aftermath of a devastating stroke. It was directed by Doug Dearth.

== Background ==
The film documents the fate of Devin Dearth, a successful businessman and champion body builder who suffered a devastating stroke caused by a bleed in his brain stem, leaving him paralyzed on his right side, unable to walk, and with difficulty speaking. With the help of his brother Doug (film director), they then travel to Tianjin, China to try a stroke rehabilitation center that uses acupuncture and traditional Chinese Medicine.

== Awards ==
- Dove Foundation: Five Doves family friendly review
- Temecula Valley International Film Festival 2010 Best Documentary
- Phoenix Film Festival 2010 Best Documentary and Audience Award
- DocuWest Film Festival 2010 Best Feature Length Documentary
- Louisville International Festival of Film 2009 1st runner-up: Audience Award
- Cleveland International Film Festival 2010 1st runner-up: Audience Award
- Mammoth Film Festival 2009 1st Runner-Up: Best Documentary
