= Christian Jagodzinski =

German entrepreneur and real estate investor

- Education: LMU Munich
- Occupations: Internet entrepreneur and real estate investor

Christian Jagodzinski is a German multi-millionaire Internet entrepreneur and real estate investor. He has developed and turned around many businesses, most notably Telebuch.de, the first online book retailer.

== Career ==
Jagodzinski began his entrepreneurial career at the age of 16 in Regensburg, Germany, where he set up his own computer software writing company. While managing several dot.com businesses in the 1990s, he attended LMU Munich, from which he received an MBA. Jagodzinski became an online pioneer at 21 years of age with the launch of the first e-commerce company. He is the founder of the first German Internet book retailer Telebooks (Telebuch), which he and his partner Michael Gleissner sold to Amazon.com along with its subsidiaries in 1998 for an undisclosed amount. Jagodzinski took on a position with Amazon as a director of European business development before selling his shares of the company, estimated at $55 million.

Jagodzinski's other successful Internet venture was "WWW-Service GmbH", which became the leading web hosting provider in Germany and Spain. In October 1998, the company was sold to Verio (later NTT).

Jagodzinski retired from the dot.com business at the age of 29.

=== Real Estate ===
In 2000, Jagodzinski relocated to Miami Beach, where he is a current investor in the luxury real estate and hospitality sector. He is presently the chairman and CEO of Desdemona Capital, a real estate and private equity investment company, which has a portfolio of software companies.

He is also the founder and president of Villazzo, a high-end villa rental business concept founded on Jagodzinski's own idea of an “ultimate vacation”, focused on luxury and privacy. The company offers the services and amenities of a three-star hotel at exclusive villas in St. Tropez, Aspen and Miami Beach.
