= USS Cooper: Return to Ormoc Bay =

- Directed by: Daniel Foster
- Written by: Daniel Foster
- Produced by: Daniel Foster; Leica Cruz
- Starring: Rob Lalumiere; Hank Wagener; Richard Sementelli; Veda Kelley
- Release date: 2006
- Country: Philippines
- Language: English

USS Cooper: Return to Ormoc Bay is a 2005 Philippine documentary film produced by Bigfoot Entertainment and directed by Daniel Foster. The film documents the fate of an American destroyer that was torpedoed during World War II.

== Synopsis ==
A daring world record scuba dive to the sunken USS Cooper is witnessed by a man who nearly perished on that same ship over sixty years ago. The destroyer was found to be at a depth of 633 feet (193 meters) – deeper than the world record technical dive of 581 feet (177 meters).

Traveling to dangerous depths, this film takes the time to remember fallen heroes, honor comrades and acknowledge those who made great sacrifices. The film explores the state of tragedy, the incomprehension we face when confronted with great, unspeakable loss.

This documentary features Rob Lalumiere's record-breaking 193-meter dive to place a memorial plaque on the shipwreck.

== Production Team ==
- Director/director: Daniel Foster
- Producers: Daniel Foster, Leica Cruz
- Executive Producers: Michael Gleissner, Kacy Andrews, Matt Lubetich
- Associate Producer: Jeneth Borlasa
- Director of photography: Eugene Florendo
- Underwater videographer: Jacques Tarnero
- Editors: Daniel Foster, Kristoffer Villarino
- Composer: Mark Ambervill

== Interview Subjects ==
- Rob Lalumiere: Diver
- Hank Wagener: Survivor
- Richard Sementelli: Eye Witness
- Veda Kelley: Widowed wife

== CGI and animation ==
CGI and animation were crucial design elements in USS Cooper: Return to Ormoc Bay. Both were used to fill in story gaps and augment various memories by simulating the USS Cooper and creating movement within charts and old photographs. The night of December 3, 1944, springs to life in the documentary, replete with its inherent terror, chaos and suspense.

Battle scenes feature a recreation of the USS Cooper as it dodges torpedoes, fires off salvos and careens through the moonlit night. The animators extensively researched how the ship sailed, sounded and turned. A model of the ship was created using Maya software, and was given motion, lighting and texture to bring it to life. Other key elements in these scenes involve accurate portrayal of waves, torpedo trajectories and munitions fire. In the documentary USS Cooper: Return to Ormoc Bay, the USS Cooper sails once again.

The animators brought subtle movement to 1940s photographs and documents donated by survivors and their families into which they breathed on new life, such as cigarette smoke wafts from a cigarette, sailors' hats soar in the air and champagne bursts from a bottle during the USS Cooper dedication ceremonies.

Since the documentary involves the complicated sport of technical diving, the CGI team also animated dive charts and decompression and gas mixing schedules to convey the intricacy of the dive, as well as the danger involved.
