= World Fashion Channel =

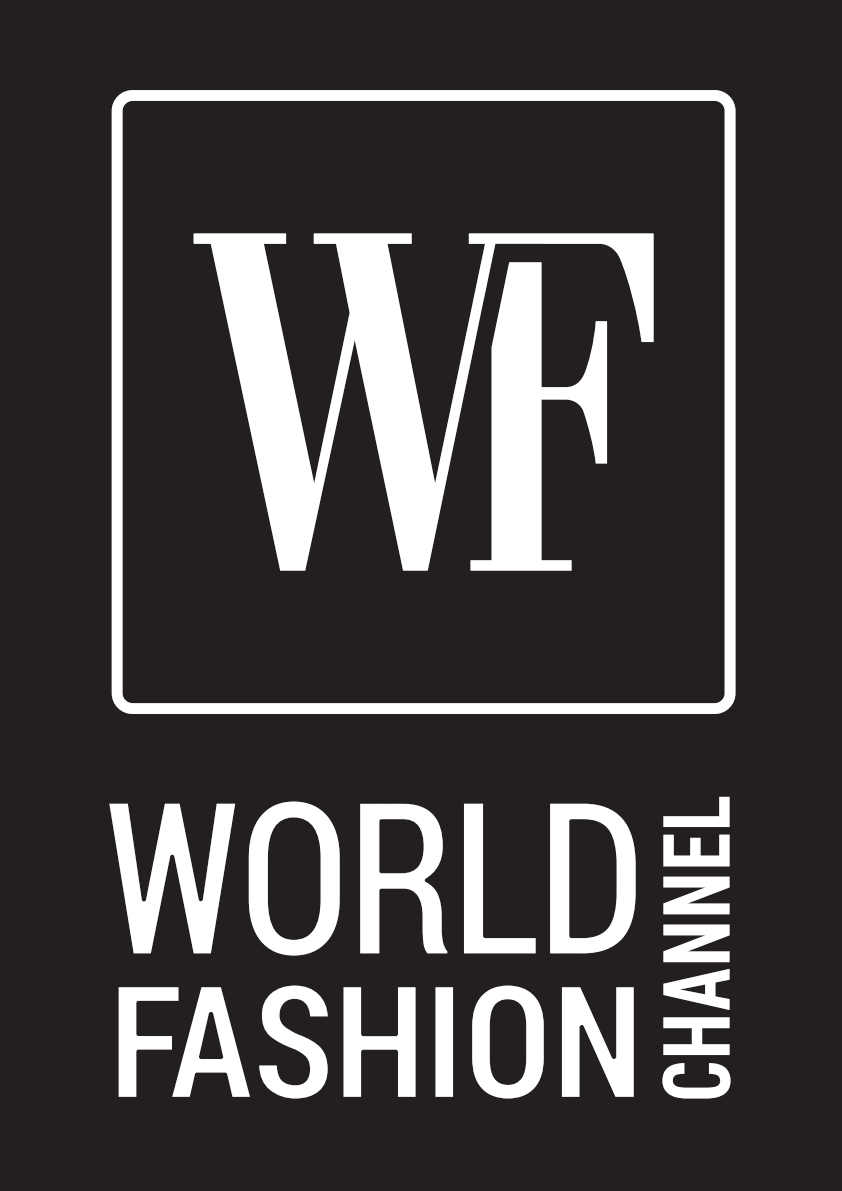
- Country: United States, Italy and Russia
- Headquarters: Milan, Italy & Moscow, Russia

Programming
- Languages: English, Italian and Russian
- Picture format: 1080i HDTV

Ownership
- Owner: Igor Kesaev & Marina Artemieva

History
- Launched: 2005

Links
- Website: wfc.tv

World Fashion Channel is an international satellite and cable television channel covering contemporary trends in fashion, beauty, travel, and lifestyle. There are two versions of the channel broadcasting 24/7: Russian-language broadcasts are available in Russia and CIS countries, while English-language broadcasts are available in other countries around the world.

The channel broadcasts key shows and fashion weeks, global events and programs, and international projects of its own production.

== Description ==
World Fashion Channel has a Russian and an international version:

- The Russian version of the channel (all content is translated into Russian) covers Russia and the CIS countries, and has more than 20.25 million viewers.
- The international version covers Europe, Asia and the Asia-Pacific region, Australia, America, Canada, Middle East, Russia, CIS and Baltic countries; it has more than 18.5 million viewers.

The channel covers and reports on fashion events and trends worldwide.

World Fashion Channel established the World Fashion Luxury Awards to celebrate achievements of the premium segment brands.

== See also ==
- FashionTV
- Luxe.tv
