= Michel Adam Lisowski =

Polish businessman

Michel Adam Lisowski is a Polish businessman and the founder and sole owner of FashionTV.

== Biography ==
Michel Adam Lisowski was born on April 16, 1950, in Warsaw to a family of Jewish descent. In 1958, he moved to Vienna where his father served as a diplomat at the International Atomic Energy Agency for the Polish government. After high school, Lisowski was granted a scholarship for Mathematics at Princeton University.

Lisowski started a textile business in Thailand called "Eden Group" and is currently the President of Fashion TV (FTV), for which he also runs the franchise "love-f-cafe" in various European cities, including Monaco and Milan.

In 2013, he returned to Vienna with the opening of the café on the ground floor of the Hotel Bristol next to the opera house.
