= Bebe Pham =

Vietnamese model and actress (born 1983)

Bebe Phạm
- Born: Phạm Thị Thúy; April 3, 1983 (age 43); Bien Hoa, Vietnam
- Occupations: Actress, Fashion model
- Spouse: Dustin Nguyen (m. 2012)
- Children: 4

Bebe Phạm (born Phạm Thị Thúy; April 3, 1983 in Bien Hoa, Vietnam) is a Vietnamese model and actress.

She splits her time between Singapore, Los Angeles and Cebu, Philippines, where she is involved with shooting movies for Bigfoot Entertainment.

== Personal life ==
In 2012, she married Vietnamese actor Dustin Nguyen of 21 Jump Street fame. They have four daughters.

== Filmography ==
As an actress, Bebe Pham has starred in the following movies:

- Midnight Movie as Roxanne (USA, 2007)
- Deep Gold Lead Actress, (Philippines 2007)
- Irreversi as Fashion Show Model (Hong Kong, 2008)
- Victim of Circumstance Lead Actress, (Vietnam-USA 2009)
- Hui Lu as Fashion Show Model (China, 2009)
- The Girl with No Number, as Phuong Ly (USA, 2012)
