= Fashion One =

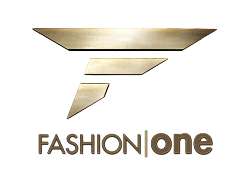
- Fashion One
- Broadcast area: Worldwide
- Headquarters: New York City

Programming
- Language: English
- Picture format: 1080i (Full HD); 2160i/4320p (4K/8K resolution Ultra HD)

Ownership
- Owner: Bigfoot Entertainment
- Sister channels: Fashion One 4K; Fashion 4K

History
- Launched: April 8, 2010; 15 years ago
- Closed: 2019; (Africa); 2 years ago

Links
- Website: www.fashionone.com

Availability

Streaming media
- myTV SUPER (Hong Kong): Channel 603 (HD)

Fashion One is a 24-hour New York City-based television network founded by German entrepreneur, Michael Gleissner and owned by the Miami Beach, Florida-based entertainment company, Bigfoot Entertainment. Launched on April 8, 2010, the New York City-based television network broadcasts programming related to fashion, entertainment and lifestyle.

== History ==
Michael Gleissner, a German entrepreneur founded and established the channel and its parent company, Miami Beach, Florida-based Bigfoot Entertainment, in 2004. The Fashion One Channel was officially launched on April 8, 2010 under Fashion One Television LLC. It was initially available in the United States, United Kingdom, Australia and New Zealand to millions of households across free-to-air and direct-to-home satellites. It was then distributed globally via three satellites, namely the Galaxy 19 at 97°W, Hot Bird at 13°E and AsiaSat 3S at 105.5°E. The channel raised US$14 million in September to boost its in-house production slate as well as expanding its reach by adding more satellite television capacity and upgrading existing broadcasts to Full HD. Fashion One TV network later expanded its operation in Hong Kong, Taiwan, Africa, Western Europe and the United States It updated its production format from Full HD to Ultra HD in 2014 and officially launched Fashion 4K under the Fashion One television network on September 1, 2015.

== Programming ==
Fashion One's programming is divided into two categories: core programming and original programming. The core programming primarily consists of content which is provided by external parties, while the original programming is produced by the network itself.

== Other channels ==
Fashion One television network also includes the channels Fashion One HD, Fashion 4K and Fashion One 4K.

=== Fashion One 4K ===
Fashion One 4K is a satellite television channel broadcast in Asia, Latin America and North America that operates under the Fashion One television network. The channel was officially launched on September 1, 2015, and is the first English language free-to-air channel to broadcast in 4K/8K resolution (or Ultra High Definition) in the continents mentioned above.

Fashion One also officially launched its sister channel Fashion 4K in Europe, making both channels the first true international launch of an Ultra HD channel.

== See also ==
- FashionTV
- World Fashion Channel
