= Rebekah Brandes =

American actress

- Born: June 28, 1985 (age 41); Detroit, Michigan, USA
- Occupation: Film actress

Rebekah Brandes (born June 28, 1985) is an American-born film and television actress and writer. She was born in Royal Oak, Michigan, United States, and has appeared in five television shows and 14 films — the first, in 2005, was Slaughter Party and the most recent, coming out in 2027, is The Good Dark.

== Biography ==
Notable projects include Bellflower, in which her performance as Courtney, "a nymphet with a .45" garnered positive reviews by like the likes of Variety and Paste; Nothing Left to Fear, in which The New York Times recognized her as having "Charm," produced and scored by Slash of Guns N' Roses; and Midnight Movie. She has also appeared on television shows Justified, NCIS, Criminal Minds, Greek and the series The Forgotten starring Christian Slater. She attended the renowned American Academy of Dramatic Arts. She graduated summa cum laude from the University of California, Los Angeles, where she majored in English literature and minored in professional writing.

She is also a writer and editor. Her writing has been published in MAD Magazine, Trill! Magazine, Los Angeles Magazine, and BuzzFeed. She's currently a staff editor for Nice News, an Encyclopedia Britannica property.

== Early life ==
Brandes was born in Royal Oak, Michigan. She is the only daughter of Elaine Katz, an artist, and Wayne Brandes, a physician. She has three brothers.
