= Nothing Left to Fear (film) =

2013 film by Anthony Leonardi III

- Theatrical release poster
- Directed by: Anthony Leonardi III
- Written by: Jonathan W. C. Mills
- Produced by: Slash
- Starring: Anne Heche; James Tupper; Ethan Peck; Jennifer Stone; Rebekah Brandes; Clancy Brown
- Cinematography: Martin Coppen
- Edited by: Howard E. Smith
- Music by: Nicholas O'Toole; Slash
- Production companies: Anchor Bay Films; Slasher Films; Movie Package Company
- Distributed by: Anchor Bay Films
- Release dates: September 26, 2013 (Russia); October 4, 2013 (United States)
- Running time: 100 minutes
- Country: United States
- Language: English

Nothing Left to Fear is a 2013 American supernatural horror film directed by Anthony Leonardi III. The film received some coverage due to its association with the Guns N' Roses band member Slash, as this marked the first film produced through his production company Slasher Films. The film was first released on September 26, 2013, in Russia and was released later the same year in the United States.

The film was inspired by the urban legends surrounding Stull, Kansas, which is rumored to be home to one of the "Seven Known Gateways to Hell".

== Plot ==
Pastor Dan, his wife Wendy, and their three children Rebecca, Mary, and Christopher move to Stull, Kansas, where Dan will become the new pastor. On the way, Rebecca sees a teenage boy, Noah, killing a sheep and collecting its blood. After meeting a local farmer, Mason, Dan and his family settle into their new home with help from the elderly Pastor Kingsman and parish members. That night, Rebecca has a nightmare.

The following day, Kingsman gives the family a cake baked by a parish member. Mary chokes on a tooth baked into her slice. Rebecca later meets Noah, who takes her sightseeing around town until Mason arrives to take him to Kingsman. Kingsman tells Noah that he must do what is required because it is God's will. Noah reluctantly explains that Mary has been chosen because she found the tooth, which is part of a lottery: whoever discovers it first is selected.

As the Summer Festival approaches, Rebecca meets Noah again and the two go on a date at the fire lookout tower in the surrounding forest. She notices a scar on his hand and a man watching them from below the tower. At the festival the next day, Noah takes Rebecca and Mary for lemonade. Mary's drink is poisoned, making her violently ill, and Mason kidnaps her while she attempts to return home. She awakens tied to a post, where Kingsman tells her she has been chosen according to God's will. He opens the "Gateway to Hell", allowing the Devil to possess Mary, then returns her to her family and claims she was merely sick.

Noah attempts to tell Rebecca what happened but is interrupted by Christopher. Meanwhile, Kingsman summons Dan to the church, drugs him and imprisons him. At home, the possessed Mary vomits a black substance and attacks Wendy, who sends Rebecca and Christopher to find their father. With Noah's help, they enter the church and rescue Dan. On the way home, they notice every house marked with a blood-red 'X'. Rebecca repeatedly questions Noah, but he refuses to explain.

At home, Dan finds Wendy dead and crumbling away on the sofa, then sees Mary crawling towards him. He flees, telling Rebecca and Noah to drive away. Dan stays behind to confront Mary, but she kills him. Rebecca forces Noah to explain, and he reveals that the same thing happened to him and his family years earlier. Christopher runs to a nearby house for help, but Mary infects him. When she pursues him, Noah runs her over, allowing Rebecca to rescue Christopher. Noah leaves them in the street, telling Rebecca to flee if Mary returns, but the car soon loses power. Mary catches up, and although Noah tries to restrain Rebecca, she kills Christopher.

Noah takes Rebecca to an abandoned church, where Mary soon arrives. Noah cuts Rebecca's wrist and uses her blood to destroy the Devil and close the Gateway to Hell, killing Mary in the process. As Rebecca lies unconscious, the townspeople gather around her while a light emanates from the centre. Later, another family moves to Stull. Their son catches Rebecca's attention after killing a sheep and taking Noah's place.

== Cast ==
- Anne Heche as Wendy
- James Tupper as Dan
- Ethan Peck as Noah
- Rebekah Brandes as Rebecca
- Carter Cabassa as Christopher
- Wayne Pére as Mason
- Jennifer Stone as Mary
- Clancy Brown as Pastor Kingsman
- Morgan Roberts as new boy

== Production ==
Plans to film Nothing Left to Fear were first announced in 2010, when Slash announced his intent to launch his production company Slasher Films with Nothing Left to Fear as its flagship film. Thomas Haden Church was initially named as one of the stars of the film, but his name was later removed from the production for unspecified reasons. Clancy Brown and Ethan Peck were added to the cast in early 2012, joining Anne Heche and James Tupper. Filming began on May 14, 2012 in Covington, Louisiana and film rights for Nothing Left to Fear were purchased by Anchor Bay.

== Release ==
The film was first released on September 26, 2013 in Russia and received a limited theatrical release on October 4 of the same year in the United States, alongside a video on demand release, before being released on DVD and Blu-ray Disc the following Tuesday.

== Soundtrack ==
An official soundtrack was released for Nothing Left to Fear on October 31, 2013, to coincide with the world release of the film.

The music was written and produced by Slash and Nicholas O'Toole. The soundtrack is mostly film scoring but includes two songs, one of which features vocals by Myles Kennedy. Prior to writing the score, Slash approached Leonardi with several musical styles and asked Leonardi to choose which style best fit the film. Of composing the soundtrack, Slash opined that he found it "nothing like if [he's] writing with a band in mind" and that writing music for a story and concept was "not constricted by songwriting" and was a "great departure for [him]".

=== Track list ===
No.	Title	Writer(s)	Performer	Length
1.	"The Road to Stull"	Slash, Nicholas O'Toole
2.	"Cold Welcome"	Slash, Nicholas O'Toole
3.	"Lamb's Blood"	Slash, Nicholas O'Toole
4.	"One Choice, Two Fates"	Slash, Nicholas O'Toole
5.	"A Prayer"	Slash, Nicholas O'Toole
6.	"Dark Dreams"	Slash, Nicholas O'Toole
7.	"Sermon"	Slash, Nicholas O'Toole
8.	"The Tooth"	Slash, Nicholas O'Toole
9.	"Retrieval"	Slash, Nicholas O'Toole
10.	"Silent Secrets"	Slash, Nicholas O'Toole
11.	"Pain and Premonition Part 1"	Slash, Nicholas O'Toole
12.	"Pain and Premonition Part 2"	Slash, Nicholas O'Toole
13.	"Observations"	Slash, Nicholas O'Toole
14.	"The Secret Tower"	Slash, Nicholas O'Toole
15.	"Do Your Part"	Slash, Nicholas O'Toole
16.	"Don't Forget"	Slash, Nicholas O'Toole
17.	"A Flash and a Feeling"	Slash, Nicholas O'Toole
18.	"Abduction"	Slash, Nicholas O'Toole
19.	"Bleeding In"	Slash, Nicholas O'Toole
20.	"Urgency"	Slash, Nicholas O'Toole
21.	"Have Faith"	Slash, Nicholas O'Toole
22.	"The Decline"	Slash, Nicholas O'Toole
23.	"Trauma"	Slash, Nicholas O'Toole
24.	"The Blood Lust"	Slash, Nicholas O'Toole
25.	"Our Broken Home"	Slash, Nicholas O'Toole
26.	"Revelations"	Slash, Nicholas O'Toole
27.	"No Safety in Numbers"	Slash, Nicholas O'Toole
28.	"Childhood's End"	Slash, Nicholas O'Toole
29.	"The Fear"	Slash, Nicholas O'Toole
30.	"The Perfect Circle"	Slash, Nicholas O'Toole
31.	"Nothing Left to Fear"	Slash, Nicholas O'Toole	Slash, Myles Kennedy
32.	"Welcome to Stull"	Slash, Nicholas O'Toole

== Reception ==
Critical reception for Nothing Left to Fear has been overwhelmingly negative. The film holds a rating of 12 on Metacritic based upon reviews by 7 critics indicating "overwhelming dislike." Ratings on Rotten Tomatoes are also negative; the film holds a rating of 10% approval rating based on 10 reviews, with an average score of 3.21/10. Critics panned the film as "dull" and criticized it for its lack of scares. Los Angeles Times remarked that "director Anthony Leonardi III and writer Jonathan Mills have let not one scary moment on screen" and that actors Heche and Tupper should write apology notes to their fans. In their review, The Hollywood Reporter joked on the film's title, saying that the "title of this perfunctory horror film proves all too prophetic." Variety also gave a negative review and commented that the film "features fewer small-town scares than a rerun of Dawson’s Creek and more wooden acting than a marionette theater".
