= Bigfoot Entertainment =

American entertainment company

- Company logo
- Type: Private
- Industry: Entertainment
- Founded: 2002; 24 years ago
- Founder: Michael Gleissner
- Headquarters: Lapu-Lapu City, Cebu, Philippines; Miami Beach, Florida, United States
- Area served: Asia-Pacific
- Key people: Ashley Jordan (CEO)
- Products: Motion pictures Television programs
- Services: Film production Television production Education; Community outreach
- Number of employees: 250
- Website: bigfoot.com

Bigfoot Entertainment is the American parent company of Bigfoot Films, Bigfoot Productions, Bigfoot Production Services, Bigfoot Partners, the International Academy of Film and Television, New Cebu Films and Fashion One Network. The Bigfoot Group operates as an independent feature film and TV production and distribution company that develops, produces, and finances media content, including independent feature films, television series, reality shows, filmmaking education, and community outreach. The company's studios is in Cebu, Philippines, while its headquarters are located in Miami Beach, Florida, United States.

== Background ==
Bigfoot Entertainment was founded in 2002 by German entrepreneur Michael Gleissner to finance and develop feature films, documentaries, and reality TV shows. Productions have been filmed at the company's Bigfoot Studios in the Philippines as well as on location in the United States, Hong Kong, China, Africa, Europe, the Philippines, and Vietnam.

The studio facilities includes six sound stages and a post-production site. It was initially constructed in 2004 to serve as a production facility for Bigfoot Entertainment and Bigfoot Films. The company also acquired the franchises for Fashion TV (FTV) in Singapore and Philippines.

The company's facilities was expanded in November 2008 after Bigfoot negotiated a 25-year lease, marking Bigfoot Studios as the first international movie studio in the country. It consists of the six sound stages, an underwater filming tank, editing suites, sound mixing, and Foley studios.

Bigfoot also founded the International Academy of Film and Television (IAFT) as an international film school providing aspiring filmmakers with a competitive education under the mentorship of industry professionals. IAFT is located in Mactan with offices in Los Angeles. In April 2009, Bigfoot Entertainment, through their subsidiary Bigfoot Films, made its first offering to Chinese movie audiences with the release of Hui Lu in over 700 theaters across China. The film was shot on location in Hong Kong, and underwent post-production at the Bigfoot Studios in Mactan, in Cebu, Philippines.

In April 2010, Bigfoot Entertainment launched Hong Kong based 24/7 fashion network the "Fashion One."

Bigfoot Entertainment also owns the Majestic Crest Theatre in Westwood, Los Angeles, a building that, in 2008, was designated as an Historic-Cultural Monument by the City of Los Angeles. They purchased the facility in October 2010, as a venue in which to screen mainstream independent releases and to showcase their own films.

In September 2010, it was announced that Bigfoot was acquiring an interest in the Miami Film School in Hollywood, Florida, and the Palm Beach Film School in West Palm Beach, Florida.

In November 2010, Bigfoot acquired Ascendent Pictures and formed Bigfoot Ascendant Distribution as a theatrical and home entertainment division to offer theatrical, home video, and video on demand distribution, as well as foreign sales representation and domestic television sales representation.

== Facilities ==
The company's main production facilities are located on the island of Mactan, in Cebu, Philippines, with its Asia-Pacific headquarters located in Hong Kong, China.

Its facilities also include the Underwater Studio, an underwater film production unit, equipped with its own insert tank, film gear with under water housing, marine platform, crew and on-site construction facilities for building and rigging underwater sets.

Bigfoot also operates Cleverlearn, an educational division to provide web-based English language instruction and test preparation. After having secured licensing agreements with television's The Apprentice and Baywatch in 2006, Cleverlearn launched Movielearn, which uses DVDs of the two series to teach conversational and colloquial English not normally found in the classroom.

== Community Outreach ==
Bigfoot Entertainment founded the Bigfoot Asia Pacific Foundation (BAPF) as a non-profit organization to provide IT education to underprivileged youth through technological grants and teacher training. Currently, 33 schools have received funding and training from the foundation, and 22 Bigfoot Learning Centers have been established at public high schools in the Visayas, Philippines, with plans for further expansion.

In 2004, the Bigfoot Asia Pacific Foundation was selected as the Mayor's Special Awardee at the 67th Cebu City Charter Day Celebration in recognition of its continuing work with the city's schools, and in 2005, Bigfoot Global Solutions received a special citation by the Cebu Chamber of Commerce and Industry.

== Filmography ==
=== Projects produced ===
Features

- The Dogwalker (2001)
- 3 Needles (2005)
- The Curiosity of Chance (2006)
- Falling for Grace (2006)
- Shanghai Kiss (2007)
- Hui lu (2007)
- Midnight Movie (2008)
- Within (2009 film)|Within (2009)
- Irreversi (2010)
- Midnight Movie: the Killer Cut (2010)
- The Girl With No Number (2011)
- Deep Gold (2011)

Documentaries

- USS Cooper: Return to Ormoc Bay (2006)
- 9000 Needles (2011)

Television

- Nautical Angels (2005)
- Fashion TV Asia (2006)
- FTV Model Awards (2006)
- Hollywood Boot Camp (2007)
- Blue Lagoon (2010)
- Screen Test (2011)
- Diving Asia (2011)
- Underwater Action (2011)
- Model Yoga (2011)
- Model Workout (2011)
- Eco Fashion (2012)
- Corsets to Catwalk (2012)
- Front Row (2012)
- Fashion Frontline (2012)
- Fashion One Correspondent Search London (2013)
- Design Genius (2013)

Educational

- New Concept Mandarin Chinese (2009)
- Cleverlearn ESL Video Series (2009)
- The Filmmaking Series: Directing (2010)
- The Film Making Series: Screenwriting (2010)
- The Film Making Series: First Steps To Cinematography (2010)
