= Michael Gleissner =

German actor and film producer

- Born: Michael J. G. Gleissner; 1969 (age 56–57); Regensburg, Germany
- Other names: Mick Gleissner; Mickmeister; Ken Arden
- Citizenship: Philippines
- Occupations: Entrepreneur film producer actor film director

Michael J. G. Gleissner (born 1969 in Regensburg, Germany) is an entrepreneur, film producer, director, screenwriter, and actor.

== Career ==
=== Germany/USA ===
In 1989 Gleissner launched his first e-commerce company Telebuch (Tele Book) in Regensburg, co-founded with Christian Jagodzinski. In 1996 he served as managing director of the ABC Book Service office in Florida. In 1998, Telebuch and its subsidiary ABC Book Service GmbH were acquired by Amazon.com, after which Gleissner served two years as vice president of their US Operations. Gleissner also started the hosting company "WWW-Service GmbH" in Germany which was later acquired by Verio (later NTT).

=== Asia ===
In 2001, Gleissner moved several of his companies to Asia among them Bigfoot Communications and Cleverlearn Inc. In 2002, he began Bigfoot Entertainment in Cebu, Philippines to finance and develop video productions for various markets. In 2004, he also founded the International Academy of Film and Television in Cebu to constructively develop the local talent pool and facilities that support his operations. He applied for Philippine citizenship in 2006.

Gleissner currently claims to be a property developer in Southeast Asia and the United States along with developing entertainment projects under the Bigfoot Group of companies.

== Filmography ==
Gleissner's credits include executive producer, actor, and photographer on numerous films and video productions. Irreversi marked Gleissner's directorial debut, produced in both English and Mandarin simultaneously filming two versions with separate casts.

=== Producer ===
- The Dogwalker (2001)
- Nautical Angels (2005) (TV)
- 3 Needles (2005)
- Fashion TV Asia (2006)
- USS Cooper: Return to Ormoc Bay (2006)
- Falling For Grace (2006)
- The Curiosity of Chance (2006)
- Hui lu (2007) (and as director and screenwriter)
- Shanghai Kiss (2007)
- Hollywood Boot Camp (2007)
- You Me and Captain Longbridge (2008)
- Bigfoot TV (2008) (TV)
- Midnight Movie (2008)
- Within (2009)
- Fashion One (2010) (TV)
- Irreversi (2010) (and as director and screenwriter)
- Midnight Movie: the Killer Cut (2010)
- Model Yoga (2011) (TV)
- Model Workout (2011) (TV)
- Underwater Action (2011) (TV) (and as photographer)
- Deep Gold (2011) (and as director and screenwriter)
- The Girl With No Number (2011) (and as director)

=== Actor ===
- The Curiosity of Chance (2006) as Sasha
- Fashion TV Asia (2006) (as himself)
- Hui lu (2007) as Charlie
- Shanghai Kiss (2007) as Frank
- Midnight Movie (2008) as Chief
- Within (2009) as Paul
- Irreversi (2010) as Charlie
- Deep Gold (2011) as Benny Simpson
- The Girl With No Number (2011) as Bergmann (as well as director)
