= Midnight Movie (film) =

- Directed by: Jack Messitt
- Screenplay by: Jack Messitt; Mark Garbett
- Story by: Sean Hood
- Produced by: Kacy Andrews; Liam Finn; Jacques Thelemaque
- Starring: Rebekah Brandes; Daniel Bonjour; Greg Cirulnick; Mandell Maughan; Stan Ellsworth
- Cinematography: Ruben F. Russ; Clyde Smith
- Edited by: Kristoffer Villarino
- Music by: Penka Kouneva
- Production company: Bigfoot Entertainment
- Distributed by: Peace Arch Entertainment
- Release dates: September 27, 2008 (Chicago Horror Film Festival); October 24, 2008 (United States)
- Running time: 82 minutes
- Country: United States
- Language: English
- Budget: $1,000,000

Midnight Movie is a 2008 American slasher film directed by Jack Messitt, who also co-wrote the film, and produced by Kacy Andrews.

== Plot ==
Forty years after directing and starring in a slasher movie, entitled The Dark Beneath, centred on a group of friends being killed by a masked killer, Ted Radford suffers a mental breakdown and is admitted to a psychiatric ward. In an attempt to cure Radford, his doctor shows him the movie. When another doctor, Dr Wayne, arrives at the ward the following morning, he discovers evidence of a mass slaughter, however no bodies are to be found.

Five years later, a local theater is showing The Dark Beneath for the first time since the murders. The theater's staff, Bridget, Rachael, and Kenny welcome a small group of customers, including a biker couple, Harley and Babe, Dr. Wayne and Detective Barrons, who both believe Radford will appear, and Bridget's boyfriend Josh, who is with his friend Mario, Mario's girlfriend Samantha and their friend Sully. Bridget's younger brother Timmy also arrives, but is sent home due to his age. As the movie is about to begin, Josh convinces Bridget to allow Kenny to be in charge so she can watch the movie with him.

However, after a while Bridget becomes unsettled by the movie and enters the lobby, where it is revealed she was abused by her father as a child. Meanwhile, Kenny enters the basement to retrieve stock, but is murdered by the same killer from the film. His death is shown to the watchers in the theater, however they believe it is part of the film. Then Josh convinces Bridget to re-enter the theater, while Sully goes to use the restroom. However, while returning he is attacked and murdered. Bridget, Josh, Mario and Samantha think of it as an elaborate prank by Sully, but Rachael too is stabbed to death for all to see, prompting everyone to investigate. The detective reveals himself to the rest of the group, who realize the deaths are real. The group try to get help, but find their phones do not have a signal and the theater's phone is dead. They also discover Timmy, who had snuck back in to watch the movie. Suddenly, Radford appears and slashes Dr. Wayne's throat. The detective shoots Radford, but there is little effect as Dr. Wayne is soon seen being dragged into a basement on the screen.

Timmy tells the group he entered through the upstairs window, and so the group decide to try and escape. However, while doing so the window slams shut on Samantha's fingers, trapping her and forcing the others to flee. The Detective attempts to save Samantha, however Radford stabs both to death. Regrouping downstairs, the survivors find a police officer outside the entrance, however Radford makes the group invisible, and the police officer soon leaves. Desperate, the group resort to trying to break the projector, and thus stop the film. Harley breaks the projector just in time to save Josh who is attacked by Radford. The projector quickly repairs itself, and Radford chases the group. Harley, Babe and Timmy hide in a closet but the killer breaks through the door and stabs Harley while the others get away.

Bridget, Josh and Mario make their way back to the theater where they witness Babe being murdered on the screen. Mario ditches his friends, but is eventually killed by Radford. Josh also falls victim to Radford, while Bridget finds Timmy. Bridget realizes that in order to defeat the killer they have to get rid of their fear. Together, the pair concentrate on not being afraid and Radford is unable to kill them. Suddenly, Bridget finds herself in the movie, in a creepy basement. She finds everyone Radford has killed tied up in cells, bleeding but alive. She finds Josh but Radford finds her, torturing her until once again she is able to ignore her fear and escape and free Timmy. They are ambushed by the killer's movie mother, but Timmy stabs her and they continue their escape, with Radford in pursuit. Bridget realises the film is ending and so sacrifices herself to remain trapped in the movie world, throwing Timmy through the screen back into the real world. The police arrive at the theater to find Timmy the only survivor.

== Cast ==
- Rebekah Brandes as Bridget
- Daniel Bonjour as Josh
- Mandell Maughan as Samantha
- Greg Cirulnick as Mario
- Melissa Steach as Babe
- Stan Ellsworth as Harley
- Justin Baric as Timmy
- Jon Briddell as Detective Doug Barrons
- Michael Swan as Doctor Dave Wayne
- Brea Grant as Rachael
- Michael Schwartz as Sully
- Shawn Ausmus as Kenny
- Arthur Roberts as Ted Radford

== Release ==
=== Home media ===
The film was released on DVD by Peace Arch Trinity on January 6, 2009. On October 13 that same year, it was released on Blu-ray by Peace Arch and Phase 4 Films, with the latter distributing the film in Canada. Phase 4 would later re-release the film as a part of its Horror 4 Pack, which included The Attic, Carver, and Outrage Born in Terror on March 1, 2011.

== Reception ==
Michael Gingold of Fangoria gave the film a positive review, writing, "there are genuine jolts to be had here, rather than simple gross-outs." Andrew Smith from Popcorn Pictures awarded the film a score of 5/10, writing, "Midnight Movie is never going to win any awards for originality and, like the majority of modern day slashers, you’ll never really have a burning desire to see it again….or remember anything about it once the next carbon copy comes along."
