= Deep Gold =

- Theatrical release poster
- Directed by: Michael Gleissner
- Written by: Michael Gleissner; Frederick Bailey
- Produced by: Elliot Tong; Les Nordhauser
- Starring: Bebe Pham; Jaymee Ong; Michael Gleissner; Laury Prudent; Kersten Hui
- Cinematography: Rick Robinson
- Edited by: Kristoffer Villarino
- Music by: Erik Godal; Jaye Muller; Ben Patton (Muller and Patton)
- Distributed by: Bigfoot Ascendant
- Release date: April 22, 2011
- Country: Philippines
- Language: English

Deep Gold is a 2011 action film directed by Michael Gleissner and produced by Bigfoot Entertainment. Filmed in and around the islands of Cebu and Palawan in the Philippines it stars Bebe Pham, Jaymee Ong and Laury Prudent.

== Synopsis ==
Amy Sanchez (Bebe Pham) is a champion free diver who breaks a crucial free diving record. Her boyfriend, Tony dela Cruz (Jack Prinya), an Air Force Pilot, mysteriously disappears along with his plane that carries gold worth millions of dollars that was to be taken to the Central Bank.

Determined to unearth the truth, she goes off to find out what has actually happened accompanied by her sister Jess Sanchez (Jaymee Ong). She moves on her adventurous journey not knowing that she herself is going to get entangled in a trap of lies that will lead her to a much more complex conspiracy.

== Cast ==
- Bebe Pham as Amy Sanchez
- Laury Prudent as Lulu
- Michael Gleissner as Benny Simpson
- Kersten Hui as Chang
- Kelsey Adams as Young Amy
- Jose Ch. Alvarez as Librarian
- Madel Amigable as Little Girl #1
- Charry Aying as Little Girl #2
- Markéta Bělonohá as Franchesca
- Leigh Carcel as Fiona Rabanes
- Grace Hutchings as Young Jess
- Amelia Jackson-Gray as Claire Simpson
- Mon Lacsamana as Henchman Fred
- Charles Lastierre as Air Traffic controller #2
- Chiqui Lastierre as Newspaper Girl
- Ian Lim as Sgt. Gabriel
- Joe Mercado as General Cordova
- Jude Moore as Frank Townsend
- Richard Magarey as Frank
- Qt del Mar as Rachel Sanchez
- Larry Mercado as Colonel Diaz
- Earl Mullen as Henchman Larry
- Jaye Muller as himself
- Jaymee Ong as Jess Sanchez
- Ben Patton as himself
- Jack Prinya as Tony dela Cruz
- Miguel Ramirez as Henchman Mike
- Lorenzo Ramos as Ignacio
- Pakawat Suphanakhan as Tony Calderon
- Allan Tercena as Henchman Allan
- Joel Torre as Ranulfo
- Senyo Torre as Mallman
- Grean Villacarios as Power Company Guy
- Thomas Watter as Hans
- Jeremiah Sird as Captain Cook

== Reception ==
Deep Gold received a majority of negative reviews.

Critic Brian Orndorf gave it "C" grade and wrote: "Not a film of intelligence or logic, but something candied to offer a few moderate thrills for audiences who prefer their action thick-fingered and cheesy, sold by a good-looking cast with little to no acting ability."
