= Irreversi =

- Theatrical poster
- Directed by: Michael Gleissner
- Written by: Michael Gleissner; Mark Jacyszyn; Scott Kurttila; Andrew Lacrosse
- Produced by: Kacy Andrews; Lisa Schahet
- Starring: Mei Melancon; Ian Bohen; Estella Warren; Kenny Doughty; Caroline Carver
- Cinematography: Jack Messitt
- Edited by: Stanley Tam; Kristoffer Villarino
- Music by: Erik Godal; Jaye Muller; Ben Patton
- Production company: Bigfoot Entertainment
- Distributed by: Bigfoot Entertainment
- Release date: 2010 (U.S.)
- Running time: 87 minutes
- Language: English
- Budget: est. $2,000,000 US

Hui lu
- Theatrical poster
- Directed by: Michael Gleissner
- Written by: Michael Gleissner; Mark Jacyszyn; Scott Kurttila; Andrew Lacrosse
- Produced by: Elliot Tong
- Starring: Margaret Wang; Hawick Lau; Sasha Hou; Hao Qin
- Cinematography: Jason Kwan
- Edited by: Kwok-Wing Leung
- Music by: Erik Godal; Jaye Muller; Ben Patton
- Production company: Bigfoot Entertainment
- Distributed by: Bigfoot Entertainment
- Release date: 2007 (Hong Kong)
- Running time: 87 minutes
- Language: Mandarin
- Budget: est. $2,000,000 US

Irreversi is a 2010 dramatic film directed by Michael Gleissner and shot in Hong Kong as the English language version of Gleissner's Mandarin-language film Hui lu, which he filmed and directed at the same time in the same locations but with an entirely different cast. The title refers to how a situation can reverse and turn against the original perpetrator.

== Production ==
Both Irreversi and Hui lu were self-financed by Gleissner, and filming of both began in Hong Kong in March 2006. The film duo marked being Gleissner's directorial debut, as well as being the first time identical films were produced simultaneously in both English and Mandarin, with the two otherwise identical versions having two separate sets of cast and crew. The only cast that was common to both films were Vietnamese supermodel Bebe Pham and Geissner himself using the pseudonym of Ken Arden. Gleissner directed both films and produced the English version. Elliot Tong produced the Chinese version, which was itself released in Hong Kong in 2007 and screened in Beijing, Shanghai, Guangzhou, Shenzhen and Chengdu in 2009.

== Synopsis ==
Adam, a young entrepreneur, has sold his technology company. The money allows him and his new wife Lynda to enjoy a life of luxury, but their marriage becomes unstable when Lynda begins to suspect that Adam's newly acquired fortune is related to the recent death of her brother.

== Cast ==
=== Irreversi ===
- Mei Melancon as Lynda
- Ian Bohen as Adam
- Estella Warren as Kat
- Kenny Doughty as David
- Michael Gleissner as Charlie (as Ken Arden)
- Caroline Carver as Terry
- Bebe Pham as Show Model
- Kersten Hui as Taxidermy Boss
- Jo Wee as Ling
- Christian Mills as Simon
- Howard Cheung as John

=== Hui lu ===
- Margaret Wang as Lynda Wei
- Hawick Lau as Adam Liu
- Sasha Hou as Kat Chen
- Hao Qin as David Du
- Michael Gleissner as Charlie (as Ken Arden)
- Susanna Fung as Terry
- Bebe Pham as Show Model
- Kersten Hui as Taxidermy Boss
- Yao Hsiao as Ling
- Elliot Tong as Simon Chu
- Philip Ng as John Wei
- Jeremiah Sird as Gao Fei

== Recognition ==
=== Awards and nominations ===
In 2008 Ireversi – Hiu lu Won the Award of Merit at the 6th Annual Accolade Competition.
