= Nimoy Theater =

Movie theatre in Los Angeles, California

Coordinates: 34°03′28″N 118°26′34″W

- The Nimoy
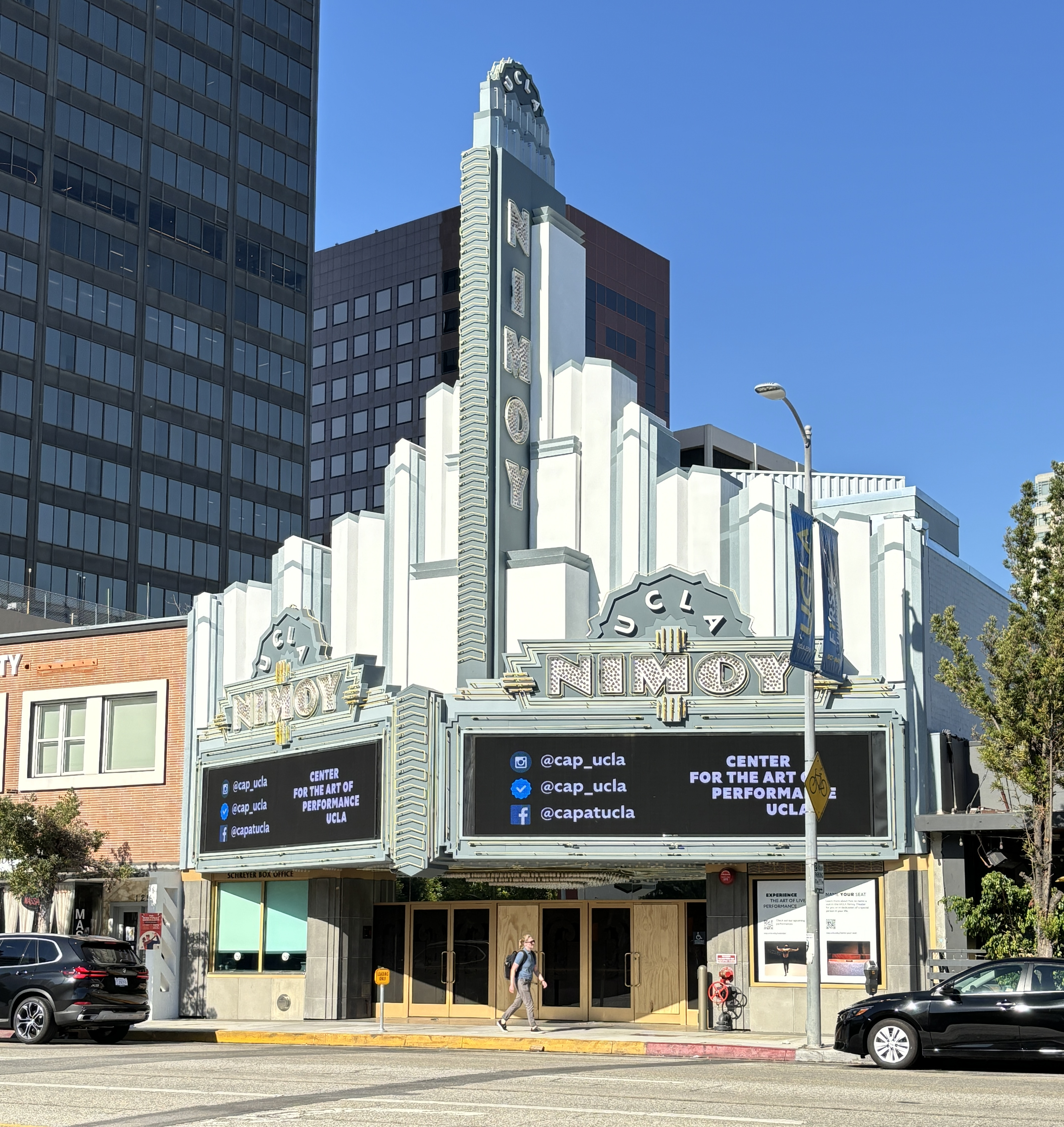
- The theater in 2024
- Interactive map of Nimoy Theater
- Former names: UCLAN; Crest Theater; The Crest; Majestic Crest Theater; Bigfoot Crest Theater
- Address: 1262 Westwood Boulevard; Los Angeles, California 90024
- Owner: UCLA
- Operator: Crest Theater Inc.
- Seating type: see website
- Capacity: 460
- Type: Movie theater
- Scoreboard: yes

Construction
- Built: 1939
- Opened: 1941
- Renovated: 1987, 2023
- Architect: Arthur Hawes
- Project manager: see website

Tenants
- Walt Disney Studios Motion Pictures (1980s-2002)

Website
- cap.ucla.edu/ucla-nimoy-theater

The Nimoy Theater, formerly known as Crest, Majestic Crest and Bigfoot Crest Theatre, is a movie theatre located in the Westwood neighborhood of Los Angeles, California. It was founded as the UCLAN in 1941, and was built for live performances but switched to a newsreel cinema during World War II. Through ownership changes, it has been known at various times as UCLAN Theatre, Crest Theatre, and Metro Theatre. The original 500-seat art deco style theater was designed by Arthur W. Hawes.

In October 2018, UCLA acquired the theatre, extensively renovated it, and reopened it in September 2023, renamed after Leonard Nimoy.

== History ==
Arthur Hawes designed the theater in an austere Moderne style for financer Frances Seymour Fonda, wife of Henry and mother of Jane and Peter, as a live performance theater. The theatre was opened in 1941 as the UCLAN.

The venue was converted to a movie theater exclusively devoted to newsreels during World War II. After the war ended, the theater featured foreign films.

=== Crest Theater ===
After being renamed the Crest Theater, feature films began screening there, including Dr. Strangelove, Rosemary's Baby, Goodbye, Columbus and Bob & Carol & Ted & Alice.

Pacific Theatres purchased the Crest in 1985. Late in the 1980s, Disney purchased a controlling stake in one of Pacific's chains that held El Capitan Theatre and the Crest.

Disney's Buena Vista Theaters and Pacific began renovating the Crest in 1987, with its motif changed to a Hollywood fantasy-land. Joseph Musil was engaged to overhaul the theater's interior. The first part of the renovation was upgrading its film and sound systems, which was done before the 1987 opening of Three Men and a Baby. The next phase was to re-theme the theater in an Art Deco motif while rehabilitating the lobby, auditorium, restrooms and seats. This was finished by the 1988 premiere of Big Business. Disney ended its partnership in the Crest in 2002.

Eventually Pacific sold the theater to independent operator Robert Bucksbaum in 2003, who then renamed it the Majestic Crest Theater after the 2001 film The Majestic. In 2008, it was designated Historic Landmark No. 919 by the city of Los Angeles, California.

In September 2010, the theater was purchased by Bigfoot Entertainment theatre chain for around $4 million. The renamed Bigfoot Crest Theater was acquired to show films produced or bought by Bigfoot. It was managed by the Carmike Bigfoot's scheduling was improved by Carmike with a number of higher profile films, niche showings, midnight horror movies, Asian Film Nights and an annual film festival. The Crest hosted the Singafest Asian Film Festival until late October 2011 after which the theater was closed for remodeling. Carmike ended their management of the theater at that time. Bigfoot placed the building up for sale by December 2011. The theatre closed again in October 2012 while still for sale.

In August 2013, after being closed about 19 months, the theatre had reopened under new management as the Crest with a series of ballet and opera screenings. The theatre announced their intention to program more movies and events in the future. For example, the last Friday of the month the theatre has a surfing series showing surfing movies.

=== Nimoy Theater ===
In October 2018, with support from Susan Nimoy and an anonymous donor, UCLA’s Center for the Art of Performance and The School of Arts & Architecture acquired the theatre. Following an extensive renovation, it was reopened as a performance space in September 2023 and renamed after Leonard Nimoy.
