= Luxe.tv =

Television channel

Your Luxury Channel
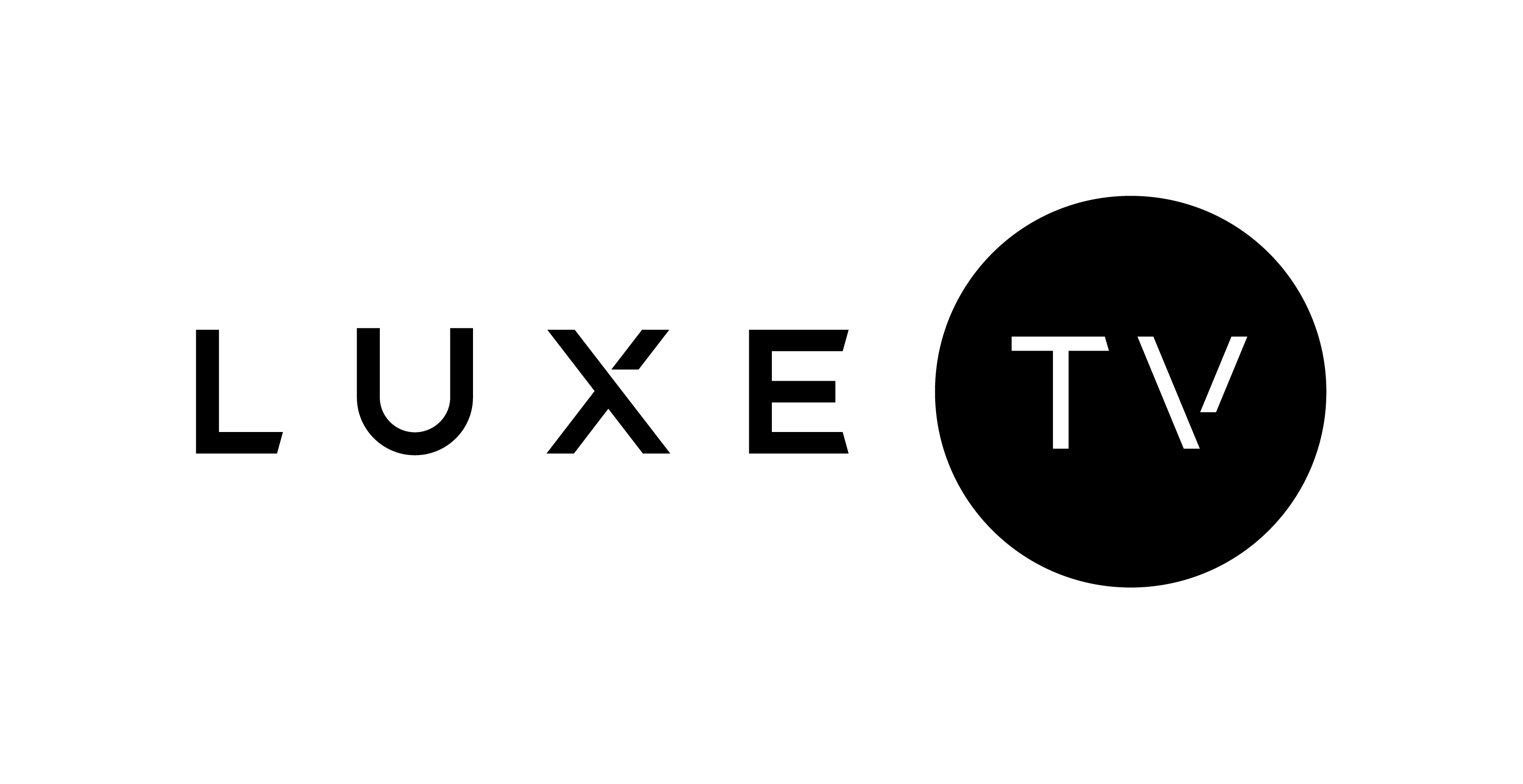
- LUXE.TV's New Visual Identity
- Country: Luxembourg
- Broadcast area: Worldwide
- Headquarters: Luxembourg

Programming
- Languages: English, French, Spanish, Italian, Russian, German
- Picture format: 1080i (HDTV)

Ownership
- Owner: Opuntia S.A.

History
- Launched: 2006/06/23

Links
- Website: https://luxe.tv/

LUXE.TV is a worldwide TV network broadcasting content related to fashion and luxury goods. The channel is based in Luxembourg and broadcast in over 65 countries worldwide.

== History ==
LUXE TV was started by Jean Stock and his son Jean-Baptiste in June 2006. Jean Stock is known in the media industry as co-founder of French leading private channel M6, his early work with RTL Radio and RTL Télé Luxembourg, his position as general secretary of the European Broadcasting Union and his time as chairman and CEO of international French-speaking channel TV5MONDE. LUXE TV HD was one of the first HD channels in Europe, Middle East and Asia.

Sergey Pugachyov's OPK Luxadvor S.A. holding company acquired a 72% controlling stake in the channel from its founders in April 2009. The remainder of the company was held by European media industry personalities including Jean Stock and Charles Ruppert. On 24 September 2010, Jean Stock resigned as president of DVL.TV, while remaining as a member of the board of directors.

In early August 2010, twenty-four of the thirty-seven employees of the TV station had been fired and all production activities had been stopped. OGBL, the Luxembourg Confederation of Independent Trade Unions, was told that the business model didn't work out.

In mid-October 2010, Jean Stock asked the Luxembourg Commercial Court to declare DVL.TV S.A. bankrupt after rejecting a proposed rescheduling of €2.6 million of a €3.25 million loan owed to him by DVL.TV following the takeover by Pugachyov,

On 29 October 2010, Jean Stock was chosen by the Luxembourg Insolvency Administrator in charge of the winding-up process of DVL.TV, as the exclusive party to become the new owner of the network, after submitting the highest bid.

Opuntia S.A. soon put in place a new management structure, with Paul-René Heinerscheid as managing director and attracted a major outside investor. The company turned LUXE TV into a Pay-TV channel, and concluded major new distribution agreements in Europe and Asia. It moved its facilities from the city of Luxembourg to a new location outside in Bascharage in late June 2011.

It is commercially represented by Thema TV in Asia and Russia, and by Lagardère Active in several European markets.

As of July 2011, Luxe.TV is available in 107 countries in the world. 92 million homes have a direct access to the channel (6 million in France, 1.8 million in South Korea and 1.3 million in Portugal). It is distributed by fiber optics, many cable operators in Europe, Middle East and Asia, DTTV channel 7 in Luxembourg and by satellite on Eutelsat's EB-9A (Ku-band), on Arabsat Badr-6 (Ku-band), and on AsiaSat 5 (C-band).

== Content and programming ==
The content mainly consists out of three kinds of formats: documentaries, magazines and news programmes. Although other content is shown, LUXE TV mainly covers six sectors of the "luxury" and lifestyle market:

- Real Estate & Home Design
- Sports & Leisure
- Hotels & Gastronomy
- Beauty & Fashion
- Cars & Yachting
- Jewellery & Watches

LUXE TV produces and distributes all its programmes in high definition (HD) with their own production teams or through external production companies. Some Pay TV operators may choose to distribute the channel in standard-definition.

From Monday to Thursday, the Luxe.Today section broadcasts news on the luxury world and lifestyle. These programmes are produced with the cooperation of AFP. From Friday to Sunday the Luxe.Week section proposes a selection of the best of the previous week's programming.

Some life-style reports are broadcast live, such as the wedding of Prince William and Catherine Middleton and the wedding of Albert II, Prince of Monaco, and Charlene Wittstock. Luxe.TV was the only television channel to present these two ceremonies live in HD in Asia via Asiasat satellite and in the Middle East via Badr5 satellite.

== Reach ==
The programs, all produced in high definition and are transmitted in both SD and HD formats. The channel broadcasts in six languages: English, French, German, Italian, Spanish and Russian with further languages planned in the future.

LUXE TV can be received free-to-air by satellite in Europe over the satellites Astra and Hotbird, in the Middle East over Arabsat, in Asia over AsiaSat-2 and Eutelsat W5 and in Russia over the satellite ABS1. Asia-Pacific Available On Taiwan CHT MOD Ch 263 and Other Selected Countries.
