= FashionTV =

International fashion and lifestyle television channel

- Country: France
- Broadcast area: Worldwide
- Headquarters: London; Paris; Vienna

Programming
- Language: English
- Picture format: 16:9 (576i, SDTV); 1080i (HDTV); 2160p (4K UHD)

Ownership
- Owner: Michel Adam Lisowski

History
- Launched: April 1997

Links
- Website: www.fashiontv.com

FashionTV is an international fashion and lifestyle broadcasting channel.

== Australia ==
In Australia, the channel was available on the Foxtel Digital Subscription Television and Austar channel 123, and the MidnightHot program was sometimes seen on channel 955. As of February 26, 2012, Foxtel and Austar no longer broadcast FashionTV channel, however, it will still be offered by IPTV service FetchTV. It was originally reported that dropping the channel was due to it being liquidated, but the original franchise (FTV Oceania Pty. Ltd) was liquidated in July 2011 and FashionTV International took back control of all the activities in Australia then, so the reason the channel was dropped from Foxtel and Austar is unknown. On August 6th, 2024, the channel relaunched on Foxtel.

== Asia ==
In Asia, the channel is seen live via satellite, free-to-air on Apstar 7. It is broadcast all over Asian countries such as Nepal, Sri Lanka, Vietnam, Singapore, Hong Kong, Japan, Indonesia, Malaysia, Mongolia, South Korea, and Taiwan. In Hong Kong, the channel is available on all direct broadcast satellite service providers and all cable television operators. It is available in Bangladesh via the Bongo video-on-demand service since June 2022.

== Brazil ==
Released on August 6, 2007, Fashion TV Brasil by Turner Broadcasting, in 2011 the company terminated the contract with its owner, giving rise to Glitz. The company Box Brazil TV relaunched the channel in September 201 which was made available in all major TV operators: Oi, Vivo, Claro, Sky, and NEOTV Associated Operators.

== India ==
In 2007, FTV was suspended from broadcasting in India for two months for showing scantily-clad models on its show Midnight Hot. The channel was suspended again in 2010 for 10 days for airing a show containing topless models associated with the Bella Club TV show.

FTV India, owned by Modi Entertainment Networks (MEN) - a joint venture between Lalit Modi and Walt Disney, had signed an agreement with Programmgesellschaft mbH, the parent company of the FTV brand in August 2001 for broadcast rights in India for franchising FTV Bars, the channel's owned nightclubs. FTV India was to pay a minimum annual guarantee of $720,000 per annum and the channel would only be available on pay television to Indian viewers. However, in 2003, FTV India went free-to-air, triggering the dispute over revenue sharing and outstanding payments. On 24 May 2011, the Delhi High Court restrained FTV from terminating the agreement. This injunction was later removed by an arbitral tribunal. On 4 January 2012, the case was heard by the Supreme Court of India. The channel was banned in 2007 in Bhutan, which was described by local academic Karma Ura of the Center of Bhutan Studios as being the antithesis of Buddhism.

== New Zealand ==
In New Zealand, FashionTV was available on Freeview (New Zealand) DTT channel 30. The channel was previously on Sky Network Television channel 066. In November 2004, FashionTV was dropped from Sky Network Television due to a dispute over FashionTV wanting subscriber revenue. On April 18, 2005, this dispute was settled by relaunching the channel. On May 11, 2011, FashionTV was once again dropped from Sky.

== Other regions ==
=== South Africa ===
Fashion TV signed an initial five-year contract with DStv to carry the channel in October 2000.

== Other FashionTV channels ==
=== FashionTV UHD ===
FashionTV UHD
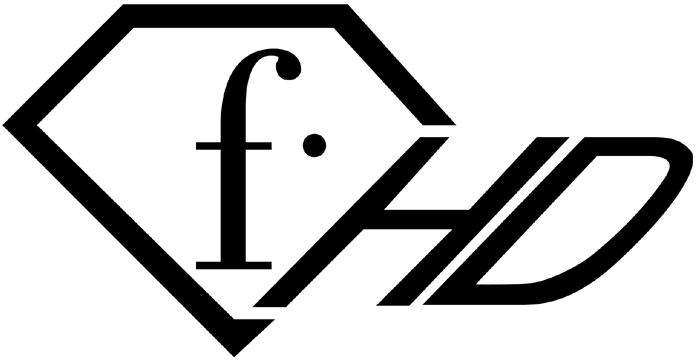
- Country: France

Programming
- Language: English
- Picture format: 1080i (HDTV); 2160p (UHDTV)

History
- Launched: September 2015

Links
- Website: www.fashiontv.com

In September 2015, FashionTV launched a new UHD 4K channel. It can be received in Europe (Hot Bird at 13°E), South East Asia, Oceania, North America, Middle East and Africa.

== See also ==
- World Fashion Channel
- Luxe.tv
