= List of Sanrio characters =

Various Sanrio characters, from left to right, top to bottom: Bad Badtz-Maru, My Melody, Cinnamoroll, Charmmy Kitty, Hello Kitty, Usahana, Shinkansen, Keroppi, Pochacco, Little Twin Stars, Pompompurin, Corocorokuririn, and Minna no Tabo

This is a list of characters from Sanrio, a Japanese company specialized in creating kawaii (cute) characters. Sanrio sells and licenses products branded with these characters and has created over 450 characters. Their most successful and best known character, Hello Kitty, was created in 1974. Most Sanrio characters are anthropomorphized animals, while a few are humans or anthropomorphized objects.

Sanrio began creating characters to increase sales of its merchandise. Typical merchandise featuring the characters include clothing, accessories, toys and stationery. The characters subsequently appeared in media such as books, animation and video games. Beginning with Jewelpet in 2008, Sanrio started collaborating with Sega Toys in creating characters intended to become media franchises. Notable designers of Sanrio characters include Yuko Shimizu, original designer of Hello Kitty, Yuko Yamaguchi, lead designer for most of Hello Kitty's history and Miyuki Okumura, original designer of Cinnamoroll.

Sanrio hosts two theme parks in Japan featuring their characters: Sanrio Puroland in Tama, Tokyo, and Harmonyland in Hiji, Ōita, Kyūshū. Since 1986, Sanrio has held the annual Sanrio Character Ranking poll, where fans can vote on their favorite characters. It began in the Strawberry Newspaper published by Sanrio in Japan, but voting now takes place online and is open to international audiences.

Besides their own original characters listed here, Sanrio also owns the rights to the Mr. Men characters and Japanese licensing rights to the Peanuts characters such as Snoopy. The characters listed here are shown with the year in which they first debuted.

== 1970s ==
=== Coro Chan (1973) ===
Coro Chan (コロちゃん, Korochan) is the first original Sanrio character. Introduced in 1973, he is portrayed as a gentle and laid-back bear. He was designed by Yuko Shimizu, who is also the original designer of Hello Kitty. According to Sanrio's backstory, Coro Chan is a cousin of Hello Kitty's bear friend Thomas. His name comes from the croquettes on his cheeks, which he might eat when he gets hungry. According to official character profiles, he lives in Windermere in England, and his birthday is November 8.

=== Hello Kitty (1974) ===
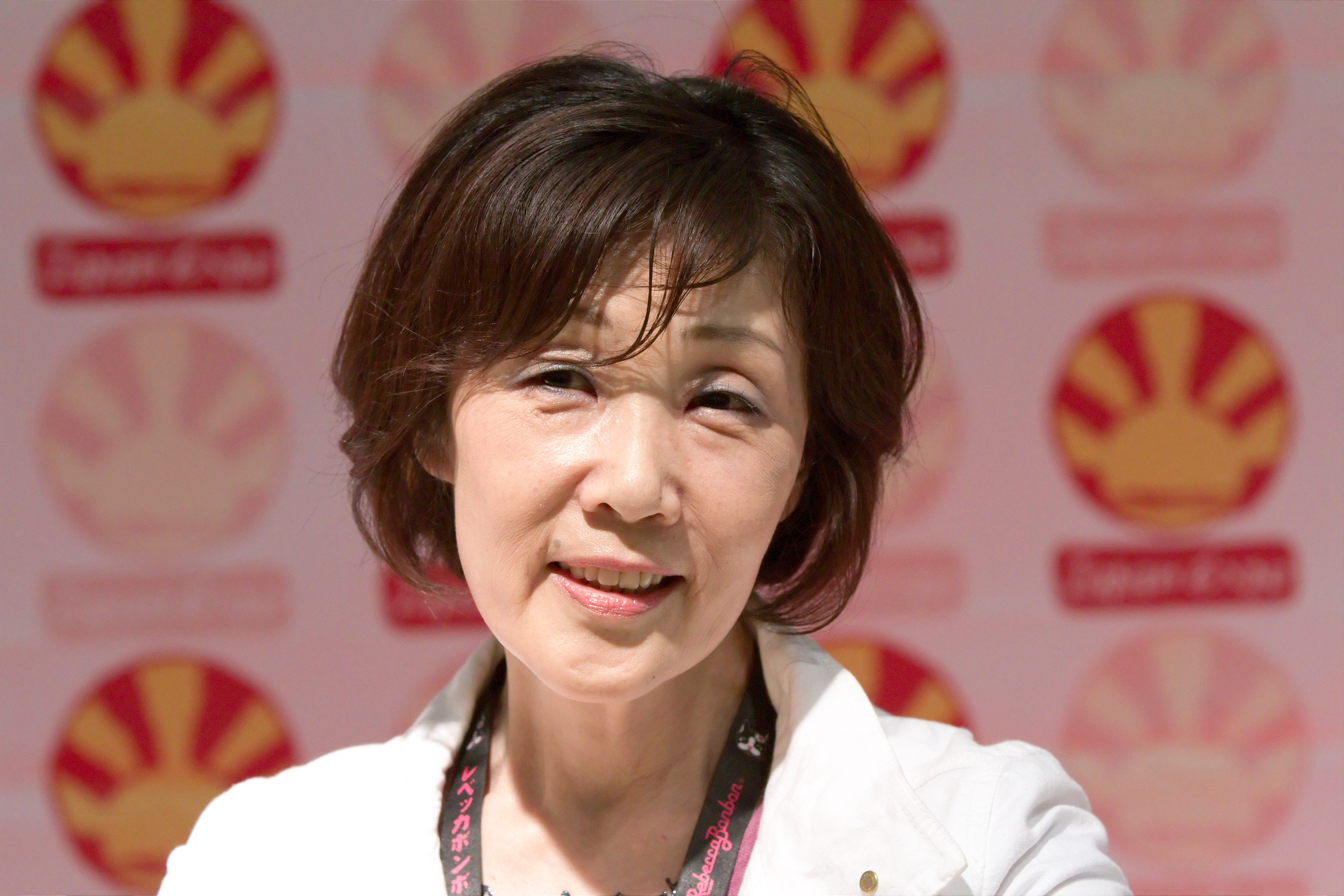
Yuko Shimizu created the original design of Hello Kitty in 1974.

Hello Kitty (ハローキティ, Harō Kiti) is the best-known of Sanrio's characters. She is depicted as a white cat with a red bow and no visible mouth. The original design for Hello Kitty was created by Yuko Shimizu in 1974. However, the lead designer in charge of creating new design themes for most of Hello Kitty's history, since 1980, has been Yuko Yamaguchi. The first Hello Kitty item, a vinyl coin purse, was introduced in 1975.

Official character profiles list Hello Kitty's full name as Kitty White (キティ・ホワイト, Kiti Howaito), born in the suburbs of London on November 1. Her height is described as five apples and her weight as three apples. She is depicted as a bright and kind-hearted girl who is good at baking cookies and likes to play the piano. Hello Kitty is portrayed with a large family including her twin sister Mimmy, who wears a yellow bow, papa George and mama Mary.

Originally Hello Kitty was only marketed towards pre-teenage girls, but beginning in the 1990s, the brand found commercial success among teenage and adult consumers as well. The brand went into decline in Japan after the 1990s, but it continued to grow in the international market. By 2010 the character was worth $5 billion a year and The New York Times called her a "global marketing phenomenon". By 2014, when Hello Kitty was 40 years old, she was worth about $8 billion a year.

UNICEF has appointed Hello Kitty children's ambassador and the Japanese government appointed her ambassador of tourism. The Hello Kitty media franchise has grown to include several animated series, video games and other media productions. A variety of products have featured the character over the years, and as of 2008, there were over 50,000 different Hello Kitty branded products.

Aside from the core Hello Kitty characters, several spinoff characters have been created: Hello Kitty's boyfriend Dear Daniel in 1999, Charmmy Kitty, Hello Kitty's pet cat, and Sugar, her pet hamster, both in 2004, and her superhero alter-ego Ichigoman in 2011.

=== Patty & Jimmy (1974) ===
Patty & Jimmy (ja:パティ&ジミー, Pati&Jimī) are two human characters originally released in 1974. Patty is a girl with braids who wears red overalls, and Jimmy is a boy with short unruly hair who wears blue overalls. According to official character profils, they are best friends who live next door to each other in Kansas City. Patty is a tomboy who loves sports, like tennis and baseball, but dislikes studying, while Jimmy is a studious bookworm who is great at chess but is clumsy and not very good at sports. They are shown in everyday settings like at school, on the couch or outside on a park bench, and engaging in activities like bug catching, riding bikes, playing instruments and doing sports.

Patty & Jimmy were designed by Hiroko Suzuki (鈴木ひろ子, Suzuki Hiroko) later known as Roko Maeda (ロコ・まえだ) who subsequently left Sanrio and went on to be an independent designer and picture book author. The character setting was based on a visit to Kansas City in the United States where Sanrio had an affiliate company. The designs were also inspired by American TV shows and the authors Joan Walsh Anglund and Richard Scarry. The character that would become Patty started out as a notebook doodle where she was seen from the back, and then came to be used unnamed in a series of designs using the slogan "love is". When the boy character was added he was originally known as "Jim" before the duos name was finalized as Patty & Jimmy.

Merchandise with the characters inspired by American school life, like book straps, lunch boxes and ring binders became popular. Picture books and a music EP with the characters were also released in the 1970s. The popularity of Patty & Jimmy was on par with that of Hello Kitty in the 1970s, but their popularity declined in the 1980s. Sanrio has since released products with Patty & Jimmy as part of retro collections.

=== Little Twin Stars (1975) ===
Little Twin Stars (ja:リトルツインスターズ, Ritoru Tsuin Sutāzu) also known as Kikilala (キキララ, kikirara) in Japan are a pair of angel-like characters. The younger brother with blue hair is Kiki (キキ, Kiki), and the older sister with pink hair is Lala (ララ, Rara). Originally designed by Yōko Matsumoto (松本庸子) who also designed My Melody. They were initially created for a 1975 Christmas promotion and their birthday is December 24, Christmas Eve. Drawing inspiration from Christmas and winter themes, early sketches had the characters wearing warm coats and winter scarves, before Matsumoto settled on stars as the motif. Because they came from the sky, she gave them white angel style clothes. In their first publication the characters were unnamed, and their names originate from a survey in the Strawberry Newspaper where readers could send in their suggestions.

Early Little Twin Stars branded products, like those for other similar Sanrio characters of the era, were items marketed to young girls, like stationery and accessories. In the late 70s, Sanrio also began publishing picture books with Kiki and Lala, illustrated by Matsumoto and others. Since the inception of the Little Twin Stars, new designs have continually been created, following trends of the times. In their original designs, Kiki's hair was brown and Lala's was yellow. In the 80s, the designs became more pastel colored, and their hair colors settled into being predominantly blue and pink. In the 90s, their faces were modernized, and designs were rendered in 3D CGI, and in the 00s there was a retro return to the styles of the 70s and 80s.

In 2015, EVA Air introduced a special livery Boeing 777-300ER, "Shining Stars", dedicated to the characters. The plane is mainly used on routes from Taipei to Houston and Singapore.

Little Twin Stars have previously been included in video games with other Sanrio characters, but in 2018, the first mobile game app featuring them exclusively was released for iOS and Android. Titled Kiki & Lala's Twinkle Puzzle (キキ&ララのトゥインクルパズル), it is a tile matching puzzle game developed by Imagineer. It incorporates illustrations from a 70s picture book with the origin story of the characters.

=== My Melody (1975) ===
My Melody (ja:マイメロディ, Mai Merodī) is a white rabbit character. She is depicted as always wearing a bright red or pink hood that covers her ears. According to official character profiles, her birthday is January 18 and she lives in the forest of Mariland with friends like My Sweet Piano (a sheep), and Flat (a mouse). When My Melody debuted, she was portrayed as Little Red Riding Hood.

My Melody can be found on children's toys and merchandise (from jewelry to household items). My Melody was first released in 1975, and the first related merchandise was released at the end of that year.

At first, she mainly was marketed toward young girls, but like Hello Kitty, her popularity has increased among women and men of all ages, especially in Asia.

Beginning in 1989, My Melody has been regularly voiced by Rei Sakuma in Japan beginning with the 1989 anime short My Melody no Akazukin.

In the late 1980s, My Melody's popularity waned, and the only items produced were stationery and candy. According to a reader survey published in the Strawberry Newspaper in 1996, My Melody came out amongst some of Sanrio's most popular characters, and as a result, due to popular demand, standard merchandise started re-appearing beginning in February 1997 featuring the original red hood. Items with the pink hood were re-released in 1999; as of 2000, there were items released with multiple color hoods.

On April 3, 2005, an anime series based on My Melody and her friends and produced by Studio Comet started to air on TV Osaka and TV Tokyo television stations, called Onegai My Melody (おねがいマイメロディ), which aired from 2005 to 2008. This anime also spawned a video game for the Nintendo DS titled Onegai My Melody: Yume no Kuni no Daibouken (おねがいマイメロディ～夢の国の大冒険～). The game relies heavily on a feature of the Nintendo DS console which requires the player to blow air into the microphone of the unit. The player guides My Melody through timed levels by jumping and using her umbrella to float around and avoid enemies. The game also features unlockable content as well, such as music, images, and mini-games. In 2007, a second game was released for the Nintendo DS, titled My Melody Angel Book ~Denshitechou & Enjoy Game~ (マイメロディエンジェルブック～電子手帳&エンジョイゲーム～). The game's primary function is as a day planner designed for young girls to keep track of appointments, class schedules, and mini diary entries.

My Melody also appears in the Sanrio Digital and Dream Cortex series, The Adventures of Hello Kitty & Friends. She, however, is mouthless there, and her rival Kuromi does not make an appearance.

On March 1, 2008, Mattel released a Barbie doll named "My Melody". The My Melody Barbie doll featured a Barbie doll inspired by the My Melody character, with the character's face included in different parts of the doll's fashion and accessories. In an homage to the character's rabbit ears, the doll's hair is styled in pigtails. My Melody has also been turned into a Pullip doll with two versions: one originally released in 2008, and the latest one in 2016.

On March 26, 2008, a Japanese music compilation album titled I Love 30 – My Melody from Tearbridge Records was released with My Melody wearing the original red hood drawn in various artwork styles by Groovisions. Rei Sakuma has been the regular voice of My Melody in Japan since 1989.

In 2010, The New York Times said that My Melody was "moderately successful" in terms popularity but showed no signs of reaching the global popularity of Hello Kitty. My Melody was number one in the Sanrio Character Rankings in 2010 and 2011. In 2019 she was Sanrio's second most profitable character, after Hello Kitty.

In 2014, Sanrio celebrated the character's 40th anniversary by creating a special line of merchandise where she is given a different hood where her ears are dropped down and wears either a bonnet or a flower pin and sometimes depicted with eyelashes. Sanrio Puroland honored the 40th anniversary of the character by creating an indoor ride called "My Melody Drive" where visitors are visiting Mariland and encounter My Melody and her friends including Kuromi who attempts to ruin her day.

My Melody is also seen in collaboration merchandise with other non-Sanrio series, such as one with Sailor Moon in 2017.

In 2019, My Melody became a radio DJ on Tokyo FM with a show called My Melo Therapy (マイメロセラピー), where she answers questions from listeners and offers advice. A book with advice from the show was released in 2022.

In the 2020 web series Hello Kitty and Friends: Supercute Adventures, My Melody is one of the main characters where she is voiced by Michelle Marie.

In 2025, she was given a catchphrase "Melly-melly" for the Western markets beginning with a video celebrating the character's 50th anniversary and a music video called "My Melody Birthday Song".

A stop-motion Netflix anime series My Melody & Kuromi, featuring both her and her rival Kuromi, was released worldwide on July 24, 2025, to celebrate the character's 50th anniversary.

Spinoff characters from My Melody include My Sweet Piano, one of her closest companions, Kuromi, her friend and rival, and Little Forest Fellow, her cousin.

=== The Strawberry King (1975) ===
The Strawberry King (ja:いちごの王さま, Ichigo no ōsama) is a humanoid character with a large red strawberry for a head. He was created as an alter-ego of Sanrio founder Shintaro Tsuji, and has the same birthday as him, December 7. Official character bios describe him as "the king of the beautiful and peaceful Strawberry Kingdom" who "spends his days bringing messages of peace and friendship to all". The Strawberry King rarely appears on merchandise, but every month, a message from the Strawberry King (written by Tsuji) has been published in Sanrio's Strawberry Newspaper, similarly to an editorial. A book with a collection of some of these messages was published in 2007. A Sanrio museum named after the character, Yamanashi Strawberry King Museum, opened in 2026.

=== Big Challenges (1978) ===
Big Challenges (ビッグチャレンジ, Biggu Charenji) is a green crocodile, described by Sanrio as a "unique crocodile-kun" who "puts on an innocent face, but you can see that he's laughing, right?" In 2018, the character came to the attention of English language Twitter after being featured in the Have You Heard About This Boy fanzine. Big Challenges makes an appearance in the 2023 video game Hello Kitty Island Adventure, his first appearance in Sanrio media since his creation in 1978. Writing about the game, Oricon News described Big Challenges as a "rare" and seldom heard of character. Hyperallergic magazine hypothesized that the character may have had limited marketing reach due to its resemblance to the logo of fashion brand Lacoste. In Island Adventure, Big Challenges only says one word, "gao", which translates to "roar" in Japanese.

=== Button Nose (1978) ===
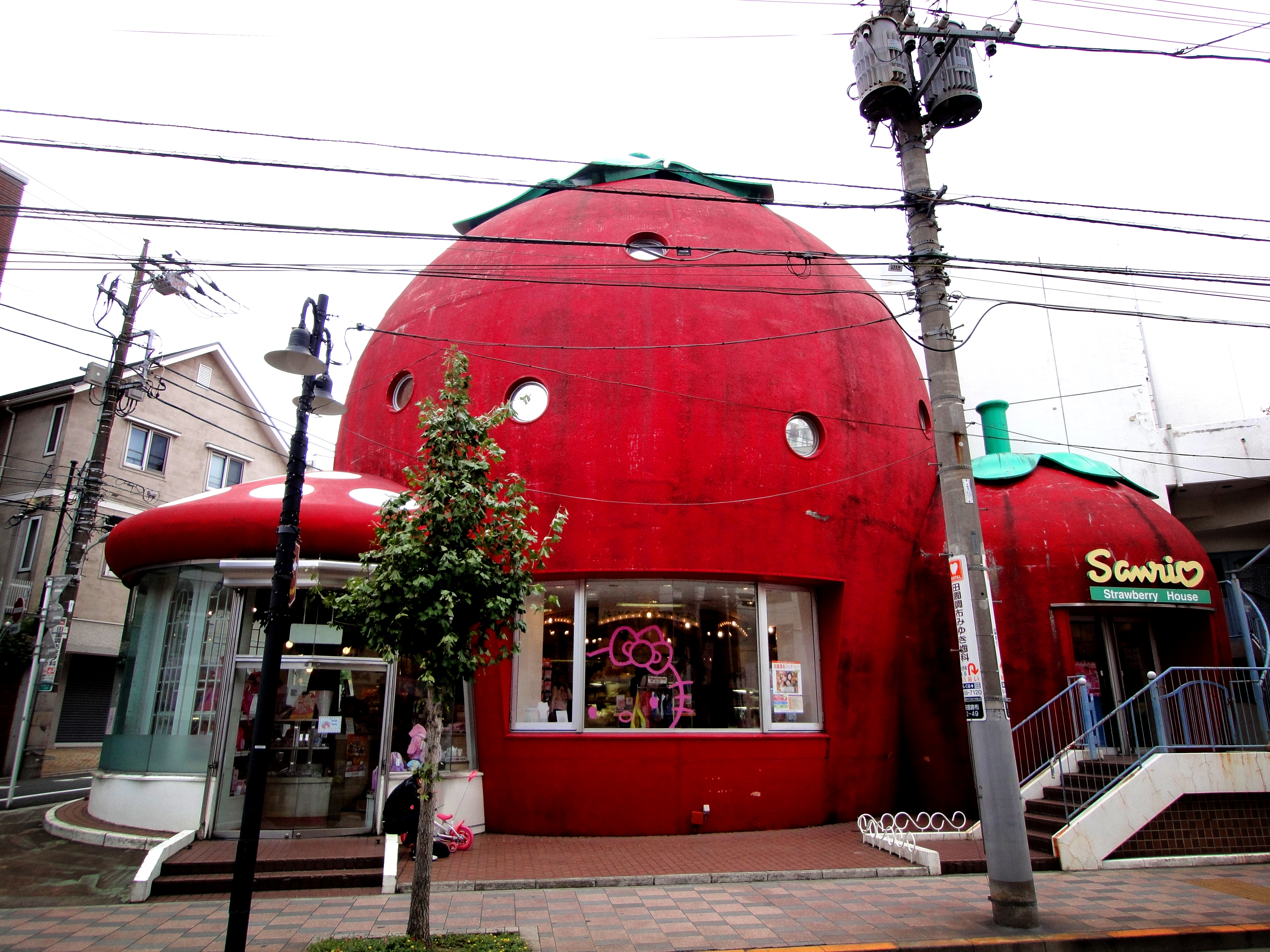
Sanrio's Strawberry House store was based on the fictional home of Button Nose.

Button Nose (ja:ボタンノーズ, Botan nōzu) is a human character. She is the protagonist of Button Nose, the first anime television series produced by Sanrio. Button Nose is portrayed as a sweet and lively girl who makes strawberry jam and likes cookies. According to official character profiles, her birthday is January 5, and her real name is Trish, but she is called Button Nose because her nose is small and round. The original design for Button Nose was created by Masayo Hirose (広瀬昌代), and the character was introduced in 1978.

In 1983, Sanrio built the Strawberry House (ja:いちごのお家) store in Tokyo. The store is shaped like a strawberry and was based on the fictional home of Button Nose. It was originally planned to be in place for a limited time, but due to positive customer response, the store remained in operation until 2011. The anime series Button Nose, which began in 1985, was the first television anime series produced by Sanrio. The series places Button Nose in a fairy tale and science fiction setting, where she turns out to be descended from royalty.

=== Tuxedo Sam (1979) ===
Tuxedo Sam (ja:タキシードサム, Takishīdosamu) is a plump blue penguin character who is drawn wearing a bow-tie and a sailor hat. According to official character profiles, he was born on May 12 in Antarctica. Characters and items based on Tuxedo Sam were included in the Sanrio edition of Tamagotchi Meets from 2019 as well as the Sanrio expansion for the Tamagotchi Smart from 2022. In 1982, there were over 150 Tuxedo Sam items available, and he was the 4th most popular Sanrio character, after Hello Kitty, Little Twin Stars, and My Melody. In 2010, The New York Times described Tuxedo Sam as "moderately successful" in terms of popularity but showing no signs of reaching the global popularity of Hello Kitty.

== 1980s ==
=== My Sweet Piano (1980) ===
My Sweet Piano (マイスウィートピアノ, Mai Sūīto Piano) is a spinoff character from My Melody. She is depicted as a pink female sheep who is gentle and pampered and loves to talk and hang out with My Melody. She was introduced in 1980 as a friend of My Melody. She was originally known as "Hitsuji-san", which roughly translates to "Miss Sheep". Sanrio asked readers of its monthly Strawberry Newspaper to suggest a name for her, and the selection of the name "Piano" was announced in 2005. The first solo merchandise with the character under the full name "My Sweet Piano" was released in 2008.

Piano started out as a supporting character in the 2005 anime series Onegai My Melody where she only spoke by baaing and bleating. Since 2005, she's voiced by Junko Takeuchi in Japan. Piano also appears in the 2020 web series Hello Kitty and Friends: Supercute Adventures where she's a background character debuting in Season 2 where she's voiced by Michelle Marie.

In the 2025 Netflix series My Melody & Kuromi, she alongside Flat are co-stars with My Melody and Kuromi. In the series, Piano reveals to Kuromi and Flat that she's able to speak normally instead of bleating. She explains that the reason she didn't talk is due to struggling to get her proper thoughts out.

=== Goropikadon (1982) ===
Goropikadon (ゴロピカドン) are boisterous triplet brothers created in 1982. The name resembles Japanese onomatopoeia for thunder and lightning. (Note: See Wiktionary ごろごろ (gorogoro) ぴかぴか (pikapika) どん (don)) According to their backstory they come from the land of thunder, but they hate rain and are scared of thunder. Their birthday is "the twenty-fifth day of the fourteenth month of the fifty-third year of the thunder calendar." The oldest brother Don with green hair is depicted as an ambitious character who dreams of winning a Nobel Prize. Middle brother Goro has blue hair and is a prankster who eats a lot, while the pink haired youngest brother Pika is pampered but good at playing the thunder drums.

The initial character design was created by Minoru Onoue (おのうえ稔, Onoue Minoru), who also designed Pochacco and several other Sanrio characters. They were originally considered for a light bulb-shaped piggy bank, however Sanrio went with a different character. But some time later, Onoue's design appeared in a feature of rejected characters in Sanrio's Strawberry Newspaper and got a very positive response from readers. Following this, Sanrio solicited the readers to color in a blank design and send in suggestions for their names. They received 1256 responses, and from these Sanrio picked the name Goropikadon and the hair colors of the brothers. By 1983 a plethora of merchandise had been created. In 1985, new girlfriend characters for Goropikadon were unveiled in the Strawberry Newspaper. Designs based on Goropikadon were included in the Sanrio expansion for the Tamagotchi Smart from 2022.

=== Minna no Tabo (1984) ===
Minna no Tabo (ja:みんなのたあ坊, Min'na no Tābō) is a human character. According to official character profiles, his birthday is on May 5 (Children's Day), and he is a happy and energetic boy who likes sports. He is depicted surrounded by family and many animal friends. Tabo was originally designed in 1984 by Akiko Shimasue (島末彰子) for use on greeting cards.

A series of books featuring the character, called Tabo no Kotoba (たあ坊のことば, Tābō no kotoba), has according to Sanrio sold over 500 000 copies in Japan. The first book in the series, Minna No Tabo's Sai Kon Tan (今も昔も大切な100のことば みんなのたあ坊の菜根譚), by Sanrio founder Shintaro Tsuji, is based on the 16th century Chinese compilation of aphorisms Saikontan by Hong Zicheng. He has also starred in various films, OVAs, and video games such as the 1991 Famicom game Minna no Tabō no Nakayoshi Daisakusen (みんなのたあ坊のなかよし大作戦). Tabo placed first in the Sanrio Character Rankings in 1988 and 1989.

=== Zashikibuta (1984) ===
Zashikibuta (ja:ザシキブタ) is a pink pig character who is sometimes drawn wearing a green scarf. According to official character profiles, his birthday is February 4, and he lives in France with a mouse friend named Tabby. Zashikibuta topped the first Sanrio Character Rankings in 1986. In 1987, he was used in bankbooks and other goods by Nagano Bank.

=== Hangyodon (1985) ===
Hangyodon (ja:ハンギョドン) is a fish character who according to his fictional biography was born on March 14 in China. He is depicted as a character who likes joking around but also feels lonely, and whose plans of heroism often go awry. He was designed by Hisato Inoue, who also designed Bad Badtz-Maru. Hangyodon is one of the members of Hapidanbui, a group Sanrio created in 2020 to promote older characters. In 2022, Hangyodon entered the top 10 of the Sanrio Character Rankings for the first time in 34 years, placing at number 8. For his 40th anniversary in 2025, Sanrio released a music video with Hangyodon called Mysterious Star on YouTube. Other anniversary activities included pop-up cafes in four Japanese cities and a pop-up store.

=== Marron Cream (1985) ===
Marron Cream (ja:マロンクリーム, Maronkurīmu) is a rabbit girl character. She wears a dress with a wide silhouette, typically red with a white apron. According to official character profiles, she lives and attends high school in Paris, France and is interested in fashion, crafting, and cooking. Her parents are Vanilla Cream and Almond Cream, and she has a friend named Cinnamon who is a mouse. She is sometimes referred to as Marron-chan (マロンちゃん).

The character was inspired by portrayals of Paris in fashion magazines, and the idea of what life would be like for a fashionable lycéenne (high school girl) living in Paris. At first the character had no name, and an early product, a letter set, was released under the name Oshare Rabbit (fashionable rabbit). The name Marron Cream was inspired by the pastries of Paris. The word maron (マロン, chestnut) is a Japanese loanword from French, and crème de marrons (chestnut purée) is used in making Mont Blanc pastries. A signature style of Marron Cream item designs are floral patterns, going back to the first stationery released under the Marron Cream name. The designs also often feature decorative slogans in Japanese written in rōmaji using cursive.

Beginning in 1987, Marron Cream had a column in Sanrio's Strawberry Newspaper about fashion, lifestyle and do it yourself crafts, with advice on things like potpourri, soap and baking. In 1993, Sanrio released a series of three home video VHS tapes under the name Maron Kurīmu no Tezukuri Rūmu (マロンクリームの手づくりルーム, transl. Marron Cream's Homemade Room) on how to cook, make sweets and craft accessories. Also in 1993, Sanrio also published the book Maronkurīmu no Herushī Daietto (マロンクリームのヘルシー・ダイエット, transl. Marron Cream's Healthy Diet). Marron Cream was number one in the Sanrio Character Rankings in 1987, the second year the rankings were held.

=== Pokopon (1986) ===
Pokopon's Diary (ja:ぽこぽん日記, Pokoponnikki), also known as Ponpoko Pokopon, is a tanuki character with a leaf on his head wearing traditional Japanese garb. According to official character profiles, he is described as "innocent and curious", his birthday is on Jūgoya, and he enjoys writing haikus and eating dango. He currently lives in Tokyo, although earlier profiles state that he moved to Kyoto. His parents remain in the fictional Kachi-Kachi Village, and he has a girlfriend named Hana-chan.

Pokopon has starred in animated works such as the 1990 film adaptation of Journey to the West titled Pokopon no Yukai na Saiyuuki (ぽこぽんのゆかいな西遊記). He ranked in the top five in the Sanrio Character Rankings from 1987 to 1990, but his popularity has since dropped.

=== Keroppi (1988) ===
Kerokerokeroppi (ja:けろけろけろっぴ), also known as Keroppi Hasunoue (はすの上 けろっぴ, Hasunoue Keroppi), is a frog character with large eyes, pink cheeks and a V-shaped mouth. Keroppi was designed by Akiko Chii, who also designed Pompompurin. "Kero" means "frog's croak" and "Hasunoue" means "on a lily pad". Keroppi is portrayed with a large family and many friends who are frogs. He is also friends with Denden, a snail, and Teruteru, a teru teru bōzu. Originally created as part of a promotion for the rainy season, the first Keroppi items were released in 1988. Designs in Japan commonly include puns on the Japanese word for frog, kaeru (かえる), which has many homonyms. According to British newspaper The Independent, the popularity of Keroppi was close to that of Hello Kitty in the early 1990s, "particularly in the UK", but then went down. Keroppi was number one in the Sanrio Character Rankings in 1990.

Keroppi has appeared in video games, including Kero Kero Keroppi no Bouken Nikki, Kero Kero Keroppi no Daibouken, and Sanrio World Smash Ball! In 2019 and 2021, a character and items with designs inspired by Keroppi were featured in the Sanrio Animal Crossing Amiibo card series, as well as in a Sanrio themed event in Animal Crossing: Pocket Camp. He has also appeared in several animated series. In Japanese, Keroppi is voiced by Yoshiko Matsuo. In English, he was voiced by Jill Frappier in Keroppi and Friends, Kira Vincent-Davis in Hello Kitty's Animation Theater, Sarah Hauser in The Adventures of Hello Kitty and Friends, and Georgie Kidder in Hello Kitty and Friends Supercute Adventures.

=== Pochacco (1989) ===
Pochacco (ja:ポチャッコ, Pochakko) is drawn as a white dog with black floppy ears, but no visible mouth. Pochacco's name means pocha pocha (chubby). According to official character profiles, he was born in Fuwafuwa Town on February 29 in a leap year. He is often portrayed dressed in athletic attire, with a sporty and playful personality. He was designed by Minoru Onoue (おのうえ稔), who also designed several other Sanrio characters, including Goropikadon. When Pochacco was first released, he was not drawn wearing clothes and his behavior was more dog-like. His popularity increased after the design was changed to show him wearing shirts. Pochacco's bird friends, the Piichans Piyo, Pico, and Peebu, were named by soliciting names from readers of Sanrio's Strawberry Newspaper. Pochacco was number one in the Sanrio Character Rankings from 1991 to 1995. In 2024, for his 35th anniversary, temporary Pochacco-themed Cafes were opened in Tokyo and Osaka.

== 1990s ==
=== Pekkle (1990) ===
Pekkle (ja:あひるのペックル, Ahiru no Pekkuru) is a small white duck character who typically wears a blue T-shirt with the letter P, created by Sanrio in 1989. According to official character profiles, Pekkle's birthday is on July 27, he was born in Cairns, Australia, and he is a "good-natured" boy who loves to sing and tap dance. Unlike most Sanrio characters designed at the time, Pekkle's design includes eyebrows in order to give him a more "goofy" and relatable appearance. Pekkle first debuted in merchandise released in 1990, and he later starred in a manga series titled Ganbare! Pekkle (がんばれ！ペックル), which ran in Strawberry Newspaper from 1991 to 1997 and featured his family and friends, including various duck characters, a trio of fish siblings, and a green bird character named Chara. Pekkle also appeared in four OVAs in the early 1990s.

Pekkle had a decline in popularity, not entering the top 10 in the Sanrio Character Rankings from 1994 onward and going a period of 10 years without new merchandise. He finally reached tenth place in the Sanrio Character Rankings in 2025, which may be attributed to a rising interest in his character due to his role as the leader of Hapidanbui, a boy group of older Sanrio characters which debuted in 2020.

=== Spottie Dottie (1990) ===
Spottie Dottie (スポッティドッティ, Supotti Dotti) is a Dalmatian dog character. According to official character profiles, her birthday is March 21, and she lives in New York City, likes fashion, and is friends with a cat named Sassy. Unlike most Sanrio characters, she is non-anthropomorphic. In 2010, The New York Times described Spottie Dottie and the character Pandapple as "flops" for the Sanrio corporation in terms of popularity.

=== Monkichi (1991) ===
Monkichi (ja:おさるのもんきち, Osaru no Monkichi) is a light brown monkey character drawn with a curly tail and prominent round eyes. According to official character profiles, his birthday is January 13, and his full name is Oyama No Monkichi, which translates to "Monkichi of the Mountains". He is portrayed as a happy character who likes jokes and poems and wants to become a comedian or a poet.

An animated OVA called Osaru no Monkichi no Kin no Ono Gin no Ono (おさるのもんきちの金の斧銀の斧) was released in 2001.

=== PataPataPeppy (1992) ===
PataPataPeppy (パタパタペッピー, PataPataPeppī) is a horned owl character drawn with a sketchy look. He was designed by Matsubayashi Atsushi (松林あつし) who subsequently left Sanrio and started his own studio. According to official character profiles, his birthday is August 26 and he was born in the Northern woods. He is often depicted carrying a cherry in his mouth as it is his favourite food.

=== Bad Badtz-Maru (1993) ===
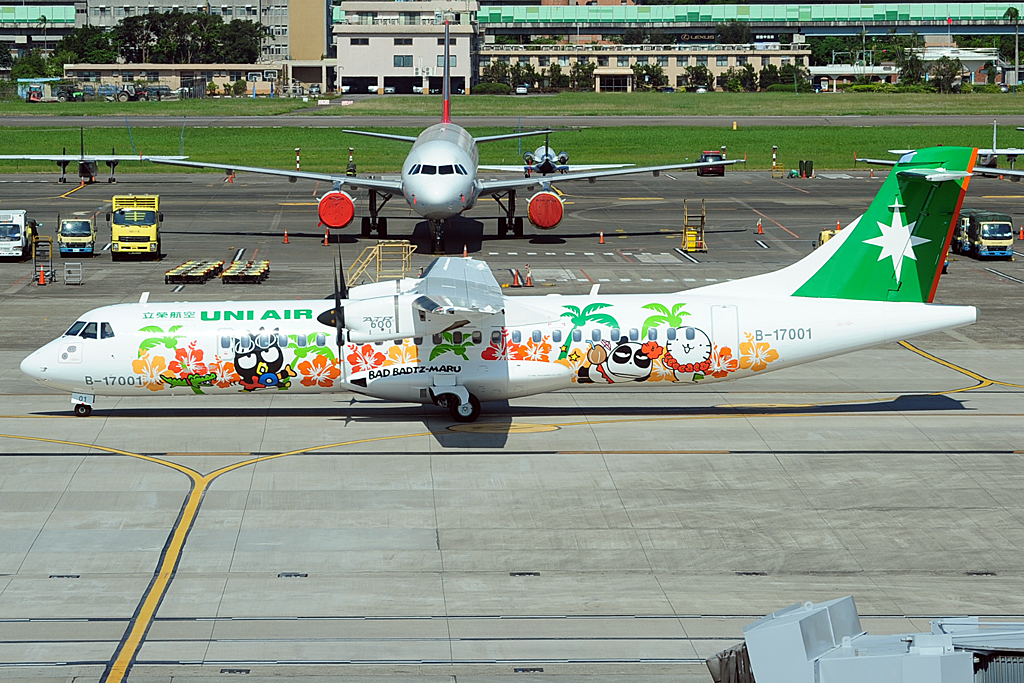
A Uni Air plane painted in a Badtz-Maru motif, 2016

Bad Badtz-Maru (ja:バッドばつ丸, Baddo batsu maru) is a male penguin character drawn with spiky hair. He was designed by Hisato Inoue, who also designed Hangyodon. In Japanese, "badtz" (batsu) is a term for "X", the cross signifying a wrong answer. "Maru" means circle or "O", and signifies a right answer. Thus, his name figuratively means "wrong-right", and is frequently represented by "XO". Badtz-Maru is depicted with many different facial expressions and poses, but a common expression is pulling one lower eyelid down and sticking out his tongue, a gesture equivalent to blowing a raspberry.

According to official profiles, Badtz-Maru's birthday is April 1 (April Fool's Day). He is portrayed as being surrounded by friends and family, such as Hana-Maru, a friendly white seal; Pandaba, a female panda who wears a red bikini skirt; and Pochi, a baby alligator whom Badtz-Maru treats like a pet dog.

Badtz-Maru has appeared in many product lines since his release by Sanrio in 1993. He has been portrayed as an astronaut, motorcyclist, DJ, camouflage monster, basketball player, boxer, and many others. His products range from typical stationery supplies (e.g. pens, notebooks, erasers, pencil cases, etc.) to more novelty items (e.g., CD players, guitars, license plate frames, etc.).

Badtz-Maru was number one in the Sanrio Character Rankings in 1996. He was the official mascot for the 2006 FIBA World Championship of basketball, which was held in Japan. Uni Air and EVA Air began flying with airplanes painted with Badtz-Maru motifs in 2016 and 2017. He is also one of the main characters in the 2020 Hello Kitty and Friends Supercute Adventures YouTube web series.

=== Chococat (1996) ===
Chococat (チョコキャット, Chokokyatto) is drawn as a black cat with huge black eyes, four whiskers, and like his counterpart Hello Kitty, no mouth. His name comes from his chocolate-colored nose. According to official character profiles, Chococat's birthday is May 10, and his whiskers are able to pick up information like antennae, so he is often the first to know about things. He was originally pictured with a blue collar, but he has since been depicted wearing different colored collars, scarves, and even a Hawaiian lei. Sanrio has also produced Chococat products that portray him in different colors like brown and pink.

Chococat is one of the characters in the 2020 web series Hello Kitty and Friends: Supercute Adventures, voiced by Michelle Marie. He was the third most successful Sanrio character in 2005, after Hello Kitty and Cinnamoroll.

=== Pompompurin (1996) ===
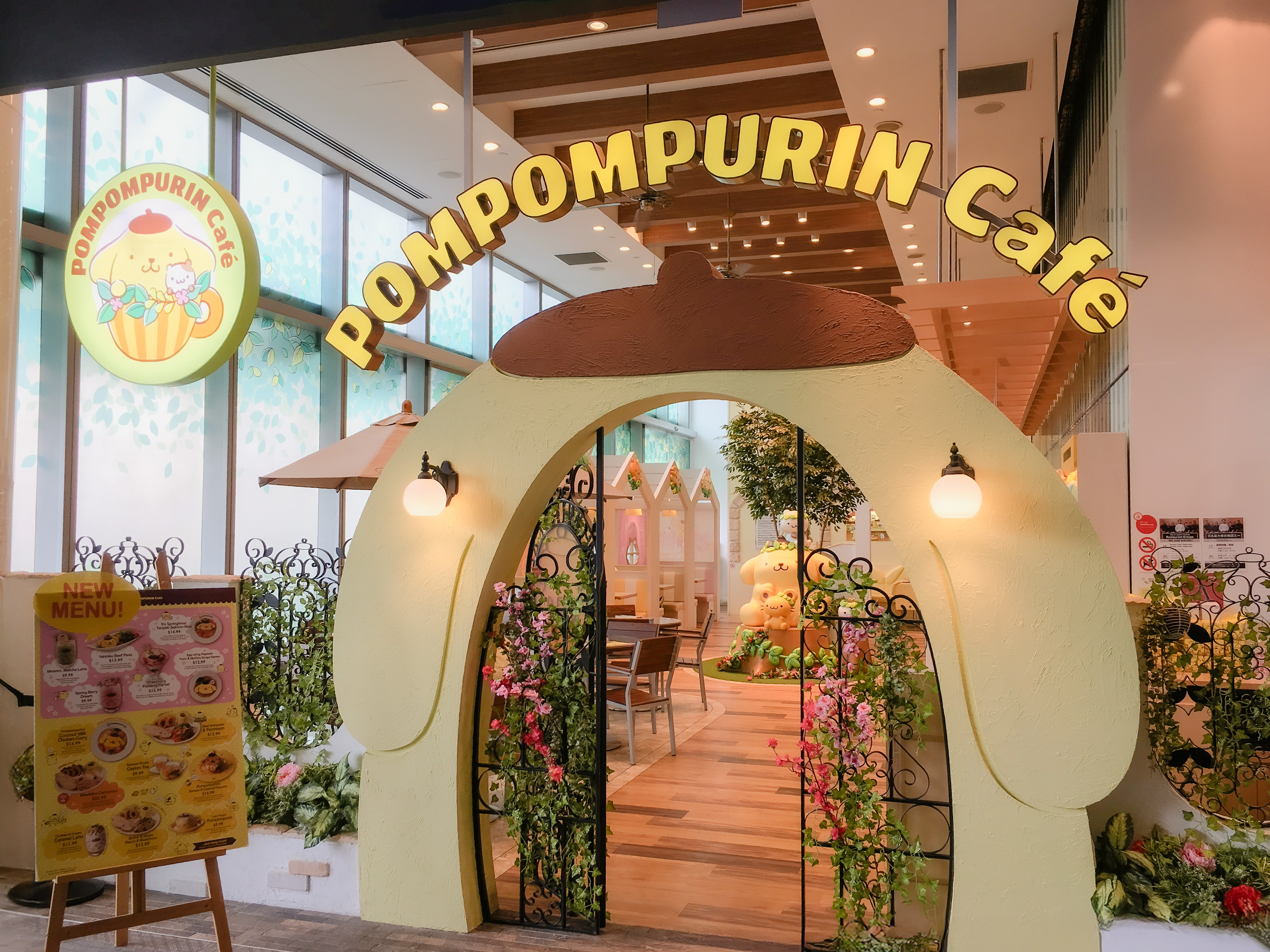
A Pompompurin Café in Singapore, 2017

Pompompurin (ja:ポムポムプリン, Pomupomupurin) is a golden retriever dog character first introduced in 1996. He was designed by Akiko Chii, who also designed Keroppi. He is usually depicted wearing a brown beret and resembles a pudding (flan). According to official profiles, Pompompurin was born on April 16, and his friends include a hamster called Muffin, a mouse named Scone, a squirrel named Bagel, and a bird named Custard. Pompompurin's most distinctive characteristic is his asterisk-shaped butthole mark, which is shared by several of his friends and incorporated into official Pompompurin-themed merchandise.

Sanrio produced two OVAs with Pompompurin in 2001, Pomupomupurin no Usagi to Kame (ポムポムプリンのうさぎとかめ) and Pomupomupurin no Kitakaze to Taiyō (ポムポムプリンの北風と太陽). Two Pompompurin video games were released for the Nintendo 3DS in 2016 and 2017. In celebration of his 30th anniversary, Sanrio officially released two singles by Pompompurin on music streaming platforms on March 25, 2026.

A Pompompurin Café was opened in Harajuku in Tokyo in 2014. Subsequently, several Pompompurin Cafés were opened in other locations. Pompompurin was voted most popular in the Sanrio Character Rankings in 1997, just one year after his debut. After a small slump in popularity from 2003 to 2009, Pompompurin had a resurgence and topped the Sanrio Character Rankings in 2015, 2016, 2025, and 2026.

=== Corocorokuririn (1998) ===
Corocorokuririn (ja:コロコロクリリン, Korokorokuririn) is a golden hamster character who is drawn wearing a flower as a hat. He is portrayed as having seven hamster children with a female hamster named Sakura. In addition to his family, Kuririn is depicted with many friends. In total, there are 86 different hamster characters. The character was created at a time when hamsters were popular as pets in Japan. The original designs were created by Koji Ito (伊藤 康二, Itō Kōji) and the character was introduced in 1998.

Kuririn, Sakura, and their children were modeled on real life hamsters that were kept at the office of Sanrio. Kuririn's fictional birthday, February 4, was based on the date the hamster was brought to the office. New owners for the real life hamster offspring were solicited from among readers of Sanrio's Strawberry Newspaper who also coined some of the names used for the fictional hamster children. A manga called Kuririn Diary (クリリン日記, Kuririn Nikki) was published in the Strawberry Newspaper and in both Japanese and English online. The manga blends reality and fiction by including photographs of the real hamsters with drawings of the fictional characters.

=== Dear Daniel (1999) ===
Dear Daniel (ja:ディアダニエル, Diadanieru), full name Daniel Starr (ダニエル・スター, Danieru sutā), is a cat character who is depicted as Hello Kitty's boyfriend. His character profile describes him as born in London on May 3. He was a childhood friend of Hello Kitty's, but he traveled with his parents and was away from her for a long time. He is portrayed as fashionable and sensitive, good at dancing and playing the piano, with an interest in photography, and dreams of being famous.

Dear Daniel was designed in 1999 by Yuko Yamaguchi, the lead designer of Hello Kitty since 1980. Yamaguchi was inspired to create a boyfriend for Hello Kitty in the late 1990s when the Japanese singer Namie Amuro talked publicly about having a boyfriend, something that was considered controversial at the time. The character's name was inspired by the British film Melody from 1971, where the romantic lead is called Daniel.

== 2000s ==
=== Usahana (2000) ===
Usahana (ja:ウサハナ) (also stylized as U*SA*HA*NA) is a rabbit character drawn with different colored ears, one pink and one blue, and a flower on her head. According to official character profiles, her birthday is August 7, and her full name is Hanachan.

The character was adopted into a short anime series, Usahana: Dreaming Ballerina (ウサハナ: 夢見るバレリーナ, Usahana: Yumemiru Ballerina), which aired as part of Kitty's Paradise Plus in 2006. In the series, Usahana dreams of becoming a ballerina.

=== Cinnamoroll (2001) ===
Cinnamoroll (シナモロール, Shinamorōru) was created in 2001, with character designs from Miyuki Okumura. The main character, who is known by the names Cinnamoroll and Cinnamon (シナモン, Shinamon), is depicted as a white dog with a curly tail that resembles a cinnamon roll, and long ears he can fly with. According to official character profiles, his birthday is March 6. Other characters in the series include Cappuccino (カプチーノ, Kapuchīno), with a mouth that looks like a cup of cappuccino, Chiffon (シフォン, Shifon) with ears that are fluffy like a chiffon cake, Espresso (エスプレッソ, Esupuresso) with a Mozart hairstyle, Mocha (モカ, Moka) with chocolate-brown fur, and Milk (みるく, Miruku), a white baby puppy.

An anime film featuring Cinnamoroll called Cinnamon the Movie was released in 2007, and a manga series by Yumi Tsukirino called Fluffy, Fluffy Cinnamoroll (ふわふわ♥シナモン, Fuwafuwa ♥ Shinamon) was published between 2004 and 2008. On September 11, 2023, Sanrio started a YouTube channel for Cinnamon which streams a short anime called Cinnamon Anime Damon (シナモンアニメだもん, Shinamon Anime Damon), with an English version uploaded to Sanrio's American YouTube Channel. Several video games featuring Cinnamoroll were released for Game Boy Advance and Nintendo DS.

Cinnamoroll expanded into two side series: Cinnamoangels (シナモエンジェルス, Shinamoenjerusu) in 2005 and Lloromannic (ルロロマニック, Ruroromanikku) in 2007.

Cinnamoroll was the second most successful Sanrio character in 2005, after Hello Kitty. Cinnamoroll was voted number 1 in the Sanrio Character Rankings from 2017–2018, and again from 2020–2024.

=== Pandapple (2002) ===
Pandapple (パンダップル, Pandappuru) is a panda character who is drawn wearing a red apple hat and a shirt. Pandapple is often depicted accompanied by a caterpillar named Imomushi. According to official character profiles, his birthday is June 2, he was born in Shanghai, China, and he moved to southern California. In 2010, The New York Times described Pandapple and the character Spottie Dottie as "flops" for the Sanrio corporation in terms of popularity.

=== Charmmy Kitty (2004) ===
Charmmy Kitty (チャーミーキティ, Chāmīkiti) is a white Persian cat character that is depicted as Hello Kitty's pet. She resembles Hello Kitty, but she has more cat-like behavior and features. According to Sanrio's profile, Charmmy Kitty was a gift from Hello Kitty's papa, and since her real birthday is unknown, they celebrate the day Hello Kitty received her, October 31. She is described as docile, obedient and fond of shiny things. Her necklace holds the key to Hello Kitty's jewelry box. Charmmy Kitty and Hello Kitty's pet hamster Sugar were created in 2004 when the popularity of pets went up in Japan in an attempt to appeal to the teenage market. She was designed by Yuko Yamaguchi who has been the lead designer of Hello Kitty since 1980. She also has a younger sister named Honey Cute, a smaller Persian cat with light pink fur.

=== Sugarbunnies (2004) ===
The Sugarbunnies (シュガーバニーズ, Shugābanīzu) are twin rabbit characters Shirousa (シロうさ, Shirousa) and Kurousa (クロうさ, Kurousa) who are depicted making sweets and pastries. According to official character profiles, they were both born on May 26 and live in the fictional magical world of Bunniesfield. They were designed by Kazumi Fukasawa (深沢和美). Due to the success of the franchise, Sanrio created more sets of rabbit twins who each specialize in their own jobs.

In 2007, Sanrio created an anime series based on the franchise which aired on TV Tokyo and Kids Station on April 3, 2007, and ended later that year with 27 episodes. After the anime's success, the series gained two sequels in 2008 (Sugarbunnies: Chocolat!) and in 2009 (Sugarbunnies: Fleur), each having 27 episodes.

=== Cinnamoangels (2005) ===
The Cinnamoangels (シナモエンジェルス, Shinamoenjerusu), also known as Cinnamon Angels in English, are a spinoff from the main Cinnamoroll series. They are a trio of girl puppy characters consisting of Mocha (born February 20), Chiffon (born January 14) and Azuki (born September 25). According to their fictional story, Mocha founded the group because she wants to become a TV idol.

Cinnamoangels have their own manga series called Puri Kawa Cinnamo Angels!! (プリ☆かわ☆シナモエンジェルス!!, Puri Kawa Shinamoenjerusu!!) which was published as part of the Fluffy, Fluffy Cinnamoroll volumes. Sanrio has also released several music videos featuring the trio.

=== Kuromi (2005) ===
Kuromi (ja:クロミ) first appeared as the rival of My Melody in the anime Onegai My Melody. She is depicted as a white rabbit wearing a black jester's hat with a pink skull that sometimes adjusts to match her mood on the front and a black "devil" tail in the place of a normal rabbit's tail. Kuromi has also been portrayed as the leader of a biker gang known as "Kuromi's 5" whose members wear black and ride their bikes around in a menacing fashion. Kuromi's sidekick is Baku (ja:バク) a purple tapir character who takes Kuromi flying on his back. Similar to the baku from Japanese folklore, he is depicted as being able to seek out people's dreams.

Merchandise featuring Kuromi first appeared in Japan in 2005. She has three image songs all sung by her voice actress, Junko Takeuchi. In the 2020 web series Hello Kitty and Friends: Supercute Adventures, Kuromi is one of the main characters where she's voiced by Jenny Yokobori. In the English version of Greedy Greedy and Kuromi's Pretty Journey, she's voiced by singer Diana Garnet.

In 2021, Sanrio began a marketing campaign for Kuromi in Shibuya and on social media using the slogan "KUROMIfy the World". In 2022, Kuromi beat her rival in the Sanrio Character Rankings for the first time, placing at number three, while My Melody placed at number five.

In February 2023, Sanrio began streaming a series of anime shorts called Kuromi's Pretty Journey introducing Romina, Kuromi's older sister, as well as other new characters. Episodes of the anime were given a weekly release schedule. The end theme of the series is performed by the singer ano (ja:あの), formerly of the group You'll Melt More!. An English version was uploaded to Sanrio's American YouTube Channel in June 2023. A second season of the web series began in October 2024.

In February 2025, Studio Comet filed a lawsuit against Sanrio, stating that they hold the legal rights to Kuromi's design. They said that the character was designed by Tomoko Miyakawa (ja:宮川 知子) while she was employed by Studio Comet to work on the Onegai My Melody anime, and that the name "Kuromi" was coined by the series director, Makoto Moriwaki. The book Kuromi's Secrets (クロミのヒミツ, Kuromi no Himitsu) from 2023 says Kuromi was created by Hello Kitty lead designer Yuko Yamaguchi.

Kuromi co-stars with My Melody in the 2025 stop-motion anime series, titled My Melody & Kuromi, released worldwide on July 24, 2025, on Netflix, as part of their joint celebration for their 50th and 20th anniversaries. Junko Takeuchi returned from Onegai My Melody to be the Japanese voice of Kuromi, while Jenny Yokobori reprised her role as Kuromi's English dubbed voice.

=== Tenorikuma (2005) ===
Tenorikuma (ja:てのりくま) (Japanese for "bears that fit in your palm") are a group of red panda characters who are portrayed running a coffee shop called Tenorikuma. The main manager character is Latte, who is depicted with a heart on his ear. Maple is the only female character and Latte's love interest. There are several other red panda characters who all wear different colored scarves. Other characters include Mister Steam who is a cloud of steam and Muddler-san who is a spoon.

A picture book called Tenorikuma Chisana Coffee Break (Tenorikuma 小さなコーヒーブレイク) was released in 2005. A manga series by Yumimi (ja:ゆみみ) called Puchitto! Tenorikuma (プチっと！ てのりくま) was serialized in Nakayoshi magazine from 2007 to 2008. One volume of the manga was released in 2008.

=== Masyumaro (2006) ===
Masyumaro (ja:マシュマロみたいなふわふわにゃんこ, Mashumaromitainafuwafuwanyanko) is a white kitten character with light brown spots around the ears. He is depicted as residing in Paris, France. Designed by Kazue Yamada (山田和恵) who also designed Bonbonribbon. He is featured in two promotional videos, Boku Masyumaro (My Marshmallow) and Kirakira Sute-ji (Stage Glitter).

=== Lloromannic (2007) ===
Lloromannic (ja:ルロロマニック, Ruroromanikku) is a spinoff from Cinnamoroll. The name is "Cinnamoroll" in reverse and Lloromannic is described as a world on the other side of a mirror that is the opposite of the cute world of Cinnamoroll. The Lloromannic characters are Berry (ベリー, Berī) and Cherry (チェリー, Cherī) who are depicted as two demons who came from the Lloromannic mirror world but now live in a haunted mansion on the outskirts of Cinnamoroll's town. Designed by Miyuki Okumura who also designed the main Cinnamoroll series.

Berry and Cherry show up in the anime Onegai♪My Melody Kirara★ as narrators. Two short videos have been released on DVD: "Trick" and "Friend".

=== Jewelpets (2008) ===
The Jewelpets (ジュエルペット, Juerupetto) are a group of animal characters created in 2008 as a joint-venture between Sanrio and Sega Toys. There are 42 characters in the franchise and each of the animals are named after famous Birthstones, Minerals and Jewels. They each have a different kind of sparkling jewel for their eyes, used for casting special magic called "Jewel Flash". According to fiction, they belong to magicians and live in a mystical place called Jewel Land, attending a school to learn more about magic and each of them is paired with their own human partners. The main Jewelpets in the series are Ruby, the white Japanese hare (whose birthday is July 29), Sapphie, the blue and yellow Cavalier King Charles Spaniel (whose birthday is September 1), Garnet, the pink Persian cat (whose birthday is January 8), and Labra the pink and white polar bear (whose birthday is December 27).

In 2008, Sega Toys collaborated with Sanrio to release a line of plush toys featuring the characters from the series, which contained a special password to access the Web-Gurumi website. This is somewhat similar to the toy franchise Webkinz, as it also shares some similarities to the secret codes to access the Webkinz World website, causing some controversies between the two companies. Later on April 4, 2009, its first anime series was produced by Studio Comet and started to air on both TV Osaka and TV Tokyo, replacing Onegai My Melody Kirara★ in its timeslot. The anime focuses on the heroine Rinko Kōgyoku and her Jewelpet partner Ruby. A second series titled Jewelpet Twinkle☆ (ジュエルペット てぃんくる☆, Juerupetto Tinkuru☆) premiered later on TV Tokyo from April 3, 2010, to March 26, 2011, with 52 episodes. The second series premiered later in Spain as part of the Boing programming block. A third series titled Jewelpet Sunshine (ジュエルペット サンシャイン, Juerupetto Sanshain) premiered on April 9, 2011. A fourth series titled Jewelpet Kira☆Deco—! (ジュエルペット きら☆デコッ！, Juerupetto Kira☆deko—!) aired on April 7, 2012.

A full-length feature film titled Jewelpet the Movie: Sweets Dance Princess (映画ジュエルペット スウィーツダンスプリンセス, Eiga Juerupetto: Suuītsu Dansu Purinsesu) which was directed by Hiroaki Sakurai (Director of UFO Baby and Cromartie High School) and distributed by Toho, was released on August 11, 2012, in Japanese cinemas.

A second Jewelpet feature film titled Jewelpet Attack Travel! (ジュエルペット あたっくとらべる!,, Juerupetto Atakku Toraberu!) was announced in 2019 and originally scheduled for a February 2020 release in Japan, but it did not get released until 2022 on NicoNico.

=== Yoshikitty (2009) ===
Yoshikitty is character based on Japanese musician Yoshiki created in 2009 by Yuko Yamaguchi. The brand specializes in rock-themed and high fashion goods, and was voted more popular than Hello Kitty in the 2018 Sanrio Character Ranking. In 2019, a limited-edition 18k gold Yoshikitty figurine was released in collaboration with precious metal company Ginza Tanaka, with an estimated retail cost of US$10,000.

== 2010s ==
=== Wish me mell (2010) ===
Wish Me Mell (ja:ウイッシュミーメル, Uisshu mī meru) is a character series which was released in 2010, Designed by Miyuki Okumura, who also designed Cinnamoroll. Wish Me Mell, the main heroine of the series, is meant to be a character that expresses the feelings every one has, simply stating "Thank you", "I am sorry" or "I like you!", connecting hearts in the process. The series is targeted towards females aged 15–20, who are too shy to express their feelings towards others.

Wish Me Mell is portrayed as living with her friends in the fictional magical world of Merci Hills (メルシーヒルズ, Merushī hiruzu) where everyone is living happily while their feelings are connected towards each other and words like "thank you" can bring warmth to everyone's hearts. Wish Me Mell and her friends are depicted as being guided by the Rainbow Fairy, Ciel, who gives them missions and advice.

=== Go-chan (2011) ===
Go-chan (ja:ゴーちゃん。, Gō-chan.), full official name GoExPanda (ゴーエクスパンダ), is the mascot of TV Asahi and debuted in 2011. According to official character profiles, his birthday is May 5. He was designed by Yuko Yamaguchi, who is also the designer in charge of new Hello Kitty designs. Two anime films with Go-chan have been released.

=== Ichigoman (2011) ===
Ichigoman (イチゴマン, Ichigoman) is a superhero alter ego of Hello Kitty. The name "Ichigoman" translates to "Strawberry man", and the character is depicted with strawberry ears and a red superhero suit. According to Sanrio's backstory, Hello Kitty finds a smartphone shaped like a strawberry, and when she holds it up and shouts "Power the Kitty" she turns into Ichigoman to fight evil. Darkgrapeman and Honeymomo, who are both skilled in martial arts, join Ichigoman in the fight.

Designed by Yuko Yamaguchi, lead designer for most of Hello Kitty's history, the character first appeared in 2011 in an exhibition with Yamaguchi's art. Yamaguchi said she hoped Ichigoman would reach a male demographic. An anime short featuring the character was released in 2012. A web manga called Power the Kitty Ichigoman (パワーザキティ イチゴマン) began in Japan in 2016. The manga is written by Toshiki Inoue and illustrated by Shakua Sinkai. It depicts Ichigoman dealing with an alien invasion and piloting a giant robot. Four tankōbon volumes of the manga have been published by Shueisha, with a fifth volume released digitally.

=== Bonbonribbon (2012) ===
Bonbonribbon (ja:ぼんぼんりぼん, Bonbon ribon) is a pink rabbit character who is drawn wearing several ribbon bows. Designed by Kazue Yamada (山田和恵) who also designed Masyumaro. According to official profiles, Bonbonribbon's birthday is August 8, and she is a fashionable girl who likes to sing and dance, and wants to become an accessory designer. Her mother is portrayed as a fashion designer who designed the ribbon on Bonbonribbon's head. A video game called Bonbon Ribbon: Tokimeki Coord Kirakira Dance was released in 2015 for the Nintendo 3DS.

=== Gudetama (2013) ===
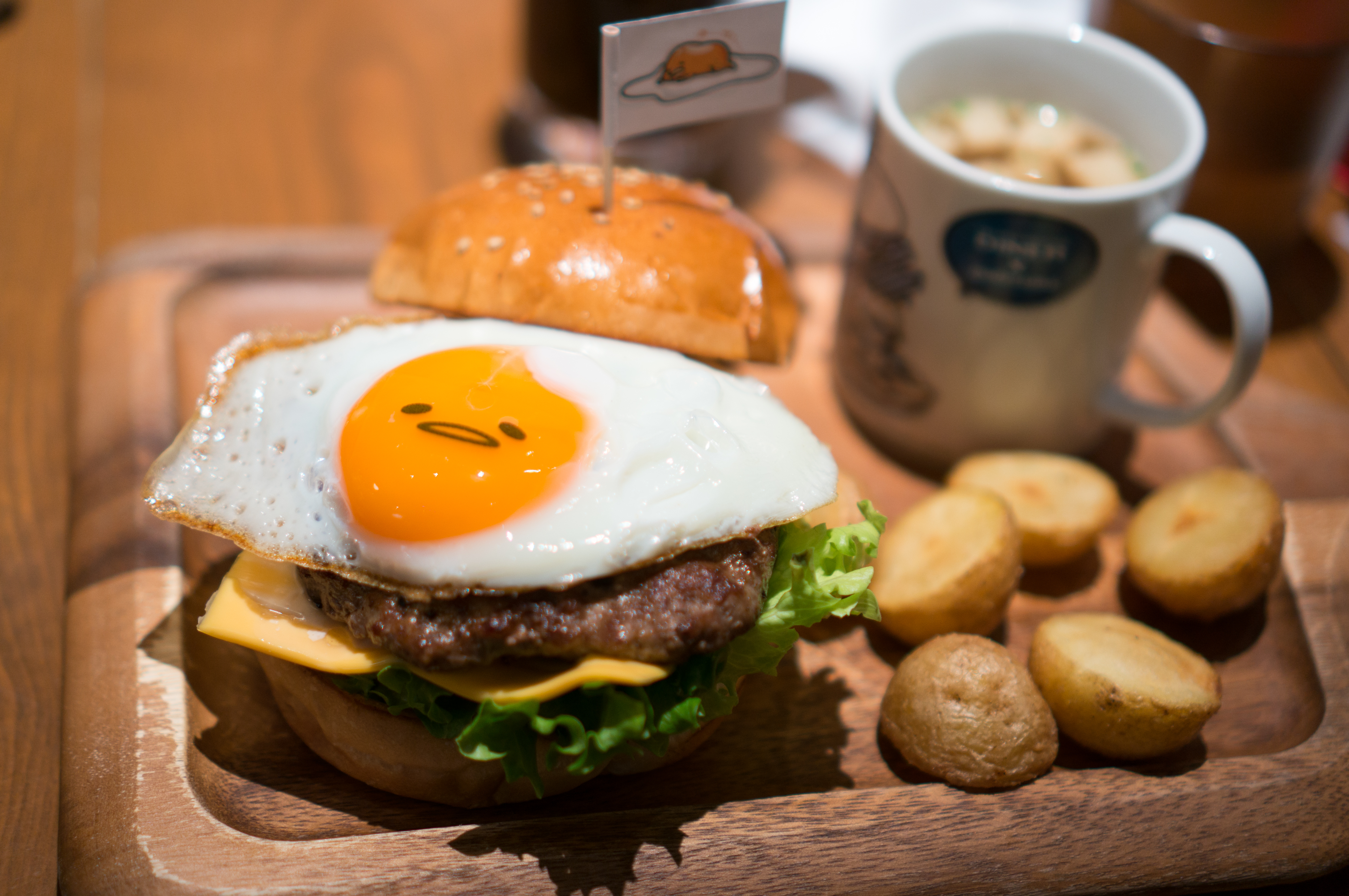
Food at a Gudetama themed pop-up cafe in Japan, 2015

Gudetama (ぐでたま) is a Sanrio character who debuted in 2013. The character is an anthropomorphized egg yolk whose main trait is laziness. Designed by a Sanrio designer who goes by the name Amy, real name Emi Nagashima (永嶋 瑛美). The name Gudetama is derived from the Japanese words for lazy (ぐでぐで, gudegude) and egg (たまご, tamago). Gudetama is often depicted reclining on an egg white or as an ingredient in a Japanese dish. The character debuted following a contest run by Sanrio to introduce new characters based on Japanese food, in which Gudetama came second to Kirimichan. There have been a number of Gudetama themed pop-up cafes serving egg-related dishes in Japan. Gudetama merchandise is also available, ranging from stationery to confectionery to toys.

There are two Japanese video games with Gudetama on the Nintendo 3DS, released in 2015 and 2016, and a Gudetama-themed Tamagotchi from 2017. The mobile game Gudetama Tap! was released in 2019 and is a casual collecting game. A series of animated Gudetama shorts were aired daily on the Japanese channel TBS between 2014 and 2020. Each episode of the series is only about one minute long, and as of 2019, there were over 1200 episodes. In December 2022, a live-action/CGI hybrid series called Gudetama: An Eggcellent Adventure was released to Netflix worldwide with a total of 10 episodes. The series involves Gudetama and the chick character Shakipiyo searching across Japan for their mother. As of 2019, Gudetama was Sanrio's third most profitable character, behind Hello Kitty and My Melody.

=== Kirimichan (2013) ===
Kirimichan (ja:KIRIMIちゃん., Kirimichan) is an anthropomorphized slice of salmon fillet. Depicted as a happy character who wants to be eaten, Sanrio's profiles say that Kirimichan is "a star in the sliced food world" and instead of a birthday, that the character "was first filleted on August 31st". According to official profiles, Kirimichan's closest friend is Kamaboko-chan, a slice of kamaboko (a type of fish cake.) The character is portrayed surrounded by many sliced food friends like Saba-kun (a mackerel fillet) and Tai-kun (a sea bream fillet.)

Kirimichan was designed by Ai Setani (瀬谷愛) who also designed Rilu Rilu Fairilu. Setani wanted to make something different from the usual Sanrio cuteness, and the character was inspired by a salmon her daughter liked when she was three. Kirimichan was originally created in 2013 as part of a in-house competition at Sanrio to create food based characters, and was then selected as the winner in an online poll. The egg yolk character Gudetama placed second in the same poll.

The first items with Kirimichan were released in 2014. In addition to typical merchandise like bags and stationery, actual salmon fillets and salmon flavored candy branded with Kirimichan on the packaging have also been sold. A theme song and a music CD with the character, performed by voice actor Tsubasa Yonaga, were released in 2014. In 2015 the Japanese Ministry of Agriculture, Forestry and Fisheries appointed Kirimichan as "Ambassador of Let's Eat Fish" in an effort to encourage people to eat more fish.

=== Plasmagica (2013) ===
Plasmagica (プラズマジカ, Purazumajika) is an all-girl fictional band who debuted in Sanrio's iOS game Show by Rock, which is geared towards young boys. The band is formed by strange corporation president in order to grow to become the best rock band. In the game, they all battle all the bands of Midi City to become the best in the world and aim to be music millionaires. Plasmagica is composed of 4 Mumon girls, the cat girl Cyan (シアン, Shian) (Guitar and Vocals, voiced by Eri Inagawa), the rabbit girl ChuChu (チュチュ, Chuchu) (Guitar and Vocals, voiced by Sumire Uesaka), the dog girl Retoree (レトリー, Retorī) (Bass and Vocals, voiced by Eri Kitamura) and the sheep girl Moa (モア, Moa) (Drums and Vocals, voiced by Ayane Sakura).

=== Hummingmint (2014) ===
Hummingmint (ja:ハミングミント, Haminguminto) is a female fawn character who, according to her backstory, lives in a forest in Scandinavia, and was born March 10. The Hummingmint designs were inspired by Scandinavian textile design and marketed to mothers with young daughters. In 2015, Sanrio posted an 8 episode digital picture book with stories of Hummingmint in the Forest of Discovery (はっけんのもり, hakken no mori). In 2017, a picture book called Hummingmint Oki ni Iri no Bōshi (ハミングミント おきにいりのぼうし) was published.

=== Aggressive Retsuko (2015) ===
Aggressive Retsuko (アグレッシブ烈子, shortened to Aggretsuko in English) is a female red panda character. She is portrayed as an administrative assistant in a Japanese business, relieving the stress of an oppressive and frustrating working life by drinking and singing angry death metal in a karaoke bar. She was designed by a Sanrio designer working under the name Yeti. A short TV anime series exploring her daily life in the workplace with her co-workers was created in 2016. This series was later expanded with a Netflix series which streamed worldwide for five seasons between 2018 and 2023, with a Christmas special released December 2018.

=== Cogimyun (2015) ===
Cogimyun (ja:こぎみゅん) is a Cogimuna (コギムーナ) wheat flour fairy character who is white and fluffy and floats in the air. She is portrayed as a character who is sensitive and easily falls apart into a small heap of flour. Who, despite being made of wheat, wants to be an onigiri rice ball because that is her grandfather's favorite food. She lives in a world of everyday realism and deals with ordinary hardships like money troubles. She has a pet fried shrimp known as Ebifurai (エビフライ) or Ebi-chan (エビちゃん). According to official character profiles, her birthday is on May 7 (Powder Day).

In 2017, a series of Cogimyun anime shorts began streaming on AbemaTV. It follows Cogimyun as she starts taking care of the Cogimucorpo apartment building after her grandfather goes travelling. The series features many different flour based food characters, like Gyoza-kun (ぎょうざくん) the Takoyaki Sisters (たこやきシスターズ) and Udon-san (うどんさん.) The voice of Cogimyun is provided by the voice actor Hanayu (ja:花柚). The model Ryuchell made their voice acting debut as Choco Cornet (チョココロネェ), one of the residents in the apartment building. The series theme song is performed by Sonoko Inoue.

In 2019, live streaming appearances with Cogimyun began on Line Live. The same year, a manga series featuring Cogimyun began publishing in Ne~Ne~ (ja:ね〜ね〜) magazine. Also in 2019, the Sanrio Boys franchise added a new character called Yasuhiro Koga who is a fan of Cogimyun. In 2021, a new character was introduced called Cogimyon (こぎみょん.) He is depicted as Cogimyun's little brother, who came to life when her tears fell on a ball of wheat clay. Cogimyun has gone up in the Sanrio Character Rankings since first placing 28 in 2018, and as of 2022, she ranked number 9. A character based on Cogimyun is included in the Sanrio expansion for the Tamagotchi Uni from 2024.

=== Little Forest Fellow (2015) ===
Little Forest Fellow (ja:リトルフォレストフェロォ, Ritoruforesutofero~o) nicknamed Melo (めろぉ, Mero~o) is a rabbit character that is a spinoff from My Melody. He is portrayed as a cousin of My Melody, and the red hood he wears was a gift from her.

In April 2017, Melo began hosting a radio show called Mero's Friend Song (めろぉのフレンズソング) on the internet radio network TS ONE. The radio show plays soothing music while various Sanrio characters make occasional appearances.

=== Sanrio Boys (2015) ===
The Sanrio Boys (サンリオ男子, Sanrio Danshi) is a group of high school-aged boys who met due to their love of Sanrio's mascots. The fictional story depicts the group as beginning with the unassuming Kōta Hasegawa (長谷川康太), who loves the character Pompompurin, coincidentally running into the My Melody-loving Yū Mizuno (水野 祐) and bonding over it. Together with Hello Kitty fan Shunsuke Yoshino (吉野俊介), Cinnamoroll fan Seiichiro Minamoto (源誠一郎), and the Little Twin Stars fan Ryō Nishimiya (西宮諒), they become friends and learn to not be embarrassed about their love of cute things.

The Sanrio Danshi group is marketed towards girls and has a character Twitter account showing depictions of their daily lives, which reached 100,000 followers within two months according to Sanrio. There are also two manga adaptations by Mai Andou, one in Sho-Comi, the other on the MangaOne app. The group received an anime adaptation in January 2018.

=== Rilu Rilu Fairilu (2016) ===
Rilu Rilu Fairilu (リルリルフェアリル) focuses on Fairilu, young fairy characters. It is the second joint multimedia project between Sanrio and Sega Toys, after Jewelpet in 2008, and followed by Beatcats in 2020. A Rilu Rilu Fairilu anime series began in 2016. Designed by Ai Setani (瀬谷愛) who also designed Kirimichan.

The Fairilu are portrayed living in the fictional realm of Little Fairilu and learning about themselves and the world around them. According to the storyline, they are born with a special item called a Fairilu Key that unlocks a corresponding door, and finding this door helps a Fairilu to mature. Fairilus are depicted as multiple species, each themed after something in the mythical or natural world, such as insects, plants, or mermaids. The most common types are Flower Fairilus, of which the primary character Lip (リップ) is descended from.

=== Marumofubiyori (2017) ===
Marumofubiyori (ja:まるもふびより) is a group of characters. Moppu is a white bear character who, according to official character profiles, got his name because he wears his blanket everywhere, trailing it behind him like a mop. He is depicted with friends including Kanikama, a toy crab that is a reliable character, and Gyoniku, a toy fish that has a mysterious antenna.

In 2017, Sanrio began streaming a series of Marumofubiyori anime shorts on YouTube. A manga titled Marumofubiyori Shirokuma Moppu no Yurufuwa Diary (まるもふびより しろくまモップのゆるふわダイアリー) was published in Ciao magazine between 2017 and 2019. A full color collection of the manga was released in 2018.

=== Mewkledreamy (2017) ===
Mewkledreamy (ミュークルドリーミー, Myūkurudorīmī) is a group of characters. The main character Mew (みゅー) is a violet stuffed toy cat, depicted wearing a pink bow. According to Sanrio's backstory, Mew gained the ability to talk to humans one night when the moonlight fell on her, and she is able to have the same dream as humans when they sleep. The characters were designed by Mayumi Yanagita (栁田真弓). An anime series based on the characters, titled Mewkledreamy premiered in 2020. The anime was made by J.C.Staff and was originally aired on TV Tokyo. A second season, titled Mewkledreamy Mix!, aired in 2021–2022. A tie-in manga adaptation began serializing in two of Kodansha's magazines, Otomodachi and Tanoshii Yōchien, in April 2020.

== 2020s ==
=== Beatcats (2020) ===
Beatcats (ビートキャッツ, Bītokyattsu) are a group of cat characters, each of a different color, that are marketed as a virtual band. They were created as a joint venture between Sanrio and Sega Toys. The third collaborative effort after Jewelpet and Rilu Rilu Fairilu, it is the first Sanrio franchise released as a musical group. They made their debut in October 2020. Their birthday is February 22.

=== Hapidanbui (2020) ===
Hapidanbui (ja:はぴだんぶい) is an all-star type group of pre-existing male Sanrio characters that were popular in the 80s and 90s. The all male group consists of Pochacco, Tuxedo Sam, Keroppi, Bad Badtz-Maru, Hangyodon and Pekkle. The name Hapidanbui is short for happī ni naritai danshitachi, bui ji kaifuku o nerau (ハッピーになりたい男子たち、V字回復をねらう), which roughly translates to "boys who want to become happy aim for a V-shaped recovery". The Hapidanbui characters went up in the Sanrio Character Rankings after Sanrio created the group and began promoting them.

In 2020, a manga series called Bokutachi Hapidanbui (ぼくたち はぴだんぶい) began in Sanrio's Strawberry Newspaper. A fanbook which includes the manga was released in 2021.

=== Bosanimal (2021) ===
Bosanimal (ja:ぼさにまる) is a group of animal characters, including species such as rabbits, birds, cats, dogs, and squirrels, who live alongside humans. The name is a combination of the word "animal" and the Japanese term "bosa bosa" which means both disheveled hair and idling time away. They were designed by the creator of Gudetama, Amy, who got the idea for the series when she read about a guide dog working with a Sanrio employee. The series has a theme of embracing diversity, working and living together despite differences, and accepting that people have days when they are a bit "bosa bosa" or dishevelled.

A children's book called Bosanimaru Bosabosa Datte ī Janai! (ぼさにまる ぼさぼさだっていいじゃない！) was published in Japan in 2021. A short anime series began on Fuji TV in April 2023. Characters in the anime include a rabbit named Sakura, voiced by Mone Kamishiraishi, a cat named Cathy, voiced by Hikolohee (ja:ヒコロヒー), and a hamster named Ran, voiced by Atsumi Tanezaki. The theme song of the series is performed by the pop band Chai.

=== JOChum (2022) ===
JOChum (ジェオチャム, Jeiōchamu) is a collective name of characters developed by Sanrio and the Japanese boy band JO1. The project was announced in June 2022 with each stage of development was shared through the group's official YouTube channel. The eleven characters were created based on drafts sketched by the group's members as their alter ego. The name JOChum is a combination of the group's name JO1 and the word "chum" which means a companion or a roommate. All characters are depicted as living in a three-story house, owned by Landlord (大家さん, Ōkasan), whose design looks like the CEO of JO1's management company, Choi Shin-hwa. JO1Chum was officially launched in November 2022.

=== Gaopowerroo (2022) ===
Gaopowerroo (ja:がおぱわるぅ) is a white dinosaur character with a pink belly, yellow horns, and heart-shaped cheeks who lives on Omurice Island with his best friend, Nezumi Piyo. Unlike most Sanrio characters, the launch of Gaopowerroo did not start with merchandise; Sanrio and co-creator Chocolate Inc. instead focused on building a following for Gaopowerroo via social media, developing his character in response to public feedback.

=== Hanamaruobake (2023) ===
Hanamaruobake (ja:はなまるおばけ), also known as Marumaru (まるまる), is a white ghost character with fluffy ears, swirly cheeks, and a hanamaru on his buttocks. According to official character profiles, he is shy, yet mysterious, appearing without warning to give someone a hanamaru for his/her daily efforts. Marumaru was created in 2022 for the Next Kawaii Project, officially debuting in 2023 upon winning the contest. His designer, Misato, was inspired by the concept of something that is always "lurking nearby", yet "healing" others' self-esteem, with a target audience of Generation Z youth.

=== Cheeristails (2026) ===
Cherristails (チアリステイルズ) is an all-bunny group of 4 pre-existing female Sanrio rabbit characters. Announced June 9, 2026, the all women group consists of Marroncream, Usahana, Wish Me Mell, and Bonbonribbon. Serving as the female counterpart to "Hapidanbui", Cherristails serves as both a band and cheerleading group. The first line of Cherristails merchandise was released September 16, 2026, followed by an official music video posted to Sanrio's official Youtube channel on September 30, 2026.

== Works cited ==
- Mana Takemura (竹村真奈) (2013). Sanrio Days Ichigo Shinbunhen (サンリオデイズ いちご新聞篇). BNN (ja:ビー・エヌ・エヌ). ISBN 9784861009020.
- 巻頭大特集 サンリオが大好き!/キキ&ララ・マイメロディ 40周年記念. MOE. Vol. 438, no. April 2016. Hakusensha. 2016.
- サンリオ60年 なかよしの絆 特別ふろく ハローキティ×ヒグチユウコ クリアファイル. MOE. No. October 2021. Hakusensha. 2021.
