= Kuromi =

Sanrio character

- Sanrio character
- Kuromi's artwork from Kuromi's Pretty Journey
- First appearance: Onegai My Melody (2005)
- Designed by: Tomoko Miyagawa; Yuko Yamaguchi
- Voiced by: English: Jenny Yokobori (Hello Kitty and Friends Supercute Adventures and My Melody & Kuromi); Diana Garnet (Kuromi's Pretty Journey); Japanese: Junko Takeuchi

In-universe information
- Species: Rabbit
- Gender: Female

Kuromi (Japanese: クロミ) is a mascot character owned by Sanrio and the darker counterpart to My Melody. She debuted in the 2005 anime series Onegai My Melody. She is presented as a rebellious character with a criminal streak and a hidden girly side. The creator of her character design is unclear, with Onegai My Melody studio Studio Comet and Sanrio having two different claims as to her designer.

== Design and conception ==
Kuromi is a female anthropomorphic rabbit with white fur, a black jester hat with a pink skull design, a pink nose, and a devil tail. She was first designed in 2005 as a rival to My Melody in the anime series Onegai My Melody. Her name was originally Urami (ウラミ).

Her personality has been described as jealous, chaotic, angry, and unpredictable, and she has no qualms about committing various acts of crime. In her original appearance, she is the leader of a biker gang. She also has a girly side, with a soft spot for pretty boys and romance novels. She was born on Halloween, 31 October.

The character designer of Kuromi is debated, with both Studio Comet artist Tomoko Miyagawa and Hello Kitty designer Yuko Yamaguchi, claiming to have been her original designer. This has led to a legal dispute between the two companies in June 2025. Studio Comet also claims that series director Makoto Moriwaki was the one to name Kuromi.

== Appearances ==
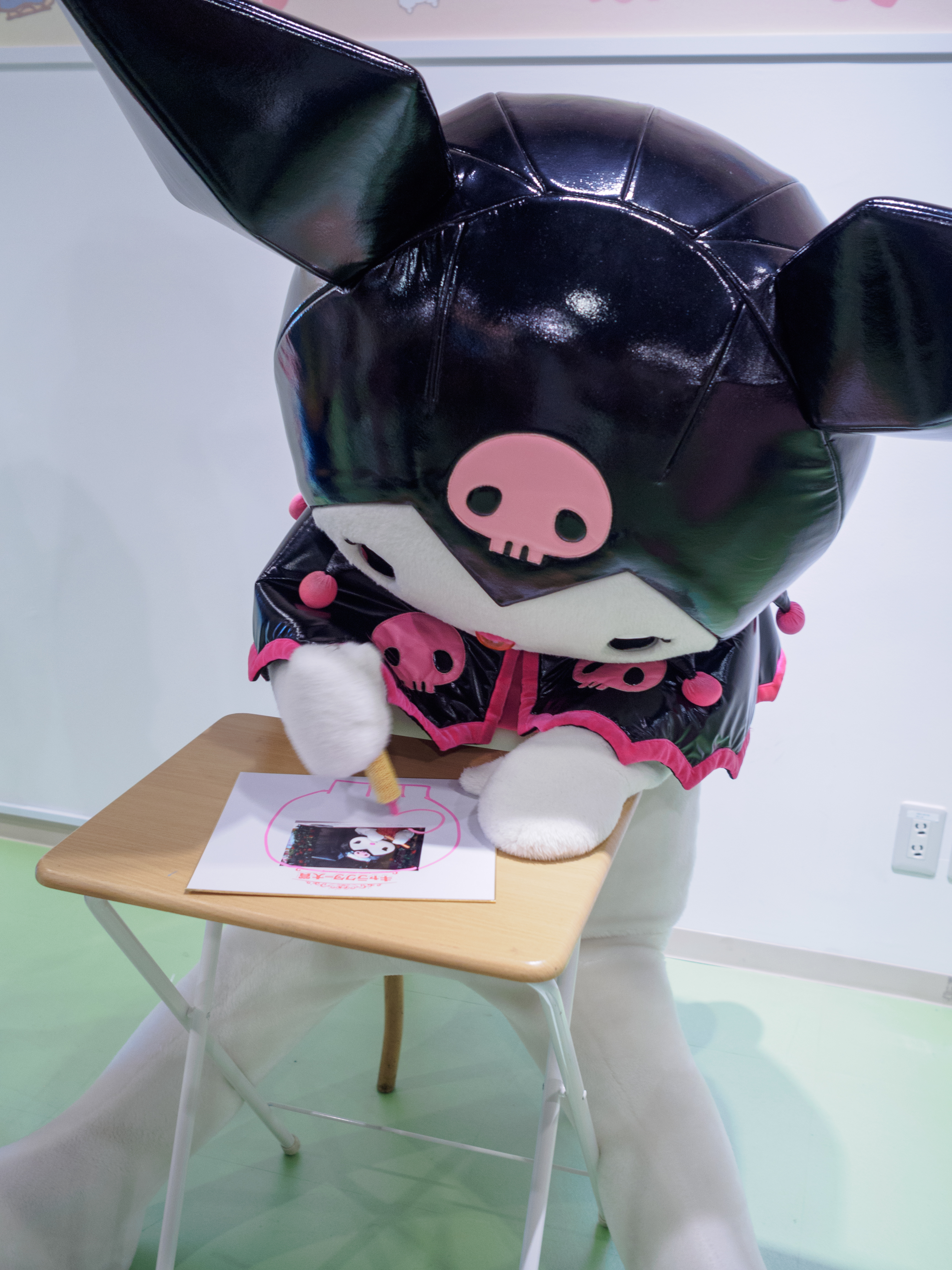
A mascot costume of Kuromi

Kuromi first appears as the primary rival character in Onegai My Melody and is one of two titular protagonists in the 2025 Netflix series My Melody & Kuromi. She is the main protagonist of the 2023 ONA Kuromi's Pretty Journey, where she searches for her older sister Romina, a brand-new character created for the show. She also appears in the video games Hello Kitty Island Adventure and Hello Kitty Online. Kuromi will appear as a playable character via downloadable content in Sonic Racing: CrossWorlds, alongside Hello Kitty and a Sanrio themed race track.

In 2021, Kuromi became a virtual idol – releasing her first single, "Greedy Greedy". To promote her musical endeavors, Sanrio launched a marketing campaign in Shibuya known as "Kuromify the World". In 2025, she would release her first EP, Kuromi In My Head. Her musical career includes collaborations with metal band Vampillia, hyperpop artist Lilbesh Ramko, Japanese rapper Daoko and Japanese singer Ado.

== Reception ==
Kuromi is one of the most popular Sanrio characters, with Patrick St. Michel of The Japan Times crediting her popularity to her "rebellious approach to kawaii". In Sanrio's Character Ranking polls, she has consistently placed above both My Melody and Hello Kitty since 2022. Reception of her design and personality has generally been positive. In Sanrio's character ranking for 2025, Kuromi ranked number 4 with 3,652,492 votes, one rank above Hello Kitty and one below Pochacco.

St. Michel says that Kuromi appeals to "younger people who see themselves at odds with regular society", noting her popularity on TikTok. Screen Rant's Hannah Diffey says that in comparison to Hello Kitty's more traditional aesthetic, Kuromi is "dynamic as she evolves with trends". In another article, she refers to the character as "My Melody's rebellious foil", calling her a hit among "Gen Z fans who gravitate toward characters with edge and personality". In her review of My Melody & Kuromi, she says Kuromi steals the show with her "mischievous edge and dry wit".

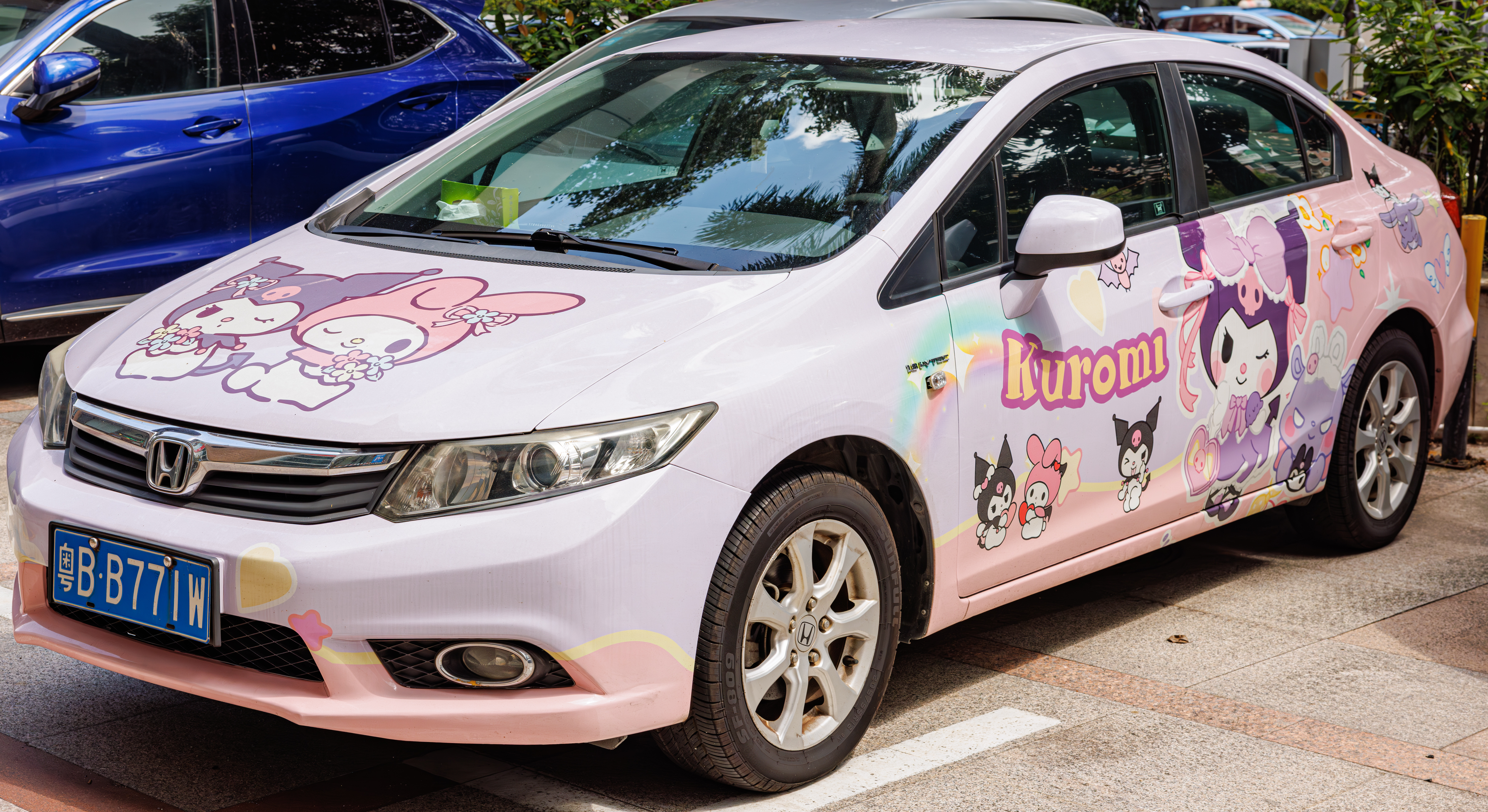
A Kuromi-themed Honda Civic in China

She is particularly popular in Greater China. In 2022, Kuromi was featured in a Douyin video that went viral in China, leading to Sanrio striking up a merchandise deal with Alibaba. Ashlyn Chak of the Hong Kong-based South China Morning Post writes that Kuromi is often seen as "something of an anti-hero" whose spunky personality is viewed as "a celebration of individuality and authenticity". An interviewee in another article is said to feel drawn to Kuromi for her "edgy, punk feel".

Kuromi's popularity has led to a fashion subculture emulating her style, known as "Kuromi-core". The style mixes dark punk aesthetics with kawaii charm, with combinations of black and pink and accessories like harnesses and chokers. It has some overlap with the established style of Gothic Lolita in Japan.
