= Nutcracker Fantasy =

- Theatrical poster for the 2014 remaster version

Japanese name
- Kanji: くるみ割り人形
Transcriptions
- Revised Hepburn: Kurumiwari Ningyō
- Directed by: Takeo Nakamura
- Written by: Shintaro Tsuji; Eugene A. Fournier; Thomas Joachim
- Based on: The Nutcracker by Pyotr Ilyich Tchaikovsky and The Nutcracker and the Mouse King by E. T. A. Hoffmann
- Produced by: Walt deFaria; Mark L. Rosen; Atsushi Tomioka; Shintaro Tsuji
- Starring: Yoko Morishita; Tetsutarō Shimizu
- Cinematography: Fumio Otani; Aguri Sugita; Ryoji Takamori
- Music by: Pyotr Ilyich Tchaikovsky
- Production company: Sanrio
- Distributed by: Sanrio
- Release dates: March 3, 1979 (Japan); July 6, 1979 (USA)
- Running time: 95 minutes
- Countries: Japan; United States
- Languages: Japanese; English

Nutcracker Fantasy (くるみ割り人形, Kurumiwari Ningyō; lit. 'The Nutcracker') is a Japanese-American stop motion animated film produced by Sanrio, very loosely based on Tchaikovsky's 1892 ballet The Nutcracker and E.T.A. Hoffmann's 1816 story "The Nutcracker and the Mouse King". It is directed by Takeo Nakamura and written by Shintaro Tsuji, Eugene A. Fournier and Thomas Joachim. It was officially released in Japan on March 3, 1979 and later in the United States on July 6, 1979. The film was nominated for the 1980 Saturn Award for Best Fantasy Film and the 1980 Young Artist Award for Best Motion Picture featuring youth and won the 1980 Young Artist Award for Best Musical Entertainment.

Nutcracker Fantasy was the first stop-motion project by Sanrio. The film's overall animation style is reminiscent of all the original Rankin/Bass "Animagic" productions, shot at Tadahito Mochinaga's MOM Production (later renamed Video Tokyo Production) in which Nakamura had previously worked for. A remastered version of the film was announced by Sanrio, with an advanced screening at the 27th Tokyo International Film Festival on October 29, 2014 and released formally in theaters on November 29, 2014 as part of Hello Kitty's 40th anniversary given the character makes a cameo appearance during the climactic musical fantasy sequence.

== Plot ==
Narrated by the adult Clara, she tells the story of Ragman, a mysterious old man who roams about the city looking into people's houses and turns children into mice if he catches them up past their bed time.

Clara is excited about her friend Fritz coming to visit the next day and refuses to go to sleep. Her Aunt Gerda tries to frighten her with stories about the Ragman, but Clara says she's too grown up to believe in him. Uncle Drosselmeyer startles them with his arrival. He gives Clara a nutcracker doll, which she adores. She promises to go to bed immediately if she can keep it.

Clara awakens in the middle of the night to find her nutcracker gone. She sees a group of mice carrying it down the stairs and follows them into the living room. As she takes back the doll, she's confronted by the leader of the mice, a two-headed rat queen. The queen orders Clara to hand over the nutcracker, but she refuses. Clara is knocked out just as the nutcracker springs to life to defend her against the mice.

The next morning, Clara finds herself back in her bedroom. She tells her aunt about the mice and her doll being missing, but Gerda insists that she is talking nonsense and is ill with a fever. In her delirious state, Clara goes down to the living room and stares at the grandfather clock. Thinking she sees Uncle Drosselmeyer inside, she climbs in, only to be scared by the Ragman.

She wanders, looking for Drosselmeyer, until she finds herself in a palace. There she sees a portrait of a girl identical to her and a glass coffin containing a sleeping mouse person. A king and a group of mourners appear, believing Clara to be their Princess Mary returned. After Clara corrects their mistake, King Goodwin explains that she's in the Doll Kingdom. They were at war with the mice, led by the two-headed queen Morphia. When defeat seemed inevitable, the dolls surrendered. However, the King refused to agree to Morphia's final term: Princess Mary must marry her son, Gaar. As punishment for refusing, Morphia cursed the princess to look like a hideous mouse and lie in sleep until King Goodwin agrees to the marriage.

King Goodwin gathers all the world's wise men in hopes they can find a way to break the curse, but all their ideas are far fetched and illogical, and an argument quickly breaks out between them. Despairing that no one knows how to help, Clara leaves the castle and wanders the streets. A street singer points her in the direction of The Queen of Time, who is known for having the answer to everything. Clara goes to her and asks if she knows how to save the princess and defeat Morphia. The Queen of Time uses her magical crystal ball to spy on Morphia, revealing the only way to save the princess is to destroy the queen's source of power, the Nut of Darkness. This can only be done if the magical Sword of Pearl is wielded by someone with a pure heart. The Queen of Time provides the sword, but it's up to Clara to find someone to carry it into battle.

Clara returns to the castle, believing Franz, the captain of the guard, has a pure enough heart. She tells him what he must do in order to save the princess. King Goodwin promises Franz his daughter's hand in marriage if he's successful, and Franz leads the doll army off to battle. They arrive as the mice are celebrating Gaar's eminent marriage to the princess. Just as it seems the toy soldiers are losing, Franz destroys The Nut of Darkness and kills Morphia - but not before she places a curse on him, turning him into a nutcracker doll.

Clara carries the Nutcracker back to the palace, where she finds the court and King Goodwin are celebrating Princess Mary's awakening. Seeing Franz's new state, the princess abandons the marriage promise and calls the Nutcracker ugly. Clara leaves the kingdom to wander in search of anyone who knows how to return Franz to human, unaware that Gaar survived the attack and is following her. She eventually comes across the Watchmaker, who tells her the only way to save Franz is through an act of true, unselfish love. Clara declares she loves Franz, but the Watchmaker says that isn't enough.

Exhausted from travelling, Clara falls asleep. She dreams that Franz is human again and they enter a magical kingdom made of candy. As they're about to ascend the stairs to live happily ever after in their castle, Clara's foot becomes stuck. Franz continues without her, leading Clara to grab his foot and beg him not to go. She wakes up to realize she's clutching the Nutcracker as Gaar tries to pull him away. She begs Gaar to spare Franz and kill her instead, but Gaar insists Franz must die for killing his mother. As he's about to stab the Nutcracker, Clara uses her own body as a shield. This frees Franz from the spell and destroys Gaar.

Clara wakes up in bed, with Uncle Drosselmeyer beside her. As Clara is recounting what happened and trying to ask Drosselmeyer what he was doing in the clock, Aunt Gerda comes in to say Fritz has arrived. He comes in, identical to Franz. Older Clara narrates that she and Fritz lived happily ever after.

== Voice Cast (in order of appearance) ==
Character	Japanese		English
Character	Original	Remeastered	English
Clara	Kaoru Sugita	Kasumi Arimura	Melissa Gilbert
Aunt Gerda	Shizue Natsukawa	Saori Yuki	Lurene Tuttle
Uncle Drosselmeyer	Kō Nishimura	Masachika Ichimura	Christopher Lee
Street Singer	Kō Nishimura	Masachika Ichimura	Christopher Lee
The Puppeteer	Kō Nishimura	Masachika Ichimura	Christopher Lee
The Watchmaker	Kō Nishimura	Masachika Ichimura	Christopher Lee
Queen Morphia	Atsuko Ichinomiya	Ryōko Hirosue	Jo Anne Worley
Chamberlain	Hisao Dazai	Hisao Dazai	Ken Sansom
The Poet Wiseman	Shuichiro Moriyama	Shuichiro Moriyama	Ken Sansom
King Goodwin	Kiiton Masuda	Kiiton Masuda	Dick Van Patten
Franz/Fritz	Taro Shigaki	Tori Matsuzaka	Roddy McDowall
The Indian Wiseman	Shunji Fujimura	Shunji Fujimura	Mitchel Gardener
The Viking Wiseman	Hiroshi Tamaoki	Hiroshi Tamaoki	Mitchel Gardener
The Chinese Wiseman	Jirō Sakagami	Jirō Sakagami	Jack Angel
The Executioner	Kinya Aikawa	Kinya Aikawa	Jack Angel
Gar Morphia	Takao Yamada	Takao Yamada	Jack Angel
Otto Von'Atra	Ichiyō Itō	Ichiyō Itō	Gene Moss
The French Wiseman	Arihiro Fujimura	Arihiro Fujimura	Gene Moss
Clovis	Shinji Maki	Shinji Maki	Gene Moss
Queen of Time	Haruko Kitahama	Haruko Kitahama	Eva Gabor
Princess Mary	Yukari Uehara	Yukari Uehara	Robin Haffner

=== Additional English Voices ===
- Michele Lee (Narrator)
- Joan Gerber (Mice)
- Maxine Fisher (Mice)

== Remake ==
A remastered version of the film was greenlit by Sanrio on August 1, 2014 and was released on November 29, 2014 as part of Hello Kitty's 40th anniversary. Sebastian Masuda, the illustrator to Kyary Pamyu Pamyu's official albums, was in charge of directing the film while Kasumi Arimura voiced the film's lead character, Clara.

The remake film's theme song is a newly remixed version of Kyary Pamyu Pamyu's song Oyasumi, composed by Yasutaka Nakata of Capsule.

== Home media ==
Discotek Media released the movie to Region 1 DVD in both its English and original Japanese versions on August 29, 2017. A Blu-ray, featuring a new transfer and a restoration of the English dub, was released on November 26, 2019.

== See also ==
- Rankin/Bass Animated Entertainment
- 1979 in film
- Kihachirō Kawamoto, anime stop-motion animator
