= Jewelpet =

Media franchise

- The official logo for the Jewelpet franchise in Japan
- Created by: Sanrio; Sega Toys
- Original work: Sanrio Toys

Print publications
- Novel(s): Jewelpet: The Fuss in the Jewel Festival!? (2012)

Films and television
- Film(s): Jewelpet the Movie: Sweets Dance Princess (2012); Jewelpet Attack Travel! (2022)
- Television series: Jewelpet (2009); Jewelpet Twinkle☆ (2010); Jewelpet Sunshine (2011); Jewelpet Kira☆Deco (2012); Jewelpet Happiness (2013); Lady Jewelpet (2014); Jewelpet: Magical Change (2015)

Audio
- Soundtrack(s): Jewelpet: Happy Music (2010); Jewelpet Twinkle☆: Happy Happy Music (2010); Jewelpet: Kirapika☆Song (2010); Jewelpet Sunshine: Happyx3 Music (2011); Jewelpet The Movie: Sweets Dance Princess Soundtrack (2012)
- Original music: See List of Jewelpet soundtracks

Miscellaneous
- Toy(s): Various (including plushes)
- Producer: Yuko Yamaguchi
- Original artwork by: Miyuki Okumura
- Official Website: http://jewelpet.info/

Jewelpet (Japanese: ジュエルペット, Hepburn: Juerupetto) is a Japanese media franchise and toy line created in 2008 as a joint venture between Sanrio and Sega Toys, produced by the third character designer of Hello Kitty, Yuko Yamaguchi and illustrated by the character designer of Cinnamoroll, Miyuki Okumura. The franchise was originally launched on January 15, 2008, focusing on animals named after jewels, birthstones and minerals, who can use magic using their eyes.

Due to its success, Sanrio and Sega Toys expanded the Jewelpet franchise overseas. The franchise is currently being licensed by Italian company Giochi Preziosi for its European release.

The official slogan is "Eyes of Jewel that Shine, glittering with Luck and Good Fortune".

== Story ==
In an antique shop, there was a magical Jewel Box which sat there for centuries and shined in very bright colors. A girl accidentally encountered the box and opened it, causing a strange light to shine and the girl was sucked inside. She was now in a strange new world that shined like jewels. A sign read 'Jewel Land'. The girl was amazed, as everything shone in bright colors and was decorated in all kinds of jewels. At the center of the town, there was a strange tower, also decorated with magical jewels. She went to the tower and went inside.

The girl was greeted by a princess and was happy to see her as she offered her a jewel apple. The girl accepted the gift and the jewel in the girl's hand glowed, magically transforming into a cute animal. The princess said the creature was called a Jewelpet, and each of them live in Jewel Land. However, she also told her the crisis that Jewel Land was facing as the magic was starting to vanish. She told the girl that she must raise that Jewelpet she had into a full-fledged magician.

Each Jewelpet differs from their magical Jewel Eyes and depends on the human partner who awakens them and use magic whenever they need to. They all study magic along with their partners in a special school in Jewel Land for them to become master magicians. The pets and their partners must endure a lot of hardships and even trouble. With each care the human partners give to their Jewelpets, the pets love them back.

For a Jewelpet to become a magician, it must go through rigorous training and studying with their human partners to prevent the crisis in Jewel Land. If the Jewelpet becomes a magician, they'll be rewarded with a magical Jewel Cloak, as a symbol of mastery over its magic.

== History ==
The Jewelpet franchise debuted on January 15, 2008 as the first collaborative project between Sanrio and Sega Toys. The franchise originally started off with 33 characters, each of them being best sellers during the summer of that year with each toy having internet connectivity capabilities using special passwords. As Jewelpet entered its first year in 2009, the first season of the anime series of the same name premiered.

In February 2010, 600 items of merchandise were all made with over 25 licensed companies for its overseas and domestic expansion. On March 11, 2010, the 34th Jewelpet, Labra, officially debuted. The characters made their official debut as meet able characters in Sanrio Puroland with their first two shows: Throbbing Jewelpet! Magical☆March (ジュエルペットのどきどき!マジカル☆マーチ, Juerupetto no dokidoki! Majikaru ☆ māchi) and Jewelpet and Cinnamon's Future Revolution! (ジュエルペットとシナモンのみらいレボリューション!, Juerupetto to shinamon nomi rai reboryūshon!). In addition, after the characters debuted in Puroland, visitors increased by 17% during the fourth quarter of 2010.

In December 2010, three new Jewelpets officially debuted: Angela, Charotte and Jasper. Charotte and Jasper were both winners of a Jewelpet Design Contest that was held during the airing of Jewelpet Twinkle. In 2011, the Webgurumi website was closed down and was replaced by a new website: Jewel Land Online. In December of that same year, the character Sakuran made its official debut alongside 11 new characters in a new subline called Sweetspets. Sakuran herself is also a winner of the new character design contest that was held during the airing of Jewelpet Sunshine.

On March 31, 2012, two new male Jewelpets debuted: Coal and Granite. Jewel Land Online ended its service that date as well. In June 2012, the Puroland show Jewelpet Kira☆Deco! Musical (ジュエルペット きら☆デコッ!ミュージカル, Juerupetto kira ☆ deko! Myūjikaru) opened in conjunction with the Jewelpet Kira☆Deco! TV series. In August 2012, its first official theatrical film was released in Japanese cinemas with the introduction of the 13th Sweetspet, Gumimin. However, the film proved to be a failure at the box office.

In the January 2013 Issue of Pucchigumi magazine, the 40th Jewelpet, Rossa was officially revealed. In 2014, the 41st Jewelpet, Luea, was also revealed and in the November 2014 issue of Youchien, marked the debut of the 42nd character Larimar. In 2016, the musicals based on Jewelpet ended its run.

As of July 2017, the characters were removed in Sanrio Puroland's catalog of meet of greet characters due to rising popularity of the Rilu Rilu Fairilu Anime series. Japanese netizens expressed their concerns over the issue as the indoor park's representatives stated that the popularity of the new series has caused for the characters to be removed from the lineup.

The franchise officially celebrated its 10th anniversary in 2019 with the re-release of all 7 anime series in YouTube in a limited time basis alongside a new stage show in the 2019 Tokyo Toy Show.

== Media ==
=== Toys ===
Sega Toys collaborated with Sanrio to release a line of plush toys on January 15, 2008. Each plush Jewelpet contains a password to access the Web-Gurumi website, a special site in which the customer "adopts" this pet in the virtual world. If the user doesn't have the password, the user may not get access to the website. Accounts expire within one year, unless another Jewelpet toy is bought, and that animal is added to the user account. With the expansion of the series, toy replicas of the Jewel Stick, Jewel Charms, Jewel Pocketbook and Jewel Pods from the anime series were made as well.

=== Merchandise ===
As with other Sanrio character franchises such as Hello Kitty, My Melody, Sugarbunnies and Cinnamoroll, Jewelpet merchandise mostly consists of stationery, school supplies, bags, raincoats, umbrellas, bento boxes and even toy replicas of the Jewel Stick and Jewel Pocketbook from the anime series. Merchandise was released by Sanrio, Sega and Bandai, among other companies. The popularity of the series then expanded overseas in Hong Kong, South Korea and Europe.

A Trading Card Game spinoff was also released by Bushiroad, the creators of the Weiß Schwarz, Alice X Cross and Cardfight!! Vanguard Trading Card Games. Both the starter set and booster packs were released on July 30, 2009. and was later discontinued in 2010. Also several Jewelpet characters were also released as stickers for the instant messaging software LINE.

=== Anime ===
An anime adaptation of the Jewelpet franchise was produced by Studio Comet and premiered on April 5, 2009, on TV Osaka and TV Tokyo, replacing Onegai My Melody Kirara in its initial timeslot. A spin-off, titled Jewelpet Twinkle (ジュエルペット てぃんくる☆, Juerupetto Tinkuru☆) began airing on TV Tokyo between April 3, 2010 and April 2, 2011. A third installment, titled Jewelpet Sunshine (ジュエルペット サンシャイン, Juerupetto Sanshain) premiered on April 9, 2011. A fourth series titled Jewelpet Kira Deco! (ジュエルペット きら☆デコッ！, Juerupetto Kira☆deko!) was released on April 7, 2012 and ended on March 30, 2013. A fifth installment titled Jewelpet Happiness (ジュエルペット ハッピネス, Juerupetto Happinesu) was first revealed on the March Issue of Pucchigumi and premiered on April 6, 2013 and ended on March 29, 2014.

The sixth installment, Lady Jewelpet (レディジュエルペット, Redi Juerupetto) was announced by Sanrio via the official Anime Twitter account and aired from April 5, 2014, until March 28, 2015. Jewelpet: Magical Change (ジュエルペット マジカルチェンジ, Juerupetto Majikaru Chenji) was revealed in the 2015 Winter Wonder Festival and later in the March 2015 issue of Pucchigumi.

=== Movie ===
A feature-length movie titled Jewelpet the Movie: Sweets Dance Princess (映画ジュエルペット スウィーツダンスプリンセス, Eiga Juerupetto: Suwītsu Dansu Purinsesu), was directed by Hiroaki Sakurai (Daa! Daa! Daa!, Cromartie High School) and produced by Studio Comet and Toho. It was released on August 11, 2012, and was a box-office flop

=== Books ===
Cover art of the Tsubasa Bunko novel Jewelpet: The Fuss in the Jewel Festival!?, featuring the main Jewelpets and the novel exclusive character Lollip.

Official Storybooks and Reference Books were also issued by Shogakukan during the series's release each year. Two manga spinoffs were also created, and each were published during the airing of the anime series. The first one was serialized in the Shōjo Magazine Pucchigumi with illustrations by Mako Morie in 2009. The first series ended in the same year. On December 28, 2009, a second manga was then serialized in the Shōjo Magazine Ciao with illustrations and story by Sayuri Tatsuyama under Sanrio and Sega Toys' permission. The manga ran from February 2010 to September 2010.

An official light novel titled Jewelpet: The Fuss in the Jewel Festival!? (ジュエルペット: ジュエルフェスティバルはおおさわぎ!?, Juerupetto: Juerufesutibaru wa ōsawagi!?) was released as part of Kadokawa's Tsubasa Bunko Children's Light Novels on May 11, 2012, written by Hiroko Kanasugi and illustrated by POP. It introduces an exclusive character to the story, a "Jewelpet" named Lolip (ロリップ, Rorippu) and the story revolves around her experiences and bond with Ruby and her friends while setting up the Jewel Festival in Jewel Land.

An official guide book to commemorate the third series was also published by Yousensha, titled Jewelpet Sunshine FANBOOK (ジュエルペット サンシャインFANBOOK, Juerupetto Sanshain FANBOOK). The book is part of the Otoma Anime Collection books and contains character profiles, a story outline, an introduction to the world of Jewelpet, a listing of songs used in the series and interviews from both the cast and staff members of the series. The book was published on June 2, 2012.

=== Games ===
Seven video games were also made to tie in with the toy and anime franchises, three were for the Nintendo DS, three for the Nintendo 3DS and one for the video game arcades in Japan.

=== Events ===
Several musicals were held in Sanrio Puroland and Sanrio Harmonyland, featuring several of the Jewelpets: Ruby, Sapphie, Garnet, Labra, Angela, Charlotte, Jasper and Rosa. Ruby is a mascot costume at Puroland. Some of the musicals also feature other Sanrio characters. A musical based on the Kira Deco arc of the anime premiered in Japan in June 2012.

== Reception ==
Jewelpet ranked 3rd place in the Bandai Child Questionnaire in June 2010, due to its popularity with children aged 6 to 8 years old and older females alike. The Character franchise is also one of the top 15 highly voted Sanrio Character Franchise in the 26th Sanrio Character Ranking in 2011, ranking into 14th place. It became the 6th highly voted Character Franchise in both the 27th and 28th Sanrio Character Ranking.

The first Jewelpet anime ranked 7th in the Kanto Video Research, from December 27, 2009 to January 3, 2010 after airing Episodes 39 and 40. Its sequel has received critical acclaim from fans and critics, making the first Sanrio funded anime to appeal in all demographics. The series' main character, Akari Sakura is also ranked 6th in Megahouse's Excellent Model Series 10th Anniversary poll.

In the press release by Sega Toys on October 1, 2012, the Jewel Pod Diamond sold about 160,000 units in less than two months since its release and topped the charts as the most sold girl's toy in Japan. The company had the target sales of 400,000 by the end of the year and had a combined total of 700,000 units sold on all three Jewel Pods.

== See also ==
- Rilu Rilu Fairilu and Beatcats - The second and third Character Franchises created in conjunction with Sega Sammy Holdings and Sanrio.
