= Shintaro Tsuji =

Japanese businessman, founder of Sanrio

- 辻 信太郎
- Born: December 7, 1927 (age 98); Kōfu, Yamanashi Prefecture, Japan
- Education: Kiryu Technical College
- Occupation: President of Sanrio (1960–2020)
- Children: Kunihiko Tsuji

Shintaro Tsuji (辻 信太郎, Tsuji Shintarō; born December 7, 1927) is a Japanese entrepreneur and former civil servant. He is the founder and former-president of Sanrio, a merchandise company known for its characters, including Hello Kitty.

== Biography ==
=== Early life ===
Shintaro Tsuji was born in Kofu, Yamanashi Prefecture, to a manageress of three ryokan. He was a student of a kindergarten affiliated with the Toyo Eiwa Jogakuin. As part of a wealthy family belonging to the Saegusa clan, Tsuji, as their first child, lived a life of luxury, yet he was secluded. When his mother died of leukemia, Tsuji was under the care of his abusive aunt. From 1945 to 1947, Tsuji studied chemical engineering at Kiryu Technical College (now a part of Gunma University); at that time, he also practiced manufacturing, and he would later take advantage of the post-World War II shortage situation in the country by creating goods for the black market—an act that formed the basis of his entrepreneurial career.

=== Government tenure ===
In 1949, Tsuji started working for the government of Yamanashi Prefecture, at the urging of his relatives. He first worked in a job Tsuji described as his "second adversity after his boyhood", before becoming a teacher, and later (under the request of Hisashi Amano, then-governor of Yamanashi Prefecture), a commerce worker. He would later leave the government in 1960, but not before being almost involved in a slander campaign against Amano's opponents.

=== As founder of Sanrio ===
On August 10, 1960, with ¥1,000,000 in capital, (Note: At least ¥200,000 of the capital came from then re-elected governor Amano, the then vice-governor of Yamanashi Prefecture, and other friends and colleagues of Tsuji, while the rest came from his government pension, severance pay, and personal savings.) Tsuji founded Yamanashi Silk Center, a textile company that would eventually become Sanrio in 1973. As part of his work at Sanrio, every month, Tsuji would write a message under his alter ego, The Strawberry King, to be published in each issue of Sanrio's magazine, the Strawberry Newspaper. In 2020, Tsuji stepped down as president of Sanrio, and was succeeded by his grandson, Tomokuni. On April 3, 2026, the Yamanashi Strawberry King Museum in Kai, Yamanashi opened, with one exhibition hall dedicated to Tsuji's life and work on Sanrio.

== Personal life ==
Tsuji married Yasuko in the 1950s. He is the father of Kunihiko Tsuji (who was at one point the heir of Sanrio before his death in 2013) and the grandfather of Tomokuni Tsuji (the current president of Sanrio and the youngest CEO of a TOPIX-listed company), who coincidentally has the same birthday as Hello Kitty. Tsuji had an interest in Greek mythology, owing to his time with his aunt.

During his college years, Tsuji contracted tuberculosis, and had to recover in his family home for several months. As president of Sanrio, he also thought of committing suicide at one point, but he ended up wanting to live upon undergoing polypectomy.

== Works ==
=== Filmography (selected) ===
Year	Title	Notes	Ref.
1977	The Extraordinary Adventures of the Mouse and His Child		
1977	Who Are the DeBolts? And Where Did They Get Nineteen Kids?		
1979	The Glacier Fox		
1979	Nutcracker Fantasy	Adaptation of E. T. A. Hoffmann's The Nutcracker and the Mouse King	
1981	The Sea Prince and the Fire Child		
1985	A Journey Through Fairyland		
2007	Nezumi Monogatari: George and Gerald's Adventure		

=== Bibliography ===
As a book author, he had written more than a dozen books, ranging from fairy tales to business.

Year	Title
2000	These are Sanrio's Secrets
