= Strawberry Newspaper =

Japanese Sanrio magazine

Cover of the March 2025 issue, featuring Cinnamoroll

The Strawberry Newspaper (いちご新聞, Ichigo Shimbun), also known as the Strawberry News, is a Japanese monthly magazine published by Sanrio. It was first published in 1975 and is aimed at children, primarily girls. It contains news on Sanrio's products and characters, the most well-known of which is Hello Kitty. The magazine is published in a large size tabloid format and printed in full color. It has been in continuous publication since 1975, and as of 2019 six hundred issues had been published, and according to Sanrio, each new issue was printed in 100,000 copies. The first issue of the magazine was published in April 1975, had the American dog character Snoopy on the cover and cost 100 yen. As of 2025, the cost per issue is 220 yen. Originally, the magazine was published twice a month, but it shifted over to once a month in 1982.

Aside from news, the magazine includes various contents that tie-in to Sanrio characters, like stories and activities. There are arts and crafts, including step-by-step instructions for how to draw the characters or do origami, as well as papercraft like gift boxes, miniature books and paper dolls printed in the magazine to cut out and construct. There have also been instructions for how to do magic tricks, and also board games and card games to cut out and play. Older issues also had sheet music for character songs and step-by-step instructions for doing dances inspired by the characters. It regularly includes recipes for making food and desserts in the image of Sanrio's characters. The back of the magazine is sometimes printed in a pattern with Sanrio's characters, and can be cut out and used as wrapping paper or a book cover. Each issue includes a poster and comes with a bonus item, typically a simple accessory or stationery.

Every issue includes a message (similar to an editorial) from The Strawberry King, the alter-ego of Sanrio founder Shintaro Tsuji. Some of the messages are political, and as of 2016, in every August issue, Tsuji had written about his memories of World War II, including how he lost classmates when he was in college. In 2015, on the 70th anniversary of the Surrender of Japan, it had a pacifist message, where Sanrio characters discuss contemporary military conflicts, including Hello Kitty mentioning Afghanistan, Somalia, and Ukraine, and My Melody talking about the Islamic State in Syria.

The Strawberry Newspaper has published manga with several different Sanrio characters, including Minna no Tabo from 1986 to 1987, Pekkle beginning in 1991, and Hapidanbui beginning in 2020. Kuririn Diary (クリリン日記, Kuririn Nikki) from the late 1990s with hamster character Corocorokuririn blends reality and fiction by including photographs of real hamsters with drawings of fictional characters. Mariland Stories (マリーランドストーリー) features My Melody and was first published in the Strawberry Newspaper before being published as a book in 2025. Beginning in 1980, stories and illustrations from the writer and illustrator Milk Aoyama (青山みるく) have been published regularly in the Strawberry News.

The readers of the Strawberry Newspaper are referred to as Strawberry Mates (いちごメイト, Ichigo Meito). Sanrio used to hold monthly gatherings for Strawberry Mates at their Strawberry House (ja:いちごのお家) store in Tokyo. Several characters, beginning with the Little Twin Stars characters Kiki and Lala in 1975, were named by readers of the magazine. Sanrio printed a request for readers to send in their ideas for names, and names were then picked from the reader suggestions. Other characters named this way include Goropikadon and My Melody's companion character My Sweet Piano. The character Corocorokuririn and his family were modelled on real life hamsters that were kept at the office of Sanrio. New owners for the real life hamster offspring were solicited from among readers of the Strawberry Newspaper, who also coined some of the names used for the fictional hamster children.

The annual Sanrio Character Rankings poll, where fans can vote on their favorite characters, began in the Strawberry Newspaper in 1986. A precursor, the Sanrio Character Popularity Contest, began in 1975 and ran for about six years.

== Works cited ==
- Mana Takemura (竹村真奈) (2013). Sanrio Days Ichigo Shinbunhen (サンリオデイズ いちご新聞篇). BNN (ja:ビー・エヌ・エヌ). ISBN 9784861009020.
- 巻頭大特集 サンリオが大好き!/キキ&ララ・マイメロディ 40周年記念. MOE. Vol. 438, no. April 2016. Hakusensha. 2016.
