= Miyuki Okumura =

Japanese artist

Miyuki Okumura (奥村 心雪, Okumura Miyuki) is a character artist and manga artist from Saitama Prefecture. She is well known as the character illustrator and artist for Sanrio's Cinnamoroll and Jewelpet franchises.

== Biography ==
Miyuki Okumura was born in Saitama Prefecture and attended Fukuoka Central High School. After she graduated, she attended college at the Joshibi Junior College and graduated with a degree in design. She then joined Sanrio after doing the official character art for the Cinnamoroll franchise and became well known after its release. In 2008, she and Yuko Yamaguchi worked together and illustrated the characters of the Jewelpet franchise in 2008. In 2010, Okumura also did the character design for Wish Me Mell series.

On November 10, 2024, Okumura announced on X that she has left Sanrio after working there for 25 years.
