= Hello Kitty Island Adventure =

2023 video game

- App icon
- Developer: Sunblink
- Publisher: Sunblink
- Platforms: iOS; macOS; Apple TV; Nintendo Switch; Nintendo Switch 2; PlayStation 5; Windows
- Release: iOS, macOS, Apple TV; July 28, 2023; Nintendo Switch, Windows; January 30, 2025; PlayStation 5; August 5, 2025; Nintendo Switch 2; November 13, 2025
- Genres: Adventure, platformer, life simulation
- Modes: Single-player, multiplayer

Hello Kitty Island Adventure is a 2023 life simulation video game. Based on the Hello Kitty brand, it was released for Apple Arcade on July 28, 2023. Ports for Windows, Nintendo Switch, Nintendo Switch 2, and PlayStation 5 were released in 2025.

== Gameplay ==
Hello Kitty Island Adventure takes place on an island inhabited by Sanrio characters. The gameplay involves adventuring, collecting items, and puzzle solving, with new quests being added regularly. Many of these quests are unlocked by gradually becoming better friends with the Sanrio characters through gifting them items daily. Additional gameplay features include fishing, house furnishing, and photographing Gudetama. The game is intended to be played daily, with certain gameplay mechanics such as gifting character items being limited. These limits refresh everyday in real time.

At launch, the game included 18 Sanrio characters, most of which being well known characters appearing in the Sanrio Character Rankings like Hello Kitty, Kuromi, and Cinnamoroll. Other main characters include Tophat, an original character created for the game, and Big Challenges, an obscure crocodile character created by Sanrio in 1978 who previously had minimal backstory and no media appearances. More minor characters, such as Dear Daniel, are classified as Island Visitors who can permanently move into player-decorated homes by completing quests.

Hello Kitty Island Adventure is a live service game, with additional characters, in-game locations, and gameplay mechanics such as flower gardening being added in regular post-launch updates. These updates also include seasonal time-gated content which unlock new furniture and clothing.

== Development ==
Hello Kitty Island Adventure was developed by Boulder, Colorado-based game studio Sunblink Entertainment. In an interview with TouchArcade, two of the employees, Chelsea Howe and Tom Blind, stated that they wanted a game that combined cozy simulators such as Animal Crossing with more exploration-based gameplay.

Critics and fans noted that the game shares its name with a fictional one mentioned in the 2006 South Park episode "Make Love, Not Warcraft", which became an Internet meme used as shorthand to refer to casual games. Sanrio later used the meme in practical jokes. However, a marketing executive at Sanrio stated there was no association or tie-in to South Park.

== Release ==
The original game was released on July 28, 2023, as an Apple Arcade exclusive. In the June 2024 Nintendo Direct, ports for Nintendo Switch and Windows were announced, set to be released in 2025. These versions were released on January 30, 2025, and a port for PlayStation 5 was released on August 5, 2025. Physical editions for Nintendo Switch and Playstation 5 were released on August 29, 2025. A version for Nintendo Switch 2 was released on November 13, 2025. A version for PlayStation 4 was announced in 2024, but has yet to be released.

The Apple Arcade edition is updated more frequently than other versions of the game, with some content in the Apple Arcade edition being released as paid downloadable content for other versions. The first DLC, Wheatflour Wonderland, released in September 2025, adds the in-game location of the same name and characters such as Cogimyun. The second DLC, City Town, released in April 2026, adds the in-game location of the same name and characters such as Usahana. A third DLC, Tea Garden, was released in August 2026 and adds a new section to the Merry Meadows map, as well as several new items, costumes, and quests.

== Reception ==
According to review aggregator Metacritic, the game received "generally favorable" reviews based on 19 reviews.

=== Sales ===
In 2023, Hello Kitty Island Adventure was the seventh most-downloaded title on Apple Arcade. The following year, it became the third most-downloaded game on the service. In March 2025, Sunblink announced that more than 500,000 copies of the game had been sold within 30 days of its release on Nintendo Switch and Windows on January 30. It was the sixth-most downloaded title on Apple Arcade in 2025.

=== Awards ===
Hello Kitty Island Adventure was awarded Apple Arcade Game of the Year at the 2023 App Store Awards. It has also won the fan-voted Webby People's Voice Award in 2024 and 2026. It was nominated for Best Mobile Game at The Game Awards 2023, as well as Mobile Game of the Year and Family Game of the Year at the 27th Annual D.I.C.E. Awards.
