= My Melody & Kuromi =

Japanese anime television series

- Promotional poster

マイメロディとクロミ (Mai Merodi to Kuromi)
- Genre: Slice of life
- Created by: Sanrio
- Original net animation
- Directed by: Tomoki Misato
- Written by: Shuko Nemoto
- Music by: Yutaka Yamada
- Studio: Toruku from Wit Studio
- Licensed by: Netflix
- Released: July 24, 2025
- Runtime: 11–17 minutes
- Episodes: 12
- Related anime
- Onegai My Melody; Kuromi's Pretty Journey

My Melody & Kuromi (Japanese: マイメロディとクロミ, Hepburn: Maimerodi to Kuromi) is a Japanese stop motion original net animation (ONA) based on the Sanrio characters My Melody and Kuromi. Produced by Toruku from Wit Studio, the series was released worldwide on July 24, 2025, on Netflix.

== Synopsis ==
My Melody opens a cake shop in Mariland. After encountering a magical heart in the forest, strange things start happening around her. Meanwhile, Kuromi's Japanese sweets shop across the street is always empty. Kuromi searches for the secret to My Melody's cakes. My Melody and Kuromi work hard to prepare for a sweets-making contest judged by the world-famous pastry chef Pistachio. However, no one knows that this will lead to an incident that threatens the fate of Mariland.

== Characters ==
=== Main characters ===
My Melody (マイメロディ, Mai Melodi)
Voiced by: Rei Sakuma (Japanese); Michelle Marie (English)
One of the two main titular protagonists, My Melody is an optimistic pink-hooded white rabbit who likes almond pound cake.
Kuromi (クロミ)
Voiced by: Junko Takeuchi (Japanese); Jenny Yokobori (English)
A black jester-hooded rabbit, My Melody's self-proclaimed rival/friend and one of the main protagonists who likes pickled onions.
Flat (フラット, Furatto)
Voiced by: Megumi Han (Japanese); Risa Mei (English)
A small blue mouse and one of My Melody's friends in Mariland.
My Sweet Piano (マイスウィートピアノ, Mai Su~ito Piano)
Voiced by: Junko Takeuchi (Japanese); Brenna Larsen (English)
A pink sheep and My Melody's best friend who is mute and only says "Baa" until she speaks in one of the last episodes.
Pistachio (ピスタチオ, Pisutachio)
Voiced by: Kenji Nojima (Japanese); Griffin Burns (English)
A green cat who is a world-famous pastry chef and the judge for Mariland's sweets-making contest.
Tanba (タンバ; Voiced by: Taku Yashiro (Japanese); Griffin Burns (English)) and Sasage (ササゲ; Voiced by: Gakuto Kajiwara (Japanese); Zach Aguilar (English))
Tanba and Sasage are two wolves who help Kuromi at her Japanese sweets shop and are eager to find the Heart.
Baku (バク)
Voiced by: Noboru Maeda (Japanese); Bryce Papenbrook (English)
Baku is a purple tapir with the ability to fly and Kuromi's usual sidekick. Despite being mentioned by Kuromi, he is absent throughout the series, but later returns to Mariland in the final episode.

== Production ==
In January 2025, Netflix announced a new stop-motion anime series that was directed by Tomoki Misato and written by Shuko Nemoto. Produced by Toruku Studio (a division of Wit Studio, who are known for Spy × Family), the show has a "hand-crafted" and Kawaii aesthetic. The series' theme song, titled "Kawaii", is performed by Le Sserafim and produced by Gen Hoshino.

== Episodes ==
No.	Title	Original release date
1	"What's This? My Heart is Pounding"	July 24, 2025
My Melody helps Flat to prepare for Harinezume's birthday and discovers that music makes strawberries sweet. Meanwhile, Kuromi gets jealous of My Melody's success as her sweet shop struggles and wonders how to improve hers. Wanting to discover My Melody's secrets, Kuromi takes her and Flat to the market, then gets the idea to steal strawberries. My Melody and Flat make a celery smoothie, which helps Flat feel better despite his hatred of celery. Realizing that her strawberries are missing, My Melody goes to the forest to find more, only to get lost. Hearing the sound of a heartbeat, My Melody discovers a tree and falls inside, where she finds the glowing heart from her dream. My Melody touches it and feels her heartbeat, but collapses. Upon waking up, My Melody finds herself in the candy land from her dream.
2	"Fluffy and Soft"	July 24, 2025
My Melody wanders into the magical Cloud Kingdom where she has a strange encounter with a fluffy bear. Back home, Flat convinces her to participate in the Sweets Contest.
3	"Kuromi's Great Recipe Heist"	July 24, 2025
4	"Honey Car Chase!"	July 24, 2025
5	"The Sweets Contest Begins"	July 24, 2025
My Melody, Flat, and Kuromi participate in the Sweets Contest hosted by Mr. Pistachio, a green cat baker.
6	"The Secret of Kuromi's Dorayaki"	July 24, 2025
After the Sweets Contest ends, My Melody and Kuromi find themselves chased through a dark forest by citizens who have been corrupted into creatures with glowing red eyes.
7	"What Should I Do?"	July 24, 2025
8	"Time for Teamwork"	July 24, 2025
As Tanba and Sasage are ready to regret their mistakes, Kuromi puts aside her hostility and comforts My Melody, who is crying over the situation. Kuromi tells My Melody that their bond can fix this rivalry.
9	"To the Cloud Kingdom!"	July 24, 2025
Wanting to make up and share her honest feelings with Kuromi, My Melody takes her to visit the Cloud Kingdom.
10	"Pistachio's Past"	July 24, 2025
11	"All For Our Best Friend"	July 24, 2025
12	"My Melody & Kuromi"	July 24, 2025

== Release ==
My Melody & Kuromi premiered on July 24, 2025, on Netflix. The series serves as both a semicentennial and vicennial celebration for My Melody (50 years), and Kuromi (20 years), respectively.

== Reception ==
My Melody & Kuromi was awarded Best Animation at the Asian Academy Creative Awards 2025. The series is currently being nominated for an International Emmy Award for Kids:Animation.
