= Sanrio Boys =

Japanese media franchise

- Cover of the first manga volume

サンリオ男子 (Sanrio Danshi)
- Genre: Comedy, slice of life
- Manga

Sanrio Danshi: Oretachi, Seishun, Hajimemashita and Sanrio Danshi: Oretachi, Koi, Hajimemashita
- Written by: Mai Andō
- Published by: Shogakukan
- Imprint: Flower Comics
- Magazine: MangaONE; Sho-Comi
- Original run: 2016 – present
- Volumes: 5
- Video game

Sanrio Danshi: Watashi, Koi wo, Shirimashita
- Developer: Cybird
- Publisher: Cybird
- Genre: Visual Novel
- Platform: Android, iOS
- Released: September 13, 2016
- Anime television series
- Directed by: Masashi Kudō
- Written by: Takashi Aoshima
- Music by: Junpei Fujita
- Studio: Pierrot (Note: Production assistance (制作協力) for all episodes provided by Pierrot+.)
- Licensed by: NA: Ponycan USA
- Original network: Tokyo MX, MBS
- Original run: January 6, 2018 – March 24, 2018
- Episodes: 12

Sanrio Boys (サンリオ男子, Sanrio Danshi) is a Japanese media franchise created by Sanrio in November 2015. The Sanrio Boys were conceptualized as a social media project to promote merchandise for Sanrio's best-selling characters. Due to its popularity, it grew to have its own merchandise line, a manga series, a series of character drama CDs, a 2016 smartphone game for iOS and Android, and an anime television series by Pierrot aired from January to March 2018.

== Background ==
The Sanrio Boys were created by Sanrio in November 2015 to promote merchandise for their best-selling characters on social media, a strategy of which has been compared to Twitter accounts run by characters from Uta no Prince-sama. The Sanrio Boys originally consisted of five characters, but has since then expanded to seven. The characters were so well-received that they received their own line of character merchandise starting in June 2016.

== Characters ==
=== Sanrio Boys ===
Kota Hasegawa (長谷川 康太, Hasegawa Kōta)
Voiced by: Takuya Eguchi
Kota is a fan of Pompompurin after being given a Pompompurin plush toy by his grandmother as a child. He is embarrassed to openly admit he likes Pompompurin until he meets Yu and Shunsuke.
Yu Mizuno (水野 祐, Mizuno Yū)
Voiced by: Soma Saito
Yu is Kota's outgoing classmate who is open about his love for My Melody. He is popular with his classmates for his friendly and sociable personality.
Shunsuke Yoshino (吉野 俊介, Yoshino Shunsuke)
Voiced by: Jun Oosuka
Shunsuke is the ace striker of the soccer team and a fan of Hello Kitty, who he refers to with respect. He has a serious and stoic personality.
Ryo Nishimiya (西宮 諒, Nishimiya Ryō)
Voiced by: Hiroyuki Kagura
Ryo is a shy and beautiful first year student who likes Kiki and Lala from Little Twin Stars.
Seiichiro Minamoto (源 誠一郎, Minamoto Seiichirō)
Voiced by: Yuma Uchida
Seiichiro is the president of the student council and a member of the archery team. He loves Cinnamoroll.
Subaru Amagaya (雨ケ谷 昴, Amagaya Subaru)
Voiced by: Yoshitsugu Matsuoka
Subaru is a wannabe delinquent who loves Bad Badtz-Maru. He was introduced in April 2017.
Naoki Sugami (菅見 直樹, Sugami Naoki)
Voiced by: Wataru Hatano
Naoki is a biology teacher who loves Keroppi. He was introduced in April 2017.

=== Kansai Sanrio Boys ===
Yumenosuke Toyohara (豊原夢ノ介, Toyohara Yumenosuke)
Yumenosuke is a fan of Hello Kitty. He was first introduced as a character for Miracle Stage: Sanrio Boys at Sanrio Expo 2018.
Torao Hagura (羽倉虎男, Hagura Torao)
Torao is a friend of Yumenosuke who loves Kuromi thanks to him. He was first introduced as a character for Miracle Stage: Sanrio Boys at Sanrio Expo 2018.
Tomohiro Kashiwagi (柏木智博, Kashiwagi Tomohiro)
Tomohiro is the president of the mandolin guitar club. He is a fan of Pochacco. He was first introduced as a character for Miracle Stage: Sanrio Boys at Sanrio Expo 2018.
Yuzu Wakano (若野ゆず, Yuzu Wakano)
Yuzu is Tomohiro's roommate/childhood friend and a fan of Kirimi. He was first introduced as a character for Miracle Stage: Sanrio Boys at Sanrio Expo 2018.
Jun Fujita (藤田潤, Fujita Jun)
Fujita is a teacher who loves Tuxedo Sam. He was first introduced as a character for Miracle Stage: Sanrio Boys at Sanrio Expo 2018.

=== Secondary characters ===
Yuri Mizuno (水野 由梨, Mizuno Yuri)
Voiced by: Akane Fujita
Yuri is Yū's younger sister and is in middle school. She has a strained relationship with him, and disapproves of him liking My Melody.
Tadashi Tsuchiya (土屋 正, Tsuchiya Tadashi)
Voiced by: Chihiro Suzuki
Yamato Machida (町田 大和, Machida Yamato)
Voiced by: Daisuke Kishio
Tomo Matsuo (松尾智, Matsuo Tomo)
Voiced by: Makoto Furukawa

== Media ==
=== Manga ===
Sanrio Boys was adapted into two manga adaptations written and illustrated by Mai Ando, with both manga series running concurrently. Sanrio Danshi: Oretachi, Seishun, Hajimemashita (サンリオ男子～俺たち、青春、はじめました。～), which features the Sanrio Boys' daily lives, was published on the mobile app MangaONE starting April 2016. Sanrio Danshi: Oretachi, Koi, Hajimemashita (サンリオ男子～俺たち、恋、はじめました。～), which features one of the Sanrio Boys being romantically involved with a girl, was serialized in the magazine Sho-Comi starting from its June 2016 issue. Both were compiled into volume format and released under the title Sanrio Boys under Shogakukan's Flower Comics imprint.

No.	Release date	ISBN
1	July 22, 2016	9784091385055
2	February 24, 2017	9784091391568
3	July 26, 2017	9784091394767
4	November 24, 2017	9784091397669
5	March 26, 2018	9784098700110

=== Game ===
A visual novel style dating sim game was released onto Android and iOS under the name Sanrio Danshi: Watashi, Koi wo, Shirimashita. (サンリオ男子～わたし、恋を、知りました。～) on September 13, 2016. The theme song is "Fun! Fantastic Girl", produced by Elements Garden and performed by the voice actors of Sanrio Boys. Approximately 100,000 users downloaded the game during the first six days of release.

=== Anime ===
An anime adaptation of Sanrio Boys was announced in 2017. The series was directed by Masashi Kudō and written by Takashi Aoshima, and the anime production was handled by Pierrot. The anime aired for 12 episodes from January 6 to March 24, 2018. The series is licensed by Ponycan USA in North America, who simulcasted the series on Crunchyroll.

No.	Title	Original release date
1	"It All Started With Pompompurin" "Hajimari wa Pomupomupurin" (はじまりはポムポムプリン)	January 6, 2018
2	"Gift Gate After the Rain" "Ameagari no Gifuto Gēto" (雨上がりのギフトゲート)	January 13, 2018
3	"My Sister Blue" "Mai Shisutā Burū" (マイ♪シスター・ブルー)	January 20, 2018
4	"Hello Friends" "Harō Furenzu!" (ハローフレンズ！)	January 27, 2018
5	"Broken Rose-Colored Clouds" "Kowareta Bara-iro Kumo" (壊れたバラ色雲)	February 3, 2018
6	"Above the Distant Clouds" "Tōi o Sora no Kumo no Ue" (遠いお空の雲の上)	February 10, 2018
7	"Miraculous Holiday" "Mirakuru na Horidē" (ミラクルなホリデー)	February 17, 2018
8	"Sparkling Rhapsody" "Kirakira Kyōsōkyoku" (キラキラ狂想曲)	February 24, 2018
9	"The Boys' Vacation!" "Danshi's Bakēshon" (男子’sバケーション)	March 3, 2018
10	"Dream Galaxy, Compassion Planet" "Yume seiun Omoiyariboshi" (ゆめ星雲おもいやり星)	March 10, 2018
11	"IN THE DARK"	March 17, 2018
12	"The Magic of Friends" "Tomodachi no Mahō" (ともだちの魔法)	March 24, 2018

=== Stage play ===
A stage play titled Miracle☆Stage Sanrio Boys was announced at the end of episode 12 of the anime. The play is directed by Masami Itō, with the script written by Shinjirō Kameda, the choreography by Tetsuharu, and the music composed by Yu. The main cast consists of Naoya Kitagawa as Kōta, Hiroki Sasamori as Yū, Tsubasa Yoshizawa as Shunsuke, Yū Miyazaki as Ryō, Shinichi Wagō as Seiichiro, Kōhei Kishi as Subaru Amagaya, and Jin Hiramaki as Naoki. Five new characters created exclusively for the play were revealed at Sanrio Expo 2018. The play ran from November 29 to December 9, 2018, at The Galaxy Theatre in Tokyo. The final show on December 9 was live streamed on Niconico to Japanese residents. Pompompurin, My Melody, and Hello Kitty made guest appearances at alternating shows.

== Reception ==
As of April 5, 2018, the manga had 200,000 copies in print.

Rebecca Silverman of Anime News Network gave the anime series a mixed review, mentioning that while the first half of the series was well-written, the second half of the series "took a nosedive" and felt like an "overt advertisement."
