= Beatcats =

Japanese virtual band

Background information
- Also known as: Beatcat Girls
- Origin: Japan
- Genre: J-pop
- Years active: 2020–2024
- Label: Pony Canyon
- Members: Mia; Chelsea; Rico; Layla; Emma
- Website: www.segatoys.co.jp/beatcats/

Beatcats (ビートキャッツ, Bītokyattsu) are a Japanese character franchise created as a joint venture between Sanrio and Sega Toys. The third collaborative effort after Jewelpet and Rilu Rilu Fairilu, it is the first Sanrio franchise released as a musical group. The characters in Beatcats consist of Mia, Chelsea, Rico, Layla, and Emma. As a musical group, Beatcats are signed under the Japanese recording label Pony Canyon and marketed as a virtual band.

== History ==
Beatcats was created by both Sanrio and Sega Toys as their third collaborative effort. Unlike its previous collaborations, which are meant to develop into their own Animated series and Manga, the franchise more dabbles into the music scene and made the characters a five-member virtual group. The aim for the new franchise is to appeal towards both the elementary and junior high school demographic, with "fashionable, cute and cool" appeal and "energetic dance and songs to encourage the feelings of excitement, love and friendship."

Sega Toys and Sanrio worked together alongside music company Pony Canyon for the band's songs and vocals. The companies aim to release both songs and dance videos related to the group through social media, in hopes to resonate with the teen demographic and to build a world and lore around the group. Sega Toys also announced a smartphone game app for various mobile platform as well as release a variety of products and merchandise revolving around the group.

The group officially debuted on October 8, 2020, with their debut digital single which streams on several licensed music streaming sites, including Apple Music, Spotify, and Amazon Music.

== Members ==
- Mia (ミア)
- Chelsea (チェルシー, Cherushī)
- Rico (リコ, Riko)
- Layla (レイラ, Reira)
- Emma (エマ, Ema)

== Discography ==
=== Singles ===
Title	Peak Oricon position	Notes
Beatcats: Release date: October 8, 2020	N/A	First Digital-only release
"Zig-zag Love": Release date: January 8, 2021	N/A	
"Meow": Release date: February 22 2021	N/A	
"Colorful Days": Release date: April 28, 2021	N/A	
"Mew Mew Vampire": Release date: August 18, 2021	N/A	
"Colorful Blood": Release date: October 5, 2021	N/A	
"Awayuki" (淡雪 Snowfall): Release date: December 1, 2021	N/A	
"Showtime": Release date: February 21, 2022	N/A	
"Delicious Beat": Release date: April 16, 2022	N/A	
"Kimiiro": Release date: July 22, 2022	N/A	
Nyaightmare Party: Release Date: November 23, 2022	N/A	
Hana Akari (花明かり Flower Light): Release Date: March 15, 2023	N/A	
Torikonano: Release Date: May 24, 2023	N/A	
Beatcats March: Release Date: October 23, 2023	N/A	
Spicy Cats: Release Date: November 22, 2023	N/A	
Tutturtiya: Release Date: December 22, 2023	N/A	
222 (nyan nyan nyan): Release Date: February 22, 2024	N/A	Last Digital-only release
