= Jenny Yokobori =

American voice actress (born 1997)

- Born: Jennifer N. Yokobori; February 11, 1997 (age 29); Las Vegas, Nevada, U.S.
- Occupation: Voice actress
- Years active: 2013–present
- Agent: Atlas Talent

Jennifer N. Yokobori (born February 11, 1997) is an American voice actress. She is best known for voicing Yoimiya in Genshin Impact and Kuromi and Cinnamoroll in Hello Kitty and Friends Supercute Adventures, as well as the voice of Kuromi for the English dubbing of the Netflix stop motion animated series My Melody & Kuromi.

== Career ==
In 2018, Yokobori began her voice acting career when she voiced the character known as Elice in the online video game Fire Emblem Heroes.

Yokobori provided the American voice of Dashi in the children's animated series Octonauts, which premiered on Netflix in 2020.

In 2021, Yokobori provided the English voice of Yoimiya in the video game Genshin Impact. The same year, she replaced Tress MacNeille as the voice of Kumiko in The Simpsons, starting with the thirty-second season when the show was working towards a goal to not have white actors perform non-white characters.

== Filmography ==
=== Film and TV ===
Year	Title	Role	Notes	Source
2015	Sterling Silver	Young Sterling's Classmate		
2016	All In	Partier		
2016	Vinyasa Flow	Yoga Student		
2017	Campus Catwalk	Nina Takahashi		
2020	Tamayomi: The Baseball Girls	Nakayama (voice)		
2020	Central Park	Japanese Girl (voice)	Episode: "Rival Busker"	
2020	Octonauts and the Caves of Sac Actun	Dashi	US dub (Netflix version)	
2020	Baby	Aurora	English dub	
2020	The School Nurse Files	Radi, Gweong-Hwa	English dub	
2020	Octonauts and the Great Barrier Reef	Dashi (voice)		
2020	Akudama Drive	Execution Division Pupil	English dub	
2020	Sweet Home	Additional voices (voice)	English dub	
2020–24	Droners	Mina / Mawu / Lion Lilly / Chameleon Crab / Piranicus (voice)		
2020–present	Rainbow High	Jade Hunter (voice)	Main role; seasons 1-2	
2020–present	Rainbow High	Ainsley Slater (voice)	seasons 1-2	
2020–present	Hello Kitty and Friends Supercute Adventures	Kuromi / Cinnamoroll (voice)		
2020–present	Pokémon	Horace / Hatenna / Hattrem / Hatterene (voice)	English dub	
2021	Edens Zero	Xiaomei (voice)	English dub	
2021	Seal Team	Geraldo's Watch, Additional voices (voice)		
2021–present	The Simpsons	Kumiko Albertson (voice)	Succeeding Tress MacNeille	
2022	Blue Period	Umino (voice)	English dub	
2022	Odd Taxi	Shiho Ichimura (voice)	English dub	
2022	The Boys Presents: Diabolical	Laser Baby (voice)	Episode: "Laser Baby's Day Out"	
2022	Spriggan	Yoshino Somei (voice)	English dub	
2022	Romantic Killer	Saki (voice)	English dub	
2023	Big City Greens	Serenity Spruce (voice)	Episode: "Junk Junkie"	
2024	Rascal Does Not Dream of a Knapsack Kid	Rio Futaba (voice)	Film; English dub	
2024	The Grimm Variations	Scarlet (voice)	ONA; English dub, Episode 2: Little Red Riding Hood	
2024	Rascal Does Not Dream of Bunny Girl Senpai	Rio Futaba (voice)	English dub	
2025	Magilumiere Magical Girls Inc.	Hitomi Koshigaya (voice)	English dub	
2025	My Melody & Kuromi	Kuromi (voice)	English dub	
2025	Gnosia	SQ (voice)	English dub	
2026	Welcome to Sucre Town	Cinnamoroll (voice)	English dub	
2026	Grow Up Show: Sunflower Circus	Isuzu Ikazuchi (voice)	English dub	

=== Video games ===
Year	Title	Role	Source
2014	Smite	"Jenny" XJ-9 Wakeman, other characters	
2017	Fire Emblem Heroes	Elice, Eleonora Yumizuru	
2020	XCOM: Chimera Squad	Terminal	
2020	Ghost of Tsushima	Additional Voices	
2020	Wasteland 3	Lt. Connie Zeng	
2020	NBA 2K21	Lower Bowl crowd	
2020	Demon's Souls	The Phalanx	
2021	Genshin Impact	Yoimiya	
2021	Mary Skelter Finale	Gallows	
2022	Relayer	Venus	
2022	Ghostwire: Tokyo	Erika, Koomote, Girl A, Boy A	
2022	Paladins	Kasumi	
2022	Goddess of Victory: Nikke	Diesel, Maiden	
2023	Honkai: Star Rail	Xueyi	
2023	Street Fighter 6	Yua	
2023	Master Detective Archives: Rain Code	Martina Electro	
2023	Neptunia: Sisters vs Sisters	Anri	
2023	Granblue Fantasy Versus: Rising	Nier	
2023	Arknights	Projekt Red, Deepcolor	
2023	Fortnite	Evie	
2023	Cookie Run: Kingdom	Black Lemonade Cookie	
2023	Omega Strikers	Finii	
2023	Rune Factory 3 Special	Marian	
2023	Disgaea 7: Vows of the Virtueless	Additional voices	
2024	Yars Rising	Emi "Yar" Kimura	
2024	Card-en-Ciel	Kuon (Humanoid Mode)	
2024	YIIK: A Postmodern RPG	Asuka Furutani	
2024	Clock Tower: Rewind	Anne, Narrator	
2025	Yakuza 0 Director's Cut	Additional voices	
2025	No Sleep for Kaname Date	Akemi	
2026	Chunky JUMP!	Dr. Veznor	
2027	The Bunny Graveyard II	Dr. Veznor	

=== Anime ===
Year	Title	Role	Notes	Source
2021	Death Battle	Ryūko Matoi	Episode 141: "Shadow VS Ryūko"	
2021	Pokémon Evolutions	Miki	Episode 7: "The Show"	

=== Audio Dramas ===
Year	Title	Role	Notes	Source
2026	Sonic the Hedgehog Presents: The Chaotix Casefiles	Vanilla the Rabbit		

=== Writer/Director ===
Year	Project	Role
2020	Rainbow High	Director
2020	Gods School	Writer
