= Jewelpet Attack Travel! =

2022 Japanese animated film

- Theatrical release poster

Japanese name
- Kanji: ジュエルペット あたっくとらべる!
- Literal meaning: Jewelpet Attack Travel!
- Directed by: Hiroshi Negishi
- Written by: Kanichi Katou
- Starring: Ayaka Saito; Aya Hirano; Nozomi Sasaki; Miyuki Sawashiro; Mayumi Tsuchiya; Takeshi Kusao
- Music by: Shingo Nishimura
- Production companies: Ashi Productions; Saber Project
- Distributed by: AEON Entertainment
- Release date: 14 May 2022; (Niconico Live)
- Running time: 23 minutes
- Country: Japan
- Language: Japanese

Jewelpet Attack Travel! (ジュエルペット あたっくとらべる!, Juerupetto Atakku Toraberu!) is a 2022 Japanese animated fantasy comedy film directed by Hiroshi Negishi and produced by Ashi Productions. It premiered on the internet streaming site Niconico on 14 May 2022. Attack Travel! is the first anime project in the Jewelpet franchise (created as a joint venture between Sanrio and Sega Toys) in seven years; originally meant to celebrate the 10th anniversary of the franchise being adapted for television.

It was first set for release on February 7, 2020, and would have been attached to the first feature film from Negishi's Zero-G animation studio, an original project titled Kukuriraige: Sanxingdui Fantasy (ククリレイジュ-三星堆伝奇-, Kukurireiju: Sanseitai Denki). The same year on January 24, Sanrio and Aeon Entertainment announced that both projects had been removed from the 2020 release schedule.

== Synopsis ==
Ruby and her friends are going on a school trip with Teacher Iruka to Sichuan Province in China. However, there is something unnatural about the tour conductor, driver, and guide on their sightseeing bus as it heads towards its final destination.
