= Yuko Yamaguchi =

Japanese character designer and illustrator

Yuko Yamaguchi (山口 裕子, Yamaguchi Yūko; born October 24, 1955) is a Japanese character designer and illustrator. She is well known as the third character designer of Hello Kitty.

== Biography ==
=== Early life ===
Yamaguchi was born in Kōchi, Kōchi, Japan. She attended Joshibi University of Art and Design where she studied industrial design.

=== Sanrio tenure ===
Yamaguchi joined Sanrio in 1978. She later rose to become Director and Head of Character Production.

In 1980, Yamaguchi won an internal design contest with her design of Hello Kitty playing the piano, and would become the third primary designer of Hello Kitty.

In addition to her work on Hello Kitty, she served as the designer for the Sanrio characters Dear Daniel and Charmmy Kitty, and has been designing Jewelpet since 2008. She also created the illustration for TV Asahi's official mascot, Go-Chan.

In February 2026, Sanrio announced that Yamaguchi would step down after 46 years as Hello Kitty's designer. She was succeeded by a designer introduced under the pen name Aya. Yamaguchi will remain with Sanrio as an advisor.
