= Hello Kitty (disambiguation) =

Hello Kitty is a fictional character produced by the Japanese company Sanrio.

Hello Kitty may also refer to:

== Animations ==
- The Adventures of Hello Kitty & Friends, a 3D CGI animated series
- Hello Kitty's Furry Tale Theater, an animated series based on the popular Japanese character, Hello Kitty

== Games ==
- Hello Kitty Online, online role playing game
- Hello Kitty: Roller Rescue, an action-adventure video game
- Hello Kitty no Hanabatake, children's platform game
- Hello Kitty: Big City Dreams, Hello Kitty game for the Nintendo DS
- Hello Kitty's Cube Frenzy, puzzle game featuring Hello Kitty for the PlayStation, Game Boy Color gaming systems

== Music ==
- "Hello Kitty" (song), by Avril Lavigne, 2014
- "Hello Kitty", a song by Critters Buggin from Monkeypot Merganzer, 1997
- "Hello Kitty", a song by Hum, 1992
- "Hello Kitty", a song by Marina from Princess of Power, 2025
- "Hello Kitty", a song by Slayyyter, 2018
- "Shout (Hello Kitty)", a version of Devo's "Shout" from their E-Z Listening Disc, 1987

== Other ==
- Hello Kitty murder, a 1999 kidnapping and murder of a woman in Hong Kong, in which the victim's head was stuffed into a Hello Kitty doll
- Kitty (disambiguation)
