= Sanrio =

Japanese entertainment company

Sanrio Company, Ltd.
- Logo used since 1997

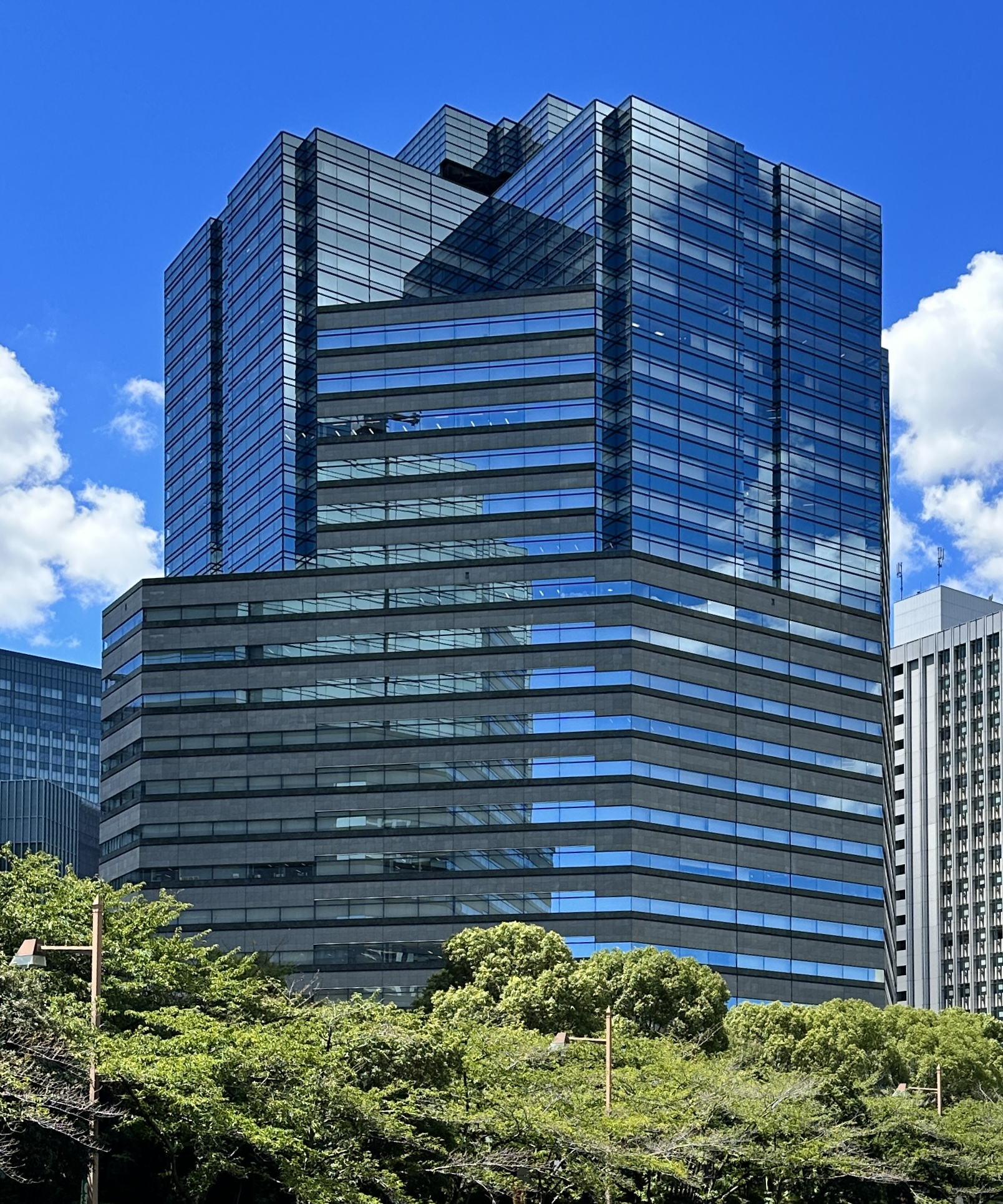
- Headquarters at Gate City Osaki in Ōsaki, Shinagawa, Tokyo
- Native name: 株式会社サンリオ
- Romanized name: Kabushiki-gaisha Sanrio
- Formerly: Yamanashi Silk Center Co., Ltd. (1960–1973)
- Type: Public KK
- Traded as: TYO: 8136
- Industry: Wholesale
- Founded: August 10, 1960; 66 years ago
- Founder: Shintaro Tsuji
- Headquarters: Ōsaki, Shinagawa, Tokyo, Japan
- Area served: Worldwide
- Key people: Shintaro Tsuji (Honorary Chairman); Tomokuni Tsuji (President)
- Products: Fashion; Accessories; Gifts; Entertainment; Video games; Plushies; Toys
- Brands: Hello Kitty and Friends; Mr. Men & Little Miss
- Revenue: ▲¥72,624 million (2023)
- Operating income: ▲¥13,247 million (2023)
- Net income: ▲¥8,225 million (2023)
- Total assets: ▲¥100,704 million (2023)
- Total equity: ▲¥50,152 million (2023)
- Number of employees: 797 (2025)
- Subsidiaries: Japan: Kokoro; Sanriowave; Sanrio Entertainment; Sanrio Enterprise; Sanrio Music Publications; International: Sanrio, Inc. (North America); Sanrio do Brasil Comercio e Representacoes (Brazil); Sanrio Global (UK); Sanrio GmbH (Europe); Sanrio Global Asia (Southeast Asia); Sanrio Shanghai International Trade (China); Sanrio Far East (Shenzhen) (China); Sanrio (Hong Kong) (Hong Kong); Sanrio Korea (South Korea); Sanrio Taiwan (Taiwan); THOIP; Mister Men Limited
- Website: corporate.sanrio.co.jp/en; sanrio.co.jp/en

Sanrio Company, Ltd. (Japanese: 株式会社サンリオ, Hepburn: Kabushiki-gaisha Sanrio; stylized in all caps) is a Japanese entertainment company that designs, licenses, and manufactures products focusing on the kawaii ("cute") segment of Japanese popular culture. Their products include stationery, school supplies, gifts, and accessories, which are sold worldwide, including at specialty brand retail stores in Japan. Sanrio's best-known character is Hello Kitty, a cartoon cat and one of the most successful marketing brands in the world.

Besides selling character goods, Sanrio takes part in film production and publishing. They own the rights to the Mr. Men characters and Japanese licensing rights to the Peanuts characters. Their animatronics branch, Kokoro Company, Ltd. (kokoro being Japanese for "heart"), is best known for the Actroid android. The company also runs several KFC franchises across Tokyo and Saitama Prefecture.

== History ==
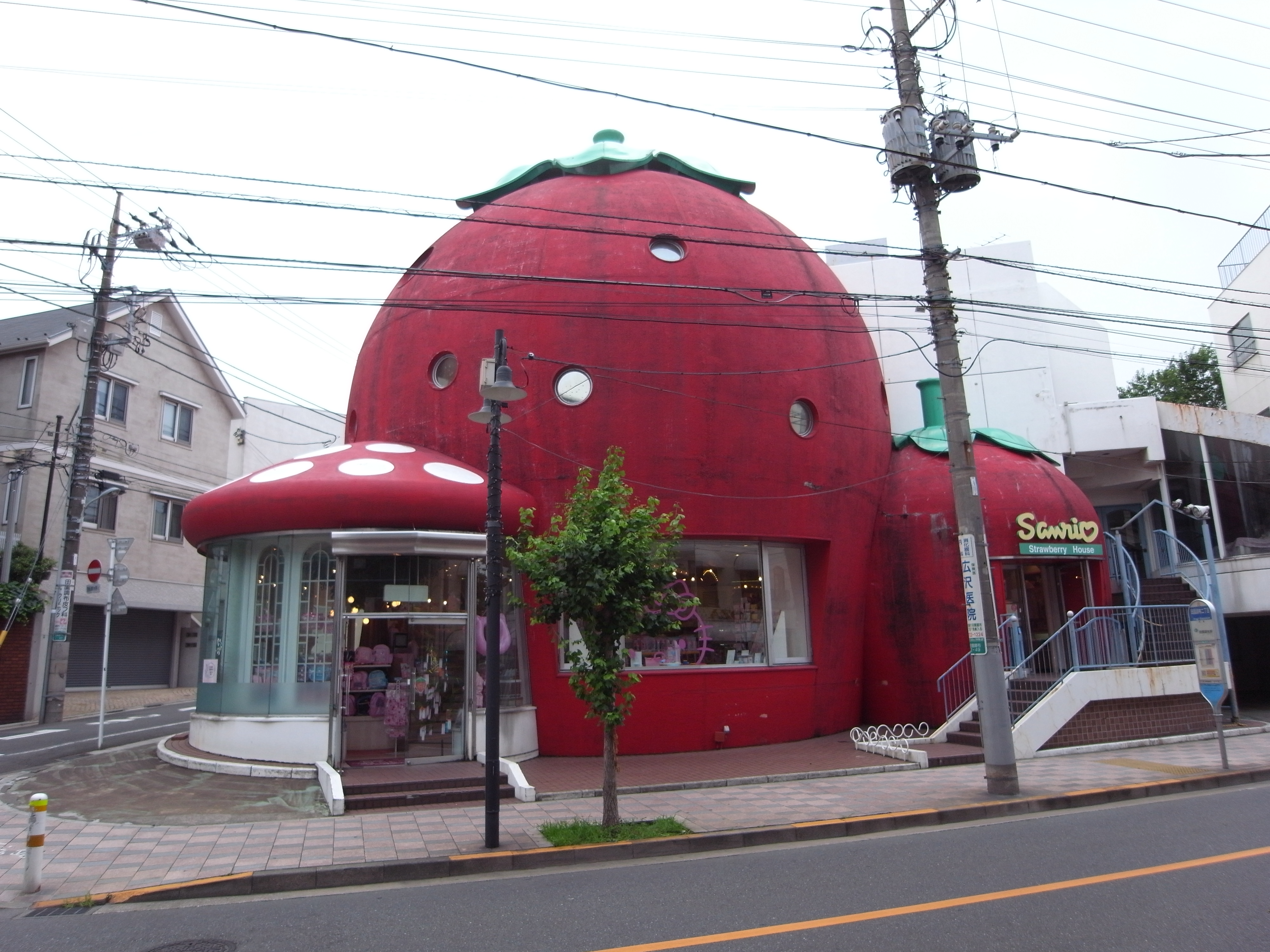
Sanrio Strawberry House, a former Sanrio store in Den-en-chōfu, Ōta, Tokyo

Shintaro Tsuji founded Sanrio on August 10, 1960, then known as the Yamanashi Silk Company using ¥1 million in capital. (Note: ¥250,000 of the capital came from Tsuji's former government colleagues, while the rest came from his government pension and personal savings.) In 1962, Tsuji expanded his enterprise from silk to rubber sandals with flowers painted on them. Tsuji noticed his success gained by merely adding a cute design to the sandals. He began using existing cartoon characters for his merchandise. In the late 1960s, the company began producing goods featuring Charles M. Schulz's dog character Snoopy, from the American comic strip Peanuts, after acquiring the Japanese licensing rights.

In 1973, the company was officially established under the name Sanrio. In the book Kore ga Sanrio no Himitsu Desu (これがサンリオの秘密です) or These are Sanrio's Secrets Tsuji, Sanrio's founder, said that Yamanashi (山梨), part of the company's former name, has an alternative on'yomi reading of Sanri. The remaining o was added from the ou (オウ) sound people make when they are excited. The company's European website gives another origin of the name, saying the name comes from the Spanish words san ('holy') and río ('river').

Tsuji hired his own designers to create characters for Sanrio, so as to not have to pay outside royalty fees. The first original Sanrio character, Coro Chan, was introduced in 1973. Hello Kitty was added to the lineup of early Sanrio characters in 1974 and the first related merchandise was released the following year. The popular feline whose mouth is usually invisible has had both peaks and drops in sales over the years but always has been the highest contributor to Sanrio's sales. Sanrio constantly adds new characters to its lineup. Specific characters are rotated in and out of active production. For a short time, Osamu Tezuka's baby unicorn character Unico, who starred in two feature-length animated films in the early 1980s, was also part of Sanrio's lineup; however, the rights to Unico shifted to Tezuka Productions, Osamu Tezuka's own company, after Tezuka's death in 1989.

In late 2003, Sanrio won the "Top Brand with a Conscience" award from the Medinge Group of Sweden for its communication principles. The company has partnered with UNICEF since 1984. In 2006, Sanrio launched Sanrio Digital together with Typhoon Games to expand to the Internet, online games, and mobile services.

Beginning with Jewelpet in 2008, Sanrio started collaborating with Sega Toys in creating characters intended to become media franchises. Subsequent collaborations include Rilu Rilu Fairilu in 2016 and Beatcats in 2020.

In 2010, the company celebrated its 50th anniversary. In conjunction with this, Build-A-Bear Workshop released limited-edition stuffed toys of several Sanrio characters, including Hello Kitty, Chococat, My Melody and Keroppi.

Hello Kitty is alleged to be drawn in a similar style to the rabbit character Miffy. On August 26, 2010, Mercis BV, representing Miffy's creator Dick Bruna, filed a lawsuit against Sanrio, claiming that one of Hello Kitty's companion characters, a rabbit named Cathy, infringed on the copyright and trademark of Miffy. On November 2, 2010, a Dutch court ruled against Sanrio and ordered the company to stop marketing Cathy products in Belgium, Luxembourg, and the Netherlands. Following the March 11, 2011, earthquake and tsunami in Japan, Sanrio and Mercis reached an out-of-court settlement on June 7, 2011, for Sanrio to halt production worldwide of merchandise that features Cathy. They also jointly announced a €150,000 donation to earthquake victims.

In December 2011, Sanrio Global acquired the rights to the Mr. Men characters, which includes the subsidiary Mr Men Films Ltd, taking over Chorion's THOIP company.

In 2019, the European Commission fined Sanrio 6.2 million euros (approximately 6.9 million US dollars) for blocking cross-border sales of its licensed products.

In June 2020, it was announced that the company's founder and president, Shintaro Tsuji, would step down from the role and hand control of the company to his grandson, Tomokuni Tsuji. Tomokuni was just 31 at the time, making him the youngest chief executive of a listed Japanese company. Shintaro Tsuji ran the company for 60 years.

Under Tomokuni Tsuji, Sanrio sought to reduce its reliance on Hello Kitty by promoting a broader range of characters; by 2024, the year of Hello Kitty's 50th anniversary, the character accounted for about 30 percent of the company's business worldwide. After sales and profits declined for seven years from 2014, Sanrio reported an operating profit of ¥27 billion for the year ended March 2024, surpassing its 2014 record.

== Locations ==
=== Japan ===
Sanrio hosts two theme parks in Japan, Sanrio Puroland in Tama, Tokyo, and Harmonyland in Hiji, Ōita, Kyūshū. Sanrio Puroland opened on December 7, 1990, the birthday of founder Shintaro Tsuji, and attracts more than 1.5 million visitors a year; Harmonyland opened the following year. In April 2026, Sanrio opened the Yamanashi Strawberry King Museum in Kai, Yamanashi, which consists of two exhibition halls: one about Sanrio's history and characters, and the other dedicated to Shintaro Tsuji's life and work.

=== North America ===
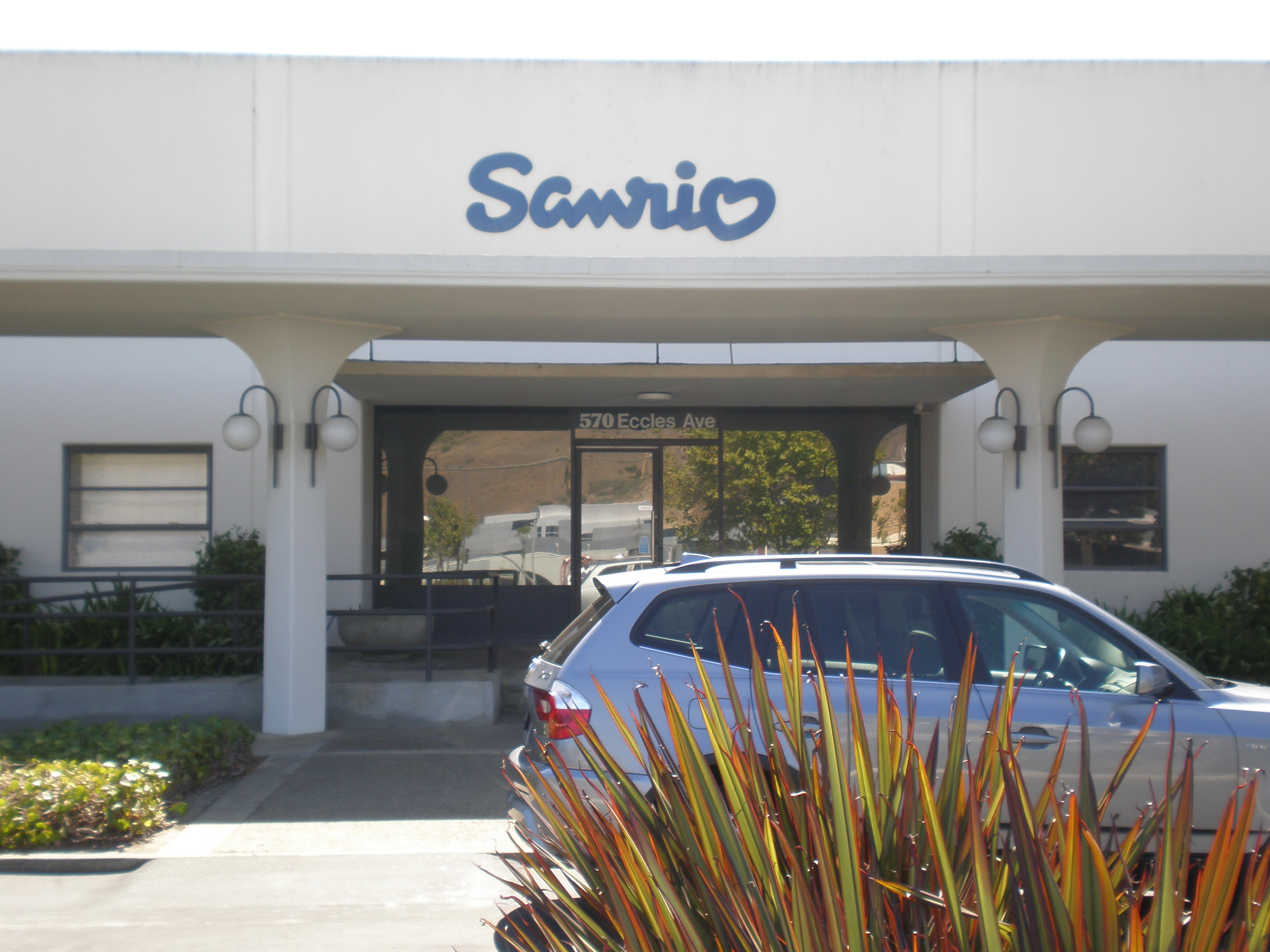
Sanrio, Inc. headquarters in South San Francisco

Sanrio, Inc. is Sanrio's North American subsidiary. Sanrio, Inc. has offices in South San Francisco, California, and Torrance, California. Sanrio's first Western Hemisphere store opened in San Jose's Eastridge Mall. In 2008, Sanrio, Inc. opened its high-end boutique called Sanrio Luxe in New York City's Times Square. In the Western Hemisphere, Sanrio character-branded products are sold in upwards of 13,000 locations including department, specialty, and national chain stores and over 85 Sanrio boutiques. In April 2010, the first and only Sanrio-licensed eatery (Sanrio Cafe) in the U.S. opened at Pearlridge's Downtown phase in Aiea, Hawaii.

In 2004, Sanrio Co. Ltd., expanded its license to one of its major licensee and plush suppliers Nakajima USA to include the owning and operating of all Sanrio branded stores in the U.S., overseeing the relationships between individual licensed stores and supplying all categories of products for the retail stores in the US and wholesale accounts.

== Characters ==
Sanrio has created over 450 characters as of 2022, the best known of which is the white cat character Hello Kitty from 1974. Other well-known characters include the rabbit My Melody from 1975, the frog Keroppi from 1988, the penguin Bad Badtz-Maru from 1993, the yellow dog Pompompurin from 1996, the white dog Cinnamoroll from 2001, the rabbit Kuromi from 2005, the animal series Jewelpet from 2008, the egg character Gudetama from 2013, and the red panda Aggressive Retsuko from 2015.

Notable designers of Sanrio characters include Yuko Shimizu, original designer of Hello Kitty, Yuko Yamaguchi, lead designer for most of Hello Kitty's history, and Miyuki Okumura, original designer of Cinnamoroll.

Since 1986, Sanrio has held the annual Sanrio Character Ranking poll, where fans can vote on their favorite characters. It began in the Strawberry Newspaper published by Sanrio in Japan, but voting now takes place online and is open to international audiences.

Besides their own original characters, Sanrio also owns the rights to the Mr. Men characters and Japanese licensing rights to the Peanuts characters.

== Filmography ==
=== Theatrical ===
From 1977 to 1985, Sanrio produced movies through their Sanrio Films label. After A Journey Through Fairyland, Sanrio switched gears and started doing short films, OVAs, and TV shows based on their characters. In 2006, Sanrio announced they are again going to do feature-length films.

Title (English and Japanese)	Release date	Notes
Joe and the Rose (バラの花とジョー/ Bara no Hana to Joe)	March 7, 1977 (Japan)	Animated short film
Little Jumbo (小さなジャンボ/ Chiisana Jumbo)	September 10, 1977 (Japan)	Animated short film
Who Are the DeBolts? And Where Did They Get Nineteen Kids?	September 10, 1977 (Japan); December 7, 1977 (USA)	Live-action documentary; co-produced with Charles M. Schulz Creative Associates and Korty Films
The Mouse and His Child (親子ねずみの不思議な旅/Oyaro nezumi no fushingina tabi)	November 18, 1977 (USA); March 11, 1978 (Japan)	Co-produced with Murakami Wolf; Based on the children's book by Russell Hoban
Ringing Bell (チリンの鈴/Chirin no Suzu)	March 11, 1978 (Japan); April 8, 1983 (USA; Direct to Video)	Animated film; Based on the children's book by Takashi Yanase
Olly Olly Oxen Free (also released as The Great Balloon Adventure)	May 13, 1978 (Japan) c. August 1978 (USA)	Live-action film
Orpheus of the Stars/Metamorphoses/Winds of Change (星のオルフェウス/Hoshi no Orufeusu)	May 26, 1978 (USA; as Metamorphoses); May 3, 1979 (USA; as Winds of Change); October 27, 1979 (Japan; as Orpheus of the Stars)	Animated film; Based on the poem, Metamorphoses, by Ovid; Co-produced with Columbia Pictures
The Glacier Fox (キタキツネ物語/Kita-kitsune monogatari)	July 15, 1978 (Japan); January 5, 1979 (USA)	Live-action documentary
Nutcracker Fantasy (くるみ割り人形/Kurumiwari Ningyō)	March 3, 1979 (Japan); July 6, 1979 (USA)	Stop-motion animated film; Based on The Nutcracker by Pyotr Ilyich Tchaikovsky
Unico: Black Cloud, White Feather (ユニコ 黒い雲と白い羽/Kuroi Kumo Shiroi Hane)	April 30, 1979 (Japan)	Rejected animated pilot; Based on the manga by Osamu Tezuka
A Tale of Africa/The Green Horizon (アフリカ物語/Afurika Monogatari)	July 19, 1980 (Japan) c. 1981 (USA; Released as The Green Horizon on television)	Live-action film
The Fantastic Adventures of Unico (ユニコ)	March 14, 1981 (Japan); May 12, 1983 (USA; released direct-to-video)	Animated film; Co-production with Tezuka Productions & Madhouse; Based on the manga by Osamu Tezuka
The Sea Prince and the Fire Child (シリウスの伝説/The Legend of Sirius)	July 18, 1981 (Japan); September 8, 1982 (USA; released direct-to-video)	Animated film
The Ideon: A Contact (伝説巨神イデオン 接触篇/Densetsu-kyoshin ideon: Sesshoku-hen)	July 10, 1982 (Japan)	Animated film (compilation film based on Space Runaway Ideon); Co-produced with Sunrise/Co-distributed by Shochiku
The Ideon: Be Invoked (伝説巨神イデオン 発動篇/Densetsu kyojin ideon: Hatsudou-hen)	July 10, 1982 (Japan)	Animated film (Alternate ending of the television series: Space Runaway Ideon); Co-produced with Sunrise
Don't Cry, It's Only Thunder	November 5, 1982 (USA)	Live-action film
Unico in the Island of Magic (ユニコ 魔法の島へ)	July 16, 1983 (Japan); November 10, 1983 (USA; released direct-to-video)	Animated film; Based on the manga by Osamu Tezuka
Oshin (おしん)	March 17, 1984 (Japan)	Animated film; Based on the Japanese television drama of the same name
Fairy Florence/A Journey Through Fairyland (妖精フローレンス/Yosei Florence)	October 19, 1985 (Japan); November 4, 1985 (USA; released direct-to-video)	Animated film
My Melody no Akazukin (マイメロディの赤ずきん)	July 22, 1989 (Japan)	Animated film; Part of Sanrio Anime Festival
Hello Kitty no Cinderella (ハローキティのシンデレラ)	July 22, 1989 (Japan)	Animated film; Part of Sanrio Anime Festival
Kiki to Lala no Aoi Tori (キキとララの青い鳥)	July 22, 1989 (Japan)	Animated film; Part of Sanrio Anime Festival
Pokopon no Yukai na Saiyuuki (ぽこぽんのゆかいな西遊記)	July 21, 1990 (Japan)	Animated film; Part of Sanrio Anime Festival
Hello Kitty no Oyayubi Hime (ハローキティのおやゆびひめ)	July 21, 1990 (Japan)	Animated film; Part of Sanrio Anime Festival
Kero Kero Keroppi no Daibouken: Fushigi na Mame no ki (けろけろけろっぴの大冒険 ふしぎな豆の木)	July 21, 1990 (Japan)	Animated film; Part of Sanrio Anime Festival
Kero Kero Keroppi no Sanjuushi (けろけろけろっぴの三銃士)	July 20, 1991 (Japan)	Animated film; Part of Sanrio Anime Festival
Hello Kitty no Mahou no Mori no Ohime-sama (ハローキティの魔法の森のお姫さま)	July 20, 1991 (Japan)	Animated film; Part of Sanrio Anime Festival
Tabo no Ryuuguu Hoshi Dai Tanken (たあ坊の竜宮星大探険)	July 20, 1991 (Japan)	Animated film; Part of Sanrio Anime Festival
Hello Kitty no Minna no Mori o Mamore! (ハローキティのみんなの森をまもれ!)	January 13, 1996 (Japan)	Animated film; Part of Sanrio Anime Festival
Kero Kero Keroppi no Bikkuri! Obake Yashiki (けろけろけろっぴのびっくり! おばけやしき)	January 13, 1996 (Japan)	Animated film; Part of Sanrio Anime Festival
Bad Batzmaru no Ore no Pochi Sekaiichi (バッドばつ丸のオレのポチは世界一)	January 13, 1996 (Japan)	Animated film; Part of Sanrio Anime Festival
Mouse Story: George and Gerald's Adventure (ねずみ物語 ジョージとジェラルドの冒険)	December 22, 2007 (Japan)	Animated film; Co-produced with Madhouse; Released in a double bill with Cinnamoroll the Movie
Cinnamoroll the Movie (シナモン The Movie)	December 22, 2007 (Japan)	Animated film; Co-produced with Madhouse; Released in a double bill with Mouse Story: George and Gerald's Adventure
Jewelpet the Movie: Sweets Dance Princess (映画ジュエルペット スウィーツダンスプリンセス)	August 11, 2012 (Japan)	Animated film; Co-produced with Sega Toys & Studio Comet
Onegai My Melody: Yū & Ai (おねがいマイメロディ)	August 11, 2012 (Japan)	Animated film; Co-produced with Studio Comet
Gō-chan and his Forest Friends Moko & Marvelous Creatures	May 3, 2017 (Japan)	Animated film; Co-produced with TV Asahi & Shin-Ei Animation
Gō-chan ~Moco and the Promise Made on the Ice~	March 18, 2018 (Japan)	Animated film; Co-produced with TV Asahi & Shin-Ei Animation
Jewelpet Attack Travel!	May 14, 2022	Animated short film; Co-produced with Ashi Productions
Untitled Hello Kitty film	July 21, 2028	American animated film; Co-produced with Warner Bros. Pictures Animation, New Line Cinema, Flynn Picture Company & Known Universe
Untitled Kuromi film	TBA 2027	Animated film; Distributed by GAGA Corporation

=== Other animation ===
Sanrio began its involvement in the production of TV and direct-to-video animation during the late 1980s and early 1990s, starting with the US-made Hello Kitty's Furry Tale Theater in 1987. The character My Melody got her first starring role in an animated series in the anime television series, Onegai My Melody, which first aired on TV Osaka on April 3, 2005, and was produced by Studio Comet. The Sugarbunnies franchise was later adapted into a 7-minute short series in 2007 and was popular enough to gain two sequels.

Jewelpet was also adapted into an anime metaseries in 2009, which was also produced by Studio Comet, spanning 6 official seasons and one theatrical movie, making it the longest-running anime adaptation of a Sanrio franchise in history.

Show by Rock!!, a game by Sanrio and Geechs, received an anime adaptation produced by Bones in 2015, which was licensed in the United States by Funimation. Aggretsuko also received three animated adaptations by Fanworks, one on TBS and the latter two released officially on Netflix.

- Mr. Men (1974) – Flicks Films
- Little Miss (1983) – Flicks Films
- Button Nose (1985) – Topcraft
- Hello Kitty's Furry Tale Theater (1987) – DIC Entertainment
- Hello Kitty and Friends (1989–2000) – Grouper Production
- Mr. Men and Little Miss (1995–1997) – Marina Productions/Breakthrough Films and Television
- Flint the Time Detective (1998) – Group TAC
- Hello Kitty's Paradise (1999)
- Hello Kitty's Animation Theater (2001) – Group TAC
- Hello Kitty's Stump Village (2005) – Studio Tomorrow/SOVIK Venture Capital
- Onegai My Melody (2005) – Studio Comet
- U*SA*HA*NA: Dream Ballerina (2006) – Asahi Production
- Hello Kitty: Ringo no Mori Fantasy (2006) – Asahi Production
- Onegai My Melody ~KuruKuru Shuffle!~ (2006) – Studio Comet
- Hello Kitty: Ringo No Mori No Mystery (2007) – Asahi Production
- Sugarbunnies (2007) – Asahi Production
- Onegai My Melody Sukkiri♪ (2007) – Studio Comet
- Hello Kitty: Ringo no Mori to Parallel Town (2007) – Asahi Production
- Sugarbunnies Chocolat! (2008) – Asahi Production
- Onegai♪My Melody Kirara (2008) – Studio Comet
- The Adventures of Hello Kitty & Friends (2008) - Dream Cortex
- Sugarbunnies Fleur (2009) – Asahi Production
- Jewelpet (2009) – Studio Comet
- Jewelpet Twinkle (2010) – Studio Comet
- Jewelpet Sunshine (2011) – Studio Comet
- Jewelpet Kira Deco! (2012) – Studio Comet
- Jewelpet Happiness (2013) – Studio Comet
- Lady Jewelpet (2014) – Zexcs
- Show by Rock!! (2015) – Bones
- Jewelpet: Magical Change (2015) – Studio Deen and TMS Entertainment
- Rilu Rilu Fairilu ~ Yousei no Door ~ (2016) – Studio Deen
- Show by Rock!!# (2016) – Bones
- Rilu Rilu Fairilu ~ Mahou no Kagami ~ (2017) – Studio Deen
- Sanrio Boys (2018) – Pierrot
- Aggretsuko (2018–2023) – Fanworks
- Oshiete Mahou no Pendulum ~ Rilu Rilu Fairilu ~ (2018) - Studio Deen
- Show by Rock!! Mashumairesh!! (2020) – Kinema Citrus
- Mewkledreamy (2020) – J.C.Staff
- Show by Rock!! Stars!! (2021) – Kinema Citrus
- Mewkledreamy Mix! (2021) – J.C.Staff
- Gudetama: An Eggcellent Adventure (2022) – Gathering and Oriental Light and Magic (OLM)
- My Melody & Kuromi (2025) - Toruku Studio

=== Variety shows ===
A few children's variety shows by Sanrio aired on TV Tokyo.

- Daisuki! Hello Kitty (1993–1994)
- Asobou!! Hello Kitty (1994)
- Hello Kitty to Bad Badtz-Maru (1994–1998)
- Kitty's Paradise (1999–2011)
- Sanrio Characters Pon Pon Jump! (2017–2020)
- Fun Fun Kitty! (2020–2022)

== Video games ==
Sanrio has licensed its intellectual property assets such as Hello Kitty, My Melody, and many others to external video game developers since the 1990s, releasing titles such as Hello Kitty's Cube Frenzy (1999), Hello Kitty: Roller Rescue (2005), Hello Kitty: Big City Dreams (2008), Apron of Magic (2010), and Hello Kitty Island Adventure (2023).

A subsidiary of Sanrio, Character Soft, developed and published several games in the early 1990s, with notable examples including Hello Kitty World (1992), Hello Kitty no Ohanabatake (1992), and Sanrio Cup: Pon Pon Volley (1992).

Sanrio Digital was a joint venture between Hong Kong video game developer Typhoon Games and Sanrio's Hong Kong branch Sanriowave Co., Ltd. that produced and published digital content based on Sanrio franchises. Examples of video games produced by Sanrio Digital include Hello Kitty Online, a massively multiplayer online role-playing game released in 2008. Sanrio Digital was later acquired by Animoca Brands in 2021.

On April 21, 2026, Sanrio announced the creation of an in-house team, Sanrio Games, that would develop and publish video games. They released their first game, Hello Kitty Party Land, for the Nintendo Switch and Nintendo Switch 2 on October 29, 2026.

== Publishing ==
Sanrio publishes many books featuring its own characters. It also publishes art books (for instance, those by Keibun Ōta). Sanrio publishes books in many languages, including Japanese and English.
