= HKO =

HKO may refer to:

- Hankou railway station, China Railway pinyin code HKO
- Hello Kitty Online, a video game
- Helsinki Philharmonic Orchestra (Finnish: Helsingin kaupunginorkesteri)
- Hong Kong Observatory
