= Hello Kitty =

Fictional character by Sanrio

- Sanrio character
- First appearance: March 1975 (created 1974)
- Created by: Yuko Shimizu
- Voiced by: Megumi Hayashibara (1990–2023), others (Note: Japanese: Fuyumi Shiraishi (Kitty and Mimmy's New Umbrella); Mami Koyama (Hello Kitty's Cinderella); Akemi Okamura (Hello Kitty's Furry Tale Theater); Megumi Hayashibara (Sanrio Word of Animation, Hello Kitty's Paradise, Various Sanrio Puroland Shows). English: Tara Strong (Hello Kitty's Furry Tale Theater); Karen Bernstein (Hello Kitty and Friends); Melissa Fahn (Hello Kitty's Paradise); Monica Rial (Hello Kitty's Animation Theater); Katia Shirassu (Hello Kitty Fun); Shannon Settlemyre (Growing Up With Hello Kitty); Soness Stevens; Juliet Simmons (Hello Kitty and Friends - Let's Learn Together); Julia Sales (The World of Hello Kitty); Sarah Anne Williams (Hello Kitty and Friends Supercute Adventures).)

In-universe information
- Gender: Female

Hello Kitty, (Note: Japanese: ハロー・キティ, Hepburn: Harōkiti) also known by her real name Kitty White, (Note: キティ・ホワイト, Kiti Howaito) is a fictional character created by Yuko Shimizu, designed by Yuko Yamaguchi, and owned by the Japanese company Sanrio. Sanrio depicts Hello Kitty as a British anthropomorphic white cat with a red bow and no visible mouth. According to her backstory, she lives in a London suburb with her family, and is close to her twin sister Mimmy, who is depicted with a yellow bow.

Hello Kitty was created in 1974 and the first item, a vinyl coin purse, was introduced in 1975. Originally, Hello Kitty was only marketed towards pre-teenage girls, but beginning in the 1990s, the brand found commercial success among teenage and adult consumers as well. Hello Kitty's popularity also grew with the emergence of kawaii (cute) culture. The brand went into decline in Japan after the 1990s, but continued to grow in the international market. By 2010, the character was worth $5 billion a year and The New York Times called her a "global marketing phenomenon". She did about $8 billion at retail in 2013.

UNICEF has appointed Hello Kitty children's ambassador and the Japanese government appointed her ambassador of tourism. There are Sanrio theme parks based on Hello Kitty: Harmonyland in Hiji, Ōita, Japan, Sanrio Puroland in Tama New Town, Tokyo, Japan, and Hello Kitty Shanghai Times in Shanghai, China. The Hello Kitty media franchise has grown to include a number of animated series targeted towards children, as well as several comics, animated films, video games, books, music albums and other media productions. A variety of products have featured the character over the years, like school supplies, clothing, accessories, and toys, along with other items. In 2008, there were over 50,000 different Hello Kitty branded products.

== Creation and design ==
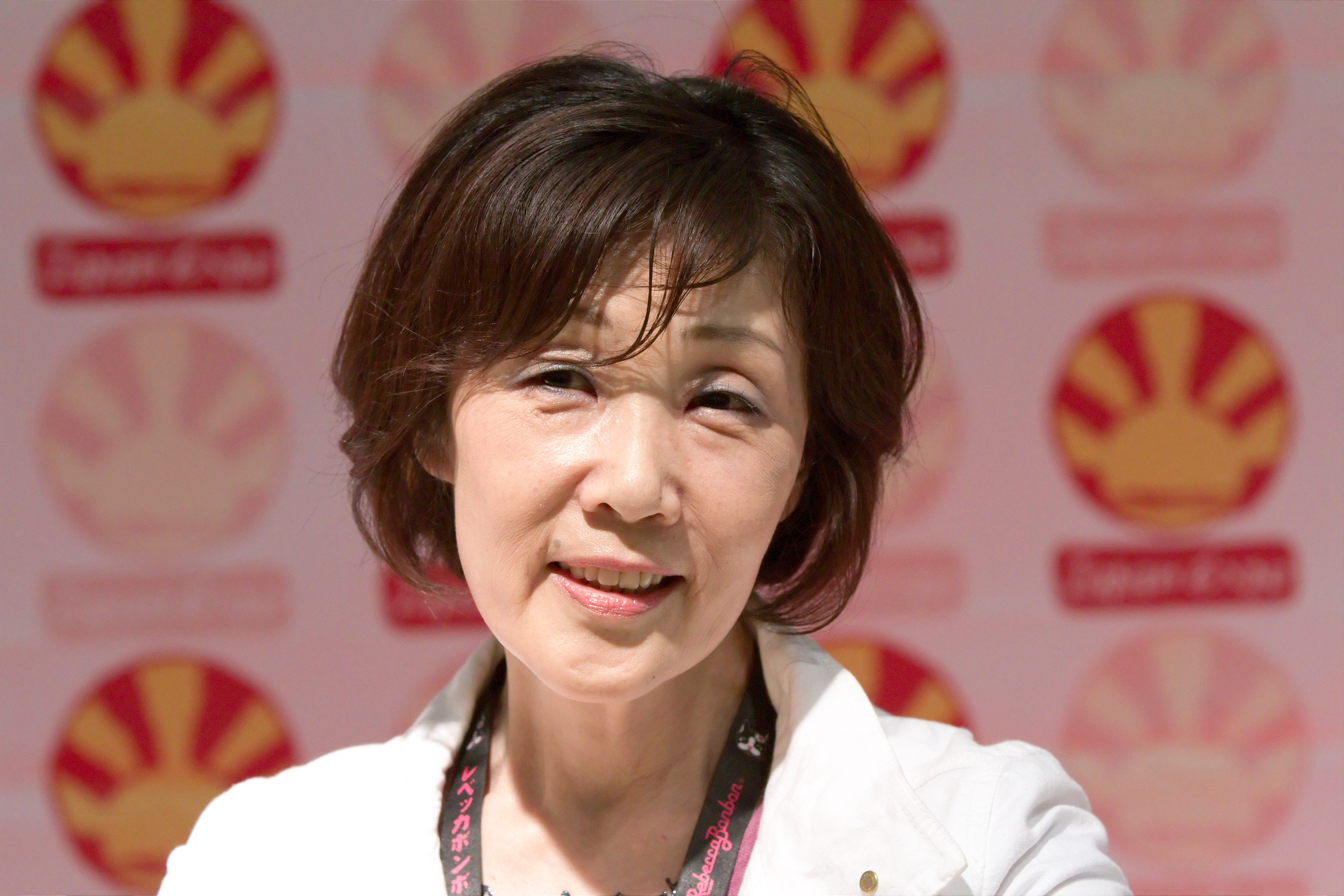
Yuko Shimizu, the original designer of Hello Kitty

In 1962, Shintaro Tsuji, founder of Sanrio, began selling rubber sandals with flowers painted on them. Tsuji noted the profits gained by adding a cute design to the shoes and hired cartoonists to design cute characters for his merchandise. Hello Kitty was designed by Yuko Shimizu and was added to the lineup of early Sanrio characters in 1974.

Hello Kitty was initially known only as "the white kitten with no name" (名前のない白い子猫). Shimizu got the name Kitty from Lewis Carroll's Through the Looking-Glass; during a scene early in the book, Alice plays with a cat she calls Kitty. Sanrio's motto is "social communication", and Tsuji wanted the brand name to reflect that by including a greeting. He first considered "Hi Kitty" before finally settling on "Hello Kitty", her current name. Sanrio decided to make Hello Kitty British because foreign countries, in particular Britain, were popular in Japan at the time of Hello Kitty's creation. Sanrio already had several characters set in the US, and it wanted Hello Kitty to be different.

In 1976, Setsuko Yonekubo temporarily took over as lead designer for Hello Kitty, after Shimizu left Sanrio. In 1980 Yuko Yamaguchi became lead designer and has remained in charge since. Yamaguchi has said that fashion, movies, and TV inspire her in creating new designs. New series involving Hello Kitty with different themed designs are released regularly, following current trends.

Spokespeople for Sanrio have said that Hello Kitty has no mouth, as they want people to "project their feelings onto the character" and "be happy or sad together with Hello Kitty." Another explanation Sanrio has given for Hello Kitty's lack of a mouth is that she "speaks from the heart. She's Sanrio's ambassador to the world and isn't bound to any particular language." However, Yuko Yamaguchi has also said that "Kitty has a mouth" that is "hidden in the fur". Representatives for Sanrio have said that they see Hello Kitty as a symbol of friendship, which they hope she will foster between people across the world. There has been speculation that Hello Kitty has her origins in Maneki Neko, a traditional Japanese cat figurine. The name "Hello Kitty" is a back-translation of Maneki Neko, meaning "beckoning cat" in English. Despite this, no definitive statement supports that speculation. Hello Kitty has also instead been put forth as an early example of mukokuseki, a Japanese term meaning "stateless" or "nationless" in reference to characters lacking any identifiable national background.

== History and reception ==
Hello Kitty first appeared on a vinyl coin purse sold in Japan in 1975.

The character's first appearance on an item was in March 1975 on a vinyl coin purse sold in Japan, where she was pictured sitting between a bottle of milk and a goldfish bowl. She first appeared in the United States in 1976 when Sanrio opened a Gift Gate store in San Jose, California.

Hello Kitty sold well immediately after her 1975 launch, and Sanrio's sales increased sevenfold. Due to Japan's growing economy, many Japanese children could afford to buy Hello Kitty products. Her popularity also grew with the emergence of kawaii culture, which embraces cuteness.

UNICEF named Hello Kitty as children's ambassador to the United States in 1983, children's ambassador in Japan in 1994, and gave her the title of UNICEF Special Friend of Children in 2004, a title unique to her.

Originally, Hello Kitty was only marketed towards a child and preteen audience. In the 1990s, the target market for Hello Kitty was broadened to include teenagers and adults as a retro brand. Marketing to those who could not get Hello Kitty merchandise as children, and those who fondly remember items they had, Sanrio began selling Hello Kitty branded products such as purses and laptops. The 1994–1996 Face series was the first to be designed specifically for mature consumers.

The Hello Kitty brand rose to greater prominence internationally during the late 1990s. At that time, several celebrities, such as Mariah Carey, had adopted Hello Kitty as a fashion statement. New products featuring the character were made available in a large variety of American department stores.

Hello Kitty's popularity in Japan peaked in the late 1990s when she was the country's top-grossing character. In 2002, Hello Kitty lost her place as the top-grossing character in Japan in the Character Databank popularity chart. In a 2010 survey, she was in third place behind Anpanman and Pikachu from Pokémon. In 2010, The New York Times attributed the character's relative decline in Japan to her biography not being "compelling enough to draw many fans." The newspaper later wrote that analysts called the characterization "weak", and that Hello Kitty not having a mouth has dampened her success as an animated TV character. According to Character Databank, Hello Kitty was the third highest-grossing character in Japan as of 2013. In 2019 and 2020, Character Databank ranked her fifth, and as of 2021, she was out of the top five.

Overseas, her global popularity has increased over the years. According to Sanrio, Hello Kitty was appearing on 12,000 new products each year as of 1999. Beginning in 2007, following trends in Japan, Sanrio began using darker designs for Hello Kitty with more black and less pink and pulled away from kawaii styles. By 2008, Hello Kitty was responsible for half of Sanrio's $1 billion net income, and there were over 50,000 different Hello Kitty branded products in more than 60 countries. By 2010 the character was worth $5 billion a year and The New York Times called her a "global marketing phenomenon". Worldwide annual sales reached $8 billion in 2013.

In July 2008, the Dutch artist Dick Bruna, creator of Miffy, alleged that Hello Kitty is a copy of Miffy, being rendered in a similar style. He stated disapprovingly in an interview for the British newspaper The Daily Telegraph: "That ... is a copy [of Miffy], I think. I don't like that at all. I always think, 'No, don't do that. Try to make something that you think of yourself'." Mercis, the firm that managed copyrights for Bruna, took Sanrio to court over their Hello Kitty-associated character Cathy, a rabbit which made her first appearance in 1976 and which Mercis argued infringed the copyright for Miffy. A court in Amsterdam ruled in favour of Mercis in November 2010 and ordered Sanrio to stop the production and sale of merchandise featuring Cathy in the Benelux countries. However, in June 2011, the two companies announced that they had reached a settlement agreement to end their legal dispute. Sanrio stopped using the Cathy character, and the two firms jointly donated €150,000 for reconstruction after the 2011 Tōhoku earthquake and tsunami.

As of 2014, 90% of the profits from Hello Kitty came from licensing of products for the international market. She has been particularly popular in other Asian countries for decades, such as in China, where her cultural impact is comparable to that of Barbie in the Western world. In 2008, Japan named Hello Kitty the ambassador of Japanese tourism in both China and Hong Kong, marking the first time Japan's tourism ministry had appointed a fictional character to the role. Sharon Kinsella, a lecturer at Oxford University on Japanese sociology, called the selection of Hello Kitty "a bit farcical ... as if a dumbed-down cultural icon ... can somehow do something significant to alter the gnarly and difficult state of China–Japan relations."

In the United States, Hello Kitty is recognized by more than 80% of young adults in the 18–23 age group, as of 2016. In 2014 a four-day convention, Hello Kitty Con in Los Angeles, attracted over 25,000 visitors. The convention was held in celebration of Hello Kitty's 40th anniversary. Sanrio's Puroland Tokyo theme park also held a celebration spanning several days in November 2014.

== Character ==
Hello Kitty is a gijinka, an anthropomorphism or personification of a Japanese Bobtail cat. Official character profiles list her full name as Kitty White (キティ・ホワイト, Kiti Howaito), born in the suburbs of London, England, on November 1. Her height is described as five apples and her weight as three apples. She is portrayed as a bright and kind-hearted girl, very close to her twin sister Mimmy. She is good at baking cookies and loves her mama's homemade apple pie. She likes to play the piano and collect cute things, and her favorite subjects in school are English, music, and art.

Hello Kitty is portrayed with a large family with the surname White. Her twin sister Mimmy is described as "shy and very girly", interested in sewing and dreaming of marriage. While Hello Kitty wears a red bow on her left ear, Mimmy wears a yellow one on her right. Their papa George is described as dependable, humorous but also absent-minded. Their mama Mary is portrayed as a good cook who loves doing housework. Grandpa Anthony likes to tell stories and grandma Margaret likes sewing. In addition to family, Hello Kitty is also depicted with several animal friends, including the mice Joey and Judy, the bears Tippy and Thomas, the raccoon Tracy and the squirrel Rorry.

Aside from the core Hello Kitty characters, several spinoff characters have been created: Hello Kitty's boyfriend Dear Daniel in 1999, Charmmy Kitty, Hello Kitty's pet cat, and Sugar, her pet hamster, both in 2004, and her superhero alter-ego Ichigoman in 2011.

SFGATE said in 2004 that in light of the level of success of Hello Kitty, her fictional biography "seems almost too modest – or irrelevant" and "doesn't seem to have played much of a part" in the success.

In 2014 an anthropologist was told by Sanrio that Kitty White was not simply a cat (i.e. "depicted on all fours"), describing her as a little English girl called Kitty White, from outside London. Following reports that interpreted this to mean she was human, a Sanrio PR representative said that the organization had "never said she was a human", explaining anthropomorphization by comparing the character to Mickey Mouse: "No one would mistake the Disney character for a human–but at the same time he's not quite a mouse. Just like Hello Kitty isn't a human, she's not quite a cat either." Sanrio stated further, "Hello Kitty was done in the motif of a cat. It's going too far to say that Hello Kitty is not a cat."

== Media ==
=== Animated series ===
There have been several different animated series starring Hello Kitty. The first was Hello Kitty's Furry Tale Theater, an animated television series with 13 22-minute episodes that premiered in 1987. The next, an OVA titled Hello Kitty and Friends, spanned 30 entries originally released in Japan between 1989 and 1994. Hello Kitty's Paradise came out in 1999 and was 16 episodes long. Hello Kitty's Stump Village came out in 2005, and The Adventures of Hello Kitty & Friends came out in 2008 and has aired 52 episodes. A crossover series under the name Kiss Hello Kitty (that paired animated versions of the members of the rock band Kiss with Hello Kitty) was announced in March 2013. Produced by Gene Simmons, this show was supposed to air on The Hub Network (now Discovery Family), but it never came to fruition.

Hello Kitty's Paradise was a long-running live-action children's program that aired on TV Tokyo from January 1999 to March 2011. It was the longest-running weekly kids' television program in the network's history. In January 2011, the show's creators mutually agreed to end the series after twelve seasons, with the final episode being broadcast on 29 March 2011.

In August 2018, Sanrio began streaming a CGI animated series on YouTube. It features Hello Kitty talking to the camera about her life in the style of vlogging YouTubers.

Sanrio began streaming the newest 2D animated Hello Kitty series Hello Kitty and Friends Supercute Adventures on YouTube on 26 October 2020.

=== Comics ===
Hello Kitty had two Japanese comic series serialized in Ribon, a shōjo manga magazine - Hello Kitty Doki (ran from May 2007 to April 2008) and Hello Kitty Peace (released in June 2008).

In March 2016, Sanrio launched a webcomic featuring Hello Kitty as a strawberry-themed superhero called Ichigoman (ichigo meaning strawberry). The webcomic is created by Toshiki Inoue and Shakua Sinkai and updates once a month. Ichigoman first appeared in 2011 in an exhibition with Yuko Yamaguchi's art.

=== Music ===
Hello Kitty has her own branded album, Hello World, featuring Hello Kitty-inspired songs performed by a collection of artists including Keke Palmer, Cori Yarckin, and Ainjel Emme under Hello Kitty's Lakeshore Records record label. Hello Kitty was also chosen by AH Software to be the basis of the new Vocaloid Nekomura Iroha (猫村いろは, Nekomura Iroha) to celebrate the 50th anniversary of Sanrio.

Musician Yoshiki unveiled the Hello Kitty theme song "Hello Hello" in November 2014 at the first Hello Kitty Con. Yoshiki, who was the first celebrity to have his own Hello Kitty doll, Yoshikitty, was approached by Yamaguchi to compose the song seven years prior.

=== Video games ===
There have been numerous Hello Kitty games starting with the release of the first title for the Famicom in 1992; however, the majority of these games were never released outside of Japan. Hello Kitty also has made cameo appearances in games featuring other Sanrio characters, such as the Keroppi game, Kero Kero Keroppi no Bōken Nikki: Nemureru Mori no Keroleen. Special-edition consoles such as the Hello Kitty Dreamcast, Hello Kitty Game Boy Pocket, and Hello Kitty Crystal Xbox have also been released exclusively in Japan.

Hello Kitty appeared as a guest character in Sega's Sonic Dash in 2016, as part of Sega's partnership with Sanrio. Hello Kitty and My Melody (another Sanrio character) appeared together in Super Mario Maker as unlockable Mystery Mushroom costumes. Hello Kitty appears as a playable character via downloadable content (DLC) in Super Monkey Ball Banana Mania. A costume based on Hello Kitty, as well as a Hello Kitty-inspired costume known as "Cutest Friend", were available as rewards in Fall Guys as part of the first Season 4: Creative Construction Fame Pass. Hello Kitty will appear as a playable character via DLC in Sonic Racing: CrossWorlds, alongside Kuromi and a Sanrio themed race track.

==== Partial list of Hello Kitty video games ====
- Hello Kitty: World (1992, Famicom): A port of Balloon Kid developed by Nintendo and published by Sanrio subsidiary Character Soft
- Hello Kitty no Ohanabatake (1992, Famicom): A platformer
- Hello Kitty's Big Fun Piano (1994, PC): A piano simulation
- Kitty the Kool (1998, PlayStation) A game from Imagineer
- Hello Kitty's Cube Frenzy (1998, Game Boy Color, PlayStation): A life simulation/minigame collection
- DDR Hello Kitty (1999, Bemani Pocket): A handheld Hello Kitty game in the Dance Dance Revolution series
- The Hello Kitty Simple 1500 series (PlayStation): A series of specifically low-priced games
- Hello Kitty no Garden Panic (1999, Dreamcast)
- Hello Kitty no Lovely Fruit Park (1999, Dreamcast)
- Hello Kitty no Magical Block (2000, Dreamcast)
- Hello Kitty no Waku Waku Cookies (2000, Dreamcast)
- Gotouchi Hello Kitty Sugoroku Monogatari (2003, PlayStation): A sugoroku-based game
- Hello Kitty: Happy Party Pals (2005, Game Boy Advance): An action/adventure game
- Hello Kitty: Roller Rescue (2005, Xbox, GameCube, PlayStation 2): An action/adventure game
- Mainichi Suteki! Hello Kitty no Life Kit (2007, Nintendo DS): A puzzle game
- The Hello Kitty Simple 2000 series (2007, PlayStation 2): A series of specifically low-priced games
- Hello Kitty: Big City Dreams (2008, Nintendo DS): An adventure game published by Empire Interactive developed by Sanrio Digital. In the game, Hello Kitty moves to the Big City where she meets other Sanrio characters and makes new friends.
- Hello Kitty Daily (2008, Nintendo DS): A PDA application featuring a diary, calendar, alarm clock, money managing system and school planner
- Hello Kitty Online (2008, PC): An online MMORPG developed by Sanrio Digital and Typhoon Games. The game allows players to create and customize characters, then use them to battle monsters, socialize with one another, mine for ore, do domestic chores like farming or cooking, and participate in quests.
- Hello Kitty Puzzle Party (2009, PlayStation Portable): A compilation puzzle game bundled with a clock and calendar tool
- Hello Kitty Parachute Paradise (2009, iPhone/iPod Touch): A game with tilt-based controls
- Apron of Magic (2010, Arcade, iOS, Nintendo 3DS): A card game developed by Examu to commemorate the 50th Anniversary of Sanrio. The game features Hello Kitty and other notable Sanrio Characters.
- Hello Kitty Seasons (2010, Wii): A game in which the playable character is appointed as Deputy Mayor to help Sanrio Town
- Hello Kitty Cafe (2012, iOS): A café simulation game
- Hello Kitty Picnic (2012, Nintendo 3DS)
- Hello Kitty Kruisers (2014, iOS, Wii U, Nintendo Switch): A kart racing game featuring Hello Kitty and other Sanrio characters
- Hello Kitty Dream Cafe (2017, Android, iOS): A café simulation game
- Hello Kitty and Friends: Happiness Parade (2022, iOS and Android; 2023, Switch): A rhythm game. The mobile versions are Netflix exclusives.
- Hello Kitty Island Adventure (2023, Apple Arcade; 2025, Nintendo Switch, PC, PlayStation 5, Nintendo Switch 2): A cozy social simulation game taking place on an island visited by various Sanrio characters. The game won the Apple Arcade Game of the Year award in 2023.
- Hello Kitty Skyland (2025, Quest 2, Meta Quest Pro, Meta Quest 3): A social virtual reality game
- Hello Kitty Party Land (2026, Nintendo Switch, Nintendo Switch 2): A multiplayer party game

=== Films ===
Three Hello Kitty anime films were released in Japan. Hello Kitty: Cinderella released in 1989, Hello Kitty no Oyayubi Hime released in 1990, and Hello Kitty no Mahō no Mori no Ohime-sama released in 1991.

On 3 July 2015, Sanrio announced a full-length animated Hello Kitty theatrical feature film initially planned for 2019. In early 2019, it was revealed that New Line Cinema would be teaming up alongside Sanrio and FlynnPictureCo. for an "English language film based on the venerable kid brand." In 2021, it was reported that Jennifer Coyle and Leo Matsuda had been hired to direct the film with Lindsey Beer set to pen the script. In October 2025, a release date was set for 21 July 2028. In May 2026, David Derrick Jr. and John Aoshima were announced as the new directors, with Jeff Chan writing on a screenplay based on previous drafts that included Beer's.

== Products ==
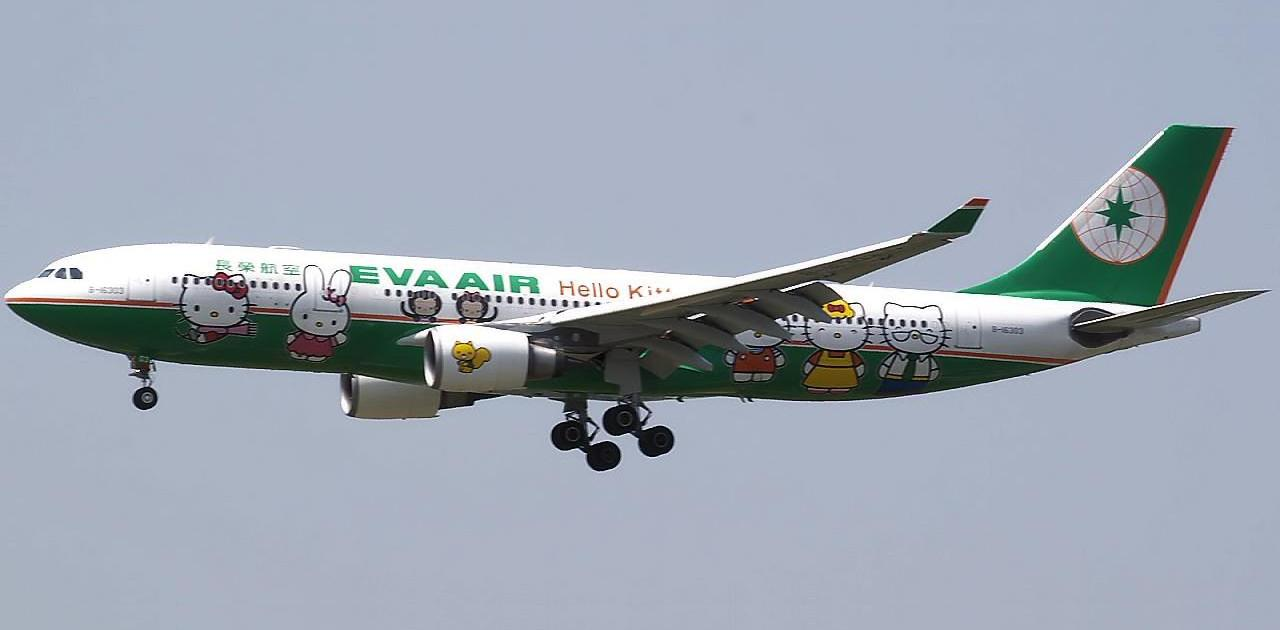
The Hello Kitty Airbus A330-200 flown by EVA Air

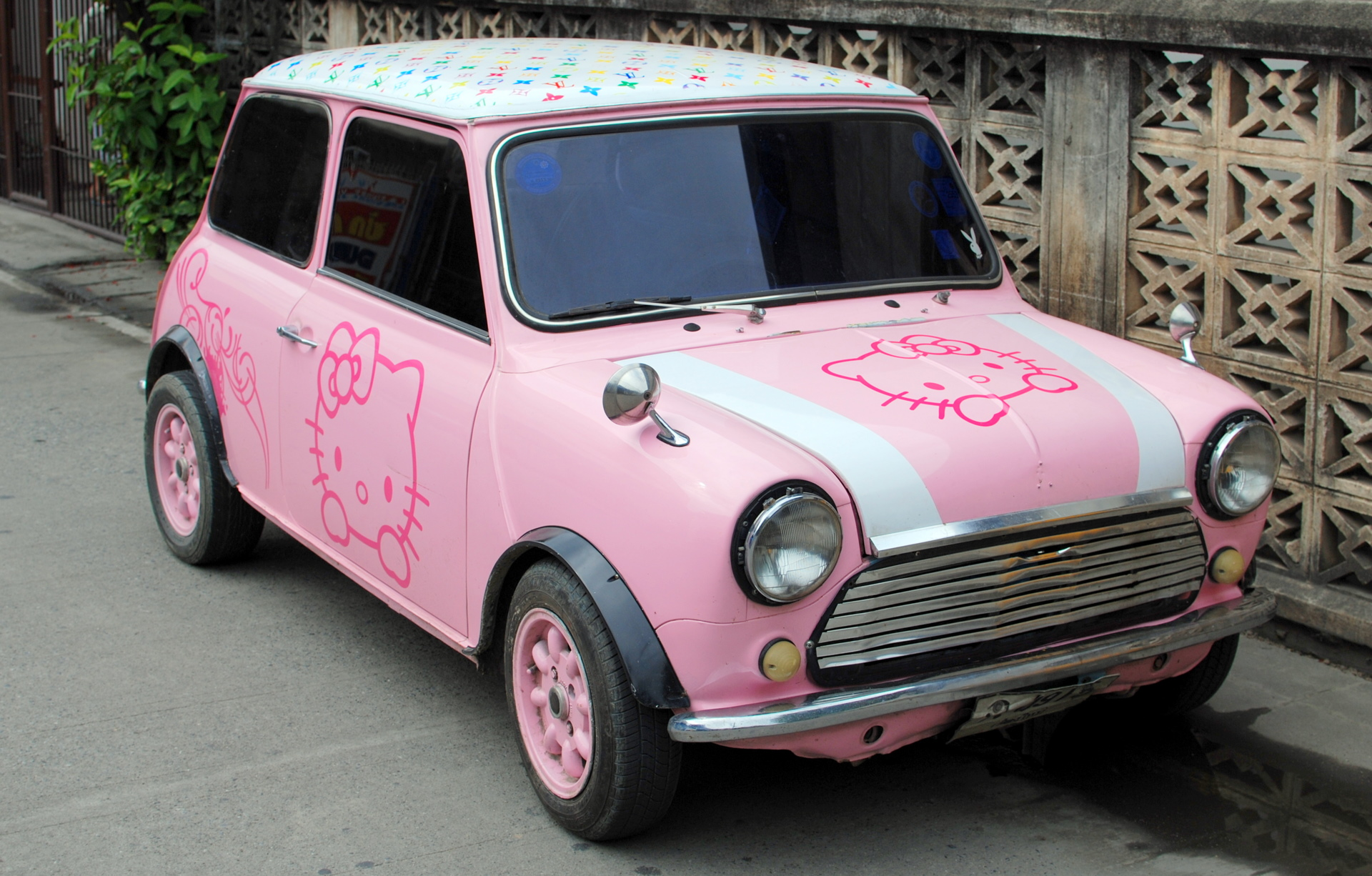
Louis Vuitton Hello Kitty Mini

Originally aimed at the pre-adolescent female market, the Hello Kitty product range has expanded from dolls, stickers, greeting cards, board games, clothes, backpacks, lunch boxes, piggy banks, pencils, erasers, accessories, school supplies and stationery to purses, toasters, televisions, other home appliances, massagers, motor oil and computer equipment. These products range from mass market items to high-end consumer products and rare collectibles. As of 2014, more than 50,000 Hello Kitty product lines were available in over 130 countries.

=== High-end ===
Sanrio and various corporate partners have released Hello Kitty-branded products, including the Hello Kitty Stratocaster electric guitar (since 2005, with Fender, under its Squier sub-brand, in the US) and an Airbus A330-200 commercial passenger jet airliner, dubbed the Hello Kitty Jet (2005–2009, with EVA Airways in Taiwan). In late 2011 and early 2012, EVA Air revived their "Hello Kitty Jets" with their three new A330-300s. However, due to high demand, the airline added two more alongside their existing A330-200s in mid-2012. A year later, EVA Air introduced one of their 777-300ERs as another Hello Kitty Jet, which featured other Sanrio characters as well as Hello Kitty.

In 2009, Hello Kitty entered the wine market with a collection of four wines available for purchase online. The collection included a sparkling rosé, a sparkling white wine, a red wine, and a white wine, each adorned with Hello Kitty branding and packaging. This venture marked a strategic move to expand the product lines targeted at older audiences, combining the iconic character's charm with the sophistication of wine.

=== Establishments ===
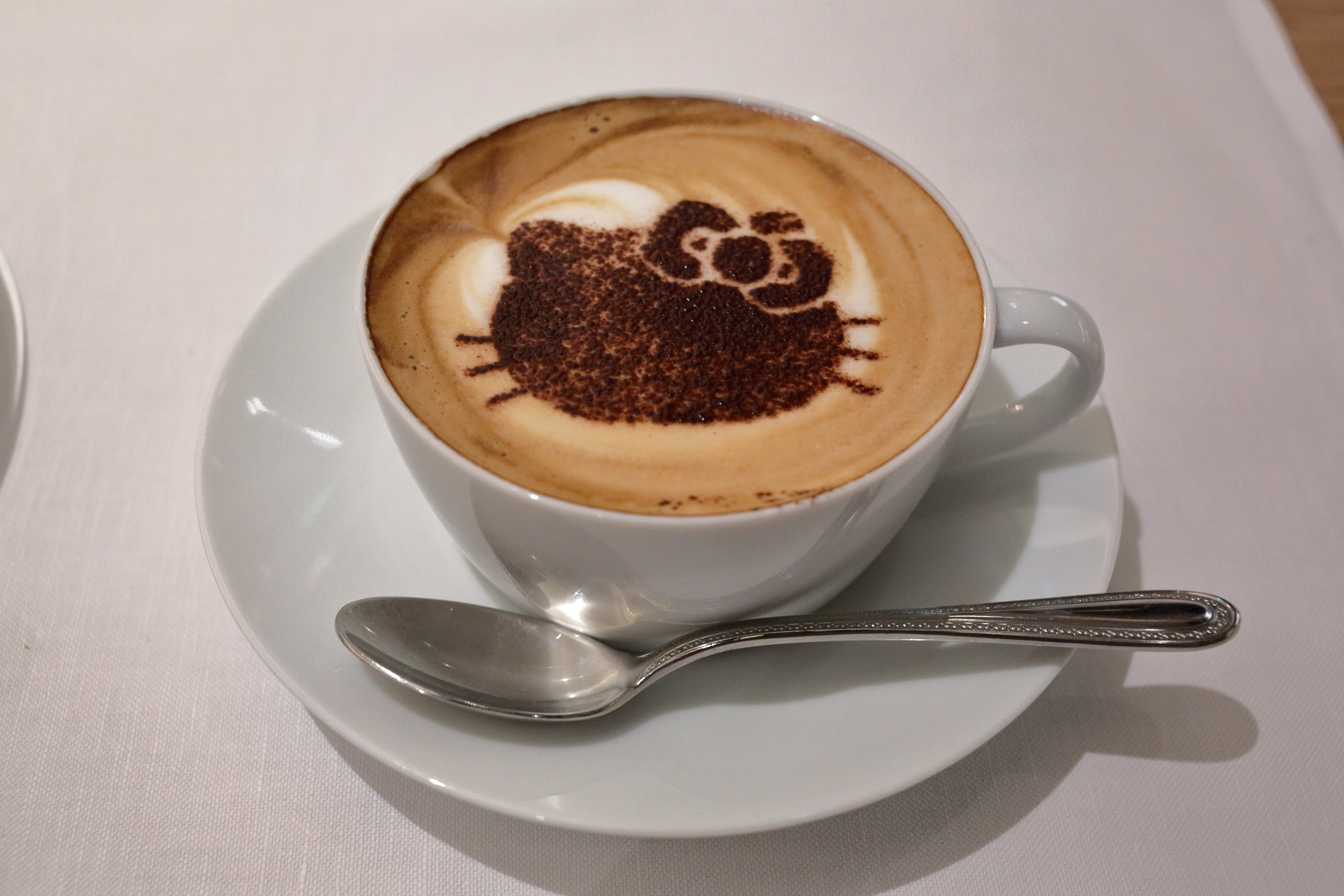
Hello Kitty coffee

Hello Kitty is included as part of the Sanrio livery at the Japanese theme parks Harmonyland and Sanrio Puroland. The Hello Kitty Shanghai Times theme park in Shanghai, China opened in 2019. A theme park called Hello Kitty Town existed in Iskandar Puteri, Johor, Malaysia from 2012 to 2019. In 2014, Sanrio partnered with the Indonesian theme park Dufan to introduce Hello Kitty Adventure, a cinema based attraction.

Hello Kitty cafés have opened around the world, including in Seoul and other locations in South Korea; Bangkok, Thailand; Adelaide, Australia; Irvine, California; the Santa Anita Mall in California, and the Park MGM in Las Vegas, Nevada.

There is a themed restaurant named Hello Kitty Sweets in Taipei, Taiwan, which opened in 2008. The restaurant's decor and many of its dishes are patterned after the Hello Kitty characters. Another restaurant called the Hello Kitty Diner opened in the Chatswood area of Sydney, Australia, and a Hello Kitty dim sum restaurant opened in Kowloon, Hong Kong.

In 2008, a Hello Kitty-themed maternity hospital opened in Yuanlin, Taiwan. Hello Kitty is featured on the receiving blankets, room decor, bed linens, birth certificate covers, and nurses' uniforms. The hospital's owner explained that he hoped that the theme would help ease the stress of childbirth.

=== Clothing ===
Dr. Martens collaborated with Hello Kitty in 2010 and 2020. The 2020 collaboration includes platform boots, platform sandals as well as a satchel. Forever 21 collaborated with Hello Kitty on clothing collections several times, the first one in 2011. In 2018, Puma collaborated with Hello Kitty to create a collection which features sneakers for both children and adults. In 2018, and again in 2026, Converse collaborated with Sanrio to create a collection which includes shoes ranging from kids' to adult sizes. In 2020, Skechers collaborated with Hello Kitty releasing chunky-soled style shoes with brand's logo and Hello Kitty's face and bow. Hello Kitty is used as a brand for sanitary pads in Asia and Latin America.

== Legacy and impact ==
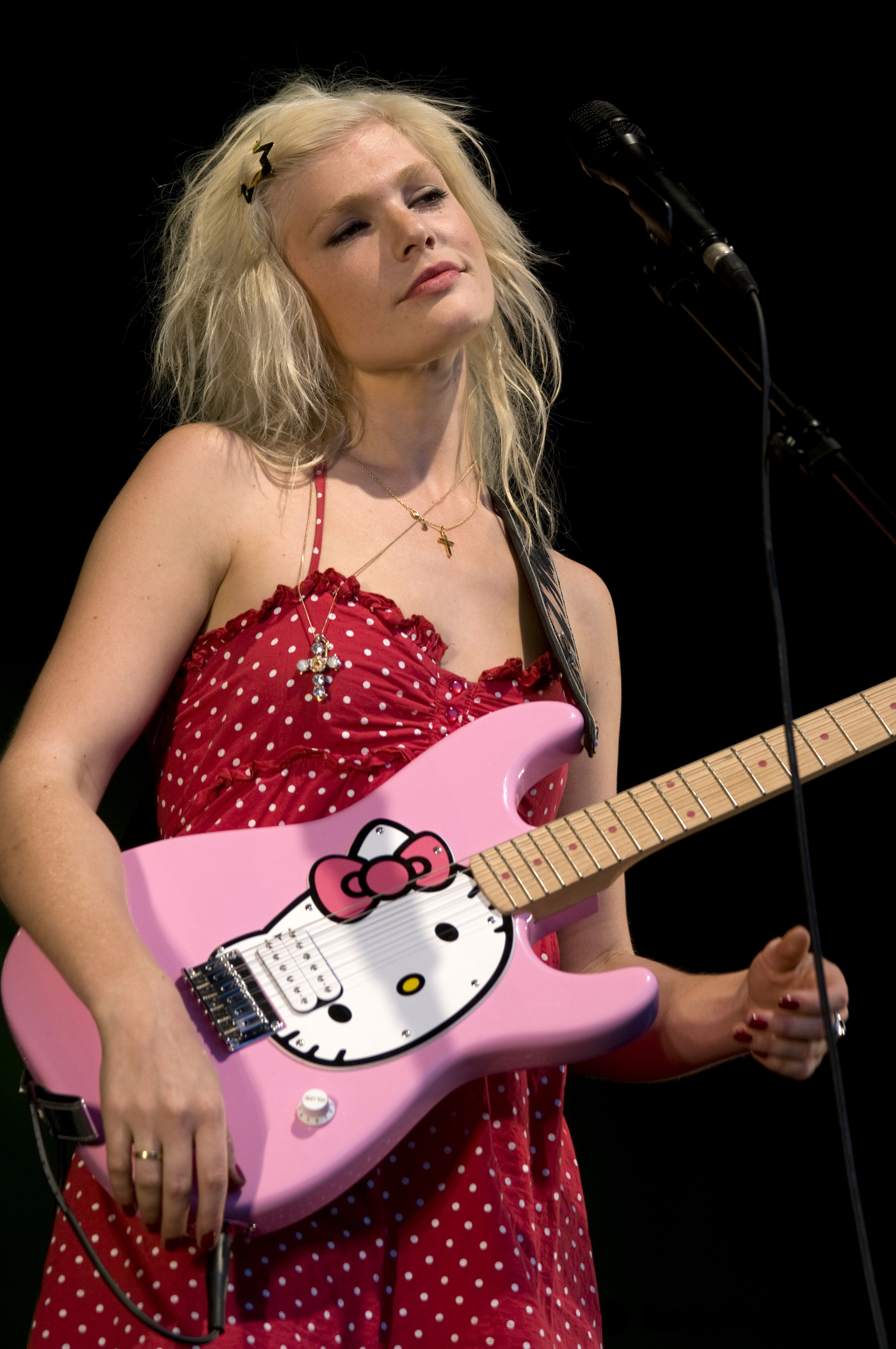
Singer-songwriter Micky Green with a Hello Kitty Stratocaster guitar

In 1994, artist Tom Sachs was invited to create a scene for Barneys New York Christmas displays and titled it Hello Kitty Nativity. In the scene, the Virgin Mary was replaced by Madonna with an open Chanel bra, the three Kings were all Bart Simpson, the stable was marked by a McDonald's logo, and the Christ Child was replaced by Hello Kitty. This contemporary revision of the nativity scene demonstrated Sachs' interest in the phenomena of consumerism, branding, and the cultural fetishization of products. Many audiences instead took offense to the artwork, which received backlash from Catholic organizations for its misuse of Christian symbolism.

In 2009, Tom Sachs' Bronze Collection was shown at the Public art space in Manhattan's Lever House, as well as in the Baldwin Gallery in Aspen, Colorado, and the Trocadéro in Paris. The collection featured white bronze casts of a foam core Hello Kitty sculpture – a style distinctive to the artist. As of April 2010, the Wind-Up Hello Kitty sculpture is still on display at Lever House. Although Sachs did not seek permission to use the character in his work, a brand marketing manager for Sanrio was quoted as saying "You know, there was Marilyn Monroe and Andy Warhol, and then Michael Jackson and Jeff Koons. When you're an icon, that's what happens." In 2013 The Wall Street Journal said Sanrio's attitude to copyright was "laissez-faire" compared to companies like Disney, and that they have let artists use Hello Kitty's likeness without interfering.

In 2015, a nine-foot tall pearlescent Hello Kitty sculpture by artist Sebastian Masuda was exhibited at the Dag Hammarskjöld Plaza in New York City, as part of the Japan Society's exhibition: Life of Cats: Selections from the Hiraki Ukiyo-e Collection.

Canadian singer-songwriter Avril Lavigne wrote and recorded a song called "Hello Kitty" for her fifth studio album, Avril Lavigne, released in 2013. The Hello Kitty Stratocaster guitar, originally released in 2005, was initially aimed at pre-teen girls, but has since been used by notable guitarists including Krist Novoselic, Courtney Love, Dave Navarro, and Lisa Loeb. In 2022, vintage Hello Kitty Stratocasters were among the most popular musical instruments sold on the marketplace Reverb.com. While it originally retailed for $230, some re-sold for over $1,000.

In 2022, Saturday Night Live aired a sketch parodying Hello Kitty's backstory (described by The A.V. Club as "incongruous, corporate-sanctioned") and Sanrio's handling of it. The sketch centers on managers at a fictional Hello Kitty store. They describe the character in contradictory terms as a "human little girl" who is in third grade and also 48 years old. The Atlantic described the sketch as both "a skewering of the ever-expanding Hello Kitty commercial universe" and as capturing the gaslighting and manipulation of truth of the time.
