= Winifred Austen =

British artist and illustrator

Winifred Maria Louise Austen (12 July 1876 – 1 November 1964) was an English illustrator, painter, etcher and aquatint engraver, particularly known for her detailed depictions of small mammals and birds.

== Early years and education ==
Born in Ramsgate, Kent, in 1876, her parents were Josiah Austin, a Cornish naval surgeon, and Fanny (née Mann) Austin. Her father eventually went on to become a doctor in London. She attended the London County Council School of Arts and Crafts, where she was taught by Cuthbert Edmund Swan, an animal painter. Austen also took private lessions with the artist Louise Jopling.

== Career ==
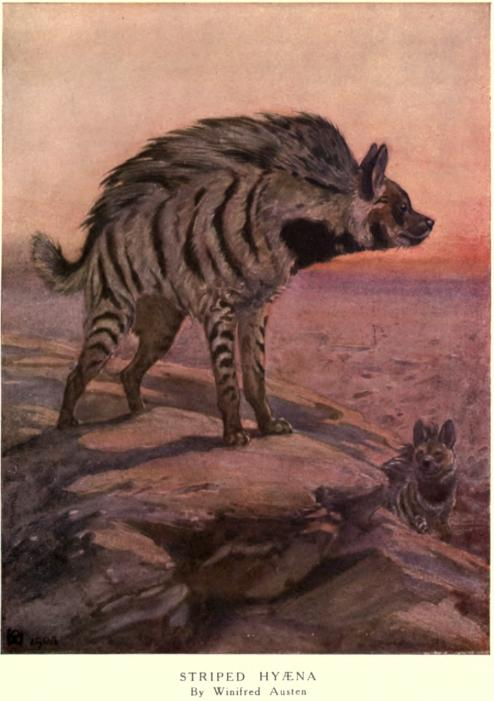
Hyena

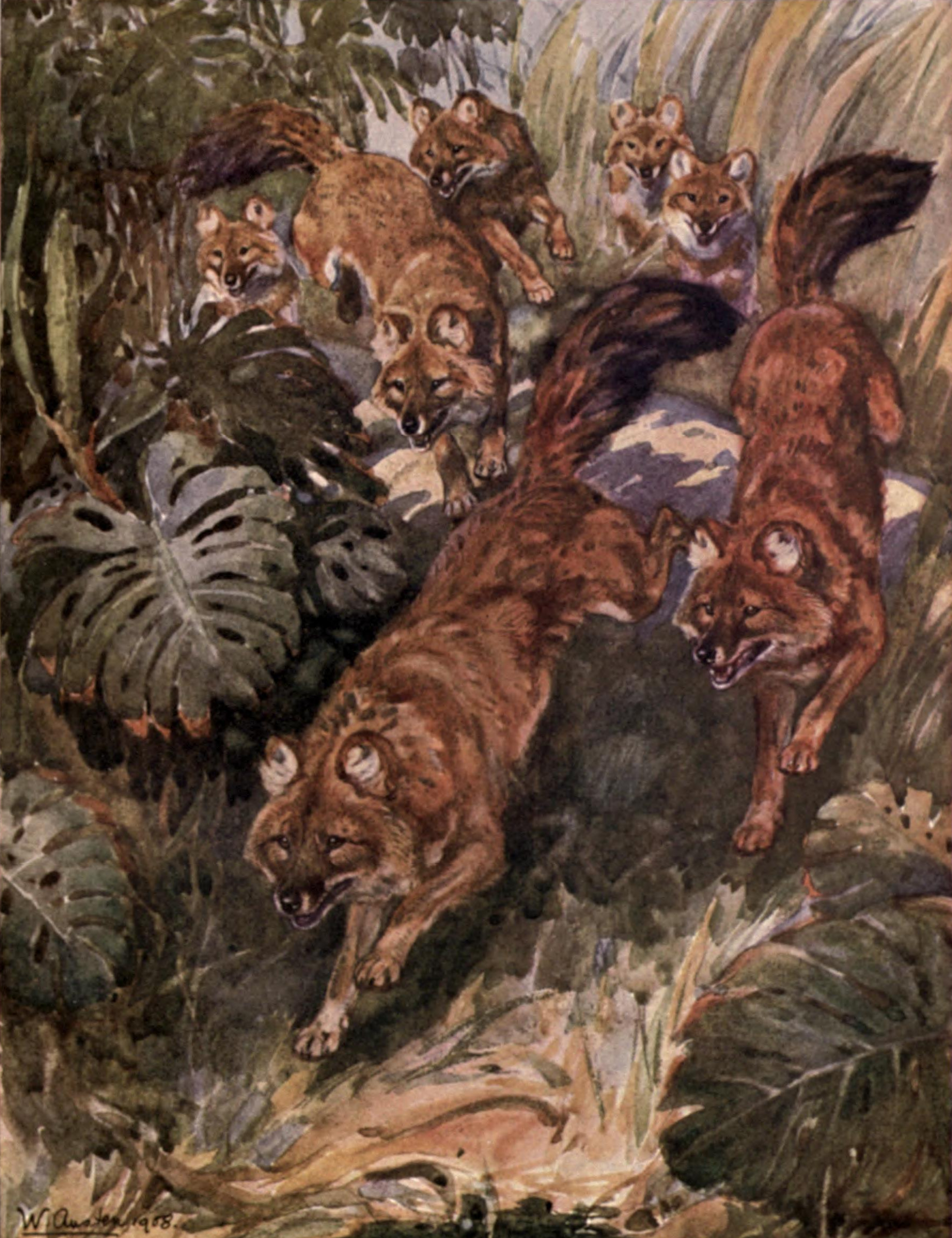
Dholes pack

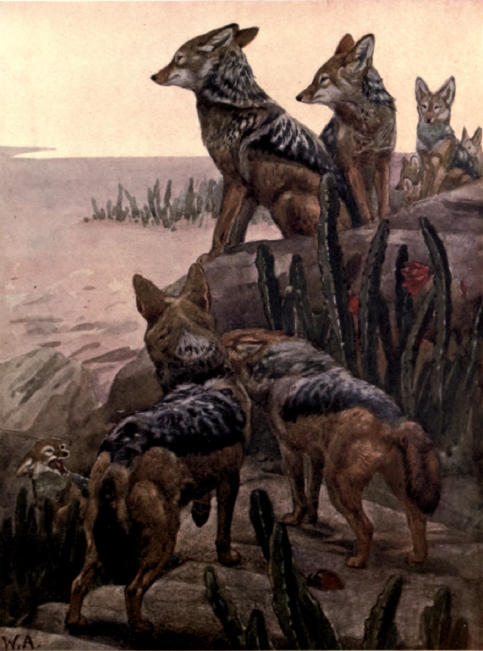
Jackals

Austen's favorite subjects were wild animals and birds, and she received many commissions to illustrate magazines and books. Her etchings of animals and birds were popular in the 1940s and 1950s. At the Royal Academy in London in 1903, she exhibited "The Day of Reckoning", a wolf pursued by hunters through a forest in snow. A second showed a snow scene with a wolf baying, while two others are apparently listening to him. "While the wolf, in nightly prowl, bays the moon with hideous howl," is the legend with the picture. In 1908 Austen exhibited four works at the Royal Academy, ‘Brutus: Portrait of a Lion’, ‘The Dog and the Shadow’, ‘The Fox and the Stork’, and ‘The Wolf and the Lamb’.

Austen exhibited regularly at the annual exhibition of the Royal Society of Painter Etchers, and in 1922, she was elected a member of that society. Austen's early plates were overloaded with background, which the artist ultimately completely discarded. The Little Egret is lost in its surroundings. The plate lacked atmosphere, however much it may have appealed to the ornithologist. The otherwise nicely done Country Mouse suffered from the same fault. Austen was overly engrossed in the animals such that her work upon branches, leaves and blossoms demonstrated signs of a weakened interest. She was also not at her best when drawing exotic birds or beasts, such as a stork or a bear. The Belgian Hare and the Rabbit are works of a middle period. While the Rabbit is considered the finer of the two. Austen, without over-labouring her plate, adopted a severe method for some of her strokes. Austen etched two game birds, the Little jap and A Surrey Fowl. The first is considered good, the second bears comparison with Félix Bracquemond's work. Austen's etched line was bold and firm, with an absence of fumbling and indecision. The drypoints were her most recent works. Austen came under the inspiration of the Japanese. A drawing by Keibun Ōta in the British Museum of mallard flying by moonlight may be compared with Austen's Mallard Pitching. Mallard Rising deals with a similar subject. Widgeon in Winter and A Little Covey are considered good drypoints, the latter showing strong Japanese influence. Austen was elected to the Society of Women Artists (1902), the Royal Society of Painter-Etchers and Engravers (1907), the Royal Institute of Painters in Water Colours (1933), and from 1903, she was a fellow of the Royal Zoological Society.

== Artwork ==
Austen painted many species of animals. She specialized in small mammals and aviaries. Being very precise in the details of her subjects, she was also very distinctive in the environment surrounding them. Going in depth on the colors of the leaves in the season she was inspired by adding in hundreds of buds to the tree that her subject was sitting in.

Her style of artwork varied drastically. She loved to watercolor, paint with oil-based paints, and etch. Her artwork can be seen in beautiful vibrant colors to detailed grayscale etches. Most of her artwork shows the animals in day-to-day life, in which they are seen as harvesting food, grouped together in a community, flying in the sky, or hunting for food. This is unique to most artists at that time because she created images of her subjects in motion, not in a stand-still position. This helps the subjects and the environment interact with each other and feel fluid, even though it is a basic 2d etch or painting.

One of her more detailed artwork, "Zebra Finches", shows how in depth she went with not only the subjects, but the environment too. The necks of the birds are finely lined black and white. There is detail and texture, to show individual feathers in their breasts and spots on their wings and tails. Not only are the birds painted with such detail, but the environment is too. The tree that the finches are on have leaves and flowers, in which you can see each leaf and petal distinctly.

== Personal life ==
Austen married her agent Oliver O'Donnell Frick in 1917 and was widowed in 1923. Her work was also part of the painting event in the art competition at the 1948 Summer Olympics. Austen became involved with the Royal Society for the Protection of Birds and the Havergate Island Bird Sanctuary in Suffolk. She worked hand in hand to try to protect hundreds of species of birds around the United Kingdom.

In 1926 Austen moved to a cottage in Suffolk where she remained for the rest of her life. She died at Bickley, in 1964.

== Books illustrated ==
- A Book of Dogs by E Nesbit, 1898, published by Dent
- At the Zoo by A Cooke, 1920, published by Nelson
- Field, River and Hill by E Parker, 1927, published by Allan
- Marsh and Mud Flat by K Dawson, 1931, published by Country Life
- Just an Oridinary Shoot, 1935, Country Life
- Birds Ashore and Aforeshore by P Chalmers, 1935, published by Collins.
