= Balloon Kid =

1990 video game

- North American cover art
- Developer: Nintendo R&D1 (Note: With assistance from Pax Softnica)
- Publishers: Nintendo; Character Soft (Hello Kitty World)
- Director: Yoshio Sakamoto
- Producer: Gunpei Yokoi
- Programmers: Takayuki Onodera; Hideo Suzuki; Motoo Yasuma
- Composer: Hirokazu Tanaka
- Series: Balloon Fight
- Platforms: Game Boy, Family Computer, Game Boy Color
- Release: Balloon Kid: NA: October 1990; EU: January 31, 1991; Hello Kitty World: JP: March 27, 1992; Balloon Fight GB: JP: July 31, 2000
- Genre: Platformer
- Modes: Single-player, multiplayer

Balloon Kid is a 1990 platform game developed and published by Nintendo for the Game Boy. It was released in October 1990 in North America and in January 1991 in Europe. It is the sequel to Balloon Fight. It was never released in Japan for the original Game Boy, but two years after its original release, a licensed Family Computer port titled Hello Kitty World (ハローキティワールド, Harō Kiti Wārudo) was reprogrammed and released by Sanrio's subsidiary Character Soft exclusively in Japan on March 27, 1992. A Game Boy Color edition with a few new features titled Balloon Fight GB (バルーンファイトGB, Barūn Faito GB) was released in Japan on July 31, 2000.

== Gameplay ==
The player has to make Alice collect balloons while avoiding enemies.

In 1-player mode, the gameplay is an arrangement of the Balloon Trip mode of Balloon Fight, where the screen automatically scrolls toward the left, while the player controls Alice who uses two balloons to float into the air with. To make her float in the air, the player must press (and sometimes hold) the A button to make her wave her arms to hover upward. Alice also has the ability to remove her balloons and walk on the ground, as well as jumping. If both of her balloons are popped or removed, and if she lands safely, she can inflate two new balloons and fly again.

The object of this mode is to travel from the beginning to the end while collecting balloons left by Alice's brother, Jim, along the way. The player must also prevent Alice from bumping into enemies that are attempting to pop her balloons, push her or kill her altogether. Some enemies, such as Balloon Birds, came from Balloon Fight. The giant fish that eats anyone who flies too close to the water also came from Balloon Fight. There are four bosses in Balloon Kid. To defeat them, the player must make Alice fly about them and make her detach her balloons to bounce on them. She also can jump and stomp on them, whenever it is safe for her, like in other typical platformers.

The 2-player mode is loosely based on Balloon Fight's Game A and Game B modes, where one player battles against another player. One player controls Alice, while the other controls Alice's friend and eternal rival: Samm. The goal is to collect more balloons than the other player before they arrive at the end of the stage.

Balloon Kid's "Balloon Trip" mode is based on Balloon Fight's mode of the same name, but with Alice instead of a Balloon Fighter. Everything else, including the BGM itself, are unchanged from Balloon Fight's Balloon Trip mode.

== Plot and setting ==
=== Setting ===
Balloon Kid takes place in a small part of an unnamed, Earth-like world. The only city in this part of the world is a town known as Pencilvania, a little town with pencil-shaped skyscrapers. Other places in this part of the world are these unnamed locations in order of appearance: a forest, an ocean with a giant whale, an icy mountain, and an industrial building. The first place a player starts from is a small house in a rural part of Pencilvania. There lived a brother and sister who loved to play with balloons. Alice and her younger brother, Jim, would spend endless days filling the skies with their balloons.

One day, Jim filled all his balloons and tied them together to make a beautiful balloon rainbow across the sky. Alice said: "What a great idea this was, Jim, but please be careful!". Just then, a strong wind blew and Jim was carried away into the sky. "Oh, no! This is terrible, I must save Jim!", thought Alice. Meanwhile, Jim, who was a very clever boy, thought, "I wonder how Alice will find me.........Wait! I've got an idea. I'll leave a trail of balloons for Alice to follow!".

=== Characters ===
- Alice - the protagonist of Balloon Kid, she must save her brother Jim from tragedy. Player 1 controls her in all three modes.
- Jim - Alice's mischievous younger brother who accidentally flew away in a bunch of balloons while he was making a balloon rainbow across the sky.
- Samm - Alice's frenemy. Player 2 controls him in 2-Player mode.

== Ports and related releases ==
Hello Kitty World cover art

On March 27, 1992, a subsidiary of Hello Kitty creator Sanrio, known as Character Soft, reprogrammed and published a Family Computer version of Balloon Kid, titled as Hello Kitty World (ハロー キティ ワールド). This version was released in Japan, where Balloon Kid was not. Balloon Kid was created after it was brought to North America. The notable changes to the game were Balloon Kid's plot being replaced with Hello Kitty's, as well as updated/changed visuals.

On July 31, 2000, Balloon Kid was remade and renamed as Balloon Fight GB (バルーンファイトGB, Barūn Faito GB), and was also developed by Pax Softnica and published by Nintendo, but released in Japan for the Game Boy Color through the Nintendo Power flash RAM cartridge series. This version features colored graphics, battery-backed memory for helping players save their progress in order to pick any stage of their choice after they completed them. Super Game Boy compatible features such as frames were added as well. Balloon Fight GB was later added to the Virtual Console for the Nintendo 3DS in Japan on October 19, 2011, while Balloon Kid was added to the same platform in North America on November 3, and in Europe on January 26, 2012. Balloon Kid was also re-released on the Nintendo Classics service on February 4, 2026.

Some of the game's BGM was added in some parts of the Game Boy Camera, such as the "Hot Spot" section.

== Development ==
Balloon Kid was designed by Yoshio Sakamoto and developed by Nintendo in co-operation with the external company Pax Softnica. It was first published in North America in February, and finally in Europe on September 28. As such, it is one of the few first-party Nintendo games that were not published in Japan, until Nintendo licensed it to Sanrio's subsidiary Character Soft for reprogramming and publishing it to the Family Computer as Hello Kitty World in Japan on March 27, 1992, while Balloon Kid was remade for Game Boy Color and released in Japan on July 31, 2000. According to Hitoshi Yamagami, director of Balloon Fight GB, the Game Boy Color version was developed due to demand for a Balloon Fight sequel and that the success of Game Boy Gallery made them consider making an updated version of Balloon Kid for the Japanese market. Both Balloon Kid and Balloon Fight GB were later re-released in their original regions as part of the Nintendo 3DS Virtual Console lineup, but "VS Mode" became incompatible.

== Reception ==
Reception

Aggregate score
Aggregator	Score
GameRankings	66.67%

IGN editor Lucas M. Thomas called the game "a solid little adventure game" that stood out to him because of its improvements over the gameplay of the original Balloon Trip mode of Balloon Fight. Although he found it to be "not mind-blowing, but it is fun and adds a bit of tension to things", he thought that Balloon Kid is "a nice little lost sequel from yesteryear that is pleasant to play through again for just three bucks". Mean Machines rated the game 51%, describing it as "full of promise", then adding that the repetitive gameplay and low difficulty caused the game to become boring. They added that while the premise was interesting, they couldn't "help thinking that this is a mediocre game". Author Jeff Rovin in the book How to Win at Game Boy Games noted the gameplay as "novel" if repetitive after the second stage of the game, adding that regardless the game was entertaining for all ages, and "a worthy addition to the Game Boy library", grading the game B.
