= Hello Kitty Party Land =

2026 video game

- North American and PAL region cover art
- Developers: Sanrio Games; G-Style
- Publishers: Sanrio Games (Japan); Bandai Namco Entertainment
- Platforms: Nintendo Switch; Nintendo Switch 2
- Release: October 29, 2026
- Genre: Party
- Modes: Single-player, multiplayer

Hello Kitty Party Land (Note: Japanese: サンリオ パーティランド, Hepburn: Sanrio Pāti Rando) is a 2026 party video game developed by Sanrio Games and G-STYLE. Based on the Hello Kitty brand, it was released for Nintendo Switch and Nintendo Switch 2 on October 29, 2026.

== Gameplay ==
Hello Kitty Party Land is a party video game in which players control customizable avatars and explore Party Town, where they can interact with Sanrio characters such as Hello Kitty, Gudetama, and Cinnamoroll, with certain characters able to accompany the player as a "partner". The primary game mode is a virtual board game featuring 45 minigames in which up to four players can participate. Unlike most party video games, which focus on competitive play, Hello Kitty Party Land is focused on cooperative play, as players work together to complete objectives. Other activities in Party Town include taking photos, collecting virtual stickers, farming, fishing, drawing, and creating music.

In total, the game features 145 Sanrio characters, with some less well-known characters making their first appearances in 3D.

== Development and release ==
Hello Kitty Party Land was first announced on April 21, 2026 as the first video game to be published under Sanrio Games, Sanrio's in-house video game label. Sanrio Games collaborated with Sapporo-based studio G-STYLE on development of the video game, which initially started in 2024 for the Nintendo Switch only. Sanrio's Managing Executive Officer Kosuke Hamasaki stated that the game was made with Sanrio's corporate philosophy of "Getting along together" and the idea of being accessible to new players of all ages; for example, minigames must be completed together rather than won by just one person.

The game was released for the Nintendo Switch and Nintendo Switch 2 on October 29, 2026, with Bandai Namco Entertainment publishing the game in regions outside of Japan. At launch, the game was available in nine languages, including English, Spanish, French, and Korean.

== Reception ==
Reception

Aggregate score
Aggregator	Score
Metacritic	(NS2) 66/100

According to the review aggregation website Metacritic, Hello Kitty Party Land received "mixed or average" reviews from critics.
