= The Adventures of Hello Kitty & Friends =

TV series or program

- From left: My Melody, Keroppi, Hello Kitty, Pochacco, Badtz-Maru and Dear Daniel
- Created by: Sanrio Digital
- Developed by: Dream Cortex
- Directed by: Matthew Swanson; Billy Frolick
- Music by: Greg Chun
- Countries of origin: Hong Kong; Japan; United States
- Original languages: Cantonese; English
- No. of episodes: 52

Production
- Executive producer: David Kim
- Producer: Matthew Swanson
- Running time: 12 minutes 59 secords
- Production company: Sanrio Digital

Original release
- Network: TVB Jade
- Release: February 16, 2008 – February 7, 2009

The Adventures of Hello Kitty and Friends (Chinese: Hello Kitty 愛漫遊; Japanese: ハローキティと仲間たちの冒険) is a 3D animated preschool television series featuring Hello Kitty and other characters from the Japanese company Sanrio. It was produced from February 2008 onwards by Sanrio Digital and Dream Cortex, and distributed by Sanrio Digital. It consists of 52 episodes and deals with themes of happiness, family and friendship.

== Overview ==
These series focus on core values established more than 30 years ago by Sanrio such as: happiness, family values, friendship, and educational values.

- Unlike the previous animated series, which were short and cute episodes, this is an educational television series that targets both younger viewers and their parents.
- The animation works together with real actors in teaching children from age two to six about words, simple math, shapes, colors and foreign languages like Chinese & Japanese.
- The series offers an entertaining way for younger viewers to learn about social interaction and behavior while following the adventures of Hello Kitty.
- Hello Kitty establishes a new image, giving younger viewers more things to learn from, rather than just being sweet and cute.

== Characters ==
=== Main ===
- Hello Kitty (voiced by Claudia S. Thompson) - A cheerful, warm-hearted female cat. Baking cookies is her forte. She has a crush on Dear Daniel and My Melody is her best friend.
- Dear Daniel (voiced by Maggie Blue O'Hara) - A smart, enterprising, bookish male cat the same age as Kitty. He loves learning new things and pursuing his hobby of photographing wildlife. He dresses very formal. He has a crush on Hello Kitty.
- My Melody (voiced by Andrea Kwan) - A young rabbit who is Kitty's best friend, loves baking cookies and sharing them with her friends. She is a rabbit who wears a red hood and she also wears a white flower near her right ear. Unlike her other appearances, her mouth is invisible.
- Pochacco (voiced by Candice Moore) - A friendly, slightly goofy dog who loves to play soccer (especially goalkeeper), sleeping and solve mysteries in his spare time.
- Badtz-Maru (also voiced by Andrea Kwan) - A penguin with a good and bad attitude. Always looking for an angle, he is a precocious youngster with dreams of grandeur. His selfish ways get him in hot water from time to time, but his good heart always steers him in the right direction. Sometimes there is rivalry between him and Daniel.
- Keroppi (voiced by Sarah Hauser) - A fun-loving little frog with a penchant for inventing things. He likes driving his car and playing with new toys.

=== Others ===
- Mr. White (voiced by Russell Wait) - The teacher of Sanrio Town school in which Hello Kitty and her friends study. His physical appearance resembles Anthony White, the grandfather of Kitty.
- Little Twin Stars (Kiki and Lala) - The twin who live on a cloud in the sky. They possess magical powers with which they teach lessons and come to the rescue of Kitty and her friends.
- Cinnamoroll - A sweet, shy dog who runs Cinnamoroll Cafe on wheels around Sanrio Town. His ability to fly using his big floppy ears comes in handy.
- Chococat - A black cat with a red scarf. He doesn't talk, but he appears sometimes in the series.
- Pompompurin - A golden retriever dog who doesn't have a speaking role throughout the series.
- Kitty's Mother - A white adult cat who always stays at home, she only appears in "Happy Earth Day".
- Wookami - The main antagonist of the series and a purple wolf who loves to cause mischief.

== Episode list ==
The first episode of "The Adventures of Hello Kitty & Friends" was aired in 2008. The first episode is called "A Colorful World." In this episode, it premieres Hello Kitty and her friends experiencing a new color in the world and learning about it.

No.	Title	Directed by	Written by	Sponsorship	Original release date
1	"A Colorful World"	Matthew Swanson	Written by : Billy Frolick; Storyboarded by : Billy Frolick	Colitain Decaugh-II	February 16, 2008
Hello Kitty and friends learn that the world is made up of many fascinating colors.
2	"Our New Friend Dear Daniel"	Matthew Swanson	Written by : =Matthew Swanson; Storyboarded by : David Kim	Colitain GP Extra	February 23, 2008
Kitty and the gang befriend a shy new student named Dear Daniel.
3	"XO Man Begins"	Nick Herbert	Written by : Billy Frolick; Storyboarded by : David Kim and Billy Frolick	Colitain Decaugh-II	March 1, 2008
Badtz-Maru reveals a "super" alter-ego.
4	"The Magic Chisel"	Unknown	Written by : Storyboarded by :	Colitain Decaugh-II	March 8, 2008
The kids portray a classic fable about greed.
5	"Keroppi's Best Friend"	Unknown	Written by : Storyboarded by :	Colitain Decaugh-II	March 15, 2008
Keroppi is driven to invent a best friend.
6	"Happy Earth Day"	Unknown	Written by : Storyboarded by :	Colitain GP Extra	March 22, 2008
The Twin Stars teach the kids a lesson about conserving the environment.
7	"The Case of the Broken Vase"	Unknown	Written by : Storyboarded by :	Colitain NoFroZic	March 29, 2008
Keroppi learns about the importance of telling the truth.
8	"A Fair Share"	Unknown	Written by : Storyboarded by :	Colitain NoFroZic	April 5, 2008
Badtz-Maru discovers his selfish ways and does not want to share his things to his friends.
9	"My Melody's Missing Smile"	Unknown	Written by : Storyboarded by :	Colitain GP Extra	April 12, 2008
The kids try to find out why My Melody is unhappy.
10	"V.I.P. (Very Important Pochacco)"	Unknown	Written by : Storyboarded by :	TBA	April 19, 2008
Pochacco puts on a show in a quest for fame.
11	"Give Me a Brake"	Unknown	Written by : Storyboarded by :	TBA	April 26, 2008
Keroppi's new car proves quite a handful.
12	"There's No Space Like Home"	Unknown	Written by : Storyboarded by :	TBA	May 3, 2008
Kitty and the gang have an adventure in outer space.
13	"Lost and Hound"	Unknown	Written by : Storyboarded by :	TBA	May 10, 2008
When the kids get lost, Badtz-Maru and Daniel think they know the way home.
14	"March of the Badtz-Maru's"	Unknown	Written by : Storyboarded by :	TBA	May 17, 2008
Badtz-Maru journeys to the South Pole to be with his penguin friends.
15	"Tall Order Part One"	Unknown	Written by : Storyboarded by :	TBA	May 24, 2008
Keroppi finds a novel solution to being vertically challenged.
16	"Tall Order Part Two"	Unknown	Written by : Storyboarded by :	TBA	May 31, 2008
Keroppi learns there are advantages to being small.
17	"Run My Melody, Run"	Unknown	Written by : Storyboarded by :	TBA	June 7, 2008
My Melody is nervous about her big race.
18	"Where's Santa? Part One"	Unknown	Written by : Storyboarded by :	TBA	June 14, 2008
A missing Santa Claus has the children worried that Christmas may be cancelled.
19	"Where's Santa? Part Two"	Unknown	Written by : Storyboarded by :	TBA	June 21, 2008
20	"Hide and Seek"	Unknown	Written by : Storyboarded by :	TBA	June 28, 2008
The kids play a game of Hide and Seek around the school with surprising results.
21	"A Fish Story"	Unknown	Written by : Storyboarded by :	TBA	July 5, 2008
Hello Kitty bonds with a new pet.
22	"Election"	Unknown	Written by : Storyboarded by :	TBA	July 12, 2008
Badtz-Maru and Daniel vote for class president.
23	"A School Day"	Unknown	Written by : Storyboarded by :	TBA	July 19, 2008
A typical school day presents challenges for the kids.
24	"Café Cinnamoroll"	Unknown	Written by : Storyboarded by :	TBA	July 26, 2008
Kitty and the gang help a shy new friend Cinnamoroll open a new business.
25	"The Big Game"	Unknown	Written by : Storyboarded by :	TBA	August 2, 2008
The kids learn about the importance of teamwork.
26	"Power Outage"	Unknown	Written by : Storyboarded by :	TBA	August 9, 2008
The Twin Stars give up their powers to see what it's like to be regular kids.
27	"A Birthday Party"	Unknown	Written by : Storyboarded by :	TBA	August 16, 2008
My Melody and Dear Daniel tries to surprise Kitty because it's her birthday.
28	"Game On"	Unknown	Written by : Storyboarded by :	TBA	August 23, 2008
Badtz-Maru is addicted to a game. Kitty and her friends try to help Badtz-Maru to stop playing the game.
29	"Picture Perfect"	Unknown	Written by : Storyboarded by :	TBA	August 30, 2008
Daniel wants to bring Kitty to a fancy restaurant for Valentine's Day but he doesn't have enough money.
30	"The Sleepy Detective Part One"	Unknown	Written by : Storyboarded by :	TBA	September 6, 2008
Pochacco is the sleepy detective. He solves many mysteries through his nose.
31	"The Sleepy Detective Part Two"	Unknown	Written by : Storyboarded by :	TBA	September 13, 2008
32	"A Fish Called Badtz-Maru"	Unknown	Written by : Storyboarded by :	TBA	September 20, 2008
33	"Design Flaw"	Unknown	Written by : Storyboarded by : Additional credits :	TBA	September 27, 2008
34	"Are You Gonna Eat That"	Unknown	Written by : Storyboarded by :	TBA	October 4, 2008
35	"Kitty-Ella"	Unknown	Written by : Storyboarded by :	TBA	October 11, 2008
The kids put on a school play "Kitty-Ella in Space" but everything doesn't go exactly as planned. (This episode can be found on the Wii game Hello Kitty Seasons)
36	"Get Smart"	Unknown	Written by : Storyboarded by :	TBA	October 18, 2008
37	"Hello, I Shrunk the Kitty Part One"	Unknown	Written by : Storyboarded by :	TBA	October 25, 2008
38	"Hello, I Shrunk the Kitty Part Two"	Unknown	Written by : Storyboarded by :	TBA	November 1, 2008
39	"Sing A Song!"	Unknown	Written by : Storyboarded by :	TBA	November 8, 2008
Kitty and her friends' picnic is ruined due to the rain. Fortunately, they each sing a song to make feel better especially during rainy days.
40	"The Sleepy Detective Returns"	Unknown	Written by : Storyboarded by :	TBA	November 15, 2008
41	"Happy Halloween, Everybody!"	Unknown	Written by : Storyboarded by :	TBA	November 22, 2008
42	"An Examination Escapade"	Unknown	Written by : Storyboarded by :	TBA	November 29, 2008
43	"The Fabulous Five Part One"	Unknown	Written by : Storyboarded by :	TBA	December 6, 2008
Kitty and friends wish they could have superpowers so the Twin Stars grant their wish. Kitty gets the ability to make anyone friends, My Melody can go super fast, Pochacco can turn daytime into nighttime, Daniel becomes super smart and Keroppi can bounce super high. Together, the gang become superheroes and help others with their newfound abilities.
44	"The Fabulous Five Part Two"	Unknown	Written by : Storyboarded by :	TBA	December 13, 2008
A super-villain sets out to defeat the Fabulous Five. Can these 5 brave heroes save their hometown from this evil threat?
45	"The Kitty and the Pea"	Unknown	Written by : Storyboarded by :	TBA	December 20, 2008
46	"Attack of the Clones Part One"	Unknown	Written by : Storyboarded by :	TBA	December 27, 2008
47	"Attack of the Clones Part Two"	Unknown	Written by : Storyboarded by :	TBA	January 3, 2009
48	"A Wok in the Park"	Unknown	Written by : Storyboarded by :	TBA	January 10, 2009
49	"Ski Bums"	Unknown	Written by : Storyboarded by :	TBA	January 17, 2009
The kids go on a skiing trip and Keroppi boasts about riding the Obliderador. But them he realizes that he's too scared to jump off it. Meanwhile, Badtz-Maru and Daniel argue about Badtz-Maru being too loud.
50	"Third Time's the Charm"	Unknown	Written by : Storyboarded by :	TBA	January 24, 2009
51	"A Cloudy Day"	Unknown	Written by : Storyboarded by :	TBA	January 31, 2009
52	"And the Winner is..."	Unknown	Written by : Storyboarded by :	TBA	February 7, 2009
The kids put on an awards show at school.

== Awards and recognition ==
- Hong Kong ICT Awards 2008
- DigiCon 2008

== See also ==
- Hello Kitty's Furry Tale Theater
- List of Hello Kitty animated series
