= Maggie Blue O'Hara =

Canadian actress

- Born: March 16, 1975 (age 51); Victoria, British Columbia, Canada
- Other name: Maggie O'Hara
- Occupation: Actress
- Years active: 1980–present

Maggie Blue O'Hara (born March 16, 1975) is a Canadian actress noted for her voice acting. She is well known as the voices of Madison Taylor in Cardcaptors and Shadowcat in X-Men: Evolution.

== Career ==
O'Hara appeared in many television series and television films, including The X-Files, Da Vinci's Inquest, Hope Island, Neon Rider and three years as a regular on the CBC TV series Northwood.

In 2005, O'Hara and her husband, Hong Kong sand-painting artist and animator Hoi Chiu, formed All Theatre Art Association, which created shows and toured them internationally to places such as England, Canada, Taiwan, China, Singapore, Thailand, Australia, and New Zealand. While living in Hong Kong, O'Hara provided voices for name-brand electronic toys such as VTech and animated series such as The Adventures of Hello Kitty & Friends.

In early 2015, after nearly 10 years in Hong Kong, O'Hara returned to British Columbia.

== Filmography ==
=== Animation roles ===
- Barbie and the Rockers: Out of This World – Additional voices
- Brain Powerd – Hime Utsumiya
- Cardcaptors – Madison Taylor
- Dragon Ball: Curse of the Blood Rubies – Bulma (Funimation & BLT Productions dub)
- Dragon Ball Z – Bulma (Ep. 123–260 (Ocean Studios dub)
- Dragon Tales – Shelley (Zak Takes a Dive in 2000) and Windy (Sneezy Does It in 2001 and Express Yourself in 2005)
- Earth Maiden Arjuna – Juna Ariyoshi
- Finley the Fire Engine – D.J.
- Grandma Got Run Over by a Reindeer – Daphne Spankenheimer
- Gundam Wing: Endless Waltz – Mariemaia Khushrenada
- Infinite Ryvius – Cullen Lucciora
- Inuyasha – Karan
- Jin-Roh: The Wolf Brigade (movie) – Nanami Agawa
- Mary-Kate and Ashley in Action! – Romy Bates
- MegaMan NT Warrior – Mika
- Meltylancer – Jun Kamishiro
- Monster Rancher – Holly
- My Little Pony: Friendship Is Magic – Strawberry Sunrise
- My Little Pony Tales – Sweetheart, Moki, Halfnot
- Ninjago: Masters of Spinjitzu – Ultra Violet (Seasons 8–9)
- Ranma ½ – Anna (Ep. 108)
- Ronin Warriors – Mia Koji (Násuti Yagyu) OAVs only
- Saber Marionette J and Saber Marionette R (OAV) – Lime
- The SoulTaker – Sayaka Tachibana
- The Adventures of Hello Kitty & Friends – Dear Daniel
- ToddWorld – Stella (Season 1)
- Video Girl Ai (OVA) – Ai Amano
- X-Men: Evolution – Kitty Pryde / Shadowcat

=== Live-action roles ===
- Cold Squad – Helen Larson
- My Son Johnny – Wendy
- Neon Rider – Jill
- Northwood – Nicole
- Other Women's Children – Wanda
- The X-Files – Young Woman
- Wiseguy – Mary Jane
- Beyond Belief: Fact or Fiction

=== Video games ===
- Once Upon a Forest – Abigail
