= Kero Kero Keroppi no Daibouken =

Video game series

Kero Kero Keroppi no Daibouken is a series of video games for the Nintendo Family Computer that lasted from 1991 to 1993.

== Series ==
=== Kero Kero Keroppi no Daibouken ===
Kero Kero Keroppi no Daibouken
- Publisher: Character Soft
- Platform: Family Computer
- Release: JP: March 29, 1991
- Genre: Puzzle
- Modes: Single-player, multiplayer

Kero Kero Keroppi no Daibouken (けろけろけろっぴ の大冒険, Keroppi's Big Adventure) is based on the popular Sanrio character Keroppi. Released on the Nintendo Family Computer console in Japan in 1991.

Big Adventure is a children's puzzle game where Keroppi must rescue his girlfriend Keroleen who is locked up in a castle. To do so, he must solve the action based puzzles in seven differently themed worlds with four different types of stages (the surface of the maze, flying a plane, a Reversi-like level, and through a field of lava). All the items in the game are pre-determined; there is a need to memorize the pattern for each playthrough so that a player may advance through the levels more quickly once they have achieved a degree of expertise in the game.

=== Kero Kero Keroppi no Daibouken 2: Donuts Ike ha Oosawagi ===
Kero Kero Keroppi no Daibouken 2: Donuts Ike ha Oosawagi
- Publisher: Character Soft
- Directors: Main director: Kouichi Ikeda; Sub-directors: Hiroaki Azumi and Mitsuharu Takatori
- Producer: Hozumi Yoshida
- Designer: Junzo Shimada
- Programmers: Shinji Ietomi; Junya Shimoda
- Platform: Family Computer
- Release: JP: February 19, 1993
- Genre: Action
- Mode: Single-player

Kero Kero Keroppi no Daibouken 2: Donuts Ike ha Oosawagi (けろけろけろっぴの大冒険2 （ドーナツ池はおおさわぎ！！）) is a Japan-exclusive action video game video game for children that was released on the Family Computer console in 1993.

This video game has Sanrio's character searching for lost children who have been kidnapped by monsters. Essentially a standard Wagyan Land clone, the player controlling the cartoon frog has to leap around platforms jumping on baddies or killing them with his croak weapon. Each bonus level involves matching characters from the Sanrio franchise in a format similar to the card game Concentration. Intermission screens show the progress of the character throughout the game.

Levels range from the forest to a seaside setting.

=== Kero Kero Keroppi no Bouken Nikki ===
Kero Kero Keroppi no Bouken Nikki: Nemureru Mori no Keroriinu (けろけろけろっぴの冒険日記:眠れる森のけろりーぬ, Keroppi's Adventure Diary: Sleeping Forest of Keroleen) is a Japan-exclusive role-playing game released for Super Famicom in 1994. The subtitle Nemureru Mori (眠れる森, Sleeping Forest) is a reference to Sleeping Beauty, and the plot revolves around rescuing Keroleen after she is kidnapped in the woods during a picnic.
