= Hello Kitty Online =

2008 video game

- Developers: Sanrio Digital; Typhoon Games
- Publishers: NA: Sanrio Digital; EU: Sanrio Digital
- Engine: Proprietary, mostly written in Delphi for the main game and Flash for the mini-games
- Platform: Windows
- Release: 2008
- Genre: Fantasy MMORPG
- Mode: Multiplayer

Hello Kitty Online was a free-to-play massively multiplayer online role playing game active from 2008 to 2017, developed by Sanrio Digital and Typhoon Games. The game is tied to the SanrioTown website, where players are required to register a free account.

== Premise ==
The game tells the story of a hero (the player) helping Hello Kitty and her friends wake up from eternal slumber and defeat a "mysterious and malevolent power".

== History ==
SanrioDigital hosted three phases of testing: Closed Beta, Founders' Beta, and Public stress test.

The closed beta application was announced on February 13, 2008 running through February 21, 2008. More than 50,000 applications were submitted. Due to the limited number of testing accounts available, applicants were instructed to create a video explaining why the applicant should be chosen to participate in the closed beta test. This submission process ran until March 10, 2008 with selected applications being announced on March 18, 2008. The Closed Beta phase began on April 23, 2008, and ran through June 1, 2008. During this Closed Beta period, Sanrio Digital joined with the game community MMOSite to give away more accounts to beta testers.

On September 12, 2008, news was posted on the Official Blog announcing a Beta stage called "Founders' Beta" scheduled to run from October 8, 2008, to November 8, 2008. Players who are selected for the Founder's Beta will be given special rewards, and will be able to keep characters and possessions at the end of the Founder's Beta. The announcement stated that there would be improvements to the client and game systems. A press release was also posted on the Sanrio Digital blog. Applications to participate in the Founders' Beta were accepted through email, through which 20,000 accounts were issued.

A public stress test was announced on February 2, 2009, and ran from February 14 though February 17. All SanrioTown members, except those located in Europe, were invited to participate in the public stress test. The public stress test was extended until February 22, during which a new charity event was announced, allowing players to craft in-game items. Similar to the previous Food for Friends event, the actual in-game items were used as a conversion rate to real-world goods which were donated to the Po Leung Kuk residential child care unit.

=== Food for Friends ===
From November 3 to 6, 2008, Sanrio ran Food for Friends, a charity event where guilds crafted in-game food for donation UNICEF and the Asian Youth Orchestra. Based on the distribution of crafted food (quantity, difficulty, etc.), Sanrio Digital made a cash donation to those charities. During the event, guilds produced a total of 344,965 items which were donated to the Game Masters. This was in turn calculated at a value of $12,273, to be donated to UNICEF and the Asian Youth Orchestra.

== International releases ==
=== Indonesia ===
Sanrio Digital partnered with GOGAME to publish HKO in Indonesia. An Indonesian version of Founders' Beta started on April 15, 2009, running through April 29, 2009. The Indonesian Open Beta phase ran from June 16, 2009 through June 24, 2009.

The commercial release of the Indonesian version was launched on July 1, 2009. The game ceased operation in December 2010.

=== Singapore and Malaysia ===
gloot.net is the publisher for HKO in Singapore and Malaysia, with a Founders Beta running from June 22 - July 22, 2009. The commercial release began on October 15, 2009.

=== Philippines ===
The game is officially published in the Philippines by Level Up! Games, launching an Open Beta on September 25, 2009, and a commercial launch occurring on November 11, 2009. On July 8, 2010, the Philippines version of HKO ceased operation, only to be reopened five months later on December 8 of the same year.

=== Europe ===
Hello Kitty Online was originally published by Burda:ic in Europe, with the game commercially launching on September 25, 2009. On March 26, 2010, Burdia:ic and SanrioDigital formally announced that SanrioDigital will begin self-publishing the European version of HKO. On April 7, 2010, Burda: ceased to publish HKO Europe.

=== Thailand ===
SanrioDigital announced C2 Vision as the publisher of HKO in Thailand on October 14, 2009. The Thai version of HKO went into closed beta on May 28, 2010, with a commercial launch on July 5, 2010. HKO Thailand permanently closed on December 24, 2011.

=== North America ===
Aeria Games was chosen as the publisher for the North American release, with a transition back to Sanrio Digital occurring on June 1, 2010.

== Global in-game events ==
On January 16, 2010, Sanrio Digital announced Food For Friends 2, the charity-driven in-game event to raise donations for charitable causes. The mechanics were similar to the previous Food For Friends, with players from North America, Singapore, Malaysia and Europe invited to participate. During the 10-day event, players from the various regions donated in-game items which were converted to US$18,038.30, the donations being delivered to Doctors Without Borders in response to the earthquake in Haiti.

A new event, Chocolate Harbor Rescue, was released on September 9, 2010. During the event, players accumulate points which were used to calculate a charitable contribution as follows:

- 50% of the funds were provided to the Oceana group in support of recovery from the Deepwater Horizon oil spill
- 50% were donated to UNICEF to provide support in recovery of the 2010 Pakistan floods.

== Gameplay ==
A screenshot taken during the beta release of Hello Kitty Online, featuring the human avatar in the game's rendition of London

Combat is secondary in HKO with focus on resource collecting and crafting. Several different locales based on, and named after, cities such as Beijing, Paris, London, Tokyo, and New York City are present, as well as original and accessible areas.

All players are represented by customizable human avatars. Available options during character creation include gender, hairstyle, eyes, skin tone, face and blood type.

Combat, though not the primary focus of the game, is still relevant. Weapons take the form of various blunt implements such as brooms, flyswatters and microphone stands. Players enter combat by right-clicking on a nearby monster, at which point the avatar and the monster will begin to exchange blows. Monsters don't die in HKO, but when their health bar is fully depleted they become dizzy, pass out and are defeated, allowing players to loot them.

=== Resource collection skills ===
In the majority of MMORPGs players receive experience points and level increments by defeating opponents and completing quests; this is not the case in HKO, where players level-up primarily through resource collection and item crafting.

Collecting resources is an important aspect of HKO because many items found in the game are obtained by crafting or purchasing from NPC vendors. Crafted items are generally superior to items bought from NPC vendors. Players must have the appropriate ingredients and/or resources in their inventory if they wish to craft.

Resource collection has four subtypes of skill: woodcutting, gathering, planting and mining. Players must choose a primary and a secondary skill from these four subtypes. A character's chosen skills can reach much higher levels than skills not chosen. Since higher-level resources require a higher corresponding level, players are encouraged to trade amongst each other for resources. In order to gather resources players must equip a resource gathering tool such as a pick-axe and click on an available resource node. Resource tools have level requirements in respective skills (e.g., an advanced pick-axe would require a higher level in the mining skill).

=== Item crafting ===
Item crafting is a key feature of Hello Kitty Online and, like resource collection, is divided into four skill subtypes: Cooking (food items that replenish health, energy or both); Tools/Weapons, Clothes (like weapons, clothes need to be created by the players themselves but can be traded to other players) and Furniture.

=== Farming ===
Each player receives a starter farm upon entering the game for the first time. The farm serves as the primary form of income in the game. Crops grown on the farm can be sold, traded to other players, or crafted into different items. Players can also purchase bigger and nicer (and pricier) farms. Successful farming requires players to take into consideration variables such as land fertility, pests and growth factors. If you don't water your farm frequently, the plants will dry out and die. But be aware that there are moles that sometimes come to farms to eat your plants.

=== Pet system ===
Every defeated monster in HKO has a chance of dropping a rare pet card that can be used to gain that monster's service, effectively making that monster a player's pet. Players may own a maximum of 3 pets in total, and only one pet can be used at any time. Pets have a variety of roles: they can act as mules, providing extra inventory space; some pets provide a buff to player stats while they are in service; lastly, they are able to help when it comes to collecting resources. Pets gain levels from food: when pets are fed regularly, their stats and level will increase over time.

=== Housing system ===
Each player's farm has an allotted space on which the farm's owner can build a house. In order to build a house, players require a land certificate, which can be bought from an NPC or received as a quest reward. Construction can begin after sufficient amounts of the required resources have been accumulated. There is a variety of different houses; the more elaborate and extravagant, the more expensive.

Once a house is completed, players can furnish the interiors with different appliances, furniture and interior elements such as wallpapers and floorboards.

=== Socializing ===
The design of Hello Kitty Online emphasizes the use of the game and SanrioTown web site as a social community platform. A number of social features found on SanrioTown were integrated directly into the game client, and HKO players are able to access SanrioTown's video sharing service, blogs and emails with a hellokitty.com address. Players can also participate in the discussions posted on the community forums. The official HKO website includes a wiki, which players can edit to include updated information about the game.

Players can also band together to form a guild. Guildmates can help each other build to speed up the construction of houses. Group Quests were planned to be available in future updates to the game.

Hello Kitty Online contains no direct player-versus-player conflict, though players may choose to compete amongst themselves in a number of available minigames.

=== Item Mall ===
The Item Mall was located both on the SanrioTown website and the game. At the Item Mall players would purchase premium items including unique clothes, pets, weapons and house designs. Purchases would require Sanrio Loyalty Points (which are gained from using SanrioTown services such as blogs), and Sanrio Cash Points (which are purchased using real money). Another method was paying money in exchange for points using game cards.

== Reception ==
Hello Kitty Online's Closed Beta garnered mixed, though mostly positive, reactions from the media and players. Noctalis.com called it "a cloyingly sweet pink-filled wonderland of talking animals set to a chirpy soundtrack". The game's sprite-based and isometric perspective 2.5D graphics were criticized as 10-year-old technology, and the lack of customization options for each character (e.g. dye kits or ways to change the color of the home items) was noted.

IGN's hands-on review of the Closed Beta was largely favorable, concluding:

After going through most everything the beta had to offer, including making stylish blue jeans, purchasing a Japanese garden, and getting a freaking T-rex as a pet, I can say that Hello Kitty Online is shaping up to be a pretty fun MMO for the younger, less battle hungry crowd. It's certainly not as in-depth as a major MMO is, but it provides a stylish environment with colorful characters and music that seems oddly epic for a game about cats and bunnies. While it seems like it'd be an ideal game for the younger demographic, I found plenty of adults playing it, too. HKO has the franchise appeal behind it to possibly make a hugely successful casual MMO.

With the SanrioTown blog feature, gamers were able to share their experiences while playing the game. The players were also responsible for helping out the newbies with their blog and video tutorials. Generally, players found other players and the HKO staff to be pleasant and helpful, citing the HKO environment as a breather from the "griefing" and PvP-confrontations that affect most online games.

House building was found to be difficult and players complained that they had to ask their guild mates to help. Hello Kitty Online's Closed Beta was praised for being largely free of bugs; the help and support provided by the developers was praised by players as swift and earnest, and it was considered a remarkable achievement by one reviewer.

A post on the Outblaze Blog dated February 15, 2008, summarized several online reactions to the closed beta announcement, and included humorous comments from influential game blog Kotaku, ValleyWag, InventorSpot, Japanator, and others.

While the game was generally positively received, many players became frustrated with the lack of attention to the game by its developers and a large portion quit the game. An increasing number of the remaining players, however, are attempting to encourage new players to join the game and old ones to return as well as attempting to contact the developers.

=== HKO Insider ===
On April 1, 2008, the World of Warcraft news and strategy web site WoW Insider announced that it would no longer cover World of Warcraft, but would switch to Hello Kitty Online. The banner that originally read "WoW Insider" was replaced with one that read "HKO Insider", with images of Hello Kitty on both ends. WoW Insider's April 1 content consisted exclusively of satirical articles (at least 26 of them) based on Hello Kitty Online. In the 28th article to be posted to the web site, an announcement was made that the site would revert to WoW Insider.

=== Island Adventure Pack ===
On April 1, 2008, Sanrio Digital issued an April Fools' Day announcement revealing the first Hello Kitty Online expansion pack, entitled "Island Adventure", was scheduled for release in 2009. The news was posted on the main SanrioTown blog as well as the official HKO blog. The title of the fictional expansion pack is a reference to the South Park episode "Make Love, Not Warcraft", in which the character Butters Stotch states that he prefers "Hello Kitty Island Adventure" to more violent and competitive games such as World of Warcraft.

According to Sanrio Digital's April Fools' release:

Island Adventure will be the first expansion pack in gaming history that will reduce rather than expand an existing game world. The plot revealed by the announcement sounds strikingly similar to the hit television series "Lost", involving survivors of a plane crash that had been traveling to Australia, their struggle to survive in a hostile environment while dealing with the island's natives, and the danger that the survivors will split up and follow two leaders rather than remain together.

The fake news was used as material for a humorous article on WoW Insider.

=== Awards ===
Hello Kitty Online was awarded a Best Digital Entertainment Award for the 2008 Hong Kong ICT Awards.

== 2015 hack ==
In 2015, the HKO database from the SanrioTown website was leaked online, exposing the private information from 3.3 million accounts, including first and last names, birthdays, gender, country of origin, passwords, and email addresses. This indirectly lead to the removal of any functionality of the Item Mall.

== Decline in popularity and closure ==
There were many factors that went into the game's decline in popularity. A few parts of the game were undeveloped in the game's earlier stages, which caused some people to stop playing after finishing the story. A physical release of the game was announced, but delayed, so it didn't sell as well as it could have. In 2010, Sanrio announced a Tokyo city quest, but it was never released. Instead, players got a stripped down New York quest. The final quest was the 2012 Valentine's Day quest.

According to MMO Fallout, Sanrio stopped supporting the game in March 2012. Presumably, this is when download links to the game were removed from the website. The game stopped receiving any updates, and was essentially abandoned. Sometime after, the original site, hellokittyonline.com, redirected to the SanrioTown website, which blocked users from making new accounts (although some found ways around it). Because traces of the game began to disappear, many people stopped playing, but the forums were still active with old and new players, who would log on occasionally, although the game was clearly not well taken care of, since Sanrio Digital was shifting their focus to mobile games instead. The servers remained active with minimal amounts of players until around 2017, when the game was taken offline permanently, unbeknownst to many people outside of the loyal fandom. The exact shutdown date is unknown, but a fan blog claims the last time they were able to log in was in August 2017.

On September 21, 2023, at around 18:00 Tokyo local time they had announced via email that, "...After careful consideration and evaluation of our business operations, we regret to inform you that we have decided to cease the operations of SanrioTown. As a result, the SanrioTown website, Your Account and the relevant services that we have been providing to you will no longer be available from November 1, 2023" officially marking the end of both Hello Kitty Online and SanrioTown for good.
