= Hello Kitty no Ohanabatake =

1992 video game

- Cover art
- Developer: Shimada Kikaku
- Publisher: Character Soft
- Series: Hello Kitty
- Platform: Family Computer
- Release: JP: December 11, 1992
- Genre: Platform
- Mode: Single-player

Hello Kitty no Ohanabatake (ハローキティのおはなばたけ; "Hello Kitty's Flower Shop") is a children's platform game developed by Shimada Kikaku. It was published by Character Soft, a video game publishing subsidiary of Sanrio, for the Nintendo Family Computer. It was released on December 11, 1992 exclusively in Japan.

== Gameplay ==
Exploring one of the advanced stages of the game.

Players control Hello Kitty must water all flowers in each stage. Hello Kitty must avoid animals and insects who block her way, though she can defend herself with the use of a large mallet. Money may be collected for the cash register, which adds to the player's score.

Running into enemies and allowing the time limit to expire will cause the player to lose a life. If the player loses all their lives it is game over and the score resets, though that is the only penalty as there are infinite continues.

There are 18 stages in total, with the second half of the game being more difficult than the first nine levels.
