= Keibun Ōta =

Painter and illustrator

Keibun Ōta おおた 慶文
- Born: Yoshifumi Ōta 太田 慶文; November 10, 1951 (age 74); Haboro, Hokkaidō Prefecture, Japan
- Known for: Illustration
- Awards: Best Work Award (1981, 1st Poetry and Fairy Tale Illustration Contest); 12th Sanrio Fine Arts Award (1986)

Keibun Ōta (おおた慶文, Ōta Keibun), real name Yoshifumi Ōta (太田慶文, Ōta Yoshifumi), is a painter and illustrator born on November 10, 1951, in Haboro, Hokkaidō Prefecture, Japan. He is best known for his watercolor paintings of young girls and children. Ōta has multiple books in print which collect his works, and he has created illustrations for magazines, books, calendars, and posters, and has had multiple one-man exhibitions.

He currently lives in Izu, Shizuoka Prefecture.

== Biography ==
Ōta was born in Haboro, Hokkaidō Prefecture, Japan on 10 November 1951. He graduated from Hokkaido Bifuka High School. After moving to Tokyo to work as a freelance interior designer, he taught himself to paint and began doing work as an illustrator. In 1981, he won the Best Work Award at the 1st Poetry and Fairy Tale Illustration Contest sponsored by Sanrio. He won the 12th Sanrio Fine Arts Award in 1986.

In 1992, Ōta held his first series of exhibitions at department stores in every major city in Japan. This has become a regular event since then. He held a nationwide exhibit tour at five locations throughout Japan in 1995. Due to over 600,000 people attending the exhibits, the exhibit had to be extended to accommodate the additional attendees.

Ōta established his home page in 2000 for the 20th anniversary of his professional debut. In 2001, he held an exhibit at the Yokohama Sogō Fine Arts Gallery, and in 2002, exhibits were held at the Sakai Takashimaya and Matsuyama Takashimaya department stores.

== Works ==
=== Book collections ===
- Hidamari (ひだまり), (1983, Sanrio)
- Komorebi (こもれび), (1983, Sanrio)
- Ano Ko (あのこ), (1985, Hakusensha)
- Okurege wa Kaze no Katachi (おくれ毛は風のかたち), (1986, Sanrio)
- Soshite (そして), (1987, Hakusensha)
- Hatsukoi (はつ恋), (1988, Sanrio) (1995 reissue, Sanrio)
- Kaze no Labyrinth (風のラビリンス), (1989, Hakusensha)
- Maebure no Kiza (まえぶれの刻), (1989, Sanrio) (1994 reissue, Sanrio)
- Midori no Silhouette (碧のシルエット), (1991, Hakusensha)
- Hikarete (惹かれて), (1991, Sanrio)
- Four Seasons (フォーシーズンズ), (1991, Pinpoint) (1998 reissue, Sanrio)
- Kitto (きっと), (1992, Hakusensha)
- Yubikiri (ゆびきり), (1992, Sanrio)
- Kazeiro no Kuchizuke (風色のくちづけ), (1993, Sanrio)
- Freelance (フリーランス), (1995, Movic)
- Yumegatari (夢語り), (1995, Sanrio)
- Hanazakari (花盛り), (1997, Sanrio)
- Yakusoku (やくそく), (1998, Hakusensha)
- Pianissimo (ピアニッシモ), (2004, Aiikusha)

=== CD-ROM collections ===
- The World of Keibun Ōta (おおた慶文の世界, Ōta Keibun no Sekai) (Macintosh/Windows hybrid, 1995-04-18, Lits Compute)

== Awards and recognition ==
- 1981 - Best Work Award at the 1st Poetry and Fairy Tale Illustration Contest sponsored by Sanrio
- 1986 - Winner of the 12th Sanrio Fine Arts Award

Ōta was featured as the cover artist on several issues of Moe, a monthly art and illustration magazine published in Japan by Hakusensha since 1984.

- October 1983, cover of Picture Books and Stories (絵本とおはなし, Ehon to Ohanashi), the predecessor magazine to Moe
- May 1984, also featured as the illustrator of a serialized fairy tale by Yōko Inoue and the monthly calendar included in the magazine
- October 1984
- July 1985
- January 1986
