= Hello Kitty: Roller Rescue =

2005 video game

- PAL region cover art
- Developer: XPEC Entertainment
- Publishers: JP: Hamster; NA: Namco Hometek; PAL: Empire Interactive
- Series: Hello Kitty
- Engine: RenderWare
- Platforms: Xbox, GameCube, PlayStation 2, Windows
- Release: PlayStation 2: JP: April 28, 2005; PAL: September 9, 2005; GameCube: NA: August 16, 2005; PAL: September 9, 2005; Xbox: PAL: September 9, 2005; TW: April 4, 2005; Windows: PAL: September 9, 2005
- Genre: Action-adventure
- Modes: Single-player, Multiplayer

Hello Kitty: Roller Rescue (ハローキティのピコピコ大作戦, Harō Kiti no Pikopiko Daisakusen; "Hello Kitty's Picopico Mission") (in Asia: Hello Kitty: Mission Rescue) is a 2005 action-adventure video game developed by XPEC Entertainment for the PlayStation 2, GameCube, Xbox, and Windows. The game features Hello Kitty and other Sanrio characters.

== Console bundle ==
A Hello Kitty Crystal Xbox was released with Sanrio in Singapore, to commemorate the release of the game on the Xbox. The special edition console was translucent with a pink and orange Hello Kitty picture covering the X on top of the case. A limited production run of 550 units was sold at a retail price of S$99 (US$61), if one purchased certain selected Samsung LCD TVs during a promotion. Included with the Hello Kitty Crystal console was a matching Crystal Controller S and a copy of Hello Kitty Mission Rescue. Another Limited Edition, including a DVD remote was sold in Taiwan, limited to 1000 units.

== Reception ==
Reception

Aggregate score
Aggregator	Score			
Aggregator	GameCube	PC	PS2	Xbox
Metacritic	64%	N/A	N/A	N/A

Review scores
Publication	Score			
Publication	GameCube	PC	PS2	Xbox
GameSpot	7.0/10	N/A	N/A	N/A
IGN	6.0/10%	N/A	N/A	N/A

The game received mixed reviews from critics. It holds a 64% rating on Metacritic. IGN rated the game 6 of 10, calling it just "Okay". Nintendo Official Magazine gave it a score of 68%, saying there was "nothing particularly outstanding about it".
