= Hello Kitty: Big City Dreams =

2008 video game

- Developer: Human Soft
- Publisher: Empire Interactive
- Platform: Nintendo DS
- Release: NA: November 11, 2008; EU: November 28, 2008; AU: September 11, 2010
- Genre: Puzzle game
- Modes: Single-player, multiplayer

Hello Kitty: Big City Dreams is a Hello Kitty game published by Empire Interactive for the Nintendo DS.

== Gameplay ==
Hello Kitty: Big City Dreams offers two complementary styles of play: exploration and mini-game. Exploration mode offers the chance to take control of Hello Kitty and explore a 3D city, complete with streets, buildings, shops, neighborhood characters, and public transportation that Hello Kitty can ride. Different locations within the city will trigger a variety of mini-games for Hello Kitty to play. Completing these mini-games will earn friendship points which Hello Kitty can then use to ride the bus or train, purchase new outfits and items, decorate and customize her apartment, and to ultimately achieve her goal of moving into a penthouse apartment. In order to keep her friends happy, Hello Kitty will have to stay in touch by checking her mail frequently.

== Development ==
The game went gold on October 20, 2008. In North America the game was distributed by Atari.

== Reception ==
Reception

Review score
Publication	Score
Jeuxvideo	11/20

North Bay Nugget recommends the game, stating "If you have a daughter seven or younger, it's a must-buy."
