= Typhoon Games =

Hong Kong video game developer

Typhoon Games Ltd.
- Industry: Video games
- Founder: August 2001
- Headquarters: Hong Kong

Typhoon Games Ltd. was founded in August 2001 in Hong Kong as a game developing and publishing company that caters mainly to the Asian market. It is the sister company of Typhoon Media International Ltd. and has strategic partnerships with Outblaze Ltd. and Dream Cortex.

Typhoon Games has published several PC games including Yu-Gi-Oh! Online and Gurumin: A Monstrous Adventure, and has developed games such as The Impossible Team Online Game and Hello Kitty: Roller Rescue for the PlayStation 2.
