= Hello Kitty's Cube Frenzy =

1998 video game

- Developers: Layup (PS1); Torus Games (GBC)
- Publishers: JP: Culture Publishers; NA: NewKidCo
- Platforms: Game Boy Color, PlayStation
- Release: PlayStation: JP: June 25, 1998; NA: March 30, 1999; Game Boy Color: NA: December 16, 1999
- Genre: Puzzle
- Mode: Single-player

Hello Kitty's Cube Frenzy (known as Hello Kitty's Cube de Cute in Japan) is a puzzle video game featuring Hello Kitty that was released for the PlayStation and Game Boy Color.

== Gameplay ==
Second level of the "Chinese Robe" stage

The game involves guiding Hello Kitty to every item on a given level, using different types of bricks to manipulate her surroundings, thus allowing her to get every item. Often, the player must build steps for Hello Kitty out of Tetris-style falling bricks. Also, some of Hello Kitty's friends appear on levels, causing the bricks to move in undesirable ways. The Game Boy Color version suffers from sluggish controls, upping the difficulty level.

== Reception ==
Craig Harris of IGN rated the PlayStation release 6.5 out of 10 and described it as "surprisingly fun" with an "interesting [game] design", while adding that the graphics were "very colorful, but very basic".

Reception

Review scores
Publication	Score
Computer and Video Games	3/5 (PS)
Nintendo Power	6.9/10 (GBC)
IGN	6.5/10 (PS); 5/10 (GBC)
