= Hello Kitty's Furry Tale Theater =

American animated series

- Genre: Children's animation Comedy; Adventure; Fantasy
- Developed by: Phil Harnage
- Directed by: Michael Maliani
- Voices of: Carl Banas; Tara Strong; Cree Summer; Sean Roberge; Mairon Bennett; Noam Zylberman; Len Carlson; Elizabeth Hanna; Greg Morton; Denise Pidgeon; Fred Savage
- Theme music composer: David Pomeranz
- Composers: Haim Saban; Shuki Levy
- Country of origin: United States
- No. of episodes: 13 (26 segments)

Production
- Executive producer: Andy Heyward
- Producer: Michael Maliani
- Animator: Toei Animation
- Running time: approx. 22–23 min.
- Production companies: DIC Animation City; MGM/UA Television Productions

Original release
- Network: CBS
- Release: September 19 – December 12, 1987

Hello Kitty's Furry Tale Theater is an American animated series based on the Japanese character Hello Kitty, co-produced by DIC Animation City and MGM/UA Television Productions and animated by Toei Animation. The series involves Hello Kitty and her friends (and occasionally family) doing their own version of popular fairy tales and stories. Each of the 13 episodes consisted of two 11-minute cartoons, for a total of 26 "shows"; each show was a spoof of a well-known fairy tale or movie. The series is notable for featuring Tara Strong in her first major role as a voice actress.

== Characters ==
- Hello Kitty (voiced by Tara Strong) (Note: credited as Tara Charendoff) – the cheerful and kind kitten director of the theater. In many tales she is the protagonist or a supportive fairy.
- Mama Kitty (voiced by Elizabeth Hanna) – Kitty's mom, who plays motherly roles in the tales.
- Papa Kitty (voiced by Len Carlson) – Kitty's dad, who plays fatherly roles in the tales.
- Grandma Kitty (voiced by Elizabeth Hanna) – Kitty's grandmother. She's cast as supporting roles in the tales.
- Grandpa Kitty (voiced by Carl Banas) – Kitty's grandfather. He casts as supporting roles in the tales.
- Tuxedo Sam (voiced by Sean Roberge) – a happy penguin stage helper of the theater. In many tales, he is the protagonist or Kitty's sidekick or love interest.
- My Melody (voiced by Mairon Bennett) – a very timid supporting bunny actress who is Kitty's best friend. Her roles are often smaller and she needs assistance to perform perfectly.
- Chip (voiced by Noam Zylberman) – a cheery supporting white seal pup actor. He has supporting roles with the protagonists.
- Catnip (voiced by Cree Summer) (Note: credited as Cree Summer Francks) – a green Siamese Cat, who is the diva-like frenemy of Hello Kitty, but is sociable, and does have a friendly side. She often takes the role of the antagonist in the tales (such as a mobster, Captain Hook, Count Dracula, Ebenezer Scrooge, Darth Vader etc.).
- Fangora (voiced by Denise Pidgeon) – a purple Siamese Cat and Catnip's mother. She sometimes fills in for the role of a secondary antagonist in the tales.
- Grinder (voiced by Greg Morton) – a dim-witted, naive and competent bulldog who often takes the role of a secondary antagonist, a bumbling accomplice to Catnip, or a supporting character sometimes.
- Mouser (voiced by Fred Savage) – a trickster mouse who scares and plays tricks on Hello Kitty and her friends in the last episode, and is the original owner of the theater who makes a deal at the end with Kitty to all be the owners. He is very skilled at playing the pipe organ.

== Format ==
Each episode opens with a theater filling up with patrons and usually a look at some comical goings-on backstage. The play then begins (with Hello Kitty or Tuxedo Sam saying "Once upon a meow") and the stage transforms into whatever setting the story calls for, like outer space, the American Old West, the Great Depression or the Middle Ages. Each show is a light-hearted takeoff of a children's story or a popular movie. Catnip, Grinder, and Fangora were usually typecast as the villains.

At the end of each episode, the stage returns to normal, and the actors take their bow. The only exception to this format was the final episode "The Phantom of the Theater", which takes place entirely on the theater's backstage with the cast out of their roles.

== Episodes ==
Ep.	Cartoon	Spoof of:	Written by	Release date
1	The Wizard of Paws	The Wizard of Oz	Phil Harnage	September 19, 1987
1	Pinocchio Penguin	Pinocchio	Jack Hanrahan & Eleanor Burian-Mohr	September 19, 1987
2	Cinderkitty	Cinderella	Phil Harnage	September 26, 1987
2	The Pawed Piper	The Pied Piper of Hamelin	Jim Lenahan & Martha Moran	September 26, 1987
3	K.T. the Kitty Terrestrial	E.T. the Extra-Terrestrial	Phil Harnage	October 3, 1987
3	Peter Penguin	Peter Pan	Tony Marino	October 3, 1987
4	Kittylocks and the Three Bears	Goldilocks and the Three Bears	Jack Hanrahan & Eleanor Burian-Mohr	October 10, 1987
4	Paws the Great White Dog Shark	Jaws	Phil Harnage	October 10, 1987
5	Cat Wars	Star Wars	Tony Marino	October 17, 1987
5	Tar-Sam of the Jungle	Tarzan, George of the Jungle	Pat Allee & Ben Hurst	October 17, 1987
6	Sleeping Kitty	Sleeping Beauty	Martha Moran	October 24, 1987
6	Kitty and the Kong	King Kong	Jack Hanrahan & Eleanor Burian-Mohr	October 24, 1987
7	Kitty and the Beast	Beauty and the Beast	Temple Mathews	October 31, 1987
7	Little Red Bunny Hood	Little Red Riding Hood	Phil Harnage	October 31, 1987
8	Snow White Kitty and the One Dwarf	Snow White	Phil Harnage	November 7, 1987
8	Frankencat	Frankenstein	Phil Harnage	November 7, 1987
9	Catula	Dracula	Matt Uitz	November 14, 1987
9	Paws of the Round Table	Knights of the Round Table, The Sword in the Stone	Tony Marino	November 14, 1987
10	Rumpeldogskin	Rumpelstiltskin	Jack Hanrahan; Eleanor Burian-Mohr	November 21, 1987
10	Robin Penguin	Robin Hood	Jack Olesker	November 21, 1987
11	Hello Mother Goose	Mother Goose	Jack Hanrahan & Eleanor Burian-Mohr	November 28, 1987
11	Crocodile Penguin	Crocodile Dundee	Phil Harnage & Martha Moran	November 28, 1987
12	The Ugly Quackling	The Ugly Duckling	Jack Hanrahan & Eleanor Burian-Mohr	December 5, 1987
12	Grinder Genie and the Magic Lamp	Aladdin, One Thousand and One Nights	Phil Harnage & Martha Moran	December 5, 1987
13	The Year Scroogenip Swiped Christmas	A Christmas Carol, How the Grinch Stole Christmas!, The Night Before Christmas	Phil Harnage	December 12, 1987
13	The Phantom of the Theater	The Phantom of the Opera	Phil Harnage	December 12, 1987

== Television broadcast ==
=== North American television debut ===
In the USA, Hello Kitty's Furry Tale Theater aired on September 19, 1987 on CBS.

=== International broadcast ===
Contrary to popular belief, the series does not verifiably have a Japanese dub, nor was it released in Japan in any other form. In the UK, it was broadcast on the music and entertainment channel MTV from September 27, 1987. It was also aired on ABS-CBN in the Philippines in 1990.

== Release ==
=== Region 1 ===
On March 24, 1998, MGM Home Entertainment released two VHS videocassettes each containing three cartoon shorts, as well as the opening and closing sequences.

- Hello Kitty: Kitty and the Beast (also includes "Grinder Genie and the Magic Lamp", "Hello Mother Goose" and "Little Red Bunny Hood")
- Hello Kitty: Wizard of Paws (also includes "Snow White Kitty", "Sleeping Kitty" and "Peter Penguin")

From 2003 to 2004, MGM Home Entertainment under their MGM Kids label released 5 DVD's each containing five cartoon shorts; the only one of the 26 not to be included was "The Year Scroogenip Swiped Christmas". The opening and closing sequences are not included.

- Hello Kitty Becomes a Princess (February 4, 2003: "Cinderkitty", "Kittylocks and the Three Bears", "Sleeping Kitty", "Kitty and the Beast", "Snow White Kitty and the One Dwarf")
- Hello Kitty Goes to the Movies (February 4, 2003: "K.T. The Kitty Terrestrial", "The Wizard of Paws", "Kitty and the Kong", "Cat Wars", "Paws: The Great White Dog Shark")
- Hello Kitty Saves the Day (February 4, 2003: "Peter Penguin", "Tar-Sam of the Jungle", "Paws of the Round Table", "Crocodile Penguin", "Grinder Genie and the Magic Lamp")
- Hello Kitty Plays Pretend (February 17, 2004: "The Phantom of the Theater", "Frankencat", "Catula", "The Pawed Piper", "Rumpeldogskin")
- Hello Kitty Tells Fairy Tales (February 17, 2004: "Robin Penguin", "Hello Mother Goose", "The Ugly Quackling", "Pinocchio Penguin", "Little Red Bunny Hood")

=== Region 2 ===
The same DVDs that were released in the United States were released in Region 2 by MGM Home Entertainment and 20th Century Fox Home Entertainment. Becomes a Princess, Goes to the Movies and Saves the Day were all released in September 2004, using the same prints as the US versions without the opening and closing sequences.

Plays Pretend and Tells Fairy Tales were not released in the United Kingdom until October 2012. These prints are not the same as the US versions, and do include the opening and closing sequences. Another DVD titled Hello Kitty Has Fun at Halloween was also released in the same year, featuring 3 episodes from Plays Pretend and an episode from Goes to the Movies. A boxset was also released, featuring all 5 of the original DVDs.
