= 聖子 =

聖子 may refer to:

- "God the Son" for Chinese
- Kiyoko, Japanese feminine given name
- Seong-ja, Korean given name
- Seiko (given name), Japanese feminine given name
- Shōko (name), Japanese feminine given name
