= 正子 =

正子 may refer to:

- Jeong-ja, Korean given name
- Masako, Japanese feminine given name
- Seiko (given name), Japanese feminine given name
- “Positron” (正子, also written as 正電子, 陽電子 and 反電子) for Chinese
