= Anzu =

Anzu may refer to:

- Anzû, a divine storm-bird in several Mesopotamian religions
- Anzu (dinosaur), a genus of theropod dinosaur containing the species Anzu wyliei

== As a given name ==
Anzu
- Gender: Female
- Language: Japanese

Anzu (杏子, 杏, あんず; lit. "apricot") is a Japanese given name for females. Kyoko is an alternate reading of the same kanji (杏子).

=== People ===
- Anzu Haruno (春野 杏; born 1994), Japanese voice actress
- Anzu Lawson (born 1980), American actress
- Anzu Nagai (永井 杏; born 1992), Japanese actress
- Anzu Yamamoto (山本 杏; born 1994), Japanese judoka

=== Fictional characters ===
- Anzu (あんず), a main protagonist of the Rhythm game Ensemble Stars!
- Anzu Hayashi (林 アンズ), a character in Hinamatsuri (manga)
- Anzu Kadotani (角谷 杏), a character in Girls und Panzer
- Anzu Mazaki (真崎 杏子) (Téa Gardner in all English anime dubs and in related video games), a protagonist in Yu-Gi-Oh!
- Anzu Yukimura (雪村 杏), a character in Da Capo II
- Anzu Yamasaki (山咲 杏), a character in Gantz
- Iyojima Anzu, a main character of Nogi Wakaba is a Hero
- Anzu Kinashi, a character from the Japanese horror adventure game, Your Turn to Die -Death Game by Majority-
- Anzu Futaba (双葉杏), a character in The Idolmaster Cinderella Girls
- Anzu, a main protagonist of the middle grade graphic novel Anzu and the Realm of Darkness by Mai K. Nguyen
- Anzu, a bird nature god (Loa) in the game World of Warcraft.
