= Kiyoko =

- Pronunciation: Japanese: [kijoꜜko] English approximation: kee-YOH-koh
- Gender: Female

Origin
- Origin: Japanese
- Region of origin: Japan

Other names
- Related names: Kiyomi; Kiyone; Kyoko

Kiyoko (きよこ, キヨコ) is a feminine Japanese given name.

== Written forms ==
Kiyoko can be written many ways using different kanji characters. Some versions of the name are:

- 清子, meaning "pure child"
- 憙よ子, meaning "rejoice-child"
- 喜与子, meaning "rejoice, gift child"
- 喜洋子, meaning "rejoice, ocean child"
- 潔子, meaning "undefiled child", "virtuous child".
- 聖子, meaning "sacred child".

== People ==
- Hayley Kiyoko (ヘイリー・キヨコ: born Hayley Kiyoko Alcroft), an American actress, singer-songwriter, musician, and dancer
- Kiyoko Arai (あらい きよこ), Japanese manga artist
- Fujiwara no Kiyoko (藤原 聖子; 1122–1182), Empress consort of Japan as the consort of Emperor Sutoku
- Kiyoko Fukuda (福田 貴代子; born 1944), Japanese former First Lady of Japan, wife of Yasuo Fukuda
- Kiyoko Fukuda (福田 記代子; born 1970), Japanese former volleyball player
- Kiyoko Ichiki (市来 貴代子; born 1970), Japanese professional wrestler
- Kiyoko Ishiguro (1901–2015), Japanese supercentenarian
- Kiyoko Matsumoto (松本 貴代子), who committed suicide by jumping into the crater of Mount Mihara in 1933, starting a trend in Japan
- Kiyoko Miki (三木 キヨ子; 1919–2018), Japanese politician
- Kiyoko Murata (村田 喜代子; born 1945), Japanese writer
- Kiyoko Nomura (1954–2016), Japanese former professional tennis player
- Kiyoko Ogawa (小川 清子; born 1946), Japanese sprinter
- Kiyoko Okabe (岡部 喜代子; born 1949), Japanese judge
- Kiyoko Ono (小野 清子; 1936–2021), Japanese politician and gymnast
- Kiyoko Sayama (佐山 聖子), Japanese animator and director
- Kiyoko Shibuya (渋谷 紀世子; born 1970), Japanese visual effects director and film producer
- Kiyoko Shimahara (嶋原 清子; born 1976), Japanese marathon runner
- Kiyoko Sugimura (born 1929), Japanese athlete
- Kiyoko Suizenji (水前寺 清子; born 1945), Japanese enka singer and actress
- Kiyoko Takeda (武田 清子; 1917–2018), Japanese scholar

== Fictional characters named Kiyoko ==
- Kiyoko (キヨコ, aka Number 25), a character in the Japanese Manga, Akira
- Kiyoko Yamaguchi, kayfabe wife of WWE manager Wally Yamaguchi
- Kiyoko (aka Komori /bat/), a character in the Japanese horror film Suicide Club
- Kiyoko Madoka, a character from the manga series Gilgamesh and its anime adaption
- Kiyoko, a character in the Japanese anime film Tokyo Godfathers
- Kiyoko Shimizu, a character in the Japanese anime Haikyuu!!

== Other ==
- The written form 聖子, meaning "sacred child," is famously read as "Seiko," which is commonly associated with Japanese singer Seiko Matsuda
