= Ayako Tanahashi =

Japanese educator

- 棚橋绚子
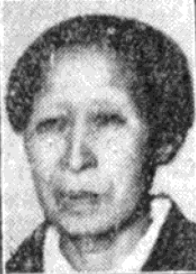
- Tanahashi, from a 1911 publication
- Born: March 25, 1839; Osaka, Japan
- Died: September 23, 1939 (aged 100); Tokyo, Japan
- Occupations: Educator, school administrator
- Known for: Founder and principal of Tokyo Girls' High School

Ayako Tanahashi (Japanese: 棚橋绚子; March 25, 1839 – September 23, 1939) was a Japanese educator and school administrator. She was a founder and first principal of Tokyo Girls' High School.

== Early life and education ==
Tanahashi was born in Osaka (some sources give Nagoya as her birthplace), the daughter of Shoyemon Ushioda. She studied Chinese classics, and married a blind scholar, Daisaku Tanahashi, when she was seventeen. They had three children. Her son, Ichiro Tanahashi, became an educator, scholar, and politician.

== Career ==
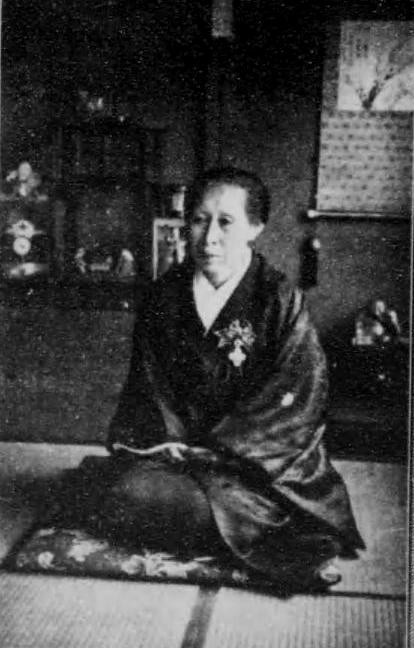
Tanahashi, from a 1914 publication.

Tanahashi became a teacher at Nagoya Girls' School in 1872, at Tokyo Normal School in 1875, and at Peeresses' School in 1878. She founded the Kinsei Elementary School, and was principal of a private school. She worked on education projects with the Nagoya Municipal Office from 1899 to 1901. In 1902, she and her son helped to establish the Tokyo Girls' High School at Mita, and she was the school's first principal.

She was active in the women's section of Nishimura Shigeki's Nihon Kodoka, or Japan Society for the Expansion of the Way. She was a founder of the Greater Japan Women's Educational Society, founded in 1887. She was a co-founder of the Aikoku Fujinkai, or Patriotic Women's Society, in 1901, with Atomi Kakei, Miwata Masako, Shimoda Utako, and Yamawaki Fusako. In 1913, she contributed an essay, "High School Girls Then and Now", to a special issue of Chūō Kōron on the New Woman in Japan.

She was decorated with the 6th Order of Merit in 1911. In November 1920, she met with the Empress at the Imperial Palace; the Empress commended her work in women's education.

== Death ==
Tanahashi's husband died in 1893, and she died in 1939, at the age of 100, in Tokyo. Adrienne Moore, a western interviewer, visited with Tanahashi in her last year, and reported that "Keep active, be vain, and don't worry" was Tanahashi's formula for long life.
