= The Pokémon Company =

Japanese company

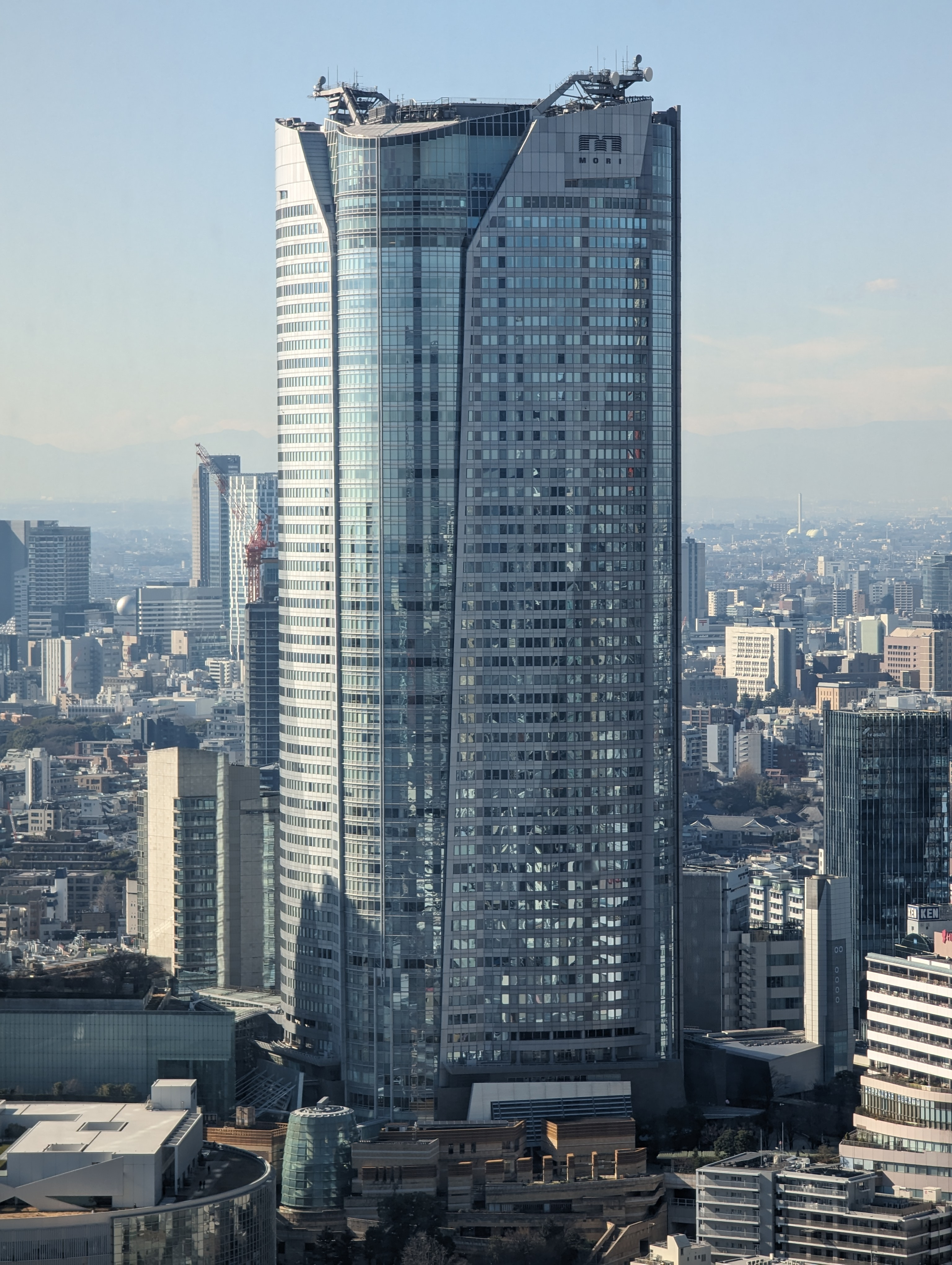
- The Roppongi Hills Mori Tower, the headquarters of The Pokémon Company in Minato, Tokyo
- Native name: 株式会社ポケモン
- Romanized name: Kabushiki gaisha Pokémon
- Formerly: Pokémon Center Co., Ltd. (1998–2000)
- Type: Joint venture
- Founded: 23 April 1998; 28 years ago Nihonbashi, Chuo, Tokyo, Japan
- Headquarters: Roppongi, Minato, Tokyo, Japan
- Key people: Tsunekazu Ishihara (president and CEO); Takato Utsunomiya (COO); Junichi Masuda (Chief Creative Fellow)
- Products: Pokémon franchise
- Revenue: ¥ 297.51 billion (2023)
- Net income: ▲¥ 62.7 billion (2023)
- Owners: Nintendo (32%); Creatures; Game Freak
- Number of employees: 448 (2022)
- Subsidiaries: The Pokémon Company International, Inc.; Pokémon Korea, Inc.; Pokémon Center Co., Ltd.; Pokémon Singapore Pte. Ltd.; Pokémon Shanghai; Millennium Print Group; Mouthaan Boekdruk en Offset B.V.; Pokemon Taiwan Co., Ltd.; PokéPark Kanto; The Pokémon Works (50%)
- Website: Japanese website English website

The Pokémon Company (株式会社ポケモン, Kabushiki Gaisha Pokemon; TPC), formerly known as Pokémon Center Co., Ltd. (ポケモンセンター株式会社, Pokemon Sentā Kabushiki gaisha), is a Japanese company responsible for brand management, production, publishing, marketing, and licensing of the Pokémon franchise, which consists of video games, a trading card game, anime television series, films, manga, home entertainment products, merchandise, and other ventures.

Pokémon Center Co., Ltd. was founded in April 1998 through a joint investment by video game series developer Game Freak, original series publisher Nintendo, and Trading Card Game developer and original series producer Creatures to operate the Pokémon Center stores in Japan. In October 2000, it expanded its operations to cover the entire Pokémon franchise, and rebranded to its current name. The company is headquartered in the Roppongi Hills Mori Tower in Roppongi, Minato, Tokyo.

The company owns separate subsidiaries that handle operations in different parts of the world, with The Pokémon Company International supporting territories outside Asia and being responsible for brand management, licensing, marketing, the Pokémon Trading Card Game, and the official Pokémon website on those territories, including in the Americas and Europe.

Since 2001, The Pokémon Company has handled the publishing of all Pokémon console games in Japan, while overseas Nintendo subsidiaries such as Nintendo of America and Nintendo of Europe handle distribution and co- publication working together with The Pokémon Company International in localization, production and QA, while development is often handled by different companies contracted in spin-offs and by Game Freak in mainline titles. The company is solely responsible for publishing and licensing mobile Pokémon titles separated from Nintendo's own mobile games, unlike console titles where it has help from Nintendo in overseas regional publishing.

== History ==
The logo of The Pokémon Company International

In 1998, Nintendo, Creatures, and Game Freak established Pokémon Center Co., Ltd. in order to effectively manage the Pokémon Center stores in Japan. After the popularity of Pokémon Gold and Silver, they received many merchandising proposals from around the world. Companies were interested in working with the Pokémon brand. At that time, Tsunekazu Ishihara of Creatures was the person in charge of approving licensed products. Because of the sheer volume of products, Ishihara thought it was too much work for one person to handle. At the same time, in order for the franchise to continue, Ishihara wished to further expand the franchise with long-term goals, such as continuing the TV series, and releasing a movie every year. It was then decided that a new organization was needed in order to gather together all the strands of brand management.

This led the three companies to turn Pokémon Center Co., Ltd. into The Pokémon Company in order to further expand its scope, responsibilities, and areas of business. According to Satoru Iwata, establishing The Pokémon Company was one of his first projects at Nintendo.

Managing the Pokémon Center stores is still a pillar for the company. In total, there are stores in 11 locations: Sapporo, Tohoku (Sendai), Tokyo, Skytree Town (Oshiage), Tokyo-Bay (Chiba), Yokohama, Nagoya, Kyoto, Osaka, Hiroshima and Fukuoka.

The United States branch (Pokémon USA, Inc.) opened in 2001 to handle licensing overseas in the Americas. Nintendo Australia is responsible for some licensing and marketing of Pokémon products in Australia and New Zealand because The Pokémon Company does not have an Australian branch.

Since 2001, nearly all Pokémon products are represented as "©Pokémon" in the copyright acknowledgments with the original three owners of "©Nintendo", "©GAME FREAK inc." and "©Creatures Inc." The three companies also have ownership of all of the Pokémon-related trademarks in Japan while Nintendo is the sole owner of Pokémon-related trademarks in other countries. Licensed toys are made by third- and second-party companies such as Tomy and Jazwares.

In October 2001, 4Kids Entertainment acquired a 3% stake in The Pokémon Company for an undisclosed sum. They liquidated this stake 4 years later for US$960,000.

In 2006, Pokémon Korea, Inc. was founded to manage the company's operations in South Korea. Its headquarters is located in Seoul.

In 2009, Pokémon USA and Pokémon UK merged to become The Pokémon Company International, which handles American and European Pokémon operations under the administration of Kenji Okubo. The company's office in the United States is located in Bellevue, Washington, at the Lincoln Square complex; the headquarters is planned to move in January 2025 to another high-rise building in Bellevue where it will occupy sixteen stories. The Pokémon Company International's office in the United Kingdom is located in London. Some Australian operations are controlled by Nintendo Australia.

Pokémon Center Co., Ltd. was established in August 2011 to manage the Pokémon Center brand and stores in Japan. Its operations include operating the Pokémon Store and Pokémon Center stores, maintaining the Pokémon Stand vending machines and operating the Pokémon Center Online, as well as overseeing the design and manufacture of Japanese Pokémon Center brand merchandise. Yomiomi Uego is currently the president and CEO.

In April 2022, The Pokémon Company International announced the acquisition of Millennium Print Group for an undisclosed sum. The printing company has already been producing and packing cards for the Pokémon Trading Card Game since 2015 after partnering up with The Pokémon Company. The move will not have a major effect on Millennium's day-to-day productions, with the company still operating as a separate entity; The Pokémon Company will instead be providing "investment and industry expertise" while assisting Millennium in expanding its capabilities and infrastructure.

On June 1, 2022, it was announced that Game Freak co-founder Junichi Masuda left the company and would be part of The Pokémon Company at a position called Chief Creative Fellow, being more involved with the franchise as a whole instead of just the video games.

In March 2024, The Pokémon Company and ILCA established a new subsidiary joint venture called the Pokémon Works to develop and support future Pokémon projects.

In April 26th, DeNA and The Pokémon Company renamed DeNA Digital Production Co. Ltd to be Pokémon Card D Studio Ltd., this company is to help develop and manage the mobile game Pokémon Trading Card Game Pocket. 66.6% ownership by DeNA, 33.4% ownership by The Pokémon Company.

In January 2026, The Pokémon Company and NBCUniversal announced that new Pokémon experiences would be coming to the theme park, first to Universal Studios Japan, and then to Universal Destinations & Experiences' other theme parks.

In February 2026, The Pokémon Company International announced the acquisition of Excell Brands, a U.S. distributor of trading cards and collectibles

== Business structure ==
- The Pokémon Company
  - The Pokémon Company International
    - The Pokémon Company International Ireland Limited
    - The Pokémon Company International Mexico, S. de R.L. de C.V.
    - Millennium Print Group
      - Mouthaan Boekdruk en Offset B.V.
      - Triangle Sourcing LLC dba Longistics
    - Excell Brands
  - Pokémon Korea, Inc.
  - Pokémon Center Co., Ltd.
  - Pokémon Singapore Pte. Ltd.
  - Pokémon Shanghai
  - Pokémon Taiwan Co., Ltd.
  - PokéPark Kanto
  - The Pokémon Works K.K.
  - Pokémon (Thailand) Co., Ltd.

== List of works ==
=== Games & TCG ===
- Pokémon video game series
  - List of Pokémon video games
- Pokémon Trading Card Game
- Pokémon Trading Figure Game

=== Anime ===
- Pokémon anime television series
- Pokémon anime film series

=== Books ===
- Pokémon manga

=== Live-action film ===
- Pokémon Detective Pikachu

== See also ==
- List of highest-grossing media franchises
