= Fluffy, Fluffy Cinnamoroll =

Manga series for children

ふわふわ♥シナモン (Fuwa Fuwa Shinamon)
- Genre: Comedy
- Manga
- Written by: Yumi Tsukirino; Chisato Seki
- Illustrated by: Yumi Tsukirino
- Magazine: Pucchigumi
- Original run: August 2005 – March 2008
- Volumes: 5

Fluffy, Fluffy Cinnamoroll (ふわふわ♥シナモン, Fuwa Fuwa Shinamon) is a full-color manga series written and illustrated by Yumi Tsukirino and based on an original story by Chisato Seki. Aimed at elementary school girls, it stars the Sanrio character Cinnamoroll and was released in North America by the Vizkids line of Viz Media. It was originally serialized in Japan from 2005 through 2008 in Pucchigumi.

Jonathan Clements and Helen McCarthy, authors of The Anime Encyclopedia: A Century of Japanese Animation, described Fluffy, Fluffy Cinnamoroll as "sugar-sweet".

== Plot ==
This series tells the story of a cloud puppy who learns how to fly and moves into a café. The cafe's owner believes that the puppy's tail looks like a cinnamon roll, so the owner gives him the name "Cinnamoroll". He and his friends go on adventures and face the antagonist, a dark cloud named Cavity.

== Characters ==
Cinnamoroll/Cinnamon (シナモン, Shinamon)
Cinnamoroll (Born March 6) is a male white and chubby puppy with long ears that enables him to fly. He has blue eyes, pink cheeks and a plump, curly tail that resembles a cinnamon roll. The owner of Cafe Cinnamon, a little cafe, looked up and saw a white puppy floating out of the sky like a fluffy cloud. The owner thought that he came because he smelled her cinnamon rolls. The puppy has a curly tail just like a cinnamon roll, so she called him Cinnamon. Cinnamon became instantly popular with customers and soon became Café Cinnamon's official mascot. Now, when he is not napping on the café terrace, Cinnamon flies around the town looking for fun and new adventures with his friends.
Mocha (モカ, Moka)
Mocha (Born February 20) is a female puppy living in a white house on top of a hill. She's a stylish chatterbox and also the "big sister" of the bunch, always looking out for others. Mocha is known for her silky chocolate-brown fur and her pink bows with flowers. She has a crush on Cinnamoroll and loves fashion and getting dressed up but doesn't like bell peppers or bugs. She is the girly girl of the group. In the Manga, Mocha's fur color is light brown and she is seen wearing different hair accessories besides her pink flowers. Alongside Chiffon and Azuki, they make up the three-girl idol group Cinnamoangels.
Espresso (エスプレッソ, Esupuresso)
Espresso (Born December 4) is a male puppy living near the park in the biggest house around. Espresso is very intelligent and well-bred, but he gets lonely and whines sometimes. He's known for his distinguished Mozart hairstyle. His owner is a famous actress, and his dad is a well-known movie director. Espresso is especially good at drawing, painting and music. But he can't sleep without his favorite blanket which makes him whine and cry like a sad puppy so very much. In the Manga, He wears a red or green Beret and red or green Kerchief.
Cappuccino (カプチーノ, Kapuchīno)
Cappuccino (Born June 27) is a male puppy living in the house with the red roof across the street from Cafe Cinnamon. He likes to go at his own pace, eat a lot, and take many naps. Cappuccino is easy to recognize by his mouth, which is just like a cup of cappuccino and likes eating, but his favorite thing of all is napping. He is the glutton of the bunch and very chubby. He also loves bug catching which is his favorite activity.
Chiffon (シフォン, Shifon)
Chiffon (Born January 14) is a female puppy living right by a lush, green park and is the most energetic of the pups. Chiffon inspires her friends and doesn't sweat the small stuff. Her ears, which are fluffy like a chiffon cake, are her standout feature. She is also a Tomboy and she loves to play tennis. She has a sensitive side when it comes to animals. She loves sports and dreams of winning a gold medal at the Olympics one day. Cinnamoroll has a crush on her and is also an animal lover. Alongside Mocha and Azuki, they make up the three-girl idol group Cinnamonangels. Chiffon's ear and tail color are usually brown, though sometimes it's colored orange as seen in the manga and very rarely pink.
Milk (みるく, Miruku)
Milk (February 4) is a baby male pup living close to the park in a house with a chimney. The smallest and youngest of the pups, he likes being cuddled and will whine and cry if he doesn't have his favorite pacifier. Milk can be recognized by his blue Pacifier and the single curl of baby hair on top of his head. He can get spoiled sometimes. He wants to be just like Cinnamoroll when he grows up. His pacifier is his most prized possession, and he's skilled at gulping down large quantities of milk. Milk can't talk so the only words he can say are "Ba-Boo".
Cornet (コルネ, Korune)
Cornet is a unicorn kid who lives in the sky above the clouds. His horn is shaped like an ice cream cone.
Coco (ココ, Koko)
Coco (Born August 10) is baby male pup who wears a red scarf around his neck. He, along with his twin brother Nuts, was rescued by Cinnamoroll when a white Stork got shocked by lightning during a thunderstorm, causing the bag to fall from its beak. Cinnamon quickly flew down to catch the bag that the stork was carrying. By the time Cinnamon landed on the ground. He opened the bag to reveal that two newborn puppies were inside. Cinnamon then carried Coco and Nuts to Cafe Cinnamon to give them a new home. Coco's fur color is light brown and has a white spot on his mouth like his big brother Cappuccino and his twin brother Nuts. Coco and his brother Nuts both have different style ears. Coco and Nuts both appear in the 5th volume of the manga, where Cinnamon babysits the two while Cappuccino is away.
Nuts (ナッツ, Nattsu)
Nuts (Born August 10) is a baby male pup who wears a blue scarf around his neck. He is more curious than his brother Coco and is often seen sleeping. Nut's fur color is the same as Coco's fur color. Nuts along with his twin brother Coco appear in the 5th volume of the manga, where Cinnamon babysits the two while Cappuccino is away.
Cinnamon Angels (シナモエンジェルス, shinamoenjerusu)
Are a trio of trendy puppies formed by Mocha (whose birthday is the 20th February), Chiffon (whose birthday is the 14th January) and Azuki (Whose birthday is September 25). The founder of the group Mocha, has big dreams of becoming a TV idol and both Azuki and Chiffon support her. The three were released by Sanrio in 2005[32] and has several Music Videos featuring the trio. The Cinnamoangels also show up in the third volume of Fluffy, Fluffy Cinnamoroll and even have their own stories and adventures. Most of the time in the manga, the Cinnamoangels attempt to see "The Caramels" a boy band and each of the Angels have a crush on each member. Mocha is a huge fan of the main singer of the band, and tries her hardest to see the guys in person to the annoyance of Chiffon and Azuki.
Azuki (アズキ, Azuki)
Azuki (Born August10) is a female puppy who dreams to become an idol. She is ladylike but sometimes a little bit off in terms of personality. She is in charge of the Cinnamoangels' manners, fortune-telling and also practices calligraphy and flower arrangement in hopes of becoming a true Japanese lady.

== Reception and legacy ==
Issue #3 of the comic was #9 on The New York Times manga best sellers list for April 29-May 5.

Rebecca Silverman of the Anime News Network ranked the series "B" overall, "B−" for the story, and "B" for the art. Silverman argued that the book has a "sweet story, simple art, and bright colors" that appeal to its intended audience, although the book would not hold the interest of an adult reader; she stated "All in all," the first two volumes of the series "provide a nice transition from the picture book to the chapter book, or simply an alternative for the reluctant reader."

The series resulted in increased attention towards a Cinnamoroll movie.
