= Iwata =

Iwata may refer to:

- Iwata, Shizuoka, city located in Shizuoka, Japan
- Iwata (surname)
  - Satoru Iwata, former president and CEO of Nintendo
- Júbilo Iwata, professional Japanese football club
