= Kyoko =

- Gender: Female

Origin
- Origin: Japanese
- Meaning: The name has several meanings, depending on the kanji used, but its typical meaning is "Girl of Kyoto". (Kyoto is a city in Japan.)
- Region of origin: Japan

Other names
- Related names: Kiyoko

Kyōko, Kyoko, Kyouko, or Kyohko (きょうこ, キョウコ, 京子) is a very common feminine Japanese given name, not to be confused with Kiyoko.

== Written forms ==
The final syllable "ko" is typically written with the kanji character for child, 子. It is a common suffix to female names in Japan. The first syllable "Kyō" can be written several different ways, with different meanings.

- 恭, "respectful,"
- 京, "of the city or of the capital,"
- 今日, "of today,"
- 杏, "apricot,"
- 鏡, "mirror,"
- 響, "echo", "influential"

The name can also be written in hiragana or katakana.

== People with the name ==
- Kyōko Aizome (愛染 恭子; born 1958), Japanese porn actress, singer, writer and AV and film director
- Kyoko Ariyoshi (有吉 京子; born 1950), Japanese shōjo manga artist
- Kyoko Asakura (朝倉 響子; 1925–2016), Japanese sculptor
- Kyōko Asanuma (浅沼 享子; 1904–1981), Japanese politician
- Kyoko Date (伊達 杏子), Japanese virtual influencer
- Kyoko Chan Cox, the daughter of Yoko Ono and jazz musician Anthony Cox
- Kyoko Cuomo (née Ito), wife of Rivers Cuomo
- Kyoko Enami (江波 杏子; 1942–2018), Japanese film and television actress
- Kyoko Fukada (深田 恭子; born 1982), Japanese actress, model and singer
- Kyoko Funahashi (舟橋 京子), Japanese bioarchaeologist
- Kyoko Hamaguchi (浜口 京子; born 1978), Japanese freestyle wrestler
- Kyōko Hasegawa (長谷川 京子; born 1978), Japanese model and actress
- Kyoko Hashimoto (橋本 杏子; born 1964), Japanese model, pink film actress
- Kyoko Hayashi (林 京子; 1930–2017), Japanese writer
- Kyōko Hikami (氷上 恭子; born 1969), Japanese voice actress
- Kyoko Hinami (日南 響子; born 1994), Japanese gravure idol and actress
- Kyoko Hosokawa (細川 恭子; born 1999), Japanese rugby union player
- Kyoko Ina (伊奈 恭子; born 1972), American figure skater
- Kyoko Inoue (井上 京子; born 1969), Japanese professional wrestler
- Kyoko Iriye Selden (入江 恭子; 1936–2013), Japanese scholar
- Kyoko Ishida (石田 京子; born 1960), Japanese volleyball player
- Kyoko Iwasaki (岩崎 恭子; born 1978), Japanese swimming coach and retired Olympic swimmer
- Kyoko Izawa (井沢 京子; born 1962), Japanese politician
- Kyōko Kagawa (香川 京子; born 1931), Japanese actress
- Kyoko Kano, an older sister of the Japanese celebrities Kano Sisters
- Kyoko Kasuya (粕谷 恭子; born 1975), Japanese former swimmer
- Kyoko Katashita (片下 恭子; born 1989), Japanese volleyball player
- Kyōko Kazama (風間 恭子; born 1931), Japanese AV idol and pink film actress
- Kyoko Kimura (木村 響子; born 1977), Japanese professional wrestler and mixed martial artist
- Kyoko Kinoshita (木下 亨子; born 1963), Japanese sport shooter
- Kyōko Kishida (岸田 今日子; 1930–2006), Japanese actress, voice actress, and children's book writer
- Kyoko Kitahara (北原 京子; born 1951), Japanese archer
- Kyoko Kitamura (born 1970), Japanese-American musician
- Kyoko Kobayashi (小林 京子; born 1972), Japanese softball player
- Kyoko Koizumi (小泉 今日子; born 1966), Japanese singer and actress
- Kyoko Kubota (久保田 恭子; born 1933), Japanese gymnast
- Kyoko Kudo (工藤 恭子; born 2001), Japanese water polo player
- Kyoko Kuroda (黒田 今日子; born 1969), Japanese former football player
- Kyoko Mano (真野 郷子; born 1956), Japanese gymnast
- Kyoko Matsuoka (松岡 享子; 1935–2022), Japanese librarian, translator, and expert in children's literature
- Kyoko Mizuki (水木 杏子; born 1949), Japanese writer
- Kyoko Mochida (持田 京子; born 1974), Japanese softball player
- Kyōko Nagatsuka (長塚 京子; born 1974), Japanese former professional tennis player
- Kyoko Nakajima (中島 京子; born 1964), Japanese writer
- Kyōko Nakano (中野 京子), Japanese scholar
- Kyoko Nakayama (中山 恭子; born 1940), Japanese politician
- Kyoko Narumi (鳴海 杏子; born 1986), Japanese female voice actress and singer
- Kyoko Nishikawa (西川 京子; born 1945), Japanese political activist
- Kyoko Nozaki (野崎 京子; born 1964), Japanese chemist
- Kyoko Okazaki (岡崎 京子; born 1963), Japanese manga artist
- Kyoko Oshima (大島 杏子; born 1986), Japanese former artistic gymnast
- Kyōko Saitō (齊藤 京子; born 1997), Japanese actress, television presenter, singer and model
- Kyoko Sasage (捧 匡子; born 1969), Japanese badminton player
- Kyoko Sato (佐藤 京子; born 1966), Japanese Paralympian athlete
- Kyoko Sato (curator), Japanese curator, editor, and former television producer
- Kyoko Seo (瀬尾 京子; born 1972), Japanese gymnast
- Kyoko Shimazaki (島崎 京子; born 1972), Japanese speed skater
- Kyoko Sone (曽根 恭子; born 1969), Japanese professional pool player
- Kyōko Takada (高田 恭子; born 1948), Japanese singer
- Kyoko Takezawa (竹澤 恭子; born 1966), Japanese violinist
- Kyoko Terase (寺瀬 今日子; born 1958), Japanese voice actress
- Kyōko Tongū (頓宮 恭子; born 1956), Japanese voice actress
- Kyoko Toyokawa, Japanese make-up artist and hairstylist
- Kyoko Uchida (内田 恭子; born 1976), Germany born-Japanese free announcer
- Kyoko Uchida (writer), Japanese‑American poet, prose writer, and translator
- Kyoko Uchiyama (内山 京子; born 1968), Japanese table tennis player
- Kyoko Yamada (山田 恭子; born 1959), Japanese voice actress
- Kyoko Yamazaki (山崎 京子; born 1954), Japanese archer
- Kyoko Yano (矢野 喬子; born 1984), Japanese former football player
- Kyoko Yoneda (米陀 京子; born 1931), Japanese athlete
- Kyoko Yonemoto (米元 響子; born 1984), Japanese classical music violinist
- Kyoko Yoshine (芳根 京子; born 1997), Japanese actress

== Fictional characters ==
- Kyoko, a To-Oh University student in the anime and manga series Death Note
- Kyoko, a friendly home computer in the 2008 Janet Jackson album Discipline
- Kyoko, servant to Blue Book CEO Nathan Bateman in Ex Machina
- Kyoko, a character in the 2008 television film iGo to Japan, part of the iCarly TV series
- Kyoko (京子), a character in Kore wa Zombie Desu ka?
- Kyoko (キョウコ), a young woman who comes to New York City to find a man who taught her to dance salsa, from the novel Kyoko by Ryū Murakami
- Kyoko (鏡子), a character in Yukio Mishima's Kyoko no Ie
- Kyoko (キョウコ), a character in Log Horizon
- Kyōko (きょうこ), a character in Shin Nekketsu Kōha: Kunio-tachi no Banka and later River City Girls
- Kyōko Ayasato (綾里 供子) (Ami Fey), a character in the Ace Attorney franchise
- Kyoko Harase (原瀬 京子), a character in the 2003 J-Horror film Ju-on: The Grudge 2
- Kyoko Himeji (姫路 京子), a character from Girl's High
- Kyoko Hoin (宝院 京子), a character in Kodomo no Jikan
- Kyoko Honda (本田 今日子), a character in the manga and anime series Fruits Basket
- Kyoko Hori (堀 京子), the main female protagonist of the manga and anime Hori-san to Miyamura-kun (Horimiya)
- Kyōko Igarashi (五十嵐 響子), a character in The Idolmaster Cinderella Girls
- Kyoko Iwase (岩瀬 恭子), a racing character from Initial D series
- Kyōko Kasodani (幽谷 響子), a character in Ten Desires from the Touhou Project series
- Kyoko Kirigiri (霧切 響子), Ultimate Detective in the game Danganronpa Trigger Happy Havoc
- Kyoko Kirisaki (キリサキ＝キョウコ), a fictional pyrokinetic from the Black Cat manga
- Kyōko Kuremi (暮海 杏子), a character in Digimon Story: Cyber Sleuth
- Kyoko Manabe (真鍋 杏子), a character from Destroy all Monsters, one of the films of the Godzilla franchise
- Kyoko Minazuki (水無月 響子), a playable character in the fighting game series Rival Schools
- Kyoko Mogami (最上 キョーコ), the main heroine of the shōjo manga Skip Beat!
- Kyoko Okitegami (掟上 今日子), the main character in Okitegami Kyoko no Biboroku
- Kyoko Okudera (奥寺 杏子), the main female protagonist in the Japanese horror movie Chakushin Ari 2
- Kyoko Otonashi (音無 響子), the female protagonist of the manga and anime series Maison Ikkoku
- Kyoko Ozaki (尾崎 恭子) the wife of Doctor Toshio Ozaki in the anime, manga, and novel, Shiki
- Kyoko Sakura (佐倉 杏子), a character in Puella Magi Madoka Magica
- Kyoko Sasagawa (笹川 京子), a character in the anime series Katekyo Hitman REBORN!
- Kyōko Shirafuji (白藤 杏子), a female character in the manga and anime series Working!!.
- Kyoko Zeppelin Soryu (惣流・キョウコ・ツェッペリン, Sōryū Kyōko Tsepperin), a character in the anime series Neon Genesis Evangelion
- Kyoko Takimoto (滝本 恭子), a character in the novel and anime film I Want to Eat Your Pancreas
- Kyōko Tōno (桃乃 今日子), a character in Seiren
- Kyoko Toshinō (歳納 京子), a character in Yuru Yuri

== Fiction works ==
- Kyoko, a novel by Ryū Murakami
- Kyoko or, in English, Because of You, a film inspired by Ryū Murakami's book
- Kyoko, a 2000 film by New Concorde
