= Tanahashi =

Tanahashi (written: 棚橋) is a Japanese surname. Notable people with the surname include

- Ayako Tanahashi (棚橋绚子, 1839–1939), Japanese educator
- Haruhiko Tanahashi (棚橋 晴彦), Japanese automotive engineer
- Hiroshi Tanahashi (棚橋 弘至; born 1976), Japanese professional wrestler
- Kazuaki Tanahashi (棚橋 一晃; born 1933), Japanese calligrapher, Zen teacher, writer and translator
- Shisui Tanahashi (棚橋 紫水; 1906–1991), Japanese photographer
- Yasufumi Tanahashi (棚橋 泰文; born 1963), Japanese politician
