= Kiyomi (given name) =

Kiyomi (Japanese: 清美) is a Japanese feminine given name, composed of either 聖 (kiyo), meaning "holy, sacred" or 清 (kiyo), meaning "pure, clean", and 美 (mi), meaning "beautiful". Notable people with the given name include:

- Kiyomi Asai (浅井 清己; born 1974), Japanese voice actress
- Funya no Kiyomi (文室 浄三; 693–770), Japanese nobleman and politician
- Kiyomi Hayama (羽山 紀代美; 1945–2023), Japanese choreographer
- Kiyomi Ishida (石田 清美; born 1968), Japanese table tennis player
- Kiyomi Ito (speed skater) (伊藤 清美; born 1949), Japanese speed skater
- Kiyomi Itō (伊藤 清美; born 1959), Japanese actress
- Kiyomi Iwata (born 1941), Japanese-American textile artist
- Kiyomi Kato (volleyball) (加藤 きよみ; born 1953), Japanese volleyball player and Olympic champion
- Kiyomi Kato (wrestler) (加藤 喜代美; born 1948), Japanese retired flyweight freestyle wrestler
- Kiyomi Niwata (庭田 清美; born 1970), Japanese triathlete
- Kiyomi Sakamoto (坂本 清美; born 1969), Japanese volleyball player
- Kiyomi Sato (佐藤 清美; born 1962), Japanese basketball coach
- Kiyomi Takahashi (高橋 清美; born 1966), Japanese swimmer
- Kiyomi Tsujimoto (辻元 清美; born 1960), Japanese politician
- Kiyomi Waller (born 1967), American BMX racer
- Kiyomi Watanabe (渡辺 聖未; born 1996), Japanese-Filipino judoka

== Fictional ==
- Kiyomi Takada, Death Note character

== See also ==
- Kiyomi, a citrus fruit
- Kiyomi, Gifu, a village in Gifu Prefecture, Japan
