= Magical Pokémon Journey =

Japanese manga series

- Volume #5 of the manga cover art.

ポケットモンスター PiPiPi★アドベンチャー (Poketto Monsutā PiPiPi★Adobenchā)
- Manga
- Written by: Yumi Tsukirino
- Published by: Shogakukan
- English publisher: NA: Viz Media; SG: Chuang Yi
- Magazine: Ciao
- Original run: July 1997 – February 2003
- Volumes: 10

Magical Pokémon Journey, originally published in Japan as Pocket Monsters PiPiPi ★ Adventures (ポケットモンスター PiPiPi★アドベンチャー, Poketto Monsutā PiPiPi★Adobenchā), is a shōjo manga series set in the fictional universe of the Pokémon franchise. The manga is by Yumi Tsukirino and serialized by Shogakukan in the manga magazine Ciao, and collected in ten bound volumes. The series is not based on any particular video game, and it is the first shōjo Pokémon manga series released in the United States. The original Japanese title "PiPiPi" refers to Purin, Pippi, and Pikachu, the respective Japanese names of Jigglypuff, Clefairy, and Pikachu.

The main character, Hazel (Maron in Japanese), sets off to catch Pokémon after a scientist named Grandpa agrees to make a love potion if she catches Pokémon. Hazel is after the heart of a boy named Almond. Most of the Pokémon in the manga series can speak a human language.

The manga is licensed in English in North America by Viz Media and in Singapore by Chuang Yi. Viz published seven of the ten volumes flipped to the Western left-to-right format.

A spinoff series, Pocket Monsters Chamo-Chamo ★ Pretty ♪ (ポケットモンスター チャモチャモ★ぷりてぃ♪, Pocketto Monsutā Chamochamo★Puriti♪), features the adventures and exploits of Clefairy and Pikachu, as well as Torchic and Mightyena. The chamo-chamo refers to "Achamo", Torchic's Japanese name.

== Characters ==
=== Humans ===
Hazel (マロン, Maron)
The main character of this series. Described by VIZ as "cute" and "energetic", she is madly in love with her friend Almond, and adores cute Pokémon such as Pikachu and Clefairy. As a child, she was an irrepressible tomboy who enjoyed playing pranks on Almond; now that she is older, she is still quite hyper, but in a more girlish way.
Almond (アーモンド, Āmondo)
The love interest of the series, described by VIZ as "good-looking". He calls himself a Pokémon trainer, but it is not known what Pokémon he has, or even if he has any besides Squirtle, who is more of a friend than a trained Pokémon. Almond shows little to no interest in either Hazel or Coconut, until the final volume. A VIZ webpage hints that Hazel's "affection" towards Almond is more like an "obsession."
Coconut (ココナッツ, Kokonattsu)
Grandpa's granddaughter, and Hazel's rival for Almond's love. She is a brilliant scientist, and so spends much of her time brewing love potions that backfire in some manner, usually injuring her Eevee. Later on, a man named Caraway confesses his love for Coconut, but she isn't interested.
Grandpa (じーちゃん, Jii-chan)
Isn't Hazel's grandfather, as she points out to Almond when Coconut first appears. He's simply a crazy old man whom everybody calls "Grandpa". He likes to ogle young women, even though he's married to Ginger. He made Hazel the outfit she wears much of the time; it has magical properties that can protect her from injury and even drowning. Owns POG Inc., but left because running a business isn't fun, and Ginger took over for him.
Peanut (ピース, Pīsu)
A sickly boy who recently moved to Hazel's town for reasons related to his health. His Pokémon is a hotheaded Charmander. His bad health is caused by a mass of dark qi surrounding him; he is able to communicate with and control this qi, which is quite unusual.
Pistachio (ピスタチオ, Pisutachio)
Peanut's brother, a florist who has a thing for Hazel. Due to a mix-up on Viz's website, many people believe that in the Japanese version of the manga, he's really attracted to Almond; however, this is not true. Pistachio's Bulbasaur, named Danerina, has a crush on him, as does Chiko the Chikorita.
Walnut (ウォール, Wōru)
A ninja-in-training under the great ninja master Ditto. He's a bumbling goof, though. When he's not training, he works in his family's bakery. Wal wears glasses when not training, and contact lenses when in ninja uniform.
Sandy (ナギサ, Nagisa)
A 150-year-old ghost. When she first appears, Raichu is angry with her. Sandy's parents left him in a box by the ocean because he had a tendency to shock people, and Sandy promised to meet him there; however, just before they could meet, they were both killed by a tidal wave. Once Sandy explains this, Raichu forgives her and they are able to "cross over". They appear in later chapters to help pacify an angry Golduck ghost, and are reincarnated in the final volume.
Apricot (小梅, Koume)
First appears in the eighth volume. She is also a ninja-in-training, though she's much more accomplished than Walnut. Her master, Azumarill, is even more talented than Ditto; Azumarill's daughter, a Marill named Marimaru, is Koume's partner. Apricot is addicted to bread, and winds up falling in love with Walnut.
Plum (プラム, Puramu)
First appears in the ninth volume. She's an exorcist nurse who travels around with her senior, a Chansey, exorcising bad qi. She discovers the reason for Peanut's ill health, but she is unable to exorcise it. She falls in love with Peanut.
Caraway (キャラウェイ, Kyarawei)
First appears in the tenth and final volume. As soon as he meets Coconut, he falls for her and kisses her on the lips. Because of this, Coconut absolutely refuses to even give him a chance, until he helps her with an experiment she's working on. After that, she becomes friends with Caraway, but still isn't romantically interested in him.
Ginger (ジンジャー, Jinjā)
First appears in the seventh volume. She is Grandpa's wife. She came to issue him a challenge "Win best inventions prize at the upcoming inventors contest or move back home." She has a Natu and Girafarig. She is currently running POG Inc.

Haruka (ハルカ, Haruka)
A character featured in the spin-off series after obtaining her first Pokémon, Torchic. She is based on, or as largely same as May from Pokémon anime series, with only costumes changed.

=== Pokémon characters ===
Pikachu (ピカチュウ, Pikachuu)
The first Pokémon to appear in this series, is Hazel's best friend -- not surprising, as both of them can be described as scatterbrains. Pikachu is one of the few Pokémon in MPJ who cannot speak human language. Pikachu appears as a male one.
Clefairy (ピッピ, Pippi)
Hazel's second Pokémon friend, and is a scaredy cat. He dislikes battling because he views himself as weak, even though his Metronome technique is quite powerful. He also uses Minimize often, usually when he gets frightened (which can happen at the drop of a hat).
Jigglypuff (プリン, Purin)
A spoiled princess Pokémon whose family lives in a castle. Jigglypuff loves to cook, but she's terrible at it while looks delicious at first glance. Not seeming to realize this, she gets horribly offended when nobody wants to eat the food she makes.
Squirtle (ゼニガメ, Zenigame)
The only boy Pokémon to live at the Jigglypuff mansion. He calls Almond his "big brother", but at the same time seems to be absorbed by him.
Eevee (イーブイ, Iibui)
Coconut's Pokémon and lab assistant. He's usually in the way when her experiments go wrong, and is quite an unlucky fellow. In the sixth volume, he meets and falls in love with...
Lu (るー, Rū)
A female Eevee. At first, she loved Eevee from afar, but she managed to confess her feelings to him at the prompting of Hazel and Coconut. Later, she has to move away, but she occasionally visits Eevee.
Charmander (ヒトカゲ, Hitokage)
Peanut's companion, and his fiery temper is in stark contrast to the boy's quiet personality. Charmander gets angry when things don't go his way, which happens more often than not. At first he seemed to have a thing for Coconut's Eevee (who is male), but in later volumes he seems more attracted to Chiko.
Bulbasaur (ダネリーナ, Danerīna)
Danerina is Pistachio's Bulbasaur. She seems to be possessive and will get angry if Pistachio talks to other women.
Ditto (ビー, Bī)
Wal's ninja master. He's a quite accomplished ninja, even though he's just a pink blob.
Marimaru (マリ丸, Marimaru)
The Marill is Koume's ninja partner, both of them training under Marimaru's mother, Azumarill.
Roko (ロコ, Roko) and Arashi (アラシ, Arashi)
Two of Caraway's Pokémon. Roko the Vulpix (Rokon is the Japanese name of Vulpix) has a thing for Arashi the Cyndaquil (Hinoarashi is the Japanese name of Cyndaquil), despite his being somewhat dim-witted. They meet Coconut while searching for a Fire Stone.
Chansey (ラッキー, Rakkī)
Plum's senior, an exorcist nurse. She uses her magical egg powers in conjunction with Plum's cross to purify people troubled by bad qi.
Raichu (ライチュウ, Raichuu)
Sandy's Pokémon, was abandoned by the shore.
Chiko (チコ, Chiko)
Appears in order to challenge Danerina the Bulbasaur's claim on Pistachio. They have a contest to see which one is good enough to him, with Chiko winning. However, Pistachio prefers Danerina's company, as she is his Pokémon and Chiko is an interloper. (But Pistachio's not thrilled with the Pokémon being in love with him....) After this, Chikorita falls in love with Almond, and then with Charmander.
Yousuke (ヨウスケ, Yousuke)
A male Bayleef belonging to a traveling psychic named Akira. He has a thing for Chiko, but she prefers Charmander.
Azumarill (マリルリ, Mariruri; Marilli)

Azumarill is Apricot's ninja teacher and Marimaru's mother.

Torchic (アチャモ, Achamo)
Owned by Haruka, Torchic quickly meets and becomes friends with Pikachu and Clefairy, and then meets Poochyena, with whom she winds up arguing frequently. Soon after that, she meets Mightyena, Poochyena's older brother, who she falls in love with. Torchic dreads the thought of ever evolving. She believes that Combusken and Blaziken are ugly Pokémon and can't stand the thought of not being cute and adorable anymore.
Poochyena (ポチエナ, Pochaena)
Owned by Kanata, Poochyena is introduced where Torchic mistakes him as a Prince Charming. Poochyena doesn't get along with Torchic at all; he calls her "shorty" and she calls him "hick-Poochy". However, he congratulates her for doing well in a Contest, and comforts her when she's upset at times.
Mightyena (グラエナ, Guraena)
The older brother of Poochyena, Mightyena meets Torchic and falls in love with her. Unlike his brother, he is considered to be much more tolerant with Torchic.

=== Other Pokémon characters ===
Articuno
A male legendary-bird Pokémon, he was thought to have trapped souls of lost travelers in the mountains however, he only appears as a friendly and cheerful-looking Pokémon that runs a snowcone shop. He challenges Pikachu, Clefairy and Jigglypuff by making them eat 50 snowcones. He also saved Hazel who was injured by skiing in the mountains.
Onix
A harmless and friendly rock snake Pokémon, he only appears to save humans. However, he also appears as a challenging boss character, to battle against humans. He is defeated by Almond's Squirtle with his Water Gun attack, and rewards both the humans and Pokémon a legendary stone.
Tangela
A Pokémon that resembles a tangle of vines with a small face hidden in the center. Hazel wants to see what Tangela's face looks like beneath the vines. However, Tangela is frightened by the intrusive Hazel and constricts her. Luckily, the confusion is settled and Tangela, who communicates by pressing a vine to a person's forehead, agrees to let Hazel see its face. Though because of her clumsy painting skills, still no one knows how Tangela looks like of except Hazel.
Dragonair
A male dragon Pokémon, he appears in the sky snowing. Although he is cold-blooded when he met Jigglypuff, Jigglypuff asked him where Articuno's hideout was, so he leads their way to where his hideout is.
Jynx
A fortune-teller, she can read minds from both humans and Pokémon with her magic ball. Arbok tries to tell her he's in love with Jigglypuff's sister, Wigglytuff. She had nothing to do with making Arbok fall in love with Wigglytuff.
Pidgeot
In love with Pidgetta, leading the three Pidgeotto (Pidgeot's servants and henchmen), Hazel's mistaken them for eating Pikachu but tied him up as a gift to Pidgetta, he'll do anything to win her back.
Pidgetta
A female Pidgeotto, she dislikes Pidgeot by bringing gifts and other items to match her beauty, but she only wants the wilted flower that was picked by Hazel. She finally falls in love with him again.
Golbat
Most vicious and unfriendly vampire bat Pokémon, they can hunt down other any Pokémon in the dark caves, they attack intruders by finding them with their sonic waves.
Ditto
Shape-shifters, these Dittos are found at the hot springs resort. Once they shifted into a bunch of Pikachu and Hazel and the others had a little trouble with that. They apologized and left after some time of tricking them. No relation to Ditto the ninja master.
Treecko (キモリ, Kimori)
A wood gecko Pokémon who likes to pluck Torchic's feathers. He has two sisters, Grovyle and Sceptile.
Ralts, Kirlia and Gardevoir (ラルトス・キルリア・サーナイト, Rarutosu, Kiruria and Sanaito)
Antagonists in Chamo-Chamo Pretty sequel as they fighting with Torchic and Poochyena for not getting chocolates during Valentine's Day.

== Volumes and chapters ==
Bk Volume	Chapter#	Japanese Title	English Title
Volume 1: A Party with Pikachu	1	はじめまして ピカチュウ	How Do You Do, Pikachu?
Volume 1: A Party with Pikachu	2	がんばれ！ピッピくん	Clefairy Comes Through
Volume 1: A Party with Pikachu	3	プレティ—プリンちゃん	Oh, That Cute, Cute Jigglypuff!
Volume 1: A Party with Pikachu	4	モンジャラくんの秘密	Tangela's Secret
Volume 1: A Party with Pikachu	5	ピカチュウの大事件	The First Labor Of Pikachu
Volume 1: A Party with Pikachu	6	ラブラブクリスマス	Christmas Wishes
Volume 1: A Party with Pikachu	Bonus 1	タッツーくんの首飾り	Horsea's Necklace
Volume 1: A Party with Pikachu	Bouns 2	きもだめしでドッキドキ	Wh-Who's Sc-Scared?!
Volume 1: A Party with Pikachu	Bonus 3	ハッピーパーティ	Party Time!
Volume 1: A Party with Pikachu	Special 1		Pokémon File!
Volume 1: A Party with Pikachu	Special 2		Yumi Tskirino How to be a Pokémon Master!!
Volume 1: A Party with Pikachu	Special 3		I got Pokémon!!
Volume 2: Pokémon Matchmakers	7	めざせ！冒険の石!!	Adventuring The Stone
Volume 2: Pokémon Matchmakers	8	伝説のポケモン フリーザー!	The Legendary Articuno
Volume 2: Pokémon Matchmakers	9	天才ポケモン イーブイくん	Eevee... Pokémon Genius!
Volume 2: Pokémon Matchmakers	10	お花見で大パニック!!	Panic At The Cherry Blossom Festival!!
Volume 2: Pokémon Matchmakers	11	ヒトカゲくんとピースくん	Charmander's Peanut
Volume 2: Pokémon Matchmakers	12	アーボックの初恋物語	Even An Arbok Falls In Love!
Volume 2: Pokémon Matchmakers	Bonus 4	温泉でドッキドキ!?	Excitement at the Hot Springs!?
Volume 2: Pokémon Matchmakers	Bonus 5	バレンタインでドッキドキ	Valentine Heartbeats
Volume 3: Abra and Kadabra Magic	13	メタモン師匠とウォールくん	The Wal Comes Tumbling Down
Volume 3: Abra and Kadabra Magic	14	これからもよろしくネ	Forever Friends
Volume 3: Abra and Kadabra Magic	15	命がけの観察日記	A Quest Of Life Or Death
Volume 3: Abra and Kadabra Magic	16	たのしいイモ掘り大会	Fun At The Potato Dig
Volume 3: Abra and Kadabra Magic	17	イーブイくんの大ヘンな一日	Eevee In A Jam
Volume 3: Abra and Kadabra Magic	18	素敵なクリスマスプレゼント	The Best Gift Ever
Volume 3: Abra and Kadabra Magic	Bonus 6	さがしものでドッキドキ!?	The Heart's Search
Volume 3: Abra and Kadabra Magic	Bonus 7	なぜなぜ？コダックくん	Why, Psyduck, Why?
Volume 4: Friends and Families	19	ゼニガメ5人姉妹参上	The Five Sisters of Squirtle
Volume 4: Friends and Families	20	ラブラブ ダネリーナ	Green-Eyed Bulbasaur
Volume 4: Friends and Families	21	ホレぐすりを追いかけろ！	Follow that Love Potion!
Volume 4: Friends and Families	22	ピジョー&ピジョコの恋物語	Pidgeot Loves Pidgetta
Volume 4: Friends and Families	23	マロン大ピンチ!!	Hazel's Big Adventure!
Volume 4: Friends and Families	24	ヒトカゲくんのたいくつな1日	Charmander's Boring, Boring Day
Volume 4: Friends and Families	Bonus 8	かくれんぼでドッキドキ!?	The Unbearable Suspense of Hide-and-Seek!
Volume 4: Friends and Families	Bonus 9	怪談でドッキドキ!!!!	The Unbearable Suspense of... THE GHOSTSTORY!!! (BOO!)
Volume 4: Friends and Families	Special	ポケモンゲットだぜー!!	Let's Catch Some Pokémon!
Volume 4: Friends and Families	Special	ウォールのプレゼント	Wal's Present
Volume 5: Going Coconuts	25	ひとりぼっちのナゾノクサ	Odd Oddish Out
Volume 5: Going Coconuts	26	キンチョ〜の初デート	The Terror of... the First Date!
Volume 5: Going Coconuts	27	アーモンドのホントのきもち？	Hypnotism
Volume 5: Going Coconuts	28	ピッピ・ウォールの大特訓	Wal of Power
Volume 5: Going Coconuts	29	ダイエットするでちゅ！	Never Say Diet!
Volume 5: Going Coconuts	30	マロンのメリークリスマス	Hazel's Holiday
Volume 5: Going Coconuts	Bonus 10	恋のドッキドキ大作戦!!	The Master Plan... for Romance!
Volume 5: Going Coconuts	Bonus 11	コイキングの魔法でキレイになるっ!?	Magikarp Journey
Volume 5: Going Coconuts	Bonus 12	ピカチュウのさかなつり!?	Gone Fishing!?
Volume 6: Gold & Silver	31	るーちゃんがんばって!	Eevee-Lu-Tion
Volume 6: Gold & Silver	32	メタモンくんの変身試験	The Ditto Test
Volume 6: Gold & Silver	33	ふしぎなたまご	Eggcellent Togepi
Volume 6: Gold & Silver	34	トゲピー大パニック!	The Great Togepi Disaster
Volume 6: Gold & Silver	35	大好きなクコママヘ	PokéMom
Volume 6: Gold & Silver	36	恋する少女♥チコ登場	Almond love is Hazel
Volume 6: Gold & Silver	Bonus 13	恐怖のうらないでドッキドキ!?	The Terrible Omen
Volume 6: Gold & Silver	Bonus 14	一番の友達	Raichu's Best Friend
Volume 6: Gold & Silver	Bonus 15	すき？きらい？	Loves Me? Loves Me Not?
Volume 7: From the Heart	37	なぞの美少女·ジンジャー登場	The Mysterious Beauty
Volume 7: From the Heart	38		Swimming with the Qwilfish
Volume 7: From the Heart	39		The Very First Date
Volume 7: From the Heart	40		Heavenly Pokémon
Volume 7: From the Heart	41		Clefairy's Blue Period
Volume 7: From the Heart	42		Rock-a-Bye Pokémon (Part 1)
Volume 7: From the Heart	43		Rock-a-Bye Pokémon (Part 2)
Volume 7: From the Heart	Bonus 16	1本星の丘で...	The Hill of the Lone Star Tree
Volume 7: From the Heart	Bonus 17	プリンちゃんのでドッキドキ	Jigglypuff's Joy

== Reception ==
Jason Thompson rated the series two and one half out of four stars, arguing that it is "curious but enjoyable" with "cute and clean" stick figure artwork and jokes that "are funnier than the material demands".

== See also ==
- Pokémon (manga)
- Pokémon Adventures
