= Masako =

- Gender: Female

Origin
- Origin: Japanese
- Meaning: Different meanings depending on the kanji used

Masako (written: 雅子, 正子, 真沙子, 真子 or まさこ in hiragana) is a feminine Japanese given name. Notable people with the name include:

- Empress Masako of Japan (雅子皇后)
- Princess Masako (恒久王妃昌子内親王), (1888–1940), 6th daughter of Emperor Meiji
- Masako Asada (浅田 雅子; born 1971), Japanese diver
- Masako Bandō (坂東 眞砂子; 1958–2014), Japanese novelist
- Masako Chiba (千葉 真子; born 1976), Japanese long-distance runner
- Masako Doi (土井 雅子; born 1995), Japanese judoka
- Masako Ebisu (恵比寿 まさ子; born 1945), Japanese voice actress
- Masako Eguchi (江口 正登; born 1949), Japanese luger
- Masako Furuichi (古市 雅子; born 1996), Japanese freestyle wrestler
- Masako Ganaha (我那覇 真子; born 1989), Japanese freelance journalist and JSDF reservist
- Masako Hachisuka (蜂須賀 正子; born 1941), Japanese linguist
- Masako Hayashi (林 雅子; 1928–2001), Japanese architect
- Hōjō Masako (北条 政子; 1156–1225), later known as the "Nun Shogun"
- Masako Hozumi (穂積 雅子; born 1986), Japanese speed skater
- Masako Ikeda (池田 昌子; born 1939), Japanese voice actress
- Masako Imai (今井 雅子; born 1967), Japanese windsurfer
- Masako Ishida (石田 正子; born 1980), Japanese cross-country skier
- Masako Izumi (和泉 雅子; 1947–2025), Japanese actress, singer and adventurer
- Masako Jō (城 雅子; born 1978), Japanese voice actress
- Masako Kato (加藤 雅子; born 1965), Japanese figure skater
- Masako Katsuki (勝生 真沙子; born 1958), Japanese voice actress
- Masako Katsura (桂 マサ子; 1913–1995), Japanese carom billiards player
- Masako Kisaki (木崎 正子; born 1943), Japanese middle-distance runner
- Masako Kondo (近藤 雅子; born 1941), Japanese volleyball player
- Minamoto Masako (源 晶子), (1552–1589), posthumous name of Lady Saigō, first consort of Tokugawa Ieyasu
- Masako Miura (三浦 雅子; born 1959), Japanese voice actress
- Masako Miwada (三輪田 真佐子; 1943–1927), Japanese educator and writer
- Masako Mori (politician) (森 まさこ; born 1964), Japanese politician
- Masako Mori (singer) (森 昌子; born 1958), Japanese enka singer and former 1970s idol
- Masako Mori (writer) (森 真沙子; born 1944), Japanese novelist
- Masako Morishita, Japanese executive chef
- Masako Nakata (中田 正子; 1910–2002), Japanese lawyer
- Princess Nashimoto Masako of Japan (梨本宮方子女王), later Crown Princess Bangja of Korea
- Masako Natsume (夏目 雅子; 1957–1985), Japanese actress
- Masako Nozawa (野沢 雅子; born 1936), Japanese voice actress
- Masako Ogawa (小川 正子; 1902–1943), Japanese medical doctor
- Masako Okawara (大河原 雅子; born 1953), Japanese politician
- Masako Okōchi (大河内 雅子; born 1983), Japanese voice actress
- Masako Ono (小野 雅子; born 1972), Japanese Odissi dancer
- Masako Sakamoto (阪本 雅子; born 1972), Japanese badminton player
- Masako Sato (field hockey) (佐藤 雅子; born 1987), Japanese field hockey player
- Masako Sato (ice hockey) (佐藤 雅子; born 1973), Japanese ice hockey player
- Masako Seki (関 正子; 1941/1942–2019), Japanese table tennis player
- Masako Sen (千 容子), former princess of Japan and daughter of Prince Mikasa
- Masako Shinpo (真保 正子; 1913–1995), Japanese track and field athlete
- Masako Shirasu (白洲 正子; 1910–1998), Japanese author and collector of fine arts
- Masako Sugaya (菅谷 政子; 1937–2021), Japanese voice actress
- Masako Tachibana (橘 雅子; born 1983), Japanese synchronized swimmer
- Masako Togawa (戸川 昌子; 1931–2016), Japanese Chanson singer/songwriter, actress, feminist and novelist
- Tokugawa Masako (徳川 和子), 5th daughter of Tokugawa Hidetada, the 2nd Tokugawa Shogun
- Masako Usui (笛吹 雅子; born 1968), Japanese announcer
- Masako Wada (和田 征子; born 1943), Japanese hibakusha as a survivor of the 1945 atomic bombing of Nagasaki
- Masako Watanabe (わたなべ まさこ; born 1928), Japanese manga artist
- Masako Watanabe (softball) (渡辺 正子; born 1971), Japanese softball player
- Masako Yanagi (柳 昌子; born 1959), Japanese former women's singles tennis and doubles tennis player
- Masako Yashiro (矢代 まさこ; born 1947), Japanese manga artist

== Fictional characters ==
- Masako Kaneko
- Colonel Masako, main antagonist in the video-game Red Faction
- Lady Masako Adachi, a character in the video-game Ghost of Tsushima
- Masako Garmadon, a character from LEGO Ninjago series

== See also ==
- MasakoX, Internet personality and voice actor
