= Cinnamoroll =

Character series created by Sanrio

- Cover of the first English volume of Fluffy, Fluffy Cinnamoroll released by Viz Media, featuring Cinnamoroll (left) and Milk (right).

シナモロール (Shinamorōru)
- Genre: Adventure; Fantasy
- Manga

Fluffy, Fluffy Cinnamoroll
- Written by: Yumi Tsukirino; Chisato Seki
- Illustrated by: Yumi Tsukirino
- Published by: Shogakukan
- English publisher: NA: Viz Media
- Magazine: Pucchigumi
- Original run: November 2004 – August 2007
- Volumes: 5
- Anime film

Cinnamon the Movie
- Directed by: Gisaburō Sugii
- Written by: Mari Okada
- Studio: Madhouse Studios; Shochiku
- Released: December 22, 2007
- Runtime: 44 minutes
- Original net animation

Cinnamon no Parade
- Directed by: masatakaP
- Studio: Sanrio
- Released: June 21, 2012
- Novel

Cinnamoroll: Cinnamon's Wonderland Trip
- Written by: Utako Yoshino
- Illustrated by: Yuki Kiriga
- Published by: Kadokawa Shoten
- Imprint: Tsubasa Bunko
- Published: September 15, 2014

Cinnamoroll (Japanese: シナモロール, Hepburn: Shinamorōru) is a multimedia character franchise created by Sanrio in 2001, with characters designed by Miyuki Okumura. It focuses on the titular character, a male dog named Cinnamoroll. He appears in his own manga series, one anime film, and various short animated series. Cinnamoroll's friends include Milk, Mocha, and Chiffon.

The franchise began with a manga that expanded into two official side stories: Cinnamoangels (シナモエンジェルス, Shinamoenjerusu) in 2005, which focuses on Azuki, Mocha, and Chiffon, and Lloromannic (ルロロマニック, Ruroromanikku) in 2007, which focuses on both Berry and Cherry.

== Story ==
Cinnamoroll is a white dog who lives at Café Cinnamon. He is friends with Chiffon, Mocha, Espresso, Cappuccino and Milk over there. He fell out of the sky when wandering on the clouds and landed near Cafe Cinnamon. Chowder saw him and Ms. Anna picked Cinnamoroll up. Ms. Anna then introduced him to his new friends, Chiffon, Mocha, Espresso, Cappuccino, and Milk. Cinnamoroll is sometimes depicted as running the Cafe.

== Characters ==
Cinnamoroll (シナモロール, Shinamorōru)
Cinnamoroll is a male white dog with long ears that enable him to fly. He has blue eyes, pink cheeks, and a tail that resembles a cinnamon roll.
Cappuccino (カプチーノ, Kapuchīno)
Voiced by: Rei Sakuma
Cappuccino is a male dog living in the house with the red roof across the street from Café Cinnamon. He has a laid-back demeanor, a hearty appetite, and takes long naps. Cappuccino is easy to recognize by his mouth, reminiscent of a steaming cup of cappuccino, and likes eating, but his favorite thing is napping. He is the glutton of the bunch and very chubby. He also loves bug catching which is his favorite activity. In 2007, with the introduction of Coco and Nuts, Cappuccino became their protective older brother.
Chiffon (シフォン, Shifon)
Voiced by: Ikue Ōtani
Chiffon is a female dog living near a lush, green park. The most energetic of the pups, she inspires her friends and does not sweat the small stuff. Her ears, which are fluffy like a chiffon cake, are her standout feature. Chiffon is also a tomboy as she normally plays tennis, but has a sensitive side when it comes to animals. Together with Mocha and Azuki, Chiffon make up the three-girl idol group Cinnamonangels and wears a stylish hat.
Espresso (エスプレッソ, Esupuresso)
Voiced by: Ryoko Shiraishi
Espresso is a male cream-colored dog living near the park in the biggest house around. He is depicted as an artistic and rich dog.
Mocha (モカ, Moka)
Voiced by: Yumi Kakazu
Mocha is a female brown dog living in a white house on top of a hill. She is a stylish chatterbox who acts like the big sister of the bunch and is always looking out for others. In the manga, her fur color is light brown and she is seen wearing different hair accessories besides her pink flowers. Alongside Chiffon and Azuki, they make up the three-girl idol group Cinnamonangels and the leader of the group.
In 2025, Mocha gains a resurge in popularity, causing Sanrio to give her the full character name "Lovelymocha" later that year. In 2026, she was among the 12 Sanrio characters to chosen by the company to get marketed towards Western audiences.
Milk (みるく, Miruku)
Voiced by: Ikue Ōtani
The youngest character in the series, Milk is a baby male pup living close to the park in a house with a chimney. He likes being cuddled and will cry if he does not have his favorite pacifier. Milk cannot speak, so the only phrase he consistently expresses is "Ba-Boo".
Cornet (コルネ, Korune)
Cornet is a unicorn kid who lives in the sky above the clouds. He has a light blue coat, a pink mane, and a tail and his horn is shaped like an ice cream cone. In a 2017 interview for Cinnamoroll's 15th Anniversary, Miyuki Okumura revealed that Cornet was inspired by Unico created by Osamu Tezuka and Kiki and Lala's Unicorn.
Coco (ココ, Koko)
Coco is a male puppy who wears a red scarf around his neck. He and his twin brother Nuts was rescued by Cinnamoroll when a white stork got shocked by lightning during a thunderstorm, causing the bag to fall from its beak. Cinnamoroll quickly flew down to catch the bag that the stork was carrying. By the time Cinnamoroll landed on the ground, he opened the bag to reveal that two newborn puppies were inside. Cinnamoroll carried Coco and Nuts to Café Cinnamon to give them a new home.
Nuts (ナッツ, Nattsu)
Nuts is a male puppy who wears a blue scarf around his neck. He is more curious than his brother Coco and often seen sleeping.
Poron (ポロン)
Poron is a female light pink dog who wears a puffy light blue bow on her head and owns a time compass that helps her on her journey with Cinnamon. She is her third female friend of Cinnamoroll. She is a time traveler, and one given day, she dropped out of the sky on Cinnamoroll's fluffy head. They became friends and go on adventures with Cornet. She was first introduced on Cinnamoroll's Japanese Twitter account, in April 2014. Her body is fluffy like clouds and her tail also resembles an angel wing. She also makes occasional appearances on the official Cinnamoroll X account.
Azuki (アズキ)
Voiced by: Masako Okōchi
Azuki is a female dog who dreams to become an idol. She is lady-like, but sometimes a little bit off in terms of personality. Azuki is in charge of the Cinnamonangels' manners and fortune-telling. She also practices calligraphy and flower arrangement to become a true Japanese lady.
Berry (べリー, Berī)
Voiced by: Kōki Miyata (Onegai My Melody Kirara)
Berry is a male demon with ram horns and black bat wings who is talented at making potions. Both Berry and Cherry would go through their magic mirror to enter into the human world to play tricks on children while they sleep. The duo is afraid of daytime and would hide in the closet or drawers if they do not make it home in time until night returns. Berry and Cherry serve as a narrator in the anime Onegai My Melody Kirara.
Cherry (チェリー, Cherī)
Voiced by: Fujiko Takimoto (Onegai My Melody Kirara)
Cherry is a female demon and Berry's partner-in-crime who was created when Berry accidentally used a jar of salt. As Cherry transforms into her devilish form, her light-black closed bat wing ears change into dark-black opened bat wings, her black eyes into fandango eyes, her top hat disappears, her teeth into fangs, and her voice changes. Cherry and Berry serve as a narrators in the anime Onegai My Melody Kirara.
Anna (アンナ)
Voiced by: Satomi Ishihara
Anna is a human girl who owns the Café Cinnamon. Before 2005, she was mostly unseen and only mentioned in Cinnamon's character biography.
Chowder (チャウダー, Chaudā)
Voiced by: Tomonori Jinnai
Chowder is the main antagonist exclusive to Cinnamon The Movie that lives in a forest close to the Café.

== Media ==
In March 2023, Sanrio opened a YouTube channel for Cinnamoroll which streams a short anime titled Cinnamon Anime Damon (シナモンアニメだもん, Shinamon Anime Damon). New episodes were broadcast each Friday. From September 13 of the same year, the English version of the anime began to be distributed on Sanrio's official US YouTube channel, Hello Kitty and Friends. The show concluded on March 6, 2025, with 123 numbered episodes and several unnumbered ones, but it returned with new episodes in September via Sanrio's channel.

In June 2023, two anime series were announced. A short series titled I. Cinnamoroll began streaming on the Cinnamoroll YouTube channel in October 2023, and a cooking television series featuring actor Ken Yasuda, titled Cinnamon to Yasuda Ken no Yurudoki Sūbun Cooking, it premiered on TBS Television October 7, 2023. Around 2024–2025, I. Cinnamoroll was moved to the Hello Kitty and Friends YouTube channel, with new episodes releasing every Friday at 1PM pacific standard time.

Cinnamoroll also had a brief collaboration with Sky: Children of the Light, made by Thatgamecompany, where he opened his café for players. In February 2026, Cinnamoroll appeared as a skin for the character Kiriko in Overwatch as a collaboration with Sanrio.

=== Manga ===
A five-volume manga was written by Chisato Seki and illustrated by Yumi Tsukirino. It was published in Japan from 2004 to 2007 by Shogakukan and serialized in the monthly magazine Pucchigumi. In 2008, three special volumes of the manga titled Color Edition: Fluffy, Fluffy Cinnamoroll (カラー版 ふわふわ♥シナモン, Karāban Fuwa-fuwa Shinamon) contained colorful pages for each manga alongside brand-new stories. From 2005 to 2008, a spin-off manga that focused on The Cinnamoangels titled Puri Kawa Cinnamoangels!! (プリ☆かわ☆シナモンエンジェルス!!, Puri Kawa Shinamon Enjerusu!!) released, focusing on Mocha, Chiffon, and Azuki doing various activities and trying to attract boys. Viz Media started translating the manga in 2011, which was released to English-speaking countries in 2012.

=== Merchandising ===
Cinnamoroll merchandise includes Build-a-Bear plush toys, Converse shoes, and crossover merchandise with Hikaru Midorikawa.

=== Music ===
Cinnamon was featured in a music video with the Japanese rock girl band Scandal. In June 2012, Sanrio teamed up with MasatakaP to create an animated video coinciding the character's 10th Anniversary using the MikuMikuDance (MMD) software. The video is handled by MastakaP for the animation while Intetsu, the Bassist of the band Ayabie handles the music. A downloadable version of Cinnamon for use with MMD software was available by Sanrio until August 31, 2012. In October 2012, Vocaloid producer OSTER project announced an album called Cinnamon Trip!!, which was released in Japan on December 12, 2012. There are 9 songs in the album, each sung by Cinnamoroll and his friends including the Cinnamoangels and Lloromannic. Each song has its own theme, such as Mocha's song "Petit Paris" which takes place in Paris, France, and "Hawaiian Angels" which takes place in Hawaii and is sung by the Cinnamoangels. All of the tracks except three were included in a musical in the Wisdom Tree Stage in Sanrio Puroland starring Cinnamoroll, Mocha, Cappuccino and Chiffon.

== Reception ==
Cinnamoroll was the second most successful Sanrio character in 2005, after Hello Kitty. The popularity of Cinnamoroll and minor characters kicked off in 2005 with a "spin-off series" called The Cinnamoangels which features Cinnamoroll's friend Mocha, Chiffon, and Azuki. In 2011, Cinnamoroll got his own blog on the Japanese blogging and social networking website Ameba. In 2012, wanting to Cinnamoroll's 10th Anniversary Tokyo's Haneda Airport had a Cinnamoroll showcase showing fan-taken photos and some original Cinnamoroll pictures.

In 2015, Cinnamoroll's official Twitter account experienced cyberbullying because it thought Cinnamoroll would never get angry. A group of Twitter users started responding to the account's tweets with offensive comments regarding the character in March 2015, and the disruption worsened in May. On May 11, a tweet from the official Twitter saying: "Chiffon: "Good morning! Cinnamon doesn't want to come all the way out this morning, so I've come out instead. I will protect Cinnamon, so I hope all his friends will look after him too." was posted, referring to the continuous bullying due to haters. In response, Sanrio blocked the culprits.

Cinnamoroll was voted the most popular Sanrio character in the Sanrio Character Rankings from 2017–2018, and again from 2020–2024.
