= List of Pokémon manga =

There are various Pokémon manga series, based on the Pokémon anime, video games, and trading card game. By 2000, the Pokémon manga series had sold over 7.25 million tankōbon volumes in the United States, including 1.001 million copies of Pokémon: The Electric Tale of Pikachu volume 1, which is one of the best-selling single comic books in the United States since 1993.

== Released in English ==
=== Manga released by Viz Media, Shogakukan Asia, and Chuang Yi ===
Title	Creator(s)	First issue	Last issue	Fully serialized?
Pokémon Adventures ポケットモンスターSpecial (Poketto Monsutā Special)	Hidenori Kusaka; Mato, Satoshi Yamamoto	March 1997	ongoing	No

=== Manga released by Viz and Chuang Yi ===
Title	Creator(s)	First issue	Last issue	Fully serialized?
Pokémon: The Electric Tale of Pikachu ポケットモンスター・電撃ピカチュウ (Poketto Monsutā: Dengeki Pikachū)	Toshihiro Ono	April 1997	December 1999	Yes
Magical Pokémon Journey ポケットモンスター PiPiPi★アドベンチャー (Poketto Monsutā: PiPiPi Adobenchā)	Yumi Tsukirino	July 1997	February 2003	Yes
Pokémon Diamond and Pearl Adventure! ポケットモンスターダイヤモンド・パール物語 ポケモンD・P (Poketto Monsutā Daiyamondo Pāru Monogatari: Pokemon D-P)	Shigekatsu Ihara	February 27, 2007	October 28, 2009	Yes
Pokémon Ranger and the Temple of the Sea ポケモンレンジャーと蒼海の王子 マナフィ (Pokemon Renjā to Umi no Ōji Manafi)	Makoto Mizobuchi	May 2006	July 2006	Yes
Pokémon: The Rise of Darkrai ディアルガVSパルキアVSダークライ (Diaruga vs. Parukia vs. Dākurai)	Ryo Takamisaki	May 15, 2007	July 14, 2007	Yes
Pokémon: Giratina and the Sky Warrior ギラティナと氷空の花束 シェイミ (Giratina to Sora no Hanataba Sheimi)	Makoto Hijioka	April 15, 2008	June 13, 2008	Yes
Pokémon: Arceus and the Jewel of Life アルセウス 超克の時空へ (Aruseusu Chōkoku no Jikū e)	Makoto Mizobuchi	May 15, 2009	July 18, 2009	Yes
Pokémon: Zoroark: Master of Illusions 幻影の覇者ゾロアーク (Gen'ei no Hasha: Zoroāku)	Momota Inoue	May 15, 2010	July 15, 2010	Yes
Pokémon the Movie: White—Victini and Zekrom ビクティニと黒き英雄ゼクロム (Bikutini to Kuroki Eiyū Zekuromu)	Momota Inoue	April 15, 2011	June 15, 2011	Yes

=== Manga released by Viz and Shogakukan Asia ===
Title	Creator(s)	First issue	Last issue	Fully serialized?
Pokémon the Movie: Kyurem vs. the Sword of Justice キュレムVS聖剣士ケルディオ (Kyuremu vs. Seikenshi Kerudio)	Momota Inoue	June 15, 2012	August 28, 2012	Yes
Pokémon the Movie: Genesect and the Legend Awakened 神速のゲノセクト ミュウツー覚醒 (Shinsoku no Genosekuto: Myūtsū Kakusei)	Momota Inoue	April 15, 2013	July 13, 2013	Yes
Pokémon the Movie: Diancie and the Cocoon of Destruction 破壊の繭とディアンシー (Hakai no Mayu to Dianshī)	Kenji Kitamura	May 15, 2014	July 19, 2014	Yes
Pokémon the Movie: Volcanion and the Mechanical Marvel ボルケニオンと機巧のマギアナ (Borukenion to Karakuri no Magiana)	Kemon Kawamoto	March 15, 2016	July 16, 2016	Yes

=== Manga released by Viz ===
Title	Creator(s)	First issue	Last issue	Fully serialized?
Pokémon Mystery Dungeon: Ginji's Rescue Team ポケモン不思議のダンジョンギンジの救助隊 (Pokemon Fushigi no Danjon: Ginji no Kyūjotai)	Makoto Mizobuchi	September 2005	February 2006	Yes
Pokémon the Movie: Hoopa and the Clash of Ages 光輪の超魔神 フーパ (Ringu no Chōmajin Fūpa)	Gin Kamimura	May 15, 2015	July 18, 2015	Yes
Pokémon Horizon ポケットモンスター ホライズン (Poketto Monsutā Horaizun)	Tenya Yabuno	February 28, 2017	August 28, 2017	Yes

- Pokémon Pocket Comics: Black & White
- Pokémon Pocket Comics: Legendary Pokémon
- Pokémon Pocket Comics: XY

The Pokemon Comic Strip, made by Gerard Jones, who did the writing, and Ashura Benimaru, who did the artwork, was released for U.S. audiences. It was made because licensors determined that they could not provide a proper adaptation of the Japanese comic strip to U.S. audiences. It was released in the collection Pikachu Meets the Press.

=== Manga released by Chuang Yi ===
Title	Creator(s)	First issue	Last issue	Fully serialized?
Pokémon Pocket Monsters ポケットモンスター (Poketto Monsutā)	Kosaku Anakubo	November 1996	April 28, 2003	Yes
Pokémon Yeah! I Got Pokémon! ポケモンゲットだぜ! (Pokemon Getto Da Ze!)	Miho Asada	March 1999	September 2001	Yes
Pokémon Gold & Silver: The Golden Boys ポケットモンスターゴールド・シルバー ゴールデン・ボーイズ (Poketto Monsutā Gōrudo Shirubā: Gōruden Bōizu)	Muneo Saitō	November 1999	September 2001	Yes
Ash and Pikachu サトシとピカチュウ (Satoshi to Pikachu)	Takashi Teshirogi	February 26, 2001	February 27, 2006	Yes
Pokémon: Jirachi—Wish Maker 七夜の願い星 ジラーチ (Nanayo no Negaiboshi Jirāchi)	Oouchi Suigun	May 2003	July 19, 2003	Yes
Pokémon Ruby-Sapphire ポケットモンスター R・S (Poketto Monsutā RS)	Kosaku Anakubo	September 25, 2003	May 26, 2006	Yes
Pokémon: Destiny Deoxys 裂空の訪問者 デオキシス (Rekkū no Hōmonsha Deokishisu)	Takashi Teshirogi	June 2004	July 17, 2004	Yes
Pocket Monsters Emerald: Challenge! Battle Frontier ポケットモンスターエメラルド 挑戦！！バトルフロンティア (Poketto Monsutā Emerarudo: Chōsen!! Batoru Furontia)	Shigekatsu Ihara	October 2004	June 24, 2005	Yes
Pokémon: Lucario and the Mystery of Mew ミュウと波導の勇者 ルカリオ (Myū to Hadō no Yūsha Rukario)	Shigekatsu Ihara	2005	July 16, 2005	Yes
Phantom Thief Pokémon 7 快盗!ポケモン7 (Kaitō! Pokemon 7)	Shigekatsu Ihara	2008	2008	No

=== Manga released by Shogakukan Asia ===
Title	Creator(s)	First issue	Last issue	Fully serialized?
Be the Best! Pokémon B-W 究めろ！ポケモンB・W (Kiwamero! Pokemon BW)	Naoto Katsumi	October 2010	August 26, 2011	Yes

== Manga not released in English ==
Title	Creator(s)	First issue	Last issue	Fully serialized?
Pocket Monsters Zensho ポケットモンスター全書 (Poketto Monsutā Zensho)	Satomi Nakamura	April 1998	April 1998	Yes
Pocket Monsters Diamond-Pearl ポケットモンスター D・P (Poketto Monsutā DP)	Kosaku Anakubo	June 2006	October 2008	Yes
Pokémon Mystery Dungeon: Blazing Exploration Team ポケモン不思議のダンジョン 炎の探検隊 (Pokemon Fushigi no Danjon: En no Tankentai)	Makoto Mizobuchi	August 28, 2008	August 28, 2008	Yes
Pokémon Battrio: Aim to be Battrio Master! ポケモンバトリオ めざせ! バトリオマスター (Pokemon Batorio: Mezase! Batorio Masutā)	Takashi Teshirogi	2008	September 28, 2010	Yes
Pocket Monsters HGSS: Jō's Big Adventure ポケットモンスター HGSS ジョウの大冒険 (Poketto Monsutā HGSS: Jō no Daibōken)	Ryū Matsushima	April 28, 2010	April 28, 2010	Yes
Pocket Monsters HGSS ポケットモンスター HG・SS (Poketto Monsutā HGSS)	Kosaku Anakubo	June 28, 2010	January 28, 2011	Yes
Pocket Monsters Black-White ポケットモンスター B・W (Poketto Monsutā BW)	Kosaku Anakubo	August 26, 2011	August 28, 2013	Yes
Pocket Monsters BW: The Heroes of Fire and Thunder ポケットモンスター B・W 炎雷の英雄 (Poketto Monsutā BW: Honō Kaminari no Eiyū)	Satoshi Kanda	February 2011	October 2011	Yes
Pocket Monsters B2 W2: A New Legend ポケットモンスター B2・W2: 新たなる伝説~ (Poketto Monsutā B2W2: Aratanaru Densetsu)	Satoshi Kanda	June 2012	October 2012	Yes
Pocket Monsters BW: Good Partners ポケットモンスターB・W グッドパートナーズ (Poketto Monsutā BW: Guddo Pātonāzu)	Kyouichi Shichigatsu; Chiyo Kenmotsu	July 26, 2013	July 26, 2013	Yes
Pocket Monsters XY ポケットモンスター エックス・ワイ (Poketto Monsutā Ekkusu-Wai)	Kosaku Anakubo	April 28, 2014	October 28, 2016	Yes
Pokémon Omega Ruby: Crimson Passion/Pokémon Alpha Sapphire: Indigo Wisdom ポケモンオメガルビー紅き情熱・ポケモンアルファサファイア藍き英知 (Pokemon Omega Rubī: Akaki Jōnetsu/Pokemon Arufa Safaia: Aiki Eichi)	Hatha Shingo	November 2014	December 2014	Yes
Pocket Monsters Sun Moon ポケットモンスター サン・ムーン (Poketto Monsutā San-Mūn)	Kosaku Anakubo	November 28, 2017	2020	Yes
Pokémon Horizons	Kei Yamadaka	April 14, 2023	Ongoing	No
Pokémon Horizons: Liko's Treasure ポケットモンスター ～リコの宝物～ (Pocket Monster: Riko no Takaramono)	Kahori Orito	May 2, 2023	Ongoing	No

- How I Became a Pokémon Card (ポケモンカードになったワケ, Pokemon Kādo ni Natta Wake) by Kagemaru Himeno, an artist for the TCG. There are six volumes and each includes a special promotional card. The stories tell the tales of the art behind some of Himeno's cards.
- Mezase!! Card Master (Japanese: めざせ！！ カードマスター Aim to Be a Card Master) is a one-volume manga series drawn by Interu.
- Pokémon 4Koma Gag Battle (ポケットモンスター 4コマギャグバトル, Pokémon 4Koma Gyagu Battoru) from Kobunsha Publishing Co.
- Pokémon 4Koma Ōhyakka (ポケモン4コマ大百科; Pokémon 4Koma Encyclopedia)
- Pokémon 4Koma Ōhyakka Kin Gin (ポケモン4コマ大百科 金・銀; Pokémon 4Koma Encyclopedia: Gold and Silver), a one-volume Pokémon manga based on Pokémon Gold and Silver created by Takahiro Yamashita.
- Pokémon Diamond/Pearl 4Koma Theatre by Ryuu Matsushita
- Pocket Monsters Platinum: Aim to Be Battle King!! (ポケットモンスタープラチナ めざせ!! バトル王, Poketto Monsutā Purachina: Mezase!! Batoru-ō) by Ryū Matsushima.
- Pocket Monsters Chamo-Chamo Pretty by Yumi Tsukirino, a spin-off and sequel to Magical Pokémon Journey.
- Pokémon Tri-adventure (ポケモントライアドベンチャー, Pokemon Torai-adobenchā) was released on June 28, 2010.
- Pocket Monsters RéBurst (ポケットモンスターRéBURST), currently serialized in Weekly Shōnen Sunday.
- Pokémon Quiz Puzzle Land Pikachu wa Meitantei (ポケモンクイズパズルランド ピカチュウは名たんてい, Pokemon Kuizu Pazuru: Pikachu wa Meitantei; Pokémon Quiz Puzzle Land Pikachu is a Detective) by Hiroshi Seto and Yumiko Sudo, a manga which uses puzzles as a method of storytelling.
- Pokémon: The Legend of the Dragon King (ポケモン竜王伝, Pokemon: yūō-den) by Takashi Ishii.

=== Manga not collected in tankōbon format ===
Title	Creator(s)	First issue	Last issue
Pokémon Colosseum: Snatcher Leo ポケモンコロシアム スナッチャーレオ (Pokemon Koroshiamu: Sunatchā Reo)	Oouchi Suigun	January 2003	March 2003
Pokémon Colosseum: Snatchers ポケモンコロシアム スナッチャーズ (Pokemon Koroshiamu: Sunatchāzu)	Oouchi Suigun	December 2003	February 2004
Pokémon Ranger: The 1st Mission- ポケモンレンジャー －The 1st ミッション－	Shigekatsu Ihara	April 2006	April 2006
Mobilize!! Pokémon Ranger 出動！！ポケモンレンジャー (Shutsudō!! Pokemon Renjā)	Miho Asada	April 2006	March 2007
W Mission Story: Pokémon Ranger - the Comic; W ミッションストーリ ポケモンレンジャー the Comic	Hidenori Kusaka; Satoshi Yamamoto	April 3, 2006	June 30, 2006
Pocket Monsters Diamond/Pocket Monsters Pearl ポケットモンスターダイヤモンド ポケットモンスターパール (Poketto Monsutā Daiyamondo/Poketto Monsutā Pāru)		November 2006	November 2006
Pokémon Ranger: The Road to a "Capture" Master ポケモンレンジャー「キャプチャ」マスターへの道 (Pokemon Renjā: "Kyapucha" Masutā e no Michi)	Emiko Yoshino	April 2008	June 2008
Pokémon Ranger Vatonage: The Road to Top Ranger ポケモンレンジャー バトナージ～トップレンジャーへの道～ (Pokemon Renjā Batonāji: Toppu Renjā e no Michi)	Ryū Matsushima	April 2008	June 2008
Pokémon Ranger Vatonage: Mission Clear Manga ポケモンレンジャーバトナジ まんがでミッションクリア (Pokemon Renjā Batonaji: Manga de Misshon Kuria)	Emiko Yoshino	April 2008	August 2008
Darkrai Mission Story: Pokémon Ranger Vatonage - the Comic ダークライ ミッションストーリー ポケモンレンジャー バトナージ - the Comic	Hidenori Kusaka; Satoshi Yamamoto	March 21, 2008	May 2008
Pocket Monsters HeartGold SoulSilver: Go! Go! Pokéathlon ポケットモンスターハートゴールドソウルシルバーGO! GO! ポケスロン (Poketto Monsutā Hātogōrudo Souru Shirubā: Go! Go! Pokesuron)	Shigekatsu Ihara		?
Pocket Monsters BW: Meetings with the Legends ポケットモンスターB・W 伝説との遭遇 (Poketto Monsutā BW: Densetsu to no Sōgū)	Momota Inoue	2010	2010
Pokémon Super Mystery Dungeon: Go For It! Novice Investigation Team! ポケモン超不思議のダンジョンそれいけ！新米調査団 (Pokemon Chō Fushigi no Danjon: Soreike! Shinmai Chōsadan)	Keisui Takaeda	October 2015	October 2015

- Pokémon: The First Movie (ミュウツーの逆襲, Myuutsū no Gyakushū; Mewtwo Strikes Back)
- Pokémon: The Movie 2000 (The Power of One) (幻のポケモン ルギア爆誕, Maboroshi no Pokemon: Rugia Bakutan; Mirage Pokémon: Lugia's Explosive Birth)
- Pokémon 3: The Movie (Spell of the Unown) (結晶塔の帝王 Entei, Kesshō-Tō no teiō: Entei; Emperor of the Crystal Tower: Entei)
- Pokémon 4Ever: Celebi (Voice of the Forest) (セレビィ時を超えた遭遇, Serebi: Toki o Koeta Sōgū; Celebi: A Timeless Encounter)
- Pokémon Heroes: Latios and Latias (水の都の護神 ラティアスとラティオス, Mizu no Miyako no Mamoru-shin: Ratiasu to Ratiosu; Guardian Gods of the City of Water: Latias and Latios)
