= Grander Musashi =

Japanese manga series

グランダー武蔵 (Gurandā Musashi)
- Genre: Adventure, Fantasy
- Created by: Nobuyuki Fujimoto; Nippon Animation
- Manga
- Written by: Takashi Teshirogi
- Published by: Shogakukan
- Magazine: CoroCoro Comic
- Original run: November 1996 – February 2000
- Volumes: 10
- Anime television series
- Directed by: Takayoshi Suzuki
- Produced by: Yumi Murase (TV Tokyo); Makiko Iwate (TV Tokyo); Kazunori Takashiro (Yomiko); Shigeo Endō
- Music by: Goro Omi
- Studio: Nippon Animation
- Original network: TXN (TV Tokyo)
- Original run: April 2, 1997 – September 24, 1997
- Episodes: 25
- Anime television series

Grander Musashi RV
- Directed by: Takayoshi Suzuki
- Produced by: Makiko Iwate (TV Tokyo); Masakatsu Kozuru (Sotsu Films); Masahiko Kobayashi
- Music by: Goro Omi
- Studio: Nippon Animation
- Original network: TXN (TV Tokyo)
- Original run: April 4, 1998 – December 26, 1998
- Episodes: 39

Grander Musashi (グランダー武蔵, Gurandā Musashi), also known as Super Fisher Grander Musashi and Musashi the Great, is a Japanese manga series created by Takashi Teshirogi that was adapted into two anime seasons. It is a fishing sport anime that teaches audiences fishing methods. The target of this anime is usually families and children; it teaches them to appreciate nature and not destroy it. The main theme is protecting Mother Earth from being destroyed by technology and the greed of humans. It has influenced many audiences to fish for sport, as well as giving a good message to preserve nature. Grander Musashi is supported by the Fishing Club in Japan, and in the ending credits it shows a gallery of the bass fish they captured.

== Plot ==
The series is divided into two seasons: Grander Musashi and Grander Musashi RV.

=== Grander Musashi ===
Musashi lives with his father. His mother left them three years ago, but Musashi believes she will come back. One day they move from Tokyo to a village in the countryside. Musashi hates living in the countryside and asks his father to take him back to Tokyo. He wonders if his mother will be able to find him in their new home.

Soon after moving to the countryside, Musashi happens to see a man fishing for bass with a decoy fish. Musashi is fascinated by lure fishing. He learns a lot from the man and discovers that his mother's father was a grand champion of bass fishing. Musashi feels that fishing could lead him to his missing mother. He shows a marvelous talent for lure fishing and takes trips with his new friends, Mio and Suguru, to many places around the world in search of incredible fish. Through fishing, Musashi comes to enjoy living amongst nature.

=== Grander Musashi RV ===
Musashi Kazama and his two friends, Mio and Suguru, continue their journey traveling around the world in search of seven mysterious objects of fantastic power called "Legenders" — legendary lures in the form of a fish that give more power to attract fish. However, if it uses too much power, it will either cause destruction or hope. Legenders are said to grant anyone who catches them the power to change the world. Unfortunately, Musashi ends up competing with several other fishermen who share his ambition of capturing a Legender.

== Tournament ==
To gain the title of the best fisher, each fisher has to go around the world and capture the biggest and best quality of bass. This task is of high difficulty as bass fish prefer quiet places and are not easily tricked by lures. The difficulty increases when the place is unstable, either caused by nature or by the fisher themselves. Fishers must use their best techniques combined with their lures and their angler strength to win the tournament.

== Legenders ==
- Hawk Legender — Works best in sunlight. It has sharp, gripping hooks to prevent fish from escaping. It can control sunlight power.
- God Legender — The most powerful Legender. It can catch any kind of fish, no matter what the weather conditions are or how fast the fish is. It can control other Legenders.
- Shark Legender — A lure with deadly speed in water but has fragile hooks that cannot reel in any fish heavier than 50 pounds. It can control the wood power.
- Scissor Legender — Shaped like a crab, it has retractable pincer-like hooks and can catch more than one fish. It can control moon power.
- Dragon Legender — A very long lure. Its segmented parts can make it look like living bait in the water, raising the chances of catching a fish quickly and easily. It can control rain power.
- Spider Legender — Works best in muddy water. It can break through the hard mud pots that some fish hide in. It can control earth power.
- Angel/Devil Legender — Formerly a very dangerous lure with very sharp hooks, it changes into a safer lure when it is used with the intention of pure fishing, not hurting other fishers.

== Fishers ==
- Musashi Kazama (voiced by Urara Takano)
  - Main lure: King Orcaizer
  - Legenders: Hawk, God

Musashi is an honorable fisherman who loves and cares greatly about fish. He always cares for Mother Nature like BB and Hattori, but he rarely thinks ahead, and can be reckless with his lures. He's always excited to fish, and loves to compete with others so long as everyone is having fun. As he gets more experience, he comes to understand his Legenders, thus becoming the legendary fisher. He is best friends with Suguru and Mio.

- BB (voiced by Megumi Tano)
  - Main lure: Dragon
  - Legender: Dragon

BB is usually very protective of Mother Nature. She is Musashi's rival competitor and Suguru's love interest. BB believed in her Dragon lure and even cared for it, unlike Musashi who was reckless and thoughtless with his Legender Hawk. She defeated Musashi in a battle to gain the second Legender, but at the price of her Dragon lure being destroyed. However, when she was granted her own Legender, it turned out that her Dragon lure was actually one part of the Legender before they were split apart, and they combined again to create the Dragon Legender.

- Carl Amann (voiced by Hiro Yūki)
  - Main lure: Giga Bass
  - Legender: Shark

Carl is ruthless, hot-tempered, and has very little patience. He doesn't mind interfering with other fishers and has no concern for Mother Nature or other people. He didn't learn to value life until he met Marlene. With Marlene's help, Carl finally caught his own Legender, but at the cost of Marlene's life. When Carl witnessed Marlene's sacrifice that led to her death, he finally understood how important life was; thus, he swore to honor her memory. Afterward, the third Legender Carl caught transformed into a lure called Shark.

- Yun (voiced by Yoshiko Kamei)
  - Main Lure: Top Clarken
  - Legender: Scissor

Yun is always deceitful, and he doesn't fight fairly. He considers himself to be a loner and does not want any friends except his pet. However, he became fond of Mio, and he opened up about his origins to her. With the aid of Mio, Musashi, and Suguru, he was able to win his own Legender in Australia. When Yun received the fifth Legender, he was reluctant to open his hands, fearing it might be a Devil Legender. Encouraged by Mio, Musashi, and Suguru, he opened his hands to reveal his Legender was a Scissor. Yun rejoiced as he knew he earned the Legender.

- Masatsugu Hattori (voiced by Katashi Ishizuka)
  - Main lure: G-Cobra
  - Legender: Spider

Hattori is a trained ninja with a code of honor. He is deeply concerned for Mother Nature and has a sense of fair play. Despite being rivals, Hattori always watches out for Musashi, and has occasionally saved his life. Hattori battled with Kuki Jr. in a fight to claim the sixth Legender because he had to protect the fish from Kuki's reckless ravages. He won the battle with the combined aid of Musashi, BB, Carl, Yun, Suguru, and Mio, and thus earned his own Legender. Yun commented that it is a fitting lure for a ninja.

- Kuki Jr. (voiced by Kōsuke Okano)
  - Main lure: Skeleton Minnow
  - Legender: Devil/Angel

Kuki Jr. is the son of Kuki Sr., who was once Musashi's mentor and enemy. Kuki Jr. is ruthless and does not object to using underhanded tricks or deceptions to win his fights. He claimed his own Legender while competing with his rivals, although he did not earn it fairly. Kuki Jr.'s Legender was a Devil Legender, which then possessed him. When he competed with Musashi for a final time and refused to let his Legender kill Musashi, his change of heart transformed his lure into an Angel Legender.

== Supporting characters ==
- Mio (voiced by Maya Okamoto)

A friend of Musashi. She has supported him ever since they met in their village's school, and constantly looks out for him and Suguru. She gets jealous of any new girl Musashi encounters, as shown in the Dragon Legender Arc in the RV saga, but that jealousy quickly fades when she becomes friends with them as well. She is also Yun's friend, and believed in his innocence in stealing Kuki's lure.

- Suguru (voiced by Kouji Tsujitani)

Another friend of Musashi. A big eater who's smart when it comes to knowing about fish. Sometimes he argues with Musashi, but is always willing to help him when he needs it. He also makes most of Musashi's lures in the first season, and makes a lure for BB in the second season. Suguru has a crush on BB, Musashi's rival.

- Jim (voiced by Kouji Tsujitani)

Mentor and friend to Musashi, as well as his guardian in "RV". He taught all the basic moves Musashi uses and always gives him advice in order to excel in fishing. He was also Musashi's first introduction to fishing in season one back when Musashi's father relocated them to the countryside.

== Theme song ==
=== Grander Musashi ===
- Opening theme: 'Suteki Wa Jikan' by The Pip Pops
- Ending theme: 'Kyou Wa Nana Iro' by The Pip Pops

=== Grander Musashi RV ===
- Opening theme: 'Chase the Wind' by COA
- Ending theme: 'Kimi Ni Makenai Youni' by Satoko Yamano
