= Shunsuke Tsurumi =

Japanese philosopher (1922–2015)

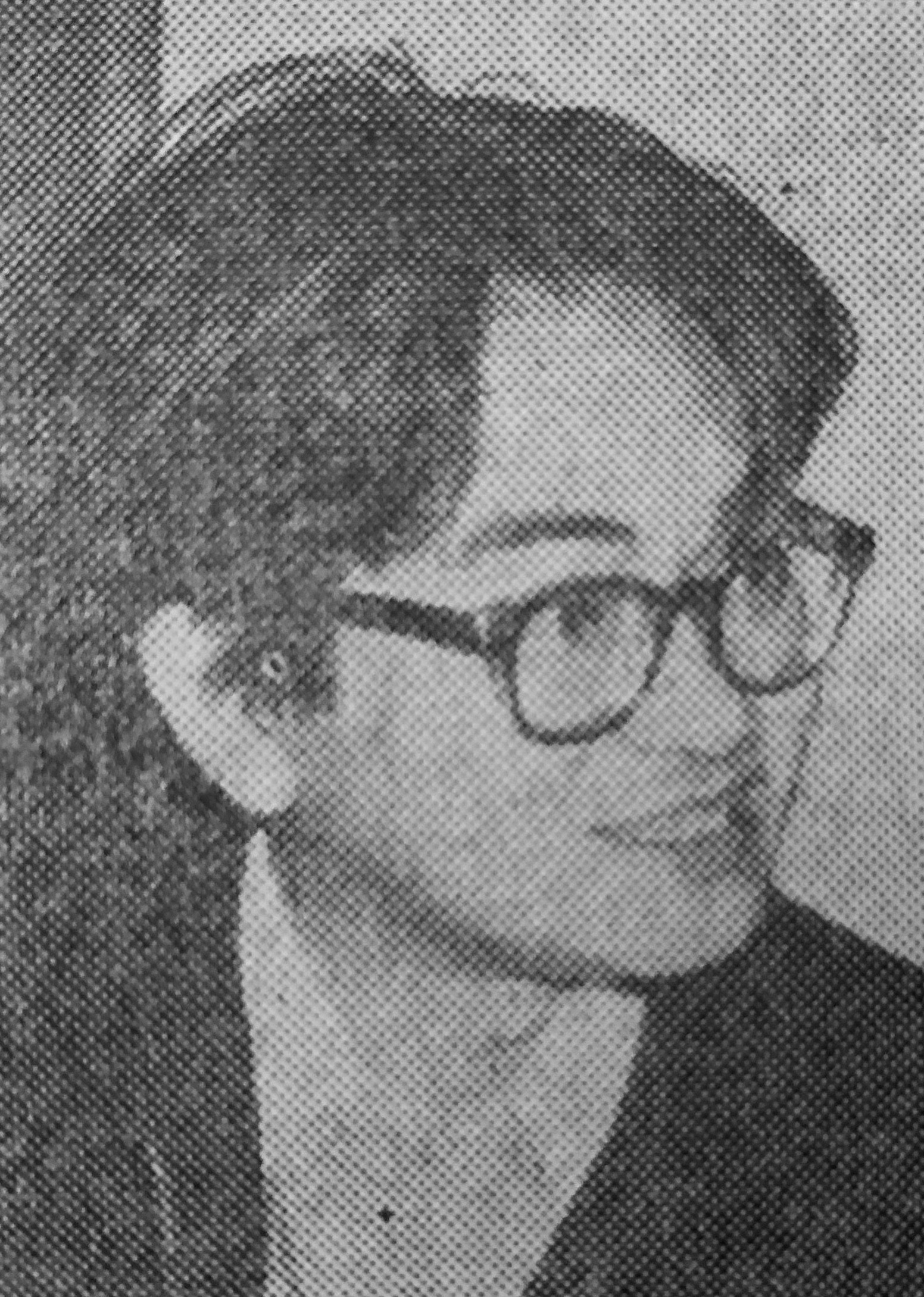
- Shunsuke Tsurumi in 1960
- Born: June 25, 1922; Tokyo
- Died: July 20, 2015 (aged 93); Kyoto
- Education: Harvard University
- Occupations: philosopher, sociologist, historian

Shunsuke Tsurumi (鶴見 俊輔, Tsurumi Shunsuke; June 25, 1922 – July 20, 2015) was a Japanese philosopher, historian, and sociologist.

== Biography ==
Tsurumi Shunsuke was born in Tokyo in 1922. In 1937, his father sent him to study in the United States, where he enrolled at the Middlesex School in Concord, Massachusetts. At the age of 16, he applied to and was accepted into Harvard University, where he majored in philosophy, studying under Willard Van Orman Quine. Tsurumi had excellent grades, but in March 1942 he was arrested by the police as an enemy alien and interred at the Charles Street Jail. In 1942, he succeeded in graduating with honors, but was thereafter deported on a personnel exchange vessel along with his sister Tsurumi Kazuko, Kiyoko Takeda, and Maruyama Masao.

In 1946, Tsurumi started the think tank Shisō no Kagaku Kenkyūkai ("The Science of Thought Research Association") along with seven other people, including three of those who were on board the same deportation vessel with him: Takeda, Maruyama, and his sister Kazuko. In addition, Tsurumi served as editor-in-chief of the affiliated magazine, also named Shisō no Kagaku ("The Science of Thought"). Shiso no kagaku was unusual among Japanese magazines, in that it accepted essays from anybody with no discrimination as to the author's academic or social background; authors printed within its pages included nurses, teachers, and social workers active in poor working-class areas of Tokyo.

Tsurumi taught at Kyoto University from 1948 until 1951, when he took a leave of absence due to a psychiatric illness. In 1954, he resumed his academic career as a professor at Tokyo Institute of Technology.

In 1960, Tsurumi became heavily involved in the Anpo protests against revision of the U.S.-Japan Security Treaty (known as "Anpo" in Japanese). On May 30, he resigned his position at the Tokyo Institute of Technology, in protest against the May 19th Incident, when Prime Minister Nobusuke Kishi rammed the new Security Treaty through the National Diet with only members of his own party present, after having had opposition lawmakers physically removed by police. Distancing himself from hierarchical leftist groups such as the Socialist and Communist parties and labor unions, Tsurumi sought to take advantage of popular outrage at Kishi's anti-democratic actions to foment a new type of "citizen's movement" (shimin undō) that would consist of ordinary citizens, unaffiliated with any preexisting organization, who would "spontaneously" (jihatsuteki ni) organize to take political action. To this end, Tsurumi and other intellectuals associated with his "Science of Thought" group helped establish a small protest group they called the "Voiceless Voices Society" (Koe Naki Koe no Kai), supposedly consisting of ordinary citizens who had spontaneously come together to protest the Security Treaty. Although the Voiceless Voices Society played only a small role in the Anpo Protests, it became the model for the much larger Beheiren anti-Vietnam War organization that Tsurumi and his associates helped establish and promote in the second half of the 1960s.

In 1961, Tsurumi took a new position as Professor of Sociology at Doshisha University in Kyoto. However in 1970, he resigned his post in protest of the university agreeing to allow police to be introduced to the campus to quell student protests.

Tsurumi died on July 20, 2015, of pneumonia in Kyoto, Japan.

== Publications ==
Also thought as a literature and philosophy historian, he wrote several books and articles:

- An Experiment in Common Man's Philosophy
- Ideology and Literature in Japan (1980)
- Japanese conceptions of Asia. Papers of the Japanese Studies Centre. Vol. 5. Melbourne: Japanese Studies Centre. 1982.
- An Intellectual History of Wartime Japan, 1931-1945. 1986.
- A Cultural History of Postwar Japan, 1945-1980. 1987.
- Japanese kokoro. Tokyo: Iwanami Shoten. 2001.
