= Takashi Teshirogi =

Japanese manga artist

Takashi Teshirogi (てしろぎ たかし, Teshirogi Takashi) is a Japanese manga artist who created Grander Musashi, which was adapted into two anime series. Akira Toriyama had an influence on his art style. He is also responsible for illustrating Pocket Monsters: Rekkuu no Houmonsha - Deoxys (ポケットモンスター 裂空の訪問者 デオキシス), which was adapted from Pokémon - Destiny Deoxys.

== Works ==
- Grander Musashi
- Pocket Monsters: Rekkuu no Houmonsha - Deoxys
- Ash & Pikachu
- Ash & Pichu
- Pocket Monsters Battrio
