= Seiko (given name) =

- Gender: Generally feminine
- Language(s): Japanese

Origin
- Meaning: Depends on kanji

Seiko is a Japanese given name, almost exclusively feminine. Its meaning depends on the kanji used to write it.

== Kanji and meaning ==
The "ko" in Seiko is generally written with a kanji meaning "child" (子), and in that case is exclusively feminine; the kanji for "Sei" varies, for example:

- 晴子 ("clear weather"); also read Haruko
- 正子 ("upright", "correct"); also read Masako or Shōko, and also used in Korean to write the name Jeong-ja
- 清子 ("clean", "pure"); also read Kiyoko or Sayako
- 聖子 ("holy"); also read Kiyoko or Shōko, and also used in Korean to write the name Seong-ja
- 青子 ("blue" or "green"); also read Aoko

Rarely, the "ko" may be written with a kanji meaning "lake" (湖). Written this way, the name may be either masculine or feminine.

== People ==
People with this name include:

- Seiko Fujita (藤田 西湖, 1898–1956), Japanese male martial artist
- Seiko Hashimoto (橋本 聖子, born 1964), Japanese politician, House of Councillors member, former ice speed skater and track cycling sprinter
- Seiko Kanno (菅野 聖子, 1933–1988), Japanese painter and poet
- Seiko Kawamura (河村 聖子, born 1984), Japanese volleyball player
- Seiko Lee Japanese soprano
- Seiko Matsuda (松田 聖子, born 1962), Japanese singer
- Seiko Mikami (三上 晴子, 1961–2015), Japanese artist
- Seiko Nakano (中野 聖子, born 1952), Japanese voice actress
- Seiko Niizuma (新妻 聖子, born 1980), Japanese actress
- Seiko Noda (野田 聖子, born 1960), Japanese politician, House of Representatives member
- Seiko Obonai (小保内 聖子, born 1940), Japanese shot putter
- Seiko Okamoto (岡本 聖子, born 1978), Japanese tennis player
- Okuhara Seiko (奥原 晴湖, 1837–1913), Japanese female painter
- Seiko Oomori (大森 靖子, born 1987), Japanese singer-songwriter
- Seiko Shimakage (島影 せい子, born 1949), Japanese volleyball player who competed at the 1972 Summer Olympics
- Seiko Tanabe (田辺 聖子, born 1928), Japanese novelist
- Seiko Yamada (山田 靑子, born 1978), Japanese badminton player
- Seiko Yamamoto (山本 聖子, born 1980), Japanese wrestler
- Seiko Yoshida (吉田 聖子, born 1986), Japanese voice actress

Fictional characters with this name include:

- Seiko Shinohara, in the survival horror video game Corpse Party
- Seiko Kimura, a character from Danganronpa 3: The End of Hope's Peak High School

== See also ==
- People with the Japanese masculine name Seikō (with a long vowel in "kō")
  - Rin Seikō (林 世功, 1842–1880), scholar-bureaucrat of the Ryūkyū Kingdom
  - Seiko Yamanaka (山中 誠晃, born 1989), Japanese football defender
