= Iwata (surname) =

Iwata (written: 岩田 lit. "rock ricefield") is a Japanese surname. Notable people with the surname include:

- Hiroshi Iwata (岩田 寛; born 1981), Japanese golfer
- Karen Iwata (born 1998), Japanese singer
- Kiyomi Iwata (born 1941), Japanese-American artist
- Manzo Iwata (1924–1993), Japanese martial artist
- Masaharu Iwata (born 1966), Japanese video game composer
- Minoru Iwata (born 1983), Japanese baseball pitcher
- Mitsuo Iwata (born 1967), Japanese voice actor
- Nakayama Iwata (1895–1949), Japanese photographer
- Satoru Iwata (1959–2015), Japanese businessman
- Sayuri Iwata (born 1990), Japanese actress and J-Pop artist
- Shinji Iwata (born 1987), Japanese baseball pitcher
- Takuya Iwata (footballer, born 1983), Japanese footballer
- Takuya Iwata (footballer, born 1994), Japanese footballer
- Troy Iwata (born 1991), American comedian, actor, and singer
- Yasunari Iwata (岩田 康誠; born 1974), Japanese jockey
- Yasuo Iwata (1942–2009), Japanese voice actor
- Yuki Iwata (岩田 ユキ; born 1972), Japanese film director and illustrator
