= Kiyone =

Kiyone may refer to:

== Fictional characters ==
- Yuri Kiyone, a character in the series Tenchi Muyo!
- Kiyone Amayuri, a character in the series Magical Project S
- Kiyone Kotetsu, a character in the series Bleach (manga)
- Kiyone Makibi, a character in the series Tenchi Muyo!
- Kiyone Masaki, a character in the series Tenchi Muyo!
- Kiyone Nonomiya, a character in the series My-HiME
- Kiyone Okakura, a character in the series Day Break Illusion
- Kiyone Shiraishi, a character in the series Now That We Draw

== Places ==
- Kiyone, Okayama was a village located in Tsukubo District
- Kiyone Station a passenger railway station
