= Kiyoko Takeda =

Takeda Kiyoko
- 武田清子
- Born: Cho Kiyoko; Hyōgo Prefecture, Japan
- Died: April 12, 2018 (aged 100)
- Education: Union Theological Seminary in the City of New York

Cho Kiyoko (長清子, June 20, 1917 – April 12, 2018), better known as Takeda Kiyoko (武田清子), was a Japanese scholar of the history of ideas. In the 1950s, she contributed to the diplomacy that was hurt by World War II, aimed at restoring relations and understanding among Asian people, including Chinese, Filipino, Indian, and people of other Asian countries. She was the founder of the Social Studies Institute at the International Christian University (ICU) in Tokyo. Takeda Kiyoko was a professor emerita at ICU with a PhD in Literature from the University of Tokyo in 1961.

== Biography ==
Takeda Kiyoko was born in Hyōgo Prefecture, and after graduating from the Department of English Studies at Kobe College, she went to the United States in 1939 and studied at Olivet College as an exchange student. When she finished Olivet, she extended her study abroad at Columbia University for two years, transferred to Union Theological Seminary in the City of New York Graduate School. Takeda's chance to move from Olivet University in Michigan to New York was that her teaching adviser M. Holmes Hartshorne, a scholar and translator for works by Kierkegaard and Immanuel Kant. Hartshorne introduced her to his own mentor Reinhold Niebuhr, and Takeda was invited to New York. Niebuhr and his wife Ursula (Note: Takeda recalls about the Niebuhrs in her essays as 「学者として妻として : ニーバー夫人のこと」 "Gakusha to shite, tsuma to shite : Mrs. Nībā no koto" and II『思想の科学』と私（創立同人へのインタビュー）武田清子「〈ひとびとの哲学〉を探る」 (Sōritsu dōjin eno intabyū—"Shisō no kagaku to watakushi").) took care of her as guardians when Japan and the United States opened up the war so that she could stay in the United States for further studies. (Note: Takeda met both Niebuhr and Paul Johannes Tillich while studying in the US and became a scholar of Christian Ethics, Religious Phylosophy and History of Ideas. At the first World Conference of Christian Youth held in Amsterdam, Takeda had joined the Japanese delegate, when she met the lecturer Niebuhr.) Takeda was one of those students who were deported to Japan on a Swedish vessel on personnel exchange treaty.

== Coming back to Japan ==
During World War II in Japan, Takeda tried to lay out before military officers in charge of a factory where she was employed facts about how those Japanese high school and college students volunteer at the facilities were malnourished. She backed her argument with a chart showing their weight She was nicknamed "Urashima Tarō" by students, meaning she struck them as a person completely lost coming back from abroad. While pretending to obey the military official and national propaganda that Japan would win the War, Takeda was relieved to learn that those students disbelieved the propaganda or they whispered among them the signs of defeat.

== Post-war activities ==
It was during the Christian Youth Convention in Amsterdam in 1939 which she joined as an undergraduate at the Kobe College, and she started her thought about Japan and her relationship to other countries with lasting impact that she was unwelcome as a young woman coming from Japan. As she tried to acquaint with a Chinese woman student who lead the student protest activities in China, that person replied Takeda needed to persuade the Japanese forces to leave her nation before becoming a friend of hers.

Soon after Japan surrendered, she published Shisō no Kagaku with Tsurumi Shunsuke and his sister Kazuko along with Maruyama Masao. Shisō no kagaku was among numerous magazines popped up post-war period, when common people wanted to express themselves. It was unique as it accepted essays from anybody with no discrimination on the authors' academic or sociological background, not limited to politically active students, and printed them on their pages pieces written by nurses, teachers, or social workers for poor factory areas in Tokyo.

Takeda appreciates the trend in the late 1940s to early 1950s in Japanese philosophy that people sought to find their own policy, or defined it as "common men's philosophy " (hitobito no tetsugaku). To realize world peace after World War II, Takeda started to analyze politics and international relations from the viewpoint of ideological history, and on the other hand, she showed an example of <private diplomacy> or emphasized people-to-people trust among Asian including Japanese and Chinese, the Filipino, Indian and others. She confirmed with herself at the 3rd World Conference of Christian Youth held in India in December 1952.
In 1953 Takeda started teaching as an associate professor at International Christian University researching to review the historic relationship between Japan and Asia, and led a community that evolved to the Asian Culture Research Institute in 1971.

Takeda received a PhD of Literature from the University of Tokyo in 1961 with her book Ningenkan no sōkōku : kindai Nihon no shisō to Kirisutokyō (人間観の相剋: 近代日本の思想とキリスト教; 1967). In 1978, she received the Publishing Culture Award from Mainichi Shinbun for Tennōkan no sōkoku : 1945-nen zengo (天皇観の相剋 : 1945年前後), originally a serial in the "World" magazine, translated in English as The Dual-Image of the Japanese Emperor.

In 1997, she was awarded the Christian Merit Award from the Christian Association of Japan with recognition of long-standing achievements in the Christian world. She has served for "Kujo kagakusha no kai" (Article 9 Society) in Japan as a founding member. Kiyoko died in April 2018 at the age of 100.

== See also ==
- Shunsuke Tsurumi
- Masao Maruyama (scholar)
- Yuasa Hachiro

== Bibliography ==
The dual-image of the Japanese Emperor (1988)
