= Kyoko Yonemoto =

Japanese violinist (born 1984)

Kyoko Yonemoto 米元響子
- Kyoko Yonemoto, Auckland, 2009

Background information
- Born: June 25, 1984 (age 41); Tokyo
- Genres: Classical
- Occupation: Violinist
- Instrument: Violin
- Website: Official Website

Kyoko Yonemoto (米元響子; born June 25, 1984 in Tokyo) (Note: Sendai International Music Competition says she was born in Fukuoka.) is Japanese classical music violinist. She has won numerous awards and performs mostly in Europe, where she lives, and in Japan.

== Life and career ==
She began playing the violin at the age of three, studying under Suzuki Aguri at the Toho Gakuen School of Music for Children. In 1997, she began studying under Yoshio Unno. Also in 1997, she placed 4th in the Paganini Competition, becoming the youngest prize winner ever in that competition at age 13, receiving the Enrico Costa Memorial Prize. Later in 2006 she won first place in the Paganini Competition. She went on to study at the École Normale de Musique de Paris, where she studied under Gérard Poulet and graduated with a concertist diploma. In 2004, she studied under Boris Belkin at the Maastricht Academy of Music, where she subsequently graduated with a master's degree in 2012. In 2009 she performed with the Moscow Conservatory with the Moscow State Symphony Orchestra. In 2012 she was invited to the Accademia Musicale Chigiana in Italy to perform all the Brahms sonatas. Yonemoto regularly tours Europe and Japan. She performs chamber music and works with younger musicians. In July 2016 she performed the works of Bedrich Smetana in Bangkok, Thailand. She released her first album in March 2019 on King International and this won Excellence Award from the Agency for Cultural Affairs. Since 2012 she has been a professor at the Maastricht Academy of Music. In April 2019 she performed in the Hachioji Series at the Tokyo Metropolitan Symphony Orchestra. She has lived in Belgium, but now lives in Paris.

== Awards ==
- 1996 - 1st place in the elementary school division of the All Japan Student Music Competition Tokyo Tournament
- 1997 - 4th place at the Paganini International Competition, Enrico Costa Memorial Prize
- 2000 - 2nd place in the violin category of the 69th Japan Music Competition
- 2001 - 1st place, Leucadia Prize, Sumi Prize, and Kuroyanagi Prize in the violin category of the 70th Japan Music Competition
- 2002 - 3rd place at the Long-Thibaud International Competition
- 2005 - Finalist at the Queen Elisabeth International Music Competition
- 2005 – Third place at the 6th Fritz Kreisler International Piano Competition
- 2006 - First Place in the Paganini Moscow International Violin Competition
- 2006 - 1st place at the 27th Michelangelo Abbado International Violin Competition
- 2008 - Idemitsu Music Award
- 2010 - Finalist at the Montreal International Music Competition
