= Seong-ja =

- Hangul: 성자
- RR: Seongja
- MR: Sŏngja

Seong-ja, also spelled Sung-ja, is a Korean given name. Typically, "ja" is written with the hanja meaning "child" (子). Names ending with this hanja, such as Young-ja and Jeong-ja, were popular when Korea was under Japanese rule, but declined in popularity afterward. The hanja used to write the name Seong-ja also correspond to a number of different Japanese given names; for example, both 成子 and 聖子 can be read as the name Seiko.

People with this name include:

- Seund Ja Rhee (1918–2009), South Korean expatriate artist in France
- Shin Seong-Ja (born 1968), South Korean fencer
- Park Sung-Ja (born 1980), South Korean judo practitioner

== See also ==
- List of Korean given names
