= Masako Okōchi =

Japanese voice actress

Masako Ōkōchi (大河内 雅子, Ōkōchi Masako; born March 10, 1983) is a Japanese voice actress from Osaka Prefecture. She is a freelance performer not affiliated with any one studio, and has provided voice work for a number of video games and other projects since beginning her career in 2004.

== Works ==
=== Web anime ===
- Bakumatsu Kikansetsu Irohanihoheto (Girl 2)

=== Video games ===
- Battle Fantasia - Olivia, Odile
- Hexyz Force - Rafael Gemini
- Gurumin: A Monstrous Adventure - Parin
- Minna de Kitaeru Zenno Training - Voice
- Sangokushi Online - Other voices
- The Legend of Heroes: Trails in the Sky - Anelace Elfead
- Wrestling Angels - Sophie Sierra
- Mugen Souls Z - Ending theme

=== Other ===
- Sanrio character Cinnamoroll (Azuki)
