= Your Turn to Die -Death Game by Majority- =

- Publisher: 0up Games
- Artist: Nankidai
- Engine: RPG Maker MV
- Platform: Windows
- Release: August 28, 2017
- Genre: Adventure
- Mode: Single-player

Your Turn to Die -Death Game by Majority- (Japanese: キミガシネ -多数決デスゲーム-, Hepburn: Kimi ga Shine -Tasūketsu Desu Gēmu-) is a Japanese episodic horror adventure game first released on August 28, 2017. The game was developed by Nankidai, a manga artist, and was later adapted into a manga and light novel. An English translation was released in 2019. The game has developed a cult following. It was released on Steam on February 20, 2023 as Early Access.

== Gameplay ==
Your Turn to Die is an adventure game with conversations laid out in a manner akin to a visual novel. The game uses a first-person view. Characters in view can be interacted with directly by clicking on them. Players interact with the onscreen menu to move between areas, save their game, and use items, similar to a point-and-click adventure game. Unlike many RPG Maker games, there is no level progression or character stats. However, there are puzzles which require careful item usage to solve, and minigames that test the player's reaction time. "Discussions" in which the player must deduce the correct logical solution in order to advance time contribute to a large part of the game. During discussion time, focusing on an incorrect or irrelevant statement will cause the main character's "clout" to drop; reducing it to zero causes a game over. Certain decisions made during discussions change the game's plot significantly, though most decisions only give different dialogue options. Other gameplay features include Partner Abilities, usable when traveling with certain characters, and Debates, in which the player must find the incorrect statement within a group of four.

== Plot ==
High-school student Sara Chidouin is walking home from school when she and her friend, Joe Tazuna, are kidnapped and trapped in a mysterious facility. They are then forced to compete in a "Death Game" in which the participants decide who dies by taking majority votes in the "Main Game". With few other options, Sara and Joe follow the commands of their kidnappers and cooperate with the other characters present to explore the facility, survive the Death Game, and learn about their captors. Joe loses the first round of the Main Game and is violently executed. His death traumatizes and mentally destabilizes Sara, who begins to suffer from violent hallucinations.

On the third floor of the facility, the group learns that the organization responsible for the kidnappings produces lifelike dolls, some of which share appearances of the game's participants. They also have AIs of the main characters, which Sara can talk to. After a number of investigations and a concentrated effort to escape on behalf of the remaining participants in the Death Game, they are forced to play the Main Game once again, where Sara ends up with the tie-breaking vote. Sara can either double-cross the other survivors to escape with art student Nao Egokoro, resulting in an early ending, or vote for the executions of job-hopper Sou Hiyori or middle school student Kanna Kizuchi. In the latter two cases, after the Main Game, Sara encounters an AI version of Joe programmed by Sou. If she voted to kill Sou, the AI is benevolent, and encourages her to keep fighting, giving her closure and curing her of her hallucinations. If she voted to kill Kanna, the AI is malicious, and verbally abuses Sara to the point that she has a brief psychotic break, completely forgets Joe, and begins to act more ruthlessly without the memory of his influence.

Upon advancing to the next floor, Sara and the five remaining survivors encounter six dolls called the "Dummies": doll copies of participants who died in their first trials before meeting any other participants of the death game. During their exploration of this part of the facility, the group learns that the organization responsible for the Death Game is called ASU-NARO. One of the Dummies, Ranmaru Kageyama, suggests that he and Sara kill the entire party and escape together. If Kanna survived, Sara dismisses the idea outright; if Sou survived, Sara briefly entertains the idea, giving him the confidence to kill the surviving Yabusame sibling, and potentially being executed himself. Eventually, the party clears the floor, although at least five of the Dummies are destroyed in the process, leaving either baker Mai Tsurugi, salaryman Shunsuke Hayasaka, or boxer Naomichi Kurumada as the lone remaining Dummy. Sara and the remaining survivorsーformer police officer Keiji Shinogi, grade school student Gin Ibushi, and, dependent on previous decisions, either Sou; Kanna and punk musician Reko Yabusame; or Kanna and wrongfully convicted prisoner Alice Yabusame, advance to the final Main Game to confront the masterminds behind the Death Game.

The story is under development as of December 2025, going up to Chapter 3, Part 1-B.

== Development and release ==
Nankidai has hosted various livestreams on Niconico in which he discusses the game's development.

Your Turn to Die was released episodically in the form of chapters split into multiple parts. The first part of the first chapter was released on August 28, 2017, followed by the release of the second part of the first chapter on January 31, 2018. The second chapter was similarly split between two releases, the first having been released on August 7, 2018, and the second being released on May 21, 2019. Chapter 3 of Your Turn to Die was further divided into Part 1-A and Part 1-B, with the former being released on February 25, 2020, and the latter being released one year later on May 30, 2021. The second part of chapter 3 was scheduled to release in 2025, but was delayed so more time could be spent polishing it.

On August 28, 2022, a Steam release was announced and was released on February 20, 2023 as Early Access, up to Chapter 3 Part 1-B. The Steam release contains DLC of the artbook with additional pages and a mini episode for each character. The final chapter will be released on Steam first, then the free version later.

== Media ==
=== Manga ===
A manga adaptation, illustrated by Tatsuya Ikegami, was published in Monthly Shōnen Ace from March 26, 2019, to August 26, 2023. Its chapters were compiled in five tankōbon volumes, released between February 25, 2020, and October 26, 2023. English translations for the volumes were published by Yen Press, with translation by Jason Moses and lettering by Phil Christie.

A spin-off manga titled Kimi yon ~dare mo shinanai kimigashine~ (きみよん～誰も死なないキミガシネ～; 'Your Turn to Die Where No One Dies') was released on February 26, 2021. It features yonkoma comics illustrated by Nankidai and Yusuke Higeoni, set in an alternate universe where no one in the story dies.

=== Novel ===
A light novel written by Teshigahara Anemo and published by Kadokawa was released on February 27, 2021. Production of the novel was overseen by Nankidai. The novel retells the events of the game from Joe Tazuna's perspective.

== Reception ==
=== Game ===
ScreenRant's Anastasia Wilds stated "With its suspenseful and thrilling gameplay, Your Turn to Die is a must-play RPG horror maker game", praising the art style and characters. The game has been played over 4,130,000 times as of January 2022.

=== Manga ===
A review by Demelza from Anime UK News described the manga as "generic" and critiqued its character writing, giving it a 5/10.

Two reviews from writers at RightStufAnime had conflicting viewpoints of the manga. Devlen enjoyed the art and found the concept "interesting", but was ultimately unsatisfied by the lack of stakes in the first volume. The second reviewer, Chris S. found the manga "underwhelming", stating that he had seen the concept done before in a better fashion.

A review from Asian Movie Pulse calls the manga "a serviceable entry in the death game genre." The writer points out that the manga has a lot of potential, which has not quite been reached yet due to the manga being unfinished. He praises the art, stating that "Ikegami takes inspiration from the game while bringing his own sense of identity through his art".

== Merchandise ==
Your Turn to Die has a merchandise line licensed by Dwango. The line includes keychains, two music albums with the game's entire OST, and an artbook which was available for a limited time. The website "gJ character G" has a line of Your Turn to Die themed pillows, rings, necklaces, and clothing items based on the characters.
