= Kyoko Sato (curator) =

Japanese curator

Kyoko Sato is a Japanese curator, editor, and former television producer known in New York City. She is the founder, publisher, and editor-in-chief of JapanContemporaries.com, which highlights cross-cultural artistic exchanges and emerging Japanese artists.

Sato began her career at NHK Enterprises in Tokyo before moving to curatorial work in New York. Her most notable exhibition, A Colossal World: Japanese Artists and New York, 1950s–Present, has been acclaimed as the most important historical group show of Japanese art since Alexandra Munroe’s Scream Against the Sky. The exhibition explored decades of Japanese artistic innovation and diaspora presence in New York.

She has appeared multiple times on the cover of Shūkan NY Seikatsu, a Japanese-language newspaper in New York, and twice on the cover of Japan’s Gekkan Gallery magazine. Sato's work has been profiled in publications including The Japan Times, which noted her role in inspiring new artistic energy between Japan and New York, and Whitehot Magazine, which featured her as a Japanese curator in New York.

She has also curated exhibitions of Japanese designer Hiroko Koshino at WhiteBox in New York, and co-produced projects with filmmaker Motoichi Adachi. Sato’s curatorial efforts extend to collaborations with institutions such as the Metropolitan Museum of Art and contemporary art websites like Tagboat.

In The Brooklyn Rail, her work was highlighted for its role in reshaping perceptions of Japanese contemporary art through new generation artists.
