= Atomi Kakei =

- 跡見花蹊
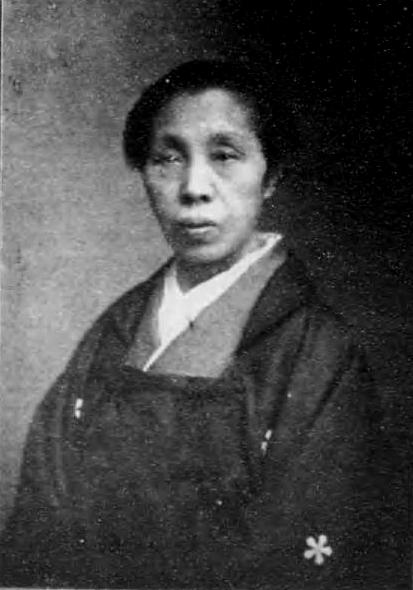
- Born: May 10, 1840; Osaka, Settsu Province, Japan
- Died: January 10, 1926 (aged 85)
- Other name: 滝野 (Takino)

Atomi Kakei (跡見 花蹊; May 10, 1840 – January 10, 1926) was a Japanese calligrapher, Maruyama school painter, scholar of Sino-Japanese studies, and Meiji period educator. She founded the Atomi School in 1875 in Kanda, Tokyo, one of the oldest women's universities in Japan.

== Biography ==
Atomi Kakei was born in Osaka into the rural elite. Both of her parents were well-educated, and they both taught at her father's juku.

As the daughter of a scholar of Chinese learning, she had the opportunity to be educated in the Chinese Classics, a field that was traditionally male dominated. She studied calligraphy under Setsuan Miyahara, a student of Sanyo Rai. She studied painting under painters Oryu Maruyama, Raisho Nakajima, and Hine Taizan. She is known for her decorative work inside the Sakura, Chiba mansion of Hotta Masatomo.

In 1857, she moved to Kyoto to study. She returned to her family several years later to help her father run his juku. There, she taught painting, calligraphy, and poetry. By 1870, she had run a juku in Osaka for six years and in Kyoto for five. However, her primary interest was in art rather than education. That same year, she moved to Tokyo, where she later founded the Atomi School.

In Tokyo, the social conditions of women in the city inspired her to reform girls' education. She opened another juku, which eventually grew to become the Atomi School.

The Atomi School taught girls practical subjects in addition to Chinese and Japanese Classics. Atomi Kakei served as the head of the school until 1919, when she was replaced by her adopted daughter. She remained active with the school and the cause of women's education until her death in 1926.

== Educational Philosophy ==
Atomi Kakei believed that the woman's primary role was within the family. As such, the Atomi School was founded with the goal of preparing girls to be wives and mothers. While she encouraged women to obey their husbands, she said to not do so blindly, knowing why. Atomi stressed the importance of women's contributions to the nation's stability and economic success:

The Japanese spirit is not something possessed by men alone; in their faithfulness to their country and their sincere heart there is no difference between men and women.

— Atomi Kakei, "Oriorigusa," 133-136.

She encouraged women to supplement their husband's income by engaging in some form of art or craft. She also advised against spending money unnecessarily on luxuries, and encouraged frugality. Atomi rejected what she referred to as the 'new woman,' those who were challenging the traditional social order, such as women who chose to stay unmarried.

Atomi Kakei believed that real social change had to come from within, and encouraged women to first work on themselves.
