= Kiyomi Iwata =

American artist

- Born: 1941 (age 84–85); Kobe, Japan

Kiyomi Iwata (born 1941) is an American textile sculptor. Born in Kobe, Japan, she emigrated to the United States in 1961. Her work is collected in the Smithsonian American Art Museum, the Virginia Museum of Fine Arts, the Fine Arts Museums of San Francisco and the Metropolitan Museum of Art, New York.
