= Masako Miwada =

Japanese educator (1843–1927)

- 三輪田 真佐子
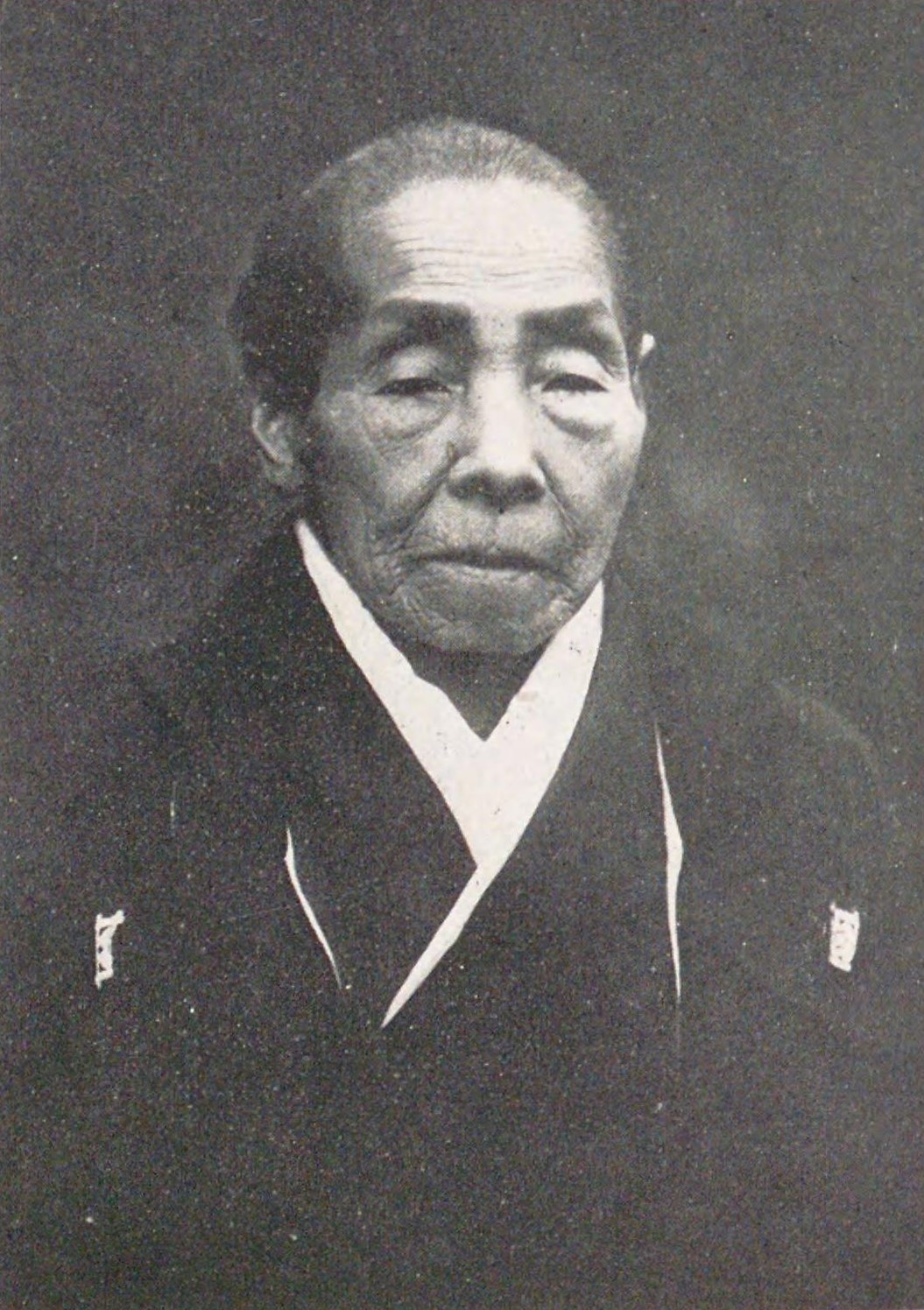
- Born: 30 January 1843; Kyoto, Japan
- Died: 3 May 1927 (age 84)
- Other name: Miwata Masako
- Occupation: Educator

Masako Miwada (Japanese: 三輪田 真佐子; 30 January 1843 – 3 May 1927), sometimes written as Miwata Masako, was a Japanese educator and writer who promoted girls' schooling in the Meiji era.

== Early life and education ==
Miwada was born in Kyoto, the daughter of a Confucian scholar. "I resolved that so long as I studied there was no reason why I should not become a superior scholar even though I was a woman," she recalled of her early training.

== Career ==
Miwada was an advocate for girls' secondary education in nineteenth-century and early twentieth-century Japan. She taught in the household of a court noble, Iwakura Tomomi. In 1880, as a widow with a young son, she opened a school in her late husband's hometown, Matsuyama, where both boys and girls were admitted as students. She also taught at a teacher-training program, where most of her students were men.

Miwada moved to Tokyo with her son in 1887, and opened a new co-educational school there, this time focused on teaching English and mathematics as well as Chinese learning (kangaku). This school closed in 1890, when she began teaching at government schools. in 1901, she became a professor at Japan Women's College. She was a member of the Women's Association for the Relief of Mine-Polluted Areas, and visited Tochigi Prefecture after it was badly affected by pollution from the Ashio Copper Mine.

Miwada founded the Miwada Girls' High School in Tokyo in 1902. By 1925, the school had 970 students. The school still exists as of 2024.

== Publications ==
- Joshi no honbun (1894, A Woman's Place)
- Joshi shosei ron (1897, A Discourse on Woman's Conduct of Life)
- Joshi kyoiku yogen (1897, An Outline of Women's Education)
- Jokun no shiori (1901, A Guidebook of Lessons for Women)
- Joshi no tsutome (1905, A Woman's Duty)
- Shin katei kun (1907, New Lessons for the Family)
- Oshiegusa (1917, Essays on Teaching)

== Personal life ==
She married Miwada Mototsuna, a shrine priest and bureaucrat, in 1869. They had a son. Her husband became ill in 1875, and he died in 1879. Her son died in 1890. In 1893, she adopted one of her male students, Yamashita Tomogoro (1870–1965, also known as Miwada Motomichi).

Miwada died in 1927, at the age of 84. Her descendants lived in the United States before and after World War II. Her grandson Motonari Miwada was detailed at Ellis Island in 1942, before being repatriated to Japan that year. Her great-granddaughter Patricia Yamada married physicist Taiji Yamanouchi in 1961.
