= Yumi Tsukirino =

Japanese manga artist (born 1950)

- Area: Manga artist
- Pseudonym: Yumi Tsukirino (月梨野 ゆみ)

Yumi Tsukirino (born January 5, 1950) is a Japanese manga artist born in Saitama Prefecture. Representative works are Magical Pokémon Journey and Fluffy, Fluffy Cinnamoroll. Nicknamed YOji, she previously used the pen name Yumi Tsukirino (月梨野ゆみ, Tsukirino Yumi) (which is pronounced the same as her current name but uses different Japanese characters).

In addition to creating the art for the OSTER project albums, she has also created art for singles such as Miracle Paint.

== Awards ==
- 37th Shōgakukan Shinjin Komikku Taishō (小学館新人コミック大賞; lit. Shōgakukan's big prize for comics by new creators), girl/ladies department

== List of works ==
=== Serialised ===
- Magical Pokémon Journey (as 月梨野ゆみ, published in Ciao July 1997 – February 2003)
- Pocket Monster Chamo Chamo Pretty (ポケットモンスター チャモチャモ☆ぷりてぃ♪, Poketto Monsutā Chamo Chamo Puriti) (as 月梨野ゆみ, published in Ciao March 2003 – September 2006)
- Fluffy, Fluffy Cinnamoroll (ふわふわ♥シナモン, Fuwafuwa Shinamon) (published as 月梨野ゆみ in Shōgaku Sannensei November 2004 – March 2005 and Shōgaku Yonensei January 2005 – March 2005, later published as つきりのゆみ in Shōgaku Ichinensei April 2005 – March 2008, Shōgaku Ninensei November 2004 – December 2007, Shōgaku Sannensei November 2004 – August 2007, Shōgaku Yonensei April 2004 – March 2008 and Putchi-gumi Vol. 1 – Vol. 6)
- Puri Kawa Cinnamon Angels!! (プリ☆かわ☆シナモンエンジェルス!!, Puri Kawa Shinamonenjerusu!!) (Shōgaku Sannensei September 2007 – March 2008, Shōgaku Gonensei May 2005 – February 2007)
- Miracle! Mimika (味楽る!ミミカ, Mirakuru! Mimika) (Putchi-gumi Vol. 9 – Vol. 11)
- Stitch! (スティッチ!, Sutitchi!) (published in Shōgaku Ninensei April 2009 – July 2009, Shōgaku Sannensei October 2008 – August 2009, Shōgaku Yonensei May 2008 – July 2009 and Shōgaku Gonensei June 2008 – July 2009)

=== Short stories ===
- Christal Change!! (クリスタル・チェンジ!!, Kurisutaru Chenji!!) (debut work in Ciao March 1996)
- Shūkaijo no Ōji-sama (集会所の王子さま) (Ciao DX supplementary spring 1996 issue)
- Moshimo Ashita ga Mieta Nara (もしも明日が見えたなら) (Ciao DX supplementary summer 1996 issue)
- School Jack!! (スクールジャック!!, Sukūru Jakku!) (extra issue included with Ciao in September 1996)
- Omakase! Data Book (おまかせ!データブック, Omakase! Dētabukku) (Ciao January 1997)
- Tulip no Hanakotoba (チューリップの花言葉, Chūrippu no Hanakotoba) (Ciao DX supplementary winter 1997 issue)
- Sweet Arbeit (スウィートアルバイト, Suwiito Arubaito) (Ciao May 1997)
- Hōkago no Lucky Cat (放課後のラッキーキャット, Hōkago no Rakkii Kyatto) (Ciao DX supplementary autumn issue 2000)
- Hare Tokidoki ga Chō!? (晴れときどきがちょう!?) (Ciao DX supplementary spring issue 2001)
- Yoru Tokidoki Kitsune!? (夜ときどきキツネ!?) (Ciao DX supplementary summer 2001 issue)
- Sora no Kisekiiro ~Ichiban no Tomodachi~ (空の奇跡色〜いちばんの友だち〜) (Ciao DX supplementary autumn issue 2001)
- Yuki Nochi Penguin!? (雪のちペンギン!?, Yuki Nochi Pengin!?) (Ciao DX supplementary winter issue 2001)
- Mahōtsukai to Okashihime (魔法使いとお菓子姫) (Ciao DX supplementary spring issue 2002)
- Mahōtsukai no Okashihime 2 (魔法使いとお菓子姫2) (Ciao DX supplementary summer issue 2002)
- Piyopiyo Clinic (ぴよぴよ☆クリニック, Piyopiyo Kurinikku) (Ciao DX supplementary winter issue 2003)
- Kamekame Clinic (かめかめ☆クリニック, Kamekame Kurinikku) (Ciao DX supplementary early summer issue 2003)
- Momonga Clinic (モモンガ☆クリニック, Momonga Kurinikku) (Ciao DX supplementary summer issue 2003)
- Kisetsu Hazure no Asagao-kun (季節はずれの朝顔くん) (Ciao DX supplementary autumn issue 2003)
- Tsūhan no Ōjisama (ツーハンの王子様) (Ciao DX supplementary summer issue 2006)

All made as 月梨野ゆみ.

=== Animated series ===
- Miracle! Mimika (味楽る!ミミカ, Mirakuru! Mimika) (in charge of storyboards since the episode aired in April 2008)

== Paperback volumes ==
- Magical Pokémon Journey (as 月梨野ゆみ): 10 volumes (published by Shōgakukan under the brand Flower Comics Special)
- Pocket Monster Chamochamo Pretty (ポケットモンスター チャモチャモ☆ぷりてぃ♪, Poketto Monsutā Chamochamo Puriti) (as 月梨野ゆみ): 3 volumes (published by Shōgakukan under the brand Flower Comics)
- Hare Tokidoki ga Chō!? (晴れときどきがちょう!?) (as 月梨野ゆみ): 1 volume (published by Shōgakukan in May 2002 under the brand Flower Comics)
- Piyopiyo Clinic (ぴよぴよ☆クリニック, Piyopiyo Kurinikku) (as 月梨野ゆみ): 1 volume (published by Shōgakukan in October 2003 under the brand Flower Comics)
- Fuwafuwa Cinnamon (ふわふわ♥シナモン, Fuwafuwa Shinamon): 5 volumes (published by Shōgakukan under the brand Tentōmushi Comics)
- Fuwafuwa Cinnamon Colour Edition (カラー版 ふわふわ♥シナモン, Karāban Fuwafuwa Shinamon): 3 volumes (published by Shōgakukan under the brand Pikkapika Comics)
- Stitch! (スティッチ!, Sutitchi!): 2 volumes (published by Shōgakukan under the brand Tentōmushi Comics Special)

== Non-Japanese publications ==
Her Magical Pokémon Journey has been partially published in the US by Viz Media, in Singapore in English by Chuang Yi, in Germany by Egmont Manga & Anime and in France by Glénat. Fluffy, Fluffy Cinnamoroll has also been published in English by VizKids.

Her Stitch! manga has been published in the US by Tokyopop.
