= Kitty (given name) =

Kitty or Kittie is a feminine given name, an English diminutive of Katherine or Irish diminutive of Caitlin and an extension of Kit.

== People ==
=== A–K ===
- Kitty (actor) (born 1952), Indian actor, director and screenwriter
- Kitty (musician) (born 1993), American singer
- Kitty Aldridge (born 1962), British actress and writer
- Kitty Anderson (activist) (born 1981), Icelandic intersex activist
- Kitty Anderson (headmistress) (1903–1979), British schoolteacher and headmistress
- Kitty Baker (1912–2014), American mathematics educator, artist and weaver, and author
- Kitty Barne (1882–1961), British screenwriter and author
- Kitty Black (1914–2006), South African playwright and literary agent
- Kitty Barry Blackwell, adopted daughter of Elizabeth Blackwell
- Kitty Blanchard (1847–1911), American actress
- Kitty Bluett (1914–1994), English-Australian actress
- Kitty ter Braake (1913–1991), Dutch sprinter
- Kitty Bransfield (1875–1947), American baseball player
- Kitty Brashear (1877–1934), American baseball player
- Kitty Brazelton (born 1951), American musician
- Kitty Brennan (born 1950), American judge
- Kittie Brighton (1879–1943), American politician
- Kitty Brown (born 1899), American classic female blues singer
- Kittie Bruneau (1929–2021), Canadian artist
- Kitty Bugge (1878–1938), Norwegian feminist and union leader
- Kitty Burke, American entertainer
- Kitty Burns (1925–2016), Scottish artist
- Kitty Byron (born 1878), British criminal convicted to life imprisonment
- Kitty Calavita (born 1944), American criminologist
- Kitty Calhoun (born 1960), American mountain climber
- Kitty Canutt (1899–1988), American bronc rider
- Kitty Carlisle (1910–2007), American actress and singer
- Kitty Herbert, Countess of Carnarvon (1772-1813), English noblewoman
- Kitty Carruthers (born 1961), American figure skater
- Kitty Castledine (born 2002), English actress
- Kitty Cheatham (1864-1946), American musician and actor
- Kitty Chen (born 1944), American actress, and playwright
- Kitty Chiller (born 1964), Australian modern pentathlete
- Kitty Clive (1711–1785), English actress
- Kitty Colyer (1881–1972), British music hall performer and politician
- Kitty Cone (1944–2015), American disability rights activist
- Kitty Cooper (born 1950), American bridge player and writer
- Kitty Cordeux (1862–1962), British activist and novelist
- Kitty da Costa (1710–1747), 18th century breach of contract defendant
- Kitty Courbois (1937–2017), Dutch actress
- Kitty Crimes, American musician
- Kitty Crowther (born 1970), Belgian writer and illustrator
- Kitty van der Mijll Dekker (1908–2004), Dutch textile artist
- Kitty Donaldson, British political journalist and commentator
- Kitty Doner (1895–1988), American vaudeville performer and male impersonator
- Kittie Doswell (1939–2011), American jazz musician
- Kitty Dukakis (1936–2025), American author
- Kitty Duterte (born 2004), Youngest daughter of Rodrigo Duterte
- Kitty Empire (born 1970), British writer and music critic
- Kitty Friele Faye (born 2002), Norwegian pole vaulter
- Kitty Ferguson (born 1941), American science writer and lecturer
- Kitty Fisher (1741–1767), English courtesan
- Kitty Fitzgerald (born 1946), Irish born writer
- Kitty Flanagan (born 1968), Australian comedian
- Kitty Burns Florey (born 1943), American writer
- Kitty Flynn (1926–2025), Irish historian
- Kitty Foster (1790–1863), African American property owner
- Kitty Petrine Fredriksen (1910–2003), Norwegian politician
- Kitty Garesche (1850–1940), American nun and academic headmistress
- Kitty Garman (1926–2011), English artist
- Kitty Geisow (1876–1958), New Zealand painter and insurance broker
- Kitty Gordon (1878–1974), English stage and silent film actress
- Kitty Grande (1919–1999), Norwegian Nazi collaborator
- Kitty Green (born 1984), Australian writer and director
- Kitty Hanley (c. 1845 – 1917), Wiradjuri matriarch and midwife
- Kitty van Haperen (born 1976), Dutch athlete and bobsledder
- Kitty Harris (1899–1966), Soviet spy
- Kitty Harrison (tennis) (1934–2026), American tennis coach
- Kitty Hart-Moxon (born 1926), Polish-born Holocaust survivor and author
- Kitty Hawks (born 1946), Daughter of Slim Keith and Howard Hawks
- Kitty Hayes (1928–2008), Irish concertina player
- Kitty Horrorshow, Independent video game developer
- Kitty de Hoyos (1941–1999), Mexican actress
- Kitty Hunter (1740-1795), English noblewoman
- Kitty Lee Jenner (1853–1936), English author and artist
- Kitty Joyner (1916–1993), American electrical engineer
- Kitty Jutbring (born 1977), Swedish DJ and television host
- Kitty Kain (1908–1997), New Zealand dietitian and air force leader
- Kitty Kallen (1921–2016), American singer
- Kitty Kantilla (1928–2003), Australian Aboriginal painter
- Kitty Kántor (born 1993), Hungarian actress
- Kitty Kat (born 1982), German rapper and singer
- Kitty Kelley (born 1942), Author of unauthorized biographies
- Kitty Kelly (1902–1968), American actress
- Kitty Kenney (1880–1952), British suffragette
- Kitty Kielland (1843–1914), Norwegian artist
- Kitty Kiernan (1892–1945), Fiancée of Michael Collins
- Kitty King (born 1982), British eventing rider
- Kitty Kirkpatrick (1802–1889), Anglo-Indian noble
- Kittie Knox (1874–1900), African American female cyclist
- Kitty Kuo (born 1983), Taiwanese poker player
- Kitty Kuse (1904–1999), German lesbian rights activist

=== L–Z ===
- Kitty Lai (born 1966), Hong Kong actress
- Kitty Lai (Hong Kong artist) (born 1994), Hong Kong actress
- Kitty Lambert, American LGBT rights activist
- Kitty Leroy (1850–1879), American saloon owner
- Kitty Loftus (1867–1927), English dancer, singer and actor-manager
- Kitty Lossius (1892–1981), Norwegian author
- Kitty Lovell-Smith (1886–1973), New Zealand linotype operator and shop manager
- Kitty Lunn (born 1950), American ballet dancer and actress
- Kitty MacCann (1922–2010), Irish amateur golfer
- Kitty MacCormack (1892–1975), Irish designer and owner of the Dun Emer Guild
- Kitty Mackay (1915–1974), Australian swimmer
- Kitty van Male (born 1988), Dutch field hockey player
- Kitty Margolis (born 1955), American jazz singer
- Kitty Marion (1871–1944), Actress, suffragette, and birth control activist
- Kitty Marshall (1870–1947), British suffragette
- Kitty McEwan (1894–1969), Australian sports journalist
- Kitty McGeever (1966–2015), English actress and comedian
- Kitty McHugh (1906–1954), American actress
- Kitty McShane (1897–1964), Irish actress
- Kitty Melrose (1881–1912), English stage actress and singer
- Kitty Muggeridge (1903–1994), British writer and translator
- Kitty Pultara Napaljarri (born 1930), Australian Indigenous artist
- Kitty Wilmer O'Brien (1910–1982), Irish painter
- Kitty O'Neil (1946–2018), American stuntwoman and racer
- Kitty O'Neil (dancer) (1855–1893), American dancer
- Kitty Oppenheimer (1910–1972), American biologist
- Kitty Oxholm, American politician from Vermont
- Kittie Fenley Parker (1910–1944), American botanist
- Kitty Black Perkins (born 1948), Toy fashion designer
- Kitty Piercy (born 1942), American politician
- Kitty Pilgrim (born 1954), American journalist
- Kitty Pluto (1877–1946), Kaanju gold miner and prospector
- Kitty Ponse (1897–1982), Swiss zoologist and endocrinologist
- Kitty Poon (born 1964), Hong Kong politician
- Kitty Shiva Rao (1903–1980), Austrian Montessori teacher and theosophist
- Kitty Rehberg (born 1938), American politician
- Kitty Rhoades (1951–2016), American politician
- Kittie Roberts (1885–1970), British artist
- Kitty Rothschild (1885–1946), American socialite
- Kitty Sanders (born 1980), Dutch volleyball player
- Kitty Scott-Claus, British drag performer
- Kitty Shannon (1887–1974), English artist and illustrator
- Kitty Space, Vietnamese-French drag queen
- Kitty Stryker (born 1984), American sex educator and activist)
- Kitty Swan (born 1943), Danish actress
- Kitty Swink (born 1954), American actress
- Kitty Xu Ting (1990–2016), Chinese actress and blogger
- Kitty Tsui (born 1952), Chinese American author, poet, actor, and bodybuilder
- Kitty Ussher (born 1971), British politician
- Kitty Watson (1886–1967), American vaudeville comedian
- Kitty Wells (1919–2012), American country music singer
- Kitty Wentzel (1868–1961), Norwegian writer and journalist
- Kitty White (1923–2009), American jazz singer
- Kitty Wilkins (1857–1936), American horse breeder
- Kitty Wilkinson (1786–1860), Irish migrant and public washhouse pioneer
- Kitty Wilson-Evans, American historical interpreter and storyteller
- Kitty Winn (born 1943), American actress
- Kitty Wintringham (1908–1966), American journalist
- Kitty Yuen (born 1970), Hong Kong performer
- Kitty Zijlmans (born 1955), Dutch art historian

== Fictional characters ==
- Kitty, in the television series Danny Phantom
- Hello Kitty, also known as Kitty White
- Kitty Bell, in the Sailor Moon series
- Catherine "Kitty" Bennet, in Jane Austen's 1813 novel Pride and Prejudice
- Kitty Forman, in the television series That '70s Show
- Kitty Foyle, the title character of the 1939 novel Kitty Foyle and the 1940 film based on the novel
- Kitty Freekowtski, the name for the cat in the Tubi version of The Fabulous Furry Freak Brothers
- Kitty Jones, in The Bartimaeus Trilogy novels by Jonathan Stroud
- Kitty Keene, the title character of Kitty Keene, Inc., a 1937–1941 American radio show
- Kitty Kenarban, Stevie's mother in Malcolm in the Middle
- Kitty Walker McCallister, in the television series Brothers & Sisters
- Kitty Norville, the title character of a series of urban fantasy novels by Carrie Vaughn
- Kitty Pryde, a superheroine from the Marvel Comics X-Men
- Kitty Sanchez, in the television series Arrested Development
- Kitty Wilde, in the television series Glee

== See also ==
- Kitty (disambiguation)
