= Kitten (disambiguation) =

A kitten is a juvenile cat. Young animals of other species are also sometimes called kittens, for instance young rabbits, rats, or badgers.

Kitten or Kittens may also refer to:

== Aircraft ==
- Mercury Kitten, a 1920s American aircraft
- Dart Kitten, a 1930s British ultra-light aircraft
- Grumman Kitten, a 1940s American aircraft

== Music ==
- Atomic Kitten, an English girl group formed in 1998
- "Kittens", a 1999 song by Underworld from Beaucoup Fish
- Kittens (band), a Canadian noise rock group formed in 1992
- Kitten (band), an indie rock group formed in 2009
  - Kitten (album)

== Other uses ==
- Reliant Kitten, a car
- Kitten heel, a part of a shoe
- KitTen, an Arduino-compatible board
- "Kitten" (The X-Files), a TV episode
- Koshechka, a 1968 Soviet computer animation short film

== See also ==
- Kiten
- Khitan (disambiguation)
- Kitty (given name)
- Kitty (disambiguation)
