= Kitty =

Kitty may refer to:

== Animals ==
- Cat, a small, domesticated carnivorous mammal
  - Kitten, a young cat

== Film ==
- Kitty Films, an anime production company in Japan
- Kitty (1929 film), based on the Deeping novel; the first British talking picture
- Kitty (1945 film), starring Paulette Goddard
- Kitty (2002 film), a 2002 Indian Kannada-language film starring Darshan
- Kitty (2016 film), a short film written and directed by Chloe Sevigny

== Games and money ==
- Kitty, in poker terminology, a pool of money built by collecting small amounts from certain pots, often used to buy refreshments, cards, and so on
- Kitty, in card game terminology, additional cards dealt face down in some card games
- Kitty, a colloquial term for prize money or other monies collected by a group

== Music ==
- Kitty (musician) (born 1993), American musician
- "Kitty" (The Presidents of the United States of America song)
- "Kitty" (Cat Stevens song)
- "Mickey" (Toni Basil song) or "Kitty", by Racey
- "Kitty", a traditional song on Red Roses for Me

== Other uses ==
- Kitty (given name), a list of people and fictional characters with the name Kitty or Kittie
- Kitty (terminal emulator)
- Kitty (ship), a list of ships bearing the name Kitty
- Kitty, Texas, United States, a ghost town, see List of ghost towns in Texas
- Kitty (novel), a 1927 novel by Warwick Deeping
- "Kitty" (CSI: Crime Scene Investigation), an episode of CSI: Crime Scene Investigation
- Srinagara Kitty (born 1977), Indian actor

== See also ==
- "Kitty Kitty", a 1994 song by 69 Boyz
- Kittie, an all-female Canadian metal band
- Kity (disambiguation)
- Hello Kitty (disambiguation)
- Miss Kitty (disambiguation)
- Tropical Storm Kitty (disambiguation)
