= Kuse =

Kuse may refer to:

== Places ==
- Kuse, Okayama, Japan
- Kuse District, Kyoto, Japan
- Kushe Rural Municipality, Nepal

== Surnames ==
- Kitty Kuse (1904-1999), German activist for lesbian rights

== Other uses ==
- KUSE-LD, a television station in the United States
- Kuse Station, a train station in Maniwa, Okayama Prefecture, Japan
