= Ton Schulten =

Dutch painter (1938–2025)

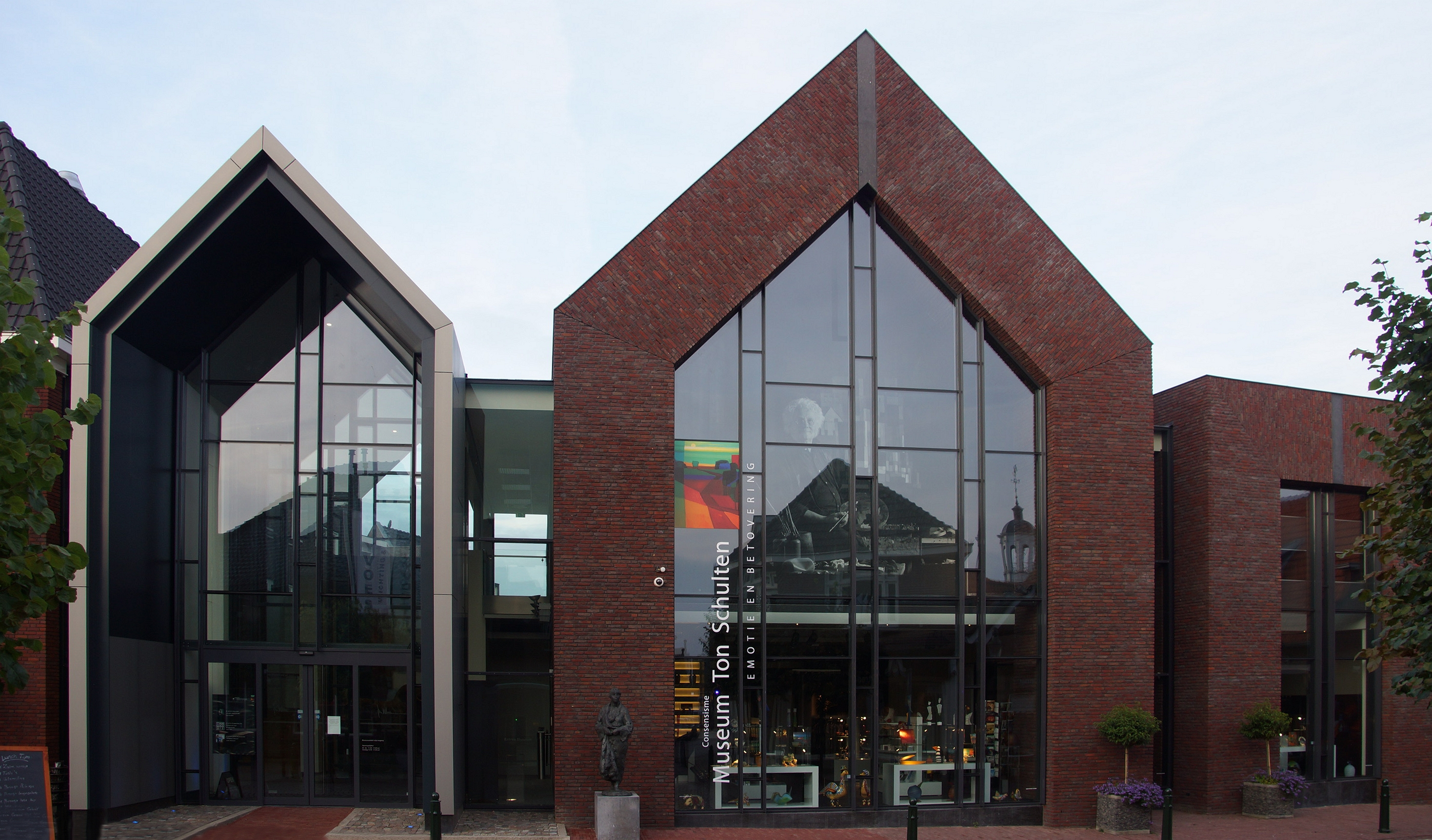
Museum Ton Schulten in Ootmarsum

Ton Schulten (25 April 1938 – 31 October 2025) was a Dutch painter who mainly painted landscapes using bright blocks of colour.

Born in Ootmarsum, Overijssel, Schulten was one of a baker's six children. He graduated from the Enschede Academy for Art and Industry in 1962 as a graphic designer and worked in advertising. In 1991 he was in a serious car accident on Tenerife, in which a friend was killed and he and his wife Ank Lammerink were put into a coma. After the accident his style changed and he began painting landscapes of the Twente area using initially primary colours and later also pastel shades. Ootmarsum houses Schulten's own gallery and a Ton Schulten museum, which opened in 1997. His work has great commercial success. He was knighted a member of the Order of Orange-Nassau in 2000. In 2004 the German art critic Hartmut Rau named his style of painting Concensism. In 2005 Schulten successfully sued an amateur painter for making works in his style.

Schulten died in his hometown on 31 October 2025, at the age of 87.

== Exhibitions ==
- Museum of Artlery, Atlanta, Santa Monica
