= Capture of Ootmarsum =

1597 siege

Capture of Ootmarsum (1597)
- Part of the Eighty Years' War & the Anglo–Spanish War
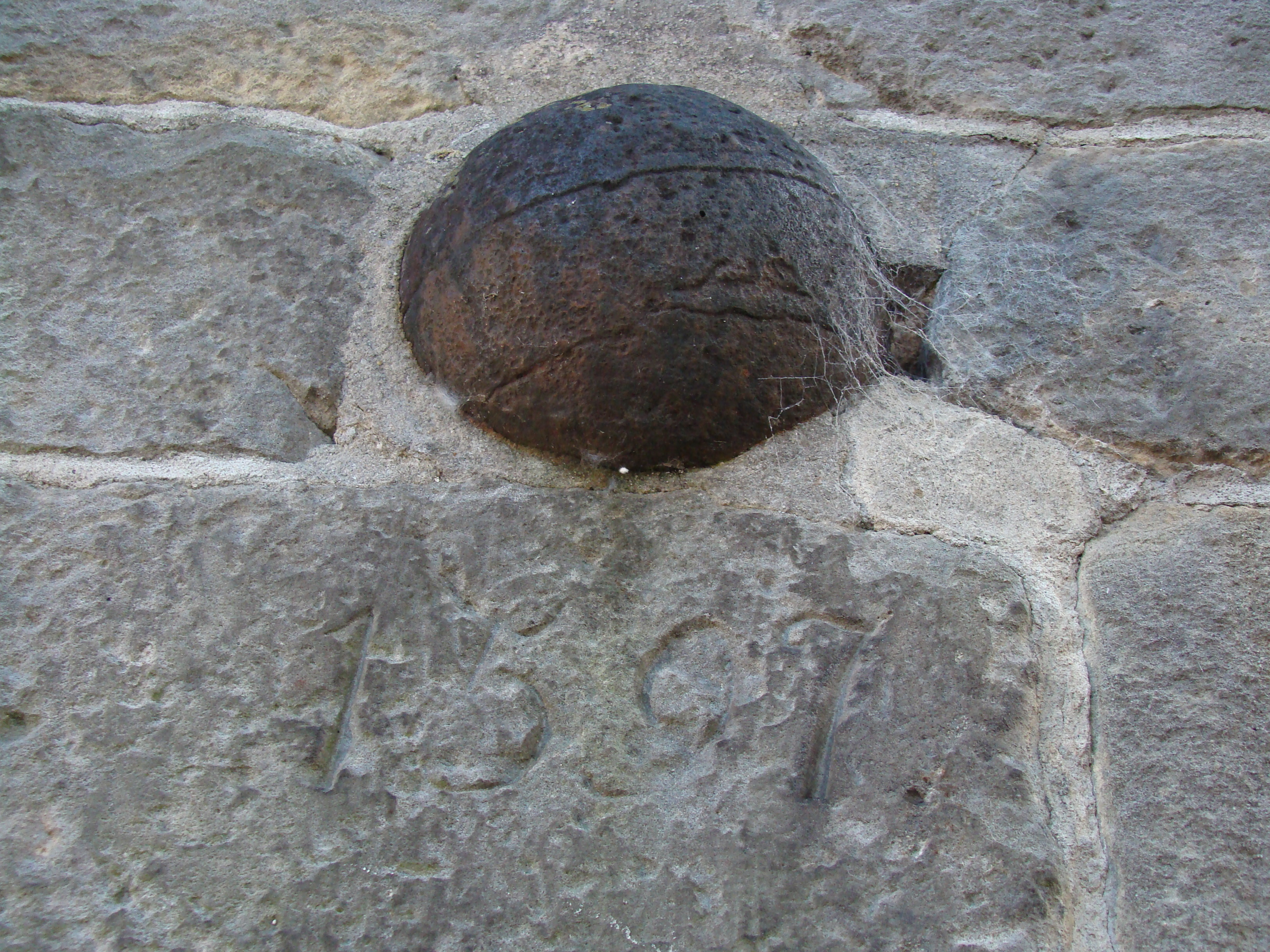
- Cannonball from the siege lodged in the church in Ootmarsum today
Date	19–21 October 1597
Location	Ootmarsum (present-day Netherlands)
Result	Dutch & English victory

Belligerents
Dutch Republic; England	(Spain) Spanish Empire

Commanders and leaders
Count Van Duivenvoorde	Otto van den Sande

Strength
2,800	120

Casualties and losses
Unknown (light)	All captured

The Capture of Ootmarsum in 1597 was a short siege, that took place during the Eighty Years' War and the Anglo–Spanish War by a Dutch and English army led by Count Van Duivenvoorde while Maurice of Nassau was besieging Oldenzaal. The siege lasted from 19 to 21 October, where the Spanish garrison of Ootmarsum under the governor, Otto Van Den Sande, surrendered and was then occupied by the besiegers. The siege was part of Maurice's successful offensive against the Spaniards during the same year.

After the capture of Enschede and with the exodus of the surrendered Spanish garrison, Maurice went with the Dutch and English army to Oldenzaal. Before Maurice got there however he decided then to split his army with the main army headed to Oldenzaal and a force under Count Van Duivenvoorde sent to Ootmarsum in order to submit the city to his authority.

== Siege and capture ==
As with the capture of Enschede the same process took place; a Dutch trumpeter under a flag of truce was sent to the gate of Ootmarsum to demand the surrender. Duivenvoorde threatened that under Maurice's orders his army would inflict the same destruction that befell Bredevoort and Groenlo during their capture a few weeks before. The garrison commander Otto van den Sande replied that the King had commanded him to defy the besiegers and hold firm and that he himself could not surrender as only someone with a higher authority could so. Sande thus ordered continuous cannon fire from the ramparts which continued over the whole night, causing casualties amongst the English troops digging a siege trench.

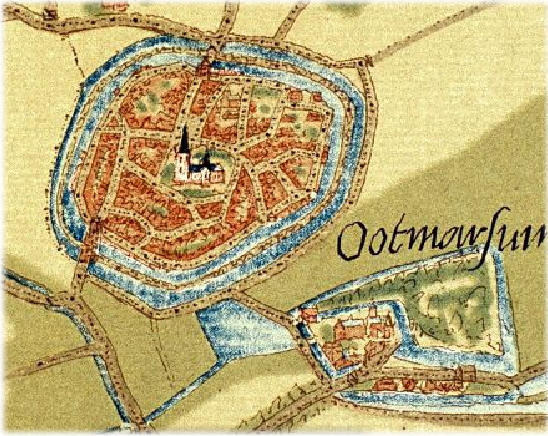
Embroidery of Ootmarsum at time of siege

Upon hearing the report of the resistance, Maurice subsequently sent four heavy guns to Ootmarsum. The following evening, Dutch engineers began advancing toward the city's southern ramparts, spending the time positioning two large siege guns. Meanwhile, on the north side, English troops and engineers did the same, bringing three artillery cannons into position. The next day in Ootmarsum, the new siege works were observed, and the incessant bombardment resumed on these newly dug positions.

Van den Sande soon realized his position was hopeless and with no hope of relief, he asked for the written terms of Maurice to be handed over. This time there was immediate capitulation, and the company of Spanish and German troops consisting of 120 men pulled out of the city, taking with them two banners, two guns, 800 pounds of gunpowder, 2000 fuses, four tons of flour, and other provisions. The written honors of war was that the garrison was to remain behind the Meuse for the allotted time of three months where they were not to engage in combat.

Dutch and English troops took over and Van Duivenvoorde ordered the fortifications and outer moat of Ootmarsum to be demolished as had been done in Enschede. At the same time, Maurice with the main army was busy with the siege of Oldenzaal which capitulated a day later.

== See also ==
- List of stadtholders in the Low Countries
- List of governors of the Spanish Netherlands
- Siege of Bredevoort (1597)
- Siege of Groenlo (1597)
