= Miss Kitty =

Miss Kitty may refer to:

- Miss Kitty, a ring name of professional wrestler Stacy Carter
- Miss Kitty, a fictional character in the animated film An American Tail: Fievel Goes West
- Miss Kitty, a fictional character in the radio and TV series Gunsmoke
- Miss Kitty, a sculpture by Paolo Schmidlin

== See also ==
- Miss Kittin (born 1973), musical performer
