= Ootmarsum =

- City
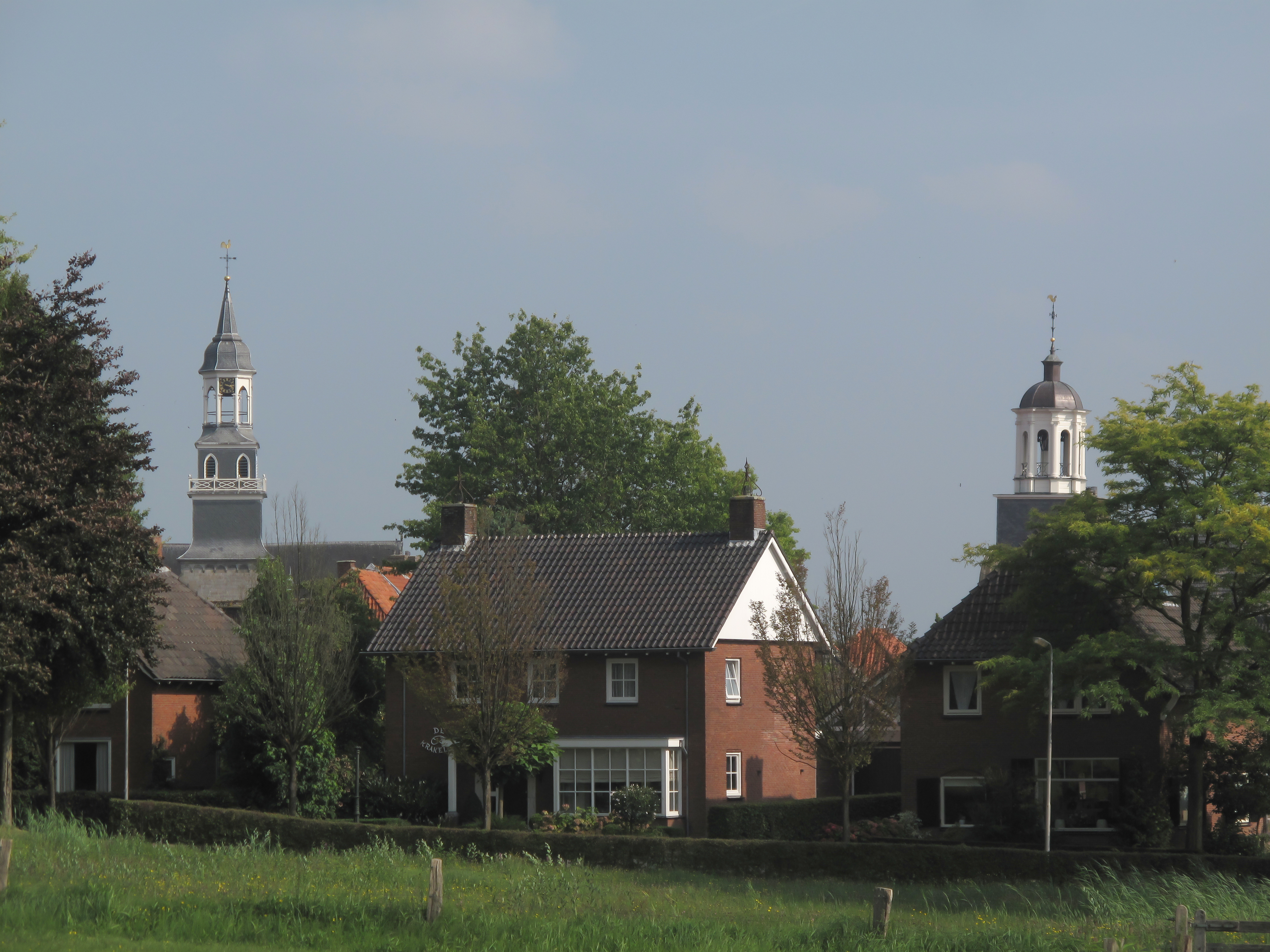
- Ootmarsum, view to the town

- Coat of arms
- Nickname: Siepelstad
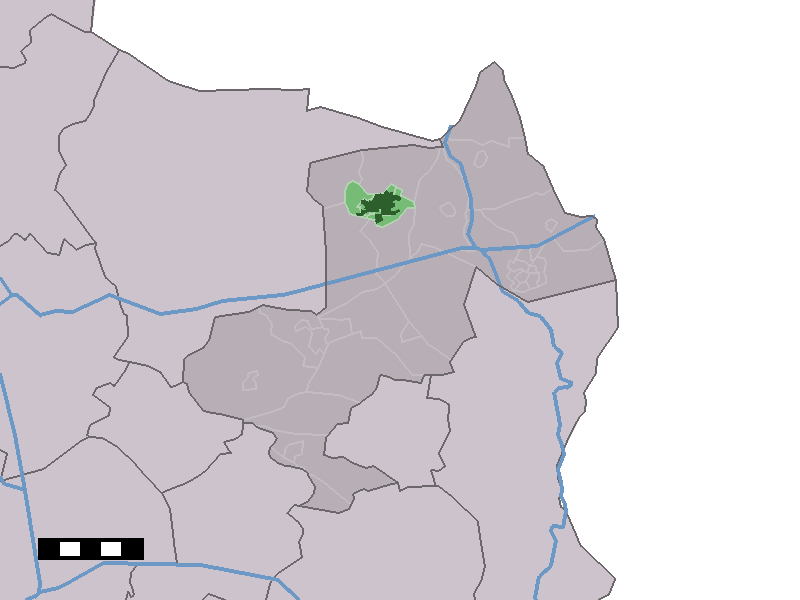
- The town centre (dark green) and the statistical district (light green) of Ootmarsum in the municipality of Dinkelland.

- Location in the Netherlands Ootmarsum (Netherlands)
- Coordinates: 52°24′26″N 6°53′58″E
- Country: Netherlands
- Province: Overijssel
- Municipality: Dinkelland

Population (2020)
  - Total: 4,460
- Demonym(s): Ootmarsumers, Siepeln
- Time zone: UTC+1 (CET)
  - Summer (DST): UTC+2 (CEST)

Ootmarsum (Dutch pronunciation: [oːtˈmɑrsʏm]) is a city in the Dutch province of Overijssel. It is a part of the municipality of Dinkelland, and lies about 10 km north of Oldenzaal.

In 2001, the city of Ootmarsum had 4227 inhabitants. The built-up area of the city was 1.5 km², and contained 1620 residences. The statistical area "Ootmarsum", which also can include the peripheral parts of the town, as well as the surrounding countryside, has a population of around 3650.

== History ==
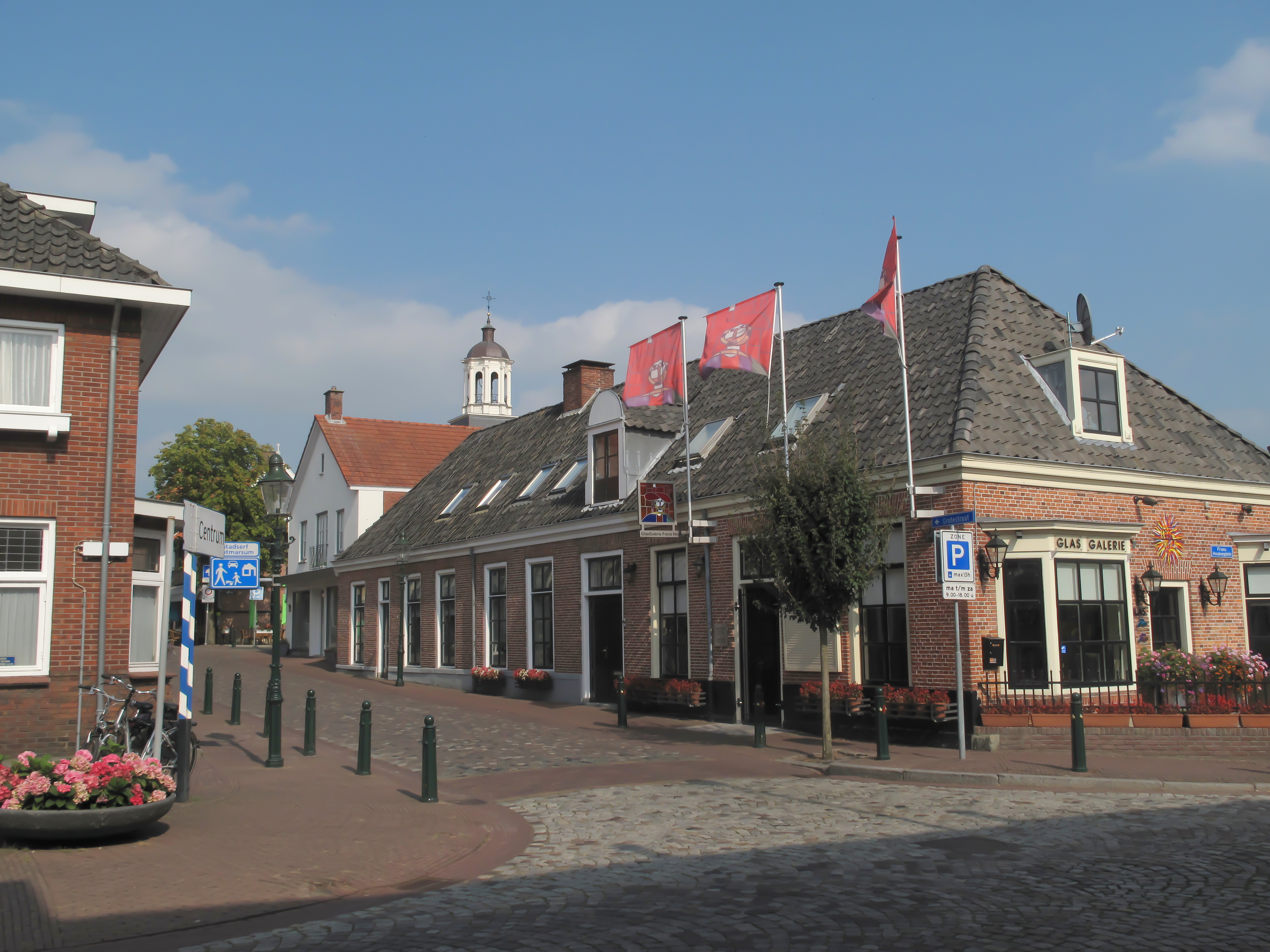
Ootmarsum, view to a street: Grotestraat-Almelosestraat

Around 770, one of the first churches of Twente was built in Ootmarsum. In November 917, Radboud, bishop of Utrecht, died in Ootmarsum. Around 1000, Ootmarsum was one of the largest parishes in Twente.

Ootmarsum received city rights in 1325. The town was then converted into a fortress with ditches and earthworks. In the 16th century Ootmarsum was occupied by the Spanish during the Eighty Years War but in 1597 was captured by Maurice, Prince of Orange. A cannonball from the siege can be seen today still embedded in the church.

Ootmarsum was a separate municipality until 2001, when it became a part of Dinkelland, together with Denekamp and Weerselo.

== Born in Ootmarsum ==
- Ton Schulten (1938), painter
- Han Polman (1963), politician
- Kitty Sanders (1980), retired volleyball player
- Tom Veelers (1984), retired professional road bicycle racer

== Gallery ==
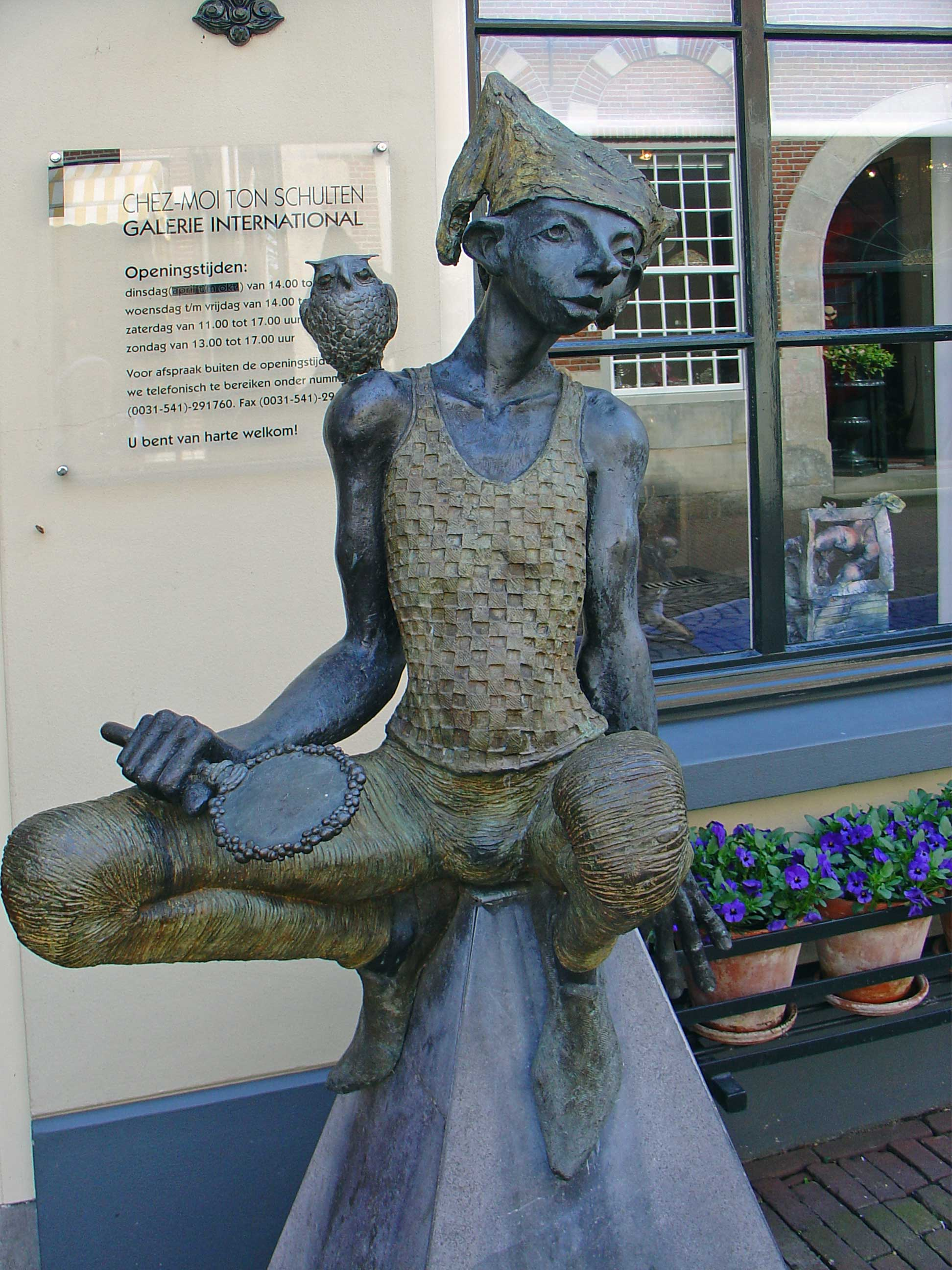
Till Eulenspiegel

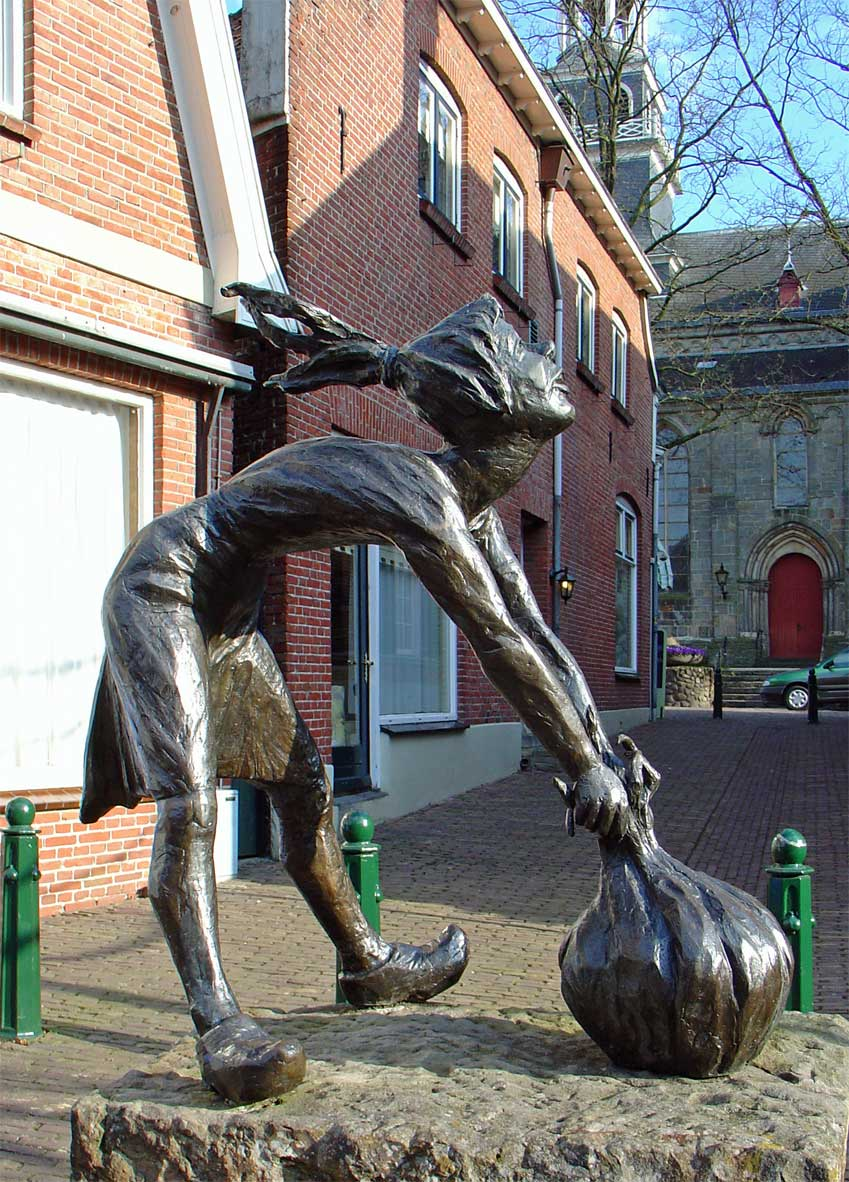
Sjalotje pulls out the siepel, symbol of carnival in Ootmarsum.

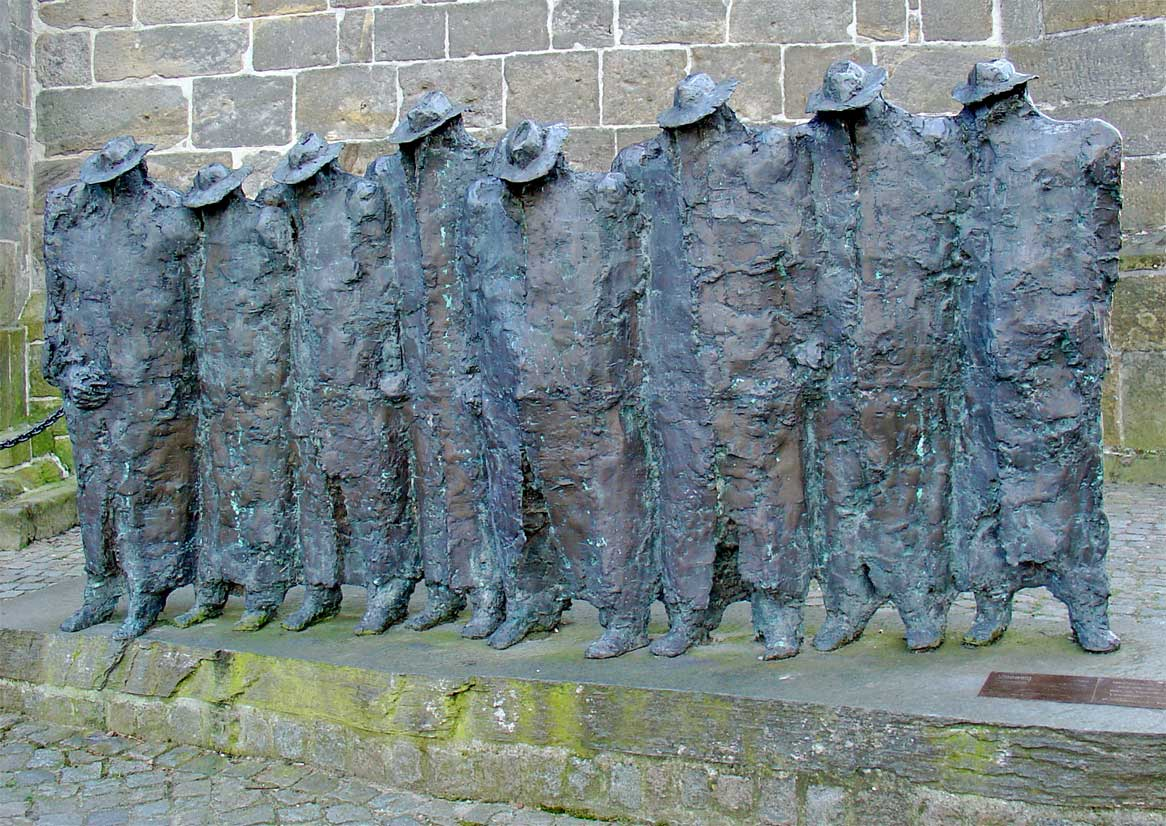
"Poaskearls" (Easter Men), referring to local Easter rituals in Ootmarsum.
