= Kity =

Kity may refer to:

- KITY (102.9 FM) Llano, Texas, USA
- KITY-FM 92.9, former callsign of San Antonio, Texas, USA radio station FM 92.9 KROM

== Other uses ==
- K.K.Kity (Japanese band)

== See also ==
- Dąbrowa-Kity, a village in north-eastern Poland
- Kitty (disambiguation)
