= The Daily Service =

British religious radio programme

- Genre: Religious
- Running time: 15 minutes
- Country of origin: United Kingdom
- Language: English
- Home station: BBC Radio 4 Extra
- Original release: January 1928
- Website: Daily Service

The Daily Service is a short Christian service broadcast every weekday morning between 09:45 and 10:00 on BBC Radio 4 Extra.

== History ==
In 1926, British novelist Kitty Cordeux began a persistent letter-writing campaign urging the BBC to broadcast daily Christian religious services on the radio. The result was The Daily Service, beginning in 1928 and continuing to the present day. Her campaign was documented in the BBC Radio 4 documentary The Lady Behind the Daily Service (2005). Originally aired from Savoy Hill and then Broadcasting House, the service was moved on the outbreak of war in 1939, first to Bristol and later to the Trinity Chapel of St Paul's Church, Bedford, under the musical direction of Dr George Thalben-Ball. In 1945 the service returned to a studio in Broadcasting House.

For many years, The Daily Service was broadcast live from All Souls Church, Langham Place, the church adjacent to Broadcasting House. In 1993, when the Religion and Ethics department of the BBC moved to Manchester, its new base became Emmanuel Church, Didsbury, a suburb in south Manchester. In 2017, live services moved from Emmanuel Church Didsbury to MediaCityUK in Salford, using the Philharmonic Studio, MPAS studio or a radio studio in Dock House. This move was driven by cost and logistical issues, and was facilitated by the installation of an electronic organ in the Philharmonic Studio. Since 2018, live choirs and music groups have often been replaced by specially pre-recorded segments, again for logistical reasons and to make cost savings. From the start of the Covid-19 pandemic in March 2020, presenters pre-recorded the services remotely several days in advance, and music was provided by commercial CDs. In the post-pandemic era, the programme has continued to be made in this way due to reduced budgets. The service of today combines hymns, prayers and reflections by a variety of ministers and laypeople, and has evolved to reflect the range of contemporary worship styles in the UK.

The Daily Service was first transmitted on 2 January 1928, though not listed in the Radio Times until 16 January. Until 30 June 1928, it was broadcast under the title A Short Religious Service.

== Transmission ==
Until 13 September 1991 it was broadcast on all BBC Radio 4's FM frequencies, apart from when Schools programmes were being broadcast in its timeslot on FM. However the 1991 schedule revamp saw the programme only being aired on long wave. This continued until 29 March 2024 which was Good Friday that year. At this point it moved to digital station BBC Radio 4 Extra as part of the ending of separate Radio 4 programmes on FM and long wave.

The programme will move to BBC Local Radio and BBC Sounds in spring 2027 and will be broadcast several hours earlier than before at 05.45. This is as a result of the upcoming closure of BBC Radio 4 Extra.
