= Kiten =

Kiten may refer to:

- Kiten, Burgas Province, a resort town on the Bulgarian Black Sea Coast
- Kiten, Varna Province, a village in Varna Province, Bulgaria
- Kiten (program), a Japanese Kanji learning tool

== See also ==
- Kitten (disambiguation)
