= Alured Clarke =

British Army officer and colonial administrator

Field Marshal Sir Alured Clarke GCB
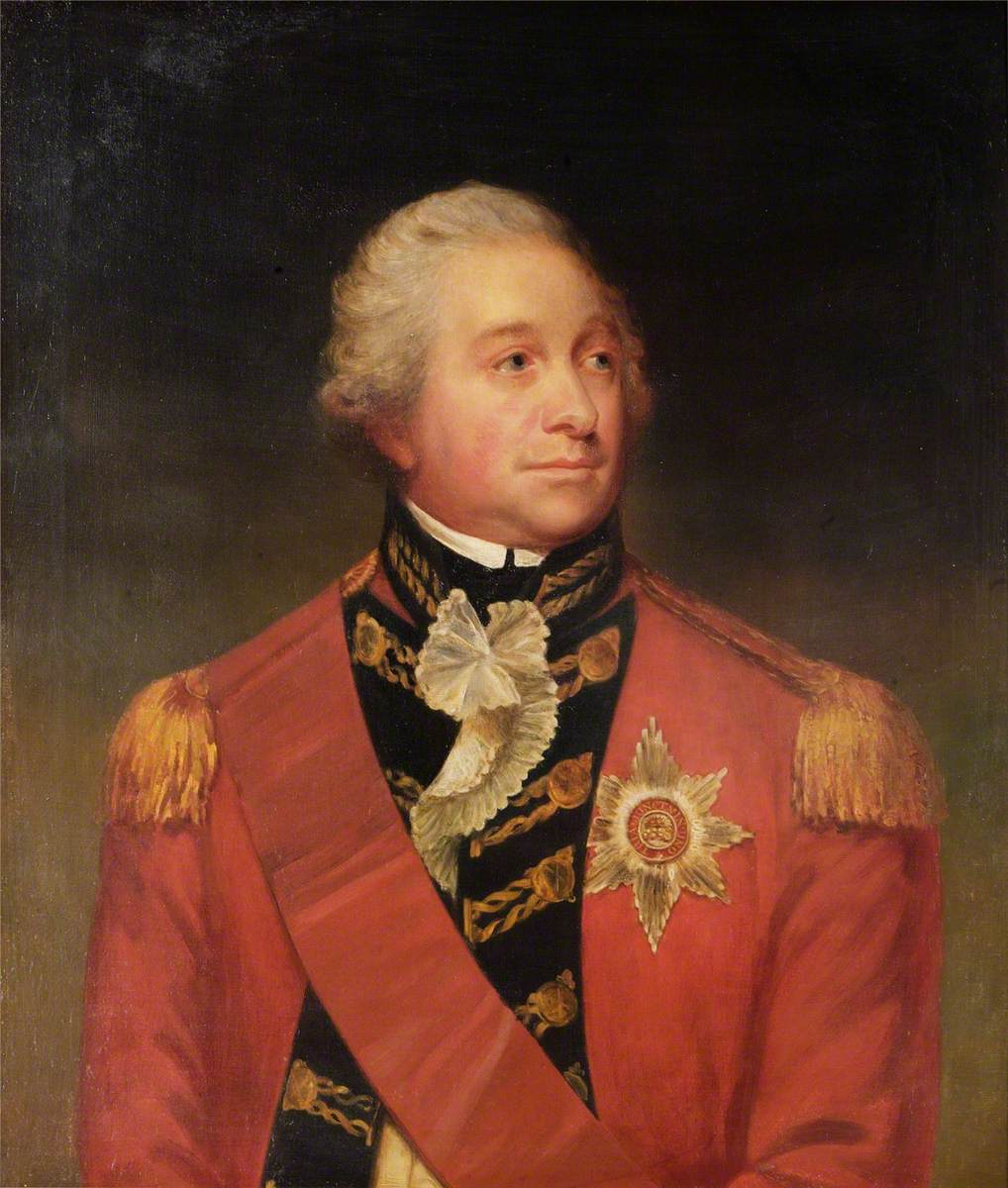
- Portrait attributed to Sir William Beechey

Acting Governor-General of the Presidency of Fort William
- In office 1797–1798
- Monarch: George III
- Preceded by: Sir John Shore
- Succeeded by: The Earl of Mornington

Personal details
- Born: 24 November 1744 Britain
- Died: 16 September 1832 (aged 87) Llangollen, Wales
- Awards: Knight Grand Cross of the Order of the Bath

Military service
- Allegiance: Great Britain; United Kingdom
- Branch/service: British Army
- Years of service: 1759–1832
- Rank: Field marshal
- Unit: 50th Regiment of Foot; 52nd Regiment of Foot; 54th Regiment of Foot
- Commands: 60th Regiment of Foot; 68th Regiment of Foot; 5th Regiment of Foot; 7th Regiment of Foot
- Battles/wars: Seven Years' War; American War of Independence; French Revolutionary Wars; Invasion of the Cape Colony; Fourth Anglo-Mysore War

Field Marshal Sir Alured Clarke GCB (24 November 1744 – 16 September 1832) was a British Army officer and colonial administrator. He took charge of all British troops in Georgia in May 1780 and was then deployed to Philadelphia to supervise the evacuation of British prisoners of war at the closing stages of the American Revolutionary War. Clarke went on to serve as governor of Jamaica and then lieutenant-governor of Lower Canada in which role he had responsibility for implementing the Constitutional Act 1791. He was then sent to India where he became Commander-in-Chief of the Madras Army, then briefly Governor-General of the Presidency of Fort William during the Fourth Anglo-Mysore War.

== Military career ==
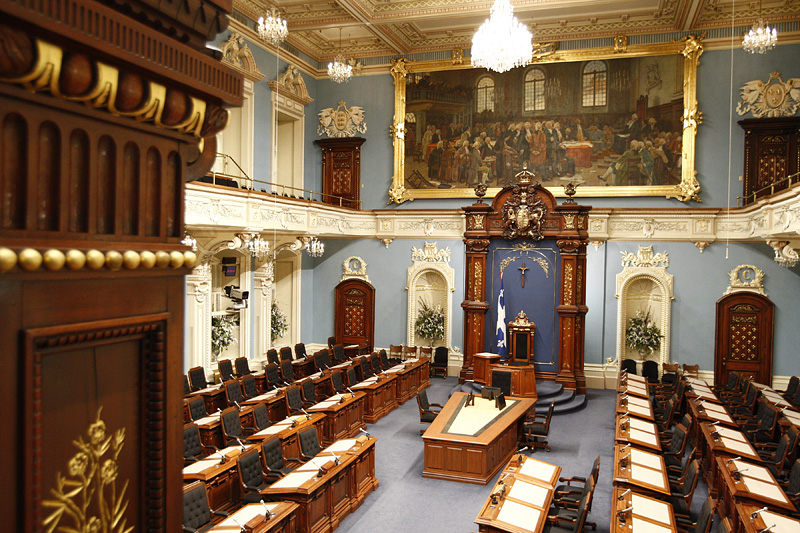
The National Assembly of Quebec, formerly the Parliament of Lower Canada, first convened by Sir Alured Clarke in December 1792 (the painting in the background depicts one of the first sittings of the Parliament of Lower Canada in January 1793)

Born the son of Charles Clarke (c.1702–1750) and Jane Clarke (née Mullins), Alured Clarke was educated at Eton College and was commissioned as an ensign in the 50th Regiment of Foot on 20 March 1759. Later that year he served in Germany under the Marquess of Granby as part of the Seven Years' War. Promoted to lieutenant in the 50th Foot on 10 May 1760 and captain in the 52nd Regiment of Foot on 30 December 1763, he transferred to the 5th Regiment of Foot, stationed in Ireland, in January 1767 and was then promoted to major in the 54th Regiment of Foot in 1771.

Promoted to lieutenant colonel and given command of the 7th Regiment of Foot, serving in America, on 13 May 1777, Clarke took charge of all British troops in Georgia in May 1780 and, having been promoted to colonel on 16 May 1782, he was then deployed to Philadelphia to supervise the evacuation of British prisoners of war in May 1783.

Clarke became governor of Jamaica in summer 1784. Promoted to major general on 1 May 1790, he acquitted himself well enough as governor of Jamaica that he was recommended to George III as a suitable person to become Lieutenant Governor of Lower Canada in October 1790. In the absence of the governor general of British North America, who had departed for England in August 1791, he took command of British forces and set about implementing the Constitutional Act 1791 which involved settling geographical boundaries (between Lower Canada and the United States and between Lower Canada and the rest of Canada), offering land to settlers and convening the first legislature of the Province. Clarke served as lieutenant-governor of Lower Canada until Summer 1793, when the Governor returned to Canada and Clarke could return to England.

Clarke was sent to India in 1795 with instructions to interrupt his voyage at the Cape of Good Hope where he and his force carried out a successful invasion of the Cape Colony and then spent the next two months on arranging administrative matters before proceeding to India. On arrival in India in early 1796 he became Commander-in-Chief of the Madras Army. He was promoted to the acting rank of lieutenant-general on 3 May 1796 and, having been appointed a Knight Companion of the Order of the Bath on 14 January 1797, he was promoted to the substantive rank of lieutenant-general on 4 February 1797.

He became acting Governor-General of the Presidency of Fort William in March 1798, in which capacity he also served as acting Commander-in-Chief of the Bengal Army. Although Clarke was not present at the siege of Seringapatam in April 1799, his army was victorious thereby successfully concluding the Fourth Anglo-Mysore War. He returned to England in March 1801 and was promoted to general on 11 May 1802. Following a re-organisation of the order, he was advanced to Knight Grand Cross of the Order of the Bath on 4 January 1815.

In 1803 he appeared, alongside Horatio Nelson and Sir Evan Nepean, as a character witness in the treason trial of Colonel Edward Despard. Together they testified to Despard's service in the Caribbean. Clarke also served as honorary colonel of the 1st Battalion of the 60th Regiment of Foot, of the 68th Regiment of Foot, of the 5th Regiment of Foot and then of the 7th Regiment of Foot. In retirement, Clarke lived at Mansfield Street in London. He was promoted to field marshal on 22 July 1830 in the runup to the coronation of William IV, which happened on 9 September 1831. He died at Llangollen in Wales on 16 September 1832 while visiting his niece.

== Family ==
Clarke married Elizabeth Catherine Hunter in 1770, who eight years earlier had eloped with the married Earl of Pembroke. Kitty had a son by Pembroke, and received a pension from him until 1790, but Clarke and she had no children.

== Sources ==
- Heathcote, Tony (1999). The British Field Marshals, 1736–1997: A Biographical Dictionary. Barnsley: Leo Cooper. ISBN 0-85052-696-5.

Government offices
Preceded by Archibald Campbell	Governor of Jamaica; 1784–1790	Succeeded by The Earl of Effingham
Military offices
Preceded by Thomas Dundas	Colonel of the 68th (Durham) Regiment of Foot; 1794	Succeeded by Charles Stuart
Preceded by Prince Edward, Duke of Kent and Strathearn	Colonel of the 7th Regiment of Foot (Royal Fuzileers); 1801–1832	Succeeded by Sir Edward Blakeney
Preceded by John Braithwaite	C-in-C, Madras Army; 1796–1797	Succeeded by George Harris
Government offices
Preceded by Sir John Shore	Governor-General of the Presidency of Fort William, acting 1798	Succeeded by The Earl of Mornington
