= Kitty Kuse =

German lesbian rights activist (1904–1999)

- Born: Hedwig Emma Käthe Kuse; 17 March 1904; Schöneberg
- Died: 7 November 1999 (aged 95); Berlin, Germany
- Occupations: Lesbian rights activist and writer
- Employer: UKZ – Unsere kleine Zeitung

Hedwig Emma Käthe "Kitty" Kuse (17 March 1904 – 7 November 1999) was a German writer and activist for lesbian emancipation in Germany after World War II. She founded the first group for older lesbian women and was the founder, editor and author of the monthly magazine UKZ – Unsere kleine Zeitung.

== Life ==
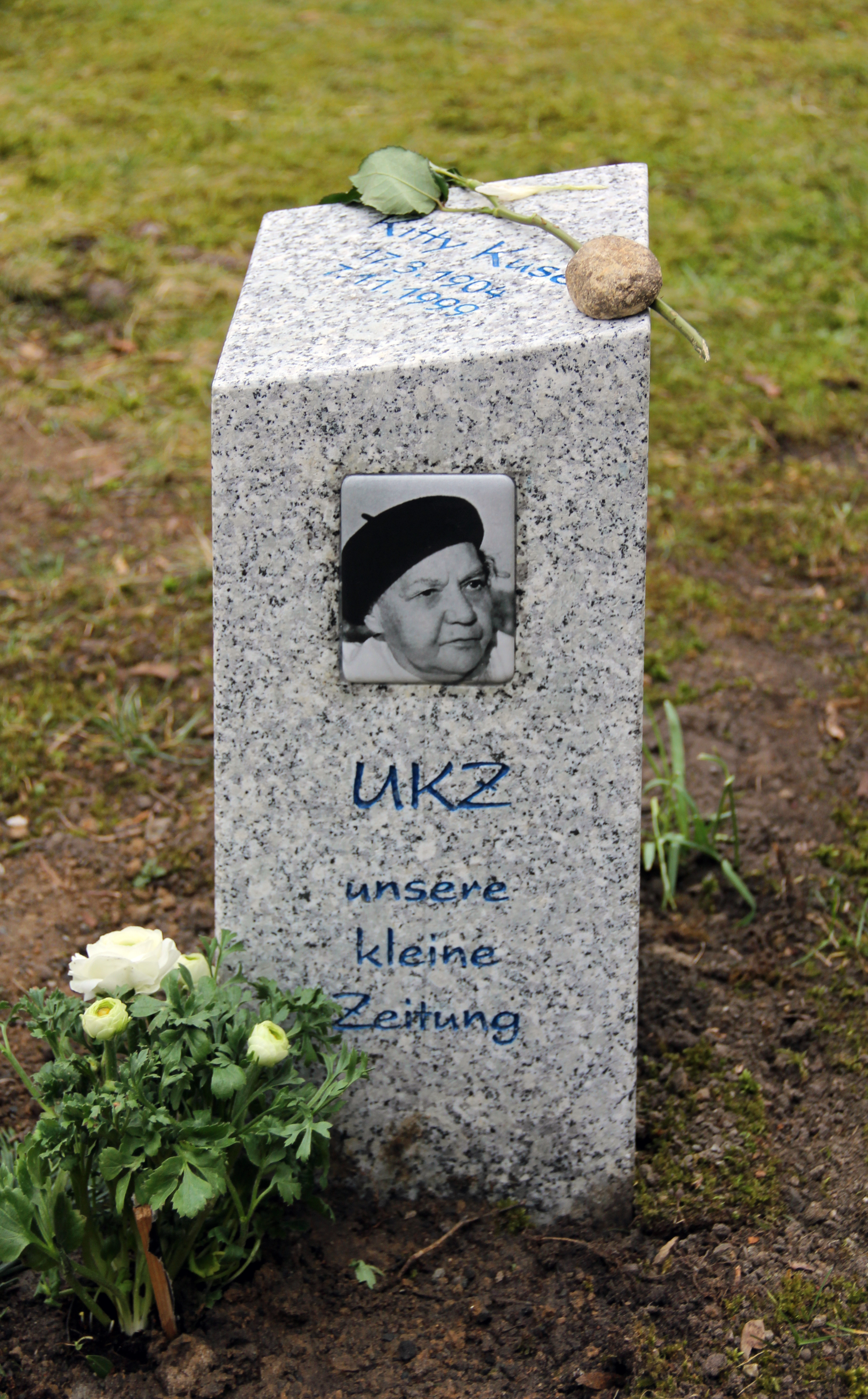
Memorial stone for Kitty Kuse in the Old St. Matthew's Churchyard in Berlin

Kitty Kuse grew up in a politically left-wing working-class milieu in Berlin Schöneberg. After elementary school and vocational training, she worked as a commercial employee.

During the National Socialist era, Kitty Kuse did not join the NSDAP and did not belong to any Nazi organization. She was unemployed for a long time and later worked as a punch operator on the assembly line. She hid her sexual identity and considered adopting a male first name. A doctor from Magnus Hirschfeld's Institute for Sexual Science advised her not to do so, so that she would not be on record with the Nazis. She supported lesbians who were persecuted as Jews. She brought Gertrude Sandmann food across Berlin to the hiding place. After the World War II, she lived in East Berlin, completed her A-levels and studied economics.

Before the Berlin Wall was built, she moved to West Berlin with her partner. In the 1950s and 1960s, lesbian sexuality was not a punishable offense, "but the repression that existed under National Socialism against any lifestyle that did not correspond to the classic family image and the ideal of the housewife marriage continued. Women who loved women were subjected to massive pressure to marry, which forced them to lead a double life and to deny their sexual orientation. The taboo had such an effect that even today the words 'lesbian' or 'Lesbe' are hardly pronounceable for witnesses of this time." In the feminist movement of the 1970s, the name "lesbian" was re-evaluated from a discriminatory to a positive, resistant term.

Kuse founded the group "L 74" together with other women in November 1974. "L" stood for Lesbos, "74" for the founding year. In the group, older working or retired women initially met in the rooms of Homosexuelle Aktion Westberlin (HAW). Some of them had become acquainted with lesbian culture during the Weimar era. It was the first association of older lesbians whose realities of life differed from those of younger women in the movement. Gertrude Sandmann and her partner Tamara Streck were among the occasional collaborators. From February 1975, Kuse published the group's small-format monthly magazine UKZ – Unsere kleine Zeitung, which existed until 2001. Sandmann's drawing Liebende illustrated the cover for years. The publication was intended to help make homophobia and sexism visible in society and encourage lesbian women to step out of isolation.

Kuse died in Berlin, aged 95.

== Legacy ==
Kitty Kuse was never a femme fatale and yet she lived beyond all conventions. She had relationships with women from the age of 16 and yet never had contact with the dazzling subculture of the Weimar era ... Kitty Kuse managed the feat of swimming with the tide and yet living against the grain.

— Ilse Kokula

On the commemoration of Kuse's 112th birthday, a memorial stone for her was laid as part of the 160th anniversary of the Alter St.-Matthäus-Kirchhof, Berlin, and the Berlin Women's March in 2016, to commemorate the pioneer of the lesbian movement. Eva Rieger and Christiane von Lengerke paid tribute to her life. In June 2017, a green space in Berlin-Schöneberg was named Kitty-Kuse-Platz.

== Documentary film ==
- Tille Ganz: Kitty Kuse, portrait film, 45 min, 1985/94
