= Kitty Lai (Hong Kong artist) =

Hong Kong actress

Lai Kuan I (Chinese: 黎寬怡), better known as Kitty Lai is a Hong Kong artist, actress, and model. She is contracted with TVB.

== Summary ==
Lai Kuan-I has a younger sister who grew up in a housing estate in Kowloon. She studied at The Church of Christ in China Heep Woh College (Form 6, 2013), and studied at the Technological and Higher Education Institute of Hong Kong (Fashion Design) course and obtained an Honours Bachelor of Arts degree. She signed up for the 2017 Miss Hong Kong Pageant, yielding an interview opportunity.

That year she applied for TVB's 29th Artist Training Class and officially became an artist under the company in April of the following year. She also worked part-time as a print model. In 2018, she joined the station's news program Scoop as a field host; in January 2019, during "The Learning Curve of a Warlord" victory celebration party, she suddenly cried while interviewing Dicky Cheung and attracted audience attention. In April of the same year, during the "2019 Asia's Most Influential Awards Ceremony", she suddenly burst into tears during an interview with Ron Ng, Bosco Wong, Joe Ma and Nancy Wu. In early 2020, during an interview at the set of "Hong Kong Love Stories" (香港愛情故事), she praised the interviewee Cecilia Yip Tung for her elegance.
