= Kitty Crimes =

American musician

Midas MSL, who goes by the stage name Kitty Crimes, is an American music producer and performance artist in the Denver, Colorado area. They are also the editor of a streetwear clothing line.

== Early career ==
In 2011, MSL adopted the stage name Kitty Crimes. They received recognition for their rap song "Find a Penny" (directed by Jess Paul), which achieved some viral success in 2012.

MSL soon began incorporating hip hop and R&B influences into their music. They won Westword's best "Hip Hop (Solo)" award in 2017. Their EP, Crimes of the Kitty, Vol. 2, was released in April 2018, Critics considered the album as notable for its eclectic styling and thoughtful beat constructions.

In 2018, MSL was listed as one of "14 Colorado LGBTQ Musicians You Should Know" by 303 Magazine. Autostraddle called them "one of 10 incredible queer and trans artists to get you ready for summer".

== Personal life ==
MSL is non-binary and uses they/them pronouns.
