= Kitty Donaldson =

British political journalist and commentator

Kitty Donaldson is a British political journalist and commentator who has reported from Westminster since the early 2000s. She is the Chief Political Commentator at The i Paper, and previously spent nearly 18 years at Bloomberg News as UK Political Correspondent and later Political Editor. Her work is known for its analytical, non‑partisan approach to explaining government policy and political developments.

== Education ==
Donaldson has a degree from Durham University.

== Career ==
Donaldson began her journalism career in the early 2000s, working as a freelance writer for UK newspapers including The Independent. She later worked as a diary reporter for the Evening Standard, gaining early experience in London's political and media environment.

From 2003 to 2006, Donaldson was a political reporter for ITV, covering Westminster and conducting interviews with ministers and MPs.

Donaldson joined Bloomberg News in 2006 as UK Political Correspondent. Over more than 15 years, she covered general elections, leadership contests, Brexit, and major shifts in UK governance. In 2021 she was appointed Political Editor, overseeing political coverage and editorial direction.

In May 2024, Donaldson became Chief Political Commentator at The i Paper. Her work focuses on analysis of government decisions, international relations and parliamentary developments.

== Personal life ==
She is now based in London.
