= Paolo Schmidlin =

Italian sculptor (born 1964)

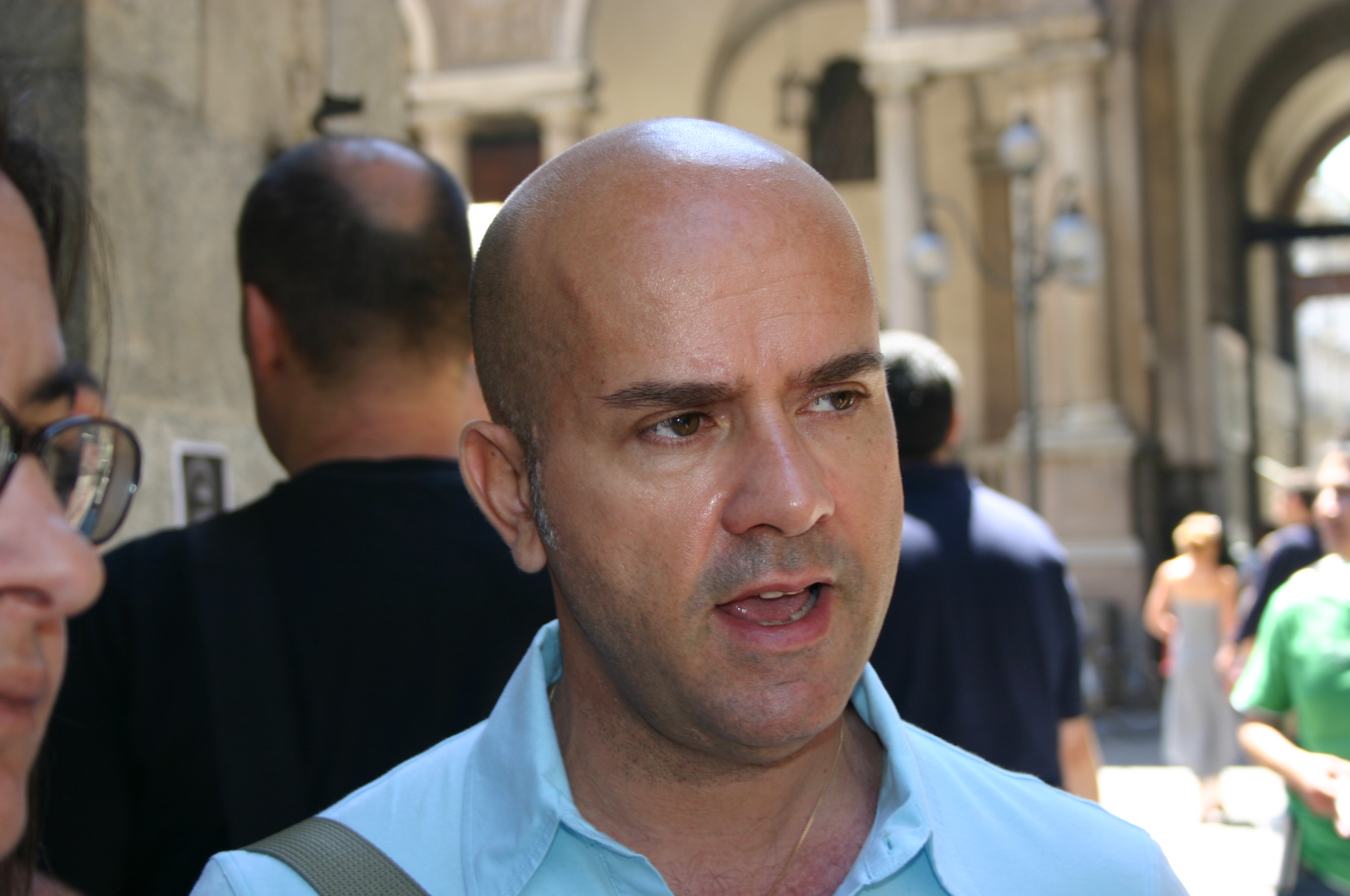
Paolo Schmidlin, 14 July 2007

Paolo Schmidlin (born 1964 in Milan) is an Italian sculptor. A graduate from the Brera Academy, Schmidlin lives and works in Milan.

Schmidlin's work has courted controversy and censorship, particularly Miss Kitty, a depiction of Pope Benedict XVI partially clothed and wearing women's underwear. The piece was supposed to be part of an exhibition in Italy at a 2007 gay pride event in Milan, but was removed from display. It had gained the attention of the Catholic Anti-Defamation League who called it "a vulgar offence" and threatened legal action if it featured in the event. Schmidlin's portfolio also includes a depiction of Marilyn Monroe on her deathbed, a photograph of which has been mistaken as a true image of Monroe.
