= Koshechka =

Kitten (Кошечка)
- Directed by: Viktor Minakhin
- Written by: Nikolai Konstantinov
- Produced by: Department of Educational and Scientific Photography & Cinematography, Moscow State University
- Cinematography: V. Zhurkin
- Animation by: V. Ponomarenko
- Release date: 1968
- Running time: 1 minute 24 seconds
- Country: Soviet Union
- Language: Russian

Kitten (Russian: Кошечка, Koshechka) is a 1968 Soviet computer animation short film, one of the earliest examples of its kind. Produced using the BESM-4 computer, it features a realistic silhouette of a cat and was created as a technical demonstration of computational animation possibilities.

== Plot ==
The film depicts the movement of a cat's silhouette in a lifelike manner, serving primarily as a showcase of early digital animation techniques.

== Technical features ==
The frames were generated by printing onto paper using the alphanumeric printing device ACPU-128. A professional hand-drawn animator then transferred these frames onto film. The first frames (seen before the credits) were hand-drawn by the animator to depict the cat arching its back, making faces, and blinking.

The cat's movement was modeled using second-order differential equations, likely the first instance of this technique being applied to computer animation. The equations were developed by Viktor Minakhin, based on his own quadrupedal movement and muscle coordination (he walked on all fours and observed his own muscle sequence).

A key innovation was representing the 3D animated object as a hierarchical data structure akin to an octree. Similar techniques were rediscovered in Western animation only in the 1980s, though biomechanical motion calculations existed earlier, dating back to the 1970s. Unlike later physics-based animations, the equations were designed "by eye" to replicate typical feline gait. Despite this, the realism impressed experts like Rick Parent, author of Computer Animation: Algorithms and Technologies.

== Production history ==
Development began in Alexander Kronrod's lab at the Institute for Theoretical and Experimental Physics. After Kronrod signed the Letter of the Ninety-Nine, the lab was shut down. The team relocated first to the Institute for Problems in Information Transmission and later to Moscow Pedagogical State University, while frame production continued at Moscow State University's Department of Scientific Cinematography.

When rendering the film on different BESM-4 machines across various institutes, the creators encountered issues with incompatible machine codes, requiring them to make on-the-fly adjustments to the program.

The premiere took place at Moscow State University, and Konstantinov later screened it in school lectures. In 1974, the journal Problems of Cybernetics published a detailed account of the film's creation process.

== See also ==
- ASCII art
- Procedural animation
