= Kitty Calavita =

American criminologist

Kitty C. Calavita is an American criminologist, focusing on sociology of law, criminology, immigration, criminal justice and inequality. Her research has spanned five books, many articles focusing on national and international social reform and police reform for the city of Berkeley, California.

Calavita is a Chancellor's Professor Emerita at University of California, Irvine, an Elected Fellow of the American Academy of Political and Social Science, former Police Reform Commission chair and former board member of Berkeley's Police Accountability Board.

== Published work ==
Her first book, "Inside the State: The Bracero Program, Immigration and the INS." (1992) analyzed Mexican labor in the United States after World War II. The book explores the Bracero Program where Calavita identifies why it did not succeed.

Calavita's second book in 1997 was co-authored by Henry Pontell and Robert Tillman called "Big Money Crime: Fraud and Politics in Savings and Loan Crisis." This book examines the financial crisis of the 1980s and went on to win the Albert Reiss Jr. Award for Distinguished Scholarship from the American Sociological Association's Crime, Law and Deviance section.

"Immigrants at the Margins: Law, Race and Exclusion in Southern Europe" published in 2005 and is Calavita's third book. The book investigates how laws in Spain and Italy exploit immigrant workers while trying to stress integration. Calavita concludes that these laws oppose each other and that is reflected in the political economy of the countries.

The fourth and Calavita's second solo book, "Invitation to Law and Society: An Introduction to the Study of Real Law" published in 2010. This book helped simplify what it means to be a criminologist and how law interacts with more than the judicial system and into the institutional structure of people's lives. It also dives into law's role in making social change in the United States.

Calavita's fifth book, "Appealing to Justice: Prisoner Grievances, Rights and Carceral Logic" published in 2015 studies the daily life inside California prisons.

== Policy reform ==
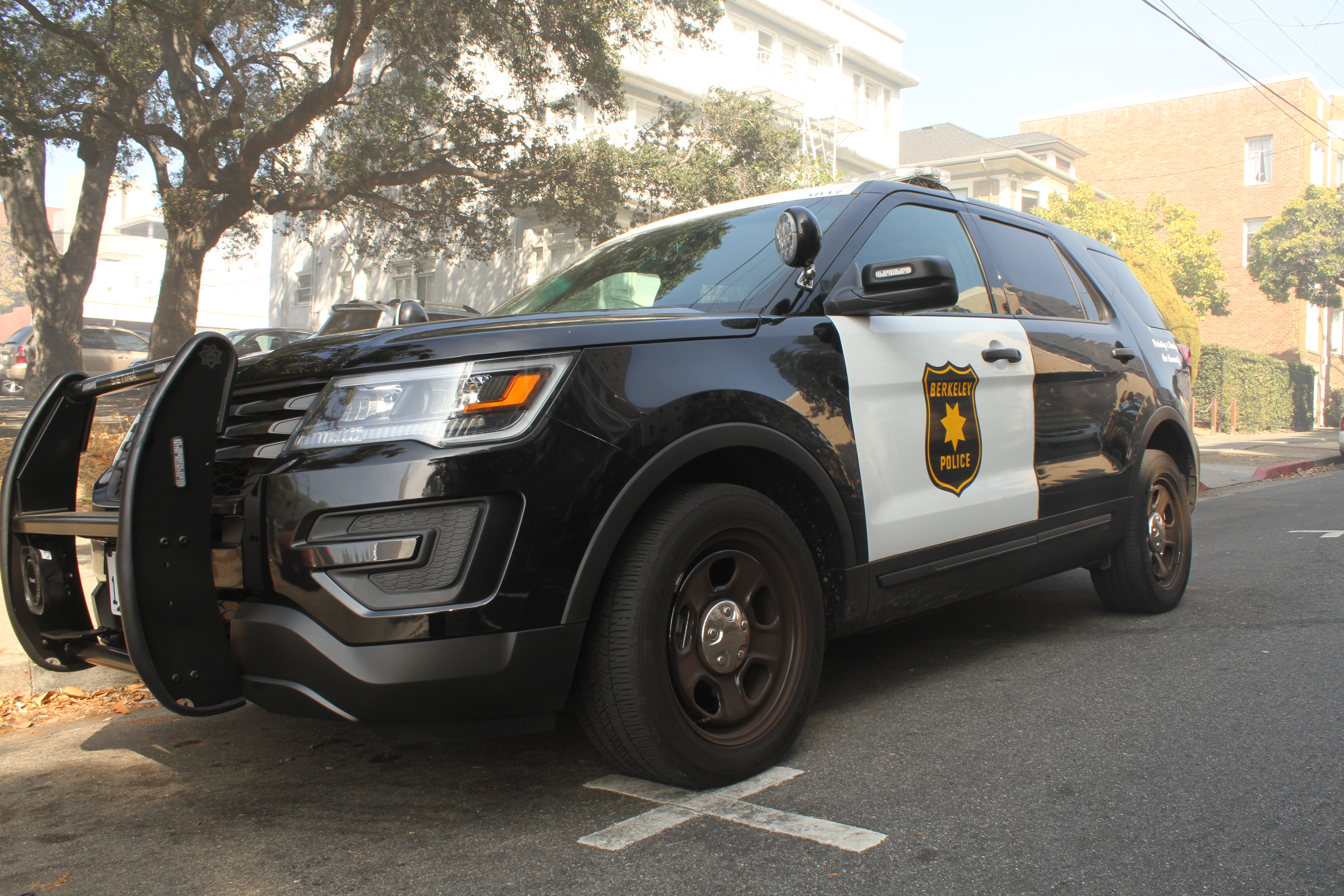
Berkeley California police car

After Calavita retired from UCI and finished her fifth book, she continued advocating for police reform and review as chair for the Berkeley Police Review Commission beginning in 2017.

The Police Review Commission was established in 1973, as the first civilian oversight commission, and continued until November 2020 when 85% of Berkeley citizens voted to amend the PRC into the Police Accountability Board. The PRC and the PAB work with the Berkeley City Council and the Berkeley Police Department to analyze and reform policies such as the police's ability to search those under supervised release and the police's use of force.

The PAB held its first meeting in July 2021 and Calavita stayed on the board until January 2026, when Calavita and former board member Juliet Leftwich announced their resignation. Calavita and Leftwich said in their resignation that their work on police reform in the PRC was being reversed and their counsel on cautionary approval for a security system, which had leaked data to Immigration and Customs Enforcement, was disregarded. "Having served on both the PRC and the PAB, however, we have seen firsthand that the PAB has not been permitted to exercise its expanded oversight authority and is even less empowered than its predecessor," Calavita and Leftwich wrote.

== Awards ==
Since 1999, Kitty Calavita won the Sociology of Law's Distinguished Article Awards from the American Sociological Association. The articles include:

"Immigration, Law, and Marginalization in the Global Economy: Notes from Spain" in 1999 from the University of California Irvine.

"Inside the Pyramid of Disputes: Naming Problems and Filing Grievances in California Prisons," co-authored by Kitty Calavita and Valerie Jenness published in 2013 from the University of California Irvine.

"It Depends on the Outcome: Prisoners, Grievances, and Perceptions of Justice," was co-authored by Kitty Calavita and Valerie Jenness. It received a 2019 honorable mention for the article .
