= Kitty Sanders =

Dutch volleyball player (born 1980)

Personal information
- Nationality: Dutch
- Born: 4 April 1980 (age 46); Ootmarsum
- Height: 186 cm (6 ft 1 in)
- Spike: 305 cm (120 in)
- Block: 293 cm (115 in)

Volleyball information
- Number: 11 (national team)

National team
1998	Netherlands

Kitty Sanders (born 4 April 1980) is a retired Dutch female volleyball player.

She was part of the Netherlands women's national volleyball team at the 1998 FIVB Volleyball Women's World Championship in Japan.
