= Kittie Roberts =

British artist (1885–1970)

- Born: Katherine Low; 13 December 1885
- Died: 7 May 1970 (aged 84)
- Known for: Painting and printmaking
- Spouse: Edward Roberts (mar. 1919, div. 1930)

Katherine Roberts (née Low, 1885–1970), generally known as Kittie Roberts, was a British painter and artist best known for her strikingly vibrant linocuts.

== Biography ==
Kittie Roberts was born to an English family in 1885. The Roberts Family was well respected, and Katherine enjoyed a comfortable upbringing before - according to family lore - spending an extended period of time studying in Paris, around 1910.

In 1915, Roberts married Captain Reginald Raynor Nye. Tragically, however, Nye was killed by a German sniper within a few weeks of returning to the Western Front, not long after they were married. Roberts remarried in 1919, to Edwin (Edward) Angas Roberts, assuming his surname when she did. The couple divorced in 1930, and Roberts married a third time to Edgar Kershaw Middleton in 1932.

Kittie Roberts died in 1970.

== Influences ==
Kittie Roberts is best known for her dynamic linocuts, which draw on popular Art Deco trends in Britain at the time.

Her famous print, The Switchback (1933), was influence by the advent of the weekend in the early 1930s. The increase in leisure time saw a rise in the popularity of fairgrounds and other recreational spaces, and the vitality of these environments provided ideal subject matter for artists seeking to capture elements of contemporary life.

Another of Roberts' artworks, The Seven Veils (1932), draws on the biblical story of Salome, which was occupying the attention of current audiences due to the story's appearance in the writings of Oscar Wilde and a recent performance by the Ballets Russes.

== Exhibitions ==
The work of Kittie Roberts has been exhibited in several recent exhibitions, including the Modern Women: Flight of Time exhibition hosted by Auckland Art Gallery Toi o Tāmaki (2024–2025). This exhibition celebrated the formative role that women artists have played in the evolution of modern art in Aotearoa New Zealand, and explored the artists' passionate responses to their changing society. Alongside Kittie Roberts, the exhibition featured a range of both well-known and more obscure women artists from 1920 to 1970, including Rita Angus, Flora Scales, Pauline Yearbury, and Frances Hodgkins.

Kittie Roberts' work was also exhibited in One O'Clock Jump: British Linocuts from the Jazz Age (December 2024 - May 2025), hosted by Christchurch Art Gallery Te Puna o Waiwhetū. This exhibition celebrated linocut printmaking as a remarkable development in the art world of the 1920s and 1930s. Described by the gallery as "the perfect medium for conveying the fast-changing world of speeding motor vehicles, industry, city life and sport, as well as more traditional pastoral subjects," this exhibition celebrated the artform's vibrancy and versatility in both a historical and modern context.

Previously to these, the artist's work was displayed in the first exhibition of British linocuts at Nan Kivells' Redfern Gallery in 1929, arranged by Claude Flight, and again in a 1932 exhibition entitled Modern Colour Prints.
