= Kitty Hunter =

English noblewoman (1740-1795)

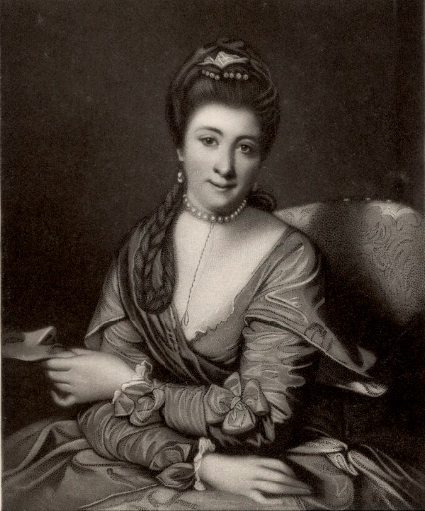
An 1865 engraving of Reynolds' 1763 painting

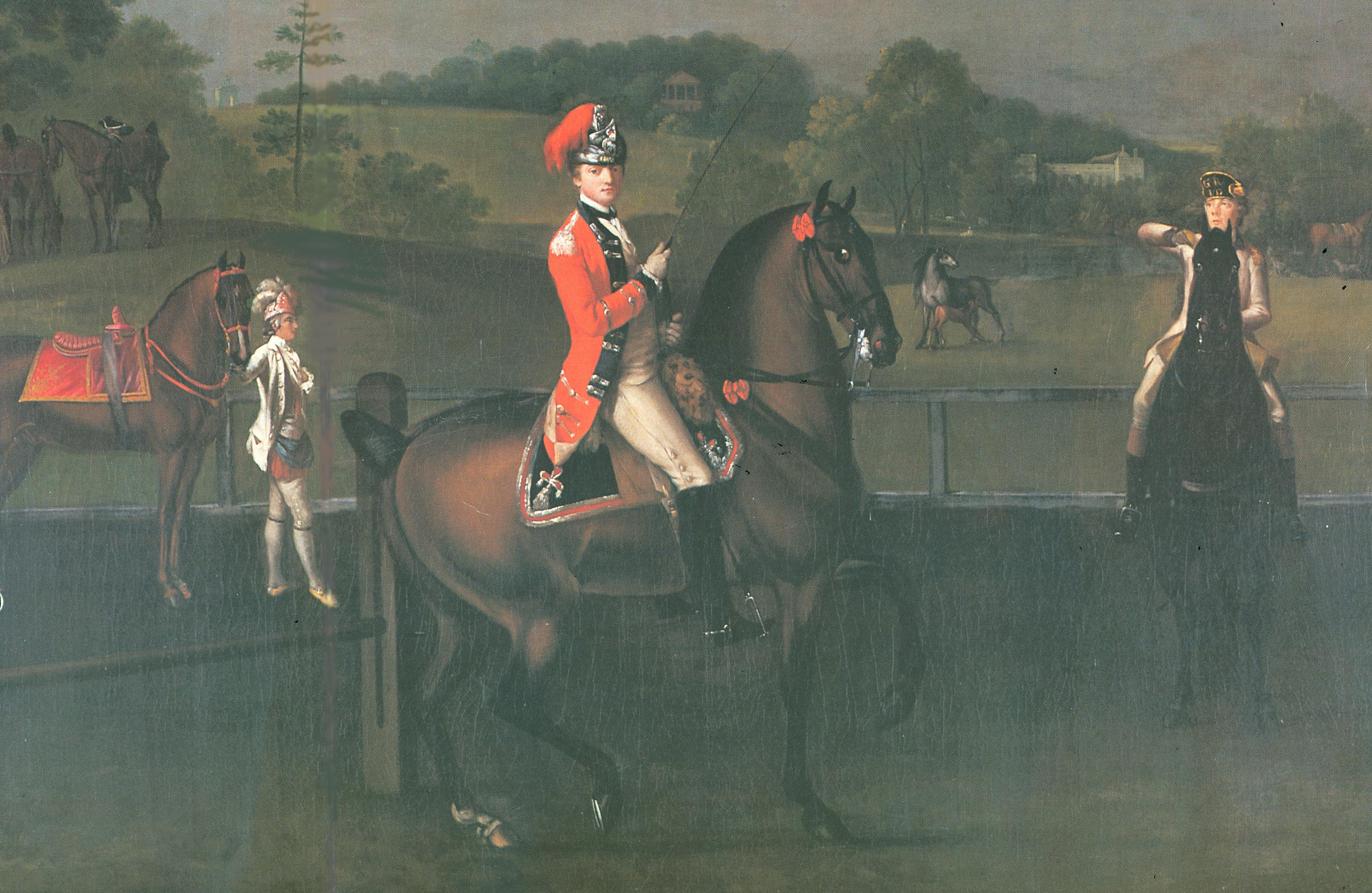
Hunter, Floyd and another officer at Wilton riding school, by Morier

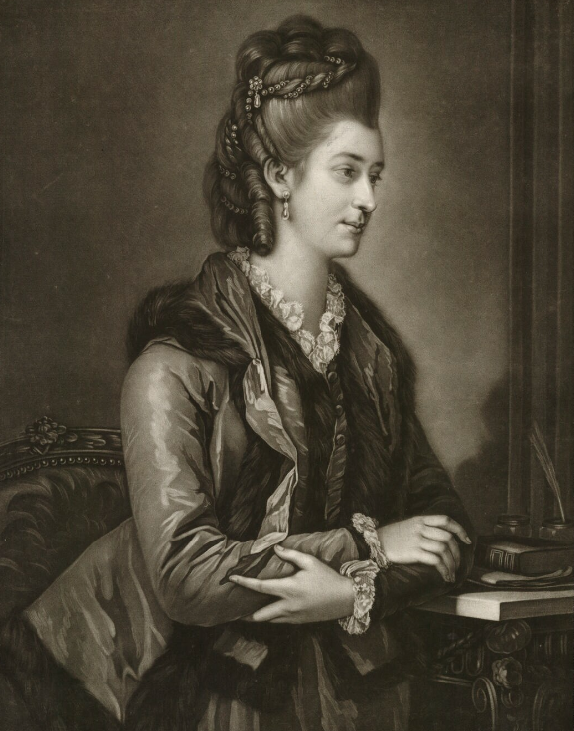
A mezzotint from a 1771 portrait by Edward Francis Cunningham

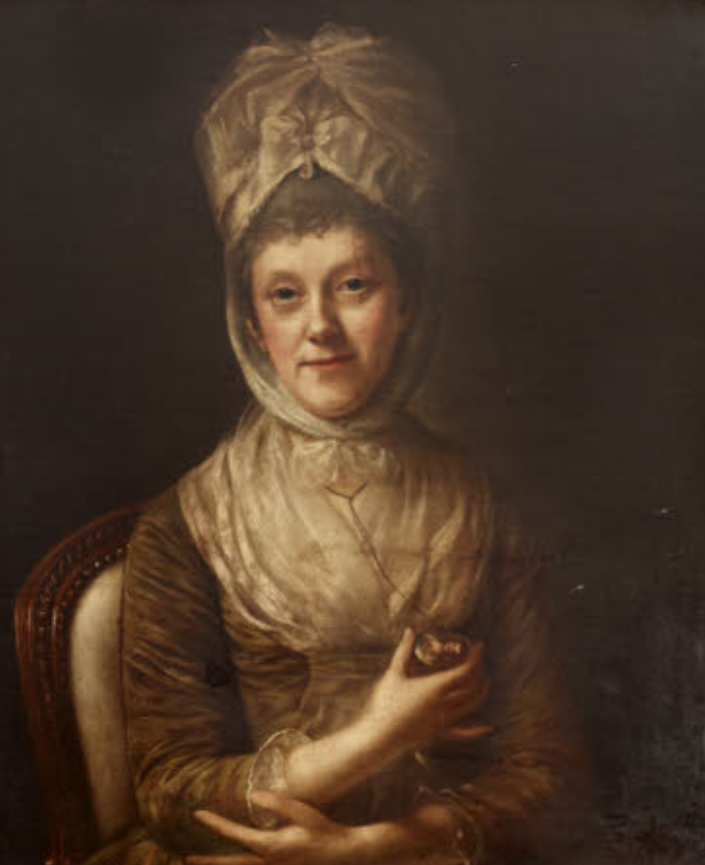
Portrait by Nathaniel Hone the Elder, 1780

Elizabeth Catherine Hunter, Lady Clarke (c. 1740 – 1795), best known as Kitty Hunter, was an English noblewoman. She was the daughter of Thomas Orby Hunter, a member of parliament and lord of the Admiralty. In 1762, she eloped to mainland Europe with Henry Herbert, 10th Earl of Pembroke, causing a scandal. A year later the couple returned to England and Pembroke reconciled with his wife. Hunter had a son by Pembroke, Augustus Retnuh Reebkomp, who was supported by the Pembroke family and became a naval officer. Hunter was the mistress of Augustus Hervey before marrying army officer Alured Clarke. When Clarke was knighted she became known as Lady Clarke.

== Early life ==
Elizabeth Catherine Hunter was born around 1740 and became known by the nickname "Kitty". She was the daughter of Thomas Orby Hunter, who became a member of parliament and a lord of the Admiralty, and Jacomina Carolina Bellenden. Her father had inherited Crowland Abbey, Lincolnshire, as part of the estate of his uncle, the last of the Orby baronets. During the Seven Years' War Hunter served as superintendent of supplies to the allied armies in Germany where he possibly had dealings with Henry Herbert, 10th Earl of Pembroke, a major-general who commanded a cavalry brigade.

Pembroke returned from Germany in January 1762 and became acquainted with Kitty Hunter, who was then serving as a maid of honour and was well known in society. Hunter was described by contemporary Horace Walpole as having "the face of a Madonna" and by another writer as "a handsome girl with a fine person, but silly".

== Elopement ==
In February 1762 Hunter and Pembroke danced at a masked ball where the couple are said to have made final arrangements for an elopement the following day. To be with Hunter, Pembroke left his wife, Elizabeth Herbert, Countess of Pembroke and Montgomery, who was said to be one of the most beautiful women in England. Hunter and Pembroke boarded a packet boat bound for the continent. A friend of Hunter's father, commanding a privateer, intercepted the boat and returned it to England. After Thomas Orby Hunter declined to receive his daughter the couple were released and allowed to board another vessel for mainland Europe. The couple ended up in Italy from where Pembroke wrote to his wife stating that he had never been able to love her as well as she deserved and thought it best to separate. He did, however, invite her to join him and Hunter in mainland Europe. Elizabeth declined and moved into Blenheim Palace, the estate of her brother, George Spencer, 4th Duke of Marlborough.

The elopement was one of the biggest scandals of the period and has been called the "most scandalous matrimonial farce of the age". Emily FitzGerald, Duchess of Leinster wrote that, because of the elopement, Kitty's father was "quite distracted" and the Countess of Pembroke "very unhappy". Later in the year four letters purporting to be between Pembroke and Kitty were published as a book as four genuine letters which lately passed between a noble lord and a young woman of fashion to which is added a letter from a lady to Miss ****** with a copious preface setting that affair in a true light. By a friend of the Earl of ******. Walpole wrote a short rhyme on the affair, alluding to Pembroke's renown as a skilled cavalryman: "As Pembroke a horseman by most is accounted, ' Tis not strange that his Lordship a Hunter has mounted".

Joshua Reynolds had painted Kitty Hunter in 1761, during the same time as he painted the Countess of Pembroke, the resulting painting was sent to Hunter's father. It depicts Hunter on the night of the masked ball, with a mask in her hand. Hunter and Pembroke had a son together who was named Augustus Retnuh Reebkomp; the middle name being his mother's surname reversed and the surname an anagram of Pembroke. After twelve months the relationship ended and Pembroke returned to England and was reconciled with his wife.

== Later life ==
Hunter returned to England and became a mistress of the naval officer, Augustus Hervey, who later became the 3rd Earl of Bristol.

Even after the end of their relationship, Hunter continued to associate with Pembroke. She visited his riding school at Wilton and was included in a series of paintings commissioned by Pembroke of himself and his friend John Floyd, an army riding instructor. Hunter appears, disguised as a page, in a painting of Floyd in one of the school's paddocks. Pembroke's records show the painting as being commissioned in 1763, though the Wilton House catalogue lists it as a work of 1764–65. It may be even later as Floyd's uniform includes details only introduced in 1766–68.

The Pembrokes informally recognised the earl's son with Hunter, Augustus. Pembroke wanted him to adopt his family name of Herbert but his wife objected; the boy was in the meantime known informally by the surname Reeb. Augustus joined the navy and, upon his promotion to captain, was allowed the surname of Montgomery, one of Pembroke's subsidiary titles. His family was well supported by the Pembrokes with an allowance worth up to £9,000 per year.

Hunter herself received a smaller allowance of £1,000 per year. This was reduced to £600 in 1771 when Hunter married Captain Alured Clarke, a British army officer. Hunter's allowance was reduced further to £200 in 1781 and ceased, with the payment of a £1,600 lump sum, in 1790 when Clarke was promoted to major-general. Hunter and Clarke had no children. Clarke later rose to the army's top rank, field marshal. After her husband was knighted Kitty Hunter was known as Lady Clarke. When Pembroke died in 1794 Hunter received a payment in his will, but she died the following year.
