= Gertrude Sandmann =

Gertrude Sandmann (November 16, 1893 - January 6, 1981) was a Jewish-German artist who survived the Holocaust and advanced the causes of LGBT people.

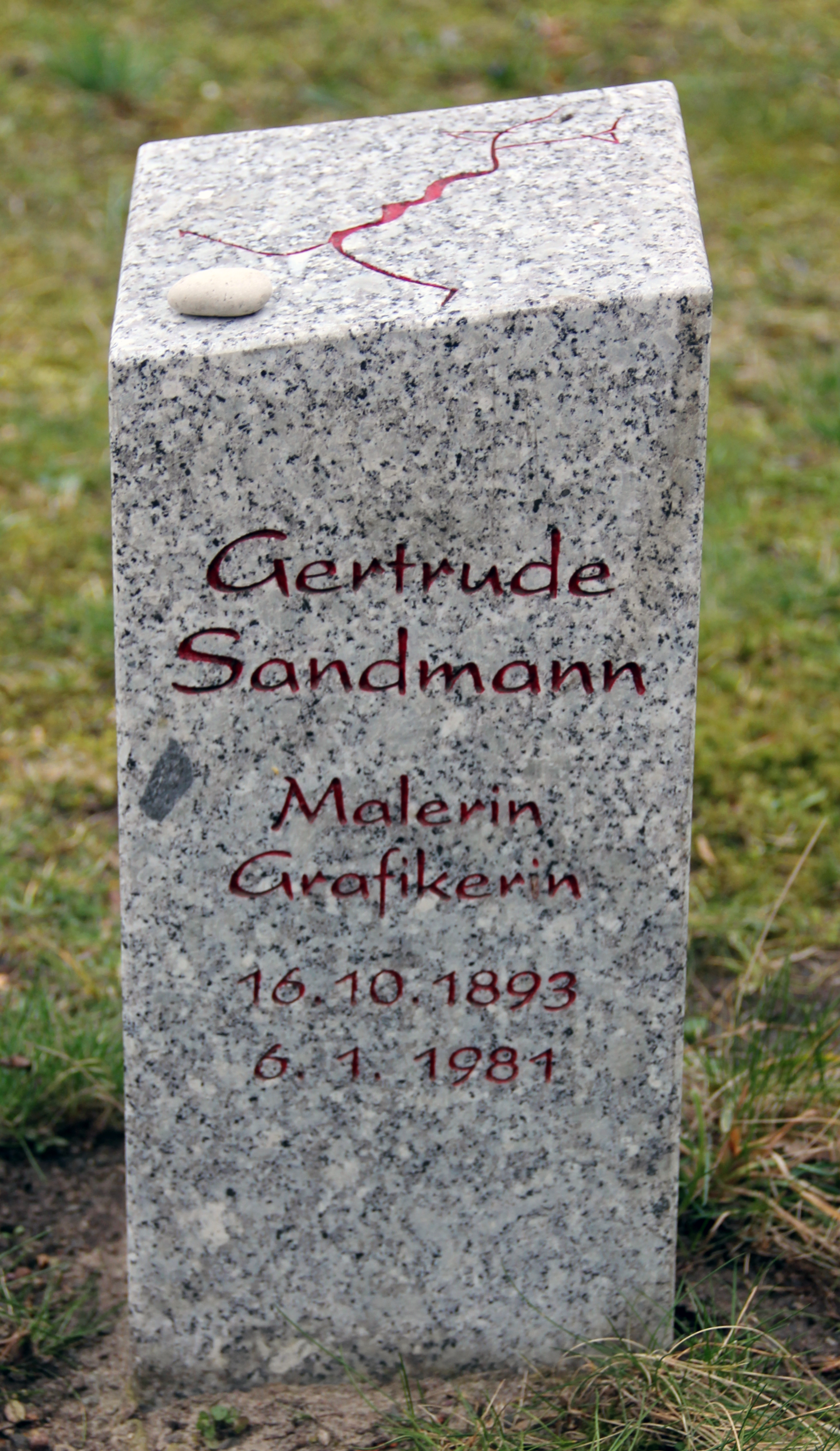
Sandmann's Grave

Sandmann was born into a wealthy family in Tiergarten, an affluent suburb of Berlin. Her family was wealthy and until the Nazis came to power was assimilated into German society, evidenced by the fact that her father was a commercial judge and a civil deputy. Her father's wealth came from ownership of plantations in East Africa and as a liquor industry manufacturer. Her father died in 1917. She had a sister and stayed with her mother until her death in 1939.

After finishing school with the Abitur, Sandmann started art school at the Berlin Association of Women Artists at a time when women were not admitted to the Berlin Academy of Fine Arts. She later studied under the personal tutelage of Käthe Kollwitz who remained her friend until Kollwitz's death in 1945. Sandmann usually drew with chalk or charcoal but also painted and the subjects of her artwork were usually women.

Sandmann knew from an early age that she was a lesbian, but due to social pressures of the time, was briefly married to a man and was soon divorced. She found her partner in a non-Jewish German woman named Hedwig Koslowski who she began a relationship with in 1927. Sandmann moved to Switzerland to pursue her art but had to return to Germany in 1934 as she was unable to extend her work permit.

In that same year of 1934 she lost her membership in the Reich Association of Artists due to her status as a non-Aryan German. Many of her fellow Jewish artists left Germany for other countries in 1939 but Sandmann stayed in Germany to be with her ailing mother. Sandmann's mother died one month after she had received a visa to emigrate to England but at the time of her mother's death the visa was no longer valid.

Sandmann was to be deported on November 21, 1942, at a time when most Jewish residents in Germany understood this to be a death sentence. She left a suicide note and all of her belongings in her apartment to make the suicide more believable to the Gestapo. Sandmann's partner Koslowski helped to find her places to hide away in Berlin throughout the remainder of the war until she was liberated when the Allied Forces defeated the Nazis in 1945.

Despite contracting serious health problems due to malnutrition and exposure to cold during her time hiding, Sandmann was able to continue her art career. She found a studio in the Schoeneberg district of Berlin where she lived and worked until her death in 1981. She was featured in many post-war exhibitions and in 1974 had a solo exhibition displaying many of her post-war pieces of art.

Gertrude Sandmann continued with her career in art while advocating for LGBT causes until her death in 1981.

== Early life and education ==
There is little historical record of the beginning of Sandmann's life, but we do know some. Gertrude was born November 16, 1893, to a wealthy assimilated Jewish family. She was born in Tiergarten, a well-off section of West Berlin. Tiergarten was first documented in 1530 and became hunting ground which rulers took advantage of until it started to become more economically developed and became a city. It is best known for its park, which is the largest in Berlin. The Tiergarten park was destroyed during WW2, but was rebuilt and replanted with the help of donations from the British. Berlin saw a lot of World War II, including the Battle of Berlin in 1945, which was also known as The Fall of Berlin. It took place from April 20-May 2, 1945 and ended in the Tiergarten park. There is a memorial now up, stating the resting place of thousands of the "Hero's of the Soviet Union".

Gertrude's family got their wealth from her father, David Sandmann, who had become wealthy from his plantation that he owned in East Africa. He was a manufacturer in the liquor business. He later became more well known with his jobs as a commercial judge and later a civil deputy.

In 1913 Gertrude started her studying of painting at the art school Berlin Association of Women Artists. Up until the end of WWI, women weren't allowed to study at the Berlin College of the Fine Arts. From the time of 1917–1921, she studied at different schools in and out of Germany. In 1922 she was able to get tutored personally by Kathe Kollwitz. She focused mainly on portraits of women, even though her teacher was very interested in political topics. She was always seen as an incredible student and a remarkable artist. She continued studying and painting until 1935 when the Nuremberg Laws were first enacted. These were laws that were racist and anti-semitic. They were first announced at a Nazi rally that was being held in Nuremberg, a German city. They were also known as the Nuremberg race laws. They were laws that were made to "protect German Blood and German Honor". It banned Jewish people having sexual relations or marriage with someone with German blood. The Nazis saw Jewish people as a different race, and the law made it so under law, a citizen was someone "of German or related blood", and since Jewish people were seen as a different race, this caused them to not be citizens, and have zero rights in Germany. After this she was forbidden from continuing her career and was removed from the Arts Association.

Though there isn't a lot publicly known about Gertrudes early life and how she grew up, we do know that she grew up as a wealthy assimilated Jewish girl in Berlin Germany. With this information we can gather that she was integrated into her community because her family was assimilated. For her, there was a mix of opportunity and tension looming over her and her family. By 1880, the year she was born, most Jews in Berlin were well-integrated into German society. Since religious practice varied greatly from family to family, we don't know how much the Sandmanns' practiced publicly their Judaism, especially with the amount of anti-semitism was starting to rise within Berlin. Because her family was wealthy, she most likely got a good childhood education, and lived in a nice house in her city of Tiergarten.

== The Holocaust ==
Beginning in January 1933, and ending in May 1945, the Holocaust was the methodical, and state-sponsored mass murder of over 6,000,000 European Jews.

It began when Adolf Hitler rose to power. Due to the Nazi party and Adolf Hitler's antisemitism, the Holocaust began with the government unjustly excluding Jewish people from German society with discriminatory laws. For example, they couldn't own businesses, they weren't allowed to work, they had a strict curfew, and so much more. Their way of life became extremely restricted. During this time, a lot of Jewish people felt extremely pressured to relocate.

Why did the Nazi party target Jewish people? The Nazi party falsely believed that Jewish people were the reason for Germany's economic, social, and political conflicts. More specifically, they placed blame on Jewish people for their loss in World War I, because the majority of their economic and political issues followed after that loss.

The Nazi Party began to promote an extremely harmful form of racial antisemitism. The Nazi Party believed that people of the world were split into different races, and falsely believed that some races were more superior than others. They considered themselves a part of the “Aryan” race. They believed that they did no wrong, and the root of their struggles were because of other “inferior” races. They deemed Jewish people as the most dangerous, and most inferior. Now, the Nazi Party decided that Jewish people were a threat to Germany, and that they needed to get rid of them or else their struggles wouldn't end.

On September 1, 1939, Nazi Germany began World War II by attacking Poland. Nazi Germany extended their control farther by allying with Italy, Hungry, Romania, and Bulgaria. Slovakia, Japan, and Croatia seemed independent, but they were actually controlled by Germany too. These countries were known as the Axis Alliance.

Three years go by... and due to annexations, invasions, occupations, and alliances, Nazi Germany now was in control of parts of North Africa, and the majority of Europe.

Together, Nazi Germany and their allies brutally murdered over 6,000,000 Jewish people.

=== The Holocaust's effect on LGBT people ===
Jewish people were one of many groups devastatingly affected by the Holocaust. The LGBTQ+ community was also heavily affected.

Men who identified as gay were seen as unfit soldiers. Adolf Hitler banned all homosexual and lesbian organizations as soon as he took office as chancellor.

In May 1933, the Institute for Sexual Science in Berlin, founded by Dr. Magnus Hirschfield, who was a Jewish gay man, was raided, and if not all but most of its collection of over 12,000 books were burned. This was seen as an act by the Nazi soldiers to erase any trace of openly gay or lesbian culture.

In 1933, Paragraph 175 was enforced. It was a German statue that prohibited sexual relations between men. Following Paragraph 175, a new division of the Gestapo, the Nazi German state police, was formed. Anyone who was found going against Paragraph 175 could be sentenced to a decade in prison.

Around 90,000 men were arrested for homosexual activity between the years 1937–1939. Between 5,000 and 15,000 were imprisoned in concentration camps.

Survivors testified that people who wore a pink triangle, the symbol of homosexuality, were treated grievously with violence by their fellow inmates, and the guards, because of the prejudice against homosexuality. Unfortunately, they were subject to extreme conditions like sexual or physical abuse.

After the war, many gay concentration camp survivors did not deserve the compensation or acknowledgment that they rightfully deserved. Paragraph 175 lingered in existence all the way up until 1969, leaving many innocent people living in fear of imprisonment.

Finally, in May 1985, LGBTQ+ people received a public acknowledgment of all that they endured in a speech given by Richard von Weizsäcker.

In 1994, Paragraph 175 was abolished.

And in 2002, the German government pardoned those convicted under the statue during the Nazi era.

=== Sandmann's experience in the Holocaust ===
On the night of November 22, 1943, a devastating air raid began over Berlin. Six hundred British and Canadian airplanes dropped thousands of lethal bombs on the city for hours. Gertrude was in Berlin at the time. She had to crouch under her desk, hoping and praying for survival.

Gertrude persevered. Despite her artwork being banned, she still painted. She still allowed her self expression to be preserved.

Gertrude had to wear the Jewish star, which subjected her as an outcast on German streets. Much like every Jewish person at the time, she was living an extremely restricted life.

Gertrude realized what the Nazi Party coming into control meant for her, her friends, and her family. She wasted no time fleeing to Switzerland, but unfortunately, she had to return to Germany when she wasn't able to obtain the proper education and permits. She was banned from submitting to the national professional association of artists because of her “non-Aryan” heritage. She wasn't the only one. In 1935, every artist that identified as Jewish was banned from teaching, selling, or exhibiting their work.

In November 1942, Gertrude was threatened to be sent to a concentration camp. She decided that she was going to flee, and that she had nothing left to lose. The risk would be worth it. She fled her apartment, leaving all of her necessities to make it believable. For example, her food rations card, which was crucial for survival.

Sandmann was one of 1,200 Jewish people who survived the war underground.

== Sexuality ==
From a young age, Sandmann described herself as “closer to women than to men,” and throughout her life, particularly postwar, she was outspoken about lesbian issues. Despite the Weimar Republic's relative acceptance of male gayness for the period, Sandmann herself found it a difficult place to live as a lesbian. She had a relationship with a schoolmate, Lilly zu Klampen, in the early 1910s, but had to marry a doctor, Hans Rosenberg, in 1915 to please her parents, though they quickly divorced. She took a long-term partner, Hedwig Koslowski, some time later, and Koslowski aided greatly in Sandmann's concealment from the Gestapo. At eighty-one, she founded L74, an organization for elderly lesbians and the first of its kind in Berlin.

Hedwig Koslowski helped Sandman keep safe in November 1942, when she was in danger of being deported. Koslowski arranged hiding spots for Gertrude and provided food and ration stamps till the war was reaching an end. Before the war even started, many Nazis were appalled to the presence and visibility of lesbian and gay communities, provoking ill treatment towards people being accused of homosexuality which worsened over the 1930s-40's, making relationships like Gertrudes and Hedwig's very hazardous.

Although lesbian relationships between women were discriminated against at this time, they were not illegal like they were for men, due to the German statue, Paragraph 175, which criminalized sexual relationships between male genders, which allowed Gertrude's relationships to be more public in society. Throughout Gertrudes life, she was an open lesbian who contributed to the progressing acceptance of homosexuality within Berlin.

After the war, Gertrude continued to improve LGBT rights through her art, which is now showcased at Munich Documentation Center. It features stories of LGBTQ+ which traced queer lives in Germany within the first half of the twentieth century.

Gertrude would draw many portraits, one specifically being two nude women with their backs turned to the viewer who seem to be in a deep conversation. This was a good example of the artwork she would create later in life which centered nude women of all ages. Unfortunately, in her time period, art works done by female artists were hardly ever given proper recognition and were overlooked by museums and galleries because many people did not claim them as “real art”. In today's time, a large amount of artwork done by all different female artists has been discovered and brought into light, and many collections featuring LGBT+ art is being accepted and displayed.

== Art and work ==
=== Portraits of women ===
Sandmann's art often reflected her interests and reality. The vast majority of it, over her decades-long career, depicted women, all of various ages and relationships to each other. One of her earliest recovered sketches, Gruppe IX (1922), comes from the period she spent studying under Käthe Kollwitz. It depicts a pair of nude women with their backs turned. Though Sandmann's visual idiom would change a lot, the content of her art would stay largely consistent. While Sandmann was in hiding from the Nazis, she produced portraits like Sleeping Woman (1942–1945). Though more detailed than her earlier studies, it shares the simplicity and medium, Sandmann working only in charcoal and occasionally highlighting with white pastel. Sandmann continued to create after the Holocaust. Works like Mutter mit Tochter mit Großer Vase (1977) explored more kinds of female relationships in Sandmann's typical style. There's a large gap in her body of work, despite the belief that she created over 1,000 drawings throughout her career, because she left a full apartment behind in faking her suicide in 1942, and her art, considered “degenerate” because of her Jewish heritage, was subsequently destroyed by the Gestapo.

=== Nonhuman subjects ===
Sandmann's still life drawings are fewer and farther between, though they offer as much insight into her life at the time of their creation. Her drawing Berliner Fenster (1945) acts as a grim glimpse into her world in hiding, despite her marked avoidance of social commentary in her work.

== Postwar life and death ==
Gertrude's artistic spirit was worn down by the grueling years of war; she had suffered avoiding the persecution of the Nazis and even commented, "I don't have that much more time to live - if only I could buy time."

After the war, she created multiple works and participated in several exhibitions and had one solo exhibition and in 1968 over 70 of her drawings were shown in the House at Kleistpark in Schöneberg, an art gallery in Berlin in which Albert Buesche an art critic for the newspaper Tagesspiegel called her “an Artist by calling.”

After Gertrude's separation from her partner, Hedwig Koslowski, in 1956, Gertrude spent her days with her partner Tamara Streck, who formerly was a circus performer on the trapeze performing under, “artistic Support for the troops” and at that point worked as a professional driver.

In the 1970s Gertrude supported many women's projects and at 81 co-founded L74, a group for elderly lesbians and occasionally worked on the Newspaper “Unsere Kleine Zeitung” drawing “lovers” for the front page.

Tamara Streck died in October 1979 of pneumonia and occupational arthritis. The death of her partner, who was considerably younger than Gertrude, destroyed her will to live, as she was suffering from cancer, and she denied any life-extending treatments, dying on January 6, 1981. She was buried in Streck's grave.
