= Kitty Wilson-Evans =

American historical interpreter and storyteller

- Born: Fort Benning, Georgia
- Occupations: Historical interpreter; Storyteller

Kitty Wilson-Evans was an American historical interpreter and storyteller. She was noted for her educational performances about the lives of African Americans who were enslaved at Historic Brattonsville. For that work she researched and created a character who appeared in several books, plays, and in performances at various historical sites.

== Early life and career ==
Wilson-Evans was born in Fort Benning, Georgia, to a family with 14 siblings. She grew up in Columbus, Georgia.

Wilson-Evans worked as a kindergarten teacher until her retirement, after which she became a full-time historical interpreter.

== Historical interpreter ==
Wilson-Evans was the first African American interpreter at the Historic Brattonsville, where she started working as a historical interpreter in the early 1990s. There she portrayed a fictional character of her creation, meant to illustrate the life of an 18th-century slave. In addition to historical re-enactments, she also gave tours of the slave residence at Historic Brattonsville. She was an early practitioner of the idea of researching and creating the character of a fictional slave to dramatize the experiences of slaves on southern plantations at a historical site. In addition to working as a full-time interpreter at Historic Brattonsville, she also performed on special occasions at other historical sites, such as the Rose Hill Plantation State Historic Site and the Redcliffe Plantation State Historic Site.

== Other media ==
The character that Wilson-Evans portrayed as an interpreter inspired a character in the book Colonial Spy by M. C. Beckham. She also filmed a scene for The Patriot, but the scene was edited out. She regularly worked as a stage actor, performing at venues including Lincoln Memorial University. Wilson-Evans co-authored two books about the character, Kessi, whom she created and portrayed at Brattonsville: Kessie's Tales: The Adventures of an African-American Slave Girl in South Carolina (2008) and Old Maw: The Legend of Miss Kessie (2013).

== Awards and recognition ==
Wilson-Evans was given the Robert E. Lee Service Award by the Sons of Confederate Veterans in 2008, and may have been the first African American recipient of this award. There was a reception held in her honor as part of the 2009 Black History Month celebrations at the University of South Carolina Lancaster. Wilson-Evans was one of three recipients of the 2011 Keepers of the Culture Award from York County's Culture and Heritage Museums. In 2014, Wilson-Evans was given the Lifetime Achievement Award by the South Carolina African American Heritage Commission. In 2017, she received the Medal of Honor in the Arts from Winthrop University's College of Visual and Performing Arts.
