= Kitty Zijlmans =

Dutch art historian (born 1955)

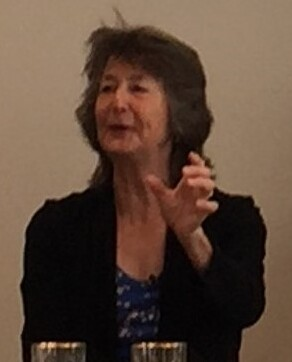
Kitty Zijlmans in 2023

C. J. M. "Kitty" Zijlmans (born 2 March 1955) is a Dutch art historian. She was professor of art history at Leiden University between 2000 and 2021. She has been mostly focused on visual arts and intercultural exchange.

== Life and career ==
Zijlmans was born on 2 March 1955 in The Hague. Her father was a window-dresser, while other family members were painters and sculptors. She became inspired by art at a young age. In 1974 she started studying art history at Leiden University. After seven years she finished her degree and managed to become assistant professor at the same university.

She obtained her PhD at Leiden University in 1989 with a thesis titled: "Kunst, geschiedenis, kunstgeschiedenis: methode en praktijk van een kunsthistorische aanpak op systeemtheoretische basis". At one point she worked as art history teacher at the Royal Academy of Arts and Design in 's-Hertogenbosch. In 2000 she became professor of modern art history at Leiden University. From 2000 to 2004 she was chair of the Art Historical Institute. She retired as professor in 2021.

Academically her interest lies in the field contemporary art, art theory, and methodology. In both research and education she has been mostly focused on the visual arts. Zijlmans has also been active in the field of the contributions and position of women in both culture as well as art. She has also shown interest in globalization and intercultural exchange in the art world. Zijlmans has propagated against a purely Western-centred view on the arts.

Zijlmans was elected a member of the Royal Netherlands Academy of Arts and Sciences in 2010.

== Personal life ==
In September 2018, she was hospitalized and took three quarters of a year to recover. She subsequently lowered her working hours to 60%. Her husband is a visual artist.
