= Kitty Cordeux =

British activist and novelist

- Born: 1862; Westbury-on-Trym
- Died: 6 October 1962 (aged 99–100); Watford
- Occupation: Activist, novelist

Kate "Kitty" Marion Cordeux (1862 – 6 October 1962) was a British novelist. She wrote three novels in the 19th century under the name Daniel Dormer and three under her own name in the 20th century.

== Life and career ==
Kitty Cordeux was born in 1862 in Westbury-on-Trym, the daughter of John Cordeux, a draper.

In 1926, she began a persistent letter-writing campaign urging the BBC to broadcast daily Christian religious services on the radio. The result was The Daily Service, beginning in 1928 and continuing to the present day. Her campaign was documented in the BBC Radio 4 documentary The Lady Behind the Daily Service (2005).

=== Death ===
Cordeux died on 6 October 1962 in Watford.

== Bibliography ==
- Out of the Mists. 1 vol. Bristol: Arrowsmith, 1886.
- The Mesmerist's Secret. 1 vol. London: John Maxwell, 1888.
- Steven Vigil. 2 vol. London: Chapman and Hall, 1891.
- The Romance of Mary the Blessed. Mowbray, 1917.
- The King's Tryst. Robert Scott, 1930.
- A Garland for Ashes. Skeffington, 1930.
