= List of storms named Kitty =

The name Kitty has been used for three tropical cyclones worldwide: one in the Northwestern Pacific Ocean, one in the South-West Indian Ocean and one in the Southwestern Pacific Ocean.

In the Northwestern Pacific:

- Typhoon Kitty (T4910) – struck Japan after Typhoon Judith.

In the South-West Indian:

- Cyclone Kitty (1973)

In the Southwestern Pacific:

- Cyclone Kitty (1971)
