= Kittie Knox =

African American female cyclist (1874–1900)

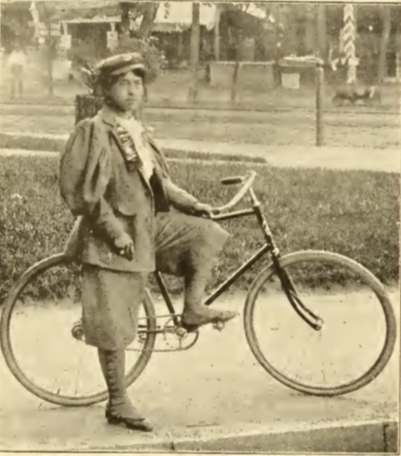
- Kittie Knox and bicycle
- Born: Katherine Towle Knox; October 7, 1874; Cambridge, Massachusetts
- Died: October 11, 1900 (aged 26); Boston, Massachusetts
- Occupation: seamstress
- Organization: League of American Wheelmen
- Known for: cyclist

Katherine Towle Knox (October 7, 1874 – October 11, 1900) was a bicycling barrier breaker and early African American member of the League of American Wheelmen (LAW).

== Bicycling career ==
Knox joined LAW in 1893. The organization changed its constitution to only allow white members in 1894. Knox persisted in her membership despite sometimes being denied access particularly while attending a LAW national meet in Asbury Park, NJ. She was a strong rider, participating in century rides. She was a seamstress and took first place in a cycling costume contest at the Waltham, Massachusetts cycle park. During this time, women were expected to wear long skirts when engaging in physical activity. However, Kittie Knox defied gender norms by wearing baggy trousers (bloomers) when cycling and riding a man's bike with a single gear and no brakes. Unlike her male counterparts, much attention was given to her appearance and wardrobe. The media often paid more attention to her looks than to her abilities as a cyclist.

== Personal life ==
Knox was born to Katherine Towle, a white woman from East Parsonfield, Maine, who was a millworker, and John Knox, a black man from Philadelphia who worked as a tailor. Kittie had one older brother, Ernest Knox, who worked as a steamfitter. Kittie was born in Cambridgeport, Massachusetts, and moved to Boston with her family in the 1880s after her father died. At the time, the Boston West End was an impoverished area and had limited opportunities for people of color. Knox found work as a seamstress, which allowed her to express her creativity and design her own cycling costumes.

Knox died from kidney disease in 1900 at the age of 26 and was buried in Mount Auburn Cemetery in a public lot. A headstone was erected for her by family members on September 29, 2013.

== Legacy ==
In 2019, the City of Cambridge, Massachusetts, named the Kittie Knox Bike Path after her. The path connects Broadway and Binney Street in Cambridge.

In 2022, MassBike and partners began hosting an annual bike ride in honor of Kittie Knox.
