= Kitty Stryker =

American sex educator and activist

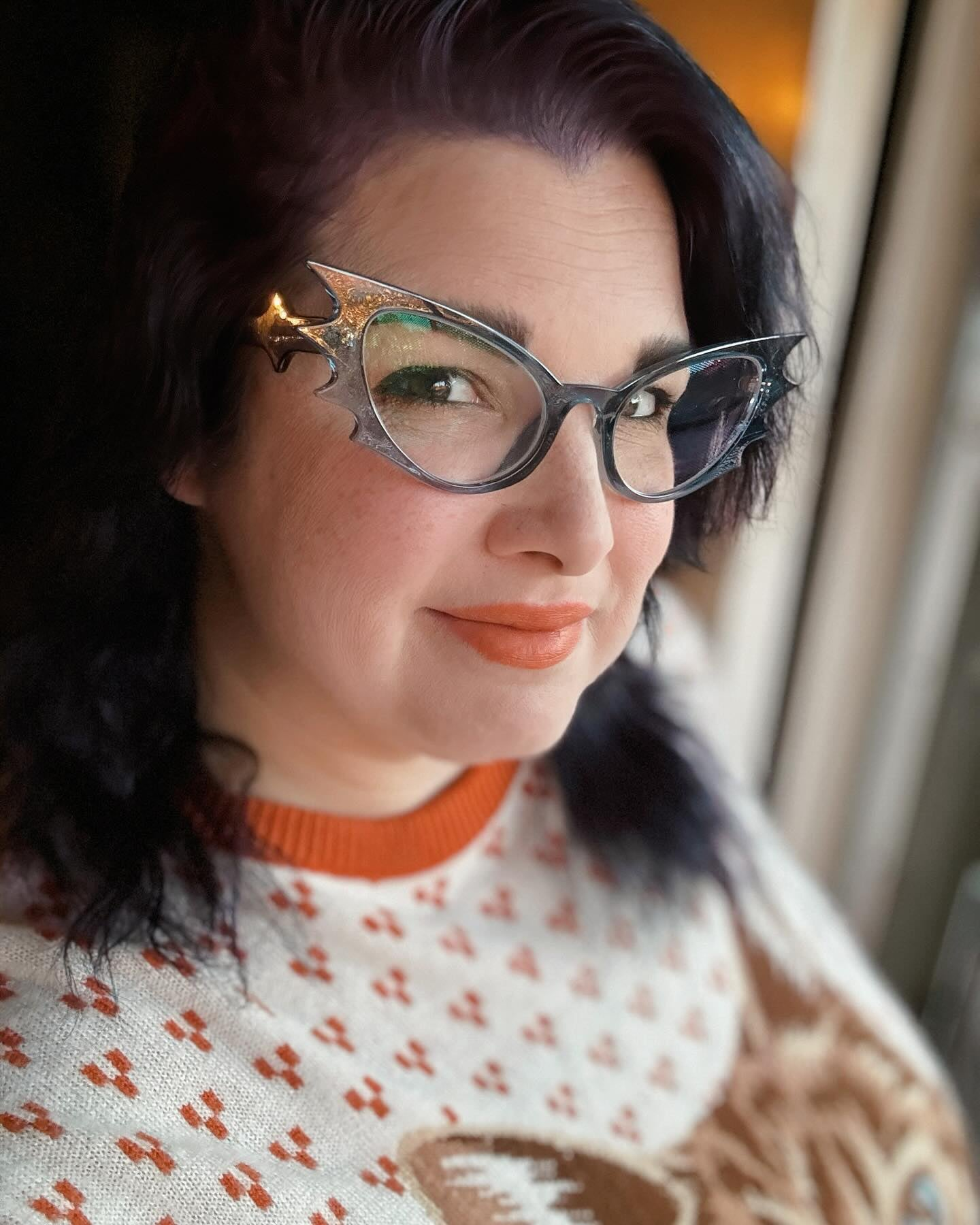
- Born: January 8, 1984 (age 42)
- Occupations: Sex educator; activist

Kitty Stryker (born 1984) is an American activist and sex educator known for promotion of consent in queer relationships.

== Early life ==
Stryker grew up in Massachusetts, moving to California at the age of 19. Stryker viewed this as a "fresh start" from her upbringing, adopting the new name of 'Kitty Stryker' and eventually becoming a pro-domme in San Francisco.

== Career ==
Stryker's workshops address the need for consent in the queer and kink communities. She is the author of an anthology and the author of two books on consent. Her third book was Say More: Consent Conversations for Teens (Thornapple Press, 2024).

According to The Telegraph of London, Stryker operated the Ladies High Tea and Pornography Society, a women's space for drinking tea and watching porn.

Stryker was the head of production for Ban This Sick Filth (2015), a film containing every item on a recently issued list of sexual acts that would not be permitted in pornographic films in the United Kingdom. The film was subsequently banned by PornHub.

She has also worked to bring the left-wing activist and Juggalo communities together by co-founding a group called the "Struggalo Circus".

== Books ==
=== Authored ===
- Say More: Consent Conversations for Teens. Thornapple Press. 2024. ISBN 978-1-990-86951-8.
- Ask Yourself: The Consent Culture Workbook. Thornapple Press. 2023. ISBN 978-1-778-24201-4. OCLC 1373984817.

=== Edited ===
- Ask: Building Consent Culture. Thorntree Press. 2017. ISBN 978-1-944-93425-5. OCLC 981985226.
