= Kitty (ship) =

Several vessels have borne the name Kitty, a diminutive for the name "Catherine", and a name in its own right:

- Kitty, of 12653/94 tons (bm), was a vessel that HMS Bellona captured from the French c.1778. The High Court of Admiralty condemned her on 14 April 1779 and Crosbie and Granwood, Liverpool merchants, purchased her that year. She stranded on the coast of Ireland and was sold there.
- Kitty (1784 ship), of 333 tons (bm), was launched at Liverpool in 1784. Between 1788 and 1805 she made nine voyages as a slaver. She then became a privateer, cruising off the River Plate. The French privateer Caffard captured her in 1806.
- Kitty (1787 ship) was a merchantman built at Sunderland in 1787. In 1790 she carried slaves from the Gold Coast to Jamaica. Then in 1791 she transported convicts and goods from England to Australia. She was last listed in 1805.
- Kitty (1800 ship) was a West Indiaman, then served the Royal Navy from 17 May 1804 to 17 January 1805, became a privateer with a notable single-ship action to her credit, a merchantman trading with Russia, a whaler, and a merchantman again. She was last listed in 1852.
- Kitty (1810 ship) was a French vessel taken in prize c. 1810. She became a West Indiaman and then, following a change of ownership, a privateer. She was one of only two British privateers to target slave traders. She captured three off Sierra Leone before one of her targets captured her in 1814, killing her master, enslaving some of her crew, and setting fire to her.
- Kitty (1850 ship) was launched at Sunderland. The Hudson's Bay Company chartered her in 1859 and she wrecked in Hudson's Strait later that year.
- SB Kitty (1895), a Thames barge, now based in Maldon, Essex

== See also ==
- Charming Kitty (1799 ship) was a ship captured from the Spanish. She first appears in the Protection Lists for whalers in 1799. She conducted four whaling voyages between 1799 and 1808 before becoming a West Indiaman, trading with the Caribbean. She was wrecked in October 1813.
- Kitty's Amelia (1803 ship) was Jeune Amélie launched in France in 1802. A British letter of marque captured her in 1803 and she became a Liverpool-based slave trader. Between 1804 and 1807 she made four slave-trading voyages but her chief claim to fame is that she performed the last legal slaving voyage for a British vessel. She was reported wrecked in 1809.
- Kitty Hawk-class aircraft carrier, US Navy aircraft carriers, now decommissioned
  - USS Kitty Hawk (CV-63), lead ship of the Kitty Hawk class, in commission 1961−2009
  - USS Kitty Hawk (AKV-1), a cargo ship and aircraft transport that served during World War II
