= Kitty Kántor =

Hungarian actress

- Born: Hungary
- Occupation: Actress

Kitty Kántor is a Hungarian actress. She contributes to voicing characters in cartoons, anime, movies, sitcoms, and more content.

== Life and career ==
Kántor is known for voicing Isabella Garcia-Shapiro in the Hungarian-language version of the Disney Channel original animated series Phineas and Ferb. She also voiced Hinata Hyuga in the Jetix edition of the anime series Naruto.

Kántor is also known for dubbing over many actresses such as Evanna Lynch, Allisyn Ashley Arm, Dakota Fanning, Abigail Breslin, and other famous actresses.

Currently, she works at SDI Media Hungary, Mafilm Audio, and other dubbing studios located in Budapest.

== Filmography ==
- Emma in The Collector
- Nóra Balogh (young) in Barátok közt
- Tímea in Szörnyek ebédje

== Voice dubbing roles ==
=== Animation ===
- Isabella Garcia-Shapiro in Phineas and Ferb
- Isabella Garcia-Shapiro/Isabella-2 in Phineas and Ferb the Movie: Across the 2nd Dimension
- Kirari Tsukishima in Kilari
- Numbuh 3 in Codename: Kids Next Door
- Rin in InuYasha
- Hinata Hyuga in Naruto (Jetix edition)
- Jaarin Lee in Digimon Tamers
- Young Yuki in Vampire Knight
- Yoko Okino in Case Closed
- Pearl in Finding Nemo
- Chicken 2 in The Ugly Duckling and Me!
- Marlene in Pinocchio 3000
- Fabia Sheen in Bakugan: Gundalian Invaders
- Apple Bloom in My Little Pony: Friendship is Magic
- Katie in Paw Patrol
- Penny Sanchez in ChalkZone

=== Live action ===
- Angela Ashford in Resident Evil: Apocalypse
- Sarah Davis in Raising Helen
- Zora Lancaster in Sonny with a Chance
- Max in The Suite Life of Zack & Cody
- Bridgette Dubois in Medium
- Luna Lovegood in Harry Potter
- Violet Beauregarde in Charlie and the Chocolate Factory
- Keegan in Holiday in the Sun
- Olivia Kendall in The Cosby Show
- Heidi Phillips in Grace Is Gone
- Samara Morgan in The Ring
