= 2014 in Japanese music =

The year 2014 in Japanese music.

== Events ==
- 65th NHK Kōhaku Uta Gassen

== Number-ones ==
- Oricon number-one albums
- Oricon number-one singles
- Hot 100 number-one singles

== Awards ==
- 2014 MTV Video Music Awards Japan

== Albums released ==
=== January ===
Day	Title	Artist	Genre(s)	Singles
8	Maid in Japan	Band-Maid	Rock	
21	Cross The Border	J-Min	J-pop, rock	
22	Tsugi no Ashiato	AKB48	J-pop	"Manatsu no Sounds Good!" (released May 23, 2012) "Gingham Check" (released August 29, 2012) "Uza" (released October 31, 2012) "Eien Pressure" (released December 5, 2012) "So Long!" (released February 20, 2013) "Sayonara Crawl" (released May 22, 2013) "Koi Suru Fortune Cookie" (released August 21, 2013)
29	Genesis of 2PM	2PM	J-pop, Dance-pop	"Give Me Love" (released June 29, 2013) "Winter Games" (released October 16, 2013)
29	New World	May'n		
29	Love Before We Die	Moumoon		"Lovin' You" (released October 25, 2013) "Emerald no Oka" (released November 6, 2013) "I Say You Say I Love You" (released January 15, 2014)

=== February ===
Day	Title	Artist	Genre(s)	Singles
19	vivid	Aya Hirano		
19	Loveland	Miliyah Kato		
19	a boy	Leo Ieiri		
26	Babymetal	Babymetal	J-pop, metal	"Doki Doki Morning" (released November 2, 2011) "Iine!" (released March 7, 2012) "Headbangeeeeerrrrr!!!!!" (released July 4, 2012) "Ijime, Dame, Zettai" (released January 9, 2013) "Megitsune" (released June 19, 2013)
26	Ride Me	Donghae&Eunhyuk	J-pop, Dance-pop	"Oppa, Oppa" (released April 4, 2012) "I Wanna Dance" (released June 19, 2013) "Motorcycle" (released February 26, 2014)

=== March ===
Day	Title	Artist	Genre(s)	Singles	Labesl
5	Tapestry of Songs - The Best of Angela Aki	Angela Aki			
5	WHO KiLLED IDOL?	BiS	Alternative Rock, Punk Rock, Metalcore, J-pop	"GET YOU" (released January 9, 2013)"BiSimulation" (released March 13, 2013) "DiE" (released June 26, 2013) "Fly / Hi" (released September 18, 2013) "STUPiG" (released January 22, 2013)	Avex Trax
5	Daigold	Daigo			
5	Waving Flags	Miu Sakamoto			
5	Tree	Tohoshinki	J-pop, Dance-pop	"Ocean" (released June 12, 2013) "Scream" (released September 4, 2013) "Veri Mery Xmas" (released November 27, 2013) "Hide & Seek" (released February 5, 2014)	
12	Zutto Suki Datta ~ALL MY COVERS~	Mika Nakashima			
12	Sakura Gakuin 2013 Nendo ~Kizuna~	Sakura Gakuin			
19	Dress To Kill	After School	J-pop, Dance-pop	"Heaven" (released September 25, 2013) "Shh" (released January 29, 2014) "Miss Independent" (released TBA)	
19	2	B1A4	J-pop, Dance-pop	"What's Happening?" (released December 18, 2013)	
19	Memories	U-KISS	J-pop, Dance-pop	"Fall In Love/Shape of Your Heart" (released December 18, 2013) "Break UP"(released February 19, 2014)	
26	Fairies	Fairies	J-pop, Pop	"More Kiss / Song for You" (released January 19, 2011) "Hero / Sweet Jewel" (released December 21, 2011) "Beat Generation / No More Distance" (released April 4, 2012) "Tweet Dream / Sparkle" (released July 25, 2012) "White Angel" (released December 14, 2012) "Hikari no Hate ni" (released July 24, 2013) "Run with U" (released February 19, 2014)	
26	Live Best	Girugamesh			Danger Crue
26	Five Stars	MyName	Pop	"Shirayuki" (released November 20, 2013) "F.F.Y (Fight For You)" (released March 26, 2014)	
26	Igajyakejyoro	Unicorn			

=== April ===
Day	Title	Artist	Genre(s)	Singles
2	The Best	Miliyah Kato and Shota Shimizu		
2	New Morning	Misia		
16	Supernal Liberty	Nana Mizuki		
TBA	untitled	Masafumi Gotoh		

=== May ===
Day	Title	Artist	Genre(s)	Singles
14	Gossip Girls	T-ara	J-pop, Dance-pop	"Number Nine" (released November 20, 2013) "Lead The Way"(released March 5, 2014) "Lucky Wannabeee"(released May 14, 2014) "Do You Know Me" (released May 14, 2014)
14	Love & Hate	Jun. K	J-pop	
28	New Page	F.T. Island	J-pop, rock	"Shiawase Theory" (released July 24, 2013) "Beautiful" (released January 22, 2014) "Mitaiken Future" (released April 2, 2013)

=== June ===
Day	Title	Artist	Genre(s)	Singles
4	Arui wa Anarchy	Buck-Tick	Digital rock, Dance rock, garage rock	"Keijijo Ryusei" (released May 14, 2014)
12	All Is Vanity	PassCode	Electronicore, Digital Hardcore, J-pop	
25	The End of the World	Mucc	Alternative metal, hard rock, dance rock, post-grunge	"HALO" (released September 25, 2013) "World's End" (released October 30, 2013) "ENDER ENDER" (released May 28, 2014)

=== July ===
Date	Title	Artist	Genre(s)	Singles	Notes	Labels
2	Urya-Oi!!!	BiS	Alternative Rock, Punk Rock, Metalcore, J-pop	"FiNAL DANCE / nerve" (released May 28, 2014)		Avex Trax
2	Darkest Angels	VIXX	Dance, k-pop, dance-pop	"Eternity" (released May 27, 2014) "G.R.8.U" (released July 31, 2013) "Hyde" (released May 20, 2013) "Voodoo Doll" (released November 20, 2013) "On and On" (released January 17, 2013) "Rock Ur Body" (released August 14, 2012) "Super Hero" (released May 24, 2012)	Korean language compilation album released in Japan	Jellyfish Entertainment, CJ Victor Entertainment
16	D'slove	Daesung	J-pop, Dance-pop			
23	Seventh Color	Boyfriend	J-pop, Dance-pop	"My Avatar" (released March 26, 2014) "Startup!" (released May 28, 2014)		
23	The Best	Girls' Generation	J-pop, Dance-pop, electropop	"Indestructible"n(released August 1, 2014)		

=== August ===
Day	Title	Artist	Genre(s)	Singles
6	Lonely Angel	Thelma Aoyama	J-Pop	

=== September ===
Day	Title	Artist	Genre(s)	Singles
3	Who's Back?	BoA	J-Pop, Dance-pop	"Shout It Out" (released March 5, 2014) "Masayume Chasing" (released July 21, 2014)
10	2014 S/S: Japan Collection	Winner	J-Pop, Dance-pop	—
17	Wave	CNBLUE	J-Pop, rock	"Truth" (released April 4, 2014) "Still" (released April 15, 2014) "Go Your Way" (released July 31, 2014) "Radio" (released August 27, 2014)
24	I'm Your Boy	SHINee	J-Pop, Dance-pop	"Boys Meet U" (released August 24, 2013) "3 2 1" (released December 4, 2013) "Lucky Star" (released June 25, 2014) "Downtown Baby" (released September 24, 2014)

=== October ===
Day	Title	Artist	Genre(s)	Singles
2	First Album	Tofubeats	J-pop, electropop	
8	Fantastic	Henry Lau	J-Pop	—
15	The Best (New Edition)	Girls' Generation	J-Pop, Dance-pop, electropop	Divine (released September 28, 2014); Show Girls (released September 28, 2014)

=== November ===
Day	Title	Artist	Genre(s)	Singles
19	Pop! Pop! Pop!	Crayon Pop	J-Pop	—
19	Love Sign	Infinite F	J-Pop	Heartbeat
26	Best Album	Girl's Day	J-Pop	—

=== December ===
Date	Title	Artist	Genre(s)	Singles	Notes	Labels
3	HELLO WORLD	SCANDAL	J-pop, Rock	"Departure" (released April 23, 2014) "Yoake no Ryuuseigun" (released July 16, 2014) "Image" (released November 19, 2014)		
3	Bandora	Maki Chang ^{ja}	J-pop			
10	Arche	Dir En Grey	Experimental Metal, Progressive Metal, Extreme Metal	"Rinkaku" (released December 12, 2012) "Sustain the Untruth" (released January 22, 2014)		Firewall Div.
10	Error	VIXX	J-pop, Dance-pop	"Error" (Released: December 10, 2014)	1st Japanese Single	Jellyfish Entertainment, CJ Victor Entertainment
17	Tree	Tohoshinki	J-pop, Dance-pop	"Sweat / Answer" (released June 11, 2014) "Time Works Wonders" (released November 5, 2014)		
17	Mamacita	Super Junior	J-Pop, Dance-pop			
24	Dilemma	Infinite	Rock			

== See also ==
- 2014 in Japan
- 2014 in Japanese television
- List of Japanese films of 2014
