= List of Jewelpet Happiness episodes =

- Official Illustration Art for the series, showing the main characters.
- No. of episodes: 52

Release
- Original network: TV Tokyo, TV Osaka
- Original release: April 6, 2013 – March 29, 2014

Series chronology
- ← Previous; Jewelpet Kira☆Deco! Next → Lady Jewelpet

Jewelpet Happiness (Japanese: ジュエルペット ハッピネス, Hepburn: Juerupetto happinesu) is the fifth Jewelpet anime series created by Sanrio and Sega and animated by Studio Comet, announced in Shogakukan's Pucchigumi magazine and directed by Hiroaki Sakurai, released to coincide with the franchise' 5th anniversary. The series aired on April 6, 2013, and ended on March 29, 2014, on TV Tokyo and TV Osaka. Happiness is the final Jewelpet Anime animated by Studio Comet, ending the studio's 5-year run before Zexcs took over production for Lady Jewelpet. The series focuses on the main heroine Chiari Tsukikage and her friends on managing the Jewelpet Café.

The music in the series is composed by Wataru Maeguchi. Happiness is confirmed to have two official songs. For Episodes 1-39, the opening and ending theme is At the End of the Light (光の果てに, Hikari no hate ni) while for Episodes 40 to 52, the opening and ending theme is titled RUN with U, both performed by the Japanese idol group Fairies. The song is composed by Tetsuro Oda and arranged by Kaz.

TC Entertainment, a group company of Tokyo Broadcasting System Holdings, Mainichi Broadcasting System and Chubu-Nippon Broadcasting announced 4 official DVD-Box sets of the series, each of the box sets containing 4 discs, spanning into each half of the series. The first box set is released on October 25, 2013, and will span into 4 discs. It includes a creditless version of the OP and ED videos, several concept art used in the anime, official cast and staff commentary and a limited 5th anniversary postcard of Ruby along with the heroines of all 5 series. The second box set is released on January 31, 2014, the third box set is released on April 25, 2014, and the fourth is released on June 27, 2014.

== Episode list ==
No.	Title	Original release date
1	"Let's Collect Magic Gems!"; Transliteration: "Mahō no Hōseki Atsume chao!" (Japanese: 魔法の宝石あつめちゃお！)	April 6, 2013
Queen Jewelina gather all the Jewelpets in one place and discuss and ask them a favor, as she shows them the Magical Jewel Box. The queen gives the Jewel Box to Ruby, and told her the only way to collect the jewels is to make friends and open a shop called Jewelpet Cafe. At the academy, the class has a speech with their teacher as Jewelina appeared on the screen, advertising the newly-opened Jewelpet Cafe when Chiari and her friends listen. Chiari arrives along with the others and saw a huge boom in the cafe, but not knowing to Ruby, this is the start of her troubles.
2	"It's Gone!"; Transliteration: "Kiechatta!" (Japanese: 消えちゃった～！)	April 13, 2013
Upon getting the first Magic Jewel for the Jewel Box, Chiari and her friends decides to work at the cafe. As Chiari and her friends know Ruby's cafe becomes popular, rumors about the Jewelpet Cafe are spread around. When everyone arrives and the party started, Chiari becomes excited on how many customers the shop had today.
3	"The Jewel Break!"; Transliteration: "Bureiku de Jueru!" (Japanese: ブレイクでジュエル！)	April 20, 2013
Nene has a hard time to manage her store due to it being renovated. After the girls had lunch, Nene leaves the group and go to the Library studying about managing a business. When Chiari and the others go to Jewelpet Cafe, they find that the place is not open during lunchtime.
4	"Friends Labu!"; Transliteration: "Nakayoshi, rabu!" (Japanese: なかよしらぶ～！)	April 27, 2013
Labra chooses Ruruka to be her friend, but she disagrees, harshly told her not to. Labra reflected on what she said until Ruby appears and tell them about Angela running away, shocking the two and knowing it was Labra's fault.
5	"I Want it No Matter What!"; Transliteration: "Dōshitemo Hoshī！" (Japanese: どうしても欲しい～！)	May 4, 2013
While looking over Jewel Box to see the three Magic Gems collected by the group, Garnet is somehow jealous that she has not found hers yet. Ruby and the others know about her as they got it from their friendship with Chiari and the others, causing her more jealous. Labra is bored and go to Angela instead, somewhat making Marie angry as the duo left.
6	"The Rose is Blooming!"; Transliteration: "Bara ga Saiteru!" (Japanese: バラが咲いてる～！)	May 11, 2013
In their dormitory, Chiari and her friends are checking her Jewel Pod to see what luck she will get today. However, her pod is not working error, which worries Chiari deeply regarding her luck situation. Ruby cheers Chiari up on her unlucky situation as she regains her spirit. As Sapphie uses her magic to protect it from the rain, Azusa explains to her that the little rose is for a Rose-Growing contest. Sapphie decides to help Azusa to grow the little Rose for the contest itself.
7	"Pet Me, paca!" Transliteration: "Nade-nade suru, paka!" (Japanese: なでなでするパカ～！)	May 18, 2013
While walking to school, Chiari, Nene, and Ruruka discuss about their luck for today. Later, Chiari and Ruby go to the cafe, where Sanada and the others hang out as they gather information about Asano's problems that are being discussed. Hearing about this, Chiari and Ruby step in and decide to cheer him up.
8	"Jewelpet Elections!"; Transliteration: "Juerupetto Sōsenkyo!" (Japanese: ジュエルペット総選挙～！)	May 25, 2013
While admiring the Magic Gems one day, Rossa worries that she does not have one due to not having a personality of her own. Rossa is peeking in the windows and wonders on one idiom as she is secretly being watched. At the same time, Ryoko is starting to develop an unexpected relationship with Rossa and worries about her.
9	"The Fortune-telling Pudding!"; Transliteration: "Uranai Purin!" (Japanese: うらないプリン～！)	June 1, 2013
Chiari agrees to have a day off with Ruby until her roommates want Chiari to check her fortune. Afterwards, the two stroll around the campus, talking about Chiari bad luck and how she must be prepared for what will happen.
10	"The Red Moon is an Ill Omen!"; Transliteration: "Akai tsuki ga yana kanji!" (Japanese: 赤い月がやな感じ～！)	June 8, 2013
One night, Chiari and her friends are watching a detective drama as they are about to go to bed. They then receive a visit from Charlotte, a bumblebee Jewelpet who guards the campus at night. The four must find a way to get the gem back to the cafe without Ruby and her friends noticing them.
11	"It's the Athletic Meet!"; Transliteration: "Undōkai da yo!" (Japanese: うんどうかいだよ～！)	June 15, 2013
As the day of the Athletic Meet comes, the students are all ready for today's competition as Chiari and Ruby cheer for Sanada. The competition begins with the Kindergarten Tricycle Race as Takarada cheer squad cheer. However, Sachi is feeling a little insecure about the competition.
12	"Gokuro-san Trio-mochi~!" (Japanese: ごくろ～さんトリオもっち～)	June 22, 2013
As Apel Yamada parks his swan boat one day in the lake near the academy, he spots Ruby in the distance as he thinks she is running towards him, but she just meets her friend from Sweetsland named Sakuran, a Sakuramochi Sweetspet.
13	"There's a Dragon!"; Transliteration: "Doragon ga iru!" (Japanese: ドラゴンがいる～！)	June 29, 2013
While waking in the forest one day, Labra, Angela, and Rossa encounter a Chihuahua Jewelpet named Milky. When the dragon appears, the trio are amused and also starting to like the big beast. At Jewelpet Cafe, Marie, Mutsumi and Nobara discuss about the scary Red-Eyed dragon they saw. However, Milky is saddened on his sudden change as the Red Moon controls his actions.
14	"Taira-kun is Amazing!"; Transliteration: "Taira-kun Kakkoī~!" (Japanese: 平くんかっこいい～！)	July 6, 2013
As Taira and his friends are busy practicing for their music act for the upcoming summer festival, a sheep Jewelpet named Flora hears their practice. At the cafe, the girls discussed about Flora and how she is doing in the farm to earn her own Magic Gem. As she uses her magic to make it nice and cold, the girls are overwhelmed by the cold until Taira saw them and gets her to safety, with Ruby using her magic to get the others out. Upon getting out, the high school students start to admire Taira with Flora in his arms.
15	"Delivering Letters!"; Transliteration: "Otegami Todokeru!" (Japanese: お手紙とどける～！)	July 13, 2013
As she decides deliver her invitation letters to the post office, Ruby tells Chiari and the others about Luna along the way. After all the confusion, Luna formally introduces herself to the girls and Sapphie mentions she manages the post office by herself and delivers the letters. Despite how well the two treat her, Luna still thinks she has never achieved her own happiness.
16	"Ride the Waves!"; Transliteration: "Nami ni Norutte!" (Japanese: 波に乗るって～！)	July 20, 2013
Due to the cafe not having many customers during summer, Ruby comes up with an idea to open a shop in the beach for them to make more profit. Later on, they opened a cafe named "Jewelpet Seaside Cafe" on the beach and goes to work, with each of them cooking, and serving food for customers. They also watch over a volleyball competition between Kosuke, Mori, Takumi and Taira, as he tells Chiari she has the potential to be his girlfriend.
17	"A Test of Courage, Jewel-rimpa~!"; Transliteration: "Kanta Meshida yo juerinpa~!" (Japanese: 肝試しだよジュエリンパ～！)	July 27, 2013
The gang decides to try the gut breaking Owarai as Titana, a chipmunk Jewelpet. As he continues his routine and the Jewelpets laugh on his jokes, Sapphie explains to the girls that Titana is an expert comedian who won the Jewelpet Funny Faces competition. The next day, Titana's comedy show begins in the cafe, with every Jewelpet from Jewelina's castle seeing him perform. However, Azusa grows concerned about his stories, knowing he lied to them.
18	"Mōri-kun, Table Tennis"; Transliteration: "Mōri-kun, Takkyū da yo" (Japanese: 毛利くん卓球だよ～♪)	August 3, 2013
In Jewel Academy's Annual Sports Camp, Chiari and her friends listen to Apels' speech regarding the upcoming Table Tennis competition, something that made Mōri felt uneasy. As the students register for a scavenger hunt, Chiari encounters Azusa once again and talks about the Table Tennis match.
19	"It's Cold, It's Cold!"; Transliteration: "Samui yo, Samui yo!" (Japanese: さむいよさむいよ～！)	August 10, 2013
As summer is about to end, the Jewelpets are busy with their chores at Jewelpet Cafe. In the school cafeteria, the aircon itself breaks down while Sapphie is making some shaved ice dessert for Labra to beat the heat. After a while, Jasper finally fixed the aircon, but something is wrong with it.
20	"The Coffee Beans on the Mountaintop!"; Transliteration: "Yama ni Nobotte Kōhī Mame!" (Japanese: 山に登ってコーヒー豆～！)	August 17, 2013
Having collected 18 Magic Gems and filled the Jewel Box, Ruby invites Opal, an Alicorn Jewelpet, to see them in their lustrous shine. Opal tells them to go to Rock Cafe to enjoy some coffee as Ruby agrees. At Rock Cafe, Taira is ordering a cup of coffee for his master, but noticed that he used up all of the coffee beans and finally starts to brew.
21	"It's Not Enough, Labu!"; Transliteration: "Are ga Tarinai, rabu!" (Japanese: アレが足りないらぶ～！)	August 24, 2013
With one more Magic Gem to go, Ruby is very excited to see what miracle will the Jewel Box bring. As Chiari and the other Jewelpets learn this, both Jewelpet Cafe and the school cafeteria start to shine.
22	"Vegetable Sommellier!"; Transliteration: "Yasai Somerie, apuppu!" (Japanese: 野菜ソムリエあっぷっぷ～！)	August 31, 2013
Vegetable Sommelier notices their problem due to his nose and decides to help them with his magic, changing his costume and baked some carrot cake and special pound cake for the girls. As the gang taste, they all like the texture and taste of the newly-baked desserts. When Labra, Angela and Rossa greet him, he was in a sad mood because they noticed him being possessed by the Red Moon.
23	"Apprentice Puppy!"; Transliteration: "Deshiiri Wako!" (Japanese: 弟子入りワンコ～！)	September 7, 2013
Kohaku, a Shiba inu Jewelpet, barges in and wants to be their apprentice. At the cafe, Kohaku explained to the boys on why he wanted them to teach him to be cool. After school, Kohaku starts following Sanada in hopes that he can teach him to be a man. As he gets mad on what Sanada said to him, the Red Moon starts to brainwash him.
24	"Brown Bear School!"; Transliteration: "Higuma no Gakkō nano desu!" (Japanese: ヒグマの学校なのです！)	September 14, 2013
Rossa wakes up from a dream about dancing with brown bears as she begins her day in Jewel Land. At the cafe, Ruby herself is very sad that she did not get to come with Chiari. Sapphie feels bad for Ruby and allows to go with Chiari again as she leaves the cafe in glee.
25	"A Stage Play with Prase~!"; Transliteration: "Purēzu to Oshibai!" (Japanese: プレーズとお芝居〜！)	September 21, 2013
Both Chiari and Ruby are about to race each other back to the Jewelpet Cafe. Azusa appears and is amused on what she heard as they discuss about it, and everyone decides to help out for the upcoming play. As her practice is not going smoothly, Ruby then breaks down to tears on their mishaps and runs away, making the others sad and endangering the upcoming performance.
26	"A Beauty at the Jewelpet Cafe!"; Transliteration: "Juerupetto Cafe de Byūti!" (Japanese: ジュエルペットカフェでビューティ～！)	September 28, 2013
With Jewelpet Cafe bustling as Garnet hopes to be the most popular Jewelpet, Ruby and the others hope on aiming this as well until they are approached by a Siamese Cat Jewelpet named Kaiya. However, when the others collapse from exhaustion, Kaiya is disappointed on them, with Nene feeling some sympathy to her friends.
27	"World Champion is Amazing, paca!" Transliteration: "Sekai Chapio Sugoi, paka!" (Japanese: 世界チャピオすごいパカ〜！)	October 5, 2013
The gang attend the live interview of Takumi Asano at Jewelpet Café, with them admiring his looks and skills during. Feeling crushed, Takumi hopes that it would erase his desire for Angela. Sanada then appear and has a conversation with the two, talking about Takumi's problems and cheering him up. Takumi, now being more motivated, ask Angela for a special favor while petting her.
28	"A Blue Bird came Flying!"; Transliteration: "Aoi Tori ga Tonde Kita!" (Japanese: あおい鳥が飛んで来た〜！)	October 12, 2013
As Ruruka and Nene are greeted by Jewelina, a strange bird came flying and crashed onto Ruby. At the cafe, the bird introduces herself as Rin, a Parakeet Jewelpet who is the blue bird Jewelina mentioned. Sapphie is worried on Garnet due to her behavior when a blue seaweed is stuck on her teeth.
29	"It's Not Good If You Only Wish~!"; Transliteration: "Hoshigari sugi wa dame na no ne~!" (Japanese: 欲しがりすぎはダメなのね〜！)	October 19, 2013
Marie, Nobara, and Mutsumi come to the Jewelpet Cafe to discuss something to Chiari and the others. With her feeling determined, the others were questioned about her as Marie told them she wanted a Magic Gem of her own even if she wanted to go desperate. Sanada then appears and gives Chiari an advice on how to cheer Marie up.
30	"Jewel Halloween!"; Transliteration: "Jueru Harouin!" (Japanese: ジュエルハロウィ～ン！)	October 26, 2013
Charlotte has finished watching another episode of Jewel Detective on her Jewel Pod. Arming herself up, the ghosts reveal themselves as Ruby and the others with them being dressed up in Halloween costumes. Later at the cafe, Ruby explained to her what Halloween is and how some customs like "Trick or Treating" goes as they all manage this year's Halloween Party. Chiari, Nene, and Ruruka arrive at the cafe on time with their costumes on and are greeted Ruby and the others. When Ruby tries to use her magic to stop them, Chiari's group becomes encased in food costumes as Chite's group starts chasing them on hunger. Even worse, the Red Moon's influence on the three Jewelpets is making the situation unhappy and Charlotte herself in a huge pinch.
31	"Marie's Deepest Secrets!"; Transliteration: "Marie-chan ni wa himitsu deshi~yu!" (Japanese: まりえちゃんにはヒミツでしゅ！)	November 2, 2013
Garnet hosts a meeting with Chiari and her friends to discuss another way to promote the Jewelpet Cafe, saying that the Cafe should be featured in a magazine ad with a Jewelpet promoting it. Meanwhile, a Holland lop Jewelpet named Io is looking at the sky until he receives Garnet's e-mail on his Jewel Pod about the advertising idea. Ruby then gets an idea and uses her magic on Io, which causes terrible transformations before being turned back to normal. Later, Ruby and Chiari need to find another way to convince Nobara he is a rabbit.
32	"I Got Eaten!"; Transliteration: "Taberarechatta yo!" (Japanese: 食べられちゃったよ〜!)	November 9, 2013
Much to the new Roll Cake cooked by Chiari and Jewelpets, Apels is driving his swan boat as he thinks about his elegance until he heard about some sort of performance in the Jewelpet Cafe. Back at the cafe, a circus performance is held, with every Jewelpet performing their own tricks before Rald appears and stole the show. After the performance, Apels applauded on what Chiari and her friends did, offering them that he should perform with the pets. He then regains consciousnesses and sees Rald as both of them are in the ocean.
33	"Farewell, Jewelpet Cafe!"; Transliteration: "Sayonara, Juerupetto Kafe!" (Japanese: さよならジュエルペットカフェ!)	November 16, 2013
A mysterious man in a limousine arrives in front of Jewelpet Cafe and gives a strange letter to Garnet. As Garnet opens the letter and reads it, Sapphie then explains that he is from the Jewelpet Hunting Society, searching for Garnet to become the new boss of a prestigious cafe.
34	"The Jewel Academy is Gone!"; Transliteration: "Jueru Gakuen Nakunacchau!" (Japanese: ジュエル学園なくなっちゃう〜！)	November 23, 2013
While a Russian Blue Jewelpet named Lapis is looking at the Red Moon, the power of Red Moon grows every day, causing troubles in the academy. Much to their dismay, Lapis is going too far on executing the Red Moon's plans. As Lapis tortures both Aples and the school nurse, the girls are come to a conclusion that they must stop her from taking over Jewel Land.
35	"Happiness Secret Base!"; Transliteration: "Happinesu Himitsu Kichi!" (Japanese: ハッピネス秘密基地〜！)	November 30, 2013
A Pembroke Welsh Corgi Jewelpet named Nephrite makes all Chiari and Ruby feel lovely and warm inside. As Chiari and Nephrite introduce to one another, he explains the other moon is called the Small Moon of Happiness, which has powers enough to repel the influence of the Red Moon.
36	"Baby Jewelina!"; Transliteration: "Akachan Juerīna bu!" (Japanese: 赤ちゃんジュエリーナぶ〜！)	December 7, 2013
As she cleaning the place using a vacuum, Jewelina worries about the Red Moon's powers growing. The doll bounced back and is about to hit both girls until Ruby used her magic to make it vanish, but failed as it became a huge nameko mushroom and hits them both. Ruby looked outside at the Red Moon and found out that she will become younger and younger when the timer move and disappear forever, leaving the girls in a huge pinch.
37	"I Want Friends!"; Transliteration: "Tomodachi ga Hoshī, yami!" (Japanese: 友達がほしいヤミ〜！)	December 14, 2013
Due to financial issues, Coal closes his cafe, feeling sad and worried without any job. He suddenly hears a voice and found the doll, as it spoke to him that he is amazing. Coal had no idea that Angel is actually Dorothy, the doll the little girl is searching for, and it is corrupted with the Red Moon's dark magic.
38	"Sing, Jewel Christmas!"; Transliteration: "Utau Jueru Kurisumasu!" (Japanese: 歌うジュエルクリスマス～！)	December 21, 2013
Chiari, Nene, and Ruruka are looking forward for the Christmas Party being held in the Jewelpet Cafe. As they arrive at the cafe, the Jewelpets are busy to help when Nene says that Sanada's band will perform for the event.
39	"I Forgot!"; Transliteration: "Wasurechatta yo!" (Japanese: わすれちゃったよ～！)	December 28, 2013
During New Year in Jewel Land, Ruby and her friends are happy to greet the next year. However, Garnet harshly reminds them that they still need to open their Christmas party and clean up the cafe as Sapphie told them.
40	"Jewel Defense Force Scramble~!"; Transliteration: "Jueru Bōei-tai Shutsudo~!" (Japanese: ジュエル防衛隊しゅつど～！)	January 4, 2014
Tata, a Squirrel Monkey Jewelpet, is leaving town one night due to his disappointment at not getting his own Magic Gem. He then stars at the Red Moon and gets mad, but the moon attacked him with countless rocks. Kosuke tells Ruby to use her magic once more, which increases her size as Kosuke ejects from his plane and Ruby lands on the ground. With the only way to stop Tata is through size, Ruby must take him down before it is too late.
41	"Where's my Pretty Jewelpet?"; Transliteration: "Bishōjo Juerupetto doko?" (Japanese: 美少女ジュエルペットどこ〜？)	January 11, 2014
A Beagle Jewelpet name Yuku appeared as Ruby greets him. As Angela cheers him up when Yuku told the human girls about how sad he is this winter, Yuku uses his Jewel Magic to construct a Jewelpet Cafe made of snow and ice, amusing the girls. However, Yuku does not take it well and runs away crying, not knowing that the Red Moon started to take control of him.
42	"Jewel Relay Race Go! Fight~!"; Transliteration: "Jueru Ekiden Go! Faito~!" (Japanese: ジュエル駅伝ゴー！ファイト～！)	January 18, 2014
In the academy, Azusa announced about the Relay Race next week. As their teacher tells the entire class who will participate, Sachi raises her hand and volunteers with Nene and Ruruka. Later, both of them watch the announcement of the Relay Race as Chiari tries to open the door for them to come out. Seeing Nene and Ruruka depressed, Chiari tells the others to find a way to cheer them up by joining the race. However, they both found out the race is not as easy as it looks.
43	"The Last Scene Didn't Came Out!"; Transliteration: "Rasutoshīn ga Detekonai!" (Japanese: ラストシーンが出てこない～！)	January 25, 2014
Machiko woke up one morning as she is in a hurry for school. However, in a rush, she accidentally bumped into a Jewelpet and all of her work got scattered in the air. Fortunately, the Jewelpet used his Jewel Flash Magic to gather back all of Machiko's work, and safely landed on her head. Ruby recognized him as King, a French Bulldog Jewelpet as he introduced himself to the class and Machiko is happy to see him again.
44	"It doesn't sparkle anymore~!" Transliteration: "Kirakira shinaku natsu chatta~!" (Japanese: キラキラしなくなっちゃった～！)	February 1, 2014
Sapphie is busy decorating a cake for Marie's Birthday with Rossa finishes the decoration with a ribbon. The girls checked in and see how pretty it is and checked that everything is okay. The girls were surprised to see the box stolen as Alex used his Jewel Flash magic and transformed the Magic Gems into their own clothing. As they told the girls their plan to steal the Jewel Box in the beginning, Marie was very annoyed on how they behave while they have to stop them from causing trouble.
45	"Valentine's Day Roll~ing!"; Transliteration: "Barentaindē go~ro-goro!" (Japanese: バレンタインデーご～ろごろ！)	February 8, 2014
It is Valentine's Day in Jewel Land as everyone in Jewel Academy was now making Chocolates for the one they love the most. The Jewelpets were in the cooking class with Chiari and the others as they learn how to make Valentine chocolate. With Angela's chocolate tied into a string, she and the others are trying to find Takumi until they encountered Kosuke along the way. As they recovered, Chiari is saddened that the cookies meant for Kosuke is ruined as they then look at the ball and saw it was Takumi. With Angela broken on what happened on Takumi, they all must find out how will they turn him back to normal.
46	"EK Men! Ba-Kyu~n!"; Transliteration: "EK Menzu! Bakyu~n!" (Japanese: EKメンズ！ばきゅ～ん！)	February 15, 2014
At Jewelpet Cafe, Jewelpets presented the girls the Valentines chocolate they all received as Chiari, Nene and Ruruka discussed about graduation. Seeing that they will miss each other, Ruby told her that she should spend some more time with Kosuke. On the other hand, Nene, Ruruka, and Sapphie were busy searching for Takumi until they heard Angela crying. They all went to where she is and found Takumi, all dressed up in an Alpaca costume as he said harsh words to Angela to pet her. Jewelina is well aware of this situation and stated that the Red Moon has gone too far on manipulating the boys and everyone's happiness.
47	"Black Jewel Castle Desu!"; Transliteration: "Burakkujueru-jō yoidesu!" (Japanese: ブラックジュエル城よいです！)	February 22, 2014
Chiari and the others failed to turn the quartet back to normal due to the powerful influence of the Red Moon. The next day, Rossa is busy changing the lightbulbs inside the Jewelpet cafe until she got a visit from the EK Mens, somewhat trying to treat her with royalty. However, things are going worse as the EK Mens makes another move and a powerful wave of Unhappiness Energy is being collected. Chiari has no options left to snap Kosuke and the others back to normal, and may think she won't have any hope on saving everyone.
48	"Someone came from Outer Space~!"; Transliteration: "Uchū kara dare ka kita~!" (Japanese: 宇宙から誰か来た～！)	March 1, 2014
Jewelina accidentally landed on the Small Moon of Happiness as she was now chasing a mysterious person that she saw. The real Kosuke was notified about their plans and decided to plan a counterattack and steal the flying saucer from them in disguise. Jewelina, on the other hand, is still following the mysterious person inside the cave.
49	"Unhappiness sukapo~n!" Transliteration: "Anhappinesu de sukapo~n!" (Japanese: アンハッピネスでスカポ～ン！)	March 8, 2014
Due to an accident in the last episode, Sapphie has been possessed by the Unhappiness aura after fixing Granite's spaceship. Back at Jewel Land, the girls are finally in the Castle thought they noticed that the main door is locked shut, and no sign of Marie and her group. The girls decided to go inside the castle through the door but unknown to them, a deadly trap awaits.
50	"I'll Protect the Happiness!"; Transliteration: "Happinesu wa watashi ga mamoru gā!" (Japanese: ハッピネスはわたしが守るガー！)	March 15, 2014
Garnet is determined on her part as she is cleaning the cafe's floors and busy with all the chores. Just then, Garnet encounters the EK Mens as she didn't notice the Red Moon had cast a spell to corrupt her. At the dormitory, Chiari and the others are worried that the Unhappiness is starting to affect everyone's personality. However, Garnet activated the trap door, sending Marie and the others to an underground Jewel production plant. Kōsuke appears and finally reveal his true plans.
51	"Chiari Transforms~!"; Transliteration: "Chiari ga henshin shita~!" (Japanese: ちありが変身した～！)	March 22, 2014
As hope is beyond their reach, Chiari is saddened on what happened to her closest friends and everyone's Unhappiness is overwhelming everyone's desires while Ruby tries to cheer her up and convince her that it is not too late. Chiari herself understands and convinces everyone to be happy and be free from the Unhappiness. However, her words didn't reach her, especially her friends as they tear her apart before Ruby teleports them out. Kosuke knew this would happen and the fact that Ruby is getting in the way in his plans, as he decided to eradicate both of them at once.
52	"Laughing Together, that's Happiness!"; Transliteration: "Warai attara happinesu!" (Japanese: 笑い合ったらハッピネス！)	March 29, 2014
At the Red Moon, she saw Ruby fully corrupted by the Red Moon's magic as well as Kosuke who is waiting for her. She tried to convince Kosuke that his smile is gone, and wanted to see it once again and bring back the laughter inside his heart. Kosuke refuses this as he laughed maniacally and fuses with the Red Moon, destroying the temple itself. After the battle, they all look at a strange mirror that has a graffiti on it, similar to the Red Moon's face. This was the mirror representing the Red Moon, as Ruby is shocked seeing it. As they all about to find the real culprit on the graffiti, Ruby decides to admit everything.
