= 2014 in Japanese television =

Events in 2014 in Japanese television.

== Debuts ==
Start date	Show	Channel	Type	Source				
January 12	Tesagure! Bukatsu-mono Encore	NTV	Anime					
February 2	Happiness Charge PreCure!	ABC TV	Anime					
February 16	Ressha Sentai ToQger	TV Asahi	Tokusatsu		April 3	Go-Go Tamagotchi!	TV Tokyo	Anime
April 4	JoJo's Bizarre Adventure: Stardust Crusaders	Tokyo MX	Anime					
April 5	Lady Jewelpet	TV Tokyo	Anime					
April 6	Yu-Gi-Oh! Arc-V	TV Tokyo	Anime					
April	No Game No Life	AT-X, Tokyo MX, Sun TV, KBS, TV Aichi, BS11	Anime					
April	Soredemo Sekai wa Utsukushii	NTV, FBS, STV, CTV, SUN	Anime					
April	Selector Infected WIXOSS	Tokyo MX	Anime					
July 2	Bakumatsu Rock	Tokyo MX; BS11	Anime					
July 3	Glasslip	Tokyo MX, AT-X	Anime					
July 5	Aldnoah.Zero	Tokyo MX; BS11; Tochigi TV; Gunma TV	Anime					
July 6	PriPara	TV Tokyo	Anime					
July 10	Persona 4: The Golden Animation	MBS, TBS, CBC, BS-TBS	Anime					
July 15	Ultraman Ginga S	TV Tokyo	Tokusatsu					
October 5	Kamen Rider Drive	TV Asahi	Tokusatsu					

== Ongoing ==
- Music Fair, music (1964–present)
- Mito Kōmon, jidaigeki (1969-2011)
- Sazae-san, anime (1969–present)
- FNS Music Festival, music (1974–present)
- Panel Quiz Attack 25, game show (1975–present)
- Soreike! Anpanman. anime (1988–present)
- Downtown no Gaki no Tsukai ya Arahende!!, game show (1989–present)
- Crayon Shin-chan, anime (1992–present)
- Nintama Rantarō, anime (1993–present)
- Chibi Maruko-chan, anime (1995–present)
- Detective Conan, anime (1996–present)
- SASUKE, sports (1997–present)
- Ojarumaru, anime (1998–present)
- One Piece, anime (1999–present)
- Doraemon, anime (2005–present)
- Naruto Shippuden, anime (2007–2017)
- Shimajirō no Wow!, anime/children's variety (2012-present)
- Aikatsu!, anime (2012-2016)
- Pocket Monsters XY, anime (2013–2016)

== Returning Series ==
- Dragon Ball Kai, anime (2014-2015)
- Fairy Tail, anime (2014-2016, 2018-2019)

== New Series ==
- Sailor Moon Crystal, ONA (2014-2015)

== Ended ==
- Saint Seiya Omega, anime (2012-2014)
- Toriko, anime (2011-2014)
- Hunter x Hunter, anime (2011-2014)
- Domoto Kyodai, music (2000-2014)
- Yu-Gi-Oh! ZEXAL II, anime (2012-2014)
- DokiDoki! PreCure, anime (2013-2014)
- Jewelpet Happiness, anime (2013-2014)
- Tamagotchi! Miracle Friends, anime (2013-2014)
- Zyuden Sentai Kyoryuger, tokusatsu (2013-2014)
- Waratte Iitomo, variety (1982-2014)

== Deaths ==
Date	Name	Age	Notability	Source
Jan. 17	Seizō Katō	86	Actor and voice actor, was the dub voice for Megatron and later Galvatron in The Transformers and also played him in Transformers: The Headmasters	

== See also ==
- 2014 in anime
- 2014 Japanese television dramas
- 2014 in Japan
- 2014 in Japanese music
- List of Japanese films of 2014
