= Lady Jewelpet =

Japanese anime television series

- Cover for the DVD Boxset

レディ ジュエルペット (Redi Juerupetto)
- Genre: Magical girl
- Anime television series
- Directed by: Itsuro Kawasaki
- Produced by: Aya Yoshino; Hideyuki Kachi; Ryōsuke Ōno
- Written by: Natsuko Takahashi
- Music by: Jun Ichikawa
- Studio: Studio Comet; Zexcs
- Original network: TXN (TV Tokyo, TV Osaka)
- Original run: April 5, 2014 – March 28, 2015
- Episodes: 52
- Manga
- Written by: Mako Morie
- Published by: Shogakukan
- Magazine: Pucchigumi
- Original run: April 2014 – March 2015

Lady Jewelpet (Japanese: レディ ジュエルペット, Hepburn: Redi Juerupetto) is a Japanese anime television series animated by Studio Comet and Zexcs. It is the 6th installment in the Jewelpet anime franchise based on the characters jointly created by Sanrio and Sega Toys. It was written by Natsuko Takahashi (07-Ghost) and directed by Itsuro Kawasaki (Listen to Me, Girls. I Am Your Father!, Rental Magica). Original character designs were done by Arco Wada (Fate/Extra), while the designs for the Jewelpets, like the previous five seasons before it, are done by Tomoko Miyakawa. It aired on all TXN stations in Japan from April 5, 2014, to March 28, 2015, replacing Jewelpet Happiness in its initial time slot. Lady Jewelpet aired as part of the franchise's 5th anniversary on television and is also the only installment to be officially handled by Zexcs.

== Story ==
Momona is an ordinary middle high school girl hailing from Jewel Land, living her normal life with her family who owns a bakery. At her cousin's wedding, she envies the bride, Lady Diana, due to the fact that she is marrying her cousin who she considers her source of inspiration. However, once she sees Lady Diana and her cousin together, Momona begins to like her, and accepts her as her cousin's bride. Just as Lady Diana is about to properly meet her and introduce herself, Momona is transported to a snowy place in Jewel Land where the ruler, Lady Jewel, is giving a speech to the Petit Ladies, girls who are chosen as Jewel Candidates to be the next Lady Jewel. Momona meets her partner and mentor, Ruby, a white rabbit, who will guide her through the tasks in becoming Lady Jewel. Whoever passes the most tasks wins and becomes the next Lady Jewel, but standing in her way is Lillian, a girl who also aims to win the title of Lady Jewel, so she can choose Cayenne, to be her King alongside her. Momona soon also begins to fall in love with Cayenne, yet Lillian doesn't want her to get to close to him.

== Characters ==
=== Petite Lady / Lady Jewel Candidates ===
Momona (ももな, Momona)
Voiced by: Keiko Kobayashi

Momona is the main protagonist of the series and an ordinary girl hailing from Jewel Land who adores her older cousin, Prince Alto. During his wedding, she cannot fully smile until she meets Lady Diana and gets transported to the Jewel Palace. She is very shy, and yet is full of determination though sometimes she gets into serious trouble. Momona is also fond of hot-dogs as well and likes sweets. Ruby is her mentor and partner and the two get along well during her stay in the Jewel Palace as a Petit Lady. Momona doesn't get along with Cayenne during her stay, though the two are developing a certain crush to each other, at a point of Lillian's jealousy. However, both of them settled their issues and Lillian will allow her to be with Cayenne, if she can prove herself to be a real lady. It is then later revealed that Ruby didn't chose her as a true Lady Candidate, but by a mysterious person who brought her into the Jewel Palace during the wedding.

Her desire on becoming a Lady Jewel is after she receives a message from Lady Diana during her first test and goes on a quest to become a Lady who is caring just like Lady Diana. Thought she doesn't have some qualities on becoming a lady herself, Ruby gives her determination on reaching her goals. She possesses both a Magical Letterpen and a Jewel Pod as proof of being a candidate, allowing her to read messages and a Jewel Pod with which she and Ruby do magic together during tests.

Before reuniting with Cayenne at the Royal Palace, Prince Romeo confesses to her and she rejects him. She doubts Cayenne's and Elena's relationships to the point of jealousy. Elena tells her the truth about what happened between Lady Diana and Luea years ago. After she and Cayenne save Jewel Land, they both fade into the light with the only remains being the ribbon tied in their arms together. Momona wakes up and has no recollection of what happened. Eventually, both Momona and Cayenne regain their memories and get married.

Lillian (リリアン, Ririan)
Voiced by: Risa Taneda

Momona's rival (now friend) and also a Petit Lady, she is the human partner of Luea. Although mysterious and very calm and ladylike, she has jealousy issues towards Momona regarding Cayenne. She can be sharp-tongued towards Momona regarding the issue while regarding Luea as her best friend and partner, also badly influenced by her due to her desire to win. Lillian is determined to do anything to get the title of Lady Jewel as well as the affection of Cayenne, as they are once soulmates destined to be apart. It's revealed that she and Cayenne are siblings and she settled her rivalry with Momona with one condition: she will allow her to be with Cayenne as long as Momona can prove herself to be a real lady. She is now developing feelings for Prince Miura, which makes Luea worry.

With her opening up her feelings towards everyone, Lillian becomes more supportive and more of a big sister figure to Momona and the others. She also has a mysterious past on which she can't remember, which links to her Jewelpet Partner; making her worry. It is later revealed that Lillian was originally Lady Diana's doll which she uses in one of her tests. However, in an unfortunate moment, she is abandoned after Lady Diana leaves the Jewel Palace and Luea, forcing her to use her magic to reanimate the said doll and bring it to life while implanting fake memories into her, explaining why Luea is so obsessed with Lillian and treats her as a doll belong to Luea. She is later revealed to be Lady X, an unregistered lady that Miura has been investigating lately. Despite all of this, Miura still loves her so much to the point of trying to protect her from her mentor. In episode 52, she becomes the next Lady Jewel.

Mizuki (みずき, Mizuki)
Voiced by: Eri Sendai

One of Momona's friends and also a Petit Lady, she is the human partner of Garnet. She thinks that she is not very feminine despite that being the truth, she is very spunky, doesn't like cute things and is more sharp-witted than the others but she herself has some bad table manners and extremely hates bugs. She is also very dependable and a supporting friend to Momona and the others. Mizuki is popular with the Lady Candidates as well.

Her desires on becoming a Lady Jewel is when she meets a Lady (believed to be Lady Boot) who saves her from getting lost in the forest, and she is determined to become one when she grows up. It is hinted that she is interested in Soarer, thought the two just remained friends. Before Momona departs to Royal Palace, Soarer gives her a diamond ring as a Christmas present at the task.

Charon (かろん, Karon)
Voiced by: Miki Shimomura

One of Momona's friends and also a Petit Lady, she is the human partner of Sapphie. Somehow timid, she is nice and kind-hearted to people, especially to her friends, but focuses more on her studies. She usually gets along with Mizuki and Momona while Sapphie inspires her to do her best for her to be a Lady. Charon also loves novels and wants to be a novelist when she grows up. She has an older sister named Ellis. Charon's desire on becoming a Lady is born after she met Sapphie for the first time and became her partner, telling her it's not bad to follow her dreams and that she can be a wonderful heroine like the one in the book she read when she was a kid.

She isn't aware of Levin's feelings for her as every time when they're in a task, she would only focus on the task and not his feelings. Later in the story, Levin proposed to her to be his lady and later she accepted his marriage proposal in the Jewel Festival.

Elena (エレナ, Erena)
Voiced by: Mikako Takahashi

A Petit Lady who is currently studying in the Royal Palace, she is the human partner of Rosa. A very mysterious lady, she is very gifted and calm-minded and supportive towards Momona. She also has a good sense of justice and is good on fortune telling using Tarot cards. Elena also excels in every curriculum in the Jewel Palace, despite her elegant appearance and is very suspicious about the strange incidents revolving around the Jewel Palace, especially the attacks. Usually working alongside Cayenne, she is shown to be powerful magic-wise. At the later episodes, Romeo develops a crush towards her. In episode 52, she becomes the next educator of the next petite ladies.

=== Prince Candidates ===
Cayenne (カイエン, Kaien)
Voiced by: Kenji Nojima, Miyuki Sawashiro (Younger)

One of Jewel Land's prince candidates, he is the first prince Momona met during her trial. His looks are entirely similar to Momona's cousin, but is very different in personality. He is very supportive towards Momona and helps her in any way possible, but sometimes he doesn't regard her as a lady at all. He is also very focused on his studies, especially on the fact he's chosen to study at the Royal Palace to be King. Momona has some issues with him during their first kiss, soon developing a relationship with each other while Lillian has a crush on him to the point of her jealousy to Momona.

It's later revealed that Lillian and Cayenne are soulmates destined to be apart, and later revealed to be siblings. However this is revealed to be false, as he doesn't really have a younger sibling in the first place and he and Lillian are not related. In episode 15, he revealed his true love to Momona, before departing to the Royal Palace. Later in the series, he finally reappears alongside a mysterious lady who warns Momona and the others about the strange dark presence at work.

Reunited with Momona, Cayenne has been suspicious at how Miura knows a few things and discovered that Miura is investigating about Lillian. Cayenne, probably seems to know the truth about Lillian. Knowing the truth from his eyes, he still accepts her as her sister. After he and Momona saved Jewel Land, they both faded into the light with the only remains being the ribbon that was tied in their arms together, they are taken back to their home, but both of them lose their memories of Jewel Land and of each other. However, fate brought them back together through Ruby and both Cayenne and Momona restarted their relationship which eventually led to them getting married in the final episode. His name is based on the Porsche Cayenne.

Romeo (ロメオ, Romeo)
Voiced by: Takashi Kondo

The most wisest and popular of all the Prince Candidates, Romeo is the rival of Cayenne of becoming king. He is very gentleman-like towards the ladies and also competitive towards Cayenne, though the two of them get along together well. He also looks up onto Momona and the other Petit Ladies and has high remarks in some skills, but has a slight bitter relationship with Miura.

Before Momona departs to Royal Palace, he confessed his love to her at the task but was rejected. Just after the task, Romeo has been manipulated by Luea's magic, yet it seemed to go out of control and attacked everyone at the garden. However, Romeo, fighting for justice managed to win against the dark magic and was admitted to go to the Royal Palace along with Prince Miura. His name is based on the car manufacturer Alfa Romeo.

Levin (レビン, Rebin)
Voiced by: Miyuki Sawashiro

The youngest of all the prince candidates. He is very cheerful, smart yet more arrogant than the other princes. He sometimes teases Cayenne about his relationship with Momona and has a crush on Charon. However, she never notices his feelings for her in the series. As the series goes, the two became closer to each other and later he admits his feelings to Charon. At the Jewel Festival, he proposed to Charon to be her boyfriend on which she accepts. His name is based on the Toyota Corolla Levin.

Soarer (ソアラ, Soara)
Voiced by: Seiichirō Yamashita

The most analytical of all the princes, Soarer is the last of the Prince Candidates. He is very calm yet smart and often analyzes his surroundings during each Lady Exams he's in. He is also very good on fencing and Mizuki has an interest towards him.

During one of the tasks before Momona, Lillian, Romeo and Miura departed to the Royal Palace, he gave Mizuki a diamond ring as a Christmas present. His name is based on the Toyota Soarer.

Miura (ミウラ, Miura)
Voiced by: KENN

A mysterious prince candidate who is locked up in a room for unknown reasons, and got transferred to the Jewel Palace after Cayenne left. Though how he got locked up in the first place is due to his misbehavior, his overall identity is shrouded in mystery even to the Petit Ladies. He is very calm yet sharp witted and likes to provoke people. He comes on to Momona a lot, though his motives is not clear to her. It's later revealed that the reason why he's confined in the first place is due that even though he scored high in the exams, he did something wrong and forced him to be locked away. Lillian starts to fall in love with him, causing Luea to worry.

Despite being very intimidating, he is rather nice and sometimes keeps secrets surrounding both Momona and Lillian. He is seen with his red Jewel Pad which has an artificial intelligence system called Iota installed in it, in which he tells Miura about the relationship of each Petit Ladies and plans in order to achieve his goal on becoming King.

He is investigating the unregistered lady and Lillian's background. He is quite shocked about the truth that Lilian is the unregistered lady he has been investigating. Miura starts to fall in love with Lillian, and sometimes he blushed over Lillian. Eventually they both admit their love and share their first kiss in episode 50. In episode 52, he becomes the next King. Miura's name is based on the Lamborghini Miura.

=== Jewel Palace/Royal Palace ===
Claire (クレア, Kurea)
Voiced by: Aya Hirano

The current holder of the Lady Jewel (レディ・ジュlエル, Redi jueru) title and Ruler of Jewel Land, Claire is a close friend of Diana during her early days. She is a supportive figure towards the denizens of Jewel Land and all the Petit Ladies and Prince Candidates. During her younger days, she and Diana were very close friends and both exceeded in being top ladies. However, when Lady Diana ran away, she is requested to take on the title as she loved Alto and would not marry someone else. She usually gives the Candidates their test through messages, which uses the Magical Letterpen to project.

Boot (ブート, Būto)
Voiced by: Miyuki Sawashiro

Also a caretaker of the Jewel Palace, Lady Boot is an optimistic but tomboyish lady who wears military clothing. She is also known as a Lady Conductor, instructing the Petit Ladies with their next test. She also doesn't like using parasols and usually likes the rain, also believing that she's the one who saved Mizuki when she was young. Boot was also a previous Lady Candidate as well during her younger days.

King Crown (キングクラウン, Kingu Kuraun)
Voiced by: Jun Fukuyama

The current king of Jewel Land and also Claire's husband.

=== Other characters ===
Diana (ダイアナ, Daiana)
Voiced by: Aki Toyosaki

Momona's sister-in-law, Diana is the wife of Prince Alto and the one who suggested Momona to be a Lady Jewel candidate. She was originally Luea's human partner a few years ago, and was also the Top Lady alongside Claire. She also loved Alto very much in the point of his marriage proposal to her that made her happy. However, when Alto dropped out on being a candidate, she pleaded Claire to be Lady Jewel because she loves him, and will not become Lady Jewel if she ends up with another guy. After she ran away, she left Luea and her prized doll behind, causing her to be depressed and become very bitter over the years.

Alto (アルト, Aruto)
Voiced by: Ryūichi Kijima

Momona's older cousin and Lady Diana's husband, Prince Alto is a former Prince Candidate who she longs for. Before the beginning of the series, Alto proposed to Diana during their date despite him being not a good prince and both had an eternal oath together in the Music Box Museum in the Jewel Mountain, also obtaining a Music Box that Luea had hidden years ago. However, Alto doesn't have the qualities on being King and he dropped out, forcing Diana to drop out and ran away with him.

Iota (イオタ, Iota)

Iota is an Artificial Intelligence entity and Miura's assistant. He resides inside his Jewel Pad as a researcher who searches for clues linked to the main characters, which would give him an advantage in exams. His human-like form appeared in Episode 33.

Ellis (えりす, Erisu)
Voiced by: Eriko Nakamura

Charon's older sister.

Bad Badtz-Maru (バッドばつ丸, Baddo batsu maru)
Voiced by: Ikue Ōtani

A character appearing in Lady Jewelpet Magical Musical, he is a male penguin with spiky hair and an employee of Sanrio Puroland in Tama New Town, Tokyo. Though pretty impulsive, he usually guides Momona and the others while they're in the human world while searching for a way to go back to Jewel Land. He ends his speeches with "~da ze!"

=== Antagonists ===
Rector (レクター, Rekutā) / Joker (ジョーカー, Jōkā)
Voiced by: Miyuki Sawashiro

One of the main antagonists, Rector is one of the caretakers of the Jewel Palace and also Larimar's human partner. She is a graceful and yet elegant lady who takes care of the Petit Ladies on their stay in the palace. In her younger days, Rector was one of the previous Petit Ladies who admired Lady Diana for being the Top Lady, and strived to be on her rank. When the next Lady Jewel was elected, she became the caretaker of the Jewel Palace. She has a caring but stern personality towards the ladies and serves as a messenger to Lady Jewel, using her Magical Letterpen to project every exam Lady Jewel gave to the Lady Candidates.

However behind her elegant look, she also stays in the shadows and disguise, taking on the role as Joker. As Joker she gives Luea orders for her agenda, and lead to Lillian coming to life as a Lady Jewel Candidate. She also uses Luea's Jewel Pad in order to cause havoc around the Jewel Palace in order to be closer to her goal on controlling the Door of Chaos. However, in truth, she is saddened due to that Diana became the Top Lady and almost became depressed after Alto and Diana ran away and Claire became Lady Jewel, making her vengeful yet regretful. She died after a strange dark shadow possessed her and tried to use the Final Wand, but she stabbed herself before it can do so, as she collapsed and faded into the light.

Beasts (ビースト, Bīsuto)

The true main antagonists, these are monsters that originate from the Door Of Chaos that represent human sadness and despair.

== Production ==
Lady Jewelpet was first revealed in a series of tweets from the official Jewelpet 5th anniversary Twitter account on February 12, 2014. Sanrio teased a new series that will air in April 2014. The title of the anime was later revealed on February 13, 2014, alongside the opening of the Lady's official website, which contains information about its premise. The March 2014 issue of Pucchigumi revealed more information about Lady Jewelpet, especially Momona and the 41st Jewelpet in the franchise, named Luea.

This is the first anime based on the Jewelpet franchise to be mainly handled by animation Studio Zexcs, ending Studio Comet's 5 year production run for the anime series. Comet is still co-producing the program with Zexcs, the first time since the Jewelpet Twinkle OVA. Lady Jewelpet is considered the darkest entry in the franchise, tackling more mature and adult themes such as betrayal, trust, secrets and lies, and the effects these issues have on the characters and the overall storyline.

== Media ==
=== Anime ===
Lady Jewelpet premiered April 5, 2014, on all TXN stations, including TV Tokyo and TV Osaka at 9:30 a.m on Saturdays, replacing Jewelpet Happiness in its initial time slot. It is also the first Jewelpet series to be officially streamed on the Mobile App service, Kids d which is managed by NTT Docomo.

An official DVD boxset of the series, containing all the episodes, was released by Frontier Works on July 7, 2015. The boxset also contains official character art, information on the characters and extra bonuses.

==== Music ====
The music is composed by Jun Ichikawa (Rental Magica). The series uses two pieces of theme music, one opening theme and one ending theme. The opening song is titled Your Love by M-Three while the ending song is titled Run with U by Fairies. The Opening theme single was officially released on July 30, 2014.

=== Manga ===
A manga adaptation by Mako Morie was serialized in Shogakukan's Pucchigumi magazine from April 2014 to March 2015.

=== Musical ===
A musical, titled Lady Jewelpet Magical Musical ~Birth! Little Lady Jewel~ (レディジュエルペットの魔法のミュージカル ～誕生！リトルレディジュエル～, Redi juerupetto no mahō no myūjikaru ~tanjō! Ritoruredijueru~), officially debut at Sanrio Puroland in July 2014. Toru Hosokawa, who wrote the TV drama Ojīsan Sensei directed and wrote the musical.
