= Jewelpet (TV series) =

2009 anime

- Cover of the last DVD volume of the first series

ジュエルペット (Juerupetto)
- Genre: Magical girl
- Created by: Sanrio and Sega Toys
- Anime television series
- Directed by: Nanako Sasaki
- Produced by: Kazuya Watanabe
- Written by: Atsushi Maekawa
- Music by: Shirō Hamaguchi
- Studio: Studio Comet
- Licensed by: Crunchyroll SAS
- Original network: TXN (TV Osaka, TV Tokyo)
- English network: HK: TVB; PH: Cartoon Network
- Original run: 5 April 2009 – 28 March 2010
- Episodes: 52
Further information
Manga
Written by	Mako Morie
Published by	Shogakukan
Magazine	Pucchigumi
Original run	April 2009 – March 2014
Manga
Written by	Sayuri Tatsuyama
Published by	Shogakukan
Magazine	Ciao
Original run	February 2010 – September 2010
Anime television series
Jewelpet Twinkle☆
Directed by	Takashi Yamamoto
Produced by	Hideyuki Kachi
Written by	Michiru Shimada
Music by	Shirō Hamaguchi
Studio	Studio Comet; Zexcs (OVA)
Licensed by	Crunchyroll SAS
Original network	TXN (TV Tokyo)
English network	HK: TVB
Original run	3 April 2010 – 21 July 2013
Episodes	52 + 1 OVA
Anime television series
Jewelpet Sunshine
Directed by	Takayuki Inagaki
Produced by	Hideyuki Kachi; Ryosuke Ono
Written by	Yūko Kakihara
Music by	Shirō Hamaguchi
Studio	Studio Comet
Original network	TXN (TV Tokyo)
English network	HK: TVB
Original run	9 April 2011 – 31 March 2012
Episodes	52
Anime television series
Jewelpet Kira☆Deco!
Directed by	Makoto Moriwaki
Produced by	Hideyuki Kachi; Ryosuke Ono
Written by	Kazuyuki Fudeyasu
Music by	Cher Watanabe
Studio	Studio Comet
Original network	TXN (TV Tokyo)
English network	HK: TVB
Original run	7 April 2012 – 30 March 2013
Episodes	52
Novel
Jewelpet: The Fuss in the Jewel Festival!?
Written by	Hiroko Kanasugi
Illustrated by	POP
Published by	Kadokawa Shoten
Imprint	Tsubasa Bunko
Published	11 May 2012
Anime film
Jewelpet the Movie: Sweets Dance Princess
Directed by	Hiroaki Sakurai
Written by	Takashi Yamada
Music by	Wataru Maeguchi
Studio	Studio Comet; Toho
Released	August 11, 2012
Runtime	63 minutes
Anime television series
Jewelpet Happiness
Directed by	Hiroaki Sakurai
Produced by	Hideyuki Kachi; Ryosuke Ono
Music by	Wataru Maeguchi
Studio	Studio Comet
Original network	TXN (TV Tokyo)
English network	HK: TVB
Original run	6 April 2013 – 29 March 2014
Episodes	52
Original net animation
Jewelpet Attack Chance!?
Directed by	Fumikazu Satou
Music by	Nowa; Hiroyuki Koudzu
Studio	AIC Project
Licensed by	YouTube
Released	18 February 2016 – 31 May 2016
Runtime	4 minutes
Anime film
Jewelpet Attack Travel!
Directed by	Hiroshi Negishi
Written by	Kanichi Katou
Music by	Shingo Nishimura
Studio	Ashi Productions
Released	14 May 2022
Runtime	23 minutes
See Also
Lady Jewelpet (2014); Jewelpet: Magical Change (2015)

Jewelpet (Japanese: ジュエルペット, Hepburn: Juerupetto), also called Jewel Pets, is a 2009 Japanese fantasy anime series produced by Studio Comet, based on the Jewelpet franchise jointly created by Sanrio and Sega Sammy Holdings. The series was written by Atsushi Maekawa (Digimon Adventure 02, Bakugan Battle Brawlers, Fresh Pretty Cure!) with direction from Nanako Sasaki, screenplay by Takashi Yamada (Yumeiro Pâtissière), and produced by Kazuya Watanabe (Onegai My Melody) with character designs from Tomoko Miyakawa. It aired on TV Osaka and TV Tokyo from 5 April 2009 to 26 March 2010, replacing Onegai My Melody Kirara★ in its initial timeslot before HeartCatch Pretty Cure! and The Octonauts.

Jewelpet marks as Studio Comet's second animation work based on a Sanrio franchise. The series is noted to have a unique storyline, characters and elements revolving around Magic, Witches and Alchemy. The anime expanded into six more series, one movie, three official shojo manga adaptations, one official Light Novel and various Stage Plays, also moving from its previous broadcaster TV Osaka to TV Tokyo. Each series were completely separate season to season, featuring different characters and storylines.

Crunchyroll SAS (formerly Viz Media Europe) currently licensed both the first series and Twinkle in Europe. Unlike other Sanrio series, it was never released in the United States.

== Overview ==
The anime series began first with the first series in 2009, which mainly focuses on Rinko Kougyoku as the main heroine. As soon as its official ending in 2010, several sequels came out. All 7 anime series were different to each other, focusing on specific human characters as well as the main Jewelpet mascot, Ruby. The stories on all story arcs are completely different but sometimes makes certain references from each season.

=== Setting ===
The entire anime franchise are majorly both set in two worlds: Jewel Land and Earth, on which both worlds co-exist together in secrecy. Jewel Land is described itself a world where all magicians and Jewelpets live, with the Pets attending the Magic Academy to study magic and Alchemy in hopes to graduate into a full-fledged magician. Each location in Jewel Land however differs between each series, creating different canonical universes.

Earth is also the series's main setting on which the humans live. However, only a few human beings other than the main protagonists know about Jewel Land's existence throughout each season when discovering the Jewelpets. Sometimes Earth is not mentioned in the later series, though officially shown in some episodes.

=== Plot ===
Jewelpet

In the magical world of Jewel Land, three magicians turned the Jewelpets into Jewel Charms so they could rest calmly in the Dream Forest while cleaning the town, with the exception of Ruby, a white rabbit who likes to goof off. But during the pelican's delivery of the charms in the forest, a strong wind blew him off, causing the Jewel Charms to scatter all across Takaragaseki City on Earth. Ruby, now being punished, is sent to Earth to retrieve her friends. On Earth, a student named Rinko Kougyoku along with her friend Minami saw a group of shooting stars, not knowing that the pets were scattered in the city they live in. After that, Rinko was on her balcony observing the night sky and saw one pink shooting star and fell into her water glass and became a Red Jewel Charm. The next day, she and her friend goes to the jewelry store to examine the jewel, but then got into a jewelry store robbery. They were saved by a boy named Keigo Tatewaki and saw the red jewel Rinko has. He then explained to them that he was working for a special organization which is linked to the great magicians of Jewel Land and told them about the Jewelpets and also told them that all of them were scattered all over town. Rinko accepted the offer on gather all the Jewelpets back to Jewel Land and awakened Ruby using the Jewel Pocketbook. Now teaming up with Minami and Aoi, it is now their task to gather all the Jewelpets together and take them back to Jewel Land before an evil Jewelpet named Diana finds them first.

Jewelpet Twinkle☆

In Jewel Land, Jewelpets, a group of animals who have the natural ability to use magic lived in harmony with the Magicians attending the Magic Academy to learn how to use magic with their Jewel Eyes. However Ruby, a white Japanese Hare whose magic sometimes fails, is appointed to go to the Human World to search for a partner whose feelings of her heart matches hers. But when she uses the card that the magicians give her, she is sent to the Human World by accident. There, a girl named Akari Sakura meets her on the beach on her way to school. At first, Akari can't understand her due to her Jewel Land Language, but Ruby eats a special candy so she can speak and understand human language. As the day passes, Ruby knows about her problems in school and later apologized, saying that she didn't know Akari's personal problems as she tries to cheer her up. As Akari accepts Ruby, a Jewel Charm appears on her hand and she realizes that she was chosen by Ruby to be her partner. After that, she decides to become a student in Jewel Land along with Ruby as they are aiming to collect 12 Jewel Stones get into the Jewel Star Grand Prix. The prize is that three of any wish they want will be granted.

Jewelpet Sunshine

Jewel Land is a magical place where creatures known as Jewelpets, live. Part of Jewel Land is the Sunshine Academy, a school where both Humans and Jewelpets attend to study in high school. Ruby, a white Japanese hare Jewelpet studied in the infamous Class 3 Plum Section of the academy along with her friends, especially her classmate and roommate Kanon Mizushirou. Thought they were known as the "Class of Lost Causes", they all dream on graduating on the academy and pursuing through their dreams, despite the class' dysfunctional behavior and antics. Ruby and her classmates must do everything they could to graduate, endure a lot of tests and situations thrown to them and for Ruby, endure her annoying roommate Kanon, sticking together through thick and thin and trying to win the heart of her one and only crush, Mikage Shiraishi.

Jewelpet Kira☆Deco!

In the Legends of Jewel Land, the Jewelpets were born from the love and caring of their queen, Jewelina. However, a strange meteor crashes into the Mirror Ball, destroying it into a million pieces and its fragments called "Deco Stones" were all scattered in Jewel Land. In the present time, Ruby, a Rabbit Jewelpet and owner of the Kira Kira Shop, has a thing on sparkly decorations and loves to collect anything that sparkles and shines. Thought her friends Garnet and Sapphie sometimes thinks that she's strange in some points. However, when she and the others learn about the legend of the Mirror Ball and the Deco Stones, they all decided to go and search for them, until they all meet 5 strange individuals called the KiraDeco 5. The group also has the same goal on wanting to collect the Deco Stones and they befriended the Jewelpets, especially to one of their members: Pink Oomiya. Now, the group need to gather all the Deco Stones and stop the Eternal Darkness from taking over the human world.

Jewelpet Happiness

One day at the magical world of Jewel Land, Lady Jewelina entrusted Ruby the Magical Jewel Box with a mission to make friends and collect Magic Jewels. At the same time she needs to attend the Jewel Academy to do so and open a shop called the Jewelpet Café. However, with her friends, things didn't go well as expected as the cafe is considered abandoned and needs a lot of work for them to prosper and to reach that goal Ruby is expecting. But when she met three middle school student named Chiari Tsukikage, Nene Konoe and Ruruka Hanayama, she decides to make friends with then and accepted their help on managing the Jewelpet Cafe. Now, she and her friends now must work together for the cafe to prosper, stick together through good and bad luck as well as protecting the Jewel Box from being stolen.

The Fuss at the Jewel Festival

Jewel Land is a mysterious and magical place where all Jewelpets, animals gifted with Jewel Eyes, live. One day, Ruby is busy preparing for this year's Jewel Festival which will be held in her town. But in the midst of the preparations, a new person moves to town and decides to live with Ruby. Calling herself Lolip, Ruby is unsure if she is a Jewelpet due to her lack of magic skills but she decides to be friends with her during her stay. As the festivities in the upcoming festival are going smoothly, Lolip is having problems helping everyone in the festival due to her lack of any magic skills. However, is this enough for her to know who she really is and to find her own place?

== Development and production ==
Jewelpet

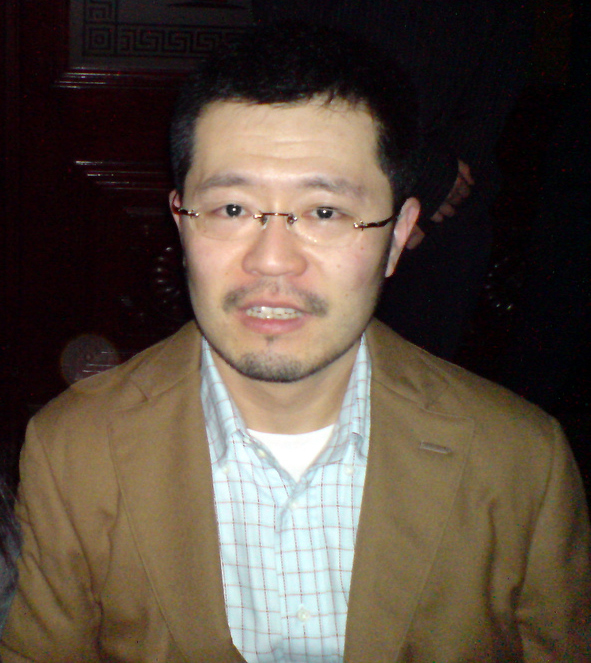
Shiro Hamaguchi, composer of One Piece, also composed the songs for the series.

The anime's production was first green-lighted in 2008 and was announced during the 2009 Tokyo Toy Forum on 14 January 2009 to coincide with the franchise's release. Sanrio first contacted Studio Comet if they can make another anime based on their characters, as Onegai My Melody Kirara★ was approaching its conclusion. The studio agreed to do an animated adaptation of the Jewelpet toy line.

Early pitching of the anime didn't involve the Human World at that time and only involves both the Jewel Charms and Jewel Land. Another insetting about the early story pitch is that the main characters are all witches all searching for the Jewelpets and trying to stop the Dark Magic, which is a similar concept to Studio Comet's previous Sanrio anime, Onegai My Melody. During the pitch, the main Jewelpet, Ruby is meant to be polite and tidy character wise. Though Sanrio and Sega decided to alter her personality into a scatterbrained but naughty character, which is reflected by the Jewel she is based on. These changes were also made in the other characters in the franchise, though their birthdate is not changed.

The series underwent several development phases to explore and work on the series with the collaboration from Sega and Sanrio with several new voice actors were hired to voice the main characters including the former Morning Musume member Kamei Eri and AKINA. Promotions of the series were also made and it is meant for the young demographic similar to Onegai My Melody.

Several trailers were aired during the ending episodes of Onegai My Melody Kirara★, before it officially aired on 5 April 2009 and ended its broadcast on 28 March 2010.

The series was moderately received during its broadcast in the Kanto Area, being overshadowed by both Dragon Ball Kai and One Piece in terms of ratings. However, with the Jewelpet merchandise already being popular, Sanrio decided to expand the Jewelpet franchise overseas to get the target sale of 5 Billion Yen. The company however earned 6 billion yen in sales due to the anime's popularity, which boosted the franchise greatly that time.

Jewelpet Twinkle

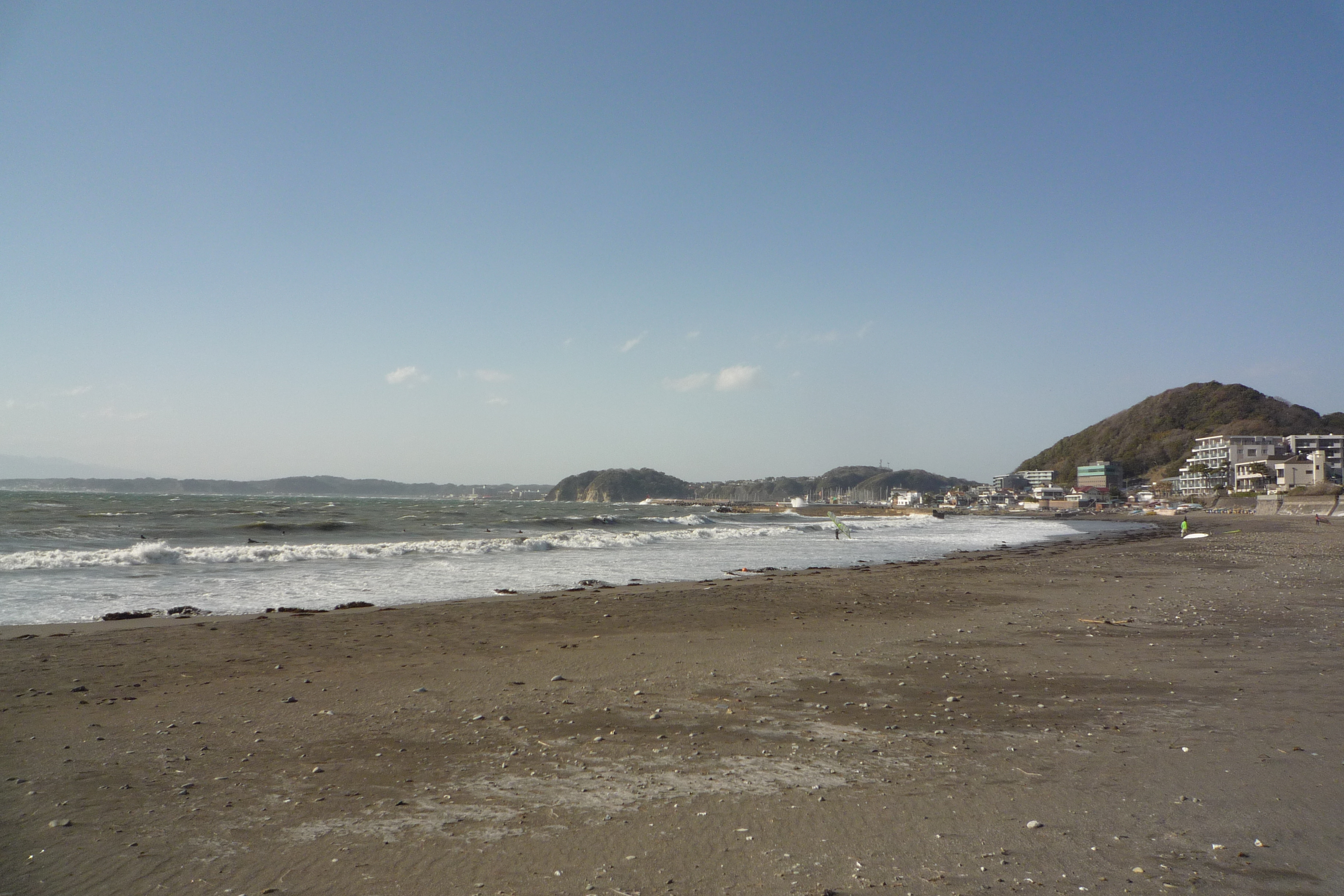
The coast of Hayama, Kanagawa, on where one of the second series' key scenes were based on

Development of Jewelpet Twinkle began in late 2009 during the first series's airing. Seeing the moderate success of the first series, Sanrio decided to ask Studio Comet to make a second series with a fresh new storyline. During the development, the company decided to change the schedule of the anime from Sunday to Saturday, but retained the airtime and also switched stations from TV Osaka to TV Tokyo.

Newer concepts were also brought into the series such as the use of Jewel Charms as magical items, a different take on casting magic spells on both humans and Jewelpets and introductions to newer character designs that will fit with the storyline. Also, rather than a sequel to the first series, the second is more of a reboot but also referencing concepts from the older series. Twinkle heavily use the concept of the Magic Academy, where Jewelpets study to become full pledge magicians, while incorporating things related to real life schools and academies and is heavily magic-oriented but very serious story-wise.

Location wise, the hometown of Akari Sakura, the series's main human protagonist is based on the town of Hayama, Kanagawa. The production staff went to the place and used it as inspiration for the Anime's setting. These locations in Hayama that's recreated in the anime includes the bus stop near the coast of Hayama and the staircase leading to the Hayama Imperial Villa. Other locations in the said town were also recreated in the anime like the Morito Beach, where Ruby and Akari first met.

Staff from the previous series were brought in to aid into the production of the anime, with the inclusion of Michiru Shimada, Yukiko Ibe and Takashi Yamamoto, who previously worked on the anime adaptation of Nanatsuiro Drops. Takashi Yamada and Yuki Entatsu also returns to produce the anime and aid with the series's script, before Yamada moved on and produced HeartCatch PreCure!. The series debuted on 3 April 2010 and ended on 2 April 2011. Twinkle became an instant success, sales and ratings wise, making the first Sanrio Anime Series to have successful receptions on all target demographics.

Jewelpet Sunshine

Production of Jewelpet Sunshine began in late 2010. With the success of Twinkle, Sanrio and Studio Comet decided to make a third series to cater in more to a much older demographic. The School concept from the last series was adapted but was in a more contemporary setting instead of a magical academy one seen in Twinkle. But the view on how Jewel Land and Earth is seen is much more different than its previous counterparts. Takuyaki Inagaki of Muv-Luv Alternative: Total Eclipse directs the series and Yuko Kakihara of Persona 4: The Animation handles the series composition.

Another interesting concept on Sunshine is instead of a full 30-minute episode, each episode is divided into two stories, similar to Onegai My Melody Sukiri and Onegai My Melody Kirara. The slice of life and comedy format from Gin Tama is also used as an inspiration for the anime as well, which is later adapted to the fourth series, Jewelpet Kira Deco. In its story pitching, the entire series is composed of Gag Stories and is considered as a big parody in every episode. References from 1980's Japanese comedy as well as references to Japanese and Western Pop Culture, several TV shows, anime, manga and music in the 1990s, makes the series stand out more than the previous two.

Jewelpet Sunshine began airing on 9 April 2011 and ended on 31 March 2012. It received two awards in the 2011 Japanese Otaku Awards due to its unique story plot and references to 80's and 90's pop culture.

Jewelpet Kira Deco!

The fourth series began its production in late 2011. The full episodic format returns in this incarnation as well as adapting the comedy elements from Sunshine for the production of the fourth series. During that time, Shirō Hamaguchi left the production staff to focus on producing some music for the film One Piece Film: Z. During production, Cher Watanabe was hired to do the music for the fourth anime series, and switching the music recording label from Nippon Columbia to Universal Music Japan. Also, the key staff from Onegai My Melody returned to produce the series and Kazuyuki Fudeyasu, who wrote the second season of Tantei Opera Milky Holmes is in charge of the series's scripts.

The series relies heavily on Deco, an artistic design style featuring Rhinestones, which is heavily incorporated. Also, the plot is also influenced from Twinkle's magical concepts to Sunshine's gag stories. The story in the fourth series is meant to be softer than the previous 3, but has a high gag value like Sunshine. During the series's pitching, the concept of the anime involves 5 individuals got sent to Jewel Land and were appointed to search for the Deco Stones all across Jewel Land alongside the Legendary Jewelpet. Also, the episode also has a format, which has the main story plus a mini-segment.

During the anime's production, child actress Mana Ashida had sung both the opening and ending songs of the anime as well. The series premiered on 7 April 2012 and ended on 30 March 2013.

Jewelpet Happiness

The 5th series is first revealed at the March issue of Shogakukan all-girl magazine Pucchigumi. The magazine explains some details on the series's as well as the 40th Jewelpet, Rossa and will be tied in with the recently revealed Jewel Music Pod to by Sega Toys. During the series production, Hiroaki Sakurai, the director of Cromartie High School and the recently released Jewelpet the Movie: Sweets Dance Princess became involved with the series's development. Shuhei Abe, of the show's sound directors revealed in a series of tweets about some of the cast of the series, which includes the main human characters (Megumi Han, Ikumi Hayama and Mai Aizawa) as well as the pets and the other human characters which were later revealed on the official website.

On the press conference held in Sanrio Puroland on 2 April 2013, voice actors Ayaka Saito and Ai Kayano detailed a few things regarding the upcoming series as well as describing Chiari's personality for the anime as being a "goofy yet energetic girl who thinks positively in all circumstances." Saito also stated that this is her 6th time she's voicing Ruby since the first series. Also in the event, the Japanese idol group Fairies also performed the opening theme for the anime, which is announced to be released in early Summer of 2013. Ito Momoka, one of the members commented that "I'm honored to be able to perform at Sanrio Puroland where I've been visited many times.” Regarding the theme song, she said, “Our song is bracing just like the anime, and the choreography to the song is cute which people can emulate!” The series premiered at 6 April 2013 and ended its broadcast on 29 March 2014.

== Media ==
=== Anime ===
The first anime series officially aired in both TV Osaka and TV Tokyo from 5 April 2009 to 26 March 2010, replacing Onegai My Melody Kirara★ in its initial timeslot. The series is also currently streaming in the Japanese Streaming service U-NEXT. As part of the franchise's 10th anniversary, the series alongside its sequels were streamed in Sanrio's official YouTube channel beginning on 13 June 2019.

==== Legacy ====
The success of the first series gained itself several more seasons, each revolving on different protagonist characters and different depictions of Jewel Land. The second series titled Jewelpet Twinkle☆ (ジュエルペット てぃんくる☆, Juerupetto Tinkuru☆) premiered later on TV Tokyo from 3 April 2010 to 2 April 2011 with 52 Episodes. The second series is directed by Takashi Yamamoto (Pokémon), produced by Hideyuki Kachi (Tokyo Mew Mew) and written by Michiru Shimada (Nanatsuiro Drops). Character designs were done by Yukiko Ibe. An epilogue OVA episode under the title A Rainbow of Smiles Doki☆Doki! (ほほえみの虹にドッキ☆ドキ！, Hohoemi no niji ni dokki ☆ doki!) is released on 22 July 2013 alongside the series' Blu-ray box set.

The third series titled Jewelpet Sunshine (ジュエルペット サンシャイン, Juerupetto Sanshain) is also produced and premiered on 9 April 2011 and ended on 31 March 2012, directed by Takayuki Inagaki (Muv-Luv Alternative: Total Eclipse) and written by Yuko Kakihara (Persona 4: The Animation). Character designs were done by Mariko Fujita (Galaxy Angel).

The fourth series titled Jewelpet Kira☆Deco! (ジュエルペット きら☆デコッ！, Juerupetto Kira☆Deko!) began airing on 7 April 2012 and ended its broadcast on 30 March 2013. The 4th series is directed by Makoto Moriwaki (Onegai My Melody) and written by Kazuyuki Fudeyasu (Tantei Opera Milky Holmes). Tomoko Miyakawa returns as the character designer for the fourth series.

A fifth series titled Jewelpet Happiness (ジュエルペット ハッピネス, Juerupetto Happinesu) was first revealed on the March Issue of Pucchigumi and premiered on 6 April 2013 and ended on 29 March 2014. The series is directed by Hiroaki Sakurai (Daa! Daa! Daa!, Cromartie High School).

The sixth series titled Lady Jewelpet (レディジュエルペット, Redijuerupetto) is announced by Sanrio via the official Anime Twitter account and premiered on 5 April 2014 and ended on 28 March 2015, to coincide with the Anime's 5th anniversary.

The seventh and final series titled Jewelpet: Magical Change (ジュエルペット マジカルチェンジ, Juerupetto Majikaru Chenji) is announced by Sanrio at the 2015 Winter Wonder Festival in Japan and was confirmed in the March Issue of Pucchigumi, airing from 4 April 2015 to 26 December 2015.

An episodic original net animation titled Jewelpet Attack Chance!? (ジュエルペット あたっくちゃんす！？, Juerupetto Atakku Chansu!?) was produced by AIC Project, directed by Fumikazu Satō and supervised by Hiroshi Negishi (NG Knight Ramune & 40). It began streaming on Sega Toys's official YouTube page and in both the Jewel Pod and Jewel Pad on 18 February 2016.

An anime special titled Jewelpet! Welcome Visitors from the Magical Kingdom! (ジュエルペット！魔法の国から来たお客様！, Juerupetto! Mahō no Kuni Kara Kita Okyakusama!) aired on Japan on 24 December 2016 as the 47th episode of Rilu Rilu Fairilu ~ Yousei no Door ~.

Another anime special collaborating with Rilu Rilu Fairilu titled Rilu Rilu Fairilu Jewel Flash in Jewel Land! (ジュエルランドでリルリルフェアリルジュエルフラッシュ！, Juerurando de Riru Riru Feariru Jueru Furasshu!) aired on 11 August 2017 as the 19th episode of its anime's second season, ~ Mahou no Kagami ~.

=== Films ===
A full-length feature film titled Jewelpet the Movie: Sweets Dance Princess (映画ジュエルペット スウィーツダンスプリンセス, Eiga Juerupetto: Suuītsu Dansu Purinsesu), was directed by Hiroaki Sakurai and distributed by Toho. It was released in Japanese theaters on 11 August 2012.

An original video animation named Jewelpet Attack Travel! (ジュエルペット あたっくとらべる！, Juerupetto Atakku Toraberu!), produced by Ashi Productions and directed by Hiroshi Negishi, premiered in a livestream on Niconico Live on 14 May 2022. Though originally set for a theatrical release on 7 February 2020, it was delayed indefinitely due to production issues caused in light of the COVID-19 pandemic; and would have been double billed alongside Kukuriraige: Sanxingdui Fantasy. On 29 March 2022, Sanrio announced that the short film will be released on Blu-ray, as a part of the BD-BOX of Jewelpet Sunshine, on 27 July 2022. The film serves as a crossover between Jewelpet and NG Knight Ramune & 40.

=== Music ===
The music of series 1 to 3 is composed by Shirō Hamaguchi (Oh My Goddess!, Rosario + Vampire). Series 4's music is composed by Cher Watanabe (Maken-ki!) and Series 5's music is composed by Wataru Maeguchi (Hayate the Combat Butler: Can't Take My Eyes Off You). The music is directed by Takuya Hiramitsu in series 1 and Yoshikazu Iwanami in series 2 to 5.

For the first series, Two songs were made for both the Opening and Ending themes of the series. The Opening theme is titled Really? Seriously! Magical☆Jewel (マジ?マジ! マジカル☆ジュエル, Maji? Maji! Majikaru ☆ jueru) by Yui Asaka and the ending theme is titled The Smile's Loop (笑顔のループ, Egao no rūpu) by Horie Mitsuko. The lyrics were composed by Yuriko Mori and composed by Kosuke Makino and Cher Watanabe. The second series also has two songs made for both the Opening and Ending themes. The Opening theme is titled Happy☆Twinkle (Happy☆てぃんくる, Hapii☆Tinkuru) by former AKB48 member Kayano Masuyama featuring Ayaka Saito and Miyuki Sawashiro as both Ruby and Labra. The ending theme is titled Scribbling at the Sky (空ニラクガキ, Sora ni Rakugaki) by Natsumi Takamori, Ayana Taketatsu and Azusa Kataoka as Akari, Miria and Sara. The opening is composed by Takafumi Iwasaki of Project.R fame and the ending is composed by Takahiro Matsumoto.

Sunshine also has two songs, one Opening and one Ending. The Opening theme is titled GO! GO! Sunshine (GO! GO! サンシャイン, GO! GO! Sanshain) by Mayumi Gojo and the ending theme is titled Nowadays girl (イマドキ乙女, Imadoki otome) by Kayano Masuyama and Misuzu Mochizuki. The opening is composed with lyrics by Takafumi Iwasaki and the ending is composed by Yuriko Mori with lyrics from Noriyuki Asakura. Kira Deco has two theme songs as well. The Opening theme is titled Happy Lucky☆Go! (ハッピーラッキー☆ゴー！, Happī rakkī ☆ gō!) and the ending theme is titled Friends Forever and Ever (ずっとずっとトモダチ, Zutto Zutto Tomodachi), both performed by Mana Ashida with lyrics and composition from Natsumi Watanabe and Shingo Asari

Happiness is confirmed to have two official songs. For Episodes 1-39, the opening and ending theme is titled At the End of the Light (光の果てに, Hikari no hate ni) while for Episodes 40 to 52, the opening and ending theme is titled RUN with U, both performed by the Japanese idol group Fairies.

A Compilation CD Soundtrack is later announced by Frontier Works, and is released on 22 July 2016. The soundtrack contains all the official opening and ending theme songs of all 7 Jewelpet series.

=== Novel ===
A spin-off light novel titled Jewelpet: The Fuss in the Jewel Festival!? (ジュエルペット: ジュエルフェスティバルはおおさわぎ!?, Juerupetto: Juerufesutibaru wa ōsawagi!?) was released as part of Kadokawa's Tsubasa Bunko Children's Light Novels on 11 May 2012, written by Hiroko Kanasugi and illustrated by POP. It introduces an exclusive character to the story, a "Jewelpet" named Lolip (ロリップ, Rorippu) and the story revolves around her experiences and bond with Ruby and her friends while setting up the Jewel Festival in Jewel Land.

=== Video releases ===
Marvelous Inc. released several volumes of the first series on separate Region 2 DVDs in Japan. All seventeen volumes have been released, the first 16 has 3 episodes while the last volume has 4 episodes.

Nippon Columbia issues several DVD volumes of Jewelpet Twinkle during the series's airing. Frontier Works also released the series as a DVD Box set on 22 July 2011. "Fan Discs" were also released due to the show's popularity in Comiket, each containing some episodes and bonus extras. The first is released on 9 September 2011, Fan Disc F, which includes a special version of the Opening Video of the anime, is released on 16 January 2012 and a Blu-ray fan disc is released on 9 September 2012, with a Limited Edition be released on 10 August 2012. A Blu-ray box set is also announced and released on 21 July 2013, which includes an Original Video Animation episode and a second official soundtrack. The Boxset will also include an official Illustration booklet, containing official illustrations and promotional images from the Anime series.

Jewelpet Sunshine also has some standard DVD releases by Nippon Columbia before gaining DVD box set releases from Victor Entertainment. The first DVD Box set was released on 9 December 2011, the second DVD Box on 9 March 2012, the third on 8 June 2012 and the fourth on 7 September 2012. All 4 DVD Box sets contains 4 Discs, spanning into each half of the series. The DVD releases also omit the licensed songs used in the series due to licensing issues with other companies.

Jewelpet Kira Deco gained its official DVD release by Universal Music Japan starting 22 August 2012. Six volumes were already released for rental in Japan. Victor Entertainment also announced a Blu-ray Selection Box set release on 20 September 2013, which contain 16 selected episodes of the series.

Jewelpet Happiness gained four official DVD box set releases by TC Entertainment, a Group company of Tokyo Broadcasting System Holdings, Mainichi Broadcasting System and Chubu-Nippon Broadcasting, with each of the box sets containing four discs, spanning into each half of the series. The first box set is released on 25 October 2013, the second is released on 31 January 2014, the third box set is released on 25 April 2014 and the fourth is released on 27 June 2014.

== See also ==
- Pretty Cure - an Anime Franchise by Toei Company, which once served as Jewelpet's rival in ratings.
- Ojarumaru
- Onegai My Melody
