= The White Angel =

The White Angel or White Angel may refer to:

== Film ==
- The White Angel (1936 film), an American historical drama directed by William Dieterle
- White Angel (1993 film), a British thriller directed by Chris Jones
- The White Angel (2007 film), a Turkish drama, written and directed by Mahsun Kırmızıgül
- The White Angel (1943 film), a 1943 Italian drama film
- The White Angel (1955 film), a 1955 Italian film

== Other uses ==
- White Angel, a detail of the fresco in the Mileševa monastery, Serbia
- Alfred Hayes (wrestler) (1928–2005), English professional wrestler, manager and commentator known as The White Angel
- "White Angel" (song), a 2012 song by Japanese girl idol group Fairies
- Wrightia antidysenterica, commonly known as white angel

== See also ==
- Josef Mengele (1911–1979), German SS officer and physician at Auschwitzm referred to as "der weiße Engel" ("the White Angel")
- L'Ange Blanc (1930s–2006), masked wrestler in France during the 1950s and 60s
- Ángel Blanco (1938–1986), Mexican professional wrestler
- NK Zagreb, a Croatian football club whose fans are known as "Bijeli anđeli" ("White Angels")
- White Angel, a car on the cover of the racing game Ridge Racer Revolution
