= M Three =

Japanese singing trio

- Years active: 2013–present
- Labels: Sonic Groove (Avex Group)
- Spinoff of: Fairies
- Members: Miki Shimomura; Miria Fujita; Mahiro Hayashida

M Three (Mスリー) is a Japanese all-female singing trio. It is a subunit (subgroup) of the girl group Fairies.

The members are Miki, Miria and Mahiro. The names of all three start with the Latin letter M.

== Members ==
- Miki Shimomura (下村実生, born October 22, 1998)
- Miria Fujita (藤田みりあ, born June 15, 1998)
- Mahiro Hayashida (林田真尋, born May 7, 1998)

== Discography ==
=== Singles ===
No.	Title	Release date	Charts	Album
No.	Title	Release date	JPN Oricon	Album
1	"Yumemiru Dancing Doll" (夢見るダンシングドール, "Dreaming Dancing Doll")	March 27, 2013	8	—
2	"Your Love"	July 30, 2014	16	—

== Music videos ==
Year	Title	Director
2013	"Yumemiru Dancing Doll"	Ryōtarō Muramatsu
2014	"Your Love"	Tatsuya Murakami
