= Fairies (album) =

Studio album by Fairies
- Released: March 26, 2014 (JP)
- Recorded: 2012 – 2013
- Genre: J-pop
- Label: Sonic Groove

Singles from Fairies
- 1. "More Kiss / Song for You" Released: January 19, 2011; 2. "Hero / Sweet Jewel" Released: December 21, 2011; 3. "Beat Generation / No More Distance" Released: April 4, 2012; 4. "Tweet Dream / Sparkle" Released: July 25, 2012; 5. "White Angel" Released: December 14, 2012; 6. "Hikari no Hate ni" Released: July 24, 2013; 7. "Run with U" Released: February 19, 2014

Fairies is the first studio album by the Japanese girl group Fairies. It was released in Japan on the label Sonic Groove on March 26, 2014.

== Track listing ==
CD

1. "Hikari no Hate ni"
2. "White Angel"
3. "More Kiss"
4. "Song for You"
5. "Beat Generation"
6. "No More Distance"
7. "Hero" (HERO)
8. "Sparkle"
9. "Tweet Dream"
10. "Sweet Jewel"
11. "Run with U"
12. "Poker Face feat. MOMOKA"

DVD/Blu-ray

The disks come with the limited CD+DVD and CD+Blu-ray editions

1. More Kiss (video clip)
2. Song for You (video clip)
3. HERO (video clip)
4. Sweet Jewel (video clip)
5. Beat Generation (video clip)
6. No More Distance (video clip)
7. Tweet Dream (video clip)
8. Sparkle (video clip)
9. White Angel (video clip)
10. Hikari no Hate ni (video clip)
11. Run With U (video clip)

== Charts ==
| Chart (2014) | Peak position |
|---|---|
| Oricon Daily Albums Chart | 10 |
| Oricon Weekly Albums Chart | 14 |
| Billboard Japan Top Albums | 17 |
