= Miki Shimomura =

- 下村 実生
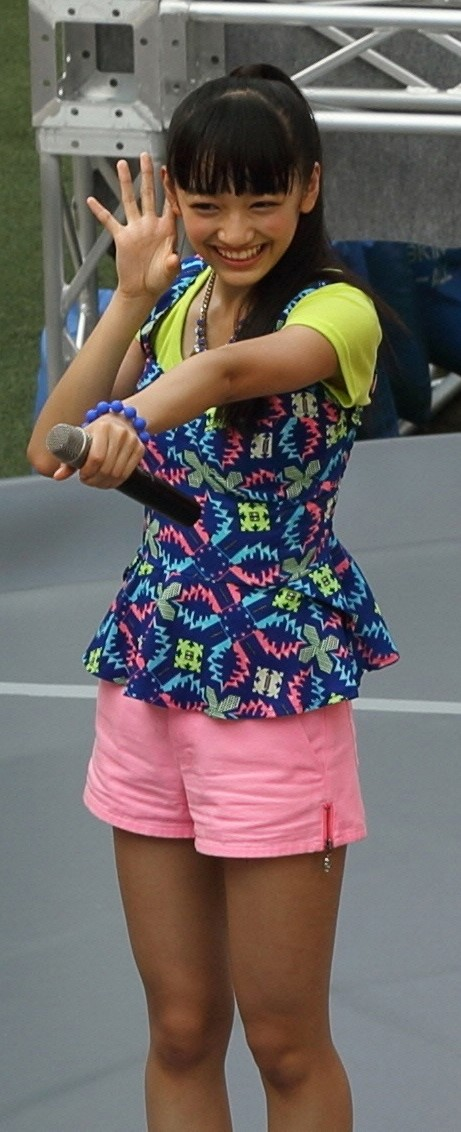
- Born: 22 October 1998 (age 27); Tokyo, Japan
- Occupations: Singer; dancer; model
- Agent: Rising Production
- Musical career
- Years active: 2011–present
- Member of: M Three
- Formerly of: Fairies

Miki Shimomura (下村 実生, Shimomura Miki; born 22 October 1998 in Tokyo) is a Japanese fashion model and former idol singer.

== Career ==
She debuted as a member of the girl group Fairies in 2011. She also joined its subunit M Three with Hayashida Mahiro and Fujita Miria in 2013.

== Bibliography ==
=== Magazines ===
- Seventeen, as an exclusive model since 2013

=== Theater ===
- Little Women, as Amy March since 2019
