= Tweet Dream / Sparkle =

Single by Fairies

from the album Fairies
- A-side: "Tweet Dream"; "Sparkle"
- Released: July 25, 2012 (Japan)
- Genre: J-pop
- Label: Sonic Groove

Fairies singles chronology
"Beat Generation / No More Distance" (2012)	"Tweet Dream / Sparkle" (2012)	"White Angel" (2012)

Music video
- "Tweet Dream" "Sparkle" on YouTube

"Tweet Dream / Sparkle" is the 4th single by the Japanese girl idol group Fairies, released in Japan on July 25, 2012, on the label Sonic Groove (a subsidiary of Avex Group).

It is a double-A-side single.

The physical CD single debuted at number 9 in the Oricon weekly singles chart.

== Release ==
The single was released in several versions: CD+DVD, CD-only, CD+notebook&shitajiki, and there were also limited-edition picture-labeled CDs that were available only in the Mu-mo online shop.

== Track listing ==
=== CD+DVD edition ===
CD
No.	Title	Length
1.	"Tweet Dream"
2.	"Sparkle"
3.	"Tweet Dream (Instrumental)"
4.	"Sparkle (Instrumental)"

DVD
No.	Title	Length
1.	"Tweet Dream MUSIC VIDEO"
2.	"Sparkle MUSIC VIDEO"
3.	"Sparkle (Dance Edition)"

=== CD-only edition ===
CD
No.	Title	Length
1.	"Tweet Dream"
2.	"Sparkle"
3.	"Tweet Dream (Instrumental)"
4.	"Sparkle (Instrumental)"

=== Limited editions ===
CD
No.	Title	Length
1.	"Tweet Dream"
2.	"Sparkle"

== Charts ==
=== Single ===
Chart (2012)	Peak position
Japan (Oricon Daily Singles Chart)	6
Japan (Oricon Weekly Singles Chart)	9
Japan (Billboard Japan Hot Singles Sales)	16

=== "Tweet Dream" ===
Chart (2012)	Peak position
Japan (Billboard Japan Hot 100)	7
Japan (Billboard Japan Hot Top Airplay)	5
Japan (Billboard Japan Adult Contemporary Airplay)	13
