= Hero / Sweet Jewel =

Single by Fairies

from the album Fairies
- A-side: "Hero"; "Sweet Jewel"
- Released: December 21, 2011 (Japan)
- Genre: J-pop
- Label: Sonic Groove

Fairies singles chronology
| "More Kiss / Song for You" (2011) | "Hero / Sweet Jewel" (2011) | "Beat Generation / No More Distance" (2012) |

Music video
- "Hero" "Sweet Jewel" on YouTube

Professional ratings
Review scores
| Source | Rating |
|---|---|
| Hotexpress | Favorable |

"HERO / Sweet Jewel" is the 2nd single by the Japanese girl idol group Fairies, released in Japan on December 21, 2011 on the label Sonic Groove (a subsidiary of Avex Group).

It is a double-A-side single.

The physical CD single debuted at number 9 in the Oricon weekly singles chart.

== Release ==
The single was released in two versions: CD-only and CD+DVD.

== Track listing ==
=== CD+DVD edition ===
CD
| No. | Title | Length |
|---|---|---|
| 1. | "HERO" | 3:01 |
| 2. | "Sweet Jewel" | 4:42 |
| 3. | "HERO (Instrumental)" |
| 4. | "Sweet Jewel (Instrumental)" |

DVD (CD+DVD edition only)
| No. | Title | Length |
|---|---|---|
| 1. | "HERO MUSIC VIDEO" |
| 2. | "Sweet Jewel MUSIC VIDEO" |
| 3. | "Sweet Jewel (Dance Edition)" |

== Charts ==
| Chart (2011) | Peak position |
|---|---|
| Japan (Oricon Weekly Singles Chart) | 9 |
