= Beat Generation / No More Distance =

Single by Fairies

from the album Fairies
- A-side: "Beat Generation"; "No More Distance"
- Released: April 4, 2012 (Japan)
- Genre: J-pop
- Label: Sonic Groove

Fairies singles chronology
| "Hero / Sweet Jewel" (2011) | "Beat Generation / No More Distance" (2012) | "Tweet Dream / Sparkle" (2012) |

Music video
- "Beat Generation" "No More Distance" on YouTube

Professional ratings
Review scores
| Source | Rating |
|---|---|
| Billboard Japan / Hotexpress | Favorable |

"Beat Generation / No More Distance" is the 3rd single by the Japanese girl idol group Fairies, released in Japan on April 4, 2012, on the label Sonic Groove (a subsidiary of Avex Group).dfd

It is a double-A-side single.

The physical CD single debuted at number 5 in the Oricon weekly singles chart.

== Release ==
The single was released in three versions: CD-only, CD+DVD and CD+paperfile.

== Track listing ==
=== CD+DVD edition ===
CD
| No. | Title | Length |
|---|---|---|
| 1. | "Beat Generation" | 3:48 |
| 2. | "No More Distance" | 3:57 |
| 3. | "Beat Generation (Instrumental)" |
| 4. | "No More Distance (Instrumental)" |

DVD
| No. | Title | Length |
|---|---|---|
| 1. | "Beat Generation MUSIC VIDEO" |
| 2. | "No More Distance MUSIC VIDEO" |
| 3. | "Bonus: Beat Generation (Dance Edition)" |

=== CD-only edition ===
CD
| No. | Title | Length |
|---|---|---|
| 1. | "Beat Generation" | 3:48 |
| 2. | "No More Distance" | 3:57 |
| 3. | "Beat Generation (Instrumental)" |
| 4. | "No More Distance (Instrumental)" |

=== CD+paperfile edition ===
CD
| No. | Title | Length |
|---|---|---|
| 1. | "Beat Generation" |
| 2. | "No More Distance" |

== Charts ==
=== Single ===
| Chart (2012) | Peak position |
|---|---|
| Japan (Oricon Daily Singles Chart) | 3 |
| Japan (Oricon Weekly Singles Chart) | 5 |
| Japan (Billboard Japan Hot Singles Sales) | 4 |

=== "Beat Generation" ===
| Chart (2012) | Peak position |
|---|---|
| Japan (Billboard Japan Hot 100) | 3 |
| Japan (Billboard Japan Hot Top Airplay) | 2 |
| Japan (Billboard Japan Adult Contemporary Airplay) | 9 |

== Awards ==
| Year | Nominee / work | Award | Result |
|---|---|---|---|
| 2012 | "Beat Generation" | Japan Cable Awards — Excellence Award | Won |
