= More Kiss / Song for You =

Single by Fairies

from the album Fairies
- A-side: "More Kiss"; "Sweet Jewel"
- Released: September 21, 2011 (Japan)
- Genre: J-pop
- Label: Sonic Groove

Fairies singles chronology
"More Kiss / Song for You" (2011)	"Hero / Sweet Jewel" (2011)

Music video
- "More Kiss" "Sweet Jewel" on YouTube

Professional ratings
Review scores
Source	Rating
Hotexpress	Favorable

"More Kiss / Song for You" is the debut single by the Japanese girl idol group Fairies, released in Japan on September 21, 2011 on the label Sonic Groove (a subsidiary of Avex Group).

It is a double-A-side single.

The physical CD single debuted at number 9 in the Oricon weekly singles chart.

== Release ==
The single was released in two versions: CD-only and CD+DVD.

== Track listing ==
=== CD+DVD edition ===
CD
No.	Title	Length
1.	"More Kiss"	4:23
2.	"Songs for You"	4:06
3.	"More Kiss (Instrumental)"
4.	"Songs for You (Instrumental)"

== Charts ==
=== Single ===
Chart (2011)	Peak position
Japan (Oricon Weekly Singles Chart)	11

=== "More Kiss" ===
Chart (2011)	Peak position
Japan (Billboard Japan Hot Top Airplay)	1

== Awards ==
Year	Nominee / work	Award	Result
2011	"More Kiss"	Japan Cable Awards — New Artist	Won
