= Hikari no Hate ni =

- CD+DVD Version Cover

Single by Fairies

from the album Fairies
- B-side: "Yell"
- Released: July 24, 2013
- Recorded: 2013
- Genre: J-pop
- Label: Sonic Groove
- Songwriter: Tetsuro Oda

Fairies singles chronology
"White Angel" (2012)	"Hikari no Hate ni" (2013)	"Run with U" (2014)

Music video
- "Hikari no Hate ni" (Dance Version) on YouTube

"Hikari no Hate ni" (光の果てに, lit. "At the End of the Light") is the 6th single by Japanese pop idol group Fairies, released on July 24, 2013. It is Fairies' first contribution to an anime series and is the opening and ending song for the Studio Comet and Sanrio/Sega Sammy Holdings anime television series Jewelpet Happiness.

== Summary ==
"Hikari no Hate ni" is Fairies' first contribution to an anime series, first announced and performed during the anime's press conference in Sanrio Puroland. One of the members, Momoka Itō, stated: "I'm honored to be able to perform at Sanrio Puroland where I've visited many times." Regarding the theme song, she said, "Our song is bracing just like the anime, and the choreography to the song is cute which people can emulate!"

A short Dance PV of the song was later officially released on YouTube on April 5, 2013. On May 5, the single's release date was confirmed. On June 6, 2013, a short preview of the full PV is shown on the official YouTube account along with two behind the scenes videos.

== Track listing ==
=== CD+DVD and CD Only Editions ===
All music is composed by Tetsuro Oda

CD
No.	Title	Length
1.	"Hikari no Hate ni" (光の果てに)	3:36
2.	"Yell" (エール)	3:05
3.	"Hikari no Hate ni (Instrumental)" (光の果てに (Instrumental))	3:36
4.	"Yell (Instrumental)" (エール (Instrumental))	3:03

CD+DVD Edition DVD
No.	Title	Length
1.	"Hikari no Hate ni (Music Video)" (光の果てに (MUSIC VIDEO))
2.	"Bonus video" (特典映像)

=== Picture Label Edition (Mumo Shop / Vision Factory Official Shop Limited Edition) ===
The picture label CD included in the edition comes in seven different versions (each featuring a picture of a member). The version is chosen randomly so the buyer does not know which member they are getting.

CD
No.	Title	Length
1.	"Hikari no Hate ni" (光の果てに)
2.	"Yell" (エール)

== Charts ==
Chart (2013)	Peak position
Oricon Weekly Singles Chart	6
