= White Angel (song) =

"Tweet Dream / Sparkle"

Single by Fairies

from the album Fairies
- A-side: "Tweet Dream"
- B-side: "One Love"
- Released: November 14, 2012 (Japan)
- Genre: J-pop
- Label: Sonic Groove

Fairies singles chronology
"Tweet Dream / Sparkle" (2012)	"Tweet Dream / Sparkle" (2012)	"Hikari no Hate ni" (2013)

Music video
- "White Angel" on YouTube

"White Angel" is the 5th single by the Japanese girl idol group Fairies, released in Japan on November 14, 2012 on the label Sonic Groove (a subsidiary of Avex Group).

The physical CD single debuted at number 5 in the Oricon weekly singles chart.

== Release ==
The single was released in several versions: CD+DVD, CD-only, a limited live venue CD+photoalbum edition that was intended for sale only at concerts, and there were also limited-edition picture-labeled CDs that were available only in the Mu-mo online shop.

== Track listing ==
=== CD+DVD edition ===
CD
No.	Title	Length
1.	"White Angel"	3:39
2.	"One Love"	2:51
3.	"White Angel (Instrumental)"
4.	"One Love (Instrumental)"

DVD
No.	Title	Length
1.	"White Angel"
2.	"White Angel (Dance Edition)"
3.	"Bonus"

=== CD-only edition ===
CD
No.	Title	Length
1.	"White Angel"
2.	"One Love"
3.	"White Angel (Instrumental)"
4.	"One Love (Instrumental)"

=== Limited editions ===
CD
No.	Title	Length
1.	"White Angel"
2.	"One Love"

== Charts ==
=== Single ===
Chart (2012)	Peak position
Japan (Oricon Daily Singles Chart)	5
Japan (Oricon Weekly Singles Chart)	5
Japan (Billboard Japan Hot 100)	18
Japan (Billboard Japan Hot Singles Sales)	11
Japan (Billboard Japan Hot Top Airplay)	13
Japan (Billboard Japan Adult Contemporary Airplay)	13

== Awards ==
Year	Nominee / work	Award	Result
2012	"White Angel"	Japan Record Awards — Gold Award	Won
2012	"White Angel"	Japan Record Awards — Grand Prix	Nominated
