= Run with U (Fairies song) =

"Run With U"
- CD+DVD Version Cover

Single by Fairies

from the album Fairies
- B-side: "Silly Boy"; "Wild Baby"
- Released: February 19, 2014
- Recorded: 2013
- Genre: J-pop; dance-pop
- Label: Sonic Groove
- Songwriter: LASSE HANSEN

Fairies singles chronology
"Hikari no Hate ni" (2013)	"Run With U" (2014)	"Super Hero / Love Me, Love You More" (2014)

Music video
- "Run With U" on YouTube

"Run With U" is the seventh single by Japanese pop idol group Fairies, released on February 19, 2014. The song is used as the second opening for the Studio Comet and Sanrio/Sega Sammy Holdings anime television series Jewelpet Happiness, the ending for Lady Jewelpet, and commercials for Waseda Academy.

== Summary ==
"Run With U" was first used in a Waseda Academy commercial in June 2013, featuring Momoka Itō taking on some American football players. The song was confirmed on December 14, 2013, with its upcoming release as the 7th official single being used as the second opening theme of Jewelpet Happiness. Minami Sasuga was in charge for the choreography of the song's upcoming PV.

== Track listing ==
=== CD+DVD and CD Only Editions ===
CD
No.	Title	Length
1.	"Run With U"
2.	"Silly Boy"
3.	"Wild Baby (CD Version Only)"
4.	"Run With U (Instrumental)"
5.	"Silly Boy (Instrumental)"
6.	"Wild Baby (Instrumental)"

CD+DVD Edition DVD
No.	Title	Length
1.	"Run With U (Music Video)"

== Charts ==
Chart (2014)	Peak position
Oricon Weekly Singles Chart	8
