= Sanrio Puroland =

Japanese theme park

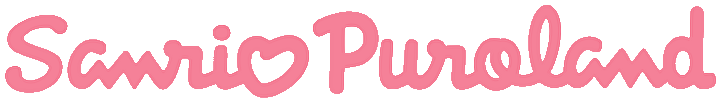

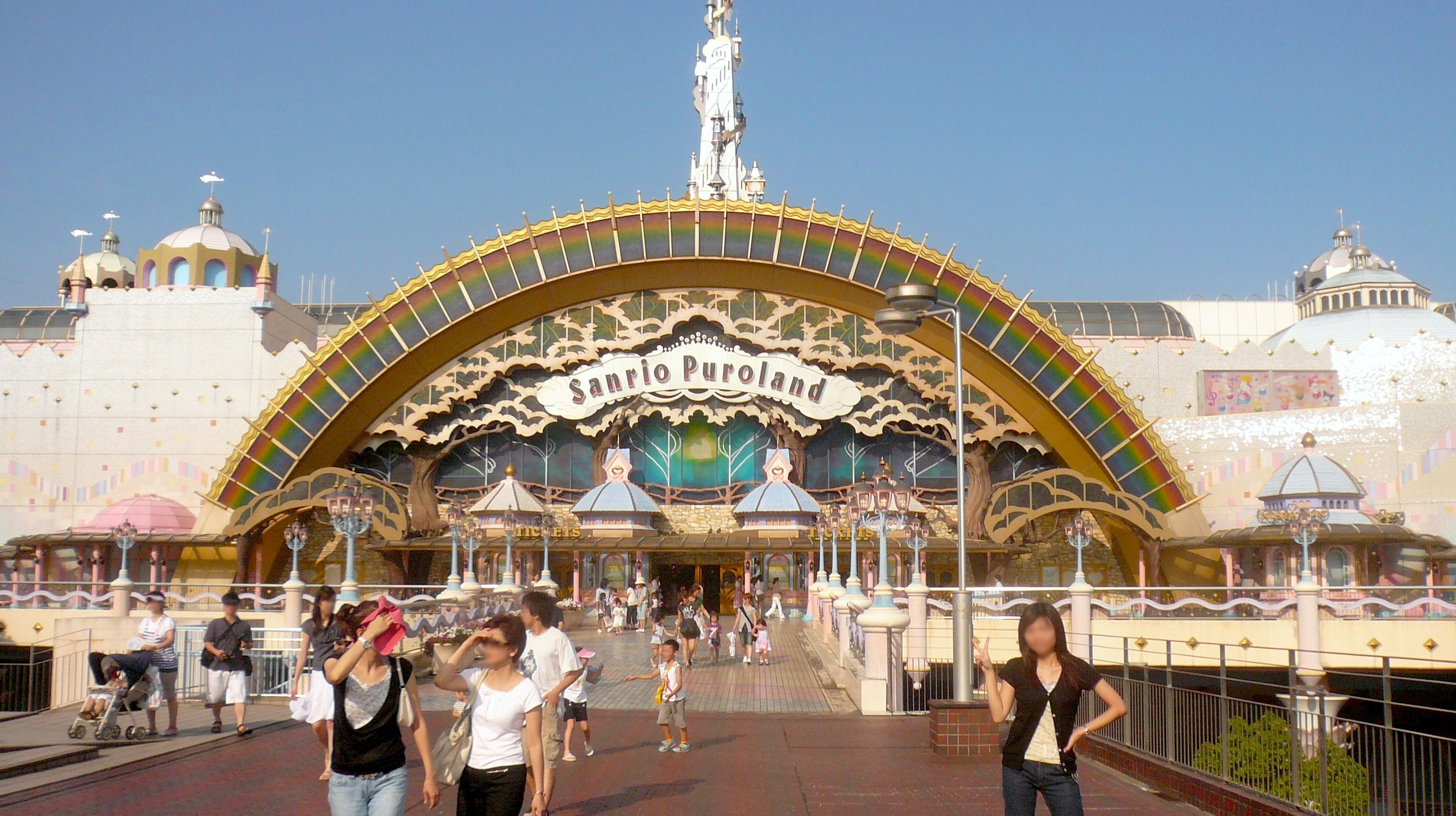
- The park entrance to Sanrio Puroland.
- Interactive map of Sanrio Puroland
- Location: Tama, Tokyo, Japan
- Coordinates: 35°37′28″N 139°25′45″E
- Status: Operating
- Opened: December 7, 1990
- Owner: Sanrio
- Operated by: Sanrio Entertainment Co., Ltd.
- Theme: Sanrio characters
- Attendance: 1,500,000
- Area: 45,900 square metres (494,000 ft^{2})

Attractions
- Total: 2
- Website: www.puroland.jp

Sanrio Puroland (サンリオピューロランド, Sanrio Pyūrorando), also known as Hello Kitty Land, is an indoor theme park located in Tama New Town, Tokyo, Japan. Opened on December 7, 1990, it hosts attractions, live shows, shopping outlets, and restaurants dedicated to Sanrio characters such as Hello Kitty, My Melody, Cinnamoroll, Gudetama, and Aggretsuko, in a manner akin to Disney theme parks.

Sanrio Puroland attracts over 1.5 million visitors per year, and is ranked among the major theme parks in Japan, along with both Tokyo Disney Resort parks and Fuji-Q Highland. Sanrio also operates Harmonyland, an outdoor theme park in Oita Prefecture.

== History ==
Sanrio Puroland was a "bold attempt" to challenge Disney and its theme parks. During its conceptual phase, Sanrio Puroland (Note: The word "Puroland" is a combination of the words piero (clown) and pure.) was known by many names - first as Sanrio Communication World, as well as Sanrio Heart Park and Sanrio Piero Land. (Note: At that time, "Piero" was already registered as a food and clothing trademark.) The original theme was going to be "communication", as opposed to Sanrio's existing works, including its characters.

In 1985, Sanrio initiated a project called "Sanrio Science Culture Communication Center" (SSCCC) with the goal of constructing a theme park that would open in 1990 to coincide with Sanrio's 30th anniversary. To build knowledge on theme park operation, management, and interior design, Sanrio commissioned Landmark Entertainment Group to design two facilities - the Ginza Sanrio Gift Gate (a concept shop that was located at the same spot as the current Ginza flagship store of Tiffany and Co.) and Sanrio Phantasien (an indoor mini-park that was located inside what is now the LaLaport TOKYO-BAY retail complex). The initial design phase began in 1987, and Sanrio Puroland broke ground on November 16, 1988. It took a team of 2,500 workers (Note: Of the 2,500 involved in Puroland's construction, 300 of them are hired from Landmark Entertainment, and also included workers from Disney and Universal Studios.) approximately two years to complete, at a cost of around JPY 60-70 million.

=== Early days ===
Sanrio Puroland opened on December 7, 1990, and would operate at a loss for the first few years of operation, due to factors such as the aftereffects of the Japanese asset price bubble burst and complaints from city locals.

=== Notable temporary closures ===
Sanrio Puroland was temporarily closed from February 22 to July 20, 2020, during the early stages of the COVID-19 pandemic.

== Points of interest ==
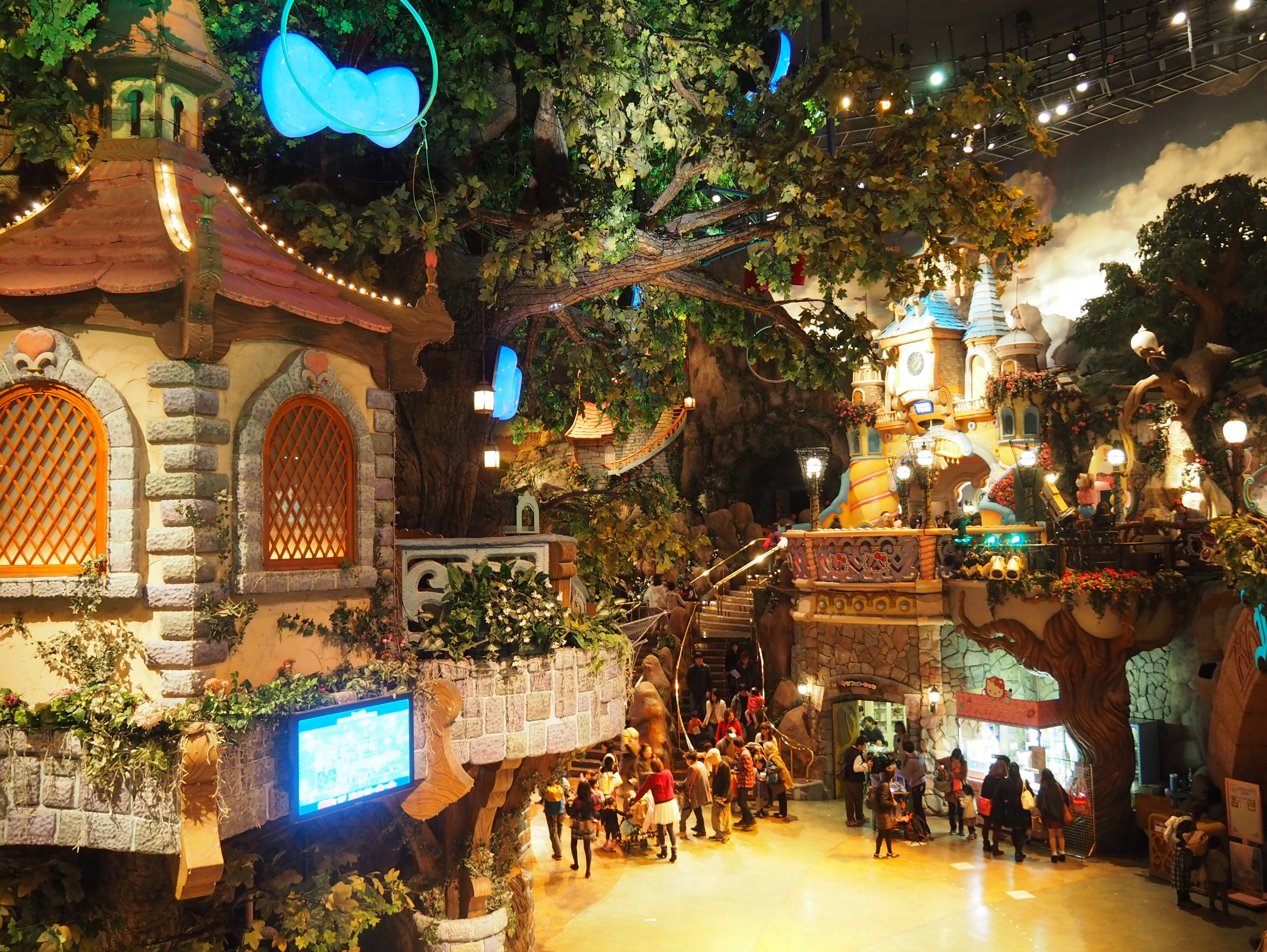
Interior of the theme park

=== Attractions ===
==== Rides ====
Sanrio Puroland features two dark rides. The Sanrio Characters Boat Ride, (Note: Was known as "Fantastic Puro Adventure" until November 1999.) which tells the story of various Sanrio characters preparing for a party held by Hello Kitty, was the park's only ride until the opening of Sanrio Town in 2013, and with it, the opening of Mymeroad Drive, where riders are taken on a tour of Mariland (My Melody's homeland) via a rental car designed by Kuromi, My Melody's rival. Both rides offer commemorative photographs which can be separately purchased.

==== Walkthrough attractions ====
Sanrio Puroland has two walkthrough attractions, both found at Sanrio Town (second floor), as follows:

- Lady Kitty House - Visitors explore a regal-like residence with several items decorated in Hello Kitty's image (some parts of this attraction are designed by Japanese graphic designer and art director Yuni Yoshida). At the end of the attraction, visitors can have a photo together with Hello Kitty (can be printed for a separate fee).
- Kiki & Lala Twinkling Tour - Visitors explore a replica of the birthplace of Kiki and Lala (Little Twin Stars).

==== Other attractions ====
Visitors can ring Hello Kitty's Bell of Happiness, located inside the Tree of Wisdom. There are also five food factory displays (candy, juice, chocolate, bread, and ice cream), and a game corner with kids' rides, purikura booths, and UFO catchers.

==== Former attractions ====
Monster Planet of Godzilla was a former simulator attraction featuring Godzilla that ran from March 18, 1994 to July 1, 1998.

=== Live entertainment ===
==== Main parades ====
The main parades of Sanrio Puroland take place around the Tree of Wisdom in Puro Village (first floor). The current main parade is the "Miracle Gift Parade", which debuted in late 2015 to commemorate Sanrio Puroland's 25th anniversary. Past parades and seasonal parades are as follows:

Past parades

- Sanrio Starlight Parade (1990 to 1997)
- Sanrio All-Star Parade "Cosmic Fantasy" (July 19, 1997 to June 19, 2001)
- Illuminant (June 22, 2001 to June 12, 2007)
- Sanrio Heartful Parade "Believe with Hello Kitty" (June 15, 2007 to October 31, 2013)
- Hello Kitty 40th Anniversary Parade "ARIGATO EVERYONE!" (November 1, 2013 to January 13, 2015)
- My Melody and Little Twin Stars 40th Anniversary Parade "OMOIYARI TO YOU" (January 16, 2015 to November 29, 2015)

Seasonal parades

- Musical Show "The Puro Christmas" (2018)
- Puro Summer Fest LIVE!!!! (2019)

==== Stage shows ====
Sanrio Puroland hosts a variety of stage shows (both regular and seasonal) in various areas. Selected past and present shows are as follows:

Märchen Theater

- KAWAII KABUKI (since March 10, 2018) - A kawaii-themed kabuki musical adaptation of the traditional Japanese folktale Momotaro. Created in collaboration with Shochiku.
- Hello Kitty in Wonderland (April 20, 2013 to January 31, 2018) - A musical adaptation of Alice in Wonderland created by Koike Shuichiro to commemorate Hello Kitty's 40th anniversary. Includes a musical revue portion at the end of the show produced by Takarazuka.
- Hello Kitty and the Wizard of Oz (April 13, 2009 to April 4, 2013) - A musical adaptation of The Wizard of Oz created by Koike Shuichiro to commemorate Hello Kitty's 35th anniversary. Includes a musical revue portion at the end of the show produced by Takarazuka.
- Hello Kitty's Nutcracker (June 6, 2006 to April 5, 2009) - Based on The Nutcracker. Includes a musical revue portion at the end of the show produced by Takarazuka.
- Hello Kitty's Journey Through Fairyland (April 23, 2004 to May 31, 2006)
- Hello Kitty Dream Revue 2 (March 26, 2002 to April 4, 2004)
- Hello Kitty Dream Revue 1 (March 10, 2000 to March 17, 2002)
- Sanrio Characters on Broadway!! (April 10, 1991 to January 30, 1992)

Fairyland Theater

- Beyond Words (since December 13, 2024)
- Wish Me Mell's Chance for You (November 2020 to October 14, 2024, shown interchangeably with MEMORY BOYS until October 2023)
- MEMORY BOYS: The Shop Selling Memories (June 30, 2018 to October 16, 2023)
- Little Hero (June 27, 2015 to May 26, 2018)
- My Melody and the Legend of Star and Flower (June 25, 2011 to May 24, 2015)
- Someday Saga (June 20, 2003 to May 8, 2011)
- Marron Cream's Love Fantasia (February 1999 to May 18, 2003)
- Monkichi's Magical Mystery (July 1996 to February 1999)
- Pochacco and Pekkle's Adventure (February 1992 to July 1996)

==== Other shows ====
Sanrio Puroland also hosts a daily fireworks show (during the summer) and various illumination shows.

=== Shops ===
- Entrance Shop - The largest shop in Puroland, located on the third floor. Original Puroland goods are available here. When the park first opened, it was called the “Souvenir Festival Plaza”. Inside the store was a castle and circus tent, and a moving trap bridge was built. Additionally, the cashier was set up inside of an enclosure similar to that of an Orient Express train car called the “Register Train,” and the entertainment part of shopping was displayed.
- Lady Kitty House Shop - A shop focused on selling Hello Kitty goods, located on the second floor of Sanrio Town. Original “Lady Kitty House” goods are also available here.
- My Melody & Kuromi Shop - Located directly above the entrance of Rainbow Hall on the fourth floor, Vivitix (a shop that closed on November 5, 2013, and was formerly Strawberry Lounge) was renovated. This is a shop focused on selling My Melody and Kuromi goods, some of which are exclusive to Puroland. Attached to this shop was a room decorated entirely with My Melody goods, which was renewed as a photo spot called “My Melody Garden” in 2020.
- Gudetama Shop - A shop focused on selling Gudetama goods, located on the third floor of Rainbow Hall.
- Village Shop - A shop that mostly sells stationery, plush toys, etc. and is located on the first floor of Puro Village.
- Duty-free counter - A tax-free counter that sells candy, plush toys, cameras, etc. located on the fourth floor of Rainbow Hall. The duty-free counter and duty-free services are no longer available as of November 17, 2023.
- Boat Ride Photo Corner - A shop located on the second floor of Puro Village that sells souvenir photos, headbands, etc. after exiting the Sanrio Character Boat Ride.

=== Restaurants ===
- Restaurant Yakata - A buffet-style restaurant located on the fourth floor of Rainbow Hall. Visitors are able to meet and take photos and/or videos with six different characters at random - Hello Kitty, Dear Daniel, Cinnamoroll, My Melody, PomPomPurin, and Wish Me Mell - at this restaurant. There is a 70-minute time limit. Installed at the information desk is a “reception system to reduce waiting time.” To know when their turn is called, customers receive a numbered ticket from the information desk and use their mobile device to scan the QR code found on the ticket. Until their turn is called, customers can freely roam around inside the park. Operation was suspended after its temporary closure in February 2020. In July 2020, the buffet was made available again. The same year, on August 10, the buffet format was suspended, and the restaurant reopened for business with a one-plate menu. As of 2022, greeting visitors at their seats has been suspended and characters appear onstage in the restaurant instead.
- Sanrio Rainbow World Restaurant (sponsored by Coca-Cola East Japan) - Located on the fourth floor of Rainbow Hall, this “Food Machine Restaurant” underwent renovation and reopened as a rainbow-themed food court-style restaurant on December 23, 2016. The restaurant interior is decorated with colorful rainbow-like decor. Mainly depicted are the associated colors and messages of seven Sanrio characters (Hello Kitty, My Melody, Little Twin Stars, PomPomPurin, Keroppi, Gudetama, and Cinnamoroll), and aside from this, their objet d’art is placed at the entrance of the restaurant. The menu features desserts decorated with Sanrio characters such as Hello Kitty and Gudetama, as well as other dishes that can be found in food machine restaurants, regardless of the typical clientele. Additionally, a limited-time menu supervised by Koji Matoba was available to celebrate the restaurant's opening. Seating capacity: 350 people.
- Character Food Court (sponsored by Coca-Cola East Japan) - A fast food-style food court/restaurant inside a renovated “gourmet bazaar”, located on the first floor of Sanrio Town. The menu is primarily aimed at young women and children, and features Japanese curries and desserts in the shape of characters like Hello Kitty, My Melody, etc., reminiscent of character bentos and food art, as well as the Sanrio characters that are popular on social media. Events like the “Character Curry General Election” are held periodically. Seating capacity: 524 people.

In addition to these restaurants, there is the Dream Café (formerly Tea Time Terrace, seating capacity: 65 people), located on the fourth floor of Rainbow Hall. For a limited time, the café operated as “My Melody Dream Café,” “Cinnamoroll Dream Café,” etc. (sponsored by Nissei) and offers original sweets and other items with character designs. Additionally, on the first floor of Puro Village is Sweet Parlor, which offers a selection of drinks, character-inspired ice creams, etc.

== Incidents ==
- In 2015, a five-year-old boy of foreign nationality fractured one of his fingers in the Sanrio Characters Boat Ride after reaching one of his hands out into the waterway and jamming it into one of the boats' metal stopper.
- On February 24, 2024, the park was closed after staff received an email saying that a "hazardous" object had been placed on the premises. A subsequent police search found no such item.
