= Fairies (Japanese group) =

Japanese idol girl group

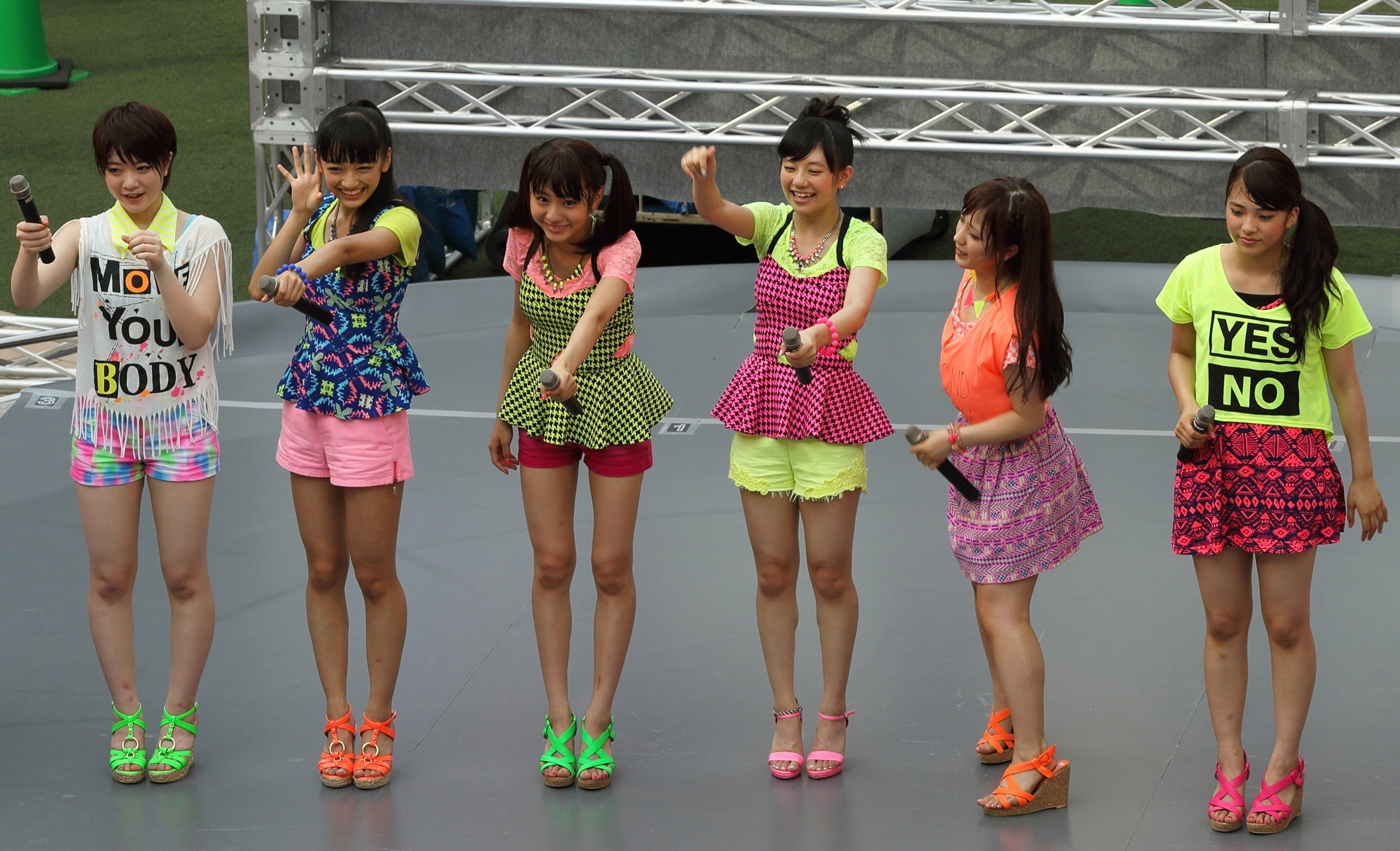
- Fairies on July 26, 2013

Background information
- Origin: Japan
- Genres: J-pop; pop; dance-pop; teen pop; bubblegum pop
- Years active: 2011–2020 (Note: By 2020 the remaining members have left the group, however due to the statement that the group did not disband, hence the group still have to focus on the individual activities)
- Label: Sonic Groove (Avex Group)
- Spinoffs: M Three
- Past members: Rikako Inoue; Sora Nomoto; Momoka Ito; Mahiro Hayashida; Miria Fujita; Miki Shimomura; Kawane Kiyomura
- Website: rising-pro.jp/artist/fairies/

Fairies (フェアリーズ) was a Japanese idol girl group, formed in 2011 and on an indefinite hiatus since 2020. They were managed by the talent agency Rising Production and produced by the Avex record label Sonic Groove.

== History ==
=== Pre-debut ===
Fairies were formed by the talent agency Vision Factory (now Rising Production), famous for successful artists such as Namie Amuro, MAX and Speed, under the concept of being a "world-class talented group that [would be] able to compete overseas." The members were chosen from 100 candidates who were attending dance schools affiliated with the agency and situated in 13 Japanese regions. During the three months preceding their debut, they lived together in a dormitory in Tokyo, and everyone attended the same school.

The group name was open for suggestions from the public through a special corner in Nippon TV programme Sukkiri!!, and "Fairies" was chosen with the explanation that their dancing form resembled a group of fairies fluttering.

=== 2011–2013: Debut and Kiyomura’s departure ===
The group debuted with the double A-side single "More Kiss / Song for You" on September 21, 2011. At the 53rd Japan Record Awards, held on December 30, 2011, Fairies were named the best newcomer of the year, receiving the Best New Artist award. Among other nominees, they beat 2NE1 and Super Girls. At the time of receiving the award, Fairies' average age of 13.6 was the lowest for this award, a record shared with °C-ute that won in 2007.

On January 17, 2013, the group's youngest member Kiyomura announced that she would be "restraining" from activities with Fairies due to educational issues, leaving the remaining six to continue. Although the group had been using the name "Fairies" in Latin script until then, from February onwards it was changed to Japanese on all their official sites and single jacket covers. However, no announcement was ever made about which was the official notation. On February 1, 2013, the subunit "M Three" (Mスリー) with Hayashida Mahiro, Fujita Miria, and Shimomura Miki as members was announced. The name was due to "M" being the initial of all three girls' given names. Their debut single "Yumemiru Dancing Doll" was released on March 27.

=== 2014–present: Subsequent releases, Fujita’s departure and group hiatus ===
Fairies released their eponymous first album on March 26, 2014. Included as a new song on the album was Ito's solo song "Poker Face", which later became the title song on Ito's solo debut single, released July 23. From August 9 to August 14, the group held their first live tour "Fairies LIVE TOUR 2014: Summer Party," which was released on DVD that December.

In January 2017, Fujita Miria announced that she would be withdrawing from the group in order to focus on her studies.

On June 17, 2020, it was announced by Rising Production that after several discussions with the members, Rikako Inoue, Sora Nomoto and Mahiro Hayashida decided to end their contract with the agency, with Rikako also retiring from show business. Momoka Ito and Miki Shimomura will remain in the agency working individually. Although the activities ended as a group, the agency revealed that the group have not disbanded and their future activities are "undecided". After working at a beauty company for two years, Rikako Inoue began a career as an adult actress under the name Yotsuha Kominato.

== Members ==
=== Former Members ===
Name	Birthdate _{(12)}	Color	Prefecture of origin	Slogan
Rikako Inoue (井上理香子)	May 29, 1996 (30)	Purple	Nagasaki	Small Nagasaki (スモール長崎)
Sora Nomoto (野元空)	Nov. 9, 1997 (28)	Blue	Kagoshima	Dancer girl from Kagoshima (鹿児島のダンス娘)
Momoka Ito (伊藤萌々香)	Dec. 15, 1997 (28)	Red	Saitama	Refreshing-type girl (サッパリ系女子); Main vocalist on the song "More Kiss", 1st single's 1st A-side
Mahiro Hayashida (林田真尋)	May 7, 1998 (28)	Yellow	Hyogo	Naturally cheerful sports girl (明るさ天然スポーツ少女)
Miria Fujita (藤田みりあ)	Jun. 15, 1998 (28)	Orange	Osaka	Powerful Kansai girl full of energy (元気いっぱいパワフル関西娘); Exclusive model for Nico Petit; former member of Next Generation, Left January 2017
Miki Shimomura (下村実生)	Oct. 22, 1998 (27)	Pink	Tokyo	Eccentric girl (不思議ちゃん); Exclusive model for Seventeen
Kawane Kiyomura (清村川音)	Jun. 2, 1998 (28)	Green	Kumamoto	Kumamoto's oasis (熊本のオアシス)

== Discography ==
=== Albums ===
Title	Album details	Charts
Title	Album details	JPN Oricon
Fairies	Released: March 26, 2014; Label: Sonic Groove; Format: CD, digital	14
Jukebox	Released: June 20, 2018; Label: Sonic Groove; Format: CD, CD+DVD, CD+Blu-ray	4

=== Singles ===
No.	Title	Release date	Charts		Album
No.	Title	Release date	JPN Oricon	JPN Billboard (Note: Sources for chart positions are as follows: "More Kiss", "Hero", "Sweet Jewel", "Beat Generation", "Tweet Dream", "White Angel", "Hikari no Hate ni", "Run With U", "Super Hero", "Bling Bling My Love", "Kiss Me Babe", "Sōshisōai Destination", "Mr.Platonic", "Crossroad", "Synchronized", "Koi no Roadshow", "Hey Hey ~Light Me Up~",)	Album
1	"More Kiss / Song for You"	September 21, 2011	11	6	Fairies
1	"More Kiss / Song for You"	September 21, 2011	11	—	Fairies
2	"Hero / Sweet Jewel"	December 21, 2011	9	10	Fairies
2	"Hero / Sweet Jewel"	December 21, 2011	9	37	Fairies
3	"Beat Generation / No More Distance"	April 4, 2012	5	3	Fairies
3	"Beat Generation / No More Distance"	April 4, 2012	5	—	Fairies
4	"Tweet Dream / Sparkle"	July 25, 2012	9	7	Fairies
4	"Tweet Dream / Sparkle"	July 25, 2012	9	—	Fairies
5	"White Angel"	November 14, 2012	5	18	Fairies
6	"Hikari no Hate ni" (光の果てに; "At the End of the Light")	July 24, 2013	6	17	Fairies
7	"Run with U"	February 19, 2014	8	58	Fairies
8	"Super Hero / Love Me, Love You More."	May 28, 2014	10	24	Jukebox
8	"Super Hero / Love Me, Love You More."	May 28, 2014	10	—	Jukebox
9	"Bling Bling My Love"	September 3, 2014	11	31	Jukebox
10	"Kiss Me Babe / Hirari" (ひらり; "Lightly")	March 25, 2015	5	28	Jukebox
10	"Kiss Me Babe / Hirari" (ひらり; "Lightly")	March 25, 2015	5	—	Jukebox
11	"Sōshisōai Destination" (相思相愛☆destination; "Mutual Love Destination")	July 15, 2015	5	32	Jukebox
12	"Mr.Platonic"	November 18, 2015	6	47	Jukebox
13	"Crossroad" (クロスロード)	August 10, 2016	3	11	Jukebox
14	"Synchronized" (シンクロ)	March 1, 2017	4	17	Jukebox
15	"Koi no Roadshow" (恋のロードショー; "Love Roadshow")	July 5, 2017	6	10	Jukebox
16	"Hey Hey ~Light Me Up~"	February 28, 2018	2	13	Jukebox
17	"Metropolis" (メトロポリス)	July 17, 2019	6	—	—N/a

=== Subunits' and solo singles ===
==== M Three ====
No.	Title	Release date	Charts	Album
No.	Title	Release date	JPN Oricon	Album
1	"Yumemiru Dancing Doll" (夢見るダンシングドール; "Dreaming Dancing Doll")	March 27, 2013	8	Non-album singles
2	"Your Love"	July 30, 2014	16	Non-album singles

==== Momoka Ito ====
No.	Title	Release date	Charts	Album
No.	Title	Release date	JPN Oricon	Album
1	"Poker Face"	July 23, 2014	16	Fairies

== Music videos ==
Year	Title	Director
2011	"More Kiss"	Unknown
2011	"Song for You"	Hideaki Sunaga
2011	"Hero"	Tatsuya Murakami
2011	"Sweet Jewel"	Tatsuya Murakami
2012	"Beat Generation"	Tatsuya Murakami
2012	"No More Distance"	Unknown
2012	"Tweet Dream"	Hideaki Sunaga
2012	"Sparkle"	Masaki Takehisa
2012	"White Angel"	Tatsuya Murakami
2013	"Yumemiru Dancing Doll" (by M Three)	Ryōtarō Muramatsu
2013	"Hikari no Hate ni"	Ryōtarō Muramatsu
2014	"Run with U"	Tatsuya Murakami
2014	"Super Hero"	Daisuke Ninomiya (Nino) / Ikioi
2014	"Poker Face" (by Momoka Ito)	Shintarō Ehara
2014	"Your Love" (by M Three)	Tatsuya Murakami
2014	"Bling Bling My Love"	Shintarō Ehara
2015	"Kiss Me Babe"	Shintarō Ehara
2015	"相思相愛☆destination"	Tomoo Noda
2015	"Mr.Platonic"	Tomoo Noda
2016	"Crossroad"	Ippei Morita
2017	"Synchronized"	Yoshiharu Seri
2017	"Koi no Roadshow"	Yoshiharu Seri
2018	"Hey Hey ~Light Me Up~"	Yoshiharu Seri
2018	"Bangin'"	

== Awards ==
Year	Nominee / work	Award	Result
2011	Fairies (group)	Japan Record Awards — New Artist	Won
2011	Fairies (group)	Japan Record Awards — Best New Artist	Won
2011	"More Kiss"	Japan Cable Awards — New Artist	Won
2012	"White Angel"	Japan Record Awards — Gold Award	Won
2012	"White Angel"	Japan Record Awards — Grand Prix	Nominated
2012	"Beat Generation"	Japan Cable Awards — Excellence Award	Won

== Notes ==
Preceded by S/mileage	Japan Record Award for Best New Artist; 2011	Succeeded by Leo Ieiri
