= CY8ER =

Japanese idol group

- CY8ER logo

Background information
- Origin: Japan
- Genres: J-pop, future bass, drum & bass
- Years active: 2015–2021
- Label: Icigo Style

CY8ER (pronounced as "cyber") was a Japanese alternative idol girl group. Formed by Ichigo Rinahamu and Nicamoq as BPM15Q in 2015, the group expanded and had five members by the time of their dissolution in January 2021. Their music was characterized by its peculiar EDM style with an added kawaii element.

== History ==
The group was founded as BPM15Q in 2015 by Ichigo Rinahamu (苺りなはむ), a former member of idol groups BiS and Akishibu Project, and Nicamoq, a DJ. The name BPM15Q was chosen as a reference to the two members: 15 for Ichigo Rinahamu (One is pronounced ichi and five is pronounced go, putting them together made ichigo) and Q for Nicamoq. The duo began releasing a series of songs, out of which "Hakuchu-mu" (はくちゅーむ) peaked at 3rd on iTunes' J-pop charts. In November 2016, BPM15Q released their first album titled BPM15Q All Songs via Ichigo Rinahamu's own label, Icigo Style. The album contained all of the songs the duo has released so far. In December 2016, the group announced the additions of two members: Koinumaru Pochi (小犬丸 ぽち), a former DJ, and Mashiro (ましろ), former member of idol group DEEP GIRL. December also saw the departure of Nicamoq. With the changes, the group renamed itself to "CY8ER".

The group released two singles before the additions of three more members in April 2017: Fujishiro Anna (藤城アンナ), former member of Ice Cream Suicide and Bellring Shōjo Heart; Naatan Koromushi (なぁたんコロ虫); and Yamiyume Yamii (病夢やみい). The six-person group soon made headlines for an event inviting fans to hug a member, but each member was wearing full chemical protective clothing. Naatan Koromushi left the group in March 2018. As of April 2014, four additional singles and one album were released.

The group disbanded on January 10, 2021, following their last live show at Nippon Budokan.

In April 2022, the original duo officially announced they will resuming their activities as BPM15Q under Victor Entertainment’s label.

== Members ==
=== Final lineup ===
- Ichigo Rinahamu (苺りなはむ)
- Koinumaru Pochi (小犬丸ぽち)
- Suzukawa Mashiro (涼川ましろ)
- Fujishiro Anna (藤城アンナ)
- Yamiyume Yammy (病夢やみい)

=== Former members ===
- Nicamoq (にかもきゅ)
- Naatan Koromushi (なぁたんコロ虫)

== Discography ==
=== Studio albums ===
Title	Album details	Peak chart positions	
Title	Album details	Oricon	Hot
Hello New Generation (ハローニュージェネレーション)	Released: January 31, 2018; Label: Icigo Style; Formats: CD, digital download	43	—
Tokyo (東京)	Released: January 22, 2020; Label: Victor Entertainment; Formats: CD, digital download	13	17

=== Compilation albums ===
Title	Album details	Peak chart positions	
Title	Album details	Oricon	Hot
CY8ER	Released: December 16, 2020; Label: Victor Entertainment; Formats: CD, digital download	21	37

=== Singles ===
Title	Year	Peak chart positions		Album
Title	Year	Oricon	Billboard	Album
"Remixtart" (リミックスタート)	2017	—	—	Hello New Generation
"Tetote" (手と手)	2017	—	—	Hello New Generation
"Kakushe-mu" (かくしぇーむ)	2017	—	—	Hello New Generation
"Dead Boy, Dead Girl" (デッドボーイ、デッドガール)	2019	27	—	Non-album singles
"Time Trip" (タイムトリップ)	2019	35	—	Non-album singles
"Summer / Sayonara Flashback" (サマー / さよならフラッシュバック)	2019	—	—	Non-album singles
"Endroll" (エンドロール)	2021	—	—	Non-album singles
"—" denotes releases that did not chart or were not released in that region.
