= Urya-Oi!!! =

Urya-oi!!!

Greatest hits album by BiS
- Released: July 2, 2014
- Genres: Pop punk; dance-punk; alternative metal; digital hardcore; metalcore
- Length: 64:26 Standard Edition; 103:28 Limited Editions
- Languages: Japanese, English
- Label: Avex Trax
- Producers: Kenta Matsukuma, JxSxK

BiS chronology
Who Killed Idol? (2014)	Urya-oi!!! (2014)	Brand-new idol Society 2 (2016)

Singles from Urya-oi!!!
- 1. "FiNAL DANCE / nerve" Released: May 28, 2014

Alternative covers
- Deluxe Edition Cover Art

Alternative cover
- BOX set Edition Cover Art

Urya-oi!!! (うりゃおい!!!) is the first and only "Best-of" album released by Japanese idol group BiS. The album contains tracks spanning the group's career, and all tracks that were originally released under an earlier lineup have been re-recorded by the 2014 lineup. The instrumental parts for most of the songs have also been re-recorded. The album contains one completely new song (Tada Naite), which is also the last song released by BiS before their initial disbandment. This album is the last CD release by the group before their disbandment.

== Releases ==
Three basic types of this album were released; A standard version with 1 CD and a random photo; A deluxe version with 2 CDs, a DVD and a random photo; a box set with 2 CDs, 3 DVDs, a photobook, a photograph set, a special sticker set and a random 3D mousepad of one of the six members. In addition, limited editions of the standard and deluxe editions featured the same content but with different covers.

A vinyl version was released on January 22, 2015.

== Track listing ==
Disc 1:Perfect Best
No.	Title	Lyrics	Music	Arranger(s)	Length
1.	"Give Me Your Love Zembu (FiNAL ver.)" (Give me your love 全部)	Pour Lui	Buzz72+	Buzz72+	3:49
2.	"BiS (FiNAL ver.)"	BiS&Dorimi	Kenta Matsukuma	Kenta Matsukuma	4:31
3.	"Taiyou no Jumon (FiNAL ver.)" (太陽の呪文)	MID	Kenta Matsukuma	Schtein&Longer	4:09
4.	"nerve (FiNAL ver.)"	Yoji Kubota	mifuu	Schtein&Longer	4:30
5.	"Let it Be (FiNAL ver.)" (レリビ)	JxSxK	Honoka Inaba	Ichiro Iguchi	3:47
6.	"My Ixxx (FiNAL ver.)"	BiS	Kenta Matsukuma	Kenta Matsukuma	3:45
7.	"primal. (FiNAL ver.)"	BiS	Kenta Matsukuma	Kenta Matsukuma	4:21
8.	"IDOL (FiNAL ver.)"	Iku Ryukyuji	Kenta Matsukuma	Kenta Matsukuma	3:43
9.	"PPCC (FiNAL ver.)"	BiS	Kenta Matsukuma	Buzz72+	3:35
10.	"BiSimulation (FiNAL ver.)"	BiS	Toru Hidaka	Kenta Matsukuma	3:16
11.	"DiE (FiNAL ver.)"	BiS	Kenta Matsukuma	Kenta Matsukuma	3:28
12.	"Fly (FiNAL ver.)"	BiS	Kenta Matsukuma	Kenta Matsukuma	4:10
13.	"STUPiG"	BiS	Takeshi Ueda	Takeshi Ueda	3:38
14.	"Hide out cut"	JxSxK	Kenta Matsukuma	Kenta Matsukuma	3:43
15.	"primal.2"	BiS	Kenta Matsukuma	Kenta Matsukuma	5:50
16.	"FiNAL DANCE"	BiS	Kenta Matsukuma	Kenta Matsukuma	4:33
17.	"Tada Naite" (ただ泣いて)	BiS	Kenta Matsukuma	Kenta Matsukuma	3:29
Total length:					64:26

BOX Set and Deluxe Editions Disc 2:Cover Best
No.	Title	Lyrics	Music	Arranger(s)	Length
1.	"Elegant no Kaibutsu (Note: SPANK HAPPY cover)" (エレガントの怪物)	Naruyoshi Kikuchi	Naruyoshi Kikuchi	Schtein&Longer	4:13
2.	"YAH YAH YAH (Note: Chage and Aska cover)"	ASKA	ASKA	SCRAMBLES	4:52
3.	"survival dAnce ~no no cry more~ (Note: TRF cover)"	Tetsuya Komuro	Tetsuya Komuro	Kenta Matsukuma	4:02
4.	"Our Song (Note: Shinichi Osawa cover)"	Akihiro Namba	Shinichi Osawa	Schtein&Longer	5:42
5.	"Demo Sayonara (Note: Dorothy Little Happy cover)" (デモサヨナラ)	Satoru Sakamoto	Satoru Sakamoto	Kenta Matsukuma	3:25
6.	"Ano Koro (BiS Kyoushuku version) (Note: Sayonara Ponytail cover)" (あの頃)	Fukkun	Fukkun	Kenta Matsukuma	4:54
7.	"Denden Passion (Note: Dempagumi.inc cover)" (でんでんぱっしょん)	Aki Hata / Mofuku-chan	Tamaya2060%	Kenta Matsukuma	4:02
8.	"Primal (Note: The Yellow Monkey cover)" (プライマル。)	Kazuya Yoshii	Kazuya Yoshii	Kenta Matsukuma	4:18
9.	"Suki Suki Daisuki (BiS Kaidan) (Note: Jun Togawa cover)" (好き好き大好き)	Jun Togawa	Yoichiro Yoshikawa	Jojo Hiroshige / Kenta Matsukuma	3:40
Total length:					39:02

BOX Set & Deluxe Editions Disc 3:Music Video Collection DVD
No.	Title	Length
1.	"BiS"
2.	"Paprika" (パプリカ)
3.	"nerve"
4.	"My Ixxx"
5.	"primal."
6.	"Aidoru" (アイドル (Idol))
7.	"IDOL"
8.	"PPCC"
9.	"IDOL is DEAD"
10.	"ASH"
11.	"Hitoribochi"
12.	"GET YOU w/Dorothy Little Happy"
13.	"BiSimulation"
14.	"Hide out cut"
15.	"DiE"
16.	"MURA-MURA"
17.	"Fly"
18.	"Hi"
19.	"STUPiG"
20.	"ODD FUTURE -Pour Lui ver.-" (プー・ルイ ver.)
21.	"ODD FUTURE -Nozomi Hirano ver.-" (ヒラノノゾミ ver.)
22.	"ODD FUTURE -First Summer Uika ver.-" (ファーストサマーウイカ ver.)
23.	"ODD FUTURE -Ten Tenko ver.-" (テンテンコ ver.)
24.	"ODD FUTURE -Saki Kamiya ver.-" (カミヤサキ ver.)
25.	"ODD FUTURE -Megumi Koshouji ver.-" (コショージメグミ ver.)
26.	"primal.2"
27.	"FiNAL DANCE"
28.	"Tada Naite" (ただ泣いて)

BOX Set Disc 4:BiS in Okinawa DVD
No.	Title	Length
1.	"BiS in Okinawa"

BOX Set Disc 5:BiS After All Tour Documentary DVD
No.	Title	Length
1.	"BiS After All Tour Documentary"

== Other items ==
All items come only with the box Set

- BiS's Attempt at an idol photo book (BiSなりのアイドル写真集)
- Special Boob Mousepad (特製BiSおっぱいマウスパッド)
  - Random boob mousepad of one of the six members
- Special Sticker (特性ステッカー)
- Mini-Photograph set (ミニ生写真)
  - BOX set gets all 7 types as a set. Other versions get one random photo.

== Personnel ==
- BiS – Lyrics on Tracks 2, 6, 7, 9, 10, 11, 12, 13, 14, 15 and 16
  - Pour Lui – Vocals; Lyrics on Track 1
  - Nozomi hirano – Vocals
  - First Summer Uika – Vocals (Except Disc 2 Tracks 1, 2, 3, 4, 5 and 6)
  - Ten Tenko – Vocals (Except Disc 2 Tracks 1, 2, 3, 4, 5 and 6)
  - Saki Kamiya – Vocals (Except Disc 2 Tracks 1, 2, 3, 4, 5 and 6)
  - Megumi Koshouji – Vocals (Disc 1 and Disc 2 Track 8)
- Ex.BiS
  - Yukiko Nakayama – Vocals on Disc 2 Tracks 1 and 2
  - Rina Yokoyama – Vocals on Disc 2 Track 1
  - Yufu Terashima – Vocals on Disc 2 Tracks 2, 3, 4, 5 and 6
  - Rio Michibayashi – Vocals on Disc 2 Tracks 3, 4, 5, 6, 7 and 9
  - Yurika Wakisaka – Vocals on Disc 2 Tracks 3, 4, 5 and 6
- Kenta Matsukuma – Sound Producer (Except Track 13); Guitar on Tracks 1, 2, 6, 7, 8, 9, 10, 11, 12, 14, 15 and 16; Programming on Tracks 9, 10 and 11
- Takeshi Ueda – Sound Producer and Guitar for Track 13
- Takeshi Otani – Guitar on Tracks 1, 12 and 15
- Tomoki Tokitou – Guitar on Track 2
- Takafumi Sakuma – Guitar on Track 3
- Satoshi Aoki – Guitar on Track 4
- Ichiro Iguchi – Guitar on Track 5; Programming on Tracks 5, 15 and 16
- Hisashi – Lead Guitar on Track 14
- Koji Ikuma – Guitar on Track 16
- Keita Kitajima – Bass guitar on Tracks 1 and 9
- Taizo Nakamura – Bass guitar on Tracks 2, 7, 11, 12, 14 and 15
- Takumi Asada – Bass guitar on Track 3
- Takenori Sakauchi – Bass guitar on Tracks 5 and 10
- Makoto Shirasaka – Bass guitar on Track 6
- Haruki – Bass guitar on Track 8
- Ohara Just Begun – Bass guitar on Track 16
- Takuya Kusunose – Drums on Tracks 1, 2, 5, 6, 7, 12 and 15
- Shouya Kamibayashi – Drums on Track 3
- Takashi Todoroki – Drums on Tracks 9, 10 and 11
- Toshiyuki Wakayama – Drums on Track 14
- Naoya Ito – Drums on Track 16
- Minoru Haeta – Piano on Track 3
- mifuu – Piano on Tracks 11, 12 and 15
- Keiji Yamaguchi – Piano on Track 14
- Ann Suhara – Violin on Tracks 3, 7 and 14
- Nobuhiro Nakagawa – Sax on Track 3
- Shun Yonehara – Trumpet on Track 3
- KKHRAI – Chorus on Track 3
- UKO – Chorus on Track 3
- Tifan – Chorus on Track 15
- Katsuto Matsuura – Executive Producer
- Mitsuru Yamaguchi – Executive Producer

== Notes ==
- All writing, arrangement and personnel credits taken from the album insert.
