= Are You Ready =

Are You Ready may refer to:

== Music ==
=== Albums ===
- Are You Ready? (Abraham Mateo album) or the title song, 2015
- Are You Ready (Blue Rodeo album) or the title song, 2005
- Are You Ready (Bucks Fizz album) or the title song, 1982
- Are You Ready (Shakaya album) or the title song (see below), 2006
- R U Ready?, by Lovelyz, or the title song, 2017
- Are You Ready!, by Atlanta Rhythm Section, 1979
- Are You Ready?, by David Meece, 1980
- Are You Ready?, by Pacific Gas & Electric, or the title song (see below), 1970

=== Songs ===
- "Are You Ready" (Aaliyah song), 1996
- "Are You Ready" (AC/DC song), 1990
- "Are You Ready?" (Bis song), 2019
- "Are You Ready" (The Chambers Brothers song), 1969
- "Are You Ready" (Disturbed song), 2018
- "Are You Ready?" (Fatty Gets a Stylist song), 2011
- "Are You Ready?" (In Case of Fire song), 2010
- "Are You Ready" (Joanne song), 2001
- "Are You Ready?" (Pacific Gas & Electric song), 1970
- "Are You Ready" (Shakaya song), 2005
- "Are You Ready" (Sly and the Family Stone song), 1968
- "Are U Ready?", by Pakito, 2007
- "R U Ready", by Salt-N-Pepa, 1997
- "Are You Ready", by Billy Ocean, 1980
- "Are You Ready", by Bob Dylan from Saved, 1980
- "Are You Ready?", by Boney James from Body Language, 1999
- "Are You Ready?", by Creed from Human Clay, 2000
- "Are You Ready?", by D-Crunch from M0527, 2019
- "Are You Ready?!", by Devo from Mighty Morphin Power Rangers The Movie: Original Soundtrack Album, 1995
- "Are You Ready", by Grand Funk Railroad from On Time, 1969
- "Are You Ready?", by Hazen Street from Hazen Street, 2004
- "Are You Ready", by James from Strip-mine, 1988
- "Are You Ready?", by KC and the Sunshine Band from KC Ten, 1983
- "Are You Ready?", by Måneskin from Il ballo della vita, 2018
- "Are You Ready?", by Mercury Rev from The Light in You, 2015
- "Are You Ready", by Miley Cyrus from Hannah Montana Forever, 2010
- "Are You Ready", by Moxy from Ridin' High, 1977
- "Are You Ready?", by Pebbles from Straight from My Heart, 1995
- "Are You Ready?", by RPA & The United Nations of Sound from United Nations of Sound, 2010
- "Are You Ready?", by the Sinceros, 1980
- "Are You Ready", by Thin Lizzy from Live and Dangerous, 1978
- "Are You Ready?", by Three Days Grace from Three Days Grace, 2003
- "Are U Ready", by Groove Coverage from Covergirl, 2002
- "Are You Red..Y", by the Clash from Cut the Crap, 1985
- "R U Ready", by Ringo Starr from Liverpool 8, 2008

== Theatre ==
- Are You Ready?, a 2001 play by David Auburn

== See also ==
- R. U. Reddy, a character in the Marvel Universe
