= Hijokaidan discography =

Hijōkaidan discography
- Studio albums: 31
- EPs: 4
- Live albums: 19
- Compilation albums: 4
- Video albums: 24
- Box sets: 5
- Splits: 4
- Compilation tracks: 37
- Promos: 4

The following is a discography of Japanese noise group Hijōkaidan (非常階段).

== Studio albums ==
Year	Title	Label	Note
1982	Originals	n/a	
1984	Live at Studio Ahiru	n/a	
1984	Viva Angel	Alchemy	
1984	King of Noise	Alchemy	
1986	Tapes	Alchemy	
1987	Limited Edition	Alchemy	
1988	No Paris / No Harm	Alchemy	
1989	Modern	Alchemy	
1990	Romance	Alchemy	
1991	Windom	Alchemy	
1997	Noise from Trading Cards	Alchemy	
1998	Speculum Kaidan	P-Tapes / Transparency	as Speculum Kaidan with Speculum Fight
2004	The Last Recording Album	Alchemy	
2012	Made in Studio	doubtmusic	with Akira Sakata
2013	Hatsune Kaidan (初音階段)	U-Rythmix	with Hatsune Miku
2013	BiS Kaidan (BiS階段)	Avex	as BiS Kaidan (BiS階段) with BiS
2013	Vacant World (からっぽの世界, Karappo no Sekai)	U-Rythmix	as Hatsune Kaidan (初音階段)
2014	I'll Never Fall in Love Again (恋よ、さようなら, Koi yo, Sayōnara)	U-Rythmix	as Hatsune Kaidan (初音階段)
2014	Saita Hana ga Hitotsu ni Nareba Yoi (咲いた花がひとつになればよい) -Hijokaidan 35th Anniversary Album-	Reveil	
2014	2nd Album	Jet Set	as BiS Kaidan (BiS階段)
2015	Watashi o Noise ni Tsuretette (私をノイズに連れてって)	Reveil	with You'll Melt More! (ゆるめるモ!)
2015	Noisy Killer	Alchemy	as Hatsune Kaidan (初音階段)
2015	Noise Join Inn	Reveil	with Otomo Yoshihide
2015	Emergency Stairway to Heaven	Cold Spring	
2015	Featuring Nasca Car	Alchemy	with Nasca Car
2016	Togawa Kaidan (戸川階段)	Reveil	with Jun Togawa
2016	Avan-Kaidan: Noise Daisakusen (あヴぁ階段〜恋のノイズ大作戦〜)	Reveil	with avandoned (あヴぁんだんど)
2016	Hatanaka Kaidan (畑中階段)	Reveil	with Yoko Hatanaka (畑中葉子)
2017	Destroy Noise Symphony	Reveil	
2019	Ken'iten (乾為天)	Reveil	
2020	Okinawa Kaidan: Saya no Yume wa Yoru Hiraku (沖縄階段〜彩の夢は夜ひらく)	Alchemy	as Saya Kaidan (彩階段) with Okinawa Electric Girl Saya

== Live albums ==
Year	Title	Label	Note
1982	Zōroku no Kibyō (蔵六の奇病)	Unbalance	
1986	Acid Soul	Alchemy	as Genbaku Kaidan (原爆階段) with The Genbaku Onanies
1988	Noise Violence and Destroy	Alchemy	as S.O.B. Kaidan (S.O.B.階段) with S.O.B.
2007	Both Noises End Burning	Les Disques Victo	with Borbetomagus
2008	Polar Nights Live	Pica Disk	
2012	Made in Japan – Live at Shinjuku Pit Inn, 9th April	doubtmusic	as Jazz Hijōkaidan (JAZZ非常階段) with Akira Sakata and Sabu Toyozumi
2013	Live at Akihabara Goodman, Tokyo, February 2nd, 2013	ototoy	with Hatsune Kaidan (初音階段) and Kamin Shirahata (白波多カミン)
2013	Hatsune Kaidan Live! (初音階段ライブ!)	Alchemy	as Hatsune Kaidan (初音階段)
2014	2014.5.6 BiS階段 Last Gig @ WWW	Alchemy	as BiS Kaidan (BiS階段)
2014	Kyoto Seibu Kōdō Live 1983.9.17 (京大西部講堂LIVE 1983.9.17)	Reveil	as Sta-Kaidan (スター階段) with The Stalin
2014	Kaitai-teki Kōkan: Mayonaka no Heavy Rock Party (解体的交歓〜真夜中のへヴィ・ロック・パーティ〜)	Reveil	with You'll Melt More! (ゆるめるモ!)
2015	Live in Tokyo 24 November 2013	Alchemy / Geometrik / Suezan Studio	as E.G.Kaidan with Esplendor Geométrico
2016	Togawa Kaidan Live! (戸川階段 LIVE!)	Reveil	with Jun Togawa
2016	Avan-Kaidan Live: Final Document & U.S.A. (あヴぁ階段 LIVE 〜Final Document & U.S.A.〜)	Reveil	with avandoned (あヴぁんだんど)
2016	Nihilism Live & U.S.A.	Reveil	
2018	Made in USA	Reveil	
2018	Live! Destroy Noise Symphony	Alchemy	
2019	Live in Kochi Chaotic Noise	Chaotic Noise Recordings	as Mikami Kaidan (三上階段) with Kan Mikami
2020	Doomsday Afternoon	NEUREC / LAFMS	with Doomsday Afternoon

== Compilation albums ==
Year	Title	Label	Note
2000	Jojo & Junko	Alchemy	
2000	Shūmatsu-Shorijō (終末処理場)	Alchemy	
2004	The Lord of Noise (真・雑音伝説, Shin zatsuon densetsu)	Imperial	CD+DVD
2009	MP3 Collection	Alchemy	CD-ROM

== Box sets ==
Year	Title	Label	Note
1983	Gokuaku no Kyōten (極悪の教典)	n/a	10 cassettes
1992	The Neverending Story of the King of Noise (雑音伝説, Zatsuon densetsu)	Alchemy	4 CDs
2009	The Noise	Alchemy	30 CDs
2014	The Original Album Remastered Edition Box	Reveil	13 CDs
2014	BiS Kaidan (BiS階段)	Avex	4 DVDs, 2 Blu-rays, 4 CDs

== EPs ==
Year	Title	Label	Note
1983	A Tribute to Icchie	n/a	
1992	Live at the Starlight Furniture Company	Charnel Music	with Trance and Allegory Chapel Ltd.
1997	Sound of the Sea	Xn	
1997	Ferocity of Practical Life	Fourth Dimension	

== Splits ==
Year	Title	Label	Note
1980	Shūmatsu-Shorijō (終末処理場)	Unbalance	with NG and Jurajium
1985	Δ8000 / Prelude to Pallo	Alchemy	with Incapacitants
2003	Split Series #01	Monotype	with BusRatch
2010	untitled	Harbinger Sound	with Airway

== Video albums ==
Year	Title	Label	Note
1984	Live '82 新宿ロフト	n/a	
1988	Live 超高速雑音楽体系	Alchemy	as S.O.B. Kaidan (S.O.B.階段) with S.O.B.
1988	Live and Confused	Alchemy / RRRecords	
1989	Onemore Red Nighmare	Alchemy	as S.O.B. Kaidan with S.O.B.
1989	(Do You Remember) Piss Factory?	Alchemy	
2007	Legendary Live Collection of Hijōkaidan Vol. 1	Alchemy Music Store	
2007	25th Anniversary Live	Alchemy Music Store	
2008	Legendary Live Collection of Hijōkaidan Vol. 2	Alchemy Music Store	
2008	Legendary Live Collection of Hijōkaidan Vol. 3	Alchemy Music Store	
2008	Legendary Live Collection of Hijōkaidan Vol. 4	Alchemy Music Store	
2008	Legendary Live Collection of Hijōkaidan Vol. 5	Alchemy Music Store	
2008	2008.4.6 (Sun) at Alchemy Music Store	Alchemy Music Store	as Toumeikaidan (とうめい階段) with Toumeirovo
2008	Legendary Live Collection of Hijōkaidan Vol. 6	Alchemy Music Store	
2008	Kill the King of Noise	Alchemy Music Store	as Acid Mothers Kaidan (Acid Mothers階段) with Acid Mothers Temple
2008	Live!	Alchemy Music Store	as Subvert Kaidan (Subvert階段) with Subvert Blaze
2008	Legendary Live Collection of Hijōkaidan Vol. 7	Alchemy Music Store	
2010	Legendary Live Collection of Hijōkaidan Vol. 8	Alchemy Music Store	
2010	A Story of the King of Noise	K&B Publishers	
2012	Live at Shinjuku Loft 2009.10.10	Alchemy / Uplink Records	as Genbaku Sta-Kaidan (原爆スター階段) with The Genbaku Onanies and The Stalin
2013	Hijokaidan File	K&B Publishers	videos from twelve different side projects
2014	2014.5.6 BiS階段 Last Gig @ WWW	Avex / Alchemy	as BiS Kaidan (BiS階段)
2014	Saita Hana ga Hitotsu ni Nareba Yoi: Kessei 35 Shūnenkinen Live (咲いた花がひとつになればよい〜結成35周年記念LIVE〜)	Reveil	
2014	Bible 1979–2014	Reveil	4 DVDs
2015	Watashi o Noise ni Tsuretette Live! (私をノイズに連れてってLIVE！)	Reveil	with You'll Melt More! (ゆるめるモ!) and Akira Sakata (坂田明)

== Compilation tracks ==
Year	Track	Title	Label	Note
1985	"Live at Sōzōdōjō"	Anti Music for Snobism	Beast 666 Tapes	
1985	untitled	Alchemy Noise Omnibus	Alchemy	with John Duncan
1986	"Live at 創造道場 11/3/1980"	Helter Skelter	Beast 666 Tapes	
1986	"Deschapelles Coup"	Dry Lungs II	Placebo	
1986	"Bad Charactor, but Great Sound (live)"	Dead Tech – No Wave from Japan	Dossier	
1987	"5 Years On"	Journey into Pain	Beast 666 Tapes	
1987	"A Tribute to Ichie"	Alchemism	Wechselbalg Syndicate	
1987	"B·A·D"	Alchemism	Wechselbalg Syndicate	
1989	"10 Years After"	Alchemism 2	Wechselbalg Syndicate	
1990	"Bundy"	Taste of Wild West 3	Wax	
1991	"Theme of the Taste of Wild West"	Japan Bashing Three	Public Bath	
1992	"No Particular"	Perceptual Motor Rhythm Skills	Stomach Ache	
1992	"Planeticket (excerpt)"	Dry Lungs V	Subterranean / Dark Vinyl	
1992	"Fandango"	Garbage Sandwich	Beast 666 Tapes	
1992	"Antiknock Out of Hijōkaidan"	Dedication	Freundwerk / Artware	
1992	"Ambassador Extraordinary and Plenipotentiary"	World Record	Alchemy	
1992	"Live at Fandango Juso, Osaka, 6. OCT, 1991"	Oh! Moro Volume 5	Maru Ka Batsu (○か×)	with Seiichi Yamamoto
1993	"Cancer of Music"	Dedication -Zweite Auslese-	Artware	
1993	"Sound of Bay Area"	Land of the Rising Noise	Charnel Music	
1993	"Live at La Mama"	Kingdom of Noise	Endorphine Factory	
1994	"Random Canoe Inspection"	Extreme Music from Japan	Susan Lawly	
1995	"Setting Up"	The Japanese / American Noise Treaty	Release	
1995	"Live at Fandango, Osaka "Alchemy Records 10th Anniversary" 3rd Sept. 1994"	Good Alchemy Video	Alchemy	
1997	"Shabai Hanjo"	Screw	Entartete Kunst	
2000	"Live at 20000V, 2000/6/11 (excerpt)"	Aiyoku Jinmin 21 Seiki (愛欲人民二十一世紀)	Alchemy	
2003	"No Canada"	No Tribute – Music of the Nihilist Spasm Band	Carbon / Sunship / Breathmint / Little Mafia	
2003	"Live at Shinjuku Loft. August 29th 1981 (digest)"	Get the Punk – J Punk & New Wave 1972–1991	Imperial	
2004	"Circles"	Alchemism – Alchemy Records 20th Anniversary Twin Best Collection	Imperial	
2004	untitled	Alchemy & P.S.F. 20th Anniversary Campaign	Alchemy / P.S.F.	CD
2004	"Live at Shibuya La Mama 1999"	Alchemy & P.S.F. 20th Anniversary Campaign	Alchemy / P.S.F.	DVDr
2005	"25 Years"	Alchemism DVD	Imperial	
2006	"Shinjuku Loft, August 29, 1981"	Rock Is Loft -Red Disc- ~Shinjuku Loft 30th Anniversary~	Sony	
2008	"Dog House Chop Chop"	Japanoise of Death II	Steinklang	
2009	"Return Meidaimae"	Tonwellen 2	Labor für akustische Grenzprobleme / Atacama	
2010	"Untitled (unreleased studio outtake, recorded on 24th, Oct. 1994)"	An Anthology of Noise & Electronic Music / Sixth A-Chronology 1957-2010	Sub Rosa	
2013	"20121118 非常階段 Live at 四谷Outbreak ver2"	Play for Japan 2013 Vol. 2 〜沸きあがる的な〜	OTOTOY	
2014	"Untitled"	Multiple Tap	Multiple Tap	

== Promos ==
Year	Title	Note
2004	A Tribute to Icchie	CDr available with purchase of Alchemism – Alchemy Records 20th Anniversary Twin Best Collection
2012	untitled	CDr available with purchase of both Made in Japan and Made in Studio
2012	Shūnōkaidan (首脳会談)	CDr available with purchase of Zōroku no Kibyō 30th Anniversary edition.
2012	Last Answer	CDr available with purchase of Zōroku no Kibyō 30th Anniversary edition
