= Brand-new idol Society 2 =

Studio album by Bis
- Released: November 16, 2016
- Genre: Pop punk; dance-punk; alternative metal
- Length: 52:14
- Language: Japanese, English
- Label: Tsubasa Records
- Producer: Kenta Matsukuma, JxSxK

Bis chronology
| Urya-Oi!!! (2014) | Brand-new idol Society 2 (2016) | Re:Stupid (2017) |

Brand-new idol Society 2 is the fourth album by Japanese idol group Bis. It was released through the independent label Tsubasa Records on November 16, 2016. The album is the first physical release by the group after their reformation in 2016, and features a brand-new lineup of members. The album consists of re-recorded versions of tracks from the group's independent label days, together with five new songs. An early version of the song "BisBis" featuring only Pour Lui was released as a free download on July 8, 2016, the day the group's reformation was announced. The album version of the track has been re-recorded with the new members. All of the album's tracks were released on SoundCloud prior to the album's release, with the exception of "Change the World" which was released as a music video on YouTube.

== Track listing ==
| No. | Title | Lyrics | Music | Length |
|---|---|---|---|---|
| 1. | "Give me your Love Zenbu" (Give me your love 全部) | Pour Lui | Buzz72+ | 3:46 |
| 2. | "My Ixxx" | Bis | Kenta Matsukuma | 3:43 |
| 3. | "Nerve" | Yoji Kubota | Mifuu | 4:16 |
| 4. | "Primal." | Bis | Kenta Matsukuma | 4:21 |
| 5. | "BisBis" | Pour Lui & JxSxK | Kenta Matsukuma | 4:23 |
| 6. | "Human After All" | Iku Ryukyuji | Kenta Matsukuma | 3:32 |
| 7. | "Idol" | Iku Ryukyuji | Kenta Matsukuma | 3:42 |
| 8. | "Happy Birthday" | Aya Eightprince & JxSxK | Kenta Matsukuma | 3:24 |
| 9. | "Let It Be" (レリビ) | JxSxK | Honoka Inaba | 3:43 |
| 10. | "Not Special" | Pour Lui | Kenta Matsukuma | 4:29 |
| 11. | "Bis" | Bis & Dorimi | Kenta Matsukuma | 4:32 |
| 12. | "Taiyō no Jumon" (太陽のじゅもん) | MID | Kenta Matsukuma | 4:12 |
| 13. | "Change the World" | JxSxK | Ichiro Iguchi | 4:05 |

== Personnel ==
- Bis
  - Pour Lui – vocals; Lyrics on Tracks 1, 5 and 10
  - Aya Eightprince – vocals; lyrics on Track 8
  - Peri Ubu – vocals
  - Kika Front Frontale – vocals
  - Go Zeela – vocals

== Charts ==
Chart performance for Our Parade
| Chart | Peak position |
|---|---|
| Japanese Albums (Oricon) | 24 |
| Japanese Hot Albums (Billboard Japan) | 27 |

== Notes ==
- All writing, arrangement and personnel credits taken from the album insert.
