= Ichigo Rinahamu =

Japanese idol

Ichigo Rinahamu りなはむ苺
- Also known as: Rina Yokoyama (ヨコヤマリナ)
- Born: Rina Yokoyama (横山利奈); Yokohama, Kanagawa, Japan
- Genres: J-pop
- Years active: 2010–present
- Labels: JVCKenwood Victor Entertainment
- Formerly of: Bis; Akishibu Project; CY8ER

Ichigo Rinahamu (りなはむ苺), also known as Rina Yokoyama (横山利奈 or ヨコヤマリナ) or simply Rinahamu (りなはむ), is a Japanese vocalist and idol. She is a former member of CY8ER, Bis, Akishibu Project and Strawberry Syndrome.

== Career ==
=== 2010–2014: BiS and Akishibu Project ===
On 25 October 2010, Rina Yokoyama was revealed to be one of the four founding members of new idol group Bis, under the stage name ヨコヤマリナ, which is her name written in katakana. As a member, Yokoyama Rina participated in Bis' debut single, "Taiyou no Jumon" (太陽のじゅもん), and their debut album, Brand-new idol Society. In June 2011, Yokoyama decided to leave the group due to her disagreements with the direction the group was taking. She then worked as a model to the now-defunct fashion magazine Nicky under her name written in kanji.

On 5 October 2012, Yokoyama announced that she was creating a new idol group named Akishibu Project with the aim of "merging the cultures of Shibuya with Akihabara." During this time, she went by the stage name "Rinahamu" (りなはむ). Originally composed of Rinahamu and two other members, the group expanded and held regular performances at Twinbox Akihabara. Rinahamu left the group on 11 May 2014, and a graduation concert was held in her honor. She also attended BiS' dissolution concert on 8 July 2014.

=== 2014–present: solo career, CY8ER, and Strawberry Syndrome ===
On 15 September 2014, she once again changed her stage name to Ichigo Rinahamu and held a concert at AkibaArena, a maid café, where she announced the release of a self-titled single on 15 October. She said that if 5,000 singles aren't sold within three months, she would retire as an idol. Then, on 3 December 2014, she paired up with Yōnapi from the band You'll Melt More! to release the single "Kiramekiraririkaru" (きらめきらりりかる). On 1 May 2015, she released the single "Hamu Tail" (はむテール。).

On 31 May 2015, Ichigo Rinahamu announced that she would pair with Nicamoq, a DJ, to create a new idol group named "BPM15Q", which would later become CY8ER. On 16 August 2015, she released a solo single, "Poisute, Dame, Dame!" (ポイ捨て、ダメ、ダメ！, lit. littering, no, no), in response to an alleged 2014 image that showed her littering on a train.

Ichigo Rinahamu also created a short-lived band named Strawberry Syndrome (ストロベリー症候群), which was founded on 23 April 2016. She was the vocalist of the band. The group had a total of seven members and produced one single, a remake of the vocaloid song "Melancholic" (メランコリック) by Junky, released on 28 June 2016. A five-member subunit managed by Ichigo Rinahamu called Doping Berry was created on 10 August 2016. Both were disbanded on 13 July 2017.

In April 2021, Ichigo Rinahamu announced that she would be holding auditions for an idol group that she would produce. The group debuted as HO6LA in October 2021.

== Discography ==
=== Singles ===
Release date	Title
15 October 2014	"Ichigo Rinahamu" (苺りなはむ)
1 May 2015	"Hamu Tail" (はむテール。)
16 August 2015	"Poisute, Dame, Dame!" (ポイ捨て、ダメ、ダメ！)

=== As Strawberry Syndrome ===
Release date	Title
3 December 2014	"Melancholic" (band ver.) (メランコリック (band ver.))

=== As featured artist ===
Release date	Title	Artist
28 June 2017	"Kiramekiraririkaru" (きらめきらりりかる)	Yōnapi x Ichigo Rinahamu
9 March 2018	"White Voice" (+Voice Version)	Yasutaka Nakata feat. Ichigo Rinahamu
