= Bisukete =

Greatest hits album by BiS
- Released: September 26, 2012
- Genre: Pop punk; dance-punk; alternative metal
- Length: 24:27
- Language: Japanese, English
- Label: Avex Trax
- Producer: Kenta Matsukuma, JxSxK

BiS chronology
Brand-new idol Society (2011)	Bisukete (2012)	Idol Is Dead (2012)

Bisukete (びすけて) is a compilation mini-album released by Japanese idol group BiS as an exclusive at Village Vanguard. The album contains tracks from various singles, as well as a track from their first album Brand-new idol Society. The artwork was designed by Kyosuke Usuta.

== Track listing ==
No.	Title	Lyrics	Music	Arranger(s)	Length
1.	"survival dAnce -no no cry more-"	Tetsuya Komuro	Tetsuya Komuro	Kenta Matsukuma	4:04
2.	"My Ixxx"	BiS	Kenta Matsukuma	Kenta Matsukuma	3:41
3.	"gugigi"	JxSxK	Ichiro Iguchi	Kenta Matsukuma	4:10
4.	"PPCC"	BiS	Kenta Matsukuma	Buzz72+	3:33
5.	"primal."	BiS	Kenta Matsukuma	Kenta Matsukuma	4:26
6.	"BiS"	BiS & Dorimi	Kenta Matsukuma	Kenta Matsukuma	4:33

== Personnel ==
- BiS - Lyrics on Tracks 2, 4, 5 and 6
  - Pour Lui – vocals
  - Nozomi Hirano – vocals
  - Yufu Terashima – vocals (except Track 6)
  - Rio Michibayashi – vocals (Tracks 1 and 4)
  - Yurika Wakisaka – vocals (Tracks 1 and 4)
- Ex BiS
  - Yukiko Nakayama – vocals (Tracks 2, 3, 5 and 6)
  - Rina Yokoyama – vocals (Track 6)
- Kenta Matsukuma – Sound producer;Programming
- Masahiro Inzuka – Guitar
- Keita Kitajima – Bass guitar
- Tabokun – Bass guitar
- Takashi Todoroki – Drums

== Notes ==
- All writing, arrangement and personnel credits taken from the album insert.
