= Brand-new idol Society (2019 album) =

Studio album by Bis
- Released: August 14, 2019
- Genres: Pop punk; dance-punk
- Length: 52:43
- Language: Japanese
- Label: Nippon Crown

Bis chronology
Re:Stupid (2017)	Brand-new idol Society (2019)	Lookie (2020)

Brand-new idol Society is the sixth studio album from Japanese girl group Bis. It was released on August 14, 2019, by Nippon Crown and consists of thirteen tracks. It is the first release by the third iteration of Bis and shares its name with Bis' debut album. After the departure of Manako Chiii Manako the album was re-recorded and re-released on January 29, 2020, with the title Brand-new idol Society (New Type Ver.).

== Track listing ==
Brand-new idol Society track listing
No.	Title	Lyrics	Music	Length
1.	"Stupid"	Kenta Matsukuma, JxSxK	Kenta Matsukuma	4:03
2.	"Bis - Dōyara Zombie no o Demashi" (Bis-どうやらゾンビのおでまし-)	Kenta Matsukuma, JxSxK	Kenta Matsukuma	5:02
3.	"Surrender"	Kenta Matsukuma, JxSxK	Kenta Matsukuma	4:10
4.	"Refrain" (リフレイン)	Kenta Matsukuma, JxSxK	Kenta Matsukuma	5:15
5.	"Bis3"	Kenta Matsukuma, JxSxK	Kenta Matsukuma	3:30
6.	"This is not a Love Song"	Jiiku Ryugu	Satoshi Toyosumi	3:48
7.	"1,2,3!!!"	Kenta Matsukuma, Neo Trees	Kenta Matsukuma	4:03
8.	"Absolutely Meeeeee!!"	Kenta Matsukuma, JxSxK	Kenta Matsukuma	3:50
9.	"Nan Desuka?" (ナンデスカ?)	Toggy	Ichiro Iguchi	3:19
10.	"Thousand Crickets"	Kenta Matsukuma, JxSxK	Kenta Matsukuma	4:11
11.	"Teacher Teacher Teacher"	Ito Musensiteebu, JxSxK	Kenta Matsukuma	3:23
12.	"Strawberry Girl"	Manako Chiii Manako, JxSxK	Kenta Matsukuma	4:02
13.	"Let's Go Dōmo" (Let's Go どうも)	Kenta Matsukuma, JxSxK	Kenta Matsukuma	4:01
Total length:				52:43

== Charts ==
Chart performance for Brand-new idol Society
Chart	Peak position
Japanese Albums (Oricon)	9
Japanese Hot Albums (Billboard Japan)	13
