= Who Killed Idol? =

WHO KiLLED IDOL?

Studio album by BiS
- Released: March 5, 2014
- Genre: Punk rock; ska punk; digital hardcore; metalcore
- Length: 58:44
- Language: Japanese, English
- Label: Avex Trax
- Producer: Kenta Matsukuma, JxSxK

BiS chronology
| Idol is dead (2012) | WHO KiLLED IDOL? (2014) | Urya-Oi!!! (2014) |

Singles from WHO KiLLED IDOL?
- 1. "GET YOU" Released: January 9, 2013; 2. "BiSimulation" Released: March 13, 2013; 3. "DiE" Released: June 26, 2013; 4. "Fly / Hi" Released: September 18, 2013; 5. "STUPiG" Released: January 22, 2014

Alternate Covers
- Covers for the Six CD Release Types

Alternative cover
- Cover for limited LP version

Who Killed Idol? (stylized 'WHO KiLLED IDOL?') is the third studio album by Japanese idol group BiS, released on March 5, 2014. It is the last studio album released by the group before they disbanded in July 2014, and the only studio album to feature members First Summer Uika, Tentenko, Saki Kamiya and Megumi Koshouji. The album was released following a period of multiple changes in the BiS lineup, resulting in some tracks featuring members that were no longer part of the group by the time the album was released. The album continues the basic style of their previous albums, but shows more variety in the various styles of rock and pop featured in the tracks: "STUPiG" showcases a digital hardcore sound, "Hi" takes a step into upbeat punk rock, and "MURA-MURA" ventures into SKA-core. The pattern of including a cover track is continued, with "Primal" by The Yellow Monkey being included as the final track. The original version of this track also happened to be the last song The Yellow Monkey released before they disbanded, adding to its significance in the album.

== Guests ==
The album features many famous Japanese rock musicians, either performing on the songs or providing music for songs. "STUPiG" is written and arranged by Takeshi Ueda of AA= and The Mad Capsule Markets; "Hi" is written by Akihiro Namba of Hi-Standard; "MURA-MURA" is written and arranged by Noriaki Tsuda of Kemuri, who also plays bass on the track as well; "BiSimulation" is written by Toru Hidaka of Beat Crusaders; The guitar solo of "primal.2" is performed by Hisashi of Glay, who is also a fan of BiS. "GET YOU" is a collaboration track with fellow Avex idols Dorothy Little Happy and is taken from the collaboration single of the same name.

== Track listing ==
| No. | Title | Lyrics | Music | Arranger(s) | Length |
|---|---|---|---|---|---|
| 1. | "primal.2" | BiS | Kenta Matsukuma | Kenta Matsukuma | 5:48 |
| 2. | "DiE" | BiS | Kenta Matsukuma | Kenta Matsukuma | 3:27 |
| 3. | "STUPiG" | BiS | Takeshi Ueda | Takeshi Ueda | 3:36 |
| 4. | "no regret" | Megumi Koshouji | Takumi Asada | Takumi Asada | 3:21 |
| 5. | "Magumato" (マグマト) | First Summer Uika | Schtein&Longer | Schtein&Longer | 4:04 |
| 6. | "GET YOU" (with Dorothy Little Happy) | BiS & Dorothy Little Happy | Kenta Matsukuma | Kenta Matsukuma | 4:05 |
| 7. | "MURA-MURA" | Ten Tenko | Noriaki Tsuda | Noriaki Tsuda | 4:15 |
| 8. | "MMGK" | Saki Kamiya | Kenta Matsukuma | Kenta Matsukuma | 3:38 |
| 9. | "BiSimulation" | BiS | Toru Hidaka | Kenta Matsukuma | 3:15 |
| 10. | "ERROR" | Nozomi Hirano | Keita Tanaka | Keita Tanaka | 3:53 |
| 11. | "nasty face" | Pour Lui | Kenta Matsukuma | Ichiro Iguchi | 4:26 |
| 12. | "Fly" | BiS | Kenta Matsukuma | Kenta Matsukuma | 4:08 |
| 13. | "Hi" | Saki Kamiya | Akihiro Namba | Kenta Matsukuma | 2:55 |
| 14. | "Hide out cut (WHO KiLLED IDOL? ver)" | JxSxK | Kenta Matsukuma | Kenta Matsukuma | 3:43 |
| 15. | "Primal" (プライマル。) | Kazuya Yoshii | Kazuya Yoshii | Kenta Matsukuma | 4:18 |

Movie Edition Disc 2: IDOL is DEAD 2 DVD
| No. | Title | Length |
|---|---|---|
| 1. | "IDOL is DEAD 2 ~Nonchan's Propaganda War~ -Special Edition-" (アイドル・イズ・デッド -ノンちゃんのプロパガンダ大戦争-"Special Edition-") |

MV Edition Disc 2: Music Video DVD
| No. | Title | Length |
|---|---|---|
| 1. | "ASH" |
| 2. | "Hitoribochi" |
| 3. | "GET YOU w/Dorothy Little Happy" |
| 4. | "BiSimulation" |
| 5. | "Hide out cut" |
| 6. | "DiE" |
| 7. | "MURA-MURA" |
| 8. | "Fly" |
| 9. | "Hi" |
| 10. | "STUPiG" |
| 11. | "ODD FUTURE -Pour Lui ver.-" (プー・ルイ ver.) |
| 12. | "ODD FUTURE -Nozomi Hirano ver.-" (ヒラノノゾミ ver.) |
| 13. | "ODD FUTURE -First Summer Uika ver.-" (ファーストサマーウイカ ver.) |
| 14. | "ODD FUTURE -Ten Tenko ver.-" (テンテンコ ver.) |
| 15. | "ODD FUTURE -Saki Kamiya ver.-" (カミヤサキ ver.) |
| 16. | "ODD FUTURE -Megumi Koshouji ver.-" (コショージメグミ ver.) |
| 17. | "primal.2" |

== Personnel ==
- BiS - Lyrics on Tracks 1, 2, 3, 6, 9 and 12
  - Pour Lui – vocals; Lyrics on Track 11
  - Nozomi Hirano – vocals; Lyrics on Track 10
  - First Summer Uika – vocals (except Tracks 6 and 9); Lyrics on Track 5
  - Tentenko – vocals (except Tracks 6 and 9); Lyrics on Track 7
  - Saki Kamiya – vocals (except Tracks 6 and 9); Lyrics on Tracks 8 and 13
  - Megumi Koshouji – vocals (except Tracks 2, 6, 7, 9, 12 and 13); Lyrics on Track 4
- Ex.BiS
  - Yurika Wakisaka – vocals on Tracks 6 and 9
  - Yufu Terashima – vocals on Tracks 6 and 9
  - Rio Michibayashi – vocals on Tracks 2, 6, 7, 9, 12 and 13
- Dorothy Little Happy – vocals on Track 6
- Kenta Matsukuma – Sound producer (except Tracks 3 and 7); Guitar on Tracks 1, 2 and 13; Programming on Tracks 2, 6, 9 and 14
- Takeshi Ueda – Sound producer, Programming and Guitar on Track 3
- Noriaki Tsuda – Sound producer and Bass guitar on Track 7
- Hisashi – Lead Guitar on Track 1
- Ryoma – Guitar on Track 7
- Takafumi Sakuma – Guitar on Track 5
- Yoshihiro Nakagawa – Guitar and Sax on Track 15
- Ichiro Iguchi – Guitar on Tracks 6 and 11; Programming on Track 13
- Ikuma Gallagher – Guitar on Track 14
- Koji Ikuma – Guitar on Track 14
- Takeshi Otani – Guitar on Track 4 and 12
- Shinnosuke – Guitar on Track 8
- Keita Tanaka – Guitar on Track 10
- Takumi Asada – Bass Guitar on Tracks 4 and 15
- Makoto Shirasaka – Bass Guitar on Track 13
- Shinji Taira – Bass Guitar on Track 11
- Taizo Nakamura – Bass Guitar on Tracks 1, 2, 8, 12 and 14
- Haruki – Bass Guitar on Track 10
- Mako – Drums on Track 7
- Takuya Kusunose – Drums on Tracks 11 and 12
- Takashi Todoroki – Drums on Tracks 2, 9, 10, 14 and 15
- Toshiyuki Wakayama – Drums on Tracks 1 and 13
- Dorapo – Drums on Track 4
- mifuu – Piano on Tracks 2 and 12
- Yohei freedom – Piano on Track 1
- Keiji Yamaguchi – Piano on Track 14
- Anzu Suhara – Violin on Track 1
- Clutch – Organ and Keyboards on Track 7
- Mai – Trumpet on Track 7
- Hiroyuki Suka – Trombone on Track 7
- Muraian – Trombone on Track 7
- some – Programming assistant on Tracks 1, 4, 5, 8, 10, 11 and 15
- Kazuki Sato – Programming assistant on Tracks 1, 4, 5, 8, 10, 11 and 15
- Katsuto Matsuura – executive producer
- Hikaru Yamaguchi – executive producer

== Notes ==
- All writing, arrangement and personnel credits taken from the album insert.
