= Nevermind (disambiguation) =

Nevermind is a 1991 album by American rock band Nirvana.

Nevermind or Never mind may also refer to:

- Never Mind (video game), a 1989 video game by MC Lothlorien
- Nevermind (2015 video game), by Flying Mollusk
- Never Mind, a 1992 novel by Edward St Aubyn
- Never Mind! : A Twin's Novel, a 2004 children's book by Avi and Rachel Vail
- "Never mind" (Saturday Night Live), a frequent exclamation of fictional character Emily Litella
- "Nevermind" (Friday Night Lights), a 2007 episode of Friday Night Lights

== Music ==
=== Songs ===
- "Never Mind" (Cliff Richard song), a 1959 song written by Ian Samwell
- "Never Mind", a 1987 song by the Replacements from Pleased to Meet Me
- "Nevermind", a 1985 song by Red Hot Chili Peppers from Freaky Styley
- "Nevermind (What Was It Anyway)", a 2000 song by Sonic Youth from NYC Ghosts & Flowers
- "Never Mind" (Jann Arden song), 2001
- "Nevermind" (The Birthday Massacre song), 2004
- "Nevermind", a 2014 song by Foster the People from Supermodel
- "Nevermind", a 2020 song by Hrvy
- "Nevermind", a 2014 song by Leonard Cohen from Popular Problems
- "Nevermind" (Dennis Lloyd song), a 2016 song by Israeli Dennis Lloyd
- "Nevermind", a 2018 song by Jess Glynne from Always In Between
- "Never Mind", a 2020 song by Lil Wayne from Funeral
- "Never Mind", a 2023 song by Nancy Kwai from Premiere

=== Albums ===
- Nevermind, a 2006 album by Clockcleaner
- Never Mind (Bis album), 2024

== See also ==
- Never You Mind, a 2000 album by the New Amsterdams
- Newermind, a 2011 Nirvana tribute album
- Nevermind Tribute, a 2012 Nirvana tribute album
- Whatever Nevermind, a 2015 Nirvana tribute album
