= Idol Is Dead =

IDOL is DEAD

Studio album by BiS
- Released: October 24, 2012
- Genre: Pop punk; dance-punk; alternative metal
- Length: 49:33
- Language: Japanese, English
- Label: Avex Trax
- Producer: Kenta Matsukuma, JxSxK

BiS chronology
Bisukete (2012)	IDOL is DEAD (2012)	Who Killed Idol? (2014)

Singles from IDOL is DEAD
- 1. "My Ixxx" Released: August 3, 2011; 2. "primal." Released: December 21, 2011; 3. "Idol" Released: April 11, 2012

Alternative covers
- Artwork for the 5 CD release types

Idol is Dead (stylized IDOL is DEAD) is the second studio album released by Japanese idol group BiS on October 28, 2012. It is their first original album released on a major label, as well as the first (and only) full album released with the "Quintet" lineup (Pour Lui, Nozomi Hirano, Yufu Terashima, Rio Michibayashi, and Yurika Wakisaka). The album continues the style of BiS's previous releases, containing songs of different types of rock. It also continues the tradition of their studio albums containing a cover, in this case Shinichi Osawa's "Our Song", arranged in a Shoegaze style. The four tracks ("nerve", "My Ixxx", "primal." and "IDOL") from their independent label days have been re-recorded.

== Releases ==
Three basic types of the album were released; A standard edition with 1 CD (limited pressings also contained a random photo); A "Movie" edition with 1 CD and a DVD containing the film "IDOL is DEAD -The Movie-" which the group starred in, as well as live footage from their performance at "MOOSIC LAB Re:KICK OFF PARTY!"; A "MV" edition with 1 CD and a DVD containing all of the group's music videos released at the time. In addition, limited editions of the "Movie" and "MV" editions featuring alternate paper sleeve covers and including a random photo were released, bringing the total number of versions to 5.

== Cover art ==
The artwork for this album, being BiS's first album on a major label, helped identify and emphasise the shock oriented "Un-Idol like" image that they would go on to be known for. The artwork for the limited editions of the "MV" and "Movie" editions show the members posing while being placed in a Guillotine. The artwork for the standard versions shows the members trapped behind bars resembling a jail cell. These covers, combined with the album title, produced an image quite different from other idol groups when released.

== Track listing ==
No.	Title	Lyrics	Music	Arranger(s)	Length
1.	"IDOL is DEAD"	CHARLeS STeART.jr	Kenta Matsukuma	Kenta Matsukuma	2:50
2.	"ASH"	BiS	Kenta Matsukuma	Kenta Matsukuma	3:25
3.	"PPCC"	BiS	Kenta Matsukuma	Buzz72+	3:35
4.	"BLEW"	Rio Michibayashi	Kenta Matsukuma	Kenta Matsukuma	3:51
5.	"CHELSEA"	Iku Ryukyuji	Takumi Asada	Kenta Matsukuma	3:19
6.	"nerve"	Yoji Kubota	mifuu	Schtein&Longer	4:29
7.	"Our Song"	Akihiro Namba	Shinichi Osawa	Schtein&Longer	5:42
8.	"My Ixxx"	BiS	Kenta Matsukuma	Kenta Matsukuma	3:43
9.	"I wish I was SpecIaL"	JxSxK	Ichirou Iguchi	Ichirou Iguchi	2:24
10.	"hitoribochi"	BiS	mifuu	Hidetoshi Miyai	4:55
11.	"IDOL"	Iku Ryukyuji	Kenta Matsukuma	Kenta Matsukuma	3:44
12.	"urge over kill of love"	Yufu Terashima	Kenta Matsukuma	Kenta Matsukuma	3:17
13.	"primal."	BiS	Kenta Matsukuma	Kenta Matsukuma	4:25

Movie Edition Disc 2: Movie + Live DVD
No.	Title	Length
1.	"IDOL is DEAD -The Movie-" (アイドル・イズ・デッド（映画）)
2.	"Give me your love Zembu" (BiS in MOOSIC LAB Re:KICK OFF PARTY!(LIVE))
3.	"IDOL" (BiS in MOOSIC LAB Re:KICK OFF PARTY!(LIVE))
4.	"BiS" (BiS in MOOSIC LAB Re:KICK OFF PARTY!(LIVE))
5.	"primal." (BiS in MOOSIC LAB Re:KICK OFF PARTY!(LIVE))

MV Edition Disc 2: Music Video DVD
No.	Title	Length
1.	"BiS"
2.	"Paprika" (パプリカ)
3.	"nerve"
4.	"My Ixxx"
5.	"primal."
6.	"Aidoru" (アイドル (Idol))
7.	"IDOL"
8.	"PPCC"
9.	"IDOL is DEAD"

== Personnel ==
- BiS - Lyrics on Tracks 2, 3, 8, 10 and 13
  - Pour Lui – vocals
  - Nozomi Hirano – vocals
  - Yufu Terashima – vocals; Lyrics on Track 12
  - Rio Michibayashi – vocals; Lyrics on Track 4
  - Yurika Wakisaka – vocals
- Kenta Matsukuma – Sound producer; all instruments
- Takumi Asada – Guitar and Bass guitar on Track 5
- Sho Sakafumi – Guitar on Track 5
- Satoshi Aoki – Guitar on Track 6
- Keita Kitajima – Bass guitar on Tracks 3 and 9
- megane – Bass guitar on Track 11
- Takashi Todoroki – Drums on Tracks 3, 4, 5, 8 and 13
- Takuya Kusunose – Drums on Tracks 9 and 10
- Studio-Novel – Art Direction and Design
- Katsuto Matsuura – executive producer
- Hikaru Yamaguchi – executive producer

== Notes ==
- All writing, arrangement and personnel credits taken from the album insert.
