= Re:Stupid =

Studio album by Bis
- Released: February 22, 2017
- Genre: Pop punk; dance-punk; alternative metal
- Length: 39:02
- Language: Japanese, English
- Label: Tsubasa Records
- Producer: Kenta Matsukuma, JxSxK

Bis chronology
Brand-new idol Society 2 (2016)	Re:Stupid (2017)	Brand-new idol Society (2019)

Re:Stupid (stylized as Re:STUPiD) is the fifth album by Japanese idol group Bis. It consists of ten tracks and was released through the independent label Tsubasa Records on February 22, 2017. It is the second album released by the group after their reformation in 2016, and is the first album to feature the same line-up as the previous album.

== Track listing ==
All music is composed by Kenta Matsukuma.

No.	Title	Lyrics	Length
1.	"Gives"	Kenta Matsukuma	4:40
2.	"Twisted Grunge"	Go Zeela	4:01
3.	"Mystery Asshole" (ミステリアスホール)	Iku Ryukyuji	3:16
4.	"Say Yes"	Go Zeela	3:19
5.	"Never Starting Song"	Go Zeela	3:34
6.	"Not the End"	Pour Lui	4:09
7.	"Give Me a Chocolate" (ぎぶみあちょこれいと)	Peri Ubu	4:05
8.	"Romeo no Shinzō" (ロミオの心臓)	Pour Lui	3:35
9.	"Ashita ga Kuru Nara" (明日が来るなら)	Kika Front Frontale	3:44
10.	"Nakodub"	JxSxK	4:34

== Personnel ==
Bis

- Pour Lui – vocals; lyrics on Tracks 6 and 8
- Aya Eightprince – vocals
- Peri Ubu – vocals, lyrics on Track 7
- Kika Front Frontalle – vocals, lyrics on Track 9
- Go Zeela – vocals, lyrics on Tracks 2, 4 and 5

== Charts ==
Chart performance for Our Parade
Chart	Peak position
Japanese Albums (Oricon)	25

== Notes ==
- All writing, arrangement and personnel credits taken from the album insert.
