= In Case of Fire =

Irish alternative rock band

- In Case of Fire perform at the 2009 Leeds Festival. L-R: Steven Robinson, Colin Robinson, Mark Williamson

Background information
- Origin: Portadown, Northern Ireland
- Genres: Alternative rock, progressive rock, new prog, post-hardcore
- Years active: 2005–2012, 2016–present
- Labels: Search and Destroy, Zomba
- Members: Steven Robinson; Colin Robinson; Adam Booth
- Past members: Mark Williamson; Thomas Camblin; Craig Skene

In Case of Fire are an alternative rock band from Portadown, Northern Ireland, who formed in 2005. The band officially disbanded in October 2012, and then reunited in March 2016. The original line-up consisted of lead vocalist and guitarist Steven Robinson, bassist Mark Williamson and drummer Colin Robinson. Their musical style has been described as "alternative rock" with "progressive" and "hardcore" influence, and they have been compared to Muse, Queens of the Stone Age and Mars Volta. Critics have specifically praised the band's use of unusual time signatures. They were signed to Search and Destroy Records in the UK and the Zomba Label Group in the United States but are now independent.

The trio won the MTV2 'Spanking New' competition, coming out on top of such acts as Adele, Foals, Black Kids and Lykke Li to be the "viewer's choice of bands to watch out for in 2008". They were the opening act on the 2009 Kerrang! tour supporting Bring Me the Horizon, Black Tide, Dir En Grey and Mindless Self Indulgence, after receiving high praise from editor Paul Brannigan. He had said that the three-piece were "the best new band I’ve heard in ages". On 28 March 2009, the band supported Fightstar and Bullet for My Valentine at the Royal Albert Hall, in London for a special Teenage Cancer Trust show, after replacing The Blackout due to illness.

The band released their debut album, Align the Planets in May 2009 which received strong reviews from the alternative music press. Later, in August 2009 they won the Kerrang! Award for "Best British Newcomer".

== Second album and disbandment (2010–2012) ==
At the end of April 2010, the band advertised an 'early album version' of "Burn the Bridges" on bandcamp. Their latest single, "Are You Ready?", and its b-side, is available as a free download at their bandcamp site.

The band announced via Facebook on 1 March that they had split from Raw Power Management, following several failed attempts to get the recording of a second album off the ground in the last year and a half, which had led the band to question its own existence. In the following month, demos of new songs "Pretender" and "The Reason" were placed on the band's Facebook page. In April 2011 it was announced via Facebook that bassist Mark Williamson had left the band and was soon replaced by touring member Craig Skene, who also provided backing vocals. The following November, it was announced that Colin Robinson had also left the band. Thomas Camblin then joined the band as a touring drummer. The band continued to play shows and festivals over the course of the next year until in October 2012, when lead vocalist/guitarist Steven posted a statement on the band's Facebook page.

"I've loved every second of being in ICOF. It's been an amazing 7 years, but the time feels right to bring it to an end. Thanks so much to every single person that bought/downloaded our music, came to a gig and spread the word about our band - it was because of you that we got to do what we love and for that I am truly thankful. I'll take the time in the next while to put up a proper blog post about everything ICOF, but I'll keep this short for now. Thanks to Col, Mark, Thomas and Craig for everything. So, thanks again guys and I might see you all at a gig if I ever pick up the guitar again. Steve"

== Reunion show and new music (2016–present) ==
In May 2016, the band posted a statement on their Facebook page. "ICOF have indeed returned. Colin is back in the band alongside Steve, and Adam Booth is taking over from Mark who couldn’t return due to other commitments. We’ve made a conscious decision to make ICOF active once again, to play shows and write/record when we can and when we want. If we have new music for you, we’ll share it. We’re in control of the band again so when we’re doing something, you know it’s because we want to do it, and we want you all involved"

The band later played a show on 20 April 2016 at the Limelight in Belfast where the debut album 'Align The Planets' was played in its entirety.

In November 2020, Steve posted on the band's Facebook page a demo of a new song called "Juggernaut" which was made available to stream for free on SoundCloud. In February 2021, the band posted another new demo titled "Ghosts" which was made available to download for free on Bandcamp. Towards the end of March 2021, the band posted short versions of more new demos titled "The Deep" and "Offering" which were also made available to stream for free on SoundCloud.

At the end of November 2023, bassist Adam Booth posted the following via his Instagram account. "It's been a long, long time coming, but some exciting things are happening with @incaseoffireuk in 2024. It's gonna blow your socks off. See you in the pit".

At the beginning of March 2024, the band announced via Facebook that a new song titled "Prisoner" would be released on 22 March, making it their first single in over a decade. The band soon followed up by posting "We've been away for a long time. It feels really good to be back but it feels even better to know that there are people out there who still feel connected to our band. That means everything to us. We hope you're as excited as we are to release new music and play some shows".

Towards the end of March 2024, the band announced via Facebook that they would be playing their first live show in 8 years on the 27th June 2024 at The Union Bar in Belfast.

At the end of May 2024, the band released another new single titled "Rescue Me" which was made available to stream online.

Around the beginning of August 2024, the band announced via social media that they would be playing a headlining show at the Belfast Empire on 17 October 2024.

== Members ==
- Steven Robinson – lead vocals, guitars, lyrics (2005–2012, 2016–present)
- Adam Booth – bass guitar, (2016–present)
- Colin Robinson – drums, percussion (2005–2011, 2016–present)

== Touring members ==
- Thomas Camblin – drums, percussion (2011–2012)
- Craig Skene - bass guitar, backing vocals (2011–2012)

== Past members ==
- Mark Williamson - bass guitar (2005–2011)

== Discography ==
=== Studio albums ===
- Align the Planets (2009)
- The Barrier Between Us And God (2010)

=== Singles ===
Year	Title	Chart Positions			Album
Year	Title	UK Singles Chart	UK Rock Chart	UK Indie Chart	Album
2008	"This Time We Stand"	–	–	–	Align the Planets
2009	"The Cleansing"	–	–	10	Align the Planets
2009	"Enemies"	–	–	–	Align the Planets
2009	"Parallels"	–	–	–	Align the Planets
2009	"The Cleansing" (re-release)	–	–	–	Align the Planets
2010	"Are You Ready?"	–	–	–	
2012	"Pretender"	–	–	–	
2024	"Prisoner"	_	_	_	
2024	"Rescue Me"	_	_	_	

== Awards ==
Year	Title	Award	Nominated work	Result
2009	Kerrang! Awards	Best British Newcomer	In Case of Fire	Won
