= Lookie =

Studio album by Bis
- Released: February 5, 2020
- Genre: Pop-punk; dance-punk
- Length: 51:21
- Language: Japanese
- Label: Nippon Crown

Bis chronology
Brand-new idol Society (2019)	Lookie (2020)	Never Mind (2024)

Lookie is the seventh studio album from Japanese girl group Bis. It was released on February 5, 2020, by Nippon Crown and consists of thirteen tracks.

== Track listing ==
Lookie track listing
No.	Title	Lyrics	Music	Length
1.	"Stupid (New Type Ver.)"	Kenta Matsukuma, JxSxK	Kenta Matsukuma	4:03
2.	"Bis - Dōyara Zombie no o Demashi (New Type Ver.)" (Bis-どうやらゾンビのおでまし- (New Type Ver.))	Kenta Matsukuma, JxSxK	Kenta Matsukuma	5:02
3.	"Surrender (New Type Ver.)"	Kenta Matsukuma, JxSxK	Kenta Matsukuma	4:10
4.	"Trap"	Jiiku Ryugu	Kenta Matsukuma	3:27
5.	"Kiss My Ass"	Kenta Matsukuma, JxSxK	Kenta Matsukuma	3:07
6.	"Lovely Lovely"	Junzo Osawa	Kenta Matsukuma	3:55
7.	"Basket Box"	JxSxK	Kenta Matsukuma	4:05
8.	"Laugh At Me"	Kenta Matsukuma, JxSxK	Kenta Matsukuma	4:48
9.	"Fucking Out"	Toggy, JxSxK	Oni	4:02
10.	"Telephone" (テレフォン)	Neo Trees	Kenta Matsukuma	3:34
11.	"For Me"	Kenta Matsukuma, JxSxK	Kenta Matsukuma	3:29
12.	"Spilled Milk"	JxSxK	Satoshi Toyosumi	3:48
13.	"Fool Proof"	Kenta Matsukuma, JxSxK	Kenta Matsukuma	3:43
Total length:				51:21

== Charts ==
Chart performance for Lookie
Chart	Peak position
Japanese Albums (Oricon)	6
Japanese Hot Albums (Billboard Japan)	8
