= Akishibu Project =

Japanese idol group

Akishibu Project アキシブproject
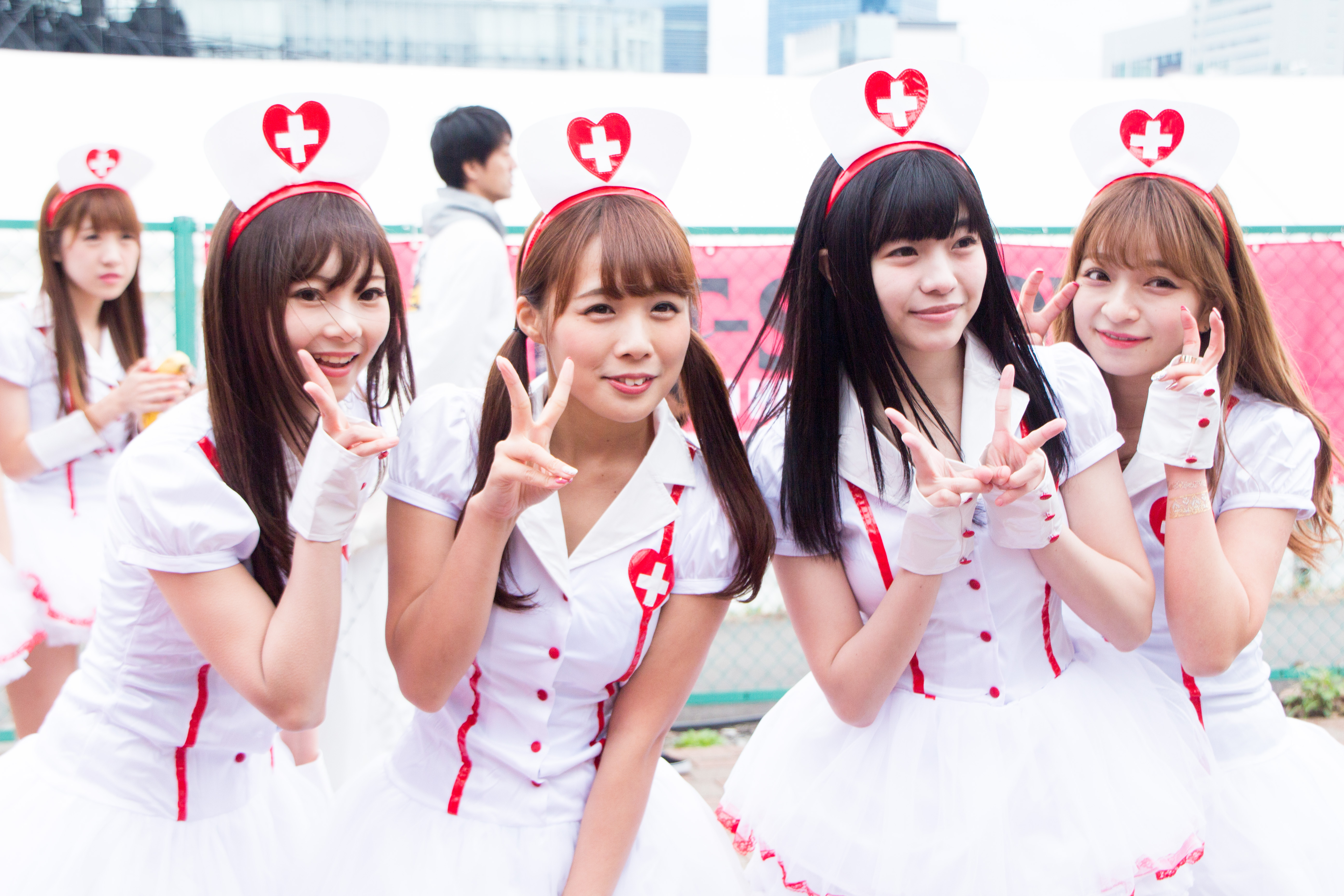
- T-SPOOK 2016

Background information
- Origin: Japan
- Genres: J-pop; pop
- Years active: 2012–present
- Labels: Twin Planet Entertainment (2012-2017); KING RECORDS (2018-present)
- Members: Fuu Aoi; Nana Kisaragi; Run Kiyomi; Rana Matsui; Manami Mikoto; Hotaru Amakawa; Arisa Yumesaki
- Past members: Rina Yokoyama; Ami Iseki; Emiri Otani; Emiri Suzuki; Rena Hayashi; Miki Fujimoto; Kaori Miyako; Sara Murayama; Saori Funaki; Yuuna Arakawa; Natsumi Ishikawa; Yurina Kato; Saori Funaki; Yuringo; Mahiro Hoshino; Hinako Kera; Yue Miyatani Kanon Morishita; Serina Kanno; Mahiro Hoshino; Ruka Okonogi; Mizuki Tsushiro; Riho Mashiro; Rino Fukuyama
- Website: akishibup.net

Akishibu Project (アキシブproject) is a Japanese idol girl group. They aim to "bring the cultures of Shibuya and Akihabara together". The group was formed by a former member of BiS and there are currently eight active members. The group performs regularly at TwinBoxAkihabara, in addition to performing live concerts in and outside of Japan. The group performed in Thailand at Japan Expo 2016. Their single "Summer☆Summer/セツナツリ" reached the 9th place on the Weekly Oricon Singles Chart.

They are now under the combined group HEROINES.

== History ==
=== 2012: Formation and debut ===
Akishibu Project was formed in the late 2012, and debuted officially with Thirteen members on May 24, 2013. However, the group's full scale start up begins in March 2014.

=== 2018: Auditions and major debut ===
Auditions were held in early 2018 to find members to join the group prior to their major debut. Out of over 1,200 applicants, 21 were chosen to participate in the second round of auditions on SHOWROOM Live, a live-streaming website. Four girls were chosen from the 21 as new members. During their stage debut, Akishibu Project announced their major debut single, "Hola! Hola! Summer", would be released on August 15, 2018.

== Members ==
=== Current members ===
Update: July 2018.

Name	Nickname	Birthdate	Age	Member color*	Twitter	Instagram	Notes
Hinako Kera	Hinahi	November 5, 1992	34	Orange	@aksb_kera	@kerahinako1105	
Yue Miyatani	Yuechi	July 20, 1995	31	Red	@aksb_miyatani	@yue_miyatani	Leader
Miiro Taguchi	Miichan	June 26, 1997	29	Pink	@aksb_taguchi	@miiro_taguchi	
Mahiro Hoshino	Honi	March 8, 1996	30	Blue	@aksb_honii	@mhr_honi	
Ruka Okonogi	Ruururu	April 16, 1998	28	Silver※White	@aksb_ruka	@okonogi_ruka	
Mizuki Tsushiro	Tsushiro	October 16, 2000	26	Emerald Green	@aksb_mizuki	@__tsushiromizuki	
Fukuyama Rino	Rinomaru	December 24, 1997	28	Light Blue	@aksb_rino	@rinomaru_	
Kanno Serina		January 7, 1999	27	Light Green	@aksb_serina	@serina_kanno	
Mashiro Riho	Rittan	December 20, 1999	26	Purple	@aksb_masiro	@mashiro_riho	
Morishita Kanon	Nonchan	June 29, 2001	25	Yellow	@aksb_kanon	@morisita_kanon	

* All colour values are approximate.

=== 1st Generation Members ===
- Rina Yokoyama (October 2012 – May 11, 2014)
- Hinako Kera
- Yue Miyatani
- Yuuna Arakawa
- Ishikawa Natsumi
- Ami Iseki
- Emiri Otani
- Emiri Suzuki
- Miiro Taguchi
- Rena Hayashi
- Miki Fujimoto
- Saori Funaki
- Kaori Miyako
- Sara Murayama

== Timeline ==
Note(s):

- On February 4, 2018, 4 members changed their member colors:
  - Miyatani Yue ( Yellow → Red ), Okonogi Ruka ( Silver → White ), Yuringo ( Turquoise Blue → Purple )

== Discography ==
=== Albums ===
Release date	Title	Oricon (Note: Peak ranking on the weekly Oricon Albums Chart.)	Ref.
April 14, 2015	乱れ髪ファイティングガール	29	
February 23, 2016	New World	56	

=== Singles ===
Release date	Title	Oricon (Note: Peak ranking on the weekly Oricon Singles Chart.)	Ref.
August 9, 2016	"Summer☆Summer/セツナツリ"	9	
August 30, 2017	"Abanchu!/Natsu Love"	18	
August 15, 2018	"Hola! Hola! Summer"	9	
August 28, 2019	"The First Summer"	14	
