= Billie Idle =

Japanese idol girl group

- Origin: Japan
- Genres: J-pop
- Years active: 2015–2019
- Label: Otsumo Record
- Past members: First Summer Uika; Hirano Nozomi; Momose Momo; Yasui Yuuhi; Akira; Pour Lui

Billie Idle (stylized as BILLIE IDLE®) was a Japanese alternative idol girl group founded in 2015. They debuted on April 1, 2015, with the album, Idle Gossip. They disbanded at the end of 2019.

== History ==
On July 8, 2014, during the disbandment concert of BiS, First Summer Uika and Hirano Nozomi announced their plans to form a new group and intention to hold auditions. In January 2015 Momose Momo and Yasui Yuuhi joined the group. The group made their debut as Billie Idle in March 2015, with the releases of "Anarchy in the music scene". Their debut album, Idle Gossip, was released in April, followed by their second album, Rock "N" Roll Idle in September.

In Summer 2016, Yasui Yuuhi quit the group due to health issues, and Momose Momo's sister joined as Akira in September of the same year. In October, their third album, Bi Bi Bi Bi Bi, was released.

In April 2017, the group released a compilation album, Billied Idle, and a live album, Launching Out. Their single "My Way" was released in August. The group's fourth album, Last Album was released in November.

In March 2018, they released "P.S.R.I.P". In May, former BiS member Pour Lui was announced to be joining as a new member from June 6, 2018. The group's second compilation album, Billied Idle 2.0, was released in July. Their fifth album, Not Idol, was released in November.

In February 2019, the group released the single, "Soshite, mata..", followed by "Bokura Mada Chippoke na Koro no Hanashi" in May, and finally "Last Orgy" in October. That same month, it was announced that the group would dissolve in December after their one-man tour titled "Billie Idle Tour Last Orgy". According to their producer Nigo, the reason for their disbandment were difficulties within the company and insufficient commercial success. Billie Idle's last performance on December 28 was broadcast live on AbemaTV.

== Members ==
- First Summer Uika (2015–2019)
- Hirano Nozomi (2015–2019)
- Momose Momo (2015–2019)
- Yasui Yuuhi (2015–2016)
- Akira (2016–2019)
- Pour Lui (2018–2019)

== Discography ==
Billie Idle discography
- Studio albums: 5
- Live albums: 1
- Compilation albums: 2
- Singles: 5

=== Studio albums ===
Title	Album details	Peak positions	
Title	Album details	JPN	
Title	Album details	Oricon	Billboard
Idle Gossip	Released: April 1, 2015; Label: Otsumo Record; Formats: CD, digital download	118	—
Rock "N" Roll Idle	Released: September 16, 2015; Label: Otsumo Record; Formats: CD, digital download	96	—
Bi Bi Bi Bi Bi	Released: October 26, 2016; Label: Otsumo Record; Formats: CD, digital download	113	—
Last Album	Released: November 22, 2017; Label: Otsumo Record; Formats: CD, digital download	40	52
Not Idol	Released: November 7, 2018; Label: Otsumo Record; Formats: CD, digital download	12	14
"—" denotes a recording that did not chart or was not released in that territory.

=== Compilation albums ===
Title	Album details	Peak positions	
Title	Album details	JPN	
Title	Album details	Oricon	Billboard
Billied Idle	Released: April 26, 2017; Label: Otsumo Record; Formats: CD, digital download	183	—
Billied Idle 2.0	Released: July 4, 2018; Label: Otsumo Record; Formats: CD, digital download	20	30
"—" denotes a recording that did not chart or was not released in that territory.

=== Live albums ===
Title	Album details	Peak positions
Title	Album details	JPN
Title	Album details	Oricon
Launching Out	Released: April 26, 2017; Label: Otsumo Record; Formats: CD, digital download	237

=== Singles ===
Title	Year	Peak chart positions		Album
Title	Year	JPN		Album
Title	Year	Oricon	Billboard	Album
"My Way"	2017	25	—	Last Album
"P.S.R.I.P"	2018	29	—	Billied Idle 2.0
"Soshite, mata.." (そして、また、、)	2019	8	19	Non-album singles
"Bokura Mada Chippoke na Koro no Hanashi" (僕らまだちっぽけな頃の話)	2019	3	27	Non-album singles
"Last Orgy"	2019	9	34	Non-album singles
"—" denotes a recording that did not chart or was not released in that territory.
