= Are You Ready? (Bis song) =

Single by Bis
- B-side: "Bisbis"
- Released: March 20, 2019
- Genre: J-pop, rock
- Length: 31:35
- Label: Nippon Crown

Bis singles chronology
"Against the Pain" (2018)	"Are You Ready?" (2019)

Music video
- "Are You Ready?" on YouTube

"Are You Ready?" is the sixth and final single by the second generation of Japanese girl group Bis, released on March 20, 2019, by Nippon Crown. The single peaked at number two on the Oricon Singles Chart. "Are You Ready?" serves as the fifth ending theme of Yu-Gi-Oh! VRAINS.

== Music and lyrics ==
The song "Are You Ready?" was inspired by the film Bohemian Rhapsody and has a length of 11 minutes and 24 seconds which is a reference to November 24, the date of Freddie Mercury's death.

== Track listing ==
All music by Matsukuma Kenta.

CD single
No.	Title	Lyrics	Length
1.	"Are you ready?"	Matsukuma Kenta, JxSxK	11:24
2.	"Bisbis"	Pour Lui, JxSxK	4:22
3.	"Are you ready? (Instrumental)"		11:24
4.	"Bisbis (Instrumental)"		4:22
Total length:			31:35

== Charts ==
Weekly chart performance for "Are You Ready?"
Chart (2019)	Peak position
Japan (Japan Hot 100)	8
Japan (Oricon)	2

== Certifications ==
Certifications and sales for "Are You Ready?"
Region	Certification	Certified units/sales
Japan (RIAJ)	Gold	100,000^{^}
^{^} Shipments figures based on certification alone.
