= Align the Planets =

Studio album by In Case of Fire
- Released: 11 May 2009
- Recorded: April–May 2008 at Rockfield Studios, Monmouth, Wales; and Miloco Studios, London, England
- Genre: Progressive rock, alternative rock, new prog, post-hardcore
- Length: 43:39
- Label: Search and Destroy
- Producer: Gil Norton

Singles from Align the Planets
- 1. "This Time We Stand" Released: 11 November 2008; 2. "The Cleansing" Released: 2 March 2009; 3. "Enemies" Released: 4 May 2009; 4. "Parallels" Released: 24 August 2009

Professional ratings
Review scores
Source	Rating
Big Cheese	5/5 stars
In the News	(7/10)
Kerrang!	4/5 stars
Q	4/5 stars
Rock Sound	(7/10)
Total Guitar	4/5 stars
Uncut	4/5 stars
NME	4/10 stars

Align the Planets is the debut studio album by Northern Irish alternative rock trio In Case of Fire, released 11 May 2009 on Search and Destroy Records.

Recorded at Rockfield Studios in Wales, the album had originally been recorded in their home town of Portadown over a seven-month period but was re-recorded after signing a record deal.

The trio say about the album that, "We're just a rock band that write about things that are important to us". Social issues, child abuse and war are the main topics the band tackle on the album along with personal problems, such as the death of Colin and Steven's father at an early age.

== Promotion ==
The trio's debut single "This Time We Stand" was released 11 November 2008 along with a music video. The single was played frequently on MTV2. The video for second single "The Cleansing" was shot in Leeds and was then released along with a limited edition 7" vinyl picture disc on 2 March 2009. It went on to chart at #10 in the UK Indie Chart.

"Enemies" was the third single released a week prior to the album on 4 May 2009. The video was directed by Canadian visual artist, Jesse Ewles.

A demo of "Violence and Pictures" was also featured on the "New Breed" compilation CD by Kerrang! and the band started touring in order to promote the album on 12 May at the Exeter Cavern.

Fourth single, "Parallels" was released on 24 August 2009, preceding their performances at the Reading and Leeds Festivals on the August Bank Holiday weekend. The music video was made available on their Myspace on the release date. Second single, "The Cleansing" was re-released on 26 October 2009, featuring two new exclusive b-sides.

== Track listing ==
All lyrics written by Steven Robinson, music composed by in Case of Fire.

1. "This Time We Stand" – 3:34
2. "The Cleansing" – 3:34
3. "Do What I Say" – 3:56
4. "Align The Planets" – 4:05
5. "Parallels" – 3:32
6. "Plan A" – 4:18
  - samples narration by Martin Luther King Jr.
7. "Enemies" – 2:49
8. "Landslides" – 3:34
9. "Violence and Pictures" – 2:50
10. "And Sorrow" – 3:07
11. "A Pale New Costume" – 4:07
12. "Second Revelation" – 4:03

=== Bonus tracks ===
Play.com Bonus Tracks

13. "The Cleansing" (Live Acoustic)
14. "Landslides" (Live Acoustic)
15. "Hold My Head Up High" (Live Acoustic)

=== B-sides ===
"This Time We Stand"

- "Call To Arms"
- "This Time We Stand" (Live)
- "This Time We Stand" (Acoustic)

"The Cleansing"

- "Faust"
- "A Terrible Fate"
- "The Cleansing" (Live)

"Enemies"

- "History Has Taught Us Nothing"
- "Hold My Head Up High (Acoustic)"

"Parallels"

- "Align The Planets" (Live)
- "Plan A" (Live)

== Personnel ==
The following personnel contributed to Align the Planets:

=== In Case of Fire ===
- Steve Robinson – lead vocals, guitars, lyrics
- Colin Robinson – drums, percussion
- Mark Williamson – bass guitar, backing vocals

=== Additional musicians ===
- Rocky O'Reilly – programming (tracks 2, 6, 8, 10, 11, 12)
- Audrey Riley – cello (track 5)

=== Production ===
- Gil Norton – producer
- Chris Sheldon – mixing
- Guy Massey – engineering
- Ted Jensen – mastering
- John Dunne – Pro Tools, engineering assistant
- Jeff Gilligan – art direction, design
- Paul Harries – photography
- Craig Jennings – A&R
