= The Cleansing (song) =

Single by In Case of Fire

from the album Align the Planets
- B-side: "Faust"; "A Terrible Fate"
- Released: 2 March 2009 (UK); 26 October 2009 (re-release)
- Recorded: 2009
- Genre: Alternative rock Progressive rock
- Length: 5:36 (CD); 11:55 (Digital download)
- Songwriter(s): In Case of Fire
- Producer(s): Gil Norton

In Case of Fire singles chronology
"This Time We Stand" (2008)	"The Cleansing" (2009)	"Enemies" (2009)

"The Cleansing" is the second single by In Case of Fire, and is the only In Case of Fire song that has entered a radio chart to date. "The Cleansing" was also made available on a 7" vinyl picture disk, limited to 1000 copies. The music video was shot in Leeds.

The Cleansing will be re-released on 26 October with 2 new exclusive b-sides.

== Track listing ==
CD:

1. The Cleansing – 3:34
2. Faust – 2:02

Digital download:

1. The Cleansing – 3:34
2. The Cleansing (Live Session 4/12/08)
3. Faust – 2:02
4. A Terrible Fate – 2:49

== Chart performance ==
Chart	Peak position
UK Indie Chart	10

== Personnel ==
- Steven Robinson – Vocals, Guitar
- Mark Williamson – Bass guitar
- Colin Robinson – Drums, Percussion
