= Are You Ready? (In Case of Fire song) =

Single by In Case of Fire
- B-side: "What Are We Fighting For?"
- Released: June 7, 2010
- Recorded: 2009, at Start Together Studios, Belfast, Northern Ireland.
- Genre: Alternative rock Progressive rock
- Length: 7:32
- Songwriter(s): In Case of Fire
- Producer(s): Rocky O' Reilly; In Case of Fire

In Case of Fire singles chronology
"Parallels" (2009)	"Are You Ready?" (2010)

"Are You Ready?" is the first single from the second album by In Case of Fire. The song was released June 7, 2010 on their bandcamp-site, for a free download. The single gained airplay on Radio 1, in both Nick Grimshaw and Zane Lowe's shows. No music video was planned for the single.

== Track listing ==
1. "Are You Ready?" – 3:32
2. "What Are We Fighting For?" – 4:00

== Personnel ==
- Steven Robinson – Vocals, Guitar
- Mark Williamson – Bass guitar
- Colin Robinson – Drums, Percussion
