= Bis Kaidan =

Japanese noise band

BiS Kaidan
- Also known as: BiS階段
- Origin: Japan
- Genres: Noise rock
- Years active: 2012–2014
- Label: Avex Trax
- Spinoffs: BiS, Hijokaidan, Bish
- Members: Pour Lui; Nozomi Hirano; Saki Kamiya; Tentenko; First Summer Uika; Megumi Koshouji; Jojo Hiroshige; Toshiji Mikawa; Junko

Bis Kaidan (BiS階段, stylized as BiS Kaidan) was a Japanese noise rock band formed in 2012 as a collaboration between the female idol group Bis (a name which stands for "Brand-new idol Society") and the noise band Hijokaidan.

== History ==
Bis Kaidan was a project launched by Hijokaidan's frontman Jojo Hiroshige. Initially he expressed a desire to work with idol group Momoiro Clover Z to create "Momoclo Kaidan," but fans on Twitter suggested that Bis, a group known for their punk rock sound and extreme stunts, would fit Hijokaidan's image better.

They initially worked together as what was to be a one-off unit in November 2012, where they performed live noise renditions of Bis' songs "eat it" and "nerve". However, Hiroshige was interested in taking the project further, and so requested to release something with the group. In doing so, they became the first and only noise band on Bis' label Avex Trax, the biggest major record label in Japan. In 2013, they then released a self-titled album which includes a cover of Jun Togawa's hit song "Suki Suki Daisuki". They are billed as the world's first idol noise band.

They released a music video for their "Suki Suki Daisuki" cover on the 30th of June, which features homages to other noise and punk groups such as Hanatarash and The Stalin.

In May 2014, the group held their final concert as Bis Kaidan before disbanding, much as Bis themselves will disband in July. Notably, their final show began with the group performing "nerve", their representative song, thirteen times in a row.

== Members ==
The Bis members currently involved in this project are leader Pour Lui, Saki Kamiya, First Summer Uika, Ten Tenko, Nozomi Hirano, and Megumi Koshouji, who is their newest member after joining the group in early November. Hijokaidan's members are Jojo Hiroshige, Junko, and Toshiji Mikawa, who also performs in Incapacitants.

Former members of Bis Yurika Wakisaka, Rio Michibayashi, and Yufu Terashima also performed as Bis Kaidan, but have now left the group. Due to the way in which their album was created (Hijokaidan adding noise to remixed Bis songs), it also features the voice of Yukiko Nakayama on "eat it", who graduated from Bis in late 2011, before the Bis Kaidan collaboration ever took place.

== Recordings ==
Their self-titled first album was initially released on vinyl in June 2013 on the Jet Set label. A CD version followed in early August on Avex Trax. The sound of the vinyl release is mixed with 40% more noise than the CD version, and so included a download card with a link to download MP3 versions of the mixes included on the record. Both releases included one of ten trading cards featuring either a member of Bis or of Hijokaidan, and one photo with a group shot. As well as their Jun Togawa cover, the album includes five reworked Bis songs and "Bis_kaidan," a harsh noise collage. The latter song is original to this project, but the Bis vocals are those from their March 2013 single "BiSimulation" played in reverse. In May 2014, a version of the LP, featuring alternate cover art, all the songs on one side and a laser etching on the other side was released by the French label Specific in an edition of 500 copies. It is sold out, but the music is available for streaming and download on Specific's Bandcamp page.

A self-titled box set limited to 1000 copies and priced at ¥30,000 was announced in Japan and offered for pre-order, and it sold out before its September 3, 2014 release date. It contains four CDs (the second self-titled album, the LP mix of the first album, Best Live Select and vocal and instrumental versions of the 30-minute piece "BiS_kaidan_3"), four DVDs and two Blu-ray discs featuring 11 live shows by the band (including collaborations with Tokyo Shock Boys, Soul Flower Union and the Genbaku Onanies, plus a Jazz Bis Kaidan performance), a photo book, a Last Official T-shirt (size M), and a piece of the sailor suit worn by a group member. The second album was also released separately on the same date as a "discount edition" CD with a DVD of the final performance on May 6, 2014, and is still available. The Specific label licensed the second album in 2015, also for release on 500 one-sided laser-etched LPs as well as streaming and download on their Bandcamp page and retitled BiS Kaidan 2. Also on September 3, 2014, Jojo's Alchemy Records label released the recording of the last gig as a double CD; the first disc consists of the 13 performances of "nerve" that opened the show.

== Performance ==
Like many other noise groups, Bis Kaidan's performances were noted for being chaotic and destructive. At a live performance at Shibuya WWW in August, they threw objects including chicken feet, buckets, their own underwear, and a pig's severed head into the crowd.

In September 2013, they performed with shock artists Tokyo Shock Boys, known in Japan as "Dengeki Network," using the name Dengeki Bis Kaidan (電撃BiS階段). Here, they expanded on their usual performance by adding various stunts, including Tokyo Shock Boys vacuum-packing Toshiji Mikawa and Ten Tenko into a plastic bag.

Bis Kaidan has also performed concerts in collaboration with other bands, including Soul Flower Union (as Soul Flower Bis Kaidan) and punk band The Genbaku Onanies (as Genbaku Bis Kaidan, with Genbaku Onanies playing the accompaniments live.)

Bis members First Summer Uika and Nozomi Hirano have also performed as members of Hijokaidan, with Uika playing drums and Hirano playing electronics in the same role as Mikawa. In April 2014, they performed as Jazz Bis Kaidan, a unit made up of Hijokaidan's side project Jazz Hijokaidan (which combines noise with free jazz) and Bis members Uika and Nozomi. Meanwhile, since their initial work with Bis Kaidan, Jojo Hiroshige and Uika have worked as a collaborative unit together at various concerts. This blurs the line that separates the concepts of idols and artists, which is normally more defined in Japanese society.

== Discography ==
=== Studio albums ===
Title	Album details	Peak positions	
Title	Album details	JPN Oricon	JPN Billboard
BiS Kaidan (BiS階段)	Released: August 07, 2013; Label: Avex Trax; Formats: CD, vinyl, digital download	37	33
2nd Album	Released: December 12, 2014; Label: Avex Trax; Formats: CD, digital download	—	—
"—" denotes a recording that did not chart or was not released in that territory.

=== Live albums ===
Title	Album details
2014.5.6 BiSKaidan Last Gig @ WWW (2014.5.6 BiS階段LAST GIG @ WWW)	Released: September 03, 2014; Label: Avex Trax; Formats: 2CD

=== Video albums ===
Title	Album details	Peak positions
Title	Album details	JPN Oricon
BiS Kaidan (BiS階段)	Released: September 03, 2014; Label: Avex Trax; Formats: DVD+CD, 4DVD+2Blu-ray+4CD	57
