= Never Mind (Bis album) =

Studio album by Bis
- Released: February 28, 2024
- Genre: Pop punk; dance-punk
- Length: 41:02
- Language: Japanese
- Label: Nippon Crown

Bis chronology
Lookie (2020)	Never Mind (2024)

Never Mind is the eighth and final studio album from Japanese girl group Bis. It was released on February 28, 2024, by Nippon Crown and consists of eleven tracks. After the departure of Shion Epic the album was re-recorded and re-released on September 4, 2024, with the title Never Mind (New Type Ver.).

== Track listing ==
Never Mind track listing
No.	Title	Lyrics	Music	Length
1.	"R.U.N"	Eisuke Shimizu	Age Factory
2.	"Still Be Child"	JxSxK	AxSxE
3.	"Olenimorph, Ole"	Abelest	Koji Nakamura, Abelest
4.	"E-R-T-H-C-Na-H-Q-ka-H-K-M-B-Ne-Z-Om" (イーアーティエイチスィーナーエイチキューカーエイチケームビーネーズィーウーオム)	The Spellbound	The Spellbound
5.	"Lazy Dance"	Yutaka Furukawa	Yutaka Furukawa
6.	"Namae o Yonde" (なまえをよんで)	Yutaka Furukawa	Yutaka Furukawa
7.	"Aokaze" (青風)	Abelest	Koji Nakamura, Abelest
8.	"Boku no Me o Mitsumete Kimi no Sekai ni Naritai" (僕の目を見つめて 君の世界になりたい)	The Spellbound	The Spellbound
9.	"Kanashimi o Matō Otoko-tachi no Kōshin" (悲しみを纏う男たちの行進)	谷口健	Foul
10.	"Sakura"	Eisuke Shimizu	Age Factory
11.	"No Choice"	JxSxK	AxSxE
Total length:				41:02

== Charts ==
Chart performance for Lookie
Chart	Peak position
Japanese Albums (Oricon)	6
Japanese Hot Albums (Billboard Japan)	7
