= Brand-new idol Society (2011 album) =

Studio album by BiS
- Released: March 23, 2011
- Genre: Pop punk; dance-punk; alternative metal
- Length: 49:31
- Language: Japanese, English
- Label: Tsubasa Records
- Producer: Kenta Matsukuma, JxSxK

BiS chronology
Brand-new idol Society (2011)	Bisukete (2012)

Singles from Brand-new idol Society
- 1. "Taiyou no Jumon" Released: January 15, 2011; 2. "nerve" Released: October 19, 2011

Brand-new idol Society is the debut album by Japanese idol group BiS released through the independent label Tsubasa Records on March 23, 2011. The album is the first physical release by the group, being preceded by the free digital single "Taiyou no Jumon". It is also the only full album to feature the original lineup, as Rina Yokoyama would leave the group in June 2011.

== Track listing ==
No.	Title	Lyrics	Music	Arranger(s)	Length
1.	"Give me your love Zembu" (Give me your love 全部; "Give me all your love")	Pour Lui	Buzz72+	Buzz72+	3:47
2.	"BiS"	BiS & Dorimi	Kenta Matsukuma	Kenta Matsukuma	4:33
3.	"Taiyou no Jumon" (太陽の呪文; "Cantrip of the Sun")	MID	Kenta Matsukuma	Schtein&Longer	4:08
4.	"nerve"	Yoji Kubota	mifuu	Schtein&Longer	4:29
5.	"Paprika" (パプリカ)	Soyo	Koji Ikuma	Kenta Matsukuma	3:45
6.	"Let me sleep"	megane	megane	megane	2:42
7.	"Thousand Volt" (サウザンボルト)	ryosaku.k	Koichi	Kenta Matsukuma	3:05
8.	"Elegant no Kaibutsu" (エレガントの怪物; "Monster of Elegance")	Naruyoshi Kikuchi	Naruyoshi Kikuchi	Schtein&Longer	4:13
9.	"Teenage Flavor" (ティーネイヂフレイバ)	Iku Ryukyuji	Schtein&Longer	Schtein&Longer	4:21
10.	"Spoon"	Yukiko Nakayama	TKC	TKC+Schtein&Longer	3:00
11.	"YELL!!"	Ichiro Iguchi	Ichiro Iguchi	Ichiro Iguchi	3:50
12.	"One day"	Pour Lui	Kenta Matsukuma	Kenta Matsukuma	3:56
13.	"Let it be" (レリビ)	JxSxK	Honoka Inaba	Ichiro Iguchi	3:47

== Personnel ==
- BiS
  - Pour Lui – vocals; Lyrics on Tracks 1 and 12
  - Nozomi Hirano – vocals
  - Rina Yokoyama – vocals
  - Yukiko Nakayama – vocals; Lyrics on Track 10
- Kenta Matsukuma – Sound producer; Guitar on Tracks 1, 5, 7, 8 and 12; Programming on Tracks 1, 2, 5 and 7
- Ichiro Iguchi – Guitar on Tracks 11 and 13; Programming on Tracks 11 and 13
- Masahiro Inzuka – Guitar on Track 2
- Satoshi Aoki – Guitar on Track 4
- ke-san – Guitar on Track 6
- TKC – Guitar on Tracks 10
- Keita Kitajima – Bass guitar on Track 1
- Tabokun – Bass guitar on Track 2
- megane – Bass guitar on Tracks 6 and 13
- Asahi Yanagihara – Bass guitar on Tracks 11 and 12
- Takashi Todoroki – Drums on Tracks 1, 2, 5, 6, 7, 11 and 12
- Akihiko – Drums on Track 13
- Yuki Yokoyama (Schtein&Longer) – Programming on Tracks 3, 4, 8, 9 and 10
- Shota Kamii – Brass Arrangement on Tracks 3 and 9; Sax on Tracks 3, 8 and 9
- Shun Yonehara – Trumpet on Tracks 3 and 9
- Daisuke Moriwaki – Programming, Strings Arrangement, Violin & Violas on Track 12
- Hikaru Yamaguchi – Executive Producer

== Notes ==
- All writing, arrangement and personnel credits taken from the album insert.
- Track 8, "Elegant no Kaibutsu", is a cover of the song by SPANK HAPPY.
- Track 12, "One day", is a cover of the song by Pour Lui.
- Track 6, "let me sleep", is a song originally performed by Pour Lui during her time as a solo artist. However, this album is the first and only time a recording of the song has been released.
