= Bis (Japanese idol group) =

Japanese idol group

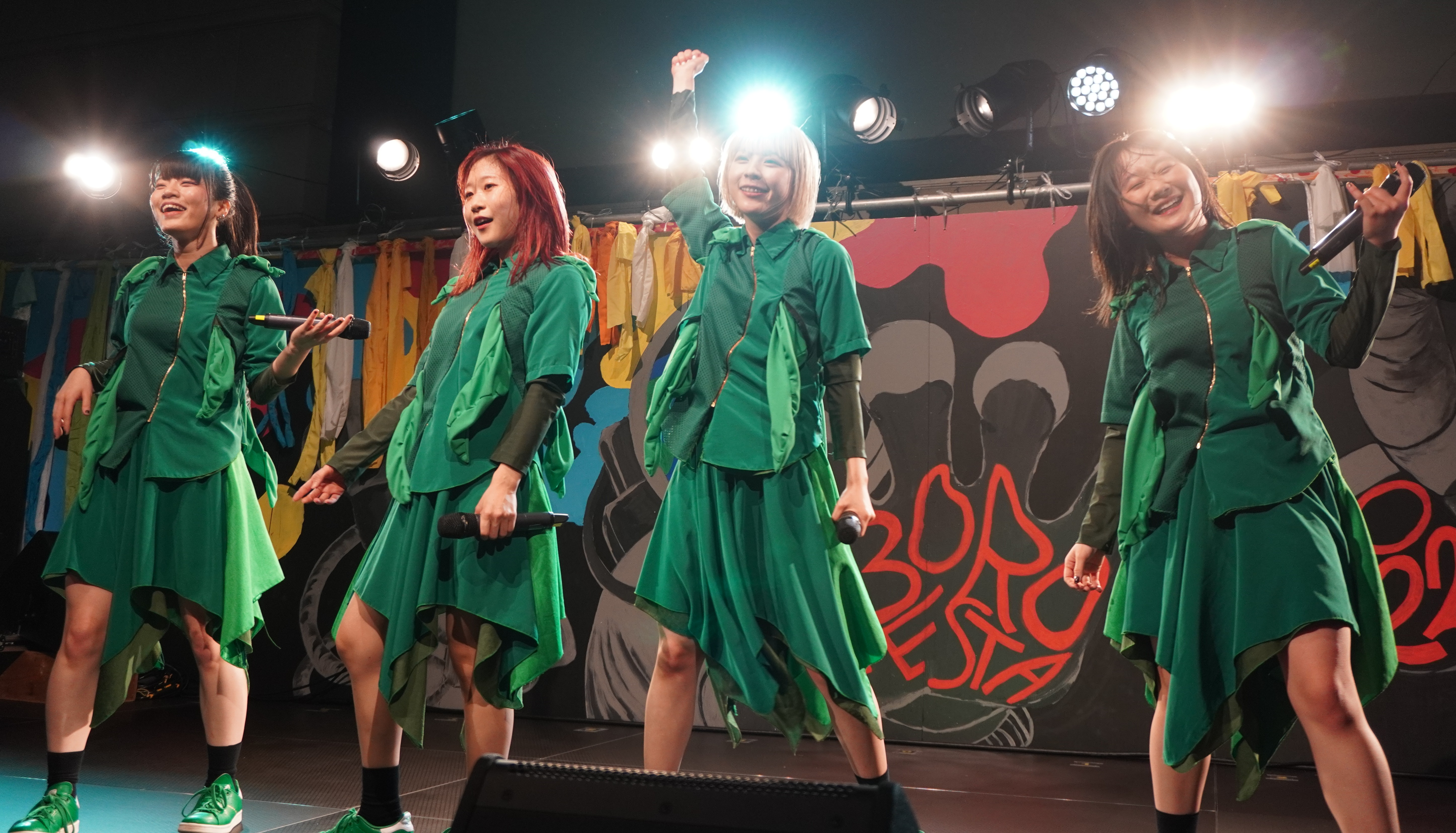
- Bis during live performance in 2022. L-R: Ito Musensiteebu, Toggy, Nano3 and Neo Trees.

Background information
- Also known as: Brand-new idol Society
- Origin: Japan
- Genres: Pop punk; dance-punk; alternative metal
- Years active: 2010–2014, 2016–2019, 2019–2025
- Labels: WACK; Tsubasa Records; Avex Trax; Nippon Crown; Revolver Records
- Spinoffs: Bis Kaidan, Bish
- Past members: See former members
- Website: Official website

Bis (stylized as BiS), also known as Brand-new idol Society (新生アイドル研究会, Shinsei Aidoru Kenkyūkai), was a Japanese alternative idol girl group that was founded in 2010 by leader Pour Lui following a brief solo career. With music, performances and videos that are extremely different from the typical idol group, Bis have come to be known as alternative idols. They disbanded at Yokohama Arena on July 8, 2014.

Exactly two years after their disbandment on July 8, 2016, Pour Lui, Kenta Matsukuma and Junnosuke Watanabe announced that Bis would reform under a new lineup including Pour Lui, and that auditions were going to be held. The second generation of Bis disbanded on May 11, 2019, at the end of their "Are You Ready To Go?" tour.

On the same day as the disbandment of Bis' second generation, Watanabe announced that he would be holding closed auditions for a third generation of Bis, and the new members officially debuted at Tokyo Idol Festival on August 4, 2019. The third generation of Bis disbanded on January 12, 2025.

== History ==
=== First generation ===
==== 2010–2011: Brand-New Idol Society, Formation and debut ====
The formation of Bis came about in late 2010 when Pour Lui, a solo artist known as a "new-age rock icon", announced her intention to retire as a singer and instead form an idol group, for which she would personally audition members. The new four-member group Bis made its debut on the indie record label Tsubasa Records with the free digital single, "Taiyou no Jumon" (太陽のじゅもん). Then, in March 2011, they released the album Brand-new idol Society, which included "Taiyou no Jumon" and a cover of "One day", a song originally by Pour Lui.

==== 2011: My Ixxx, Nerve, Primal. and increasing controversy ====
After the release of Brand-new idol Society, Rina Yokoyama left the group due to a disagreement over the increasingly "un-idol" like direction the group was taking. As a three-member unit, they released the single "My Ixxx", which gained notoriety due to its music video in which the members appear to be completely naked. After this, Yufu Terashima joined the group as a new fourth member. The single "Nerve" (a song originally featured on the Brand-new idol Society album) followed in October. The design of the "Nerve" packaging is censored due to copyright issues, incorporating what is implied to be a spin on the logo of "NERV" as featured in the anime franchise Neon Genesis Evangelion. Their third CD single, "Primal.", an emotional rock song, was released on 21 December. That month, at Bis' solo concert "Idol is Dead", Yukiko Nakayama announced her intention to graduate from the group. Bis responded by releasing the song "Tofu", a free digital download, intended as a diss track for Nakayama.

==== 2012: The Idol stunt ====
2012 saw Bis, a three-member group for the second time, announce a new single, to be titled "Idol" (アイドル (aidoru)) and featuring a change in image. It was advertised with the tagline "Let's buy the same CD over and over again", referring to the marketing technique used by the management of idol groups to encourage fans to purchase several copies of a CD single. Before the single's release, the music video for "Idol" was uploaded to Bis' official YouTube channel and was met with criticism; the once shocking, punk rock Bis were singing a very typical cute idol song, wearing maid outfits and simpering. However, this video (with its deliberate parody of idol groups) was revealed to be a joke at the expense of their fans. It was then made private and a new video for a different song, titled "Idol", was released. "Idol"'s metal-inspired sound was strongly different from the exaggerated cuteness of "Idol". Both songs were eventually released on the HMV-exclusive CD single in April, the group's last release on an indie label.

==== 2012: The Avex era begins, Idol Is Dead ====
Bis were signed to the major label Avex Trax in mid-2012, and auditioned for new members to join the group. This led to the initiation of Yurika Wakisaka and Rio Michibayashi, giving Bis a total of five members. Their first release with Avex was the July single "PPCC" (an acronym standing for the onomatopoeic phrase "pero-pero chu-cchu", meaning "lick-lick kiss-kiss"), and a horror film about and starring the group, titled Idol Is Dead, was released in the same year. The film did not feature Wakisaka or Michibayashi, having been filmed before their debut. October 2012 saw the release of their first major album, Idol Is Dead, which featured seven new songs, "PPCC", a cover of Shinichi Osawa's "Our Song" in a shoegaze style, and re-recordings of several of their tracks as an indie group. It charted at #30 on the Oricon weekly charts, and was their highest-ranking release so far in their career. Around the same time, a short anime series about Bis titled "Backstage idol Story" aired on Space Shower TV.

==== 2013: Major lineup changes, the intention to disband ====
2013's first release by Bis was "Get You", a collaborative effort released with the idol group Dorothy Little Happy. In March came "Bisimulation" and the intention of Yurika Wakisaka to depart from the group due to health issues. Yurika was the center for the single, with a limited-edition version of its CD including a photobook of her and the music video for its B-side "Hide Out Cut" devoted to documenting her time in the group. Yufu Terashima departed soon after, although her split from the group was a less amicable one: Pour Lui openly writes in "BiStory: Who Killed Idol?", her autobiographical account of Bis, that she strongly dislikes Terashima.

Three new members entered the group after this: First Summer Uika, Tentenko, and Saki Kamiya. In June, this lineup of Bis released the single "Die" (featuring a B-side produced by Noriaki Tsuda of Kemuri). It reached number 6 in Oricon's weekly charts, marking Bis' first time in the top ten. As Bis Kaidan, they also released a harsh noise album. The group also appeared in Dempagumi.inc's music video for their song W.W.D II, apart from this, they had joint concerts and a single 'Denden Passion / Idol', this release was only sold at concerts. On August 15, Rio Michibayashi announced her departure from the group. A double A-side single titled "Fly / Hi" was released to commemorate her departure.

==== 2013: A "JK" joins the group, a nationwide tour begins ====
In October, with the nationwide tour "Bis After All" approaching and faced with the departure of Michibayashi, Bis announced that a "JK" would be joining the group as a new member. "JK" is understood in Japanese as a shorthand slang term for "joshi kousei", meaning a female high school student. But instead, the new member turned out to be Junko Koshino, a famous fashion designer who is 74 years old. She was an active member of the group for just one week, and was appointed an honorary lifelong member on 5 November. On the 10th, Megumi Coshoji made her debut as the new 6th member of Bis. The group then set out on the first dates of their tour and worked towards their goal of disbanding at Budokan.

==== 2014: Stupig, Who Killed Idol?, The Budokan Disbandment Goal fails ====
January 2014 saw Bis release the single "Stupig", a digital hardcore track produced by Takeshi Ueda of AA= and The Mad Capsule Markets. A sequel to their film "Idol is Dead", titled "Idol is Dead: Non-chan's Great Propaganda War" was released. The release of Bis' album Who Killed Idol?, advertised as their last as a group, took place on the March 5. The album includes a sequel to their classic song "Primal." called "Primal.2" and also a cover of "Primal." by The Yellow Monkey. On February 12, it was announced the group gave up on their goal of disbanding at Nippon Budokan, and that instead they would disband on July 8, at Yokohama Arena, with a concert titled 'Bis Nari no Budokan' (Budokan a la BiS). Members have stated that they were left with no choice but to give up the Budokan, due to some "important people" of the venue condemning Bis' wild antics as inappropriate for the venue. They started their last tour from April 13 to June 29, called "The Bis Who Sold the World Tour", which was later extended to June 30, due to tickets selling out. On April 30, a special edit for the music video of "Final Dance", which is an A-side of their last single, was released onto YouTube. Their final best-of album, "Urya-Oi!!!" was released on July 2. Tracks from "Give me your love all" to "Fly" were re-recorded with the vocals of the current six members, most of them with updated instrumentals. They also conducted a joint gig with experimental visual-kei band Sug on June 25.

==== 2014: Disbandment ====
Bis concluded their "The Bis Who Sold the World" tour at the Sapporo Bessie Hall on June 30, and went on to perform their disbandment concert at the Yokohama Arena on July 8. The concert was the longest ever performed by the group, consisting of 48 songs (including guest appearances by former members Rio Michibayashi, Rina Yokoyama and Yukiko Nakayama). Nearly every song released by the group was performed, and the setlist was composed so that newer songs were performed first and older songs were performed last. At the end of the concert, the future paths of each of the members were announced: First Summer Uika and Nozomi Hirano would form Billie Idle; Saki Kamiya would form Pla2me with Mari Mizuta; Megumi Coshoji would form Maison Book Girl; Tentenko would start a solo/DJ career; Pour Lui would continue to perform with Lui Frontic Matsukuma Japan. In addition, in classic Bis style, a concert by "Ex. Bis" was announced for the next day at the Shimokitazawa Shelter. Tickets were exclusively 30,000 yen, including an "all you can eat buffet" (revealed on the day to be McDonald's). This July 9 show marked the true end of Bis.

==== Post disbandment ====
It was announced in January 2015 that Junnosuke Watanabe, along with members of the team that initially conceived Bis would be putting together a successor group Bish. Auditions were held and the group made their debut in March.

Billie Idle held a concert titled "Brand-new Idle Society" on December 12, 2015, which also featured Pop, Maison Book Girl, Lui Frontic Akabane Japan and Tentenko. Following this, a joint tour of the former Bis members' groups titled the "Anarchy Tour" was announced for February~March 2016, concluding with a show at the Hibiya Yagai Ongakudo on April 29 titled "Idle is Dead!?".

On July 8, 2024, Bis held a free concert to celebrate the ten year anniversary of their disbandment.

=== Second generation ===
==== 2016: Reformation ====
Exactly two years after Bis' disbandment, it was announced by former Bis leader Pour Lui, sound producer Kenta Matsukuma and former manager Junnosuke Watanabe, that Bis would reform under a new lineup, and auditions were going to be held. Pour Lui was the only member from the previous incarnation of Bis to be part of the line up, although former members were welcome to take part in the auditions. As a new beginning to Bis, a Pour Lui solo song titled "BisBis" was released through OTOTOY as a free download.

On August 30, 2016, the Bis YouTube channel uploaded videos of eleven audition finalists: Koshouji Megumu, Maina The End, Tontonko, Bug Me, Nagayama Yukiko, Yokoyama Hina, Michihayashi Rio, Terayama Yufu, Cent Chihiro Tsuttsu, Second Summer Uika, and Hirano Nozomu.

The finalists participated in a four-day audition which was live-streamed on Niconico, following a similar format to Morning Musume's initial auditions on the TV show ASAYAN.

This audition resulted in the addition of Maina The End, Koshouji Megumu, Yokoyama Hina, and Nagayama Yukiko, who adopted the stage names of Kika Front Frontale, Aya Eightprince, Go Zeela, and Peri Ubu, respectively. Peri Ubu was allowed to join on the condition that she finish a bowl of curry made with jolokia hot sauce.

The five-member incarnation of the group released their first album, Brand-new idol Society 2, in late 2016. The album consists mostly of re-recorded Bis hit songs, but also includes five new tracks.

==== 2017: New members, the Diet or Die controversy, major debut ====
The reformed Bis, named in official materials as the "Brand-new BiS", released their second album, Re:Stupid in February.

It was announced at the same time that an audition would be held for all groups managed by WACK (Watanabe Artistic Creative Kabushikigaisha, a management company formed by Watanabe Junnosuke after the disband of Bis to manage Kamiya Saki's group Pla2me), and Pour Lui and Aya Eightprince joined the audition bootcamp as representatives of Bis. The three-day audition concluded with a performance from each group involved, and the results were announced - Pan Luna Leafy and Momoland were added to Bis, while two other successful applicants were selected for a collaborative project between WACK and major label Avex Trax, known as Project aW. It was also announced that Aya Eightprince and former Bis member Saki Kamiya would trade places, with Aya moving to Gang Parade and Saki returning to Bis. This lineup of Bis released the single "Socialism" at the end of May.

At the same time, leader Pour Lui began to appear in a series of videos on the Bis YouTube channel named "Diet or Die", a documentary series showing Pour Lui attending the popular personal fitness gym Rizap in order to lose weight. The first episode of the series states that if she fails to meet a target weight, she will have to pay for the cost of the course herself. However, later in the series, Pour Lui gains rebound weight, and is instructed to lose it under threat of being suspended from Bis. When she is unable to do so, Watanabe announces his decision to suspend Lui from all Bis activities, including an upcoming one-man concert at Akasaka Blitz. The video then appears to show Pour Lui hiding her face, tearfully apologising to fans.

The now-deleted video generated an outrage from fans and non-fans alike, accruing several thousand dislikes in the space of a week and earning coverage on news sites including HuffPost. In response to the backlash, Pour Lui and Watanabe recorded a song titled "Best Friend" together, in which they apologise to fans for taking advantage of them, and thanking HuffPost for spreading the group's name. However, Pour Lui was still under suspension, and did not appear with Bis until October 6, at their "Idol is Dead" concert. The concert began with a 6-member Bis performing together, but during five consecutive performances of the song "Paprika", Saki Kamiya called out for Pour Lui to join them on stage.

Bis later released "I Can't Say No!!!!!". At the end of the "IDOL is DEAD" show, it was announced that Bis would make their second major-label debut, this time from Nippon Crown subsidiary Crown Stones.

==== 2018: Second major debut, more major changes ====
On January 6, the group's leader and founding member Pour Lui announced her intention to graduate at the final date of the group's 2nd "Beginning Tour" at Heavy Sick Zero because since Bis got a major-label deal recently, that the group does not need her and she no longer needed them either. Her last show was held at the Ryogoku Kokugikan Sumo Arena on March 4, 2018.

On February 20, Aya Eightprince returned from her rental period in Gang Parade, rejoining the group for their debut single from Crown Stones, "Whole Lotta Love / Dipromise", released March 7, 2018. Kamiya Saki's last performance with Bis before being returned to Gang Parade was held on 3 March, however, the end of the trade period was not made official until the ending ceremony at the March 4th Ryogoku Kokugikan show. "Whole Lotta Love" became the first Bis song not to feature any original members, while "Dipromise" is the last Bis recording to feature Pour Lui and Kamiya Saki.

In the middle of March, an audition was held to find new members for Bis, Bish, Gang Parade, and the newly debuted Empire. This resulted in a major overhaul to the way Bis operates: the group would be split into two teams, named Bis 1st and Bis 2nd. Bis 1st featured current members Go Zeela and Pan Luna Leafy, plus new members Nel Nehru (formerly Orangeko Vampire) and Toriaez Hana (formerly Cent Chihiro Tette). Bis 2nd featured Kika Front Frontale, Peri Ubu, Aya Eightprince, with new members Mewclub (formerly Choushouji Megumi) and Muropanako (formerly Ayuna C). Yuina Empire, a member of Empire, was given a permanent transfer to Bis 2nd. The lineup did not take effect until a new tour in June. A new single, "Don't miss it!!", was announced for release on July 4, in three versions: Bis 1st released two limited-edition versions of the single, featuring bonus footage of the "Who Killed Idol?" show at Ryogoku Kokugikan, while Bis 2nd released a CD-only version.

Momoland was originally intended to debut as part of Bis 1st, along with a new member using the temporary stage name Gamiya Saki, but due to both members choosing to leave Bis before the release of "Don't Miss It!!", Bis 1st consisted of four members. This system was referred to as "Bis.League", and the top four members voted for by fans were to make up future iterations of Bis 1st.

On April 18, Momoland did not appear at Bis' scheduled show, sending a message to the other members that read "I can't go today." She did not respond to contact and the show was held with five members. On April 20, it was announced that Momoland would leave Bis, due to physical and mental exhaustion. The rest of Bis' "I Don't Know What Will Happen Tour" was held with five members until the new members debuted in June.

In November 2018, Bis released "Against the Pain", their second single under the Bis.League system. Bis 1st (Go Zeela, Toriaez Hana, Aya Eightprince, and Pan Luna Leafy) released it in the form of a collector's box edition limited to 1,000 copies, while Bis 2nd released it as a single CD. "Against the Pain" also contained voting tickets for the Bis.League system, and voting continued until December 24.

==== 2019: Abolishment of Bis.League, "Are You Ready?", and disbandment ====
After the voting period for "Against the Pain" had ended, the results were announced at the final date of the "I Don't Know What Will Happen Tour": Bis 1st was to consist of Go Zeela, Aya Eightprince, Kika Front Frontale and Peri Ubu, while Pan Luna Leafy, Mewclub, Nel Nehru, Yuina Empire, Muropanako, and Toriaez Hana were placed in Bis 2nd. However, manager Watanabe announced that the Bis.League system would be abolished for the next single, and all 10 members were to perform on it. Despite this, five members were designated for assignment: Aya Eightprince, Yuina Empire, Muropanako, Toriaez Hana, and Nel Nehru. The future of these members in Bis was to be decided by the sales figures of the new Bis single, "Are You Ready?", released in March. It was announced that "Are You Ready?" was to be used as the ending theme for the anime show Yu-Gi-Oh! VRAINS from April onwards.

On January 1, 2019, Nel Nehru announced her immediate departure from Bis, bringing the number of members DFA to four. The nine-member Bis went on to promote "Are You Ready?" with a 69-hour release event consisting of song performances, fan interaction and merchandise sales, and sleeping on stage. The single charted at 2nd place, the highest position for a Bis single to date, but the four members designated for assignment were still sent to participate in a week-long WACK audition bootcamp.

During the bootcamp, Aya Eightprince, Yuina Empire, Toriaez Hana, Muropanako, Mayu Empire (of Empire) and Ayuni D (of Bish), were each assigned to lead a team of new audition candidates. On day four of the camp, it was announced that any Bis member to be eliminated from the auditions would also lose her place in Bis. On day four, Aya Eightprince was eliminated. On the morning of day six, Toriaez Hana lost a sit-up challenge to avoid elimination and was subsequently eliminated.

The results of the audition were publicly announced on the March 30 at the free WACK Exhibition event where Bis performed with the eliminated members. They announced that the 9 members of the group unanimously agreed to disband Bis for the second time rather than continue with members missing. The final concert of Bis' 2nd generation was held on 11 May, the final date of their "Are you ready to go?" tour.

=== Third generation ===
==== 2019–2021: Second reformation and Lookie ====
Auditions were held in April 2019 to find members for a third iteration of the group. One month after the second generation's disbandment the third generation members: Manako Chiii Manako, Chantmonkee, Neo Trees, Toggy and Ito Musensiteebu, were revealed. Their eyes were obscured until they each reached 15,000 followers on Twitter. Bis' third generation released their first album, Brand-new idol Society, on August 14. A day before this, Manako Chiii Manako withdrew from the group. A new member, Zuzu Death, was set to join the group in late September, however, she withdrew before her face was revealed to the public. The first major single of the third generation, "Dead or a Lime", was released in November. A re-recorded version of Brand-new idol Society titled Brand-new idol Society (New Type Ver.) followed in January 2020.

Their second album, Lookie, was released in February 2020. Their first EP, Anti Conformist Superstar, was released in August, followed by their second EP, Killing Idols, in February 2021. They released their second single, "Touch Me / Love" in May. On November 3, they released a split single with ZOC. On November 4, Nano3 joined the group. In December, they released the cover album Bis Dive into Rocks.

==== 2022–2025: Never Mind and disbandment ====
On February 18, 2022, Toggy went on hiatus due to a leg injury. The group's third single, "Da Da Da Dance Song", was also released in February, followed by their fourth single, "Hey Boy Hey Girl" in July. On July 18, Chantmonkee left Bis. On October 14, Hyuga was unveiled as a new member of the group.

Ito Musensiteebu and Neo Trees graduated from the group on January 8, 2023. On March 25, it was announced that three new members, Changadult, Aika The Police, and Hitorikko, later known as Shion Epic, Iko Mugennokanata and Kurenai World's End, would join the group. They made their debut on May 14. Their fifth single, "E-R-T-H-C-Na-H-Q-ka-H-K-M-B-Ne-Z-Om", was released in July, followed by their sixth single, "Lazy Dance", in November.

Their third album, Never Mind, was released in February 2024. Shion Epic withdrew from the group on March 5. On April 1, Bis members began to self-manage the group. On August 9, Bis announced plans to disband. Bis performed outside of Japan for the first time at a multi-artist WACK event alongside ASP and Mameshiba no Taigun Tonai Bousho a.k.a. MonsterIdol at The Underworld in London on August 28. A re-recorded version of Never Mind titled Never Mind (New Type Ver.), was released on September 4. Bis disbanded on January 12, 2025, after their final concert at Hibiya Open-Air Concert Hall.

== Former members ==
=== First Generation ===
- Pour Lui (プー・ルイ)
- Nozomi Hirano (ヒラノノゾミ, Hirano Nozomi)
- Rina Yokoyama (ヨコヤマリナ, Yokoyama Rina)
- Yukiko Nakayama (ナカヤマユキコ, Nakayama Yukiko)
- Yufu Terashima (テラシマユフ, Terashima Yufu)
- Yurika Wakisaka (ワキサカユリカ,Wakisaka Yurika)
- Rio Michibayashi (ミチバヤシリオ, Michibayashi Rio)
- Tentenko (テンテンコ)
- First Summer Uika (ファーストサマーウイカ)
- Saki Kamiya (カミヤサキ, Kamiya Saki)
- Megumi Coshoji (コショージメグミ, Koshouji Megumi)

=== Second Generation ===
- Pour Lui (プー・ルイ)
- Saki Kamiya (カミヤサキ, Kamiya Saki)
- Momoland (ももらんど)
- Nel Nehru (ネル・ネール)
- Kika Front Frontale (キカ・フロント・フロンタール)
- Peri Ubu (ペリ・ウブ)
- Go Zeela (ゴ・ジーラ)
- Pan Luna Leafy (パン・ルナリーフィ)
- Muropanako (ムロパナコ)
- Mewclub (ミュークラブ)
- Yuina Empire (YUiNA EMPiRE)
- Aya Eightprince (アヤ・エイトプリンス)
- Toriaez Hana (トリアエズ・ハナ)

=== Third Generation ===
- Manako Chiii Manako (マナコ・チー・マナコ)
- Zuzu Death (ズズ・デス)
- Chantmonkee (チャントモンキー)
- Ito Musensiteebu (イトー・ムセンシティ部)
- Neo Trees (ネオ・トゥリーズ)
- Shion Epic (シオンエピック)
- Toggy (トギー)
- Nano3 (ナノ3)
- Hyuga (ヒューガー)
- Iko Mugennokanata (イコ・ムゲンノカナタ)
- Kurenai World’s End (クレナイ･ワールズエンド)

== Image ==
Bis adopt an image very different from the traditional idol group. Their music videos touch on themes such as point-of-view pornography and sexual violence, attracting both positive and negative attitudes from viewers. Pour Lui noted that many are difficult to watch, and Avex staff member Ryuta Ochi explains "They [Bis] wanted to make a deliberate uglification of idol events." The image of a typical idol is generally accepted as being pure and good-natured, which Bis reject. A 2014 photoshoot in Weekly Playboy saw them fully nude and covered in fake semen. In December 2013, they posed nude for the magazine Quick Japan.

Their debut was rather down to earth musically, though since their switch to a major label they have explored genres such as digital hardcore, noise music, and ska punk. The majority of Bis songs have lyrics written by the members themselves,

After the group reformed, their image became less confrontational, albeit while retaining a darker, "alternative" theme. Moshing, stage diving and lifting were banned at their concerts, previously known for a rowdy and violent atmosphere. Bis manager Watanabe Junnosuke has explained that during the initial run of Bis, certain concert venues refused to book the group, and companies were unwilling to use them or their music for promotional purposes, making it difficult for the group to create a profit.

In 2019, the new Bis received their first major commercial tie-in with the anime Yu-Gi-Oh! VRAINS, which used their single "Are You Ready?" as its fifth ending theme song. The song, which exceeds 11 minutes in length and includes explicit references to irrumatio in the lyrics, incorporates elements of hardcore punk and noise, reminiscent of their earlier collaboratory efforts with Hijokaidan.

== Discography ==
Bis discography
- Studio albums: 8
- Extended plays: 2
- Compilation albums: 4
- Singles: 25
- Video albums: 9
- Cover albums: 1

=== Studio albums ===
Title	Album details	Peak positions	
Title	Album details	JPN Oricon	JPN Billboard
1st Generation
Brand-new idol Society	Released: March 23, 2011; Label: Tsubasa Records; Formats: CD, digital download	—	—
Idol Is Dead	Released: October 24, 2012; Label: Avex Trax; Formats: CD, digital download	30	—
Who Killed Idol?	Released: March 5, 2014; Label: Avex Trax; Formats: CD, digital download	14	—
2nd Generation
Brand-new idol Society 2	Released: November 16, 2016; Label: Tsubasa Records; Formats: CD, digital download	24	27
Re:Stupid	Released: February 22, 2017; Label: Tsubasa Records; Formats: CD, digital download	25	—
3rd Generation
Brand-new idol Society	Released: August 14, 2019; Re-released on January 29, 2020 (New Type Ver.); Label: Nippon Crown; Formats: CD, digital download	9	13
Lookie	Released: February 5, 2020; Label: Nippon Crown; Formats: CD, digital download	6	8
Never Mind	Released: February 28, 2024; Re-released on September 4, 2024 (New Type Ver.); Label: Nippon Crown; Formats: CD, digital download	6	7
"—" denotes a recording that did not chart or was not released in that territory.

=== Cover albums ===
Title	Album details	Peak positions	
Title	Album details	JPN Oricon	JPN Billboard
3rd Generation
Bis Dive into Rocks	Released: December 1, 2021; Label: Nippon Crown; Formats: CD, digital download	14	15

=== Compilation albums ===
Title	Album details	Peak positions	
Title	Album details	JPN Oricon	JPN Billboard
1st Generation
Bisukete (びすけて)	Released: September 26, 2012; Label: Avex Trax; Formats: CD, digital download	—	—
Bis Otameshi Best!! (Bis お試しBest!!)	Released: January 24, 2014; Label: Avex Trax; Formats: Rental CD+DVD	—	—
Urya-Oi!!! (うりゃおい!!!)	Released: July 2, 2014; Re-released: January 23, 2015; Label: Avex Trax; Formats: CD, digital download	11	—
3rd Generation
"Propaganda" to "Propaganda" (プロパガンダとPropaganda)	Released: November 25, 2020; Label: Nippon Crown; Formats: CD, digital download	22	24
"—" denotes a recording that did not chart or was not released in that territory.

=== Remix albums ===
Title	Album details	Peak positions
Title	Album details	JPN Oricon
DJ Megumi's Bis Mix	Released: May 27, 2015; Label: Avex Trax; Formats: CD, digital download	138

=== Extended plays ===
Title	Album details	Peak positions	
Title	Album details	JPN Oricon	JPN Billboard
3rd Generation
Anti Conformist Superstar	Released: August 19, 2020; Label: Nippon Crown; Formats: CD, digital download	7	8
Killing Idols	Released: February 24, 2021; Label: Nippon Crown; Formats: CD, digital download	10	12

=== Singles ===
==== As lead artist ====
Title	Year	Peak positions		Certifications	Album
Title	Year	JPN Oricon	JPN Billboard	Certifications	Album
1st Generation
"My Ixxx"	2011	83	—		Idol Is Dead
"Primal."	2011	64	—		Idol Is Dead
"PPCC"	2012	31	—		Idol Is Dead
"Bisimulation"	2013	14	61		Who Killed Idol?
"Die"	2013	6	90		Who Killed Idol?
"Fly"	2013	8	44		Who Killed Idol?
"Hi"	2013	8	—		Who Killed Idol?
"Stupig"	2014	7	54		Who Killed Idol?
"Final Dance"	2014	4	45		Urya-Oi!!!
"Nerve"	2014	4	—		Urya-Oi!!!
2nd Generation
"Socialism"	2017	13	44		Non-album singles
"I Can't Say No!!!!!!!"	2017	5	8		Non-album singles
"Whole Lotta Love"	2018	4	8		Non-album singles
"Dipromise"	2018	4	—		Non-album singles
"Don't Miss It!!" (Note: "Don't Miss It!!" was released during Bis.League. Bis 1st's version of the song charted at number 4 on Oricon and number 15 on Billboard, and Bis 2nd's version of the song charted at number 3 on Oricon and number 13 on Billboard.)	2018	3/4	13/15		Non-album singles
"Against the Pain (アゲンストザペイン)" (Note: "Against the Pain" was released during Bis.League. Bis 1st's version of the song charted at number 6 on Oricon and number 16 on Billboard, and Bis 2nd's version of the song charted at number 5 on Oricon and number 17 on Billboard.)	2018	5/6	16/17		Non-album singles
"Are You Ready?"	2019	2	8	RIAJ: Gold	Non-album singles
3rd Generation
"Dead or a Lime"	2019	5	20		Non-album singles
"Touch Me"	2021	12	—		Non-album singles
"Love"	2021	12	—		Non-album singles
"Katsurei Girl (割礼Girl) (Note: "Katsurei Girl" by Bis is the first track from the split single "Katsurei Girl / Begging" (割礼Girl / Begging). The second track "Begging" is by ZOC)	2021	14	—		Non-album singles
"Da Da Da Dance Song"	2022	3	48		Non-album singles
"Hey Boy Hey Girl"	2022	4	84		Non-album singles
"E-R-T-H-C-Na-H-Q-ka-H-K-M-B-Ne-Z-Om" (イーアーティエイチスィーナーエイチキューカーエイチケームビーネーズィーウーオム)	2023	3	13		Never Mind
"Lazy Dance"	2023	6	52		Never Mind
"—" denotes a recording that did not chart or was not released in that territory.

==== Collaborations ====
Title	Year	Peak chart positions	Album
Title	Year	Oricon	Album
"Anytime Anything" with Yuki Kashiwagi	2021	12	Non-album single

== Videography ==
=== Live albums ===
Title	Album details	Peak positions	
Title	Album details	JPN	
Title	Album details	JPN DVD	JPN Blu-ray
Road to Budokan Kokugikan: Who Killed Idol?	Released: 16 December 2013; Label: Avex Trax; Formats: DVD	51	—
Bis Kaisan Live "Bis nari no Budokan" (Bis解散Live 「Bisなりの武道館」 @横浜アリーナ)	Released: 24 September 2014; Label: Avex Trax; Formats: DVD, Blu-ray	39	45
Heart-Shaped Bis It's Too Late Edition No Audience Live	Released: 14 October 2020; Label: Nippon crown; Formats: Blu-ray	—	9
"—" denotes a recording that did not chart or was not released in that territory.

=== Movies ===
Title	Album details	Peak positions	
Title	Album details	JPN	
Title	Album details	JPN DVD	JPN Blu-ray
Backstage Idol Story Blu-ray Volume 1 (Episode 1-4) (バックステージ・アイドル・ストーリー Blu-ray 上巻(第1話～第4話))	Animation series; Released: 20 February 2013; Label: Space shower network; Formats: Blu-ray	—	—
Backstage Idol Story Blu-ray Volume 2 (Episode 5-8) (バックステージ・アイドル・ストーリー Blu-ray 下巻(第5話～第8話))	Animation series; Released: 20 February 2013; Label: Space shower network; Formats: Blu-ray	—	—
Idol Is Dead (アイドル・イズ・デッド)	Fiction movie; Released: 8 January 2014; Label: King Records; Formats: DVD, Blu-ray	—	—
Idol Is Dead-Non Chan no Propaganda Dai Senso- <Cho Kanzen Ban> (アイドル・イズ・デッド-ノンちゃんのプロパガンダ大戦争-＜超完全版＞)	Fiction movie; Released: 28 May 2014; Label: King Records; Formats: DVD, Blu-ray	—	—
Kanzen Ban Bis Cannonball 2014 (完全版 Bisキャノンボール 2014)	Documentary film; Released: 22 July 2015; Label: Space shower network; Formats: DVD	57	—
All You Need is Punk and Love	Documentary film; Released: 9 December 2017; Label: Space shower network; Formats: DVD	40	—
"—" denotes a recording that did not chart or was not released in that territory.
