= Pour Lui =

Japanese singer (born 1990)

Pour Lui プールイ
- Also known as: プー・ルイ
- Born: August 20, 1990 (age 36); Saitama, Japan
- Genres: Pop rock; alternative rock; punk rock; J-pop
- Occupations: Japanese idol, singer, musician
- Instruments: Vocals, guitar
- Years active: 2009–present
- Label: Tsubasa Records
- Website: pour-lui.syncl.jp//

Pour Lui (プールイ, Puu Rui; born August 20, 1990 in Saitama) is a Japanese singer known for her work as the founder and leader of the alternative idol group Bis. Pour Lui started her career in November 2009 as a solo singer, being promoted as a "new age rock icon". She released her debut album; The World Is Pour Lui's in 2010. She announced that she would be indefinitely suspending her solo career, and would be forming an idol group, which would eventually become Bis. She was one of only two original members remaining by the time Bis disbanded in July 2014. She was often seen as the "face" of the group and was often supportive of the sometimes drastic and extreme measures that were used to gain the group publicity. This led to tensions between the members, most notably Yufu Terashima and Rina Yokoyama. Pour Lui formed the rock band Lui Frontic Akabane Japan (then named Lui Frontic Matsukuma Japan) in December 2013, with former members of The Storefront and Bis songwriter/producer Kenta Matsukuma. Once Bis disbanded, she focused her activities with the band until their disbandment in 2017. Two years after Bis' disbandment, Pour Lui relaunched the group with new members and remained a member until early 2018. Later that year she became a member of Billie Idle and remained a member until their disbandment at the end of 2019. She released her second album, The World Is Pour Lui's II, in 2020, and launched the new idol group Piggs. She graduated from Piggs in 2025 and founded the idol group Pigmonz.

== Career ==
=== 2009–2010: Solo career ===
Pour Lui's debut digital single "Kagirareta Toki no Naka de☆" was released on November 4, 2009, and was nominated in the 4th RecoChoku New Artist Awards, gaining her some attention. Her second digital single "Why?" was released on January 13, 2010. She performed her first live show on March 25. This was followed by the album The World Is Pour Lui's on June 23, which topped the Tower Records Online Pre-order Daily chart for the 20th, and the Online Sales chart for the 24th.

Her solo music was billed as "cyber emo" and "Beat Crusaders meets Perfume", with its combination of alternative rock music and electro-pop vocal editing.

On September 9, she suddenly announced that she would be indefinitely suspending her solo career, and that she would be forming an idol group in the near future. She performed what was to be her last concert as a solo artist on December 9, 2010, where she also announced the formation of Bis.

=== 2011–2014: Bis ===
Pour Lui has stated that she originally made the decision to form an idol group out of a desire to cause trouble for her manager Junnosuke Watanabe, who she strongly disliked at the time. She later overcame this and has been on good terms with him since. The original lineup of Bis debuted in January 2011 and actively performed in support of their first album Brand-new idol Society. However tensions began to rise when the music video for "Paprika" was being filmed, and eventually resulted in Rina Yokoyama, who was unsatisfied with the "un-idol" like direction the group was starting to take, leaving the group in June. Pour Lui was behind the idea of the music video involving members headbanging while wearing stockings on their heads, which directly led to Yokoyama's departure.

More controversy followed with the release of the single "My Ixxx" and its music video. The video, showing the three members of Bis running naked (albeit heavily censored in an artistic way) through a forest, drastically spread their name across a wide audience, and led to an increased fanbase. However, it also led some to wrongly associate Bis's members and their management to pornography, and the subject was still debated after the group's break up.

After Bis made its major label debut through Avex Trax, tensions rose again during the making of the music video for "Ash". Pour Lui proposed the group follow in the steps of "My Ixxx" but was met with fierce opposition from the other members, especially Yufu Terashima. This resulted in a rift forming between the two, which never fully repaired. Pour Lui continued to lead Bis into never-before-seen territory as idols, including a 100 km super-marathon. Pour Lui was unable to complete the run, but Yurika Wakisaka came close, only to run out of time. However, this resulted in Wakisaka injuring her leg, and her eventual departure from the group. Yufu Terashima followed shortly after.

While several tensions between members plagued the lineups from 2011–2012, after First Summer Uika, Tentenko and Saki Kamiya joined the group in May 2013, the number of such incidents dropped significantly, and most clashes that occurred were with their management. When Rio Michibayashi left in September, it was due to the fact that she wanted a stable income, and not because of internal tensions. The general good relations stayed with the group until its disbandment. While Pour Lui maintains almost no contact with Rina Yokoyama and Yufu Terashima, she still meets with the members of the final lineup often.

In 2013, Pour Lui appeared in a Dramatic Dream Team professional wrestling match in order to promote Bis. She defeated Fukuda Hiroshi with her signature move, the Pour Lui Special Cowper Vacuum. She also appeared in a rare solo concert at the Extra!!! event in August, where Bis member First Summer Uika played drums.

=== 2013–2017: Lui Frontic Akabane Japan ===
Pour Lui announced the formation of a rock band named Lui Frontic Matsukuma Japan in December 2013, to be active alongside Bis. The band consisted of Tempest Takeuchi and Ohara Just Begun, both formerly of The Storefront, and Kenta Matsukuma, Bis' sound producer. They released their debut mini-album Japonica!! on February 19, 2014. After Bis' disbandment, Pour Lui focused activity on this band. Their second mini-album Japonica!!2 came out in August, followed by extensive touring. The band was dealt a loss when Matsukuma, part of the band's namesake, announced his departure in November. They continued on, and announced that their concert of January 11 at the Shibuya Club Quattro would be their last as an indie band. They also stated that if the show sold out, they would move up to "The Next Step", while if it didn't, they would go on hiatus. The show sold out, and it was announced at the concert that they would be making their major label debut from Universal Japan in March. It was also announced that they would change their name to Lui Frontic Akabane Japan, and continue as a three piece. The band announced their disbandment on April 28, 2017.

=== 2016–2018: Bis Reformation ===
It was announced on July 8, 2016, exactly two years after the disbandment of Bis, that the group would reform around Pour Lui under a new lineup, and that auditions were going to be held. Pour Lui played a key role in initiating the reformation by contacting former Bis manager Junnosuke Watanabe.

=== 2018: Graduation from Bis and joining Billie Idle ===
Pour Lui announced her intention to graduate from Bis in January, a decision which would be made final at the group's Ryogoku Kokugikan show in March. Her last song with Bis was "Dipromise", intended to be a farewell song to her. A music video for the song was released, showing various footage of Pour Lui taken from 2009 to 2018.

On April 1, Pour Lui announced that she intended to start a new career as a YouTuber, launching her channel "BYS: Brand-new YouTuber Society".

Pour Lui made a surprise appearance during the encore of the final show of Billie Idle's "P.S.R.I.P." Tour where she performed a cover of Seikima-II's "Fire After Fire" with the group. It was then announced that she would be joining the group as a full-time member starting June 6.

=== 2019–2020: Billie Idle's disbandment and formation of Piggs ===
In October 2019, it was announced that Billie Idle would dissolve after the last performance of their one-man tour titled "BILLIE IDLE TOUR LAST ORGY" on December 28 of the same year.

On January 6, 2020, it was revealed that Pour Lui had founded her own company, PourPourLand, and would be forming a new group under the temporary name "Idol Laboratories", of which she would produce and be a member. It was also announced that Pour Lui would release her second solo album, The World Is Pour Lui's II, on March 11. The final line-up of the group temporarily named "Idol Laboratories" was revealed in April alongside the name Piggs. They released their debut album, Hallo Piggs, on July 1.

=== 2025-2026: Graduation from Piggs and formation of Pigmonz ===
Pour Lui announced that she would be graduating from Piggs on November 29, 2025. She would also be forming a new idol group of whom, like Piggs, she would simultaneously be the producer and a member.

On January 9, 2026, she revealed the name for her new idol project: Pigmonz. The group held their live debut on March 21, 2026.

== Discography ==
=== Albums ===
Title	Album details	Peak positions
Title	Album details	JPN Oricon
The World Is Pour Lui's (みんなのプー・ルイ, Minna no Pour Lui)	Released: June 23, 2010; Label: Tsubasa Records; Formats: CD, digital download	—
The World Is Pour Lui's II (みんなのプー・ルイII, Minna no Pour Lui II)	Released: March 11, 2020; Label: WACKdonald Records; Formats: CD, digital download	103
"—" denotes a recording that did not chart or was not released in that territory.

=== Digital singles ===
Release date	Title
November 4, 2009	"Kagirareta Toki no Naka de☆" (限られた時間の中で☆)
January 13, 2010	"Why?"
December 15, 2010	"Elegant no Kaibutsu" (エレガントの怪物)
