= List of Jewelpet Sunshine episodes =

- Cover Art of the First DVD-Box set
- No. of episodes: 52 (79 segments)

Release
- Original network: TV Tokyo, TV Osaka
- Original release: April 9, 2011 – March 31, 2012

Series chronology
- ← Previous; Jewelpet Twinkle Next → Jewelpet Kira Deco!

Jewelpet Sunshine (Japanese: ジュエルペット サンシャイン, Hepburn: Juerupetto Sanshain) is the third Jewelpet anime television series created by Sanrio and Sega. It began airing on TV Tokyo between April 9, 2011, and March 31, 2012, on TV Tokyo. The series focuses on the main heroines Kanon Mizushiro and Ruby, who attend Sunshine Academy as part of the Class 3 Plum Section.

The opening theme is "Go! Go! Sunshine" (Go! Go! サンシャイン, Go! Go! Sanshain) by Mayumi Gojo while the ending theme is "Nowadays Maiden" (イマドキ乙女, Imadoki Otome) by Kayano Masuyama and Misuzu Mochizuki.

== Episode list ==
No.	Title	Original release date
1	"Teacher Iruka Came Yay!/Love Letters Found Yay!"; Transliteration: "Iruka sensei ga yattekita Ieie! / Raburetā mikke Ieie!" (Japanese: イルカ先生がやって来たイェイッ! / ラブレターみっけイェイッ!)	April 9, 2011
Teacher Iruka Came Yay!: Ruby and her classmates study on Jewel Land's Sunshine Academy until their new teacher comes along. Due to Ruby's prank, he may not ever teach anymore unless the class does something to let him stay. Love Letters Found Yay!: A Love Letter brings a serious commotion to Ruby's class and Kanon is seriously embarrassed by it. To make matters worse, Teacher Iruka is about to read it.
2	"Labra and Angela Yay!/Hinata and Peridot Yay!"; Transliteration: "Rabura to enjera ga Ieie! / Hinata to peridotto mo Ieie!" (Japanese: ラブラとエンジェラがイェイッ! / ひなたとペリドットもイェイッ!)	April 16, 2011
Labra and Angela Yay!: Labra finally found her new jewel powers, but due to her strong powers, it has caused a lot of problems in the academy. Angela finally get annoyed and stops her before her magic goes out of control. Hinata and Peridot Yay!: Hinata's welcomes her new roommate Peridot, but Peridot wants her to get active, thought she is a timid girl. She does what she can to be more athletic in the end. Ruby however, wants to switch roommates due to her being fed up with Kanon.
3	"Garnet Keeps Up Yay!/Me and Somebody...Yay!"; Transliteration: "Gānetto ganbaru Ieie! / Darekaga watashi o･･･Ieie!" (Japanese: ガーネットがんばるイェイッ! / 誰かが私を･･･イェイッ!)	April 23, 2011
Garnet Keeps Up Yay!: Garnet is well known as the fashionista in the Sunshine Academy. When Diana comes along and steals the spotlight, Garnet is sad and jealous. She decides to join the Miss Sunshine Academy to be more famous, but ends up in a comedy contest instead. Me and Somebody...Yay!: Ruby had a problem with a stalker, who is following her all over Jewel Land. She consults to her friends to see if they can help her. The stalker is later revealed as a crocodile named Waniko.
4	"Sapphie's Secret Yay!"; Transliteration: "Safī no himitsu Ieie!" (Japanese: サフィーのひみつイェイッ!)	April 30, 2011
During class, Nejikawa, a robot student in the Plum Section shows some affections to Sapphie. As he decides to follow her to her secret lab, she then discovers him stalking her. Later on, they talk about Sapphie's dreams about reaching the stars using a rocket.
5	"Iruka Grand Prix Yay!/Goodbye Plum Section Yay!"; Transliteration: "Iruka guranpuri de Ieie! / Sayonara ume-gumi Ieie!" (Japanese: イルカグランプリでイェイッ! / さよなら梅組イェイッ!)	May 7, 2011
Iruka Grand Prix Yay!: Shouko is angry at Iruka due to his competitiveness, and the school rule saying scooters are not allowed in the academy grounds. The only way to settle this is through the race called the "Iruka Grand Prix". There, she settles her score with the hot-blooded, but stupid teacher... with a little help of course. Goodbye Plum Section Yay!: Jill decides that Sapphie needs to be transferred to the Rose Section, leaving her friends behind while Sango is transferred to the Plum Section. Ruby and her friends decides to get her back to their class.
6	"Ruby's Making Cookies Yay!/Rald's Prohibition Yay!"; Transliteration: "Rubī no kukkī-tsukuri Ieie! / Kindan no rarudo-san Ieie!" (Japanese: ルビーのクッキー作りイェイッ! / 禁断のラルドさんイェイッ!)	May 14, 2011
Ruby's Making Cookies Yay!: Both Ruby and Kanon decide to bake cookies for their crush Mikage, but insanity ensures on each mistake the two make when baking them. Later after Kanon failed, Ruby helps her with a little magic to impress Mikage. Rald's Prohibition Yay!: Iruka wants to punish Rald for not listening, but the students warn him about Rald's secret. Iruka decides to gather some info about him from his students until he finds out the shocking truth.
7	"Thanks Jewel Day Yay!" (Japanese: サンクスジュエルデーにイェイッ!)	May 21, 2011
The class learns about "Thanks Jewel Day", an event held once a year in Jewel Land. Kanon herself believes that the event is rubbish. The next day, Kanon learns that Thanks Jewel Day is a day that Jewelpets need a lot of respect, and Kanon is shocked on how the day goes. After she insults Ruby due to her anger, Kanon is arrested and sent to jail to do serious hard labor, while meeting with Shouko and Jill. Titana decides to bust her out, but ends up destroying the whole prison.
8	"Charlotte's Love Story Yay!/Jasper's Curry Yay!"; Transliteration: "Charotto no koi monogatari Ieie! / Karē naru jasupā Ieie!" (Japanese: チャロットの恋物語イェイッ! / カレーなるジャスパーイェイッ!)	May 28, 2011
Charlotte's Love Story Yay!: The girls find out about Charlotte's strange affection to someone as they investigate her strange behavior. During class, they find out that she has a crush on a mosquito and she is driving her friends nuts on this strange pairing throughout the day. Jasper's Curry Yay!: Jasper decides to stay at Mikage and Masago's apartment after his gets flooded. The next day, both Mikage and Jasper have a rivalry with each other; all because of Mikage's way on eating curry, which angers Jasper to the point of a showdown at the academy.
9	"The Human World Yay!"; Transliteration: "Ningen-kai de Ieie!" (Japanese: 人間界でイェイッ!)	June 4, 2011
Ruby and her friends decide to go to the human world using Garnet's magic. As the tour guide starts, Kanon noticed something strange about the Bus Guide, and she unmasked her, revealing the Jewelpets in disguise. Later on, Ruby follows Mikage into his home and his father allows her inside, alongside Kanon, who recently arrives and kicks Ruby out of the scene. When he gets distracted due to Kanon and Ruby, his father scolds him due to his lack of concentration.
10	"Strawberry Cafe Yay! / Aim for the Scoop! Yay!"; Transliteration: "Sutoroberī kafe de Ieie! / Sukūpu o nerae! Ieie!" (Japanese: ストロベリーカフェでイェイッ! / スクープを狙え! イェイッ!)	June 11, 2011
Strawberry Cafe Yay!: Garnet has been working at the Strawberry Cafe for a long time. But then he sees how much debt the shop and Buster has. She tries to find a way to make the shop popular and earn a lot of money to pay for the debt before the deadline. Aim for the Scoop! Yay!: The President of the Sunshine Newspaper is facing a dilemma about a new issue and how the newspapers are delivered. Peridot feels worried about this and that it will endanger the group until they can find good scoop for the papers.
11	"Welcome Queen Jewelina Yay! / Opal and The Chairman Yay!"; Transliteration: "Yōkoso juerīna-sama Ieie! / Iin-chō to opāru de Ieie!" (Japanese: ようこそジュエリーナ様イェイッ! / 委員長とオパールでイェイッ!)	June 18, 2011
Welcome Queen Jewelina Yay!: Kanon and Hinata found out about Queen Jewelina to be the creator of Jewel Land and the Jewelpets. Feeling curious, Ruby's friends then asked everyone more about their ruler, but it didn't turn out well as they expected. Until Queen Jewelina showed up herself. Opal and The Chairman Yay!: Being angry due to Sapphie getting the highest scores, the chairman of the Plum Section appointed Sapphie to teach the class for a while. Opal, the vice chairman, is trying to do her best to help calm the chairman down, while insanity ensures.
12	"Full of Mud Yay! / The Terror of Black Magic Yay!"; Transliteration: "Doroda rake de Ieie! / Kyōfu no kuroi mahō de Ieie!" (Japanese: どろだらけでイェイッ! / 恐怖の黒い魔法でイェイッ!)	June 25, 2011
Full of Mud Yay!: While walking to school, Kanon gets scared by a frog and fell onto a mud pit. As Mikage helps her get up, she remembers the same experience when she was younger. However, a jealous Ruby is watching over the couple as she plans to get Mikage for herself, and ends up into a mud fight against Kanon. The Terror of Black Magic Yay!: A girl from the Plum Section holds a deep and dark secret. Hinata and the others discover a notebook full of strange rune scriptures and tries to look at until the mysterious girl gets it and runs away. Sapphie however has a bad feeling that she knew about the runes. The next day, Angela was mysteriously kidnapped by the strange girl. Sapphie herself knew about what's happening and why Angela has been kidnapped: to unleash the forbidden Dark Jewel Magic. Ruby and her friends must now save Angela for being sacrificed and prevent the Dark Jewel Magic for unleashing.
13	"Course Consultation Yay!"; Transliteration: "Shinro sōdan de Ieie!" (Japanese: 進路相談でイェイッ!)	July 2, 2011
The Jewelpets in the Plum section need to take a Course Consultation Exam to decide their future, or else they won't advance to the next grade. Ruby talks to Kanon about it last night about her future, with Kanon jokingly said she will not pass. The next day, the Jewelpets were now taking the exam as scheduled, being assigned to different jobs. Iruka has a hard time assigning each of them to their future jobs until it is Ruby's turn, in which Ruby said that she wanted to be a pop idol or marry Mikage.
14	"Throbbing Fireworks Yay! / Paca Paca Paca Yay!"; Transliteration: "Dokidoki hanabi de Ieie! / Pakā Pakā Pakā Ieie!" (Japanese: ドキドキ花火でイェイッ! / パカーパカーパカーイェイッ!)	July 9, 2011
Throbbing Fireworks Yay!: It is Tanabata and Ruby asks Mikage if she can watch the fireworks with him, which he agreed. Later that night, Ruby gets so many distractions and must do many favors. After being done with all the favors, she finally meets Mikage by the lake and they both watch the fireworks together with the song Show Me by Yukari Morikawa playing in the background. A jealous Kanon is watching them both. Paca Paca Paca Yay!: Angela catches a serious cold and is very contagious, in which someone can say "Paca" all the time. Ruby got infected first then her friends in the academy. Insanity then ensures when the whole academy gets infected one by one.
15	"Road Man Titana Yay! / Ghosts Coming Yay!"; Transliteration: "Chitāna no Otokodō Ieie! / Ki Moda Meshi de Ieie!" (Japanese: チターナの男道イェイッ! / きもだめしでイェイッ!)	July 16, 2011
Road Man Titana Yay!: Long ago, Titana was bullied by King and his followers after he accidentally bumped onto him. However, Kanon walked in and defended Titana, making him admiring Kanon. Shouko and her friends saw him working hard, cleaning the floors and decided to see if they can make a man out of Titana. Ghosts Coming Yay!: While looking at Peridot's Jewel Pod, Ruby and her friends notice a ghost in front of the old academy building and decides to investigate it. Later that night, Ruby and her friends learn about Sapphie's fear of ghosts.
16	"Ruby and Sapphie Yay! / Phantom Ruby Yay!"; Transliteration: "Rubī to Safī de Ieie!/ Kaitō Rubi de Ieie!" (Japanese: ルビーとサフィーでイェイッ! / 怪盗ルビーでイェイッ!)	July 23, 2011
Ruby and Sapphie Yay!: The summer heat is affecting everyone in both Jewel Land and the Human World, even in Ruby's class. When Kanon teases her for having no dreams, Ruby consults Sapphie for some advice on her dreams and lets her to be a test subject to Sapphie's inventions, even if this cost Ruby's insurance. Phantom Ruby Yay!: Ruby and her friends planned to do a raid in the Sunshine Academy tonight after they found out that Iruka is keeping something from the students. However, after Hinata accidentally tripped some of the laser sensors, they now got 5 Minutes to get that item before Iruka wakes up.
17	"Desert Island Survival? Yay!"; Transliteration: "Mujintō de Sabaibaru? Ieie!" (Japanese: 無人島でサバイバル? イェイッ!)	July 30, 2011
The first chapter of the Summer Saga. After another trip to the Human World, Labra cries and causes a magical spell to activate, teleporting Ruby and her friends in a deserted island located several miles away from Jewel Land. They were all separated into four groups and they all rely on their wits to survive in the island. As they try to adapt and enjoy themselves in the island, while finding a way back to Jewel Land, one of them is watched by someone unknown.
18	"Dragon Land Yay!"; Transliteration: "Ryūgū rando de Ieie!" (Japanese: リューグーランドでイェイッ!)	August 6, 2011
The second chapter of the Summer Saga. Ruby and her friends finally found out about Rin and the mysterious boy on the beach, who turns to be a prince. He then takes them into the magical city beneath the sea called Dragon Land, on which all sea creatures of Jewel Land live. As they meet the emperor and empress of the nation, they put on their special performances for the people. As they all escape, both Hinata and the Prince fend off the guards. Meanwhile back at the dungeon, Kanon and the others are saved by a mysterious girl and helps them escape.
19	"Pirate's Treasure Yay!"; Transliteration: "Kaizoku no Hihō de Ieie!" (Japanese: 海賊の秘宝でイェイッ!)	August 13, 2011
The third chapter of the Summer Saga. After the mysterious girl and the prince reunited in the borders separating Dragon Land, Ruby and the others are confused. The prince explains that Dragon Land is once a peaceful kingdom and everyone is united, until both rulers became angry with each other and divided the land. The only way to get them back together is to find the legendary treasure called the Rainbow Jewel. As the group reaches the surface, they all agreed to find the Rainbow Jewel to save the others and reunite the torn kingdom.
20	"Summer, Love, and Adventure Yay!"; Transliteration: "Natsu to Koi to Bōken de Ieie!" (Japanese: 夏と恋と冒険でイエイッ!)	August 20, 2011
The final chapter of the Summer Saga. After Ruby and the gang obtained the Rainbow Jewel, they then received a call from Kanon back from Dragon Land, saying that everything has gone worse since they left. As they went back to Dragon Land, they found out that something is wrong and the Dragon Prince saw one of the injured Royal Guards. Meanwhile, Hinata, Garnet and Labra came into her room and she and Aqua explained everything. Professor Utsuborg took over the kingdom and wants to force the Princess to marry him, so he can take over Dragon Land.
21	"Triple Axel Yay! / Homework Pinch Yay!"; Transliteration: "Toripuru Akuseru de Ieie! / Shukudai Pinchi de Ieie!" (Japanese: トリプルアクセルでイエイッ! / 宿題ピンチでイエイッ!)	August 27, 2011
Triple Axel Yay!: A strange man is eyeing Peridot after their adventures in Dragon Land and then met her later on in the dormitory. Sapphie explained that he is a professional ice skater in the Human World and he wants Peridot to be an ice skater due to her agility and skills. Later on competing in the Ice Skating Championships in Jewel Land. Homework Pinch Yay!: The others were having a hard time finishing their homework due to their adventure in Dragon Land. They all ask Hinata to help them finish their summer homework, but then rejected. Kanon and the Jewelpets decides to do everything they know to convince Hinata to do their homework.
22	"Shouko and Master Yay! / Garnet and Masago Yay!"; Transliteration: "Shōko to Masutā ga Ieie! / Gānetto to Masago ga Ieie!" (Japanese: 晶子とマスターがイェイッ! / ガーネットと真砂がイェイッ!)	September 3, 2011
Shouko and Master Yay!: Master saved Shouko from an accident and she started to have strange affections with him. Despite being an old man, Shouko herself is having a hard time confessing her feelings to him, as she starts to work as a maid at the Strawberry Cafe. Garnet and Masago Yay!: Both Garnet and Masago agree to go on a date. Later that night, he explained to Mikage about his lucky day and how Garnet answered him yes. His friends agreed to help Masago, only to find out it wasn't the date he was expecting.
23	"That's Terrible Yay! / Double Secret Diary Yay!"; Transliteration: "Sun-goi are de Ieie! / Naisho no futari-kkiri de Ieie!" (Japanese: すンごいアレでイェイッ! / ナイショの二人っきりイェイッ!)	September 10, 2011
That's Terrible Yay!: For unknown reasons, everyone's Jewel Pods are starting to malfunction all of a sudden. Jewelina explained that the malfunction is due to the strange clouds filled with Dark Jewel Magic surrounding Jewel Land. Ruby and her friends decides to find the source of it and stop the Dark Magic from plunging Jewel Land into an eternal winter. Double Secret Diary Yay!: Kanon is still saddened and mad on how Ruby is with Mikage all the time. Being driven by jealousy, she then meets Mikage after school and tried to talk to him about their relationships, while being locked inside the storage room. But when Ruby heard Kanon confess to Mikage that she loved him and asked him out, she felt crushed.
24	"O-Le! Tour Yay! / With Yaginuma Yay!"; Transliteration: "O re! Tōru Ieie! / Yaginuma-kun to Ieie!" (Japanese: オ・レ!トールイェイッ! / 八木沼くんとイェイッ!)	September 17, 2011
O-Le! Tour Yay!: After hearing the conversation inside the storage room, Ruby felt crushed on how Kanon is in love with Mikage. The next day, Ruby isn't feeling well on what happened on that time nor can't bear the things she said to him. But until she met her childhood friend Tour, the love triangle between her, Kanon and Mikage became a lot messier. With Yaginuma Yay!: Yaginuma has been transformed into a real life goat, while King and his lackeys find something that could overthrow the Sunshine Academy.
25	"Tears in the Rain Yay!"; Transliteration: "Ame ni Utaeba Ieie!" (Japanese: 雨にうたえばイェイッ!)	September 24, 2011
The Jewelpets watch Dian performing on television, while Garnet is burning up with passion in her desire to perform on stage. Later on during the auditions, Garnet does her best but the judges pick Diana instead. Both Jewelpets have a little talk about each other before they part ways. The next day, Garnet does not get accepted again in the auditions. When she was about to go home, she helped Dian by fixing his attire while giving out her name to him.
26	"Stress Explosion of Love Yay! / Party Debut Yay!"; Transliteration: "Koi no Sutoresu Dai Bakuhatsu Ieie! / Gō kon debyū de Ieie!" (Japanese: 恋のストレス大爆発イェイッ! / 合コンデビューでイェイッ!)	October 1, 2011
Stress Explosion of Love Yay!: Kanon is very lucky due to her getting closer to Mikage, although she can't confess her feelings to him. Ruby is still jealous of her and insists on getting Mikage back. Even worse, Tour is still in love with Ruby and wants her. Party Debut Yay!: The Jewelpets of Plum Section are invited to the karaoke party hosted by Kaiya. Ruby notices Yuku's strange behavior during the party, until she finds out he wants to marry her. His grandparents explain that Yuku is an artist, and he wants Ruby as his model.
27	"It's the Sports Festival! Yay!"; Transliteration: "Taiiku-sai! Ieie!" (Japanese: 体育祭だよ!イェイッ!)	October 8, 2011
The Sports Festival has finally come in Sunshine Academy and Iruka wants the students to participate, somewhat not knowing about Jill's plans. As the day of the Sports Festival arrives, both Plum Section and Rose Section must fight their honor. When each team fights it out during the festival, the Rose Section is taking the lead, while the students in the Plum Section were doing their best to beat them.
28	"Double Date Yay! / Girl Talk Yay!" (Japanese: ダブルデートでイェイッ！ / ガールズトークでイェイッ！)	October 15, 2011
Double Date Yay!: Kanon, Ruby, Mikage and Tour go on a double date in town. Both Ruby and Kanon decided to do everything they could on their date while trying to win Mikage's heart again. Meanwhile, Iruka is trying to impress Jill again on their first date. Girl Talk Yay!: The girls talk about the date between Mikage and Kanon, as well as everything else. Due to the spiked cupcakes the girls ate, they tell every random feelings they have.
29	"Poorly-Tasted Omelet Yay! / Ruby and Kanon Yay! Part 1"; Transliteration: "Tamago-yaki wa Furyō no Aji Ieie! / Rubī ga Kanon de Ieie! Zenpen" (Japanese: 玉子焼きは不良の味イェイッ！ / ルビーが花音でイェイッ！前編)	October 22, 2011
Poorly Tasted Omelet Yay!: Charlotte remembers the day when she first met both Shouko and Waniyama in Sunshine Academy. Everyone tastes the omelet she made. Ruby and Kanon Yay! Part 1: Due to an accident, both Ruby and Kanon's minds have been switched from their bodies. Now being inside Kanon's body, Ruby had her chance to get Mikage for herself. However, how will Kanon temporarily adapt inside a Jewelpet's body? And will there be a way to switch their minds back?
30	"Look Behind You Yay! / Ruby and Kanon Yay! Part 2"; Transliteration: "Hora anata no ushiro ni Ieie! / Rubī ga kanon de Ieie! Kōhen" (Japanese: ほらあなたの後ろにイェイッ! / ルビーが花音でイェイッ！後編)	October 29, 2011
Look Behind You Yay!: Sapphie herself is being suspicious on Iruka's assistants. Feeling curious, she consulted her friends to see what is really going on with their homeroom teacher. Ruby and Kanon Yay! Part 2: Part 2 of the last story. Ruby (in Kanon's body) received tickets from Titana about a theme park in Jewel Land for her and Mikage's date. However, Kanon (in Ruby's body) is becoming more jealous on the Jewelpet flirting with him.
31	"Disappearing Jewel Bread Yay! / M-kage of the Rose Yay! Part 1"; Transliteration: "Maboroshi no Jueru pan de Ieie! / Bara no M-kage Ieie! Zenpen" (Japanese: 幻のジュエルパンでイェイッ! / 薔薇のM-kageイェイッ! 前編)	November 5, 2011
Disappearing Jewel Bread Yay!: The Sunshine Academy has a new kind of bread being sold in the cafeteria called the Jewel Bread. Because of its popularity, it was bought fast by the students due to its taste and design. Ruby and her friends wanted the bread as well and will do everything to buy it, only finding out it is difficult to buy the whole thing despite their efforts. M-kage of the Rose Yay! Part 1: A masked man who resembles Mikage is chased by the police, holding a melon. The name of the person is Phantom M-Kage and he is targeted by King and his lackeys. He then meet Sango in the streets that night, and she starts to fell in love with him.
32	"Baby Plum Section Yay! / M-kage of the Rose Yay! Part 2"; Transliteration: "Ume-gumi Beibī Ieie! / Bara no M-kage Ieie! Kōhen" (Japanese: 梅組ベイビーイェイッ! / 薔薇のM-kageイェイッ! 後編)	November 12, 2011
Baby Plum Section Yay!: One afternoon in the girl's dormitory, Labra doesn't like to be called a baby and uses her magic, transforming Ruby and her friends into babies. Kanon, Angela, and Hinata now need to take care of them, while trying to convince Labra to turn them back to normal. M-kage of the Rose Yay! Part 2: Ruby and Kanon receive a note from M-Kage, saying that he will come to their dormitory to kidnap Ruby. One of their classmates come and warn them about Phantom M-Kage and another case of the Dark Jewel Power surrounding him, explaining why Mikage is absent in the previous days. Later on, M-Kage arrives to their room and tries to kidnap Ruby until he is caught red-handed by the duo.
33	"Suit up! Jewel Shoes Yay! / Flora's Farm Yay!"; Transliteration: "Bakusō! Jueru Shūzu de Ieie! / Furōra no Bokujō de Ieie!" (Japanese: 爆走! ジュエルシューズでイェイッ! / フローラの牧場でイェイッ!)	November 19, 2011
Suit up! Jewel Shoes Yay!: It's almost the end of Autumn and Hinata has a problem catching up with Peridot. But when Peridot turned herself into a pair of shoes to increase Hinata's athletic abilities, the other Jewelpet Friends goes with the trend and turns themselves into clothing wear! Kanon herself may use to this chance to get closer to Mikage. Flora's Pasture Yay!: Kanon and her friends went to the Cream Pasture for a field trip with Flora joining them. Both Fluola and Angela became friends at the farm, while Labra starts to become jealous.
34	"It's a Musical! Yay!"; Transliteration: "Myūjikaru da yo! Ieie!" (Japanese: ミュージカルだよ! イェイッ!)	November 26, 2011
It's the Sunshine Academy Autumn Festival and the Plum Section were hosting a musical play called "Cats and Dogs" as one of the venues. The President of Sunshine Newspaper wants everything to go smoothly after all the hard times and countless amounts of practice the actors had done. However, Kanon's mother is not pleased when she sees on how both Kanon and Mikage are together in the play.
35	"Tour's Secret Yay! / Goodbye, Kanon Yay! Part 1"; Transliteration: "Tōru no himitsu Ieie! / Sayonara Kanon Ieie! Zenpen" (Japanese: トールのひみつイェイッ! / さよなら花音イェイッ! 前編)	December 3, 2011
Tour's Secret Yay!: Ruby and the others were checking the Ratings Board in the Sunshine Academy lobby for their initial grades until they saw that Tour is in the 100th place, being the one who got the lowest. Sango decides to consult with Sapphie to uncover a lot of secrets regarding Tour's failing grades. Goodbye, Kanon Yay! Part 1: Kanon is pulled out of the Sunshine Academy due to her mother finding out she is hanging out with Mikage. The students of the Plum Section arrange a farewell party for her on her departure to Jewel Land back to the Human World, making her friends cry. That night, both Kanon and Mikage have a little talk outside the dormitory. However, when Kanon finds out that she has to leave Jewel Land by tomorrow, her spirit is crushed. The next day, after she truly confesses her love for Mikage, he accepts it and both of them run away together.
36	"Jugempet! / Goodbye, Kanon Yay! Part 2"; Transliteration: "Jugemupetto de Uhyoi! / Sayonara Kanon Ieie! Kōhen" (Japanese: ジュゲムペットでウヒョイッ! / さよなら花音イェイッ! 後編)	December 10, 2011
Jugempet!: Christmas is coming and everyone is preparing for the holidays by making their gifts to their friends. However, strange fake clones of Ruby's friends called Jugempets started to appear out of nowhere, replacing her friends little by little. Hinata noticed that it was the work of Dark Jewel Magic. Goodbye, Kanon Yay! Part 2: In the last episode, both Mikage and Kanon run away and end up somewhere in Jewel Land. Unknowingly, Titana snuck himself inside Kanon's bag until his cover is blown, making her angry at him. Ruby, Labra, and Peridot are still looking for the couple as Ruby is dead mad due to Kanon hugging Mikage. However, Kanon and Mikage start to feel something special, while Titana tries to forcefully separate them. The next day, Kanon's mother is disappointed at Kanon due to disobeying her orders and dating Mikage.
37	"Year In, Year Out Yay!"; Transliteration: "Yukutoshi, Kurutoshi Ieie!" (Japanese: ゆく年くる年イェイッ!)	December 17, 2011
Next year will be the Year of the Dragon, but Ruby is worrying about her luck. After a lot of attempts, Opal's wings suddenly darkened and starts to shrink due to Ruby's ambition and it broke her heart. Things go worse as both Ruby and Opal argue with each other.
38	"Sweetspet Yay! / Holy Light's Prayer Yay!"; Transliteration: "Suwītsupetto de Ieie! / Seiya no Inori Ieie!" (Japanese: スウィーツペットでイェイッ! / 聖夜の祈りイェイッ!)	December 24, 2011
Sweetspet Yay!: Sakuran, a Sweetspet who hails from Sweets Land, comes to Jewel Land to deliver gifts. But then she is surprisingly greeted by Ruby and her Friends, thinking it was Santa. Ruby later learns that she is still a newbie on being Santa, and delivers utter chaos during Christmas Eve. Ruby and her friends decide to help her deliver the gifts all over Jewel Land. Holy Light's Prayer Yay!: Everyone in Jewel Land go to the church to pray for their good fortunes and wishes, not knowing that Jewelina is keeping her eye on each one of them.
39	"Duo in the Wilderness Yay!"; Transliteration: "Kōya no Futari Ieie!" (Japanese: 荒野の二人イェイッ!)	December 31, 2011
In an unknown place, Labra and Angela spend their time together as Labra tries to discover her own true power Jewelina said to her. The next morning, when Labra found out they're all out of supplies, she then cries loudly, causing magical shockwaves that almost decimated the area. Angela agrees that they resupply and continue their travels, not knowing that the police are in their tail.
40	"Everything Freezes Yay!"; Transliteration: "Minna Kocchatte Ieie!" (Japanese: みんな凍っちゃってイェイッ!)	January 7, 2012
Kanon and Ruby notice the icy cold turns everything into ice due to the Jewel Land Aurora occurring in the whole land. The next day, everything in Jewel Land is frozen solid in ice and both sides enjoy the cold weather. As the blizzard continues, everything has gone worse as the aurora expands and everyone in Jewel Land, turning everyone into ice one by one.
41	"Labra's Trial Yay! / Mikage's Secret Yay!"; Transliteration: "Rabura no Shiren Ieie! / Himitsu no Mikage-kun Ieie!" (Japanese: ラブラの試練イェイッ! / ひみつの御影くんイェイッ!)	January 14, 2012
Labra's Trial Yay!: For Labra to keep up with her magical powers, she has to take a special magic trial from Jewelina herself. However, Luna also wants to take the test as well as both Jewelpets compete to see who is the strongest. At the end, Jewelina gave both Jewelpets two magic mirrors to test their magical abilities further. When Luna goes missing, Labra learns a shocking truth on where she is. Mikage's Secret Yay!: Kanon gets troubled as she is not allowed to be near Mikage all the time. Because of this, she decided to send Titana to the human world to spy on his home, and reveal this secret and take it back to Kanon. However, Kanon learns the shocking truth about her and Mikage.
42	"Angela of the Wind Yay!"; Transliteration: "Kaze no Enjera Ieie!" (Japanese: 風のエンジェライェイッ!)	January 21, 2012
Shouko and Angela are in the Moto GP racing. However, Shouko kidnaps Angela first in their dormitory and disappear somewhere in the human world. The Jewelpets and Hinata are shocked about this until the found out the truth as Angela and Shouko won the bike race. Later on, both Shouko and Angela decide to go to the Human World to compete for the Moto GP Race.
43	"Hinata's Dreams Yay!"; Transliteration: "Hinata no Yume ga Ieie!" (Japanese: ひなたの夢がイェイッ!)	January 28, 2012
Hinata dreams on becoming a nursery teacher after she graduates from college. Peridot understands Hinata's story well until she was called by her friends. Later on, Hinata met up with Kanon, and the two talk about entering to a university after they graduate. When Hinata grows up, decided to study in the Sunshine Academy in Jewel Land so she can meet her father again.
44	"A Star is Born Yay!"; Transliteration: "Sutā Tanjō de Ieie!" (Japanese: スタア誕生でイェイッ!)	February 4, 2012
Masago is starting to have deep feelings to Garnet. In order for him to get close to her and admit his feeling to the Feline Jewelpet, he decides to join a film contest along with his classmates so he can be close to her. He chooses Garnet to be the star of the film for her to be famous like Nyanjelina. During the film shooting, Masago does his best to direct the most romantic film for their entry to the contest, while there are a lot of chaos and disagreement with the students on their chosen roles.
45	"It's Valentine's Day! Yay!"; Transliteration: "Barentain da yo! Ieie!" (Japanese: バレンタインだよ!イェイッ!)	February 11, 2012
In the Sunshine Academy, the students are instructed on making Valentine chocolates for Valentine's Day. However, Ruby and Kanon were going head to head with each other to create the perfect chocolate for their crush, Mikage. Somehow, hilarity ensures and Kanon always failed on her chocolates. Ruby decides to help her but the same time, Kanon remembered something about her and Mikage when they were kids.
46	"Forbidden Love Yay!"; Transliteration: "Kindan no Koi de Ieie!" (Japanese: 禁断の恋でイェイッ!)	February 18, 2012
18 years ago, the twins were born during the storm in the Shiraishi Household. However, their grandmother discovered that one of them is a cursed child, bearing a strange spiral birthmark and they must be separated. Kanon feels crushed on what she heard from her mother and runs away and Mikage himself can't believe that he has a twin sister, and it was right beside him all the time.
47	"When you Wish upon a Star... Yay!"; Transliteration: "Hoshi ni negai wo... Ieie!" (Japanese: 星に願いを... イェイッ!)	February 25, 2012
Sapphie has a dream to be the first Jewelpet to reach the outer space and beyond, but it is not easy for her. One day in the Sunshine Academy, Sapphie goes to NASA and applies to be the first Jewelpet Astronaut, as her friends are preparing a party for her acceptance. However, Sapphie was never accepted and instead became a new mascot for NASA, in which she rejects. Feeling depressed, Garnet and Nejikawa will both do something for her in order for her dreams to be fulfilled.
48	"Create an Album Yay!"; Transliteration: "Arubamu-tsukuri de Ieie!" (Japanese: アルバム作りでイェイッ!)	March 3, 2012
Iruka tells the students in the Plum section to do a class album. As Peridot shows all of her taken pictures from all of their adventures, the whole class relive their moments on those times, either good or bad but they are not enough for the album. The whole class decided to take pictures of themselves, reliving their moments on what happened a year ago.
49	"Call me Dark Queen! Yay!"; Transliteration: "Dājo-sama to Oyobi! Ieie!" (Japanese: ダージョ様とおよび！ イェイッ！)	March 10, 2012
Jewel Land is again under attack by clouds of Dark Jewel Magic. Meanwhile, Ruby herself in seeing the flowers bloom along with her friends, until they start to discuss about Jewelina. Their housemaid became angry until her cover is blown, revealing Jewelina. Even worse, the clouds of Dark Jewel Magic gets stronger and finally affect Jewelina herself, turning her into the Dark Queen. She is starting to eradicate all women, who are much more beautiful than her and causing complete chaos towards the land.
50	"Dark Jewel War Yay!"; Transliteration: "Dāku Jewel taisen de Ieie!" (Japanese: ダークジュエル大戦でイェイッ!)	March 17, 2012
In the first battle against Mecha Garnet and Mecha Sango, Garnet and Sango fight on their best but Sango got the upper hand. On the other hand, Kanon, Titana, and Iruka are going all around Jewel Land to see if they can find a clue for them to defeat the Dark Jewel Magic. Back at the academy, Sango lost but Garnet's robot is defeated by Nyanjelina until Mikage (as M-Kage) appeared and charmed Nyanjelina, only to be zapped by the Dark Queen.
51	"Ruby's Ring Yay!"; Transliteration: "Rubī no yubiwa Ieie!" (Japanese: ルビーの指輪イェイッ！)	March 24, 2012
After the Dark Queen's attempt to freeze everyone, she then kidnaps M-Kage and takes her to the Dark Jewel Castle leaving Ruby heartbroken. However, in a last-ditch effort, Dark Queen fires a blast that could kill them, but Ruby blocks it with her body, severely injuring her while sending the three away from the castle.
52	"Graduation Ceremony! Yay!"; Transliteration: "Sotsugyō shikida yo! Ieie!" (Japanese: 卒業式だよ！イェイッ！)	March 31, 2012
As both Mikage and Kanon cry over Ruby's death, the twins both remember their past for the last time. It also reveals everything on how Mikage and Ruby met and the love triangle started. 5 years later, everyone goes to their separate ways, having their own jobs. Even throughout all the hardships in the academy, Ruby's dreams have been fulfilled with the man of her dreams.
