= List of Jewelpet episodes =

- Volume 1 DVD of the First Series, showing the main heroines Rinko, Ruby, Garnet and Sapphie.
- No. of episodes: 52

Release
- Original network: TV Tokyo, TV Osaka
- Original release: April 5, 2009 – March 28, 2010

Series chronology
- Next → Jewelpet Twinkle☆

Jewelpet (Japanese: ジュエルペット, Hepburn: Juerupetto) is the first Jewelpet anime series created by Sanrio and Sega and animated by Studio Comet, directed by Nanako Sasaki. The series first aired between April 5, 2009, and March 28, 2010, on TV Osaka and TV Tokyo, replacing Onegai My Melody Kirara in its initial timeslot.

The series focuses on Rinko Kōgyoku and her Jewelpet partner Ruby collecting all the lost Jewelpets who were scattered in Takaragaseki City on Earth and foiling the plans of the Evil Dark Magic user Diana. As the series unfolds, the main heroines uncover new Jewelpets on their way while new relationships were being built through the characters. Near the half of the season, Dian, another Jewelpet who can use Dark Magic awakens from his Jewel Charm State. And now the heroes have to face him and the havoc and chaos that will be caused in both Jewel Land and the Human World.

The series' music is composed by Shiro Hamaguchi. The opening theme is "Really? Seriously! Magical Jewel" (マジ？マジ！マジカル☆ジュエル, Maji? Maji! Majikaru☆Jueru) by Yui Asaka while the ending theme is "The Smile's Loop" (笑顔のループ, Egao no Rūpu) by Mitsuko Horie.

== Episode list ==
No.	Title	Original release date
1	"Sparkling: Here Comes The Jewel"; Transliteration: "Kira-kira ☆ Hōseki ga Futte Kita" (Japanese: キラキラ☆宝石が降ってきた)	April 5, 2009
A rabbit Jewelpet named Ruby wanders off while the other Jewelpets are turned into jewels. However, during the pelican's delivery, a strange gust of wind blew him away, causing the Jewel Charms scattered into the Human World. For Ruby's punishment, she must collect them back or else she cannot return to Jewel Land. Meanwhile, a girl named Rinko Kōgyoku finds Ruby's Charm and informed her friend. The next day, the girls enter the jewelry store to examine the jewel, only to be caught into a robbery. They were saved by a boy named Keigo Tatewaki who saw the red jewel Rinko has. Keigo explained to them that he was working for a special organization which is linked to the great magicians of Jewel Land. Rinko accepted the offer to gather all Jewelpets back to Jewel Land and awakened Ruby using the Jewel Pocketbook. Rinko tries to use Ruby's failed courage magic and causes an explosion.
2	"Heart-pounding: I Want To Confess"; Transliteration: "Dokidoki ♡ Kokuhaku Shitai no" (Japanese: ドキドキ♡告白したいの)	April 12, 2009
When a crying Minami cannot confess to Miyamato, Garnet's Jewel Charm appears and they turn her back into a pet. She refuses to use her love magic for Minami and runs away. Rinko, Ruby and Minami eventually found Garnet before telling her to use magic, to which the latter agrees as Miyamoto eats okonomiyaki.
3	"Bye Bye, Arisugawa-san" (Japanese: バイバイ（>_<）有栖川さん)	April 19, 2009
Rinko and Minami attempt to befriend Aoi Arisugawa, their wealthy classmate, only to go wrong as Ruby and Garnet scatter around the mansion to find Sapphie. The Jewelpets are kicked out of the mansion, with Aoi believing that Rinko refused to befriend her. At school, Rinko is informed that Aoi will move to England and live there permanently. They escape school with Tatewaki's guidance to prevent Aoi from leaving. Reaching the airport, Rinko tries to tell Arisugawa that she wants to be friends, and Sapphie's Jewel Charm appears as they shake hands. Weeks after, Aoi revealed that she just went to England to stay with her friend for a while.
4	"Sip Sip: Full of Love"; Transliteration: "Tsurutsuru ♡ Aijō ippai" (Japanese: ツルツル♡愛情いっぱい)	April 26, 2009
Rinko, Minami, and Aoi visit Rako whose father owns a ramen restaurant. At night, Diana, a cat Jewelpet who wields Dark Magic, puts a spell on their store to shoo people away. The next day at school, the three girls notice a depressed Rako sitting, telling them that her father's restaurant turned empty as people were disgusted with the ramen. They try to make a different recipe and cook ramen, only to fail both missions. Suddenly, the restaurant is under hostage by Diana's trio, but their own plan backfires as they try to attack, fleeing by themselves. Rako's father realizes that the ramen was dedicated to her deceased mother, who loved their family. When her summoned Rin's Jewel Charm, Rako makes a random sketch to which Rin bursts in laughter, so does her spell.
5	"Burn Burn! Refreshing Swordsmanship"; Transliteration: "Meramera! Sawayaka Kenpō" (Japanese: メラメラ！さわやか剣法)	May 3, 2009
6	"Chitty Chitty! Duel at the Pier"; Transliteration: "Chikichiki! Kutō no Kettō" (Japanese: チキチキ！埠頭の決闘)	May 10, 2009
7	"Mukimuki! Servant of Seven Wounds"; Transliteration: "Mukimuki! Nanatsu no Kizu o Motsu Shitsuji" (Japanese: ムキムキ！七つの傷を持つ執事)	May 3, 2009
8	"Atsuatsu: Rinko's Emerald Tears"; Transliteration: "Atsuatsu: Rinko no Namida wa Emerarudo" (Japanese: アツアツ♡りんこの涙はエメラルド)	May 24, 2009
9	"Puripuri: You Want to be Active"; Transliteration: "Puripuri: Bu-tsukushiku Naritai No" (Japanese: プリプリ ブつくしくなりたいの)	May 31, 2009
10	"Paopao! Twins Adventure"; Transliteration: "Paopao! Tsuinzu Adobenchā" (Japanese: パオパオ！ツインズ・アドベンチャー)	June 7, 2009
11	"Ikeike! Prime Minister Secretary Keigo Tatewaki"; Transliteration: "Ikeike! Sōri Daijin Shuseki Hishokan Keigo Tatewaki" (Japanese: イケイケ！総理大臣主席秘書官帯刀啓吾)	June 14, 2009
12	"No No... The Prince Who Lost His Dream"; Transliteration: "Damedame... Yume o Nakushita Ōji-sama" (Japanese: ダメダメ 夢をなくした王子様)	June 21, 2009
13	"Seriously!? Rinko is Taitō's Girlfriend?"; Transliteration: "Majimaji!? Taitō no Kanojo wa Rinko?" (Japanese: マジマジ！？帯刀の彼女はりんこ？)	June 28, 2009
14	"Hello Hello? Who is Diana?"; Transliteration: "Moshimoshi? Daiana Itte Nanimono!?" (Japanese: モシモシ？ダイアナって何者！？)	July 5, 2009
15	"Dana Dana! Model, Can You Meet Him!?"; Transliteration: "Dana Dana! Moderu no Kare ni Aeru kana!?" (Japanese: だナだナ！モデルの彼に会えるかナ！？)	July 12, 2009
16	"Kari Kari! I Dislike the Transfer Student"; Transliteration: "Kari Kari! Ki ni iranai Tenkōsei" (Japanese: カリカリ！気にいらない転校生)	July 19, 2009
17	"Where? Discover Diana"; Transliteration: "Dokodoko? Daiana o Mitsukedase" (Japanese: ドコドコ？ダイアナを見つけ出せ)	July 26, 2009
18	"Exciting! Summer Vacation in Jewel Land"; Transliteration: "Wakuwaku! Jueru Rando de Natsuyasumi" (Japanese: ワクワク！ジュエルランドで夏休み)	August 2, 2009
19	"Mini Mini! Diana and the Herb Thieves"; Transliteration: "Mini-mini! Daiana to Hābu-dan" (Japanese: ミニミニ！ダイアナとハーブ団)	August 9, 2009
20	"Peach Peach: Operation Love Beach"; Transliteration: "Pichipichi: Rabu Bīchi Daisakusen" (Japanese: ピチピチ♡ラブビーチ大作戦)	August 16, 2009
21	"Ora Ora! Tearaway Legend"; Transliteration: "Ora Ora! Abarenbō Densetsu" (Japanese: オラオラ！暴れん坊伝説)	August 23, 2009
22	"Crackling: Rinko vs. Akira"; Transliteration: "Bachibachi: Rinko vs. Akira" (Japanese: バチバチ☆りんこvs晃)	August 30, 2009
23	"Are Are? Where did you go, Ruby!?"; Transliteration: "Are Are? Doko e itta no rubī!?" (Japanese: アレアレ？どこへ行ったのルビー！？)	September 6, 2009
24	"What? What? Jewel Stick!?"; Transliteration: "Nani Nani? Jueru Sutekki!?" (Japanese: ナニナニ？ジュエルステッキ！？)	September 13, 2009
25	"Yada Yada! The Targeted Jewel Pocketbook"; Transliteration: "Yada Yada! Nerawareta Jueru Techō" (Japanese: ヤダヤダ！ねらわれたジュエル手帳)	September 20, 2009
26	"Purupuru! Rinko's Miracle Power"; Transliteration: "Purupuru! Rinko no Mirakuru Pawā" (Japanese: プルプル！りんこのミラクルパワー)	September 27, 2009
27	"Tingling! Studying in Jewel Land"; Transliteration: "Norinori! Jueru Rando de o Benkyō" (Japanese: ノリノリ！ジュエルランドでお勉強)	October 4, 2009
28	"Like Like: Rinko's Prince"; Transliteration: "Suki Suki: Rinko no Ōji-sama" (Japanese: スキスキ♡りんこの王子様)	October 11, 2009
29	"Chancy!? Diana's Revival"; Transliteration: "Yabayaba!? Daiana ga Fukkatsu" (Japanese: ヤバヤバ！？ダイアナが復活)	October 18, 2009
30	"Round and Round: The Day When Sushi Belt Stood Still"; Transliteration: "Kurukuru: Kaiten Sushi ga Seishi suru Hi" (Japanese: クルクル 回転寿司が静止する日)	October 25, 2009
31	"Sick Sick... Epidemic God Señorita"; Transliteration: "Shikushiku... Ojōsama wa Yakubyōgami" (Japanese: シクシク お嬢様は疫病神)	November 1, 2009
32	"Burn! Diana's Final Battle"; Transliteration: "Meramera! Daiana to Saishū Kessen" (Japanese: メラメラ！ダイアナと最終決戦)	November 8, 2009
33	"Deta Deta! New Enemy, Dian"; Transliteration: "Detadeta! Aratana Teki Dian" (Japanese: デタデタ！新たな敵ディアン)	November 15, 2009
34	"Hi Hi! The Big Baby Runaway"; Transliteration: "Haihai! Akachan Dai Bōsō" (Japanese: ハイハイ！赤ちゃん大暴走)	November 22, 2009
35	"Dasu Dasu! King's Traveling Heart"; Transliteration: "Dasudasu! Kingu Kokoro no Tabi" (Japanese: ダスダス！キング心の旅)	November 29, 2009
36	"He Came: Rinko's Prince!?"; Transliteration: "Kitakita: Rinko no Ōji-sama!?" (Japanese: キタキタ: りんこの王子様！？)	December 6, 2009
37	"Oooh: Three New Girls' Popularity Spikes"; Transliteration: "Ufu-ufu ♡ Shinzōnin Musume Ninkikyū Jōshō" (Japanese: うふうふ♡新三人娘人気急上昇)	December 13, 2009
38	"Merry Merry: Santa Comes to Town"; Transliteration: "Merimeri: Santa ga Machi ni Yattekita" (Japanese: メリメリ☆サンタが街にやってきた)	December 20, 2009
39	"Babubabu! A Jewelpet is Born"; Transliteration: "Babubabu! Juerupetto Tanjō" (Japanese: バブバブ！ジュエルペット誕生)	December 27, 2009
40	"Exciting!? Happy First Dream Mayhem"; Transliteration: "Ukiuki!? Happī Hatsuyume Ōsōdō" (Japanese: ウキウキ！？ハッピー初夢大騒動)	January 3, 2010
41	"Fall Out: Prince who Rid on the White Horse"; Transliteration: "Meromero: Hakuba ni Notta Ōji-sama" (Japanese: メロメロ♡白馬に乗った王子様)	January 10, 2010
42	"Hurry Hurry! School Ghost"; Transliteration: "Buruburu! Gakkō no Kaidan" (Japanese: ブルブル！学校の怪談)	January 17, 2010
43	"Oro-oro! The Trial of Witches"; Transliteration: "Oro-oro! Majo-tachi no Shirei" (Japanese: オロオロ！魔女たちの試練)	January 24, 2010
44	"Suspenseful! Today is the Last Day of Humanity?"; Transliteration: "Harahara! Kyō ga Jinrui Saigo no Hi?" (Japanese: ハラハラ！今日が人類最後の日？)	January 31, 2010
45	"Oh No! Everyone has Become Kings"; Transliteration: "Iya-iya! Minna Kingu ni Nacchatta" (Japanese: イヤイヤ！みんなキングになっちゃった)	February 7, 2010
46	"Love Love!? Valentine Magic"; Transliteration: "Raburabu!? Valentine Majikku" (Japanese: ラブラブ！？バレンタインマジック)	February 14, 2010
47	"Age Age! Operation Proposal"; Transliteration: "Age-age! Puropōzu Daisakusen" (Japanese: アゲアゲ！プロポーズ大作戦)	February 21, 2010
48	"Uru-uru: Wedding of Sorrow"; Transliteration: "Uru-uru: Kanashimi no Kekkonshiki" (Japanese: ウルウル 悲しみの結婚式)	March 7, 2010
49	"Biribiri! Dian vs. The Four Witches"; Transliteration: "Biribiri! Dian vs. Yonin no Majo" (Japanese: ビリビリ！ディアンVS四人の魔女)	March 14, 2010
50	"Hooray Hooray! We are Together Even Our Hearts are Away"; Transliteration: "Furefure! Hanarete ite mo Kokoro wa Issho" (Japanese: フレフレ！離れていても心は一緒)	March 21, 2010
51	"Vivid: They Come Back"; Transliteration: "Buibui: Kaettekita Aitsura" (Japanese: ブイブイ 帰ってきたアイツら)	March 22, 2010
52	"Kiss Kiss: Jewelpets are Friends"; Transliteration: "Kisu Kisu: Juerupetto wa Tomodachi" (Japanese: キスキス♡ジュエルペットは友達)	March 28, 2010
