= List of Jewelpet Twinkle episodes =

- DVD cover of Jewelpet Twinkle fan disc
- No. of episodes: 53

Release
- Original network: TV Tokyo, TV Osaka
- Original release: April 3, 2010 – April 2, 2011

Series chronology
- ← Previous; Jewelpet Next → Jewelpet Sunshine

Jewelpet Twinkle (Japanese: ジュエルペットトゥインクル, Hepburn: Juerupetto Tuinkuru) is the second Jewelpet anime created by Sanrio and Sega and animated by Studio Comet, announced in Shogakukan's Pucchigumi magazine and directed by Takashi Yamamoto. It premiered from April 3, 2010, to April 2, 2011, on TV Tokyo and TV Osaka. The series premiered later in Spain as part of the Boing programming block. Jewelpet Twinkle is the first series to have critical appeal outside the series' target demographic, particularly in the dōjin community due to the character designs and series's story plot.

The series focuses on Akari Sakura, who first met Ruby on the beach on her way to school. Initially, Akari cannot understand her due to her Jewel Land language, but Ruby eats a special candy so she can speak and understand human language. As the day passes, Ruby knows about her problems in school and later apologized, saying that she did not know Akari's personal problems as she tries to cheer her up. Later, a Jewel Charm appears on her hand and Akari realizes that she was chosen by Ruby to be her partner. Afterwards, Akari decides to become a student in Jewel Land along with Ruby as they are aiming to collect 12 Jewel Stones get into the Jewel Star Grand Prix.

The series' music is composed by famous Video Game Composer Shiro Hamaguchi like the first series. Two songs were made for both the Opening and Ending themes of the series. The opening theme is "Happy Twinkle" (Happy トゥインクル, Happy Tuinkuru) by former AKB48 member Kayano Masuyama featuring Ayaka Saito and Miyuki Sawashiro, as both Ruby and Labra. The ending theme titled "Scribbling at the Sky" (空ニラクガキ, Sora ni Rakugaki) by Natsumi Takamori, Ayana Taketatsu, and Azusa Kataoka as Akari, Miria, and Sara respectively.

Nippon Columbia publishes several DVD volumes of Jewelpet Twinkle during the series' broadcast. Frontier Works also released it as a DVD Box set on July 22, 2011. Fan Discs were also released due to the show's popularity in Comiket, each containing some episodes and bonus extras. The first was released on September 9, 2011, Fan Disc F, which includes a special version of the Opening Video of the anime, was released on January 16, 2012, and a Blu-ray fan disc that contains a special song titled "The spell of smiles (Everyone's Smiles)" (ほほえみの呪文 ～みんな笑顔になぁれ～, Hohoemi no jumon: Minna Egao ni Nāre) was released on September 9, 2012, with a Limited Edition released on August 10, 2012. A Blu-ray box set was released on July 21, 2013, which includes an OVA episode, a second official soundtrack, and an illustration booklet containing official illustrations and promotional images from the series.

== Episode list ==
No.	Title	Original release date
1	"Ruby and Akari Dokki-doki!"; Transliteration: "Rubī to Akari de Dokki-doki!" (Japanese: ルビーとあかりでドッキ☆ドキ！)	April 3, 2010
Ruby, a Japanese hare Jewelpet, has come to the famous Magic Academy to study. Her entrance exam is to find a human whose feelings in her heart matches hers. In the Human World, an 11-year-old middle school student named Akari Sakura is going to school on her first day. When Ruby takes Akari to Jewel Land, both of them become students at the Magic Academy.
2	"The Jewel of your Dreams Dokki-doki!"; Transliteration: "Yumemiru Jueru de Dokki-doki!" (Japanese: 夢みるジュエルでドッキ☆ドキ！)	April 10, 2010
Akari transfers to the Magic Academy and learns that time in the human world will stop while she is in Jewel Land. In Jewel Land, she meets the fashionable Miria as well as the prince-like Leon who teach her about the jewel stones. Akari earns her first jewel stone, much to the surprise of Leon and Miria. Upon returning home, Akari decides to give the magic academy a try.
3	"Labra's Secret Dokki-doki!"; Transliteration: "Rabura no himitsu de Dokki-doki!" (Japanese: ラブラのひみつでドッキ☆ドキ！)	April 17, 2010
While Akari and Ruby are looking for their classes, Labra steals Ruby's cherry blossom, calling them dummies. Later, Ruby and Akari go to class and learn that Labra has no partner of her own and she has some secret powers. When Labra breaks the headmaster's statue with her crying, she, Ruby and Akari team up to fix it, making those two partners.
4	"Miria's Magic Dokki-doki!"; Transliteration: "Miria no Mahō de Dokki-doki!" (Japanese: ミリアの魔法でドッキ☆ドキ！)	April 24, 2010
In the Rare Rare World, Miria makes herself perfect and heads to Jewel Land. Akari fails in a second attempt to greet Yūma and also heads to Jewel Land, landing on top of Miria messing up her look and losing her bag. Since Leon has used too much of his magic, Miria swears to protect the school. With the help of Akari, she defeats it, earning her third jewel stone.
5	"Shrunken and Vanished Dokki-doki!"; Transliteration: "Kiete Chijin de Dokki-doki!" (Japanese: 消えて縮んでドッキ☆ドキ！)	May 1, 2010
Sara puts a new teacher named Sulfur in his place. Akari learns that Sara already memorized every textbook of every class, and she is now creating new spells. When Sulfur is pondering about why Sara is still in the fourth grade, Harlite explains that the only things she can understand are the things she can study and memorize.
6	"Magical Mail Order Dokki-doki!"; Transliteration: "Mahō Tsūhan de Dokki-doki!" (Japanese: 魔法通販でドッキ☆ドキ！)	May 8, 2010
Headmaster Moldavie orders another one of his dangerous mail order items, with three stopping hiccups. When all of those items were used, Akari and her friends had to run away from a monster until Labra and Peridot came and stop it, curing her hiccups. In the end, Labra won the all-year free ice cream at the strawberry café.
7	"The Magic of the Moonlit Night Dokki-doki!"; Transliteration: "Tsukiyo no Mahō de Dokki-doki!" (Japanese: 月夜の魔法でドッキ☆ドキ！)	May 15, 2010
Ruby and Akari were looking for the 1000 and 1 night flowers to cure Akari's shyness when they found out there's none of them blooming. Akari gave up making, Ruby call her a coward. When Ruby and her friends went to the Old Witch in the Eastern Cave, it was up to Akari to save them.
8	"Ding Dong Bell Dokki-doki!"; Transliteration: "Din Don Beru ni Dokki-doki!" (Japanese: ディドンベルにドッキ☆ドキ！)	May 22, 2010
Headmaster Moldavie informs that the school bells suddenly break. While practicing the Rangula spell, Akari informs Ruby and Labra that she decided not to aim for the Jewel Star because she feels it is impossible for her. Akari runs into a girl named Judy who is also practicing the Rangula spell after messing up, later learning that she has been given the duty of ringing the school bells. Despite not being initially confident, Judy successfully attempts to ring the bells. Learning that Judy is the student who won the title of Jewel Star years ago, Akari decides to aim for the Jewel Star herself.
9	"The First Exams Dokki-doki!"; Transliteration: "Hajimete no Shiken de Dokki-doki!" (Japanese: 初めての試験でドッキ☆ドキ！)	May 29, 2010
Wanting to complete the first exam, Akari has to work with Sara and Miria to catch Tata, who has stolen the headmaster's precious microphone.
10	"Mysterious Night Dokki-doki!"; Transliteration: "Fushigina Yoru ni Dokki-doki!" (Japanese: ふしぎな夜にドッキ☆ドキ！)	June 5, 2010
Tour and Sulfur have arranged for the academy to be spooky, while Akari and her friends found that they were all tricks except for the last one.
11	"Dad's Company Dokki-doki!"; Transliteration: "Papa no Kaisha de Dokki-doki!" (Japanese: パパの会社でドッキ☆ドキ！)	June 12, 2010
While the students are practicing transformation magic to transform into their fathers, Akari is embarrassed to show her father due to him lying. Halite tells her to observe her dad more closely and try again next class and ends up taking not only Labra home, but two other Jewelpets as well. After talking to him and seeing the ship, she realizes just how cool her father really is. The next day, Akari shows her class the same image of her father she showed yesterday.
12	"Manga and Dreams Dokki-doki!"; Transliteration: "Yume to Manga de Dokki-doki!" (Japanese: 夢とマンガでドッキ☆ドキ！)	June 19, 2010
After being informed about a manga competition by her sister, Akari dreams of becoming a manga artist by spending most of her spare time drawing a love story. However, she ended up getting dropped out of the competition and draws a short manga about Labra and Ruby.
13	"Leon's Secret Dokki-doki!"; Transliteration: "Reon no Himitsu ni Dokki-doki!" (Japanese: レオンの秘密にドッキ☆ドキ！)	June 26, 2010
Miria, Akari, Sara, and Leon are going on a picnic. Miria's cupcakes taste awful until Leon suggest they dip it in coconut juice. Afterwards, he took a vine bine sting that was meant for Labra, so Dian went to the dragon spring to help cure Leon's wounds.
14	"Miria's Song Dokki-doki!"; Transliteration: "Miria no Uta de Dokki-doki!" (Japanese: ミリアの歌でドッキ☆ドキ！)	July 3, 2010
Miria gets excited about entering the singing contest and winning the first place after she promised her mother to come. Realizing that her mother is late, a disappointed Miria decides to quit the audition and returns to Jewel Land. Akari decides to cheer Miria up but they end up going except Labra. Upon arriving, they accidentally knock over her mom's dress and ruins her preventing her from going to the audition. After fixing the dress, Akari lands tenth place and gets punished for using the gate.
15	"Sweets Battle Dokki-doki!"; Transliteration: "Suītsu Batoru de Dokki-doki!" (Japanese: スィーツバトルでドッキ☆ドキ！)	July 10, 2010
Ruby, Sapphie, and Garnet were challenged by Kaiya, Amelie, and Riru to a Jewelpet only cooking contest. Although Ruby was the only one that cannot cook, she won the contest and gave Akari cookies that she made.
16	"Rivals Appear!? Dokki-doki!"; Transliteration: "Raibaru Tōjō!? De dokki-doki!" (Japanese: ライバル登場！？でドッキ☆ドキ！)	July 17, 2010
Marianne, Catherine, and Angelina introduce themselves to annoy Sara and Miria. They learn about their Jewelpets' loss and become quite angry. Leon rejects making them even angrier when they see Akari fall into his arms after tripping. Sara and Miria challenge Marianne, Catherine, and Angelina to a match – in which whoever makes the better wedding dress wins and Leon is chosen as a judge. Both of them end up trying to get toripaka feathers which is too big for Miria. Although Marianne's dress was quite flashy, Leon chooses Akari's dress much to the anger of the magical angels.
17	"Rainbow Shot Dokki-doki!"; Transliteration: "Niji no Shūto de Dokki-doki!" (Japanese: 虹のシュートでドッキ☆ドキ！)	July 24, 2010
Akari decides to buy presents for her birthday and make herself her own birthday party. While watching Yūma playing basketball in the park, Akari realizes Labra is missing and calls Ruby to look for her. By the time Akari and Ruby do, the basketball match has already begun. They transform to get to the match and make it in time for the last 30 seconds. Yūma sees Akari and decides to make a three point shot for her as a birthday present.
18	"The Old Witch's Exams Dokki-doki!"; Transliteration: "Obaba no Shiken de Dokki-doki!" (Japanese: オババの試験でドッキ☆ドキ！)	July 31, 2010
For the next exam, Leon and Miria get a dragon scale from the black dragon, Sara gets some herbs, while Nicola and Akari get the witch to thank them for a three-day time limit. Akari tries to figure out that the witch detests Rare Rare World due to a picture of boy with a scar on his eyebrow. Despite their efforts, Akari was mistaken and the witch just name the boy because he had the same scar mark. When Akari and friends are about to leave without thanking, the witch accidentally earns them Jewel Stones as Akari returns the picture.
19	"Nicola and Titana Dokki-doki!"; Transliteration: "Nikora to Chitāna de Dokki-doki!" (Japanese: ニコラとチターナでドッキ☆ドキ！)	August 7, 2010
Nicola and Titana try to look for new partner after a fight. Akari decides to transform into Yūma and Ruby wears a costume to trick them into making things right.
20	"10-time Magic Doki☆Doki!"; Transliteration: "Ju-Bai Mahō de dokki ☆ doki!" (Japanese: 10倍魔法でドッキ☆ドキ！)	August 14, 2010
Akari just finished her recent manga and goes to Jewel Land for the annual festival, which occurs every four years. They can make any spell which is ten times more powerful than their original magic powers, but only do it once before a catastrophe occurs.
21	"Which is Which? Dokki-doki!"; Transliteration: "Docchi ga Docchi de Dokki-doki!" (Japanese: どっちがどっちでドッキ☆ドキ！)	August 21, 2010
Akari's classmates turned in their new spell potion except Miria and Sara. While making their potions, Headmaster Moldavie comes in and mixes both of their potions which creates chaos, switching both Miria and Sara's bodies. The girls must walk in a mile in each other's shoes to return to normal, or else they will turn into toads.
22	"It's Summer! It's the Sea! Dokki-doki!"; Transliteration: "Natsu da! Umi da! De Dokki-doki!" (Japanese: 夏だっ！海だっ！でドッキ☆ドキ！)	August 28, 2010
Akari's class has a Magical Exam on a beach vacation, in which they have to find an item called "Rainbow Pearl" located underwater. They run into all sorts of trouble, even encountering the Magical Angels.
23	"The Mysterious Wizard Dokki-doki!"; Transliteration: "Nazo no Mahōtsukai ni Dokki-doki!" (Japanese: 謎の魔法使いにドッキ☆ドキ！)	September 4, 2010
During Night Week in Jewel Land, Akari and her friends help a mute Leon return his voice by doing some research. She realizes the magical mirror is located inside the old school building, where nobody is allowed to go in. Akari seeks there and encounters a boy named Alma who looks just like Yūma.
24	"Mysterious Old Schoolhouse Dokki-doki!"; Transliteration: "Nazo no Kyūkōsha de Dokki-doki!" (Japanese: 謎の旧校舎でドッキ☆ドキ！)	September 11, 2010
Continuing from the previous episode, Akari and Yūma talk about the proof of Alma's existence. When Akari arrives in Jewel Land, everyone praises her for her powerful fight with Alma and the teachers explain who he is. She cannot seem to get her mind off and wonders why Alma resembles Yūma. Miria and Akari end up running into each other and they are both taken back to the old school building by Diana to face Alma. During the battle, Miria uses the potions but it does not quite go as planned, and Alma ends up saving them. Alma's other Jewelpet appears and tells them that they find out that Alma is actually a girl.
25	"The Forbidden Spell Doki-doki!"; Transliteration: "Kindan no Jumon ni Dokki-doki!" (Japanese: 禁断の呪文にドッキ☆ドキ！)	September 18, 2010
Akari stays with Alma until the latter wakes up and follows her outside, telling if she knows Yūma. Hearing this, Alma asks to look into Akari's memories about Yūma and explains that the twins were separated by Lady Jewelina at birth. Akari vows to become a better magician than Jewelina and wake up her mother so they can live as a happy family again. Akari meets her other friends and find out about the past stories thanks to Sara's experiment, but Alma tries to break open the seal.
26	"The Spell of Smiles Dokki-doki!"; Transliteration: "Hohoemi no Jumon ni Dokki-doki!" (Japanese: ほほえみの呪文にドッキ☆ドキ！)	September 25, 2010
Ruby finds out where Akari is sent using the Jewelpot, and goes off with Labra to bring her back. Akari uses the smile spell she learned from the memories of Opal to melt the ice, earning her two more Jewel Stones, making her a fifth grade student. When Akari returns to her world and finds Yūma, he chants the smile spell which is the only thing he remembers about his mother.
27	"The Manga Training Camp Doki-doki!"; Transliteration: "Manga Gasshuku de Dokki-doki!" (Japanese: マンガ合宿でドッキ☆ドキ！)	October 2, 2010
Akari is almost made the leader of a manga exhibition, but Mai offers instead. The pair initially thought of a story, but Akari offers to make a story involving all of their ideas, putting them in a slump. Just when Akari and Mai were about to reach their climax, the rose they were riding wilts. Akari, Sara, and Miria transform to save everyone, allowing them to finish the story. The manga ends up being successful as they wake up.
28	"The Magic of Musical Notes Doki-doki!"; Transliteration: "Onpu no Mahō de Dokki-doki!" (Japanese: 音符の魔法でドッキ☆ドキ！)	October 9, 2010
Miria gets upset after she finished second place in her singing audition, while Akari has one more Jewel Stone than her. Garnet and Sango attempt to cheer them up by preparing a concert for Miria, but nobody came due to business. Once Miria angrily said that she gave up her dream, Garnet and Sango suddenly fainted. They later found out that when the Jewelpet partner lose their dreams, their partner will suffer. Miria sings a song for the Jewelpets, cheering them up as she promises to never give up her dreams, earning another Jewel Stone.
29	"Handsome Battle Dokki-doki!"; Transliteration: "Ikemen Batoru ni Dokki-doki!" (Japanese: イケメンバトルにドッキ☆ドキ！)	October 16, 2010
Leon prepares for a battle with Sulfur while his mother is coming.
30	"The Photograph of Memories Dokki-doki!"; Transliteration: "Omoide no Shashin ni Dokki-doki!" (Japanese: 思い出の写真にドッキ☆ドキ！)	October 23, 2010
Akari created a manga for her mother's birthday, but she was upset that her mother did not let Akari show her present.
31	"Sara and Sapphie Dokki-doki!"; Transliteration: "Shara to Safī de Dokki-doki!" (Japanese: 沙羅とサフィーでドッキ☆ドキ！)	October 30, 2010
When Akari follows Sara home to return her pen, she finds out that Sara lives alone in a dorm for a government research facility. Akari finds out about a withered plant Sara keeps, which is later explained to be a gift from her parents. Upon seeing how hard Akari is working for her sake, Sara realizes just how lonely she truly is and they bring the plant back to life. Halite gives Sara her eleventh Jewel Stone and Miria brings some limited BBM that she saved for everyone to enjoy.
32	"The Magical Athletic Meet Dokki-doki!"; Transliteration: "Mahō Undōkai de Dokki-doki!" (Japanese: 魔法運動会でドッキ☆ドキ！)	November 6, 2010
During lunck break at the Jewelpet Sports Festival. a fortune-telling Jewelpet was shocked to find out how much luck Ruby has, which re-energized her to the fullest. With all of the Jewelpets on the starting line, they find out that all the previous matches did not matter and whoever wins this match will win the game. Labra, who had fallen asleep after eating too much, woke up to find the race has already started and screams.
33	"Towards Your Dreams Dokki-doki!"; Transliteration: "Yume ni Mukatte Dokki-doki!" (Japanese: 夢に向かってドッキ☆ドキ！)	November 13, 2010
Yūma sees Akari and her sister in the library causing the light in her Jewel Charm to dim. Ruby transforms both herself and Akari into different people to enter the studio where her sister is filming. Akari's transformation eventually dissolves due to lack of power from Ruby. Upon finding out the truth, she finds Yūma and confesses her feeling to him, returning the light in her Jewel Charm. Akari flies across Jewel Land and rings the school bells happily for overcoming her weaknesses.
34	"Balancing Your Options Doki-doki!"; Transliteration: "Tenbin ni Kakete Dokki-doki!" (Japanese: 天秤にかけてドッキ☆ドキ！)	November 20, 2010
Headmaster Moldavie buys another magic item from the magic mail order called ten-pin-chan, which helps them decide on what to do when they are troubled. Owing to a disagreement, they end up going to the Rare Rare World through Akari's portal. Akari learns Yūma struggles to answer her confession and is worried if she should tell him or not. No matter how useful they are, the couple still needs to confess
35	"Kohaku's Fiery Spirit Doki-doki!"; Transliteration: "Nekketsu Kohaku de Dokki-doki!" (Japanese: 熱血コハクでドッキ☆ドキ！)	November 27, 2010
A Jewelpet named Kohaku arrives and asks the dragon to take one of his pearls away before the dragon stops him. Leon and the others decide to retrieve the pearl, but end up being chased into a cave by dragons. They work together and retrieve the pearl but the lava flows down towards to the village, so Leon asks his friends who to help him stop the lava. When they return to the lake, Headmaster Moldavie arrives and gives Leon his final Jewel Stone for learning to believe in his friends.
36	"Alma and Yūma Dokki-doki!"; Transliteration: "Aruma to Yūma de Dokki-doki!" (Japanese: アルマと祐馬でドッキ☆ドキ！)	December 4, 2010
Alma finds Yūma in the Rare Rare World and takes him to Jewel Land to find the battes.
37	"Alma's Cry Dokki-doki!"; Transliteration: "Aruma no Sakebi ni Dokki-doki!" (Japanese: アルマの叫びにドッキ☆ドキ！)	December 11, 2010
Akari, Miria, and Sara stops Alma from releasing battest as she takes Yūma to Jewel Land. Upon arriving, they are overpowered by Alma and frozen in place. Alma gives Akari her staff and tells her to use it to reveal the truth to Yuma as well. The former does not believe her and throws both Akari and Yuuma out, breaking the seal on battest.
38	"The Flower Seal Dokki-doki!"; Transliteration: "Hana no Fūin ni Dokki-doki!" (Japanese: 花の封印にドッキ☆ドキ！)	December 18, 2010
The Jewelpets and their partners try to stop battest, which is thought to be too difficult a task as they informed that their Jewel Stones will disappear. With a little help from Jewelina, the Jewelpets can give their partners Jewel Stones back. Akari and Yūma discuss the series of past events, after which the latter tells that he makes sure to see Alma again someday.
39	"Snow Night Doki☆Doki!"; Transliteration: "Sunō Naito de Dokki-doki!" (Japanese: スノーナイトでドッキ☆ドキ!)	December 25, 2010
Akari shows Yūma around Jewel Land on Christmas Day.
40	"A Sparkling Round Thing Doki-doki!"; Transliteration: "Kira-kira Koron de Dokki-doki!" (Japanese: キラキラコロンでドッキ☆ドキ！)	January 2, 2011
As New Year arrives, Peridot introduced a new student from the Magic Academy named Rald to Akari, Ruby, and Labra. Rald is searching for the "Sparkling Round Thingy" for him to make his wish and find his partner. They eventually disciplined both Jewelpets and Akari gave Rald the "Sparkling Round Thingy" he is looking for: an Otoshidama containing a 500 Yen coin.
41	"Forest of Mushrooms Doki-doki!"; Transliteration: "Kinoko no Mori de Dokki-doki!" (Japanese: キノコの森でドッキ☆ドキ！)	January 8, 2011
The last exam at the Jewel Star Grand Prix is about to begin. Ruby stays at the academy overnight studying, not telling Akari and Labra about it. The next day, Akari, Sara, and Miria's last exam will be collecting the healing flowers to heal the headmaster's throat. They also find out that the Mushroom people are in a big fight and need to reunite them, but Ruby got sick along the way due to her staying overnight. Akari and her friends must heal Ruby while helping the mushroom people get along.
42	"The Grand Prix Begins Dokki-doki!"; Transliteration: "Guran Puri Kaimaku de Dokki-doki!" (Japanese: グランプリ開幕でドッキ☆ドキ！)	January 15, 2011
Once every 12 years, the Jewel Flower inside the Magic Academy blooms, signalling the beginning of the Jewel Star Grand Prix. The Jewelpets and their partners are excited on the competition, except Miria who only has 11 Jewel Stones. After the group went to Jewelina's castle for the event to take place, the Magical Angels encounter and criticize them again. As soon as Akari, Sara, Leon, and Nicola saw Miria, they feel pity and decided to not compete the tournament without her. Thanks to Miria's kindness, Headmaster Moldavite gave her the twelfth and final Jewel Stone, allowing her to compete in the Jewel Star Grand Prix with her friends.
43	"Leon and Nicola Doki☆Doki!"; Transliteration: "Reon to Nikora de Dokki-doki!" (Japanese: レオンとニコラでドッキ☆ドキ！)	January 22, 2011
The first match of the Jewel Star Grand Prix between Catherine and Akari is themed around sweets and the "Seven-Colored Waterfall" of Jewel Land. Once Catherine has finished making parfait, Akari thought she would lose but she saw Ruby making another batch of cookies and remembered the feeling of making cookies for someone they love. Akari and Ruby expressed their feelings by combining all sorts of sweets into one. In the Magic Hockey Match, Nicola and Leon fight for their pride which the latter won.
44	"The Dream Dress Dokki-doki!"; Transliteration: "Yume no Doresu de Dokki-doki!" (Japanese: 夢のドレスでドッキ☆ドキ！)	January 29, 2011
Angelina and Miria are competing in a "Dress Up" match with the first round's theme being water dress. Angelina got seven points with her magical underwater arena presentation and Miria got only one. The second round, themed around night dress, shows Angelina turning the arena into a magical night sky. The participants who cheered for Miria almost surrendered, but remembered her mother's kind words. Miria turned over the tables as she made a shining moon dress while using the night sky that Angelina made to her advantage. Angelina and Miria became friends as the latter won.
45	"Love Love Operation Dokki-doki!"; Transliteration: "Rabu Rabu Daisakusen de Dokki-doki!" (Japanese: ラブラブ大作戦でドッキ☆ドキ！)	February 5, 2011
On Valentine's Day, Akari, Ruby, and Labra were taking a break after the preliminaries in the Jewel Star Grand Prix. In the Rare Rare World, she made chocolate for Yūma. Ruby and Labra put some love potion in them so Yūma would fall in love with her. Even worse when she goes to school, some students ate her chocolate and are attracted to Akari.
46	"Turnabout and Turnabout Dokki-doki!"; Transliteration: "Gyakuten mata Gyakuten de Dokki-doki!" (Japanese: 逆転また逆転でドッキ☆ドキ！)	February 12, 2011
Sara won in the semi-finals while Akari and Marianne have to catch a Jewelpet named Flora. They have to pat her head and do not use magic while the other is trying to catch her. Ruby saves Akari who is close on catching Flora, but Kaiya used a spell to stop them. Marianne told the judges that she cheated at the end.
47	"The Mysterious Girl Dokki-doki!"; Transliteration: "Nazo no Shōjo ni Dokki-doki!" (Japanese: 謎の少女にドッキ☆ドキ！)	February 19, 2011
In the Semifinal of the Grand Prix, both Raiya and Leon were going to compete in a sword battle. Hilde with her Jewelpet partner Topaz told Akari and Sapphie about her strange behavior and the former pair decided to investigate more about her. Ruby recognized both Kaiya and Jill before she cast a spell, trapping almost everyone a void. The targeted ones are saved from the void and rushed to the stadium, finding out that the battle has started. With her cover blown, Raiya reveals herself as Alma.
48	"Akari and Miria Dokki-doki!"; Transliteration: "Akari to Maria de Dokki-doki!" (Japanese: あかりとミリアでドッキ☆ドキ!)	February 26, 2011
As the Jewelpets and their partners discuss the past events at a café, they learn that Miria will battle Akari and Sara will battle Alma for the semi-finals. After reflecting upon each other's time together, the girls are ready for their match. Whoever gets two out of three orbs into the statue first wins, but the orb cannot be moved directly. For the last orb, the pair has the same idea and summon up spirits to try to get the orb into the slot. After transforming, Sara tells Saphhie that all she can do is to make it easier for Akari by prolonging the match. As soon as the match starts, Alma sends a blast of dark energy strait towards Sara.
49	"Sara is in a Pinch Dokki-doki!"; Transliteration: "Sara no Pinchi ni Dokki-doki!" (Japanese: 沙羅のピンチにドッキ☆ドキ！)	March 5, 2011
Alma sends a blast of dark energy towards Sara in the battle, but it turns at the last minute and captures the orb. As Alma was about to send the orb into the statue, Sara tries to analyze it, causing the magic circle to end up breaking with the orb landing in the statue. When Alma summons a ginormous spell, Sara does not give up and tells Alma that she used to be like her. The spell ends up being too much for her and Alma gets the second orb into the statue winning the match. Back in Jewel Land, Alma swears that she will steal both Akari and Fealina's magic to scare Diana. The next morning, Ruby explains that they may use magic together for the last time and promise to use the little time they have left together to the fullest.
50	"The Last Magic Dokki-doki!"; Transliteration: "Saigo no Mahō ni Dokki-doki!" (Japanese: 最後の魔法にドッキ☆ドキ！)	March 19, 2011
The battle between Alma and Akari starts, and whoever can get the magic key first and open the magic door becomes the Jewel Star. Alma tries to use her dark magic to get the key and can break the barrier with Akari's good magic. Akari and Alma continue to battle for the key, only to it end up breaking because of Alma's dark power. Alma sinks even deeper into sorrow and giant vines of battest trap her. Akari and Yūma run inside to try to save her, but are taken to separate places by battest. Yūma and Labra gets dragged to where Akari is also trapped at Alma's place. When Jewelina cannot seal the battest, she realizes Akari and Ruby are the only people who can save Alma.
51	"The Shining Miracle Dokki-doki!"; Transliteration: "Kagayaku Kiseki ni Dokki-doki!" (Japanese: 輝く奇跡にドッキ☆ドキ！)	March 26, 2011
Ruby and Akari encounter some troubles while finding Alma and Yuuma. Hearing their screaming voices, everyone comes together to protect Akari as she and Labra find Alma and Yūma who cannot move. Akari holds Alma in her arms and explains to her that she is not alone. Alma, Yūma, Labra, and Ruby all chant Fealina's smile spell together. This allows Akari to be saved as she uses the spell to returns Diana and Opal. The magic key reappears, causing Alma and Yuma to run into their mother's arms. Akari is later awarded the title of Jewel Star.
52	"Three Wishes Doki-doki!"; Transliteration: "Mittsu no Negai ni Dokki-doki!" (Japanese: 3つの願いにドッキ☆ドキ！)	April 2, 2011
With Graduation Day arriving as the Jewel Star Grand Prix has ended, Ruby is sad that she would come to show it to Akari. Later on, Ruby found Alma, Opal, and Diana having a small talk, realizing how hard it can be to say goodbye. Akari and her friends looked at Jewelina's Castle and make three wishes. After the Graduation Day, Akari and her friends enjoy their last days in Jewel Land and say goodbye to their Jewelpet partners.
OVA	"A Rainbow of Smiles Doki-doki!"; Transliteration: "Hohoemi no Niji ni Dokki-doki!" (Japanese: ほほえみの虹にドッキ☆ドキ！)	July 21, 2013
One year after Last Jewel Star Grand Prix, the Jewelpets are greeting the new students of the Magic Academy, who are surprised to see the Jewel Star Crown shine as they explained about the last Jewel Star winner, Akari Sakura. In the human world, Akari begins her first day as a junior high school student while getting dressed. Back in Jewel Land, the Jewelpets saw the rainbow to reminisce the past events.
