= List of Jewelpet Kira Deco! episodes =

- Cover of the first DVD Volume of the series, showing Pink and the 5 main Jewelpets.
- No. of episodes: 52

Release
- Original network: TV Tokyo, TV Osaka
- Original release: April 7, 2012 – March 30, 2013

Series chronology
- ← Previous; Jewelpet Sunshine Next → Jewelpet Happiness

Jewelpet Kira Deco! (Japanese: ジュエルペット きらデコッ！, Hepburn: Juerupetto Kira Deko!) is the fourth Jewelpet anime series created by Sanrio and Sega and animated by Studio Comet, announced in Shogakukan's Pucchigumi magazine and directed by Makoto Moriwaki. The series first aired on April 7, 2012, on TV Tokyo and TV Osaka and ended its broadcast on March 30, 2013. The whole series is a complete departure to the previous three series, including the human character's art design is reverted to the first series. The series focuses on Pink Oomiya, a member of a Super Sentai-like team called "Kira Deco 5".

The opening theme is "Happy Lucky Go!" (ハッピーラッキーゴー！, Happī Rakkī Gō!) while the ending theme is "Friends Forever and Ever" (ずっとずっとトモダチ, Zutto Zutto Tomodachi), both performed by Mana Ashida.

Universal Music handles the DVD release of the series in Japan, with the first volume been released on August 22, 2012. Six Volumes were released so far. Victor Entertainment also released a Blu-ray Selection Box Set on September 20, 2013, which contained 16 selected episodes of the series and a special limited edition Pink Oomiya Apron of Magic card.

== Episode list ==
No.	Title	Original release date
1	"I Want a Mirror Ball Deco!"; Transliteration: "Mirā Bōru ga hoshī deko!" (Japanese: ミラーボールが欲しいデコッ～！)	April 7, 2012
In the small village called Jewel Town, Ruby, Garnet, and Sapphie get together at the Kira Kira Shop. The next day, Sapphie is about to go to class as she noticed a slideshow that fell out of the bookshelf. Curious, she showed it to the rest of her friends, explaining about the Legend of the Jewelpets and Mirror Ball. Because of this, they go on a search for the fragments of Mirror Ball all over Jewel Land, but later met up with strange individuals from the human world called Kira Deco 5.
2	"Deco Friend Deco!"; Transliteration: "Deko Furendo deko!" (Japanese: デコフレンドデコ～！)	April 14, 2012
Ruby and her friends were all confused on the sudden appearance of the 5 strange individuals from the human world called the Kira Deco 5. As the Jewelpets think they were lying due to their story, Angela sent 4 of the KiraDeco 5 to jail using her Jewel Flash, but also causing Pink to fall asleep. The next day, Pink awakens inside Kira Kira Shop, only to find out that she is almost bigger than the shop itself. Meanwhile, at the Police Station, Angela and Labra is interrogating Retsu and the rest of the Kira Deco 5 in jail.
3	"Dark Angel Coal Deco!"; Transliteration: "Dāku enjeru kōru-sama deko!" (Japanese: ダークエンジェルコール様デコ～！)	April 21, 2012
Coal, an evil Jewelpet associated with the evil group Decoranain, appeared in Jewel Land as his boss assigned him to destroy Kira Deco 5 and gather Deco Stones. At Kira Kira shop, the other members of KiraDeco 5 awakens on the strange noise inside the shop. Meanwhile, Ruby and the others were planning to go to the forest. There, the Jewelpets were all picking jewels growing on trees, while some of the members helped them on their labor. However, Coal created a Dark Jewel Cloud from his magic and trapped the others in despair. Back to Pink and Ruby, the two were still picking Jewels until they decide to find a piece of the Mirror Ball.
4	"Angela is Lost Deco!"; Transliteration: "Maigo no enjera deko!" (Japanese: 迷子のエンジェラデコ～！)	April 28, 2012
Pink and Ruby notice the Deco Stone shine and a beam of light points into a strange location on where the next one is located. As they all go to the location of the stone, the trio tried their best to guide them away from the stone. Angela got lost and both Midori and Labra ended up inside a cave, now all lost.
5	"Blue's Duel Deco!"; Transliteration: "Burū o kakete shōbu deko!" (Japanese: ブルーを賭けて勝負デコ～！)	May 5, 2012
Blue Knight Ozaki is currently living with Garnet as her personal "Sheep" in her mansion. Being a "Sheep", he must do all the errands in the mansion as Garnet ordered. Later on, he's checking the list of schedules and what to do as a butler. However, Garnet thinks Blue is his sheep, which emotionally hurts him and making Garnet sad.
6	"Slow Life Yellow Deco!" (Japanese: スローライフイエローデコ～！)	May 12, 2012
At the forest, Kiichi is listening to the sounds of the forest and relaxes as it reminds him of his birthplace. He then used his magic to trap everyone inside the tent with no avail and they were forced to show of something Deco to Coal. Sapphie and Kiichi woke up late as they were going to the academy by bus, and later found out the others were in trouble. Back at the tent, Pink and the others were getting scolded by Coal on what they're showing, Sapphie and Kiichi needs to get to the tent in time to save them.
7	"The Mysterious Monster Deco!"; Transliteration: "Nazo no monsutā deko!" (Japanese: 謎のモンスターデコ～！)	May 19, 2012
Retsu has once finished his tough training, determined to get another Deco Stone. He then sees something shining in the mountains and thinks it is another Deco Stone as he decides to investigate it, but he returns scared. The Jewelpets in town knew that there was a strange monster terrorizing the mountains. Pink and Ruby ventured into the forest, to see if the monster exist and get another Deco Stone.
8	"The Adventurous Peridot Deco!"; Transliteration: "Bōken yarō Peridotto deko!" (Japanese: 冒険野郎ペリドットデコ～！)	May 26, 2012
Peridot, an adventurous and active Jewelpet, is going to Jewel Town for a visit. As Ruby showed Pink the lucky jewel in her bathroom, the Deco Stones starts to shines and shows them the location the next stone. Peridot agreed that they should search for the lost fragments of the Deco Stone, as Pink and Ruby went with her using the Deco Bus. As they arrived as the said location, the trio searches for the Deco Stone in the whole place but there's no clue.
9	"Twice the Fun!? Deco!"; Transliteration: "Tanoshisa tsu-bai!? deko!" (Japanese: 楽しさ2倍!?デコ～！)	June 2, 2012
Ruby and Pink just recently woke up as they were greeted by Kiichi, who brought them their breakfast and left. At Sapphie's house, Sapphie showed to Kiichi about an item called Rainbow Egg, which contains a species of bird that exist on Jewel Land. As the egg doubles in size with Sapphie's magic and cracked open, it reveals a chick whom Kiichi named him Kiichiro. Meanwhile, Opal and Io informed to Coal about what happened last time regarding the Deco Stones and decides to plan a counterattack against Pink and the others.
10	"Coal's Counterattack Deco!"; Transliteration: "Gyakushū no Kōru deko!" (Japanese: 逆襲のコールデコ～！)	June 9, 2012
Pink and her friends again attended another lesson in the academy until they saw Coal behaving strangely. Coal then goes berserk and starts to destroy the place, but Ruby and her friends tried to calm him down to a couple of places to suit his interests. As Pink's group meet Coal and learned more about Decoranian, Coal unleashed his magic and created black clouds to destroy Pink and her friend's relationship with each other.
11	"Pink has no clothes deco!" Transliteration: "Pinku no fuku ga nai deko!" (Japanese: ピンクの服がないデコ～！)	June 16, 2012
Summer has come to Jewel Town and Pink is admiring the weather when she tends Kira Kira Shop. Ruby appears, being a T-shirt as Pink decides to go to the mall and shop for new clothes. At the mall, Coarumi (Coal in disguise) enters the shop and buy some black Lingerie while eying on the White Rabbit's actions. As Coarumi left, Pink came out of the room with the dress being too small. After Ruby convinced her, Topaz said that the only way for her to create Pink's new clothing is to get a certain item.
12	"Sheriff Jasper Deco!"; Transliteration: "Sherifu Jasupā deko!" (Japanese: 保安官ジャスパーデコ～！)	June 23, 2012
Jasper, a Cheetah Jewelpet arrived at Jewel Town last night after his long journey. The next morning, Pink and Ruby were about to have pudding when suddenly it disappeared. Also, mysterious disappearance cases were happening all over Jewel Town. As Tata is about to deliver the final blow, Jasper then appeared and blocked his attack, saving Midori. He then goes and fight Tata and successfully catches him, while Midori is amazed on his moves. Later at the police station, Midori admired on how good Jasper's moves were back then when Tata escaped from prison and again caused havoc.
13	"Stolen!? Deco Stone Deco!"; Transliteration: "Nusumareta!? Deko Sutōn deko!" (Japanese: 盗まれた!?デコストーンデコ～！)	June 30, 2012
KiraDeco 5 and Jewelpets hold a special meeting at Retsu's place, where he explained that they should search for another Deco Stone. The next morning, the whole shop is being investigated. When the group arrives at the mall, it has been overgrown with a lot of plants, making their trials a lot harder.
14	"Ruby and Opal are Stuck Deco!"; Transliteration: "Rubī to Opāru ga pittanko deko!" (Japanese: ルビーとオパールがぴったんこデコ～！)	July 7, 2012
Ruby accidentally tripped and crashed into Opal, but they are stuck together. Everyone tries to separate them together with no avail, even with magic until Sapphie told them to endure each other. Opal agrees sadly and she showed Ruby to her home. While stuck, Opal starts to endure Ruby's behavior in a sad and hilarious way, even making her more embarrassed to the public.
15	"Crawling on the Deserted Island Deco!"; Transliteration: "Mujintō de hau hau deko!" (Japanese: 無人島ではうはうデコ～！)	July 14, 2012
Jewelpets try to contact humans using their Jewel Pods, but with no avail due to the signal is out of reach. At Jewel Town, Pink was waiting for Ruby and the others, knowing that they are missing. Back on the island, Jewelpets were enjoying themselves. Sapphie is taking pictures of the plant life on the island until she saw something that shocked her. She told them that someone is also in this island and devoured the survivors. With no one around, the Jewelpets must do anything to survive in the island and at the same time endure each other's sanity.
16	"Heartbeat Senior Deco!"; Transliteration: "Tokimeki Senpai deko!" (Japanese: トキメキセンパイデコ～！)	July 21, 2012
Io has some problems with his feelings, concerning about Opal and Coal. As both Jewelpets appeared, the two questioned him about who likes him the most, until Coal devise a new plan that can turn Jewel Town upside down. On the other hand, Pink is remembering herself of her bad days in the Human World. Unknown to them, Pink is in a continuous dream trance, being manipulated by Coal's magic to make her steal the Deco Stones.
17	"I Love Teacher Coarumi Deco!"; Transliteration: "Korumi sensei daisuki deko!" (Japanese: コル美先生大好きデコ～！)	July 28, 2012
After the failure of Coal's last mission to get the Deco Stones, he is getting punished by the Decoranian once again. The mysterious leader of the group gives him another chance to get the remaining Deco Stones as Coal resumes his disguised form, Coarumi to actually trick the Jewelpets on trusting him. Embarrassed, Coarumi came and started treating his wounds, not knowing that Io is having a lot of feelings to her.
18	"Sweetspet Sakuran Deco!"; Transliteration: "Suwītsupetto sakuran-chan deko!" (Japanese: スウィーツペット・さくらんちゃんデコ～！)	August 4, 2012
Sakuran, a Sweetspet from the island nation of Sweetsland, is coming to Jewel Town for a visit. Sakuran then starts to look for Ruby's place to stay in until she encountered Ruby and Pink. As Sakuran explains to them about her situation, everyone decides to help soften her up. With no options left, everyone were stuck in a really tight situation as Sakuran endured her rocky state.
19	"Grand Sweetspet Gathering Deco!"; Transliteration: "Suwītsupetto Dai Shūgō deko!" (Japanese: スウィーツペット大集合デコ～！)	August 11, 2012
The festival in Jewel Town is coming and Sweetspets are busy hosting the event. At the fireworks display, Pink hosted the climax scene of the festival so Sakuran can offer her sweets to the stars. However, it didn't go well as the crowd expected, and Ruby's friends are getting confused. Because of this, Pink and Ruby decided to offer their sweets to the stars instead, though the stars like it due to the taste. After liking the offering of both Pink and Ruby, Sapphie herself found out the problem of the stars rejecting the Sweetspets' offerings.
20	"Call Me Princess Deco!"; Transliteration: "Ojōsama to Oyobi deko!" (Japanese: お嬢様とお呼びデコ～！)	August 18, 2012
Garnet is relaxing herself in the tub until Blue Knight brought her some bubble bath as the cat Jewelpet was embarrassed and shut off the curtains. Blue explained to them that Garnet's life is being targeted by someone who wants her to die. Ruby and Pink then agreed to stay at Garnet's house to protect the feline Jewelpet from harm. As they received another letter from the killer, they all went to another safe spot.
21	"Sorry, I can't say it deco!" Transliteration: "Gomen'nasai ga ienakute deko!" (Japanese: ごめんなさいが言えなくてデコ～！)	August 25, 2012
Ruby showed Pink picture of her when she was young, making Pink embarrassed as she scolded Ruby badly. The two get into a serious argue and then grabbed Ruby's Jewel Pod, pulling out the deco she put in it, and throw that away somewhere before she runs away. Ruby is mad on how Pink reacted. Meanwhile, King, a French bulldog Jewelpet has finally arrived in Jewel Town. King then got his eyes on then Deco Stones as she traded one for the crystal arm. Later on, Pink decides to stay at Sapphie's place as Ruby calls them out.
22	"The Storm called the Deco, Deco!"; Transliteration: "Arashi o yobu deko, deko!" (Japanese: 嵐を呼ぶデコデコ～！)	September 1, 2012
Both the Jewelpets and KiraDeco 5 again encounter Coal's dark clouds as they all attack the group, protecting another Deco Stone that they obtained. When the group fights back the dark clouds, Coal kissed the Deco Stone which causes a tornado, blowing and scattering everyone in Jewel Land. Everyone were all safe and trying to find their way back. Meanwhile, the others are still trying to endure each other while finding a way to re-group.
23	"Popularity Triumphs Deco!"; Transliteration: "Motemote Gekokujō deko!" (Japanese: モテモテ下克上デコ～！)	September 8, 2012
Charlotte, a bee Jewelpet and a known Honey Hunter has come to Jewel Land, where she is found by Midori. Meanwhile, Retsu is still searching for the rest of the Deco Stones on a cliff, annoying Midori even more than ever while he recalls his sad days back on Earth on how Retsu is better than him. The next day, Midori and Charlotte are trying one of Charlotte's honey. She then showed Midori a special honey called the Centipule Honey that can make any girl fall in love to him.
24	"As I dance Deco!"; Transliteration: "Budōkai ni tsuretette deko!" (Japanese: 舞踏会につれてってデコ～！)	September 15, 2012
Opal is reading a story about the princess and the prince, based on a special event happening in Jewel Land several eras ago. The next day, preparations for the dance is going smoothly in Garnet's mansion, and Blue Knight is making sure everything is well-decorated. The two then received a letter from Coal and said he is going to steal the Deco Stones tonight. Coal, after sending the letter, is determined that tonight will be his chance to send all Deco Stones to Decoranian. That night, everyone in the mansion are enjoying themselves during the dance, especially Ruby and Pink, while the police were keeping an eye on Coal.
25	"Sparkle-Sparkle at the Saury Village Deco!"; Transliteration: "Sanma Mura de Gira-gira gin deko!" (Japanese: サンマ村でギンギラギンデコ～！)	September 22, 2012
Ruby, Pink, Sapphie, and Kiichi are going fishing in the lake to catch some Saury. However, Ruby is impatient seeing she wanted to catch a Sparkling Saury for her collection. In an unexpected event, the group encountered a huge school of Saury, all sparking and coming down the river much to their surprise. Shinobu, the pink Saury, explains on why they can talk. Shinobu then calls the other Saury and praising Ruby for her admiration to the Saury as they all give the group a warm welcome, while the Elder of the village appeared.
26	"A Big Discovery While Hiking Deco!"; Transliteration: "Haikingu de daihakken deko!" (Japanese: ハイキングで大発見デコ〜！)	September 29, 2012
Ruby remembered something about what she saw during the time when the tornado blew Deco Stone away. The group decides to find out further as they a hike in the mountains. Later on, everyone are inside the Decobus, discussing about the hiking. Just then, Ruby's Jewel Pod starts to ring and then answered the call, revealing a strange human female contacting them. KiraDeco 5 recognized her as Professor Decorski, their boss and the one who updated the Kira Deco 5's equipment. Ruby, Garnet and Sapphie encounters it using their Jewel Magic.
27	"Giant Space War Deco!"; Transliteration: "Jaianto uchū taisen deko!" (Japanese: ジャイアント宇宙大戦デコ～！)	October 6, 2012
Due to a strange meteor, the Mirror Ball cracked into pieces and the Deco Stones are scattered all over Jewel Land. Jewelina turns into stone and the only way to revive her is to collect all the Deco Stones. After knowing the whole truth, their problems now concerns on Coal, who steals the Deco Stone as he attacks Ruby and defeats her. Meanwhile, the leader of the Decoranian scolded Coal for failing his last mission and given him one more chance not to fail.
28	"Princess Kaguya Luna Deco!"; Transliteration: "Kaguya no Runa Hime deko!" (Japanese: かぐやのルナ姫デコ～！)	October 13, 2012
Rald saw a small rabbit Jewelpet inside named Luna, confusing her as a panda. Coal overhears this and he finds an opportunity to kidnap Luna. As Pink and her friends are about to invite Luna, Rald suddenly appears and take Luna away after him. Later that day, Rald and Luna tending the house. After the battle, the Dark General scolded Coal and demoted him for his last failure. He now orders one of his agents to make its move against the Kira Deco 5. Note: The episode is a reference to the Japanese folktale The Tale of the Bamboo Cutter, as Luna's first appearance in the episode is similar to how Kaguya is born in the bamboo thicket.
29	"And Then There Were Gone Deco!"; Transliteration: "Soshite daremoinakunatta deko!" (Japanese: そして誰もいなくなったデコ～！)	October 20, 2012
Sapphie was sleeping during her studies until Kiichi wakes her up and tells her to go to the mansion. When they notice that no one's home, the others go inside and Midori gets scared. Meanwhile, Pink and Ruby were walking in the hallway of the mansion until her Jewel Pod runs out of power. As Retsu keeps up with his search, he then encounters someone. They all rush to the scene and saw Retsu tied up upside down and out cold, making Midori cry. Sapphie starting to find out who is the culprit behind those attacks.
30	"Hot Guy Paradise Village Deco!"; Transliteration: "Ikemen paradaisu-mura deko!" (Japanese: イケメン・パラダイス村デコ～！)	October 27, 2012
Professor Decorski gives the gang information about the location of the next Deco Stone. According to Pink, the location is in the middle of Jewel Land's huge desert area, but Coal overhears them and plans his next move. In all the commotion, they encounter a Jewelpet named Amelie, and asks the gang to save her from a person named the Gorilla King. They all decide to break into the place and rescue Pink from his clutches. As they try to get her out, Blue discovers another Deco Stone inside the cardboard ball chained onto Pink's leg.
31	"Special Technique! Tornado Whirlwind Kick Deco!"; Transliteration: "Hissatsu de chiyu! Torunēdo senpū ashi deko!" (Japanese: 必殺でちゅ！ トルネード旋風脚デコ〜！)	November 3, 2012
Midori lost to Retsu again on a game of cards. Determined to get stronger, he decides to leave Jewel Town to train himself. Back at Jewel Town, Labra and Angela tell Pink and Ruby about him training somewhere. Later on, Pink looks at Midori getting scolded back at the Dojo about the training he's doing. Midori decides to keep on training under Titana's guidance, while Pink and Ruby support him in secret.
32	"Jewel of Fate Deco!"; Transliteration: "Unmei no jueru deko!" (Japanese: 運命のジュエルデコ～！)	November 10, 2012
Garnet is happy with Blue for being groomed, while the others were searching for another Deco Stone in a plain land. As Pink and the Jewelpets approach him, the young girl awoke from Blue's hands and is confused on where she is. The group learns that her name is Mako, hailing from Ueno, Japan. Mako wishes to go to Jewel Land and is mysteriously reported into the place, due to the strange necklace she has. As they believed her story, Mako asks Blue to pick her up, making Garnet green with envy. When they arrive to the place, they all meet Rald once again but something is wrong with him as he goes on a rampage to the group.
33	"I'm not Falling in Love Deco!"; Transliteration: "Ore ni Horecha ikenai ze deko!" (Japanese: 俺に惚れちゃいけないぜデコ～！)	November 17, 2012
Ruby and Pink eat donuts in Kira Kira Shop, but they fight as Pink ate the last donut. One of the Dark General's Four Heavenly Kings, Kaiser, decides to make his move. Later on, Ruby decides to catch some Saury in the town creek until she bumped into Kaiser (in a black bunny disguise), knocking him out and the apples he's carrying. Ruby decides to help him and he introduces himself as a black rabbit as he shows her his home. Back at the shop, Pink then sees Kaiser dressed in normal human clothing and goes by the name Shibuya, who tripped his foot. Pink decides to help Kaiser and in return, she starts to fall in love with him. Not knowing to the two, Kaiser has a trap set up for the both of them.
34	"Colorful Tournament of Love Deco!"; Transliteration: "Koi no karafuru tōnamento deko!" (Japanese: 恋のカラフル・トーナメントデコ～！)	November 24, 2012
Pink is still heartbroken on how Kaiser manipulated both her and Ruby's love. As the rest of the group arrives to see an angry Pink, they all tried to cheer her up, much to her dismay. the boys were about to save her, Ruby fired two love arrows into them, saving both Pink and Garnet from the collapsing bridge. The pets are relieved that they were safe and Pink is starting to fall in love to Purple. Coal and Io were together as Coal complains about Christmas.
35	"Angela and the Jewel Duel Deco!"; Transliteration: "Enjera to Jueru shiyou ze deko!" (Japanese: エンジェラとジュエルしようぜデコ～！)	December 1, 2012
Ruby is chased by someone until she's hit by a dark blast, turning her into a card. As the card goes to the mysterious cloaked figure, Retsu intimidated him and wanted to know his identity. The mysterious figure takes off his clothing and reveals himself as a gray maine coon Jewelpet named Dian, one of the Four Heavenly Kings. Once they accepted the challenge, Dian used his Jewel Magic to create a stadium for their duel. The duel begins with Dian making his first turn, summoning Peridot. Dian defeats both pets with him winning the game and reclaiming another Jewel Stone.
36	"The Legendary Athletic Course Deco!"; Transliteration: "Densetsu no asurechikku deko!" (Japanese: 伝説のアスレチックデコ～！)	December 8, 2012
Both Labra and Angela saw Midori jogging when Labra sees how fast he is through her Jewel Pod. Retsu then passes through and is surprised on how much faster he is than Midori. At the camp, Midori is still mad on how he has been treated. As he is lost and got scared by a group of tsuchinoko, Retsu finally found him but blamed him on leaving his place. Everyone at the camp were surprised at Midori's story and think that Retsu isn't being a good older brother.
37	"The Ninja wants to show off at the Castle, Deco!"; Transliteration: "Ninja ga shiro de medachitai, deko!" (Japanese: 忍者が城で目立ちたいデコ～！)	December 15, 2012
The gang feels lucky to obtain another Deco Stone as the Deco Bus is taking them back to Jewel Town. When they set foot in it, their clothing transformed into ninja clothing. At the top of the castle, there are three Jewelpets who were watching their every move: Chite, Yuku and Nix. They form a group called the NEET Triangle, and decide to spy on the others until Coal interrupts. With none of their tricks work on them, Yuku decides that they should reveal themselves.
38	"Very Merry Decoristmas deco!" Transliteration: "Berī Merī Dekorimasu deko!" (Japanese: ベリーメリーデコリマスデコ～！)	December 22, 2012
It is the night before Christmas and Pink has finished decorating Kira Kira Shop. Ruby tells Pink about their version of Christmas day called Decoristmas, and wishes DecoSanta give them presents this year. However, in the morning, Ruby was disappointed and worse, the denizens of Jewel Town didn't get a visit from DecoSanta. As the DecoBus takes both of them to Decoristmas Mountains, Ruby and Pink wonder about their wishes to him. They then found out that Peridot is indeed DecoSanta and even worse, she never liked the job. Peridot is searching for a mysterious item called Ice Egg and it causes her getting stuck.
39	"Officer Labra: 24 Hours Deco!"; Transliteration: "Rabura keisatsu: 24-ji deko!" (Japanese: ラブラ警察 24時デコ～！)	December 29, 2012
Labra and Angela get arrested by the Jewel Land Police due to failing their duties as Police Officers. Later at court, the denizens in Jewel Town are in a huge frenzy against the two alleged officers as Pink and her group can't help but watch. The group gets worried as Angela was sentenced to 1005 years and two months worth of imprisonment, as the police takes the Alpaca Jewelpet away. Having no choice, Labra must work solo and reveal that Angela is innocent. Labra asked her friends to help her on her case to search for the real culprit as they all agree on wanting to bust Angela out.
40	"Deco New Deco Year Deco!"; Transliteration: "Dekomashite o-medeko deko!" (Japanese: デコましておめデコデコ～！)	January 5, 2013
On New Year's Day, the group were enjoying noodles at the Kira Kira Shop before the advent of the new year, thanks to Kiichi's cooking until they all heard Rald's call.
41	"Nephrite the Cleaner Deco!"; Transliteration: "Shimatsu-ya nefuraito deko!" (Japanese: 始末屋ネフライトデコ～！)	January 12, 2013
As Coal takes out the trash, he encounters a Pembroke Welsh Corgi Jewelpet named Nephrite and took him back to his hideout for some serious talk. Coal told him to steal Ruby's Jewel Pod holding the stones, but this came with a price as he agreed. At Kira Kira Shop, Ruby feels refreshed after a long night's sleep. Unknowingly to them both, Nephrite is in the scene and is preparing his rifle with a suction cup on the tip to catch Ruby. Note: This episode is entirely a reference to Takao Saito's manga Golgo 13, with Nephrite carrying a briefcase with a cleaning gun inside that resembles a customized sniper rifle. This is similar on how Duke Togo carries his customized Sniper Rifle in a briefcase.
42	"The Tonzuradamus Prophecy Deco!"; Transliteration: "Tonzuradamusu no dai yogen deko!" (Japanese: トンズラダムスの大予言デコ～！)	January 19, 2013
Winter is coming in Jewel Land and everyone is busy cleaning up the fallen leaves all around Jewel Town. KiraDeco 5 gets rather puzzled on the sudden change of events until their Jewel Pods starts to blink, finding out that Jewel Land is in the blink of destruction, when they shifted their focus on the strange Jewelpet named Milky. In the midst of excitement, Coal appears and is ready to claim the Deco Stone hidden on Milky's cart. To make their problems worse, the prediction that Tonzuradamus made that could destroy Jewel Land for good.
43	"Crane Dance Gunma Karuta Deco!"; Transliteration: "Tsuru mau Gunma karuta deko!" (Japanese: ツル舞う群馬カルタデコ～！)	January 26, 2013
Coal successfully gets one of the Deco Stones and corrupts it using his dark magic. When he passes out, the corrupted Deco Stone floated away from his hideout and into somewhere. Meanwhile, KiraDeco 5 looks for Coal and the Deco Stone he stole from them. As they accept the Deco Stone's challenge, Coal tells them on how powerful the corrupted Deco Stone is and they may not stand a chance while competing to get it back.
44	"A Duel of Love Amigo Deco!"; Transliteration: "Ai no kettō amīgo deko!" (Japanese: 愛の決斗アミーゴデコ～！)	February 2, 2013
In an abandoned desert town in Jewel Land, Sapphie and Kiichi search for another Deco Stone while befriending some wild animals living in the area. At Coal's hideout, Coal is notified that both Kohaku and Tour are now in Jewel Land to take over his job. Back at the deserted town, both Kiichi and Sapphie are still looking for the Deco Stones, until finding out the buffalo that he helped earlier give them one. Not knowing to them that he's keeping them busy for Tour to capture Sapphie and Kiichi, along with the Deco Stone they found.
45	"Goodbye Teacher Coarumi Deco!"; Transliteration: "Sayonara Korumi sensei deko!" (Japanese: さよならコル美先生デコ～！)	February 9, 2013
Coal, Io, and Opal successfully return to their hideout with him, wanting to be given another chance by Decoranian. At class, the group notices Coarumi being depressed with Pink not knowing what's going on with her. Ruby and her friends decide to cheer her up and relift her spirits.
46	"Dark Knight Blue Deco!"; Transliteration: "Dāku Naito Burū deko!" (Japanese: ダークナイト・ブルーデコ～！)	February 16, 2013
Opal learns that Coal is nothing but a pawn to the Dark General's plans to take over Earth using the corrupted Deco Stones. Meanwhile, KiraDeco 5 and Jewelpets are desperately searching for Coal. Garnet talks about her being happy with his side until Retsu tells him to search.
47	"Is the True Friendship here!? Deco!"; Transliteration: "Hontō no Yūjō wa Koko ni aru!? deko!" (Japanese: 本当の友情はここにある!?デコ～！)	February 23, 2013
With nowhere to go, Coal ends up in an urban desert city while thinking over his purpose after being fired from Decoranian. He then settles in an Internet Cafe named NetCafe Yamish and decides to play an online game called Yami Quest. When Black Angel begins questioning everyone and failed, he meets a girl player named Yamimin and offered her a Dark Apple as a gift. As their quest continues, they both encounter Sapphie and got into another battle, which ends well while getting their first clue. Meanwhile, Pink and Ruby both do something to break Black Angel and Yamimin's friendship apart.
48	"Greetings! The Strongest Friend Deco!"; Transliteration: "Yoroshiku! Saikyō no Tomo deko!" (Japanese: 四露死苦!最強の友デコ〜!)	March 2, 2013
Dian and Tour think why Retsu is immune to all dark magic and want him to encounter it. Retsu turns both Kohaku and Tour back into their Jewel Charm forms to demonstrate his strength to them and Dian, using Midori's voice, commanded him to eradicate the KiraDeco 5.
49	"Smoothpet Bald Deco!"; Transliteration: "Suberupetto zura deko!" (Japanese: スベルペットズラデコ～！)	March 9, 2013
Jewelpets and KiraDeco 5 meet up in the Kira Kira Shop to discuss how many more Deco Stones they will find. When they try to find out how to get them, Diana, a munchkin cat Jewelpet, gets annoyed on the Kira Deco 5 ignoring her in the last few events of the series. With her anger boiling up, she used her Jewel Magic and take the group to another dimension called Smoothland, where everything is as smooth as a bald man's head. The challenge for them is to make Diana and the other Jewelpets laugh.
50	"Pink is a Kira Deco High School Girl!? Deco!"; Transliteration: "Pinku wa Kira Deko Mesukōsei!? deko!" (Japanese: ぴんくはきらデコ女子高生!?デコ～！)	March 16, 2013
Kaiser is being explained by the Dark General about the recent happenings. Meanwhile, Pink and Ruby were both searching for the remaining Deco Stones just outside Jewel Town with no luck. Out of nowhere, Kaiser appears in front of the two and starts to attack the duo. As Pink remembers that she is a high school student and enjoys her life, Pink doesn't know that she has been manipulated in an unknown world.
51	"Decisive Battle! Saitama Ultra Arena Deco!"; Transliteration: "Kessen! Saitama Urutora Arīna deko!" (Japanese: 決戦！さいたまウルトラアリーナデコ～！)	March 23, 2013
The Dark General plans his final stand against those, to stand in his way by using the power of Yami Stones. The group has their short celebration until a call from Professor Decorski told them he was coming to Jewel Land. The Dark General attacked everyone in the land including the civilians, turning everything to coal, taking down Jewelina's statue from the mountains above, as well as turning the sun pitch black. Professor Decorski calls again and says the group can finally transform due to their bond and trust to their Jewelpet partners, each of them gaining their own Jewel of Fate.
52	"Everyone Sparkle Deco! Deco!"; Transliteration: "Minna Kira Deko! deko!" (Japanese: みんなきらデコッ！デコ～！)	March 30, 2013
Labra is turned back into her charm from the Dark General's blast, while Coal turns into a diamond with both parties mourning on their deaths. However, the Dark General cannot accept this, and he decides to destroy everything on his path. Kira Deco 5 fights against him, while Kiichi is blocking his attacks and protecting the rest of the citizens. After the battle, the Earth went back to its own dimension and everything is back to normal. A few months later, Pink and the other humans returned to the human world at last. She finally has new courage to face her dreams as herself and never forgetting her friends back at Jewel Land.
