= List of Jewelpet: Magical Change episodes =

no
- No. of episodes: 39

Release
- Original network: TV Tokyo, TV Osaka
- Original release: April 4 – December 26, 2015

Series chronology
- ← Previous; Lady Jewelpet Next → Rilu Rilu Fairilu ~ Yousei no Door ~

Jewelpet: Magical Change (ジュエルペット マジカルチェンジ, Juerupetto Majikaru Chenji) is the 7th and final installment of the Jewelpet anime franchise created by Sanrio and Sega and animated by Studio DEEN. It was first announced by Rowt Fealer and Sanrio in the 2015 Winter Wonder Festival in Japan and was confirmed in the March Issue of the Shogakukan magazine Pucchigumi. The series aired on April 4, 2015, on TV Tokyo and TV Osaka and is directed by Nobuhiro Kondo and written by Masahiro Yokotani. It is the first Jewelpet installment to be officially handled by Studio Gallop.

The series revolves around Airi Kirara, a 14-year-old junior high student who encounters a Jewelpet named Ruby which she becomes friends with. During that time, a strange castle has fallen from the sky into her town without warning, causing confusion to arise about where this castle came from. People have come in to investigate, but the castle is inaccessible to humans. Now being called the Jewel Castle, people have never known the castle is of otherworldly origin, as Jewel Land's magic fades, the castle appears in the human world due to mankind's fading belief in magic. In order to strengthen its magic once more, Jewelpets are sent all across the Human World in order to study their way of life and in hopes that their helping hand could rekindle their "magic-believing hearts". Years later, Airi is now living with and her older brother and her new Jewelpet friends ever since after the Jewel Castle had fallen to their town. But during an incident, Airi and Ruby discover some strange new powers together that can help them. Together, Airi and the Jewelpets much help each other to solve mysteries and also find a way to bring the castle back to Jewel Land.

Hajime Hyakkoku of Fukai Music Factory composed the music for the series. The opening song is titled Magical Change (マジカル☆チェンジ, Majikaru☆Chenji) by Magical☆Dreaming, a group composed of members of Dorothy Little Happy, GEM and X21. The first ending theme is titled Tell me tell me!! by Dorothy Little Happy while the second is titled Baby, Love me! by GEM and the third titled Magical☆Kiss (マジカル☆キス Majikaru☆Kisu?) by X21.

== Episode list ==
No.	Title	Original release date
1	"Search for Ruby! / Magical Change with a Magical Stone!"; Transliteration: "Rubī o sagase! / Mahō no ishi de majikaruchenji!" (Japanese: ルビーをさがせ！ / 魔法の石でマジカルチェンジ！)	April 4, 2015
Search for Ruby!: 7 years ago, Airi Kirara encountered a Jewelpet named Ruby during her childhood and wanted to see her do magic. Now years later, Airi met other Jewelpets while cleaning the house until she notices that Ruby is missing. As they find her in a warehouse, the two discover a new ability. Magical Change with a Magical Stone!: Feeling confused about Ruby's transformation, her childhood friend Laura finally arrives from France to greet her and tell her that a thief is about to steal a precious pendant, and Airi needs to guard it. But they didn't know it was all an elaborated trap.
2	"Laura, Full of Dreams / Labra is Going Out on an Errand Labu~"; Transliteration: "Yume-darake no rōra / Rabura, o tsukai suru ra buu ~" (Japanese: 夢だらけのローラ / ラブラ、おつかいするらぶぅ～)	April 11, 2015
Laura, Full of Dreams: Laura has grown up as a rich heir of her family's company, but she is still saddened that there are things missing from her life. When she falls in love with Airi's brother, things start to get complicated. Labra is Going Out on an Errand Labu~: When the Kirara Family has Curry Katsu for dinner, they don't realize at the last minute that they're all out of Fukujinzuke. Now, its Labra's turn to do the shopping work, despite her lack of knowledge of humans and more importantly, her age.
3	"Magical Change Idol! / I despise my tail!" Transliteration: "Aidoru ni majikaruchenji! / Shippo nante dai kirai!" (Japanese: アイドルにマジカルチェンジ！ / しっぽなんて大キライ！)	April 18, 2015
Magical Change Idol!: The first ever Jewel Mall Image Girl contest is being held in Airi's town, and Larima wished that she can join the contest in her dreams to become an Idol. However, things get rather competitive.. I despise my tail!: Larima always lose to hide and seek due to her big tail being exposed all the time. She herself wished that her tail is shorter and cast a spell on it, however she is unaware of the consequences..
4	"You don't even need Magic!? / What kind of person is Dad?"; Transliteration: "Mahō nante iranai!? / Papa tte don'na hito?" (Japanese: 魔法なんていらない！？ / パパってどんなひと？)	April 25, 2015
You don't even need Magic!?: Airi's older brother Sakutaro wants to prove that everything in the world isn't about magic and can be solved by science. He develops a mechanical pet that can be as reliable as a Jewelpet, but can it hold up to Ruby and the others? What kind of person is Dad?: Luna tries to find out and guess what kind of person Airi's father is and regarding the Magical Change Stone Airi has. With all she knows being that he is in a business trip, she and the others guess what he looks like.
5	"Melonpan Carnival / And Everyone's gone" Transliteration: "Meronpankānibaru / Soshite min'na inaku natta" (Japanese: メロンパンカーニバル / そしてみんないなくなった)	May 2, 2015
Melonpan Carnival: Due to a budget crisis, the Kirara Family can only eat Melonpan everyday. Things get out of control however when a Melonpan Carnival begins. And Everyone's gone: Labra suddenly disappears, and Airi has to investigate her disappearance.
6	"Who's the Snack Thief? / Defeat all the Ghosts!"; Transliteration: "Oyatsu dorobō wa dare? / Obake o yattsukero!" (Japanese: おやつドロボーは誰? / オバケをやっつけろ!)	May 9, 2015
Who's the Snack Thief?: Labra is looking forward for snacktime until she finds all the food is gone. Now hungry and mad, she tries to find the culprit behind this heinous crime. Defeat all the Ghosts!: Airi receives a request from Laura regarding ghosts haunting their school. As she and her friends investigate the situation, things go from bad to worse.
7	"Sakutaro Adoption Plan / Garnet has arrived!" Transliteration: "Sakutarō yōshi-ka keikaku / Gānetto ga kita!" (Japanese: 朔太郎養子化計画 / ガーネットが来た！)	May 16, 2015
Sakutaro Adoption Plan: Laura is still longing for Sakutaro to be her older brother and will do anything to have him. Luea comes up a plan to use magic to "adopt" him. Garnet has arrived!: At the Kirara Detective Agency, the computer owned by Airi and her brother wants a fashionable and cute girl. When Garnet crash lands into the Human World, she may be the solution to its problem.
8	"Sweets Operation! /Sango's Sweet Shop"; Transliteration: "Suītsu dai sakusen desu wa!/ Sango no suītsu-ya-san" (Japanese: スイーツ大作戦ですわ! / サンゴのスイーツ屋さん)	May 23, 2015
Sweets Operation!: Laura knows that Sakutaro doesn't like many desserts, but does like handmade sweets. Wanting to use this to get his attention, Luea summons Sango to the Human World.. Sango's Sweet Shop: Sango opens her own pastry shop in town, but the problem is that she gets less to no customers. Airi and her friends have no choice to help her..
9	"Return the Real Dog"; Transliteration: "Watasu futsū no inu ni modoru dasu" (Japanese: ワタス普通の犬に戻るダス)	May 30, 2015
King comes to the human world, and has been adopted by an intelligent university student. Not knowing he was mistaken to the dog originally belonging to the owner, she asks for help from Airi and friends to search for the real dog and get it back to its owner before King faces more problems..
10	"Patting Shop Paca~♪ / Earth's Destruction Paca~♪"; Transliteration: "Nade nade-ya-san paka ~♪ / Chikyū metsubō paka ~♪" (Japanese: なでなで屋さんパカ～♪ / 地球滅亡パカ～♪)	June 6, 2015
Patting Shop Paca~♪: Angela has appeared in the Human World and is shown to heal a lot of people by just patting her soft wool. Ruby suggests she should open a shop for it.. Earth's Destruction Paca~♪: Labra and Angela discover that the Earth is shrinking, and Airi and her friends have to do something to save it.
11	"Just do it Kappa"; Transliteration: "Kappa ni shiyagare" (Japanese: カッパにしやがれ)	June 13, 2015
Airi and her friends head out to the forest for some picnic. However during their time, a Kappa named Miya appears in front of them. As she is taken to the Detective Agency, the pets got along with her and Larima teaches her not to be shy at others. After gaining her courage escorting her back to the mountains, Larimar gets into trouble.
12	"I want a Pet Labu~ / Jewel Watch Memories"; Transliteration: "Petto o kaitai rabu~ / Omoide no Jueru Wotchi" (Japanese: ペットを飼いたいらぶぅ～ / 思い出のジュエルウォッチ)	June 20, 2015
I want a Pet Labu~: Labra herself is a Jewelpet, but she wants a pet of her own. When she found a banana on a cardboard box, things get rather complicated for her. Jewel Watch Memories: And old woman named Tokiko visits the Kirara Detective Agency, asking her help in searching for the owner of an old Jewel Watch belonging to Titana. She states that Titana has been missing for 60 years now.
13	"Aim! Jewel Castle / Sneak in! Jewel Castle!"; Transliteration: "Mezase! Jueru-jō / Sen'nyū! Jueru-jō" (Japanese: めざせ！ジュエル城 / 潜入！ジュエル城)	June 27, 2015
Aim! Jewel Castle: As Ruby is lazy on figuring out how to get back to Jewel Land, Opal appears in front of her and tells her about a way to go back to Jewel Land. The problem lies in the portal to Jewel Land being located everywhere in the city, and some locations are hard to get in.. Sneak in! Jewel Castle!: Airi and her friends finally arrive to Jewel Land thanks to the portal. Seeing the castle in its glory, she learns more regarding the pendant she has.
14	"We are Jewel Pads! / Swim! Jewelpets!"; Transliteration: "Watashi! Juerupaddo! / Oyoge! Juerupetto!" (Japanese: わたし！ジュエルパッド！ / およげ！ジュエルペット！)	July 4, 2015
We are Jewel Pads!: Sakutaro creates a new app for the Jewel Pad, but things go bad when everyone but Luna get trapped inside the Jewel Pads. They must find a way to get Luna to notice them before it's too late. Swim! Jewelpets!: Laura invites Airi and her friends to her private swimming pool, in hopes of stealing Airi's pendant and winning over Sakutaro's attention.
15	"Huge Bathhouse Wish Happens! / This Kind of Sushi Shop is a No!"; Transliteration: "Dekai furo nya a yume ga aru! / Kon'na sushi-ya wa iyadēsu!" (Japanese: デカイ風呂にゃあ夢がある！ / こんな寿司屋はイヤデース！)	July 11, 2015
Huge Bathhouse Wish Happens!: When the house bathtub breaks down, Ruby use her magic to summon a large bathhouse. However, she unknowingly made a connection with Laura's bathroom instead. This Kind of Sushi Shop is a No!: Peridot, now working in a sushi restaurant must deliver a huge order of sushi by noon. However, things don't go easy as Peridot develops a habit on snitching the food.
16	"The Island of Doctor S / The Fuerupetto is Number One!"; Transliteration: "Dokutā S no shima / Fuerupetto de nanbāwan!" (Japanese: ドクターSの島 / フエルペットでナンバーワン！)	July 18, 2015
The Island of Doctor S: During a summer cruise, a thunderstorm cause a giant wave to wash up the ship and separates the group in a deserted island. As Sakutaro's group tries to find a way out, Airi's group tries to make the best of it. But little that they know, they aren't alone. The Fuerupetto is Number One!: Sapphie invents a device that allows her to clone herself as a way to gain more friends. But the clones soon get out of hand when they started making too many clones of themselves. Airi and the jewelpets started up a competition in hopes of finding the real Sapphie.
17	"The Idol's Debut Makes a Fuss!? / A Star is Born in the Jewel Cafe!?"; Transliteration: "Aidorudebyū wa ōsawagi!? / Juerukafe de sutā tanjō!?" (Japanese: アイドルデビューは大騒ぎ！？ / ジュエルカフェでスター誕生！？)	July 25, 2015
The Idol's Debut Makes a Fuss!?: In hopes to continue fulfilling her dreams of becoming an idol, Larima decides to get some training from the other Jewelpets, but she soon realizes how tough it was and later gets unsatisfying results. A Star is Born in the Jewel Cafe!?: As Larima prepares for her debut event, she starts feeling a bit uneasy, thinking she may not have the qualities of becoming an idol.
18	"Magical Stamp Rally / The Counterattack of the Empire of the Seals"; Transliteration: "Majikarusutanpurarī / In kan teikokunogyakushū" (Japanese: マジカルスタンプラリー / インカン帝国の逆襲)	August 1, 2015
Magical Stamp Rally: During an annual event, Ruby turns into a stamp marking inside a girl's notebook, but after getting separated from her, Ruby tries to find her. The Counterattack of the Empire of the Seals: As Airi becomes tired of always having to use a seal for incoming packages, Ruby uses her magic to no longer need seals. But when their home seal comes to life instead, it runs away and gathers other seals to set a journey across sea.
19	"The Revenge! Ruby vs. Luea / Give me crayons Labu~!"; Transliteration: "Ribenji! Rubī vs. Rūa / Kureyon o kureyo n-ra bu~u~!" (Japanese: リベンジ！ルビーVSルーア / クレヨンをくれよンらぶぅ～！)	August 8, 2015
The Revenge! Ruby vs. Luea: Luea challenges Ruby in a magical duel, in which if Luea wins she'll get Airi's pendent. Give me crayons Labu~!: Labra enjoys coloring with crayons, but when her favorite color crayon becomes short and dull. Labra used her magic to transform her and the other Jewelpets into crayons.
20	"The Uninvited Sister / The Great Midsummer Change of Sango"; Transliteration: "Oshikake shisutā! / Sango manatsu no dai gyakuten" (Japanese: 押しかけシスター！ / サンゴ・真夏の大逆転)	August 15, 2015
The Uninvited Sister: When Airi comes down with a cold, Laura volunteers to take over Airi's place as Sakutaro's sister for the day. The Great Midsummer Change of Sango: Sango becomes depressed when no one has been arriving to her Sweet Shop, but soon the Jewelpets discovered she has been trying to serve hot sweets during summer.
21	"Let me hear your voice / Ruby and Ruby"; Transliteration: "Koewokikasete / Rubī to Rubī" (Japanese: 声を聞かせて / ルビーとルビー)	August 22, 2015
Let me hear your voice: After Airi's Jewel Pad gets destroyed, the Jewelpets try getting her the latest model as a replacement. But when they discover that almost everyone in town wants one, it becomes harder than they expected. Ruby and Ruby: While enjoying her brand new Jewel Pad, Ruby suddenly gets strange phone calls and even get a call from herself from another world. Note: All of Ruby's partners made a small cameo in this episode.
22	"Magical Bilingual Fluency / Sakutaro, in love during the summer festival!?" Transliteration: "Majikaruperappera de bairingaru!? / Sakutarō, natsu matsuri no koi!?" (Japanese: マジカルペラッペラでバイリンガル！？ / 朔太郎、夏祭りの恋！？)	August 29, 2015
Magical Bilingual Fluency: When Ruby's magic accidentally turns Luna into a professional business worker, Airi and the Jewelpets are amazed on her new talent. Sakutaro, in love during the summer festival!?: During the summer festival, Sakutaro tries to find a girl who helped him find his parents while he was younger.
23	"The freeloader who came from the human world" Transliteration: "Ningen-kai kara kita isōrō" (Japanese: 人間界から来た居候)	September 5, 2015
The freeloader who came from the human world: While experimenting with Airi's pendant, Sakutaro accidentally transported into Jewel Land, where he meets another Jewelpet named Alex, who seems impress by Sakutaro's knowledge of science.
24	"The Sprout does not Appear Labu~ / The Fashion Show with the see-through pet" Transliteration: "Me ga denai-ra bu~u~ / Sukerupetto de fasshonshō" (Japanese: 芽がでないらぶぅ～ / スケルペットでファッションショー)	September 12, 2015
The Sprout does not Appear Labu~: Labra becomes frustrated when her potted plant hasn't sprouted yet, so Ruby use her magic to her out. The Fashion Show with the see-through pet: Garnet agrees to help out Larima with her idol dream by making a dress that only skilled idols are meant to wear.
25	"Ruby's rival!? Granite"; Transliteration: "Rubī no raibaru!? Guranaito" (Japanese: ルビーのライバル！？グラナイト)	September 19, 2015
Ruby's rival!? Granite: When Airi and the jewelpets discover Granite who is unconscious and acting strange than usual, Sakutaro declares that Granite has been poisoned by a rare mountain plant. Airi and her friends must quickly find a flower called "nice good looking man" to cure Granite before it too late.
26	"The magical change into a jewel bento / Uncovered! The Secret of the Magical Forture Telling / The Magical Fairy Tale of Sakutaro"; Transliteration: "Jueru bentō majikaruchenji/ Abake! Majikaru uranai no himitsu! / Sakutarō no majikaru otogibanashi" (Japanese: ジュエル弁当マジカルチェンジ / 暴け！マジカル占いのヒミツ！ / 朔太郎のマジカルおとぎ話)	September 26, 2015
The magical change into a jewel bento: Curious about how Airi's school is like, Ruby used her magic to transform her and the jewelpets into character bentos. Uncovered! The Secret of the Magical Forture Telling: Ruby starts acting strange when she secretly does a forture telling making club. The Magical Fairy Tale of Sakutaro: In a parody of Cinderella, Sakutaro declines on going to a party, but when Ruby (who is a magical pumpkin fairy) shows him the delight of parties, he soon starts to enjoy himself.
27	"It was the fight of a young girl / It was too the fight of a young girl" Transliteration: "Sore wa otome no tatakaidatta / Sore mo otome no tatakaidatta" (Japanese: それは乙女の戦いだった / それも乙女の戦いだった)	October 3, 2015
It was the fight of a young girl: Sakutaro invites Luna to a bus trip to a part shop, but after Luna ate some sweet potatoes, she develops stomach issues and struggles not to pass gas. It was too the fight of a young girl After inviting Airi and her friends, Laura creates a scheme to frighten Airi and the jewelpets so she can be alone with Sakutaro.
28	"The Story of Jewel Land's Worst Pet Who Multiplied Her Magic by 40 in 10 Minutes and Restored the Jewel Castle / Jewel Castle, Magical Training Camp from Hell!"; Transliteration: "Juerurandobiri no petto ga 10-bu de mahō reberu o 40 agete jueru-jō o gen ni modoshita hanashi / Jueru-jō, jigoku no mahō gasshuku!" (Japanese: ジュエルランドビリのペットが10分で魔法レベルを40上げてジュエル城を元に戻した話 / ジュエル城、地獄の魔法合宿！)	October 10, 2015
The Story of Jewel Land's Worst Pet Who Multiplied Her Magic up to Level 40 in 10 Minutes and Restored the Jewel Castle: An unexpected visit from Opal causes the Jewelpets to undergo rigorous training to help restore the Jewel Castle. Jewel Castle, Magical Training Camp from Hell! After failing to restore the Jewel Castle, the Jewelpets undergo rigorous training. Meanwhile, Opal, Airi, and Laura speculate on a mural which holds a prophecy.
29	"The Idol In love" Transliteration: "Koisuru aidoru" (Japanese: 恋するアイドル)	October 17, 2015
Larimar, while in her human form, meets Souya, a boy who wants to ask her out on a date.
30	"My Own Big Brother... / Ruby and Luea's Decisive Battle, Mediterranean Style"; Transliteration: "Watashi no, o ani-sama… / Rubī vs. Rūa Chichūkai-fū daisakusen" (Japanese: わたしの、お兄さま… / ルビーVSルーア 地中海風大決戦)	October 24, 2015
My Own Big Brother...: Laura meets an Italian boy by the name of Mario who claims to be her older brother. In spite of this, she pines for Sakutaro. Ruby and Luea's Decisive Battle, Mediterranean Style: A follow-up to the previous episode, Laura, Luea, and Airi's Jewelpets go to rescue her and Sakutaro from Mario.
31	"The Hunt for Jewel Land's Treasure! / Invasion of the Pumpkin People!"; Transliteration: "Juerurando no hihō o oe! / Shūrai! Kabocha ningen" (Japanese: ジュエルランドの秘宝を追え！ / 襲来！カボチャ人間)	October 31, 2015
The Hunt for Jewel Land's Treasure: Airi receives a lithograph from her father by mail. Sapphie's translation reveals it to be a guide to a treasure, so she, Airi and her Jewelpets set out to find it. Invasion of the Pumpkin People!: The gang's celebration of Halloween is interrupted by the sudden appearance of mischievous living jack-o´-lanterns.
32	"The Jewelpets Are Here! Everyone's Reunited / The Glasses Are a Part Of Luna"; Transliteration: "Jueru pettoda ~yo! Zen'in shūgō/ Megane wa Runa no ichibudesu" (Japanese: ジュエルペットだョ！全員集合 / メガネはルナの一部です)	November 7, 2015
The Jewelpets Are Here! Everyone's Reunited: Ruby, Sapphie and Garnet set up a celebration for the Jewelpet franchise's 7th anniversary, but soon they realize that hardly anyone chose to attend. The Glasses Are a Part Of Luna: After failing to get Sakutaro's attention, Luna, along with the help of Garnet, chooses to change her image.
33	"Have I Become a Magical Girl!?"; Transliteration: "Mahō shōjo ni natchatta!?" (Japanese: 魔法少女になっちゃった！？)	November 14, 2015
When Airi touches the Magical Stone from her pendant, she turns into a magical girl; she ventures out to find what to wish for.
34	"Au Revoir, Laura / Hello, Hollywood Dream!"; Transliteration: "Oruvu~owāru, rōra / Harō, yume no Hariuddo de su!" (Japanese: オルヴォワール、ローラ / ハロー、夢のハリウッドでーす！)	November 21, 2015
Au Revoir, Laura: When Laura receives a letter from her father telling her to join him in France, she struggles to confess the matter to Sakutaro. Hello, Hollywood Dream!: Peridot is scouted by a famous movie director to perform in his upcoming movie. However, she worries that she won't be able to perform due to her not knowing English.
35	"Can We Magical Change With the Cool Watch? / I Want a Dream for the Future Labu~"; Transliteration: "Iketeruu~otchi de majikaruchenji? / Shōrai no yume ga hoshī ra bu~u~" (Japanese: イケテルウォッチでマジカルチェンジ？ / 将来の夢がほしいらぶぅ～)	November 28, 2015
Can We Magical Change With the Cool Watch?: Sakutarō and Luna have developed the Iketel Watch, which can be transformed many times. It was supposed to be the perfect magic, but there was an unusual thing in the body. I Want a Dream for the Future Labu~: Labra realizes that she has no future dreams.
36	"I Hate Airi!? / Sakutarō is Getting Married!?"; Transliteration: "Airi nante daikirai!? / Sakutarō, kekkon suru!?" (Japanese: あいりなんて大嫌い！？ / 朔太郎、結婚する！？)	December 5, 2015
I Hate Airi!?: Ruby and Airi have a regular fight. Laura and Luea seeing such a ruby suggests that Ruby and Luea should be switched. Sakutarō is Getting Married!?: The story of a matchmaking is too much romantic for Sakutaro. The partner is a woman named Maiko.
37	"Jewel Flash of Love"; Transliteration: "Koi no Jueru furasshu" (Japanese: 恋のジュエルフラッシュ)	December 12, 2015
Larimar climbs the stairs of the idol and finally talks about her CD debut at the Jewel Grape Museum. Larimar was even more enthusiastic about idol activities, but she was concerned about Aoya somewhere in her heart. It's time to decide whether to take a dream idol or love.
38	"Premonition of a Goodbye"; Transliteration: "Sayonara no Yokan" (Japanese: さよならの予感)	December 19, 2015
Christmas is coming soon. While the town was wrapped in a fun atmosphere, Ruby was unusually enthusiastic about Christmas. Meanwhile, Jewel Castle faces the greatest crisis. How can Jewel Land be saved? The key is Princess Jewellina!
39	"Until We Meet Again"; Transliteration: "Mata au Hi made" (Japanese: また会う日まで)	December 26, 2015
It has been seven years since Jewel Castle fell into the human world. The time has come for Jewel Castle to return. At the same time, the Jewelpets return to Jewel Land. The last Jewel Flash with everyone's feelings creates a miracle.
