= Sakura Komoriya =

Japanese singer (born 1999)

- 籠谷 さくら
- Born: 22 August 1999 (age 25); Hyōgo Prefecture, Japan
- Other names: Wī; Sakura (さくら)
- Occupations: Gravure idol; tarento; singer
- Years active: 2012–
- Modeling information
- Height: 160.2 cm (5 ft 3 in) (2015)

Sakura Komoriya (籠谷 さくら, Komoriya Sakura; born August 22, 1999) is a Japanese singer who was a member of the idol group X21. She has also appeared in television programmes and magazines. She is represented with the agency Aoi Corporation.

== Biography ==
She received a model award at the "13th All Japan National Bishoujo Contest" held in August 2012. She joined the band X21 that was formed mainly from the top winners of that contest and debuted in the entertainment world.

In June 2015, she was selected as a member of the idol unit Magical Dreamin' formed to sing the TV Tokyo anime Jewelpet: Magical Change opening theme.

== Works ==
=== CD ===
==== Singles ====
As Magical Dreamin

Date	Title	Label	No.
5 Aug 2015	Magical Change (Dorothy Little Happy Edition)	Avex Trax	AVCD-83343
5 Aug 2015	Magical Change (GEM Edition)	Avex Trax	AVCD-83344
5 Aug 2015	Magical Change (X21 Edition)	Avex Trax	AVCD-83345
5 Aug 2015	Magical Change (Included DVD)	Avex Trax	AVCD-83342

=== Image videos ===
Date	Title	Publisher	Ref.
23 Oct 2015	Pure Smile	Takeshobo	

== Filmography ==
=== Television ===
Dates	Title	Network	Notes
17, 25 Feb 2016, 1, 8 Mar 2017	Shin Nippon Puroresu Dai Sakusen DX	Samurai TV	#67, #68, #95, #96
2017–	Wide na Show	CX	Irregular as Waidona High School student
1–8 Jul 2017	2017 Natsu Kōkō Yakyū Saitama Taikai Team Shōkai	11 Saitama networks	
3 Jul 2017 –	Atarashī Nami 24	CX	MC
15–21 Jul 2017	Mezameyo! Kyūji!! Dai 99-kai Zenkoku Kōtō Gakkō Yakyū Senshuken Saitama Taikai Shiei Ōmiya Kyūjō Highlight	11 Saitama networks	

=== Radio ===
Date	Title	Network	Ref.
28 Jan 2014	Mayonaka no Harry & Ray	Radio Nippon	

=== Magazines ===
Date	Title	No.	Publisher
29 May 2017	Big Comic Spirits		Shogakukan
12 Jun 2017	Weekly Young Magazine	28	Kodansha
15 Jul 2017	Weekly Playboy	31	Shueisha

=== Image character ===
Title	Notes
"2017 Natsu Kōkō Yakyū Saitama Taikai Team Shōkai"	Official cheering character (11 cable TV companies in Saitama Prefecture) with Rina Matsuda, Saya Yamazaki, Yuri Kawaguchi

== See also ==
- X21 (band)
