= Tell Me, Tell Me! =

"Tell me tell me!!"

Single by Dorothy Little Happy
- B-side: Look at me; Yasashii Ame
- Released: May 20, 2015
- Recorded: 2015
- Genre: J-pop
- Label: avex trax
- Songwriter(s): Kana Shirato

Dorothy Little Happy singles chronology
"sky traveler" (2014)	"Tell me tell me!!" (2015)

"Tell me tell me!!" is a single by Japanese pop idol group Dorothy Little Happy. It is tenth official single by the group and the first song used in an Anime series. It was scheduled to be released on May 20, 2015 in three editions, two limited and one regular. "Tell me tell me!!" is used as the first ending song of the anime series Jewelpet: Magical Change.

== Production ==
Being the group's first single in 2015, the song was first hinted during the Dorothy Little Happy 5th Anniversary Year Live 2015 at the Zepp Blue Theater on March 15, 2015. It was then formally unveiled at the official press conference of the anime at Sanrio Puroland alongside the forming of the new group Magical☆Dreamin' alongside members of GEM and X21.

The single is released in three versions, the first two being limited editions and a regular edition. Both limited editions contain four tracks with the regular version includes a third extra soundtrack.

== Track listing ==
=== CD+DVD and CD Only Editions ===
CD
No.	Title	Length
1.	"Tell me tell me!!"
2.	"Yasashī ame (やさしい雨; lit. Gentle Rain)"
3.	"look at me (CD Version Only)"
4.	"Tell me tell me!! (Instrumental)"
5.	"Yasashī ame (Instrumental)"
6.	"look at me (Instrumental)"

CD+DVD Edition DVD
No.	Title	Length
1.	"Tell me tell me! (Music Video)"
