= Tell Me, Tell me =

Tell Me, Tell Me or Tell Me, Tell Me, Tell Me may refer to:

- Tell Me, Tell Me!, song by Dorothy Little Happy
- "Tell Me, Tell Me", song by Budgie from You're All Living in Cuckooland
- "Tell Me, Tell Me", B-side by Blur from "Sunday Sunday" single
- "Tell Me, Tell Me", song by Chaz Jankel from Looking at You
- "Tell Me Tell Me", song by Rainbow from mini album Rainbow Syndrome 2013
- "Tell Me, Tell Me, Tell Me", song by Brotherhood of Man from Oh Boy!
- "Tell Me, Tell Me (How Ya Like to be Loved)", song by Curtis Mayfield from Heartbeat
- "Tell Me, Tell Me, Tell Me", song by Look See Proof a five-piece indie pop-rock band from Hertfordshire
- "Tell Me, Tell Me, Tell Me" (Lyrics: Arudra; Singers: S. P. Balasubramanyam and S. Janaki) America Ammayi
