= Kolme (group) =

Japanese idol girl group

- Also known as: Callme
- Origin: Japan
- Genres: J-pop
- Years active: 2015–present
- Labels: Avex Trax
- Spinoff of: Dorothy Little Happy
- Members: Ruuna; Mimori; Koumi
- Website: avex.jp/kolme/

Kolme (コールミー), formerly known as Callme, is a Japanese idol girl group consisting of former Dorothy Little Happy members. They released their debut single, "To shine", in March 2015.

== History ==
The formation of Callme was announced on December 30, 2014, at the final performance of Dorothy Little Happy's 2014 Winter Tour. Their first single, "To shine", was released on March 4, 2015. On July 12, all three members of Callme graduated from Dorothy Little Happy to focus on Callme activities. They released their first album, Who is callme? on October 28. Their second single, "Can not change nothing", was released on April 6, 2016, followed by their third single, "Confession", on June 29. They released their second album, This is callme, on September 28. Their fourth single, "Bring you happiness", was released on March 22, 2017, followed by their fifth single, "One time", on August 9. Their sixth single, "Hello No Buddy", was released on March 7, 2018. On September 29, Callme changed their name to Kolme. They released their third album, Hello Kolme, on January 30, 2019. Their fourth album, Do you know kolme?, was released on November 20, 2019. On January 26, 2022, they released their first EP, Hajimete No Mini Album.

== Members ==
- Ruuna Akimoto (秋元瑠海)
- Mimori Tominaga (富永美杜)
- Koumi Hayasaka (早坂香美)

== Discography ==
=== Studio albums ===
| Title | Album details | Peak chart positions | |
| Title | Album details | Oricon | Hot |
|---|---|---|---|
| Who is callme? | Released: October 28, 2015; Label: Avex Trax; Formats: CD, digital download | 72 | — |
| This is callme | Released: September 28, 2016; Label: Avex Trax; Formats: CD, digital download | 30 | 86 |
| Hello kolme | Released: January 30, 2019; Label: Avex Trax; Formats: CD, digital download | 39 | 93 |
| Do you know kolme? | Released: November 20, 2019; Label: Avex Trax; Formats: CD, digital download | 93 | — |

=== Singles ===
| Title | Year | Peak chart positions | Album |
| Title | Year | Oricon | Album |
|---|---|---|---|
| "To shine" | 2015 | 10 | Non-album single |
| "Can not change nothing" | 2016 | 12 | This is callme |
| "Confession" | 2016 | 12 | This is callme |
| "Bring you happiness" | 2017 | 20 | Non-album single |
| "One time" | 2017 | 28 | Hello kolme |
| "Hello No Buddy" | 2018 | 42 | Hello kolme |
