= List of Rilu Rilu Fairilu episodes =

This is a list of episodes for the Japanese anime television series Rilu Rilu Fairilu animated by Studio Deen.

The first season, titled Rilu Rilu Fairilu: Yōsei no Door (Japanese: リルリルフェアリル ～妖精のドア～, Hepburn: Riru Riru Feariru: Yōsei no Doa; Rilu Rilu Fairilu: The Fairy's Door), began airing on all TXN stations in Japan between February 6, 2016, and March 25, 2017, replacing Jewelpet: Magical Change on its initial timeslot. It is directed by Sakura Gojō and written by Aya Matsui (Boys Over Flowers, Marmalade Boy, Tamagotchi!).

A second season, titled Rilu Rilu Fairilu: Mahō no Kagami (Japanese: リルリルフェアリル～魔法の鏡～, Hepburn: Riru Riru Feariru: Mahō no Kagami; Rilu Rilu Fairilu: Magical Mirror) was announced by Sanrio via the anime's official Twitter account, began airing on April 7, 2017, and ended on March 30, 2018. It is directed by Sakura Gojō and Nana Imanaka, written by Akemi Omode.

A third season, titled Oshiete Mahō no Pendulum: Rilu Rilu Fairilu (Japanese: おしえて魔法のペンデュラム ～リルリルフェアリル～, Hepburn: Oshiete Mahō no Penduramu: Riru Riru Feariru; "Tell Me, Magical Pendulum: Rilu Rilu Fairilu") began airing on Kids Station, Animax and Tokyo MX – with the premiere dates respectively being July 7, July 8, and July 15, 2018. It ended on January 5, 2019. The third season is directed by Chisei Maeda and written by Akemi Omode.

== Rilu Rilu Fairilu: Yōsei no Door ==
The opening theme is "Brand New Days" by Apink as their fifth Japanese Single. The first ending theme is "Key of Life" by Shiggy Jr., while the second is "Kera Kera Acchi Muite Hoi!" (Japanese: ケラケラあっちむいてホイ!; "Kera Kera, Face that Way!") by Kera Kera, and the third is "Rilu Rilu Wonderful Girl!" by Yumiri Hanamori, Rina Hidaka, Aya Uchida and Aina Kusuda.

| No. | Title | Original release date |
|---|---|---|
| 1 | "Birth of the Tulip Fairilu! / The Saint Fairilu School's First Lesson" "Tanjō! Chūrippu no Feariru / Seinto Feariru Sukūru Saisho no Jugyō" (誕生！チューリップのフェアリル / 聖フェアリルスクール 最初の授業) | February 6, 2016 |
| 2 | "A House of Bouquets! The Flower Fairilu Village / Himawari & Sumire's first Fairilu Magic" "Hanataba no Ouchi! Furawā Feariru no Mura / Himawari & Sumire Saisho no Feariru Majikku" (花束のおうち！フラワーフェアリルの村 / ひまわり＆すみれ 最初のフェアリルマジック) | February 13, 2016 |
| 3 | "Rose is a Slump! / Himawari is Everyone's Favorite" "Rōzu, Suranpu desu wa! / Himawari wa Minna no Ninkimono" (ローズ、スランプですわ! / ひまわりはみんなの人気者) | February 20, 2016 |
| 4 | "We are too Beautiful / Do Your Best, Kirara & Yurara!" "Utsukushi Sugiru Atashi-tachi / Kirara & Yurara, Oshigoto Ganbaru yo~" (美しすぎるアタシたち / きらら＆ゆらら、お仕事がんばるよ～) | February 27, 2016 |
| 5 | "Sumire, the Rain, and Old Letter / The Shy Mashu Sisters" "Sumire to Ame to Furui Tegami / Masshu Shisutāzu wa Hazukashigariya" (すみれと雨と古い手紙 / マッシュシスターズは恥ずかしがりや) | March 5, 2016 |
| 6 | "Suzuran & Lip's Forbidden Journey! / More Rivals!? The Mermaid Fairilus" "Suzuran & Rippu Kinjirareta Bōken! / Matamata Raibaru!? Māmeido Feariru" (すずらん＆りっぷ禁じられた冒険！ / またまたライバル！？マーメイドフェアリル) | March 12, 2016 |
| 7 | "Magic Test! / Where's the Door?" "Mahō no Tesuto! / Doa wa Doko ni aru?" (魔法のテスト！ / ドアはどこにある？) | March 19, 2016 |
| 8 | "Fairilu Festival! / Bloom Bloom, Sakura!" "Feariru Fesutibaru! / Sake Sake, Sakura!" (フェアリルフェスティバル！ / 咲け咲け、さくら！) | March 26, 2016 |
| 9 | "I Love Rose! / Fairilu Easter" "Rōzu ga Daisuki! / Feariru īsutā" (ローズが大好き！ / フェアリルイースター) | April 2, 2016 |
| 10 | "The Fairilu Who Lost Their Wings / Open! Treecut House" "Hane o Shitsukushita Feariru / Kaiten! Tsurīkatto Hausu" (羽を失くしたフェアリル / 開店!ツリーカットハウス) | April 9, 2016 |
| 11 | "Rilu Rilu Bubble Rilu! / Teacher Leon's Makeover Academy" "Riru Riru Shabo Riru! / Reon-sensei no Henshingaku" (リルリルシャボリル! / レオン先生の変身学) | April 16, 2016 |
| 12 | "What is this Heartbeat!? / We are Just Beautiful" "Kono Doki-doki tte Nani!? / Utsukushi sugiru Bokutachi sa" (このドキドキって何!? / 美しすぎるボクたちさ～) | April 23, 2016 |
| 13 | "Exclusive! Beniyako News / The Other Side of the Fairilu Door" "Tokudane! Beniyako Shinbun / Feariru Doa no Kochiragawa" (特ダネ！ベニヤコ新聞 / フェアリルドアのこちら側) | April 30, 2016 |
| 14 | "Teacher Kingyo's Study of Love / Grandma's Memories" "Kingyo-sensei no Ren'ai Gaku / Obāchan no Omoide" (きんぎょ先生の恋愛学 / おばあちゃんの思い出) | May 7, 2016 |
| 15 | "The Mysterious Handsome Coach Appears! Battle of Shaboriru" "Nazo no Ikemen Kōchi Tōjō! Shaboriru no Tatakai" (謎のイケメンコーチ登場!シャボリルの戦い) | May 14, 2016 |
| 16 | "The Mysterious Kasumi / The Fairilu Candy Riot" "Fushigina Kasumi / Feariru Kyandi Sōdō" (不思議なかすみ / フェアリルキャンディ騒動) | May 21, 2016 |
| 17 | "What is this Thing called Love? / Dante vs. Akiakane: The Unicorn Race Showdown" "Koi to wa Dō Iu Mono Kashira / Dante vs. Akiakane: Yunikōn Rēsu Taiketsu" (恋とはどういうものかしら / ダンテvs.アキアカネ ユニコーンレース対決) | May 28, 2016 |
| 18 | "Rain Day from Today! / Beautiful Handsome Dance!" "Kyō Rara Rein Dē! / Ikemenjodansu de Byu~tifo~!" (今日からレインデー! / イケメンジョダンスでビュ～チフォ～!) | June 4, 2016 |
| 19 | "Ajisai's Colorful Magic! / A Fierce Battle! Veggie Cooking!" "Ajisai Karafuru Majikku! / Nettō! Beji Kukkingu!" (あじさいカラフルマジック！/ 熱闘！ベジクッキング！) | June 11, 2016 |
| 20 | "Pet Showoff at the Friendship Festival / Azami and Sister Rose!?" "Jiman no Petto! Nakayoshi Fesutibaru / Azami to Rōzu-nēsan!?" (自慢のペット！なかよしフェスティバル / アザミとローズ姐さん！？) | June 11, 2016 |
| 21 | "The Extracurricular Lesson! Their Destination is Big Humalu!? / Fairilu Change Humalu Transformation!" "Kagai Jugyō! Yukusaki wa Biggu Hyūmaru!? / Feariru Chenji de Hyūmaru ni Henshin!" (課外授業!行先はビッグヒューマル！？ / フェアリルチェンジでヒューマルに変身！) | June 25, 2016 |
| 22 | "Welcome to Big Humalu" "Yōkoso, Biggu Hyūmaru e" (ようこそ、ビッグヒューマルへ) | July 2, 2016 |
| 23 | "Big Humalu is Full of Danger?" "Biggu Hyūmaru wa Kiken ga ippai?" (ビッグヒューマルは危険がいっぱい？) | July 9, 2016 |
| 24 | "A Pretty Clothing Store / I Want To Meet Nozomu..." "Sutekina Oyōpuku-ya-san / Nozomu ni Aitai..." (すてきなお洋服屋さん / 望に会いたい…) | July 16, 2016 |
| 25 | "Kabuto and Kuwa's Dreams! / Star Starry Sky Stage" "Kabuto to Kuwa Yume! / Sutā ☆ Hoshizora Sutēji" (カブトとクワの夢! / スター☆星空ステージ) | July 23, 2016 |
| 26 | "Kinshi's Counsel Room / The Sea Candle Castle Invitation" "Kinshi no Onayami Sōdanshitsu / Shī Kyandoru-jō kara no Jōtaijō" (きんしのお悩み相談室 / シーキャンドル城からの招待状) | July 30, 2016 |
| 27 | "Purely, Fairly, and Beautiful! / The Big Adventure in the Old Ruins!" "Kiyoku, Tadashiku, Utsukushiku desu wa! / Kodai Iseki de Daibōken da〜!" (清く正しく美しくですわっ! / 古代遺跡で大冒険だ〜!) | August 6, 2016 |
| 28 | "Durian Returns! Let's Make Delicious Cuisine / It's Summer! Beautiful! Ikemenjo Land!" "Dorian Kaeru! Tsukurou Oishī Ryōri / Natsu da! Byu~chifo~! Ikemenjo Rando!" (ドリアン帰る！作ろう美味しい料理 / 夏だ！ビュ〜チフォ〜！イケメンジョランド！) | August 13, 2016 |
| 29 | "Powa-Powa Summer Camp! / Olive's Tear" "Powa-Powa Samā Kyanpu! / Orību no Namida" (ぽわぽわサマーキャンプ！/ オリーブの涙) | August 20, 2016 |
| 30 | "The Fairilu Door of Fate / I Become an Idol-rilu!" "Unmei no Feariru Doa / Watashi, Aidoru ni naru-riru!" (運命のフェアリルドア / 私、アイドルになるリル！) | August 27, 2016 |
| 31 | "St. Fairilu School's Staff Meeting" "Seinto Feariru Sukūru no Shokuin Kaigi" (聖フェアリルスクールの職員会議) | September 3, 2016 |
| 32 | "Spider's Black Magic! / Revealed! The Secret of Bijou!?" "Supaidā no Kokumajutsu! / Abake! Bijū no Himitsu!?" (スパイダーの黒魔術！/ あばけ!ビジューの秘密！？) | September 10, 2016 |
| 33 | "The Mush Sisters are in a Fight / Tomato and Carrot, Bon Appétit" "Masshushi Sutāzu no Shimai Genka dani / Tomato ni Kyarotto, Dōzo Meshiagare" (マッシュシスターズの姉妹ゲンカだに / トマトにキャロット、どうぞ召し上がれ) | September 17, 2016 |
| 34 | "Sumire's Fashion Show!" "Sumire no Fasshon Shō!" (すみれのファッションショー!) | September 24, 2016 |
| 35 | "A Decisive Battle! Big Unicorn Race! / Olive & Higan: The Couple's Adventure" "Kessen! Dai Yunikōn Rēsu! / Orību & Higan: Futarikiri no Bōken" (決戦!大ユニコーンレース! / オリーブ＆ひがん 二人きりの冒険) | October 1, 2016 |
| 36 | "Humalu and Fairilu Can't Love Each Other?" "Hyūmaru to Feariru wa Koi ga Dekinai no?" (ヒューマルとフェアリルは恋ができないの？) | October 8, 2016 |
| 37 | "Let's Sing! Mr. Kanaria's Chorus Lesson / Let's Create our School Song" "Minna de Utaō! Kanaria-sensei no Gasshō-gaku / Kōka o Tsukurou" (みんなで歌おう カナリア先生の合唱学 / 校歌をつくろう) | October 15, 2016 |
| 38 | "The Two of Us are Vegetablun! / The Guardian of Rare Bijou, Ofuku" "Futari wa Bejitaburun! / Rea Bijū no Mamorite Ofuku-san" (ふたりはベジタブルン！/ レアビジューの守り手 おふくさん) | October 22, 2016 |
| 39 | "Little Fairilu's Halloween Night / Big Humalu's Happy Halloween" "Ritoru Feariru no Harouin Naito / Biggu Hyūmaru no Happī Harouin" (リトルフェアリルのハロウィンナイト / ビッグヒューマルのハッピーハロウィン) | October 29, 2016 |
| 40 | "Welcome to Fairilu House / Heroes of Love! Ikemenjo Five!" "Feariruhausu e Yōkoso / Ai no Hīrō! Ikemenjo Faibu!" (フェアリルハウスへようこそ / 愛のヒーロー！イケメンジョファイブ！) | November 5, 2016 |
| 41 | "Kamakiri, Having a High Aspiration! / Fairilu Thanks Festival" "Kamakiri yo, Taishi o Dake! / Feariru Kansha-sai" (カマキリよ、大志を抱け！/ フェアリル感謝祭) | November 12, 2016 |
| 42 | "Himawari & Dante: Going to Big Humalu!" "Himawari & Dante Biggu Hyūmaru e!" (ひまわり＆ダンテ ビッグヒューマルへ！) | November 19, 2016 |
| 43 | "Playing with Fairilu!? The Pad of Magic / Akoya's Model Debut!" "Feariru to Asoberu!? Mahō no Paddo/ Akoya, Moderu Debyū!" (フェアリルとあそべる！？まほうのパッド / あこや、モデルデビュー！) | November 26, 2016 |
| 44 | "Aurora's Curtain of Dream / Burn, Hopper! Proposal Operation!?" "Ōrora, Yume no Kāten / Moero, Hoppā! Puropōzu Daisakusen!?" (オーロラ、夢のカーテン / 燃えろホッパー！プロポーズ大作戦！？) | December 3, 2016 |
| 45 | "Let's Make Christmas Star!" "Kurisumasu Sutā o Tsukurou!" (クリスマススターをつくろう！) | December 10, 2016 |
| 46 | "Do Your Best! Santa's Disciples / Miracle of Christmas Eve! A Present from Lip" "Ganbare! Santa no o Deshi-san / Ibu no Kiseki! Rippu kara no Purezento" (がんばれ！サンタのお弟子さん / イブの奇跡！りっぷからのプレゼント) | December 17, 2016 |
| 47 | "Jewelpet! Guests from the Magical Kingdom!" "Juerupetto! Mahō no Kuni kara Kita Okyakusama!" (ジュエルペット！魔法の国から来たお客様！) | December 24, 2016 |
| 48 | "Celery & Noumu's Encounter in the Skating Rink / Oyuki's Friend" "Serori & Nōmu Ginban no Deai! / Oyuki no Tomodachi" (セロリ＆ノーム 銀盤の出会い！/ おゆきのともだち) | January 7, 2017 |
| 49 | "A Big Pinch! Everyone Becomes Babies!" "Dai Pinchi! Min'na Akachan ni natchatta!" (大ピンチ！みんな赤ちゃんになっちゃった！) | January 14, 2017 |
| 50 | "The Fairilu Door of Dream / Birth of the First Buddy" "Yume no Feariru Doa / Hajimete no Badi Tanjō" (夢のフェアリルドア / はじめてのバディ誕生) | January 21, 2017 |
| 51 | "Olive's Determination / Himawari & Dante: The New Bond" "Orību no Ketsui / Himawari & Dante: Aratana Kizuna" (オリーブの決意 / ひまわり&ダンテ 新たな絆) | January 28, 2017 |
| 52 | "Even if It is a Love That Can't be Fulfilled..." "Tatoe Musubarenai Koi da to shite mo..." (たとえ結ばれない恋だとしても。。。) | February 4, 2017 |
| 53 | "Little Fairilu's Valentine's Day / The First and Last Time!? Lip's Valentine" "Ritoru Feariru no Barentain Dē / Saisho de Saigo!? Rippu no Barentain" (リトルフェアリルのバレンタインデー / 最初で最後！？りっぷのバレンタイン) | February 11, 2017 |
| 54 | "Never Give Up! Lip's Challenge to the Dream" "Akiramenai! Rippu, Yume e no Charenji!" (あきらめない！りっぷ、夢へのチャレンジ！) | February 18, 2017 |
| 55 | "I Want to Protect! The Connected Feelings of The Duo" "Mamoritai! Tsunagaru Futari no Omoi" (守りたい！つながる二人の思い) | February 25, 2017 |
| 56 | "The Separated World and Duo of Fate!" "Wakareru Sekai to Unmei no Futari!" (別れる世界と運命の二人!) | March 4, 2017 |
| 57 | "The Crisis of Big Humalu: There are No Fairilus!" "Bigguhyūmaru no Kiki, Feariru Nante inai!" (ビッグヒューマルの危機、フェアリルなんていない！) | March 11, 2017 |
| 58 | "Rilu Rilu Fairilu! The Flower Language of Anchusa!" "Riru Riru Feariru! Anchūsa no Hanakotoba!" (リルリルフェアリル！アンチューサの花言葉！) | March 18, 2017 |
| 59 | "Fairilu Award for Everyone!" "Minna de Feariru Awādo!" (みんなでフェアリルアワード！) | March 25, 2017 |

== Rilu Rilu Fairilu: Mahō no Kagami ==
The first opening theme of this series is "Papipupe Pon!" (Japanese: ぱぴぷぺPON!) by Apink as their seventh Japanese Single together with their song "Bye Bye", while the second is "Sakura Saku Aoi Haru" (Japanese: さくら咲く青い春; Blue Spring With Cherry Blossom Flowers) by Silent Siren. The first and second ending themes are respectively "Onegai Rosie" (Japanese: お願いロジー, Hepburn: Onegai Rojī; Please Rosie) and "Fairy Smile" by Q-Pitch.

| No. | Title | Original release date |
|---|---|---|
| 60 | "New Friends!! New Bond!!" "Atarashī Nakama!! Atarashī kizuna!!" (新しい仲間！！新しい絆！！) | April 7, 2017 |
| 61 | "A New School Term Starts!" "Shin Gakki ga Hajimaru yo!" (新学期がはじまるよ！) | April 14, 2017 |
| 62 | "Fairilu Magical Pharmacy, Professor Mush Appears / Rin's First Holiday" "Feariru Mahō Yakugaku, Masshu Kyōju Tōjō / Rin, Hajimete no Oyasumi" (フェアリル魔法薬学、マッシュ教授登場 / りん、はじめてのお休み) | April 21, 2017 |
| 63 | "Can I Make Friends? Karen's Exciting New School Term" "Tomodachi dekiru kana? Karen no Doki-doki Shin Gakki" (友達できるかな？かれんのドキドキ新学期) | April 28, 2017 |
| 64 | "Scary Scary! Teachers of Dark Magicology! / The Dorm's Night is Full of Wonder!" "Kowai Kowai! Yami Mahō Gaku no Sensei! / Ryō no Yoru wa Fushigi ga Ippai!" (こわ～いこわい！闇魔法学の先生！ / 寮の夜はフシギがいっぱい！) | May 5, 2017 |
| 65 | "Debut! Fairy Idol Yumiri!" "Debyū! Feadoru Yumiri!" (デビュー！フェアドルゆみり！) | May 12, 2017 |
| 66 | "Magical Dressmaking Lesson, Ms. Sheep Appears / Welcome to Jonmeke's Lesson of the Art of Funniness!" "Mahō Yōsai-gaku, Shīpu-sensei Tōjō / Jonmeke no Owarai-gaku e, Yōkoso!" (魔法洋裁学、シィプ先生登場 / ジョンメケのお笑い学へ、ようこそ！) | May 19, 2017 |
| 67 | "Rin Has Been Caught!?" "Rin ga Tsukamatchatta!?" (りんが捕まっちゃった！？) | May 26, 2017 |
| 68 | "Switched Bodies with Magic Mirror!" "Mahō no Kagami de Irekawatchatta!" (魔法の鏡で入れ替わっちゃった！) | June 2, 2017 |
| 69 | "Secret Pajama Party! / Magic Battle!? Don & Kuri Return!" "Himitsu no Pajāma Pātī! / Mahō taiketsu!? Kaettekita Don & Kuri!" (ヒミツのパジャーマパーティー！ / 魔法対決！？帰ってきたドン＆くり！) | June 9, 2017 |
| 70 | "Colourful Magical Peacock! / The Strict Dorm Manager Mrs. Serpent!" "Karafuru Majikaru Pīkokku! / Kibishii Ryōchō Misesu Seruban!" (カラフルマジカルピーコック！ / きびし～い寮長、ミセスセルバン！) | June 16, 2017 |
| 71 | "Akoya's Feelings! The Dream-Fulfilling Doughnuts!" "Akoya no Omoi! Yume o Kanaeru Dōnattsu!" (あこやの思い！夢をかなえるドーナッツ！) | June 23, 2017 |
| 72 | "Fly in the Sky with Fairilu Keys!" "Feariru Kī de Sora o Tobou!" (フェアリルキーで空を飛ぼう！) | June 30, 2017 |
| 73 | "Wish Upon A Star / Olive's Training" "Hoshi ni Negai o / Orību no Shugyō" (星に願いを / オリーブの修行) | July 7, 2017 |
| 74 | "The Music for You" "Anata e no Ongaku" (あなたへの音楽) | July 14, 2017 |
| 75 | "Became Bigger with Magic Mirror!" "Mahō no Kagami de ōkiku Natchatta!" (魔法の鏡で大きくなっちゃった！) | July 21, 2017 |
| 76 | "Fairilu Key and Buddy's Magic" "Fearirukī to Badi no Mahō" (フェアリルキーとバディの魔法) | July 28, 2017 |
| 77 | "Mush Café in Big Humalu!" "Biggu Hyūmaru de Masshu Kafe Dani!" (ビッグヒューマルでマッシュカフェだに！) | August 4, 2017 |
| 78 | "Rilu Rilu Fairilu Jewel Flash in Jewel Land!" "Jueru Rando de Riru Riru Feariru Jueru Furasshu!" (ジュエルランドでリルリルフェアリルジュエルフラッシュ！) | August 11, 2017 |
| 79 | "Karen's First Summer Camp!" "Karen, Hajimete no Samā Kyanpu!" (かれん、はじめてのサマーキャンプ！) | August 18, 2017 |
| 80 | "Let's Go to Nozomu's School!" "Nozomu-san no Gakkō e Ikō!" (望さんの学校へ行こう！) | August 25, 2017 |
| 81 | "Fill the Fairilu Tiara with Feelings" "Feariru Tiara ni Omoi o Komete" (フェアリルティアラに想いを込めて) | September 1, 2017 |
| 82 | "The Gift of Time Travel" "Jikan Ryokō no Okurimono" (時間旅行の贈り物) | September 8, 2017 |
| 83 | "Rin the Sleeping Beauty" "Nemuri Hime Rin-chan" (眠り姫りんちゃん) | September 15, 2017 |
| 84 | "I Became Unable to Fly!" "Tobenaku Natchatta!" (飛べなくなっちゃった！) | September 22, 2017 |
| 85 | "Let's Keep Our Memories in the Magicalbum!" "Majikarubamu de Mmoide o Nokosou!" (マジカルバムで思い出を残そう！) | September 29, 2017 |
| 86 | "So Many Idols: Fruits Island / Idol in Love! The Operation of Getting Lovedokari?" "Aidoru ga Ippai: Furūtsu Shima / Koisuru Aidoru! Rabudokari Getto Daisakusen?" (アイドルがいっぱい フルーツ島 / 恋するアイドル！ラブドカリゲット大作戦？) | October 6, 2017 |
| 87 | "Teacher Megane's Fairilu History Lesson / Counselling Showdown with Otama!" "Megane Tīchā no Feariru Rekishi Gaku / Otama-san to o Nayami Sōdan Taiketsu!" (メガネティーチャーのフェアリル歴史学 / おタマさんとお悩み相談対決！) | October 13, 2017 |
| 88 | "Karen's Dream and Grandma's Promise in the Distant Past" "Karen no Yume, Obāchan no Tōi Hi no Yakusoku" (かれんの夢、おばあちゃんの遠い日の約束) | October 20, 2017 |
| 89 | "Let's Learn to Play Pranks! Vampire Halloween!" "Itazura o Manabou! Vanpaia Harowin!" (イタズラを学ぼう！ヴァンパイアハロウィン！) | October 27, 2017 |
| 90 | "The Melody of Memories" "Omoide no Merodī" (思い出のメロディー) | November 3, 2017 |
| 91 | "Become Lucky! Kaiko-chan's Silk Cloths / Magical Fairilu School's Arts Festival!" "Shiawase ni narou! Kaiko-chan no Kinuorimono / Majikaru Feariru Sukūru no Gakugei-kai!" (幸運になろう！かいこちゃんの絹織物 / マジカルフェアリルスクールの学芸会！) | November 10, 2017 |
| 92 | "Starry World Studies, Mr. Dora Appears / Spider's Amazing Black Magic!" "Hoshi Sekai Gaku, Dora-sensei Tōjō / Supaidā no Sugoi Kuromajutsu!" (星世界学、ドラ先生登場 / スパイダーのすごい黒魔術！) | November 17, 2017 |
| 93 | "Madame Neko's Wedding Ceremony / Dante & Haruto, The Promise of Men!" "Neko Fujin no Kekkonshiki / Dante & Haruto, Otoko no yakusoku!" (ネコ夫人の結婚式 / ダンテ&ハルト、男の約束！) | November 24, 2017 |
| 94 | "Sango's Diet Operation! / Deliver It! Fly-in-the-Sky Chorus Contest!" "Sango no Daietto Daisakusen! / Todoke! Sora-tobu Gasshō Konkūru!" (サンゴのダイエット大作戦！ / 届け！空飛ぶ合唱コンクール！) | December 1, 2017 |
| 95 | "Spinning Magical Rolling Egg!" "Kuru-kuru Majikaru Koro-koro Tamago!" (くるくるマジカルころころタマゴ！) | December 8, 2017 |
| 96 | "Nozomu's Dream and Lip's Confusion" "Nozomu no Yume, Rippu no Mayoi" (望の夢、りっぷの迷い) | December 15, 2017 |
| 97 | "Merry Fairilu Christmas" "Merī Feariru Kurisumasu" (メリーフェアリルクリスマス) | December 22, 2017 |
| 98 | "Decide the Giant No.1!? / Kabuto and Kuwa's Dream Game!" "Jaianto No. 1 o Kimero!? / Kabuto to Kuwa no Yume no Gēmu!" (ジャイアントNo.1を決めろ！？ / カブトとクワの、夢のゲーム！) | January 5, 2018 |
| 99 | "The Songstress in the Dream / Grow Our Bonds! Magical Creature Raising Lesson" "Yume no Naka no Utahime / Kizuna Fukamaru! Mahō Seibutsu Shiikugaku" (夢の中の歌姫 / きずな深まる！魔法生物飼育学) | January 12, 2018 |
| 100 | "So Many Detectives! Search for the Disappeared Sweets! / Nozomu's Buddy Gathering" "Tantei Ippai! Kieta Suītsu o Sagase! / Nozomu no Badi Kōryū-kai" (探偵いっぱい！消えたスイーツを探せ！ / 望のバディ交流会) | January 19, 2018 |
| 101 | "Ageha and Friends Go to Little Fairilu!" "Ageha-tachi, Ritoru Feariru e!" (アゲハたち、リトルフェアリルへ！) | January 26, 2018 |
| 102 | "Aim to be Gold Bijouist!" "Mezase! Gōrudo Bijurisuto!" (めざせ！ゴールドビジュリスト！) | February 2, 2018 |
| 103 | "Karen and Everyone's Kamishibai / The Song of Regeneration, Sea, Stars, Flowers, and Dreams..." "Karen to Minna no Kamishibai / Saisei no Uta, Umi to Hoshi to Hana to Yume to..." (かれんとみんなの紙しばい / 再生の唄、海と星と花と夢と。。。) | February 9, 2018 |
| 104 | "Lip's Determination, Become Fairilu Diva!" "Rippu no Ketsui, Feariru Dīva ni naru!" (りっぷの決意、フェアリルディーヴァになる！) | February 16, 2018 |
| 105 | "Farewell, Yumiri! The Last Live with Tears!" "Sayonara Yumiri, Namida no Rasuto Raibu!" (さよならゆみり、涙のラストライブ！) | February 23, 2018 |
| 106 | "The Magic Mirror Has Been Taken!" "Mahō no Kagami ga Ubawareta!" (魔法の鏡がうばわれた！) | March 2, 2018 |
| 107 | "The Secret Door in the Heart" "Kokoro no Naka no Himitsu no Tobira" (こころの中のヒミツの扉) | March 9, 2018 |
| 108 | "Nozomu's Determination, a Creeping Anxiety" "Nozomu no Ketsui, Shinobiyoru Fuan" (望の決意、忍び寄る不安) | March 16, 2018 |
| 109 | "Sui's Despair and Nozomu's Hope..." "Sui no Zetsubō, Nozomu no Kibō..." (スイの絶望、望の希望。。。) | March 23, 2018 |
| 110 | "Deliver the Song of Regeneration, Lip and Nozomu's Bond" "Todoke Saisei no Uta, Rippu to Nozomu no Kizuna" (届け再生の唄、りっぷと望の絆) | March 30, 2018 |

== Oshiete Mahō no Pendulum: Rilu Rilu Fairilu ==
The opening theme is "Oshiete Mahō no Pendulum" (Japanese: おしえて魔法のペンデュラム, Hepburn: Oshiete Mahō no Penduramu; "Tell Me, Magical Pendulum") by Yumiri Hanamori and Ari Ozawa, with the former singing the ending theme "Suki" no Katachi (Japanese: 「好き」のカタチ; Shape of Like).

| No. | Title | Original release date |
|---|---|---|
| 111 | "Can I Make Friends?" "Tomodachi dekiru kana?" (友達できるかな？) | July 7, 2018 |
| 112 | "I Can't Speak In Public!" "Hitomae de Hanasenai!" (ひとまえで話せない！) | July 14, 2018 |
| 113 | "I Don't Want to Study" "Benkyō Nante shitakunai" (勉強なんてしたくない) | July 21, 2018 |
| 114 | "How Does Love Feel Like?" "Sukitte, Donna Mono kashira?" (好きって、どんなものかしら？) | July 28, 2018 |
| 115 | "Rainy Day is Boring!" "Ame no Hi tte Taikutsu!" (雨の日ってたいくつ！) | August 4, 2018 |
| 116 | "Want to be Fashionable!" "Oshare ni naritai!" (おしゃれになりたい！) | August 11, 2018 |
| 117 | "Is it Strange to be Different From Others?" "Min'na to Chigau no wa Hen nano?" (みんなと違うのは変なの？) | August 18, 2018 |
| 118 | "I Can't be Honest" "Sunao ni narenakute" (素直になれなくて) | August 25, 2018 |
| 119 | "Don't be Crying!" "Naicha dame!" (泣いちゃダメ！) | September 1, 2018 |
| 120 | "There's Something I Don't Want to Do!" "Yaritakunai koto ga aru no!" (やりたくないことがあるの！) | September 8, 2018 |
| 121 | "We had a Quarrel!" "Kenka shichatta!" (喧嘩しちゃった！) | September 15, 2018 |
| 122 | "Want to be Cute!" "Kawaiku naritai!" (かわいくなりたい！) | September 22, 2018 |
| 123 | "There's Something I Hate Eating" "Kirai na Tabemono ga aru no" (嫌いな食べ物があるの) | September 29, 2018 |
| 124 | "I'll Support My Friend's Love!" "Tomodachi no Koi, ōen suru yo!" (友達の恋、応援するよ！) | October 6, 2018 |
| 125 | "I Want to Believe" "Shinjite Hoshī no" (信じて欲しいの) | October 13, 2018 |
| 126 | "As This is Something I Like" "Suki na koto dakara" (好きなことだから) | October 20, 2018 |
| 127 | "Release Yourself" "Jibun o Kaihō shite" (自分を解放して) | October 27, 2018 |
| 128 | "Take a Deep Breath" "Shinkokyū shite" (深呼吸して) | November 3, 2018 |
| 129 | "Have Confidence!" "Jishin o Motte!" (自信を持って!) | November 10, 2018 |
| 130 | "A Deep Bond" "Fukamaru Kizuna" (深まる絆) | November 17, 2018 |
| 131 | "Don't Give Up" "Akiramenaide" (あきらめないで) | November 24, 2018 |
| 132 | "Stop for a While Sometimes" "Toki ni wa Tachi Tomatte" (時には立ち止まって) | December 1, 2018 |
| 133 | "As it Surely will be Connected" "Kitto Tsunagatteiru kara" (きっと繋がっているから) | December 8, 2018 |
| 134 | "Put in Your Thoughts" "Omoi o Komete" (想いを込めて) | December 15, 2018 |
| 135 | "Towards Your Dream!" "Yume ni Mukatte!" (夢に向かって！) | December 22, 2018 |
| 136 | "Until the Day When Wish Comes True" "Negai no Kanau Hi Made" (願いの叶う日まで) | January 5, 2019 |
