= List of Lady Jewelpet episodes =

- No. of episodes: 52

Release
- Original network: TV Tokyo, TV Osaka
- Original release: April 5, 2014 – March 28, 2015

Series chronology
- ← Previous; Jewelpet Happiness Next → Jewelpet: Magical Change

Lady Jewelpet (レディ ジュエルペット, Redi Juerupetto) is the sixth installment of the Jewelpet anime franchise created by Sanrio and Sega and animated by both Zexcs and Gallop. It was first announced by Sanrio on their official Twitter page to coincide with the anime franchise's 5th anniversary. The series aired on April 5, 2014, on TV Tokyo and TV Osaka and is directed by Itsuro Kawasaki and written by Natsuko Takahashi. It is the first Jewelpet installment to be officially handled by Zexcs who co-produced the Jewelpet Twinkle Fan Discs and the OVA episode.

The story focuses on Momona, a girl from Jewel Land who accidentally gets transported into a mysterious place during her cousin's wedding reception. Standing in front of Jewel Land's prestigious Jewel Palace alongside the other girls, she meets Ruby, a white rabbit Jewelpet who chooses her to be her partner and become a Petit Lady. Knowing all the trials will be hard, she and Ruby must persevere in order for her to become a proper lady and gain the title of being a Lady Jewel. But standing in their way is Lillian and her Jewelpet partner, Luea, who also both want the same title and also, the hand of Prince Cayenne.

Jun Ichikawa was hired to compose the music, while J-Pop band Fairies performs the series' respective opening and ending theme songs, Your Love (as M-Three) and RUN with U.

An official DVD boxset of the series, containing all the episodes, was released by Frontier Works on July 7, 2015. The boxset also contains official character art, information on the characters and extra bonuses.

== Episode list ==
No.	Title	Original release date
1	"A Lady's Etiquette, Lady Go!"; Transliteration: "Redi no tashinami redi gō!" (Japanese: レディのたしなみレディ・ゴー！)	April 5, 2014
Momona is a girl in Jewel Land who is longing to see her older cousin getting married. However during the reception, she is transported to the prestigious Jewel Palace alongside other girls. She then meets Ruby for the first time, receiving a pen-like item. As Ruby tells her to become a Petit Lady so she can be crowned a Lady Jewel, Momona has some tough decisions if she can do it.
2	"A Lady-to-be should Eat Splendidly!"; Transliteration: "Reditaru mono suteki ni o shokuji!" (Japanese: レディたるものステキにお食事！)	April 12, 2014
Momona finally decides to stay in Jewel Land and become a Petit Lady with Ruby. However she faces a serious problem, involving the kiss between her and Cayenne and the other candidates are as more lady-like as her. To make things worse, her next test is to pass the "Nice Dining" exam with him in order to advance.
3	"A Lady shines on stage!" Transliteration: "Butai no ue de kagayake redi!" (Japanese: 舞台の上で輝けレディ！)	April 19, 2014
For the next test on becoming a Lady Jewel, the Petit Ladies must pass an exam by acting in a Romeo and Juliet stage play along with a prince. Momona is also up for the test but she doesn't have enough skills to act on stage or with someone playing as a Prince, posing a big problem for her.
4	"Being Princess Carried is also part of Being a Lady"; Transliteration: "Ohimesama dakko wa redinotashinami" (Japanese: お姫様だっこはレディのたしなみ)	April 26, 2014
On the next test, the petit ladies must have a prince sweep her off her feet. However Mizuki has problems regarding the test regarding to cute looks doesn't suit her, and the other girls must find a way to help her.
5	"Ladies-to-be, spend a Romantic Night..."; Transliteration: "Reditaru mono romantikkuna ichiya o" (Japanese: レディたるものロマンティックな一夜を)	May 3, 2014
Momona's next Lady Exam is to spend a romantic vacation under the starry night, but unaware that she is spending it with Lillian, Cayenne and Romeo in the southern seas. During that time, Momona tries to be more friendly to Lillian and know more about her while the pets were on a break.
6	"Ladies-to-be, obtain a Star!"; Transliteration: "Reditaru mono hoshi o te ni ireyo!" (Japanese: レディたるもの星を手に入れよ！)	May 10, 2014
During Momona's vacation with Cayenne, Lillian and Romeo, Lady Jewel appeared before them and gave them the next test which is obtaining a "star" in order to pass. However realizing that a Shooting Star fell on the island, the ladies and princes must race against each other in order to get the price and pass the test.
7	"A lovely letter is part of being a Lady"; Transliteration: "Sutekina mēru wa redi no tashinami" (Japanese: ステキなメールはレディのたしなみ)	May 17, 2014
The Petit Ladies' next test is to convey her feelings through a love e-mail using the Jewel Pod. With the ladies will have difficulty on this task, Momona will have a hard time for the test itself. Though Charon is good on reading and writing, she herself is a bit hesitant while reflecting her time when she first met Sapphie.
8	"Pierce through a Lady's heart" Transliteration: "Redi no hāto o inuke!" (Japanese: レディのハートを射抜け！)	May 24, 2014
For the next task, the ladies must design a lovely dress of their own while the princes however needs to pass a task involving "piercing a lady's heart". During Momona's test, Cayenne told her why he wanted to become King. As he walks off They encountered Lillian and Luea and Momona decides to tag along to pick some flowers, not knowing to their Jewelpet Partners that they're wandering into trouble.
9	"A Lovely Lady Announcer"; Transliteration: "Sutekina redi anaunsā" (Japanese: ステキなレディ・アナウンサー)	May 31, 2014
The ladies' next task given to them is to be good at conversation and become an announcer in order to pass the test. During the test, they all go to the city to interview various people in town. However, the task given is rather tough for the Petit Ladies.
10	"A parasol is part of being a Lady"; Transliteration: "Parasoru wa redi no tashinami" (Japanese: パラソルはレディのたしなみ)	June 7, 2014
The next test given to the ladies in training is how to use a Parasol in a graceful fashion, either in sun or rain. Mizuki herself has difficulty on the task itself as she is not quite used on using an umbrella of any kind. Worse, she abandons her test, which causes a serious problem between her and Soarer.
11	"The Lady Police is full of Heart-Throbbing Moments"; Transliteration: "Rediporisu wa dokidoki ga ippai" (Japanese: レディポリスはドキドキがいっぱい)	June 14, 2014
For the next task given to Momona, she must learn to experience many different jobs and workplaces for a day. Momona became a policewoman for a day in order to complete the task while Lillan became the curator of the Jewel Museum. However, trouble starts to brew as Sweetsland's most prized treasure, the Mascaron Tiara has been mysteriously stolen.
12	"Being loved by children is part of being a Lady"; Transliteration: "Akachan ni suka reru no wa redinotashinami" (Japanese: 赤ちゃんに好かれるのはレディのたしなみ)	June 21, 2014
The ladies' next task is for them to be kind to children and take care of them kindly. For Momona and Ruby's situation, they both met a baby Jewelpet named Labra, which will add to the difficulty on their task.
13	"Afternoon Tea is part of being a Lady"; Transliteration: "Afutanūntī wa redi no tashinami" (Japanese: アフタヌーンティーはレディのたしなみ)	June 28, 2014
Cayenne and Momona were both going on a date together to know more about each other but, knowing she can't leave the palace grounds, she must ask permission first. On the other hand, Lady Lecter summoned Cayenne, Romeo and Soarer and told them about the Royal Palace and either one of them can go there to study further to become King. For Momona, she's tasked with another test by Lady Jewel: making Afternoon Tea. But at the day of their date, something terrible has happened to Cayenne.
14	"A Lady must be Splendid in Selfies"; Transliteration: "Redi wa jidori mo karei ni" (Japanese: レディは自撮りも華麗に)	July 5, 2014
For the next test given to the Petit Ladies, they must capture splendid pictures of themselves using their Jewel Pods. Seeing it maybe an easy task, Momona starts to get worried regarding Cayenne, as he's transferring to the Royal Palace.
15	"Goodbye with a smile" Transliteration: "Egao de sayonara" (Japanese: 笑顔でさよなら)	July 12, 2014
Before Cayenne leave the Jewel Palace, Momona decides that the two must go on a date together. However this doesn't go well for Lillian herself and she decides to survey the two, along with the others following her.
16	"Reading is part of being a Lady"; Transliteration: "Dokusho wa redi no tashinami" (Japanese: 読書はレディのたしなみ)	July 19, 2014
The girls receive an exciting novel from an anonymous author, and immediately fall in love with it. Unbeknown to them, Charon is the author of the novel. Lady Lecter tells the petit ladies not to read it as it has content unfitting of a lady. Charon has conflicting thoughts, because she knows what she is doing is wrong, but she wants to keep writing the novel.
17	"Helping People is Part of Being a Lady"; Transliteration: "Hitobito o tasukeru koto wa joseidearu koto no ichibudearu" (Japanese: 人々を助けることは女性であることの一部である)	July 26, 2014
For the next test given to the Petit Ladies, help people in need. From helping out a couple to find a restaurant to arranging flowers, regardless of how small the act of kindness, helping someone in need leaves a lasting impression. When Momona runs into trouble with a shady model scout, Muira jumps in to save her. Later on, the girls find out that Muira held first place in the entrance exams yet was sent to containment on his first day of school.
18	"'Ladies First' is Part of Being a Prince"; Transliteration: "Redīsu daiichiōjidearu koto no ichibudearu" (Japanese: レディース第一王子であることの一部である)	August 2, 2014
Momona's friends were very worried about how Muira is causing a stir in the Jewel Palace especially to Momona herself. As they all decided to find out his true motives, the ladies and princes were given a new task regarding on letting the lady to go first as part of manners. However Momona and Muira needed to team up to pass, which makes her worry.
19	"A Haunted House is part of Being a Lady"; Transliteration: "Obakeyashi mo redinotashinami" (Japanese: お化け屋敷もレディのたしなみ)	August 9, 2014
For Momona's next test, she must learn to carry herself gracefully with courage with the setting being the haunted house inside the Jewel Palace, believed to haunted by ghosts. The worst thing of all during the test, Lillian found something that may relate to Luea's past.
20	"Creating an Album is part of Being a Lady"; Transliteration: "Arubamu-tsukuri wa redinotashinami" (Japanese: アルバム作りはレディのたしなみ)	August 16, 2014
The ladies-to-be next test to create an album scrapbook filled with photos of their first experience in the Jewel Palace. However Ruby noticed something about the photos, and found out that Momona doesn't have any photo of Cayenne.
21	"Ladies-to-be, become the Flowers of the Festival"; Transliteration: "Reditaru mono fesutibaru no hana ni" (Japanese: レディたるものフェスティバルの花に)	August 21, 2014
The Jewel Palace host their annual Jewel Festival; which occur once every summer. All the ladies had a chance to shine this year and to spend time to each other. But that's said, Momona and Lillian must use their time to spend a night with each other seeing that Cayenne is no longer here.
22	"A Lady should treat Every Moment with Someone Preciously"; Transliteration: "Redi wa ichigoichie de omotenashi" (Japanese: レディは一期一会でおもてなし)	August 30, 2014
Momona's next test will involve on how she clearly remember her once in a lifetime moment with someone she cherish closely. With all said, Ruby is in trouble due to her partner didn't have a Jewel Pad; an item serving as her true proof of candidacy. But to make things even worse, Luea knew everything about her secret about Momona chosen during the wedding, all due to a mysterious person who summoned her.
23	"Keeping a Secret is part of Being a Lady"; Transliteration: "Himitsu o mamoru no wa redinotashinami" (Japanese: ヒミツを守るのはレディのたしなみ)	September 6, 2014
As the day of the test draws near, Luea is saddened about how her previous partner left her years ago while Ruby still worries about her partnership with Momona; keeping her secret and lie about being her mentor. Miura and Luea then talked about eradicating Momona and Ruby out of the competition; him doubting on what she said while Lillian overheard their discussion.
24	"Rolling is part of Being a Lady"; Transliteration: "Korokoro wa redinotashinami" (Japanese: コロコロはレディのたしなみ)	September 13, 2014
For the next test, the ladies must learn to prepare things and to pack things necessary for travels. Thought before the exams, Momona and Charon then pay a visit to the Prince Palace to return Levin's Jewel Pad. In there, Momona encountered Miura and he told her to be herself regarding the secret of her enrollment to the Jewel Palace.
25	"A Smiling Lunch is part of Being a Lady"; Transliteration: "Sumairu ranchi wa redinotashinami" (Japanese: スマイルランチはレディのたしなみ)	September 20, 2014
The next exams given is to prepare a picnic lunch that can make someone smile. Despite Mizuki is worried on the task, the girls are doing their best gathering information on how will their picnic lunch will come out. But in a worst case scenario, Miura is sent in confinement after Lady Boot misblamed him on hacking to the Lady System's servers, not knowing that Luea is the true culprit.
26	"A Lady who can say "NO""; Transliteration: "NO to ieru redi" (Japanese: NOと言えるレディ)	September 27, 2014
Due to their high scores, Momona and Lillian were both qualified to be transferred to the Royal Palace. But Ruby is more of worried than happy for her due that she didn't chose her as a proper Petit Lady and has been lying to her ever since. In all her worries, Momona then finally learned the shocking truth.
27	"The Prince of Curry!"; Transliteration: "Karē no purinsu-sama~tsu!" (Japanese: カレーのプリンスさまっ！)	October 4, 2014
The Petit Ladies this time must participate for the challenge given to the Prince Candidates, which is home cooking. When the food they will cook ends up to be Curry, they all must see how do they perform in terms of cooking skills.
28	"The Ladies' Samba Carnival"; Transliteration: "Redi no sanbakānibaru" (Japanese: レディのサンバカーニバル)	October 11, 2014
The staff of the Jewel Palace will host a Thanks Jewel Palace event with the theme being a Samba Carnival. With the event being organized by Ruby, Luea plans to spoil the event for the Petit Ladies and on her sheer hate against her.
29	"Going on Walks is part of Being a Lady"; Transliteration: "Osanpo wa redinotashinami" (Japanese: お散歩はレディのたしなみ)	October 18, 2014
The next exams for the Petit Ladies is to experience how to take the dogs on a stroll in a presentable manner. It is also decided that the ladies must work with the Male Jewelpets in order to pass the test. But when the Jewelpet featured in the test is Nephrite, things doesn't seem to go as planned for Momona when she found out he is more of a trouble to work on.
30	"The Ladies' Halloween Party"; Transliteration: "Redi no harouinpātī" (Japanese: レディのハロウィンパーティー)	October 25, 2014
Halloween is just around the corner. With the next exam featuring Masquarade, the Jewel Palace is hosting their annual Halloween Party for the Petit Ladies and the Prince Candidates alike. However, when Luea's magic goes out of hand after bringing a knight armor to life, someone came back to save the petit ladies from harm.
31	"Prince's Mushroom Hotpot"; Transliteration: "Purinsu no kinoko nabe" (Japanese: プリンスのキノコ鍋)	November 1, 2014
The challenge this time is for the princes, which is survival in the mountains and gathering mushrooms in the Jewel Mountains to make Mushroom Hotpot. Since the Ladies needs to evaluate the Princes this time, Momona and Miura discover something surprising about the Music Box Lillian found and its connections to Lady Diana.
32	"Ladies-to-be, Turn Jewel Power into Your ally" Transliteration: "Reditaru mono juerupawā o mikata ni" (Japanese: レディたるものジュエルパワーを味方に)	November 8, 2014
Today's Lady challenge is to unlock and master Jewel Power and awaken its true potential. With Momona and the other Petit Ladies decided to use the Jewels based on their mentors, Luea took an opposite approach and told Lillian to use a Diamond for the task.
33	"An Adult's Date is Heart-Throbbing"; Transliteration: "Otona no dēto wa dokidoki" (Japanese: 大人のデートはドキドキ)	November 15, 2014
The next Lady Exam given to Momona is to learn to adapt in a date, and the setting being a restaurant. Miura on the other hand decides to crack into Luea's Jewelpad and discovered something interesting. As With Ruby decided on a Sushi Bar, The Petit Ladies and their Jewelpet Mentors must learn how to eat one in a proper manner. Miura then met up with Momona to show her and Ruby something, a private video regarding Momona's cousin: Prince Alto and Lady Diana's first date. But Luea interfered in anger due to him hacking inside her Jewelpad, as she grabbed his. However when she accidentally dropped it on the ground, Miura and Momona were sucked inside. Only then the two learned more about how both Prince Alto and Lady Diana met about their first date.
34	"A Lady that can make a Fashionable Dress Look Good"; Transliteration: "Hayari no doresu o kikonasu redi" (Japanese: 流行りのドレスを着こなすレディ)	November 22, 2014
The next exam for the ladies is to learn more about making fashionable clothes and must make a dress for the doll they received. Lillian however felt a bit glum for the test, seeing there are some things that she didn't know especially her true self.
35	"Christmas Preparations is part of Being a Lady"; Transliteration: "Kurisumasu no junbi wa redinotashinami" (Japanese: クリスマスの準備はレディのたしなみ)	November 29, 2014
As Christmas is coming soon, Both Lady Lecter and Lady Boot are investigating the mysterious attacks that happened in the Jewel Palace and how it can be linked to another crisis in Jewel Land. On the other hand, both Lecter and Boot finally recognized Momona and Lillian to go to the Royal Palace, but they must clear one final task first before they can finally move. however Luea is not happy on the news.
36	"To the Royal Palace!"; Transliteration: "Roiyaruparesu e!" (Japanese: ロイヤルパレスへ！)	December 6, 2014
As Momona and Lillian's preparation's are finished and the final task is near, both girls are ready for move to the Royal Palace before Christmas. But when Momona and Lillian finally passed and can now go to the Royal Palace, Romeo is depressed on how Momona turned him down. Luea took this opportunity and cast her magic towards him, which ends up being possessed by Joker.
37	"Ladies's Treasure Hunt"; Transliteration: "Redi no takarasagashi" (Japanese: レディの宝探し)	December 13, 2014
Momona has finally graduated from the Jewel Palace and now continuing her Lady Study in the Royal Palace. Her first exam however involves something about "treasure for couples", but she is worried about how she will fare against high-leveled petit ladies this time. In the midst of the exam, Lady Elena decides to tell Momona the truth, on what happened between Lady Diana and Luea years ago.
38	"Ladies' Christmas"; Transliteration: "Redi-tachi no kurisumasu" (Japanese: レディたちのクリスマス)	December 20, 2014
It is the day before Christmas with Elena offering a Christmas Party to everyone in the Royal Palace. But with all the disturbing atmosphere, Momona is unsure if she can talk to Cayenne again knowing her doubts on Elena due to jealousy.
39	""Happy New Year" is Part of being a Lady"; Transliteration: "Happīnyūiyā wa redinotashinami" (Japanese: ハッピーニューイヤーはレディのたしなみ)	December 27, 2014
Another year has passed in Jewel Land and a new year is drawing near. But back at the Jewel Palace, Garnet gets news that Momona is coming to the Jewel Palace. After sharing the news with everyone, Garnet drags Momona's friends into believing that Momona was kicked out of the Royal Palace. Her friends from the Jewel Palace are gonna try to cheer her up during her return in the New Year, but they found out that Momona went back only to repair her Jewel Pad. As the party starts, all of them starts to remember their past experiences and memories in the Jewel Palace.
40	"Drawing Fortunes for the New Year is a Part of being a Lady"; Transliteration: "Shin'nen o uranau no mo redinotashinami" (Japanese: 新年を占うのもレディのたしなみ)	January 4, 2015
Ruby and Luea are celebrating the first day of the new year in the Royal Palace as Momona goes back to the Royal Palace. Momona decided to have a date to Cayenne and have their New Year Fortunes read, as well as both Lillian and Miura. But when Lillian and Miura go to the fortune teller he tells Miura that Lillian doesn't have a past and a future she only has the present, which confuses him regarding her origins.
41	"A Lady-to-be must Treasure her Bonds with Others"; Transliteration: "Reditaru mono kizuna o taisetsu ni…" (Japanese: レディたるもの絆を大切に…)	January 10, 2015
One night, Ruby dreams she is told by a strange lady that Momona is the only one who can save Jewel Land and believe in the power of love without giving up. Ruby herself doesn't know what it means, but the next day, Momona and the others discuss who exactly Joker is and how he is related to the mysterious attacks and to Lady X. Also, Miura finally discovers the shocking truth about Cayenne and Lillian.
42	"A Lady's Past..."; Transliteration: "Redi no kako" (Japanese: レディの過去)	January 17, 2015
Momona's next lady challenge is to understand Ruby more deeply and to find her true powers. However, the test will determine both Ruby and Momona's bond towards each other and find Ruby's power spot. But Miura is now fully aware of Luea's actions to Lillian, however she decides to stop him before he has a chance to talk to her.
43	"Disappearing Lady"; Transliteration: "Kieru Redi" (Japanese: 消えるレディ)	January 24, 2015
After Miura is knocked out by Luea, she discovers a strange staff coming out from her JewelPad. It is confirmed to be the Final Wand as Joker finally scolds her for deliberately disobeying him and failing her duties. Because of this, she kidnaps Miura, only for him to discover Lillian's true origins, regretfully saying that he loved her despite it all. Momona, Ruby, Lillian and Cayenne also found out everything, but Joker makes his move and decides to eradicate everyone using the Final Wand. Lillian then makes a regretful sacrifice.
44	"A Lady must shoot the Jewel Arrow"; Transliteration: "Redi wa jueruarō o iru" (Japanese: レディはジュエルアローを射る)	January 31, 2015
With Miura mourning Lillian's death and Luea taking off with the Final Wand, Lady Jewel decided to sacrifice herself to seal the gate. However it failed as she died using up her magic. Momona and the others learn about Luea's relation to Joker and the Door of Chaos has been opened after Luea and Ruby failed to bring Lillian back to life and summoned a Beast instead. To save everyone, Elena and Romeo must face the Beast alone and use the Jewel Arrow to stop it. But when the beast is defeated, Momona is shocked to see Diana sacrificing herself to the Door of Chaos.
45	"Luea's in Danger!"; Transliteration: "Rūa ga abunai!" (Japanese: ルーアがあぶない！)	February 7, 2015
The summoned beast has been defeated, but Diana has used up her magic to seal the gate. Meanwhile, Luea is still on the run. Seeing that she still holds the Final Wand, Momona and the others continue their search for her. Miura soon discovers something surprising and familiar inside his JewelPad.
46	"Who is Joker?"; Transliteration: "Jōkā wa dareda?" (Japanese: ジョーカーは誰だ？)	February 14, 2015
Reunited at last with her human partner Diana, Luea finds out that Lillian is still alive. Momona and Ruby, meanwhile, have to figure out... Who really is Joker? ...and why is he hiding in the shadows?
47	"Lady Joker"; Transliteration: "Redi Jōkā" (Japanese: レディジョーカー)	February 21, 2015
Joker's true identity has been revealed as Lady Lecter, surprising Momona and the others; especially the fact she knew about all of their secrets and the Door of Chaos. But they were more surprised when she told them the shocking truth on her descent to darkness.
48	"Possessed Lady"; Transliteration: "Ubawareta Redi" (Japanese: 奪われたレディ)	February 28, 2015
Following the death of Lady Lecter and her fading into the light. Elena is ambushed by one of the Beasts and fights back, but is suddenly possessed by a strange shadow who wants to steal the Final Wand from Ruby.
49	"Jewel Arrow of Fate"; Transliteration: "Unmei no jueruarō" (Japanese: 運命のジュエルアロー)	March 7, 2015
With Rosa gone and Jewel Land facing another crisis, the Royal Palace has been surrounded by an ominous mist. Momona stands up along with Ruby in order to bring Lillian and everyone's smile back on their final battle against the Beasts.
50	"Saving the World is Part of Being a Lady!"; Transliteration: "Sekai o sukuu no wa redinotashinami!" (Japanese: 世界を救うのはレディのたしなみ！)	March 14, 2015
Despite now being able to use the Jewel Arrow, Momona cannot shoot it and ends up reopening the Door of Chaos, making her hesitant on facing the Beasts. When she lowers down her weapon, Momona wants to know about their true feelings.
51	"A White Rabbit and a Red Ribbon"; Transliteration: "Shiroi usagi to akai ribon" (Japanese: 白いうさぎと赤いリボン)	March 21, 2015
Momona wakes up in her bed with no recollection on what happened, or her experiences of her being a Lady Candidate. Now as an ordinary girl, she treats the entire thing as if it was all a dream and goes on with her everyday life. But suddenly in a string of events, she sees a familiar white rabbit that leads to her to meeting Cayenne once more.
52	"Be the Top Lady"; Transliteration: "Toppuoburedi e" (Japanese: トップオブレディへ)	March 28, 2015
Momona and Cayenne have been together for a while; talking, smiling and sharing their feeling towards each other. But now is the time for the prince to finally gather his courage and propose to Momona for their marriage. Meanwhile at Jewel Land, Claire gives Lillian and Elena one final task to determine who will become the next Lady Jewel.
