= Jewelpet: Magical Change =

Japanese anime television series

- 1st DVD boxset cover

ジュエルペット マジカルチェンジ (Juerupetto: Majikaru Chenji)
- Genre: Magical girl
- Anime television series
- Directed by: Nobuhiro Kondo
- Written by: Masahiro Yokotani
- Music by: Hajime Hyakkoku
- Studio: Studio Deen; TMS Entertainment
- Original network: TXN (TV Tokyo, TV Osaka)
- English network: HK: TVB
- Original run: 4 April 2015 – 26 December 2015
- Episodes: 39

Jewelpet: Magical Change (Japanese: ジュエルペット マジカルチェンジ, Hepburn: Juerupetto Majikaru Chenji) is a 2015 Japanese anime produced by Studio Deen and TMS Entertainment. It is the seventh and final installment in the Jewelpet anime franchise based on the characters jointly created by Sanrio and Sega Sammy Holdings. The series is directed by Nobuhiro Kondo (Nobunagun) and written by Masahiro Yokotani (Free!, Beelzebub). Character designs are done by Hiroki Harada (Romeo × Juliet) and Tomoko Miyakawa. It aired in all TXN stations in Japan on April 4, 2015, to December 26, 2015, replacing Lady Jewelpet in its initial time slot.

Jewelpet: Magical Change reintroduced the magical girl genre after five years, since Jewelpet Twinkle in 2010. The anthropomorphisation of the Jewelpet serve as a plot device for this series. A rerun show titled Jewelpet Magical Change: Dream Selection (Japanese: ジュエルペット マジカルチェンジ ドリームセレクション, Hepburn: Juerupetto Majikaru Chenji Dorīmu Serekushon) aired on the same time slot on TV Tokyo on January 9, 2016.

== Story ==
Seven years ago, a strange castle fell from the sky into a normal suburban town without warning. Confusion has arisen about where this castle came from, and the town's citizens have come in to investigate, only to fail due to being locked. Now known as the Jewel Castle, no one has been paying attention to it ever since its sudden arrival on Earth. In fact, people have never known the castle is of other worldly origin, as Jewel Land's magic fades, the castle appears in the human world due to mankind's fading belief in magic. Wanting to improve its magic once more, Jewelpets are sent all across the Human World in order to study their way of life and in hopes that their helping hand could rekindle their "magic-believing hearts".

One of the Jewelpets sent to Earth is Ruby, a cheerful Japanese hare who befriends Airi Kirara. Years later, Airi, now at the age of 14, is still remembering that meeting and now wearing a pendant that her father gave her. She met other Jewelpets: Luna, Larima and Labra, who came to her world from Jewel Land searching for Ruby. As they found her and got into trouble, Ruby discover a new ability; merging with Airi's pendant to change into a human being to cast magic. The Jewelpets must try to get adjusted to the new world while they try to discover the mysteries behind Airi's pendant and its relation to the incident seven years ago.

== Characters ==
=== Main characters ===
- Airi Kirara (雲母 あいり, Kirara Airi): The series' main protagonist, Airi is a 14-year-old middle schoolgirl living in a town where the Jewel Castle has fallen to. Voiced by Ari Ozawa.
- Sakutarō Kirara (雲母 朔太郎, Kirara Sakutarō) is Airi's 17-year-old brother who attends second year of high school. Analytical and ambitious, he usually invents things for the household and believes that nothing cannot be solved by science. Sakutarō also refuses to accept any Jewelpet's help due to their magic and more on focusing on inventing things, but soon accepted them as part of the family. Voiced by Koutaro Nishiyama.
- Laura Fukuouji (福王寺 ローラ, Fukuouji Rōra): Airi's childhood friend from France, she is the heiress of the Fukuouji Zaibatsu. Laura returned to Japan to see her again and usually has a strange relationship with Luea, both of whom aim to get Airi's Magical Stone and make sure Laura got close to Sakutaro. Voiced by Rui Tanabe.
- Mittermeyer Katō (ミッターマイヤー加藤, Mittāmaiyā Katō) is Laura's servant. Voiced by Eriko Matsui.
- Nene (ねね): One of Airi's close human friends, she is a girl who has freckles on her face and wears glasses. Voiced by Amina Sato.
- Oyakata (親方) is the owner of the restaurant "Denden Sushi", where Peridot works during her stay in the human world. Voiced by Amina Sato.
- Watermelon Kanjin (スイカ怪人, Suika kaijin) is a group of Watermelon-themed soldiers that Sapphie created in a deserted island by modifying plants. They are usually weak and reverts to watermelons when got beaten.

== Development ==
Jewelpet: Magical Change was first revealed during the 2015 Winter Wonder Festival in Japan and was confirmed in the March Issue of the Shogakukan magazine Pucchigumi. The April Issue also confirmed the show's new concept, revolving around the Jewelpets transforming into Human (Moe anthropomorphism) through magical means, thought It is still unconfirmed about how the transformation will be done. The series will also use original concepts from the franchise's earlier years.

On March 16, Dorothy Little Happy confirmed that they performed the ending theme song to coincide with their fifth anniversary tour in Japan. A 30-second promotional video has been streamed through the YouTube account of fellow Sega Sammy subsidiary TMS Entertainment with permission from Sanrio and Studio Deen. A special live event was held on April 3, 2015, on Sanrio Puroland to coincide the new series' launch. The main voice actors and Dorothy Little Happy appeared in the event as fans viewed the first episode. Ayaka Saito, the voice actor of Ruby stated in her blog that the series will run for 39 episodes.

== Media ==
=== Anime ===
Jewelpet: Magical Change aired between April 4, 2015, and December 26, 2015, in all TXN stations, including TV Tokyo and TV Osaka, replacing Lady Jewelpet in its initial time-slot. Victor Entertainment released the series in 3 DVD-Box sets in Japan, with the first box set released on October 23, 2015.

=== Music ===
The opening song is "Magical Change" (マジカルチェンジ, Majikaru Chenji) by Magical Dreamin'. The first ending song is titled Tell me tell me!! by Dorothy Little Happy, the second is titled Baby, Love me! by GEM and the third titled Magical☆Kiss (マジカル☆キス, Majikaru☆Kisu) by X21.

== Controversy ==
A minor controversy sparked in the series's voice casting, which enraged the fans. During the press conference of the anime, Misono stated that she got Luna's role through a fair audition and was happy to be part of the cast, despite her announcing her retirement in the media business. However long-time cast member Ayaka Saito said on her blog that she is saddened about the absence of Garnet and Sapphie and their voice actors Aya Hirano and Nozomi Sasaki, saying it was a "sad farewell due to behind the scenes circumstances". Luna's original voice actor, Rumi Shishido was shocked also and said in her tweet that she was not informed there was even an audition to replace her, or even the fact that she had been replaced. She told people to stop talking about the incident and to clear her name.

On April 14, 2015, Misono updated her blog and made a public apology to Rumi, saying that "I said [I got the role] due to 'talent' and 'my own strength', but I was wrong... It's 'thanks to the staff...' I'm so sorry." She also said that she was so happy about her debut that she could only think about herself, and that she never wanted to make it into a situation in which she "stole" someone else's role or work. She also said that she received a lot of death threats from fans, However, she noted that she wants to hear the opinions, advice, and feelings about her acting during the show from parents, and assured viewers that she would not ignore their voices.
