= X21 (group) =

Japanese girl idol group

- Origin: Japan
- Genres: J-pop
- Years active: 2013–2018
- Labels: Avex Trax (since 19 March 2014), Oscar Promotion (2nd X21)
- Website: x21.oscarpro.co.jp

X21 (次世代ユニットX21, Jisedai Yunitto Ekkusu Nijūichi) was a Japanese girl idol group. It was formed in 2013 of 21 finalists (with the average age of 14 years) of the 13th Japan Bishōjo Contest and is affiliated to the entertainment company Oscar Promotion.

== Members ==
=== Former members ===
- Mai Suenaga (末永 真唯)
- Koharu Yamaki (山木 コハル)
- Mami Nagao (長尾 真実)
- Shuri Tanaka (田中 珠里)
- Hasumi Shiritori (白鳥 羽純)
- Rina Matsuda (松田 莉奈)
- Honoka Kaminaguchi (上水口 萌乃香)
- Nanaka Ozawa (小澤 奈々花)
- Sakura Komoriya (籠谷 さくら)
- Sāya Yamasaki (山﨑 紗彩)
- Ichika Osaki (尾碕 真花)
- Manami Igashira (井頭 愛海)
- Yūka Takamura (髙村 優香)
- Hikaru Katogaki (門垣 ひかる)
- Mika Iijima (飯島 未賀)
- Yurina Kawaguchi (川口 ゆりな)
- Megumi Nakazato (中里 萌)
- Shiori Inuzuka (犬塚 しおり)
- Moe Fujie (藤江萌)
- Misaki Nishikawa (西川 美咲)
- Ayano Wakayama (若山 あやの)
- Miyu Sagawa (佐川 実優)
- Runa Takahashi (高橋 るな)
- Yurika Hosoi (細井 友里加)
- Misaki Sera (瀬羅 美咲)
- Aguri Ōnishi (大西 亜玖璃)
- Miho Izumikawa (泉川 実穂)
- Miyu Yoshimoto (吉本 実憂)

== Discography ==
=== Studio albums ===
No.	Title	Album details	Peaks	
No.	Title	Album details	JPN	JPN Hot. (Note: The Billboard Japan Hot Albums chart was established in June 2015.)
1	Shōjo X (少女X)	Released: April 29, 2015; Label: Avex Trax; Format(s): CD, CD+DVD, digital download	21	—
2	Beautiful X	Released: March 15, 2017; Label: Avex Trax; Format(s): CD+VR, CD+Blu-ray, digital download	20	40
"—" denotes items which failed to chart.

=== Singles ===
No.	Title	Release date	Peaks		Album
No.	Title	Release date	JPN	JPN Hot. (Note: Sources for chart positions are as follows: "Asu e no Sotsugyō", "Yakusoku no Oka", "Natsu dayo!!", "Kagami no Naka no Parallel Girl", "Genjitsu kara Nigeru kara Genjitsu ga Tsurainda", "Friday Night Party)	Album
1	"Asu e no Sotsugyō" (明日への卒業)	March 19, 2014	15	100	Shōjo X
2	"Koisuru Natsu!" (恋する夏!)	June 25, 2014	9	—	Shōjo X
3	"Happy Appli" (ハッピーアプリ)	September 24, 2014	11	—	Shōjo X
4	"X Gift" (Xギフト)	December 3, 2014	21	—	Shōjo X
5	"You-ki no Parade" (YOU-kIのパレード)	September 23, 2015	5	—	Beautiful X
6	"Magical☆Kiss" (マジカル☆キス)	December 2, 2015	10	—	Beautiful X
7	"Yakusoku no Oka" (約束の丘)	March 30, 2016	10	54	Beautiful X
8	"Natsu dayo!!" (夏だよ!!)	July 27, 2016	15	30	Beautiful X
9	"Kagami no Naka no Parallel Girl" (鏡の中のパラレルガール)	December 21, 2016	12	42	Beautiful X
10	"Genjitsu kara Nigeru kara Genjitsu ga Tsurainda" (現実から逃げるから現実がツラいんだ)	August 16, 2017	6	30	Non-album single
11	Friday Night Party	March 14, 2018	9	29	Non-album single
12	Destiny	September 19, 2018	8	—	Non-album single
"—" denotes items which failed to chart.

== Music videos ==
Year	Title
2014	"Asu e no Sotsugyō"] (YouTube Special MV)
2014	"Gwiyomi Song" (キヨミ・ソング)
2014	"Koisuru Natsu!"
2014	"Happy Appli"
2014	"Xギフト"
2015	"Shōjo X"
2015	"YOU-kI no Parade"
2015	"Magical☆Kiss"
2016	"Yakusoku no Oka"
2016	"Natsu dayo!!"
2016	"Kagami no Naka no Parallel Girl"
2017	"Beautiful X"
2017	"Genjitsu kara Nigeru kara Genjitsu ga Tsurainda
