= GEM (band) =

Japanese pop band

- Origin: Japan
- Genres: J-pop
- Years active: 2013–2018
- Labels: Idol Street
- Members: Yuki Kanazawa; Chisami Ito; Yu Morioka; Nana Minamiguchi; Jurin Kumashiro; Kako Oguri; Maaya Takeda; Sara Hirano; Hirari Nishida
- Past members: Nagi Ozeki; Hazuki Sakamoto; Nana Asakawa; Risa Uchimura; Monami Noguchi; Lana Murakami; Maho Iyama
- Website: girls-entertainment-mixture.jp

GEM (acronym for "Girls Entertainment Mixture") was a Japanese idol girl group formed in 2013, and part of the Idol Street project maintained by Avex Trax. GEM disbanded on March 25, 2018 and the remaining members will be transferred to other iDOL Street group.

== Members ==
- Yuki Kanazawa
- Chisami Ito
- Yu Morioka
- Nana Minamiguchi
- Jurin Kumashiro
- Kako Oguri
- Maaya Takeda
- Sara Hirano
- Hirari Nishida

=== Former members ===
- Nagi Ozeki
- Hazuki Sakamoto
- Nana Asakawa
- Risa Uchimura
- Monami Noguchi
- Lana Murakami
- Maho Iyama

=== Timeline ===
Black - hiatus

== Discography ==
=== Singles ===
Title	Release date	Featured Songs	Chart position		Sales (Oricon)		Certification	Notes
Title	Release date	Featured Songs	Oricon Weekly Singles Chart	Billboard Japan Hot 100	First week	Total	Certification	Notes
We're GEM!	1 January 2014	"We're GEM!"; "BFF"; "PAN-PAKA-PAN!"	12					
Do You Believe?	4 June 2014	"Do You Believe?"; "Like a Heartbeat"; "Just! Call Me"	9					
Star Shine Story	17 December 2014	"Star Shine Story"; "Can't Stop Loving"	5					Last single to be featured before Chisami Ito went on hiatus.
Baby, Love Me!	30 September 2015	"Baby, Love me!"; "The Brand-New Girl"	18					Only single to be released while Chisami Ito was on hiatus.; "Baby, Love me!" was used as the second ending of Jewelpet Magical Change and the official theme song of Avex's Kira Challenge 2015.
Fine! ~fly for the future~	23 March 2016	"Fine! ~fly for the future~"	3					Last single to feature Maaya Takeda before going on hiatus.; First single with Chisami Ito back from hiatus.
Spotlight	20 July 2016	"Spotlight"; "fRiEnDs"; "one"	17					First single to feature Monami Noguchi and Hirari Nishida.; Last single to feature Monami Noguchi.; First single without Maaya Takeda.; "fRiEnDs" only featured Yu Morioka, Lana Murakami, Maho Iyama, and Hirari Nishida.; "one" features Monami Noguchi with Jurin Kumashiro for the chorus. Dance performance features Nana Minamiguchi, Kako Oguri, Lana Murakami, Maho Iyama, and Sara Hirano.
Sugar Baby	15 February 2017	Sugar Baby; WHAT IF?; Little Bud of Dreams (夢の蕾, Yume no Tsubomi)	9					Maho Iyama is featured as the center in "Sugar Baby"; First single not to feature Monami Noguchi.
Luna and Sol from GEM	19 October 2017	Don't You Wanna Kiss?; GALAXY; MJK	10					"Don't You Wanna Kiss?" is performed by Chisami Ito, Yuki Kanazawa, Nana Minamiguchi, Yu Morioka and Hirari Nishida as LUNA from GEM.; "GALAXY" and "MJK" is performed by Sara Hirano, Maho Iyama, Jurin Kumashiro, Lana Murakami and Kako Oguri as SOL from GEM; Final Single

=== Music Cards ===
Title	Release date	Featured Songs	Chart position		Sales (Oricon)		Certification	Notes
Title	Release date	Featured Songs	Oricon Weekly Singles Chart	Billboard Japan Hot 100	First week	Total	Certification	Notes
No Girls No Fun	28 June 2015	No Girls No Fun	-	-	-	-	-	Only featured Yuki Kanazawa, Yu Morioka, Kako Oguri, Lana Murakami, Maaya Takeda, Maho Iyama, and Sara Hirano.
You You You	28 June 2015	You You You	-	-	-	-	-	Only featured Chisami Ito, Yu Morioka, Jurin Kumashiro, Lana Murakami, and Maho Iyama.
Delightful Days	28 June 2015	Delightful Days	-	-	-	-	-	Only featured Yuki Kanazawa, Nana Minamiguchi, Kako Oguri, Lana Murakami, Maaya Takeda, Maho Iyama, and Sara Hirano.
You and I. /Strongest Summer!! (キミと僕。/最強 Summer!!, Kimi to Boku. /Saikyou Summer!!)	16 August 2017	"You and I." (キミと僕。, Kimi to Boku.); Strongest Summer! (最強 Summer!!, Saikyou Summer!!)	-	-	-	-	-	

=== Albums ===
Title	Release date	Featured Songs	Chart position		Sales (Oricon)		Certification	Notes
Title	Release date	Featured Songs	Oricon Weekly Singles Chart	Billboard Japan Hot 100	First week	Total	Certification	Notes
Girls Entertainment Mixture	23 March 2016	CD 1; 1. Girls Entertainment Overture; 2. We’re GEM!; 3. Do You Believe?; 4. Star Shine Story; 5. No Girls No Fun; 6. You You You; 7. Delightful Days; 8. Baby, Love me!; 9. Fine! ～fly for the future～; Type B CD2; 1. PAN-PAKA-PAN!; 2. Just! Call Me; 3. The Brand-New Girl; 4. BFF; 5. Like A Heartbeat; 6. Can’t Stop Loving; Type B CD2; 1. Tears in the sky 2. FLY NOW!!; 3. Party Up; 4. Clarity; 5. departure; Type C CD2; 1. Kitto For You! (きっと For You！); 2. Onegai Moonlight (オネガイMoonlight); 3. Speed up 4. Do it Do it 5. EMERGE!!; 6. DANCIN' DANCIN' DANCE!!	-	-	-	-	-	"Clarity" featured Chisami Ito, Jurin Kumashiro, Lana Murakami, Maaya Takeda, and Maho Iyama.; "EMERGE!!" featured Maaya Takeda only.; "DANCIN' DANCIN' DANCE" featured Chisami Ito, Kako Oguri, Lana Murakami, and Sara Hirano.

=== Collaborations ===
Single	Artist	Release date	Songs participated in	Notes
TOMOSUKE×Jazzin' park presents LANA	TOMOSUKE, Jazzin' park, and Lana Murakami	–	–	Performed with Lana Murakami
TRF Respect Idol Tribute!! (TRFリスペクトアイドルトリビュート!!, TRF Risupekuto Aidoru Toribyūto!!)	IRF, Idoling!!!, Dream5, Tokyo Girls' Style, BiS, iDOL Street, and DJ KOO from TRF	19 December 2012	Love & Peace Forever	"Love & Peace Forever" featured Chisami Ito, Maho Iyama, Jurin Kumashiro, Nana Minamiguchi, Lana Murakami, and Maaya Takeda with SUPER☆GiRLS, Cheeky Parade, and Street-sei.
Celebration	SUPER☆GiRLS	20 February 2013	Celebration	With All iDOL Street Members
Everlasting Summer High Touch (常夏ハイタッチ, Tokonatsu Hai Tatchi)	SUPER☆GiRLS	12 June 2013	PAN-PAKA-PAN!	With All iDOL Street Members
Magical☆Change (マジカル☆チェンジ, Majikaru☆Chenji)	Magical☆Dreamin' (マジカル☆どりーみん, Majikaru☆Dorīmin)	5 August 2015	Magical☆Change (マジカル☆チェンジ, Majikaru☆Chenji)	Used as the opening theme for Jewelpet: Magical Change.; Featured Nana Minamiguchi and Lana Murakami as members of Magical☆Dreamin'.
Hello・Christmas (ハロ・クリダンス, Haro・Kurisumasu)	Yovex (妖ベックス, Youbekkusu)	27 September 2017	Hello・Christmas (ハロ・クリダンス, Haro・Kurisumasu)	Used as the ending theme for Yokai Watch.; Featured Chisami Ito, Yu Morioka, and Lana Murakami as members of Yovex.
