= Dorothy Little Happy =

Japanese band

Dorothy Little Happy ドロシーリトルハッピー
- Origin: Sendai, Miyagi, Japan
- Genre: Pop
- Years active: 2010–present
- Labels: Avex Trax, Space Shower Music
- Members: Mari Takahashi
- Past members: Michiyo Suzuki; Ruuna Akimoto; Mimori Tominaga; Koumi Hayasaka; Kana Shirato
- Website: dorothylittlehappy.com

Dorothy Little Happy (ドロシーリトルハッピー) is a solo unit originated in Sendai, Miyagi Prefecture, Tohoku, Japan. The unit belongs to the model talent agency Stepone, headquartered in Sendai as well, under the label Otodama Records.

After Kana Shirato graduated, the group became the solo project of Mari Takahashi. Mari graduated in December 2018 and the group has since been restarted with new members in 2019.

== Members ==
=== Current members ===
- Fūka Kurimura (栗村風香)
- Akina Katō (加藤亜希菜)
- Kiri Kurokawa (黒川季里)
- Nana Takeuchi (竹内菜々)

=== Past members ===
- Michiyo Suzuki (鈴木 美知代)
- Ruuna Akimoto (秋元 瑠海) (left in July 2015)
- Mimori Tominaga (富永 美杜) (left in July 2015)
- Kōmi Hayasaka (早坂 香美) (left in July 2015)
- Kana Shirato (白戸 佳奈) (graduated June 2017)
- Mari Takahashi (高橋 麻里) (graduated December 2018)

== Discography ==
=== Albums ===
#	Title	Release date	Oricon peak position
1	Demo Sayonara (デモサヨナラ)	March 16, 2011	-
2	Demo Sayonara 2012 (デモサヨナラ2012)	January 11, 2012	153
3	Life goes on	February 20, 2013	30
4	Starting Over	March 10, 2014	9
5	Circle of the world	January 1, 2015	18
6	The Best of Dorothy Little Happy (2010-2015)	April 13, 2015	30

=== Singles ===
#	Title	Release date	Oricon peak position
1	"Jump!" (ジャンプ！)	August 4, 2010	-
2	"Fuyu no Sakura ~winter flower~" (冬の桜～winter flower～)	December 1, 2010	-
3	HAPPY DAYS!	January 11, 2012	48
4	"Tobidase! summertime" (飛び出せ!サマータイム)	July 11, 2012	26
5	"Kaze yo Hayaku" (風よはやく)	December 5, 2012	17
6	Colorful life	June 12, 2013	8
7	ASIAN Stone	October 16, 2013	7
8	Sky traveler	July 16, 2014	10
9	Tell me tell me!!	May 20, 2015	64
10	Restart	December 16, 2015	13
11	Bicolor no Koigokoro (バイカラーの恋心)	May 25, 2016	16
12	For You / Demo Sayonara (2017 ver.)	June 12, 2017	16

=== DVDs ===
- Journey to Oz Vol.01 [released April 30, 2011]

== See also ==
- Avex Trax
